= 1948 Arab–Israeli War =

Second and final stage of the 1948 Palestine war

- Part of the 1948 Palestine war and the Arab–Israeli conflict
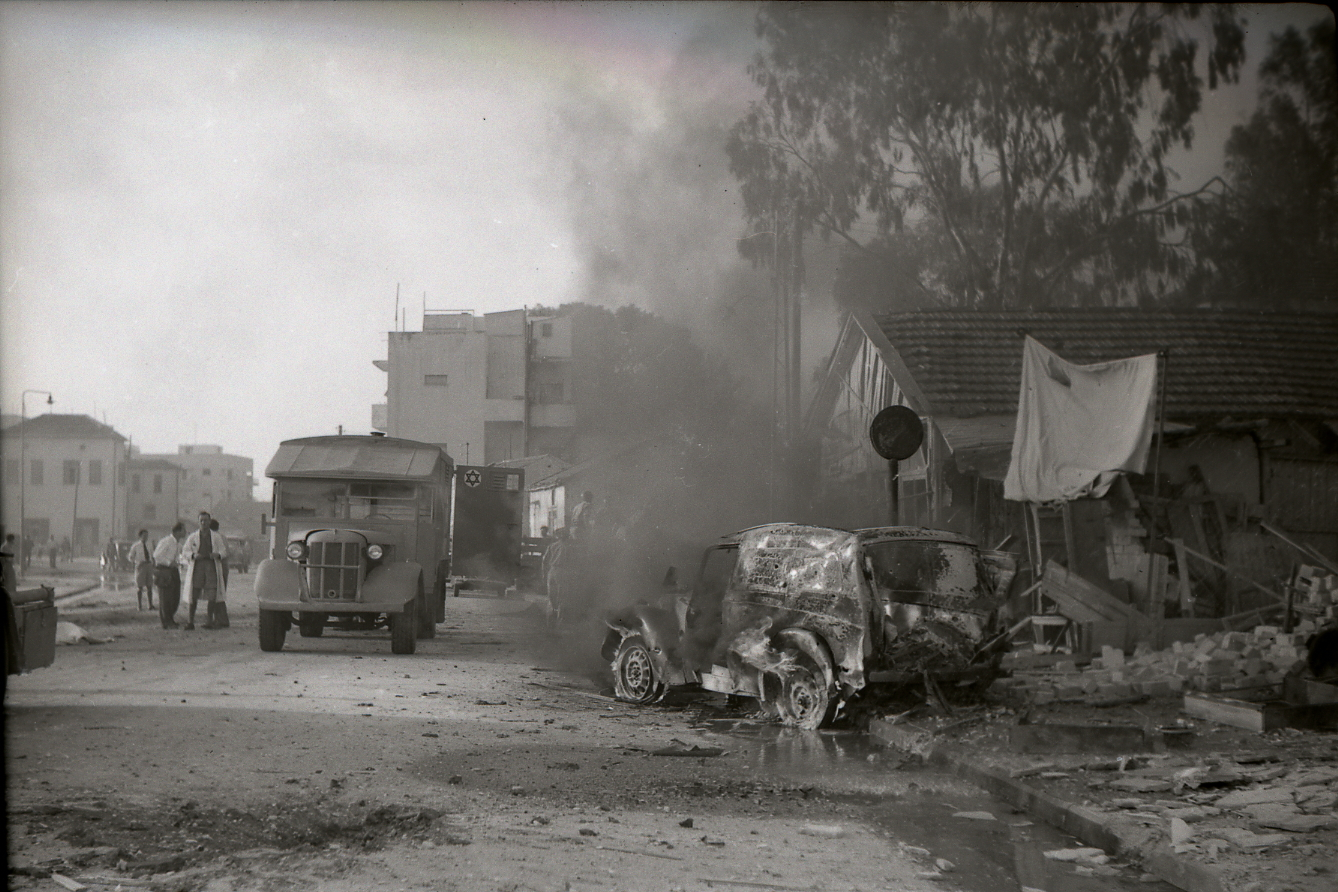
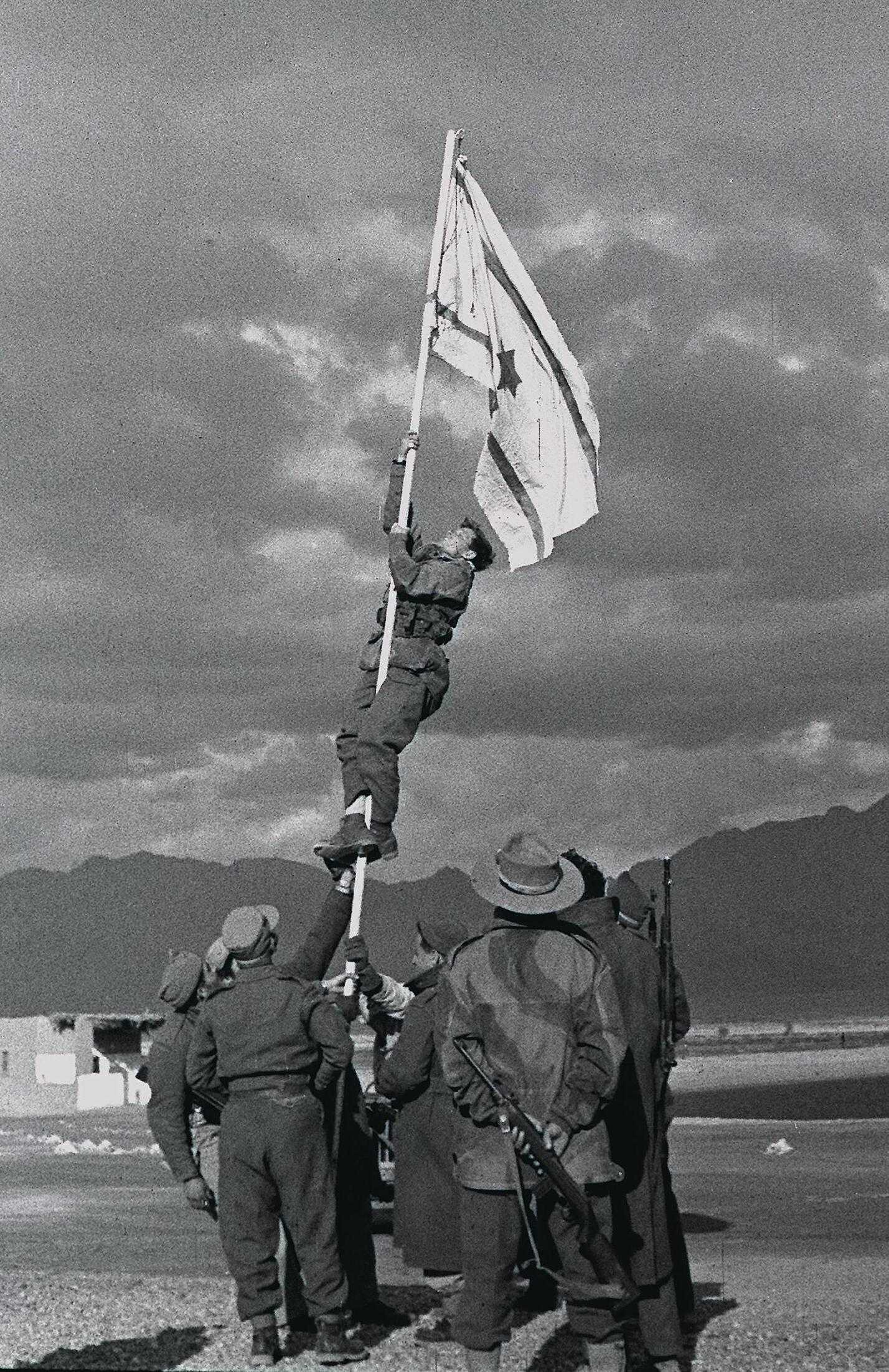
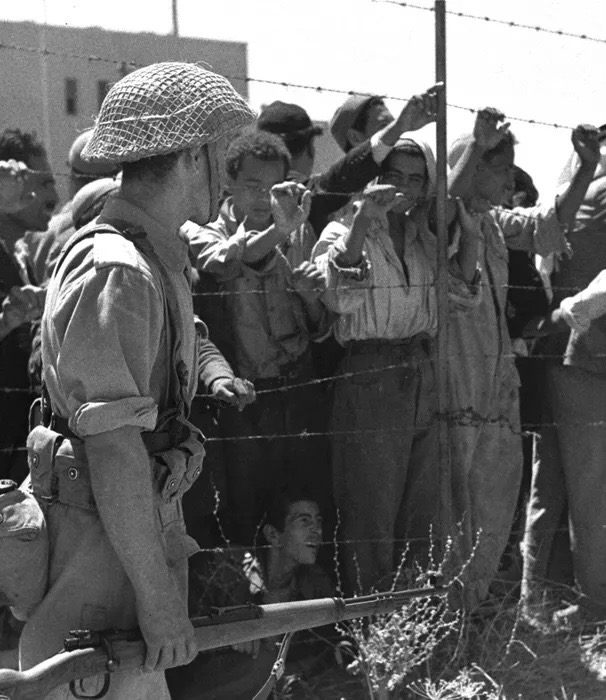
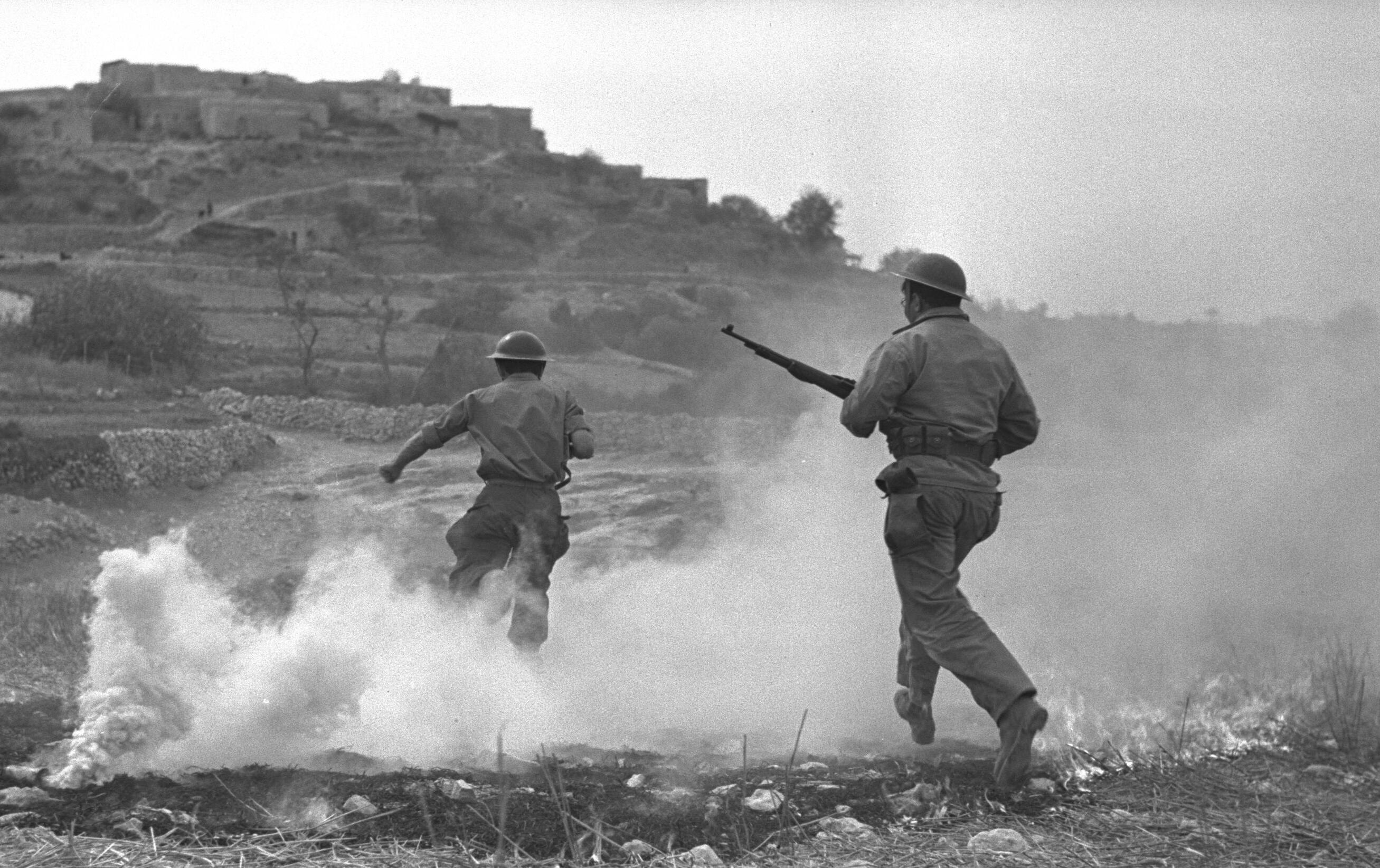
- From top to bottom, left to right: Damaged and ruined buildings and vehicles following the Egyptian airstrike on the Tel Aviv central bus station; Jewish soldiers raising the Israeli flag at the end of the war; Israeli soldier with Palestinian prisoners during the expulsion from Ramla; Israeli forces attacking the village of Sa'sa'
Date	15 May 1948 – 10 March 1949 (Note: Final armistice agreement concluded on 20 July 1949.) (9 months, 3 weeks and 2 days)
Location	Former British Mandate of Palestine, Sinai Peninsula, southern Lebanon
Result	Israeli victory; Transjordanian partial victory; Palestinian defeat; Hundreds of thousands of Arabs flee or are expelled to the Gaza Strip, the West Bank and surrounding Arab states, forming the start of the Palestinian refugee crisis; Beginning of the Palestinian Fedayeen insurgency; Arab League defeat; Hundreds of thousands of Jews flee or are expelled from Arab countries, largely settling in Israel; Arab League boycott of Israel
Territorial changes	Establishment of the State of Israel; Jordanian annexation of the West Bank; Egyptian occupation of the Gaza Strip

Belligerents
Israel; Before 26 May 1948: Haganah; Palmach; Hish; HIM; Irgun; Lehi; Druze militants; Allied Bedouin tribes After 26 May 1948: Israel Defense Forces; IDF Minorities Unit; Foreign volunteers: Mahal	Arab League; Egypt; All-Palestine Protectorate (Note: After 22 September 1948); Holy War Army; Transjordan; Iraq; Syria; Lebanon (Note: Lebanon had decided to not participate in the war and only took part in the battle of al-Malikiya on 5–6 June 1948.); Saudi Arabia; Yemen; Irregulars: Arab Liberation Army; Al-Najjada; Druze militants; Holy War Army; Muslim Brotherhood

Commanders and leaders
(Israel) David Ben-Gurion (Israel) Yisrael Galili (Israel) Yaakov Dori (Israel) Yigael Yadin (Israel) Mickey Marcus † (Israel) Yigal Allon (Israel) Yitzhak Rabin (Israel) David Shaltiel (Israel) Moshe Dayan (Israel) Shimon Avidan (Israel) Moshe Carmel (Israel) Yitzhak Sadeh (Israel) Aharon Remez	(Arab League) Azzam Pasha (Kingdom of Egypt) Farouk (Kingdom of Egypt) Ahmed Ali al-Mwawi (Kingdom of Egypt) Mohamed Naguib (Jordan) Abdallah I (Jordan) John Bagot Glubb (Jordan) Habis Majali (Kingdom of Iraq) Muzahim al-Pachachi (First Syrian Republic) Shukri al-Quwatli; Amin al-Husseini; Hasan Salama †; Fawzi al-Qawuqji; Hassan al-Banna

Strength
(Israel) 29,677 initially; later 117,500 (Note: This includes the entire military personnel count – both combat units and logistical units.)	(Kingdom of Egypt) 10,000 initially; later 20,000 (Jordan) 7,500–10,000 (Kingdom of Iraq) 2,000 initially; later 15,000–18,000 (First Syrian Republic) 2,500–5,000 (Lebanon) 1,000 (Saudi Arabia) 800–1,200 (Egyptian command) (Kingdom of Yemen) 300; 3,500–6,000; Total: 13,000 (initial); 51,100–63,500 (Note: These numbers include only the combat units sent to the former mandate-territory of Palestine, not the entire military strength.)

Casualties and losses
(Israel) 6,373 killed (about 4,000 fighters and 2,400 civilians)	Arab armies: (Arab League) 3,700–7,000 killed Palestinian Arabs: 3,000–13,000 killed (both fighters and civilians)
- 750,000+ Arabs flee or are expelled from Palestine forming the Palestinian diaspora Hundreds of thousands of Jews flee or are expelled from Arab countries, with over 260,000 in Israel by 1951.

The 1948 Arab–Israeli War (15 May 1948 – 10 March 1949), also known as the First Arab–Israeli War, (Note: Sometimes called the Israeli War of Independence) followed the civil war in Mandatory Palestine (29 November 1947 – 14 May 1948) as the second and final stage of the 1948 Palestine war. The civil war became a war of separate states with the Israeli Declaration of Independence on 14 May 1948, the end of the British Mandate for Palestine at midnight, and the entry of a military coalition of Arab states into the territory of Mandatory Palestine the following morning. The war formally ended with the 1949 Armistice Agreements which established the Green Line.

Since the 1917 Balfour Declaration and the 1920 creation of the British Mandate of Palestine, and in the context of Zionism and the mass migration of European Jews to Palestine, there had been tension and conflict between Arabs, Jews, and the British in Palestine. On 29 November 1947, the United Nations General Assembly voted in favor of the United Nations Partition Plan for Palestine, proposing to divide the territory into an Arab state, a Jewish state, and an internationally administered corpus separatum for the cities of Jerusalem and Bethlehem. The land allocated to the Arab State included about 43% of Mandatory Palestine. The land allocated to the Jewish State, who constituted a third of the population, was 56% of Mandatory Palestine. While Jewish leaders in Palestine supported the plan, leaders of the Palestinian Arab community and in the broader Arab world did not. The following day, the conflict escalated into a civil war with attacks by Palestinian militias and mobs on Jewish areas. As the two communities battled, the British withdrew.

In April 1948, Zionist forces launched an offensive codenamed Plan Dalet, during which they conquered and depopulated cities, villages, and territories in Mandatory Palestine in preparation for the establishment of a Jewish state. Just before the expiration of the British Mandate for Palestine, Zionist leaders announced the Israeli Declaration of Independence on 14 May 1948. The following morning, Egypt, Transjordan, Syria, and expeditionary forces from Iraq launched an invasion into Palestine, taking control of the Arab areas and attacking Israeli forces and settlements. The 10 months of fighting took place mostly on the territory of the British Mandate and in the Sinai Peninsula and southern Lebanon, interrupted by several truce periods.

By the end of the war, the State of Israel controlled about 78% of the former territory of Mandatory Palestine: all of the area that the UN had proposed for a Jewish state, as well as almost 60% of the area proposed for an Arab state, including Jaffa, Lydda and Ramla (Ramle) area, Upper Galilee, some parts of the Negev, the west coast as far as Gaza City, and a wide strip along the Tel Aviv–Jerusalem road. Israel also took control of West Jerusalem, which was meant to be part of an international zone for Jerusalem and its environs. Transjordan took control of East Jerusalem and what became known as the West Bank, annexing it the following year. The territory known today as the Gaza Strip was occupied by Egypt.

Expulsions of Palestinians, which had begun during the civil war, continued during the Arab-Israeli war. Hundreds of Palestinians were killed in multiple massacres, such as occurred in the expulsions from Lydda and Ramla. These events are known today as the Nakba (Arabic for "the catastrophe") and were the beginning of the Palestinian refugee problem. A similar number of Jews migrated, fled, or were expelled from Arab states in the three years following the war, 260,000 of whom went to Israel.

== Background ==
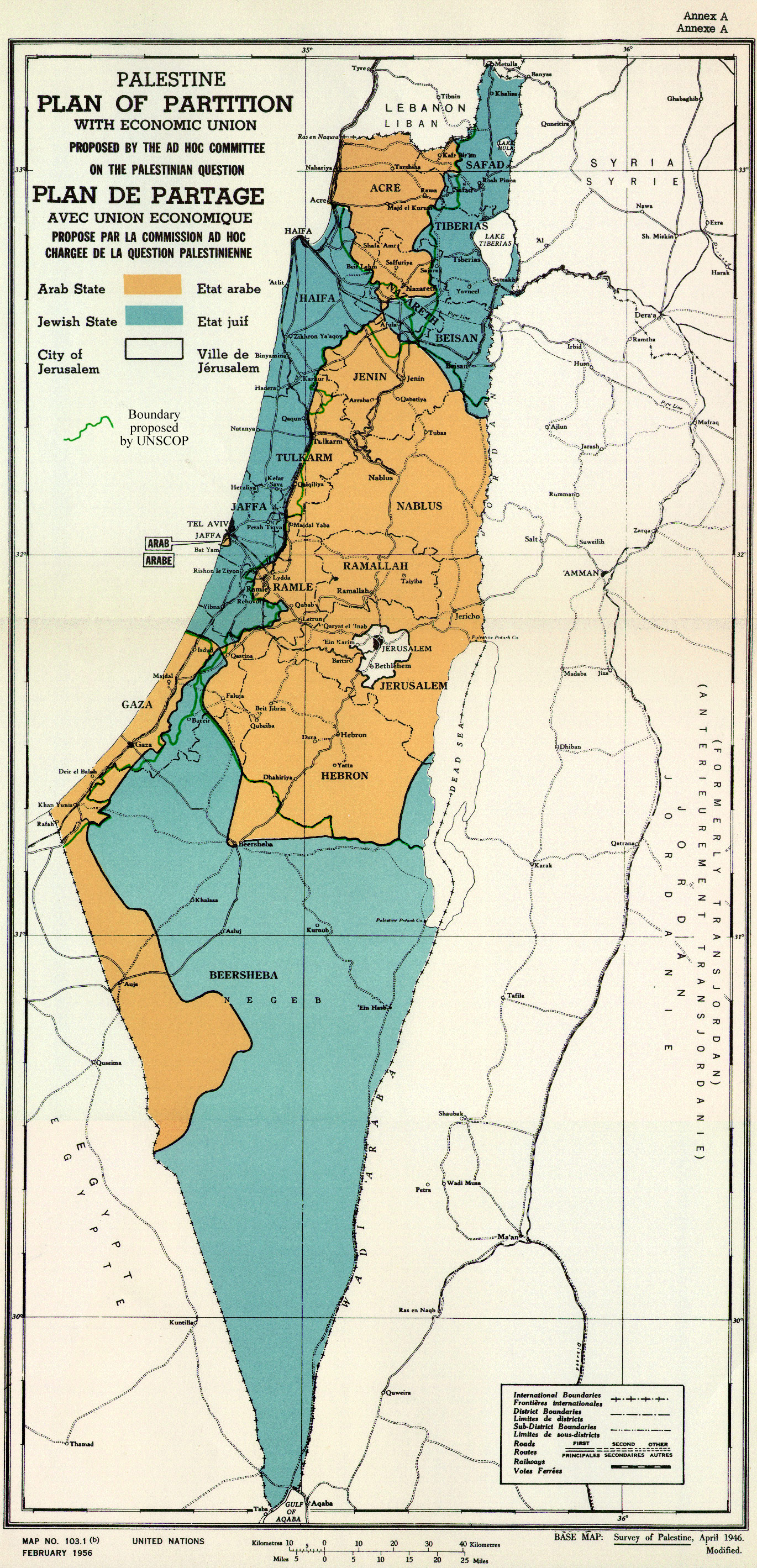
The 1947 UN Partition Plan for Palestine

Since the 1917 Balfour Declaration and the 1920 creation of the British Mandate of Palestine, and in the context of Zionism and the mass migration of European Jews to Palestine, there had been tension and conflict between Arabs, Jews, and the British. British policies dissatisfied both Arabs and Jews. In 1920, the Arab leaders were very disappointed with Britain. In 1916, the British commander-in-chief in Cairo had made an agreement with the Emir of Mecca: if the Arabs rebelled against the Ottoman Empire, the British would provide them with arms and money and support the formation of an independent Arab state. Around 30,000 older rifles and a smaller amount of modern weapons were supplied by the British, and a very large area from the Red Sea to Damascus was conquered.

Britain backtracked from its promise that an independent Arab state would be formed. In 1920, Britain let French troops attack the Arab Kingdom of Syria, crushing its army and overthrowing its government. Arab opposition developed into the 1936–1939 Arab revolt in Palestine, while the Jewish opposition developed into the 1944–1947 Jewish insurgency in Palestine. On 29 November 1947, the United Nations General Assembly adopted a resolution recommending the adoption and implementation of a plan to partition the British Mandate of Palestine into two states, one Arab and one Jewish, and the City of Jerusalem.

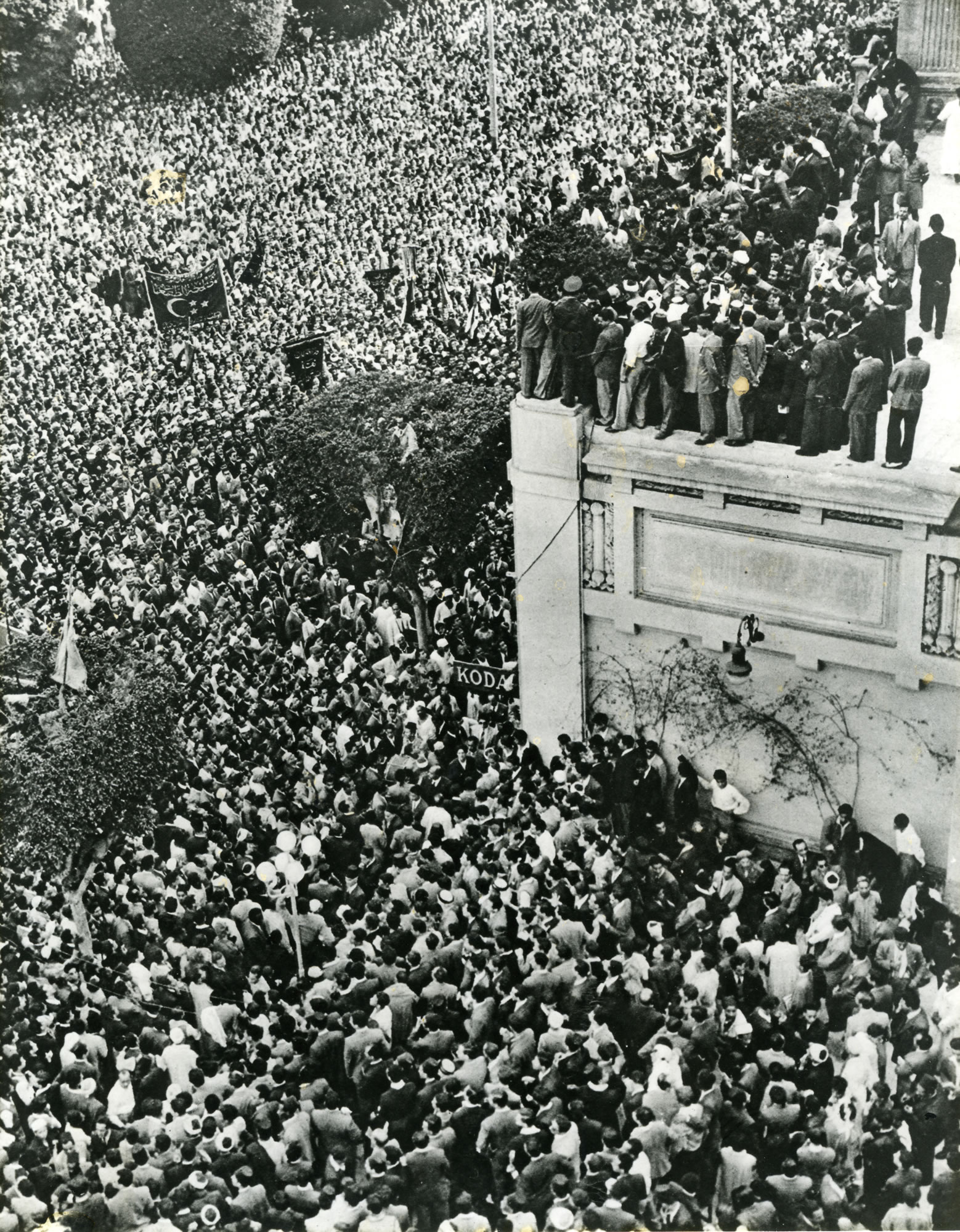
Protests in Cairo, Egypt against the UN Partition Plan, December 1947

The General Assembly resolution on Partition was greeted with overwhelming joy in Jewish communities and widespread outrage in the Arab world. In Palestine, violence erupted almost immediately, feeding into a spiral of reprisals and counter-reprisals. The British refrained from intervening as tensions boiled over into a low-level conflict that quickly escalated into a full-scale civil war.

From January onwards, operations became increasingly militarised, with the intervention of a number of Arab Liberation Army regiments inside Palestine, each active in a variety of distinct sectors around the different coastal towns. They consolidated their presence in Galilee and Samaria. Abd al-Qadir al-Husayni came from Egypt with several hundred men of the Army of the Holy War. Having recruited a few thousand volunteers, al-Husayni organised the blockade of the 100,000 Jewish residents of Jerusalem.

To counter this, the Yishuv authorities tried to supply the city with convoys of up to 100 armoured vehicles, but the operation became more and more impractical as the number of casualties in the relief convoys surged. By March, Al-Hussayni's tactic had paid off. Almost all of Haganah's armoured vehicles had been destroyed, the blockade was in full operation, and hundreds of Haganah members who had tried to bring supplies into the city were killed. The situation for those who dwelt in the Jewish settlements in the highly isolated Negev and north of Galilee was even more critical.

While the Jewish population had received strict orders requiring them to hold their ground everywhere at all costs, the Arab population was more affected by the general conditions of insecurity to which the country was exposed. Up to 100,000 Arabs, from the urban upper and middle classes in Haifa, Jaffa and Jerusalem, or Jewish-dominated areas, evacuated abroad or to Arab centres eastwards.

This situation caused the United States to withdraw its support for the Partition Plan, encouraging the Arab League to believe that the Palestinian Arabs, reinforced by the Arab Liberation Army, could put an end to the plan. However, the British decided on 7 February 1948 to support the annexation of the Arab part of Palestine by Transjordan.

Although doubt took hold among Yishuv supporters, their apparent defeats were due more to their wait-and-see policy than to weakness. David Ben-Gurion reorganised Haganah and made conscription obligatory. Every Jewish man and woman in the country had to receive military training. Thanks to funds raised by Golda Meir from sympathisers in the United States, and Stalin's decision to support the Zionist cause, the Jewish representatives of Palestine were able to sign very important armament contracts in the East. Other Haganah agents recovered stockpiles from the Second World War, which helped improve the army's equipment and logistics. Operation Balak allowed arms and other equipment to be transported for the first time by the end of March.

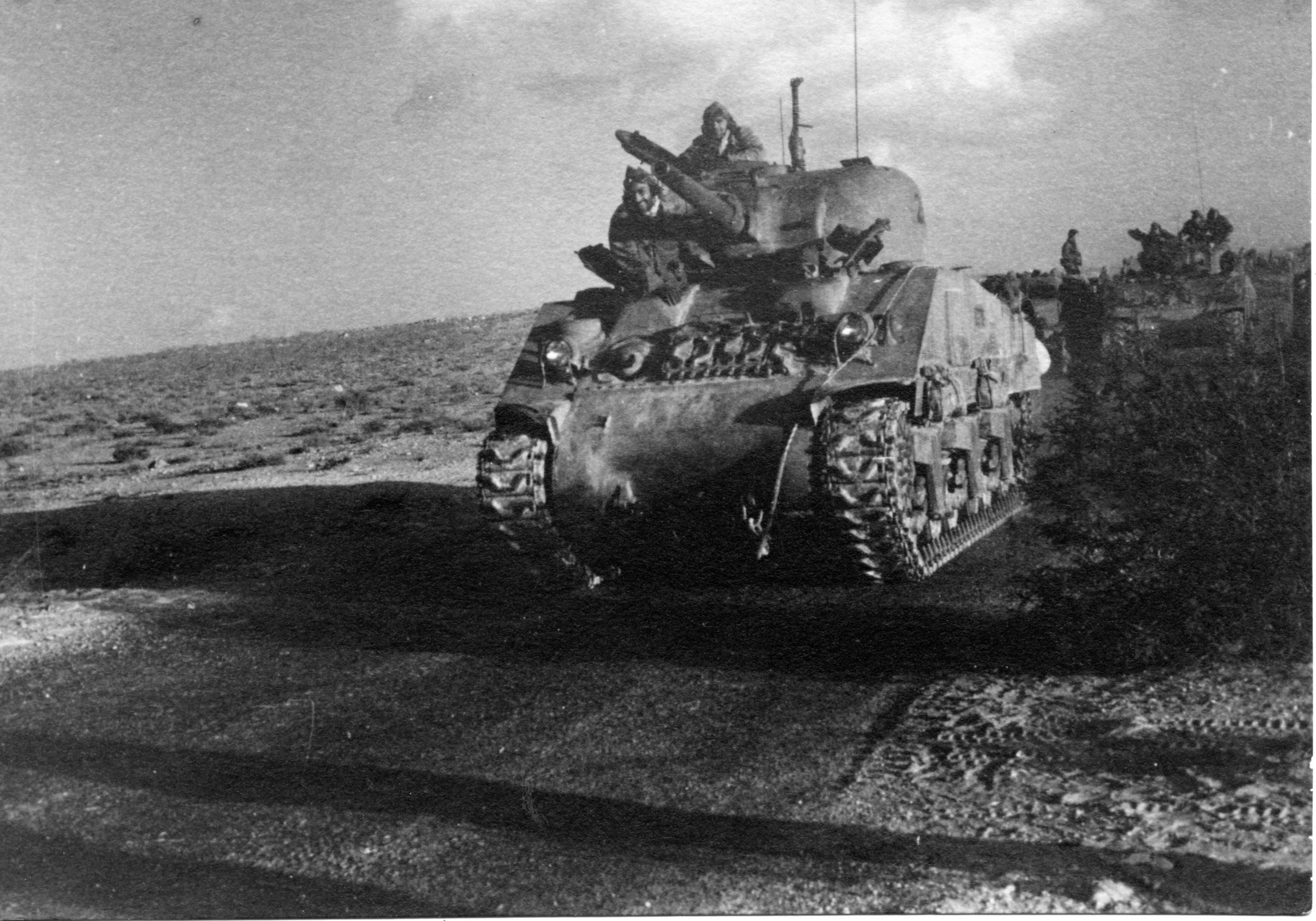
A Palmach M4 Sherman tank leading a convoy

Ben-Gurion invested Yigael Yadin with the responsibility to come up with a plan of offence whose timing was related to the foreseeable evacuation of British forces. This strategy, called Plan Dalet, was readied by March and implemented towards the end of April. A separate plan, Operation Nachshon, was devised to lift the siege of Jerusalem. 1500 men from Haganah's Givati brigade and Palmach's Harel brigade conducted sorties to free up the route to the city between 5 and 20 April. Both sides acted offensively in defiance of the Partition Plan, which foresaw Jerusalem as a corpus separatum, under neither Jewish nor Arab jurisdiction. The Arabs did not accept the Plan, while the Jews were determined to oppose the internationalisation of the city, and secure it as part of the Jewish state. The operation was successful, and enough foodstuffs to last two months were trucked into Jerusalem for distribution to the Jewish population. The success of the operation was assisted by the death of al-Husayni in combat.

During this time, fighters from Irgun and Lehi massacred a substantial number of Palestinians at Deir Yassin. The attack was widely publicized and had a deep impact on the morale of the Palestinian population and contributed to generate the exodus of the Arab population.

At the same time, the Arab Liberation Army was roundly defeated at Mishmar HaEmek in its first large-scale operation, coinciding with the loss of their Druze allies through defection.

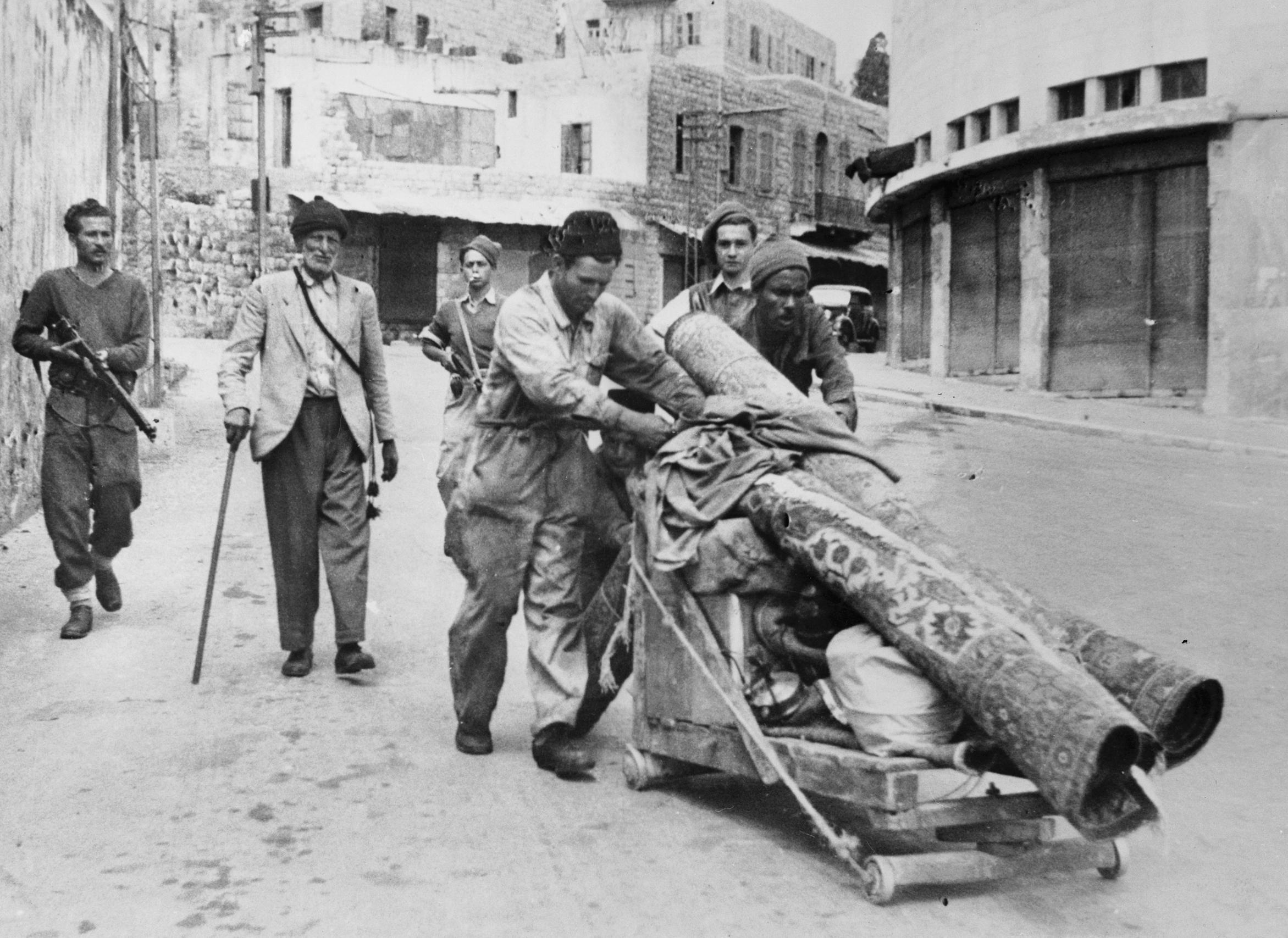
Palestinians being expelled from Haifa, April 1948

With the implementation of Plan Dalet, the Haganah, Palmach and Irgun forces began conquering mixed zones. The Palestinian Arab society was shaken as Tiberias, Haifa, Safed, Beisan, Jaffa and Acre were all captured and more than 250,000 Palestinian Arabs fled or were expelled.

The British had essentially withdrawn their troops. This pushed the leaders of the neighbouring Arab states to intervene, but they were not fully prepared, and could not assemble sufficient forces to turn the tide. The majority of Palestinian Arab hopes lay with the Arab Legion of Transjordan's monarch, King Abdullah I, but he had no intention of creating a Palestinian Arab-run state, since he hoped to annex as much of the territory of the British Mandate for Palestine as he could. He was playing a double game, being just as much in contact with the Jewish authorities as with the Arab League.

In preparation for the offensive, Haganah successfully launched Operations Yiftah and Ben-'Ami to secure the Jewish settlements of Galilee, and Operation Kilshon, which created a united front around Jerusalem. The inconclusive meeting between Golda Meir and Abdullah I, followed by the Kfar Etzion massacre on 13 May by the Arab Legion led to predictions that the battle for Jerusalem would be merciless.

On 14 May 1948, David Ben-Gurion declared the establishment of the State of Israel and the 1948 Palestine war entered its second phase with the intervention of the Arab state armies and the beginning of the 1948 Arab–Israeli War.

=== Armed forces ===
By September 1947, the Haganah had "10,489 rifles, 702 light machine-guns, 2,666 submachine guns, 186 medium machine-guns, 672 two-inch mortars and 92 three-inch (76 mm) mortars".

==== Importing arms ====
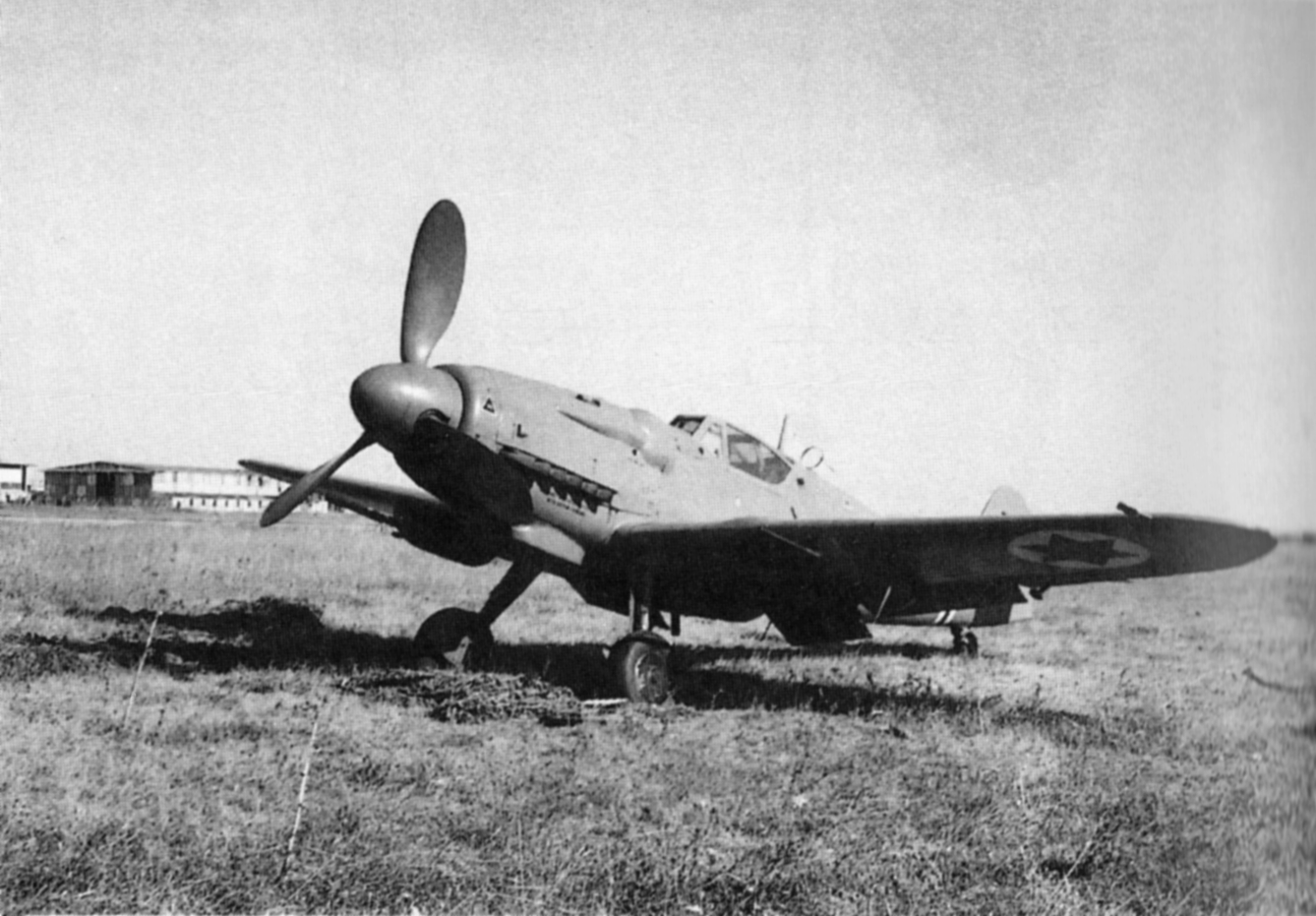
An Israeli Avia S-199, June 1948

In 1946, Ben-Gurion decided that the Yishuv would probably have to defend itself against both the Palestinian Arabs and neighbouring Arab states and accordingly began a "massive, covert arms acquisition campaign in the West", and acquired many more during the first few months of hostilities.

The Yishuv managed clandestinely to amass arms and military equipment abroad for transfer to Palestine once the British blockade was lifted. In the United States, Yishuv agents purchased three Boeing B-17 Flying Fortress bombers, one of which bombed Cairo in July 1948, some Curtiss C-46 Commando transport planes, and dozens of half-tracks, which were repainted and defined as "agricultural equipment". In Western Europe, Haganah agents amassed fifty 65mm French mountain guns, twelve 120mm mortars, ten H-35 light tanks, and a large number of half-tracks. By mid-May or thereabouts the Yishuv had purchased from Czechoslovakia 25 Avia S-199 fighters (an inferior version of the Messerschmitt Bf 109), 200 heavy machine guns, 5,021 light machine guns, 24,500 rifles, and 52 million rounds of ammunition, enough to equip all units, but short of heavy arms. The airborne arms smuggling missions from Czechoslovakia were codenamed Operation Balak.

The airborne smuggling missions were carried out by mostly American aviators – Jews and non-Jews – led by ex-U.S. Air Transport Command flight engineer Al Schwimmer. Schwimmer's operation also included recruiting and training fighter pilots such as Lou Lenart, commander of the first Israeli air assault against the Arabs. Several Americans, including Schwimmer, were later prosecuted by the U.S. government for violating the Neutrality Act of 1939.

==== Arms production ====
The Yishuv also had "a relatively advanced arms producing capacity", that between October 1947 and July 1948 "produced 3 million 9 mm bullets, 150,000 Mills grenades, 16,000 submachine guns (Sten Guns) and 210 three-inch (76 mm) mortars", along with a few "Davidka" mortars, which had been indigenously designed and produced. They were inaccurate but had a loud explosion that demoralised the enemy. Much of the munitions used by the Israelis came from the Ayalon Institute, a clandestine bullet factory beneath kibbutz Ayalon, which produced about 2.5 million bullets for Sten guns. The munitions produced by the Ayalon Institute were said to have been the only supply that was not in shortage during the war. Locally produced explosives were also plentiful. After Israel's independence, these clandestine arms manufacturing operations were moved above ground. All of the Haganah's weapons-manufacturing was centralised and later became Israel Military Industries.

==== Manpower ====
In November 1947, the Haganah was an underground paramilitary force that had existed as a highly organised, national force, since the Arab riots of 1920–21, and throughout the riots of 1929, Great Uprising of 1936–39, and World War II. It had a mobile force, the HISH, which had 2,000 full-time fighters (men and women) and 10,000 reservists (all aged between 18 and 25) and an elite unit, the Palmach composed of 2,100 fighters and 1,000 reservists. These mobile forces could rely on a garrison force, the HIM (Heil Mishmar, lit. Guard Corps), composed of people aged over 25. The Yishuv's total strength was around 35,000 with 15,000 to 18,000 fighters and a garrison force of roughly 20,000.

There were also several thousand men and women who had served in the British Army in World War II who did not serve in any of the underground militias but would provide valuable military experience during the war. Walid Khalidi says the Yishuv had the additional forces of the Jewish Settlement Police, numbering some 12,000, the Gadna Youth Battalions, and the armed settlers. Few of the units had been trained by December 1947. On 5 December 1947, conscription was instituted for all men and women aged between 17 and 25 and by the end of March, 21,000 had been conscripted. On 30 March, the call-up was extended to men and single women aged between 26 and 35. Five days later, a General Mobilization order was issued for all men under 40.

By March 1948, the Yishuv had a numerical superiority, with 35,780 mobilised and deployed fighters for the Haganah, 3,000 men under Lehi and Irgun, and a few thousand armed settlers. Irgun was eventually absorbed into the Jewish Defence Army. The activities of Irgun was monitored by MI5, which found that Irgun was "involved or implicated in numerous acts of terrorism" during the end years of the British mandate in Palestine such as the attacks on trains and the kidnapping of British servicemen.

==== Arab forces ====
According to Benny Morris, by the end of 1947, the Palestinians already "had a healthy and demoralising respect for the Yishuv's military power" and if it came to battle, the Palestinians expected to lose. When the first violent incidents broke out in Jerusalem on the 29 November, the Arab Higher Committee, well aware of their lack of armaments, had called for a three-day strike: the most militant Palestinian group in the city, consisting of 44 fighters, was furnished with 12 rifles, some handguns and a few kilograms of explosives.

The effective number of Arab combatants was listed as growing to 12,000 by some historians while others calculate an eventual total Arab strength of approximately 23,500 troops, and with this being more of less or roughly equal to that of the Yishuv. However, as Israel mobilised most of its most able citizens during the war while the Arab troops were only a small percentage of its far greater population, the strength of the Yishuv grew steadily and dramatically during the war.

== Political objectives ==
=== Yishuv ===
The Yishuv's aims evolved during the war. Mobilisation for a total war was organised. Initially, the aim was "simple and modest": to survive the assaults of the Palestinian Arabs and the Arab states. "The Zionist leaders deeply, genuinely, feared a Middle Eastern reenactment of the Holocaust, which had just ended; the Arabs' public rhetoric reinforced these fears". As the war progressed, the aim of expanding the Jewish state beyond the UN partition borders appeared: first to incorporate clusters of isolated Jewish settlements and later to add more territories to the state and give it defensible borders. A third and further aim that emerged among the political and military leaders after four or five months was to "reduce the size of Israel's prospective large and hostile Arab minority, seen as a potential powerful fifth column, by belligerency and expulsion".

According to research by Shay Hazkani, Ben-Gurion and segments of the religious Zionist leadership drew parallels between the war and the biblical wars of extermination, and states this was not a fringe position. IDF indoctrination pamphlets were distributed to recruits instructing them that God "demands a revenge of extermination without mercy to whoever tries to hurt us for no reason.".

Plan Dalet, or Plan D, (Hebrew: תוכנית ד', Tokhnit dalet) was a plan worked out by the Haganah, a Jewish paramilitary group and the forerunner of the Israel Defense Forces, in autumn 1947 to spring 1948, which was sent to Haganah units in early March 1948. The intent of Plan Dalet is subject to much controversy, with historians on the one extreme asserting that it was entirely defensive, and historians on the other extreme asserting that the plan aimed at maximum conquest and expulsion of the Palestinians. According to Walid Khalidi and Ilan Pappé, its purpose was to conquer as much of Palestine and to expel as many Palestinians as possible, though according to Benny Morris there was no such intent. In his book The Ethnic Cleansing of Palestine, Pappé asserts that Plan Dalet was a "blueprint for ethnic cleansing" with the aim of reducing both rural and urban areas of Palestine.

According to Yoav Gelber, the plan specified that in case of resistance, the population of conquered villages was to be expelled outside the borders of the Jewish state. If no resistance was met, the residents could stay put, under military rule. According to Morris, Plan D called for occupying the areas within the UN sponsored Jewish state, several concentrations of Jewish population outside those areas (West Jerusalem and Western Galilee), and areas along the roads where the invading Arab armies were expected to attack.

The Yishuv perceived the peril of an Arab invasion as threatening its very existence. Having no real knowledge of the Arabs' true military capabilities, the Jews took Arab propaganda literally, preparing for the worst and reacting accordingly.

=== Arab League as a whole ===
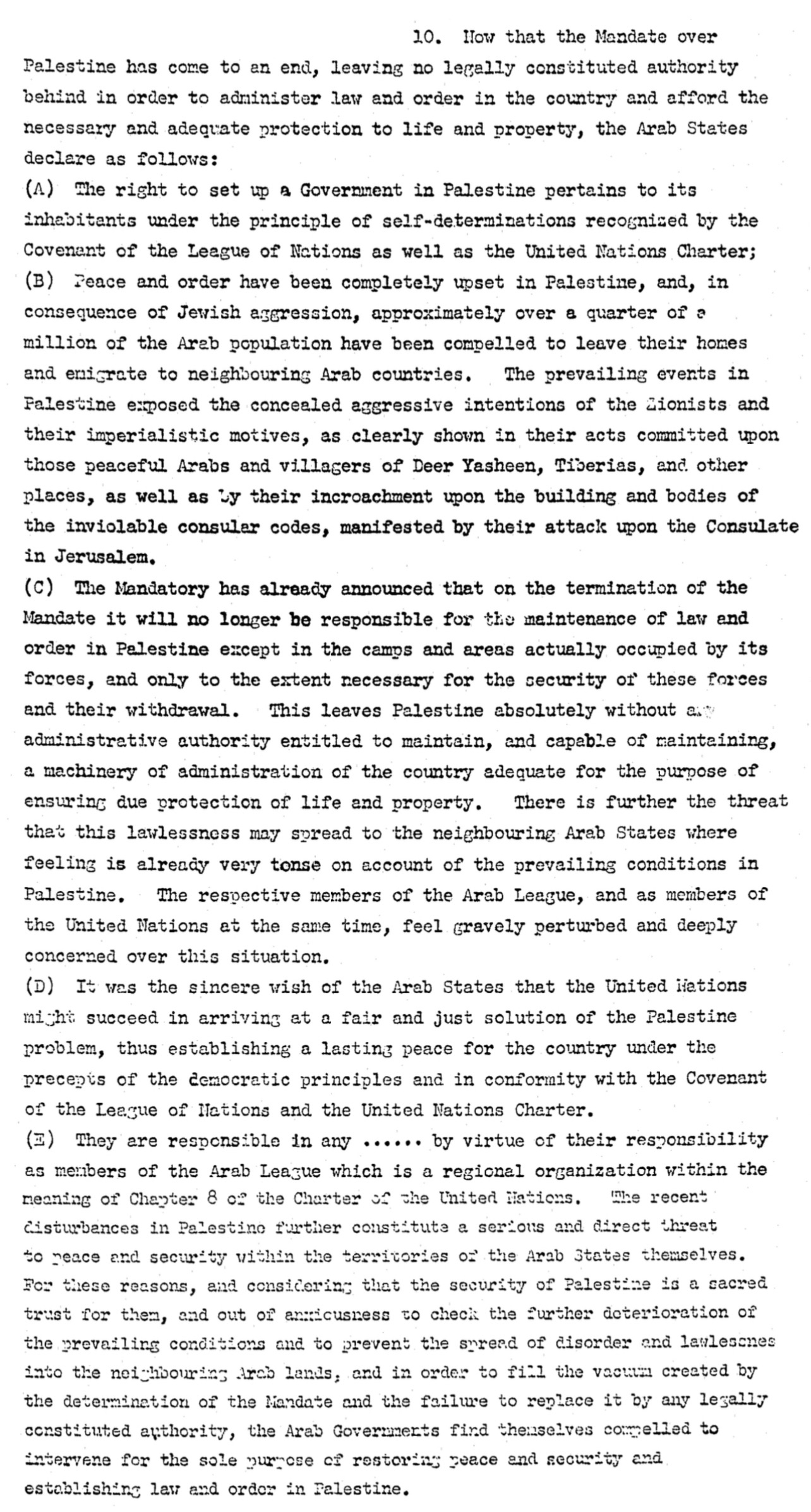
Clause 10 of the 15 May 1948 Arab League cablegram explaining the reasons for their entry into the territory

The Arab League had unanimously rejected the UN partition plan and were officially opposed to the establishment of a Jewish state alongside an Arab one.

The Arab League before partition affirmed the right to the independence of Palestine, while blocking the creation of a Palestinian government. Towards the end of 1947, the League established a military committee commanded by the retired Iraqi general Isma'il Safwat whose mission was to analyse the chance of victory of the Palestinians against the Jews. His conclusions were that they had no chance of victory and that an invasion of the Arab regular armies was mandatory. The political committee nevertheless rejected these conclusions and decided to support an armed opposition to the Partition Plan excluding the participation of their regular armed forces.

In April with the Palestinian defeat, the refugees coming from Palestine and the pressure of their public opinion, the Arab leaders decided to invade Palestine.

The Arab League gave reasons for its invasion in Palestine in the cablegram:

- the Arab states find themselves compelled to intervene in order to restore law and order and to check further bloodshed.
- the Mandate over Palestine has come to an end, leaving no legally constituted authority.
- the only solution of the Palestine problem is the establishment of a unitary Palestinian state.

British diplomat Alec Kirkbride wrote in his 1976 memoirs about a conversation with the Arab League's secretary-general Azzam Pasha a week before the armies marched: "...when I asked him for his estimate of the size of the Jewish forces, [he] waved his hands and said: 'It does not matter how many there are. We will sweep them into the sea.'" However, Kirkbride notes that Azzam was nervous about the impending conflict; he had not slept the night before.

According to Gelber, the Arab countries were "drawn into the war by the collapse of the Palestinian Arabs and the Arab Liberation Army [and] the Arab governments' primary goal was preventing the Palestinian Arabs' total ruin and the flooding of their own countries by more refugees. According to their own perception, had the invasion not taken place, there was no Arab force in Palestine capable of checking the Haganah's offensive".

=== King Abdullah I of Transjordan ===
King Abdullah was the commander of the Arab Legion, the strongest Arab army involved in the war according to Eugene Rogan and Avi Shlaim in 2007. (In contrast, Morris wrote in 2008 that the Egyptian army was the most powerful and threatening army.) The Arab Legion had about 10,000 soldiers, trained and commanded by British officers.

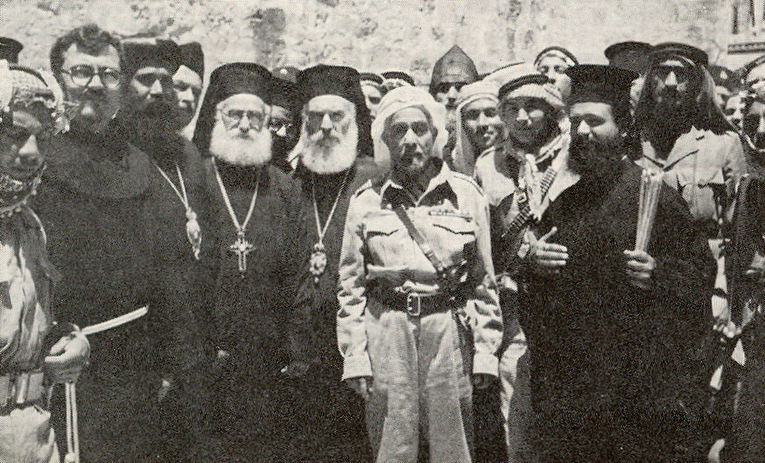
King Abdullah outside the Church of the Holy Sepulchre, 29 May 1948, the day after Jordanian forces took control of the Old City in the Battle for Jerusalem

In 1946–47, Abdullah said that he had no intention to "resist or impede the partition of Palestine and creation of a Jewish state." Ideally, Abdullah would have liked to annex all of Palestine, but he was prepared to compromise. He supported the partition, intending that the West Bank area of the British Mandate allocated for the Arab state be annexed to Jordan. Abdullah held secret meetings with the Jewish Agency (at which the future Israeli Prime Minister Golda Meir was among the delegates) that reached an agreement of Jewish non-interference with Jordanian annexation of the West Bank (although Abdullah failed in his goal of acquiring an outlet to the Mediterranean Sea through the Negev desert) and of Jordanian agreement not to attack the area of the Jewish state contained in the United Nations partition resolution (in which Jerusalem was given neither to the Arab nor the Jewish state, but was to be an internationally administered area). In order to keep their support to his plan of annexation of the Arab State, Abdullah promised to the British he would not attack the Jewish State.

The neighbouring Arab states pressured Abdullah into joining them in an "all-Arab military invasion" against the newly created State of Israel, that he used to restore his prestige in the Arab world, which had grown suspicious of his relatively good relationship with Western and Jewish leaders. Jordan's undertakings not to cross partition lines were not taken at face value. While repeating assurances that Jordan would only take areas allocated to a future Arab state, on the eve of war Tawfik Abu al-Huda told the British that were other Arab armies to advance against Israel, Jordan would follow suit. On 23 May Abdullah told the French consul in Amman that he "was determined to fight Zionism and prevent the establishment of an Israeli state on the border of his kingdom".

Abdullah's role in this war became substantial. He saw himself as the "supreme commander of the Arab forces" and "persuaded the Arab League to appoint him" to this position. Through his leadership, the Arabs fought the 1948 war to meet Abdullah's political goals.

=== Other Arab states ===
King Farouk of Egypt was anxious to prevent Abdullah from being seen as the main champion of the Arab world in Palestine, which he feared might damage his own leadership aspirations of the Arab world. In addition, Farouk wished to annex all of southern Palestine to Egypt. According to Gamal Abdel Nasser the Egyptian Ministry of Defence's first communique describe the Palestine operations as a merely punitive expedition against the Zionist "gangs", using a term frequent in Haganah reports of Palestinian fighters. According to a 2019 study, "senior British intelligence, military officers and diplomats in Cairo were deeply involved in a covert scheme to drive the King to participate in the Arab states' war coalition against Israel." These intelligence officers acted without the approval or knowledge of the British government.

Nuri as-Said, the strongman of Iraq, had ambitions for bringing the entire Fertile Crescent under Iraqi leadership. Both Syria and Lebanon wished to take certain areas of northern Palestine.

One result of the ambitions of the various Arab leaders was a distrust of all the Palestinian leaders who wished to set up a Palestinian state, and a mutual distrust of each other. Co-operation was to be very poor during the war between the various Palestinian factions and the Arab armies.

=== Arab Higher Committee of Amin al-Husayni ===
Following rumours that King Abdullah was re-opening the bilateral negotiations with Israel that he had previously conducted in secret with the Jewish Agency, the Arab League, led by Egypt, decided to set up the All-Palestine Government in Gaza on 8 September under the nominal leadership of the Mufti. Abdullah regarded the attempt to revive al-Husayni's Holy War Army as a challenge to his authority and all armed bodies operating in the areas controlled by the Arab Legion were disbanded. Glubb Pasha carried out the order ruthlessly and efficiently.

== Initial line-up of forces ==
=== Military assessments ===
Though the State of Israel faced the armies of multiple neighbouring Arab countries, due to previous battles the Palestinians themselves hardly existed as a military force by the middle of May. British intelligence and the Arab League reached similar conclusions.

The British Foreign Office and the CIA believed that the Arab states would finally win in case of war. Israeli military historian Martin Van Creveld says the sides were fairly evenly matched in manpower at the beginning of the war, but the ratio shifted in Israel's favor as it went on.

In May, Egyptian generals told their government that the invasion would be "a parade without any risks" and Tel Aviv would be taken "in two weeks." Egypt, Iraq, and Syria all possessed air forces, Egypt and Syria had tanks, and all had some modern artillery. Initially, the Haganah had no heavy machine guns, artillery, armoured vehicles, anti-tank or anti-aircraft weapons, nor military aircraft or tanks. The four Arab armies that invaded on 15 May were far stronger than the Haganah formations they initially encountered.

On 12 May, three days before the invasion, David Ben-Gurion was told by his chief military advisers (who over-estimated the size of the Arab armies and the numbers and efficiency of the troops who would be committed – much as the Arab generals tended to exaggerate Jewish fighters' strength) that Israel's chances of winning a war against the Arab states were only about even.

=== Yishuv/Israeli forces ===
The primary Jewish military force in Palestine was the Haganah, which was subordinate to the official leadership of the Yishuv that became the provisional Israeli government. From November 1947, with the outbreak of the 1947–1948 civil war in Mandatory Palestine, it began reorganizing, changing from a territorial militia to resemble a regular army. By April and May 1948, it was conducting brigade-sized operations. Mobilization of the Yishuv began during the civil war period with conscription instituted. Following independence it was initially Israel's main military force. The Haganah was joined by two smaller independent militias, the Irgun and Lehi. They consisted of political dissidents from the mainstream leadership and at times had come into conflict with the Haganah, but fought alongside it during the civil war and early stages of the war with the Arab states. On 26 May 1948, Prime Minister David Ben-Gurion issued an order for the formation of the Israel Defense Forces as the unified military force of Israel, which was ratified by the Israeli cabinet on 31 May. The order called for the disbandment of all other Jewish armed forces. Subsequently, the Haganah, Irgun, and Lehi were merged into the IDF, although the Irgun and Lehi retained independent presences in Jerusalem and the Irgun recruits into the IDF were initially placed together in their own units. After the Altalena Affair, an attempt by the Irgun to import arms in June 1948 that resulted in clashes with the IDF, the independent Irgun units within the IDF were broken up, with the soldiers dispersed between various units. Following the assassination of Folke Bernadotte by Lehi in September 1948, the Israeli government lost its last remaining tolerance for independent militias and broke up the Irgun and Lehi remnants in Jerusalem.

Training and experience gained by volunteers from the Yishuv in the British Armed Forces during World War II was decisive in building a new military. Some 30,000 Jews from Palestine served in the British military during the war. The military training and discipline, organizational skills, and combat experience they gained were of great benefit in building the IDF and fighting the war. They proved important to the Haganah's efforts to train its personnel and helped establish the IDF's General Staff, its artillery, engineering, logistics, and medical services, as well as the fledgling air force and navy. Veterans of the Jewish Brigade, a British Army brigade group composed primarily of Jews from the Yishuv that fought in the Italian campaign towards the end of the war, were heavily represented in building the IDF, with many Jewish Brigade veterans serving as officers during the war. A handful of Yishuv volunteers served as aircrews, including pilots, and hundreds more as ground crews in the Royal Air Force, which would benefit Israel's new air force. Members of the Yishuv who had served in the Royal Navy and British Merchant Navy during World War II proceeded to serve in the Israeli Navy during the 1948 war. The Haganah's elite strike force, the Palmach, had also received British training as preparation for a possible German invasion of Palestine and took part in missions against Vichy French forces in Syria and Lebanon. In addition, thousands of foreign volunteers, mostly World War II veterans of Allied militaries, served in the IDF during the war in what became known as Mahal, bringing their skills and experience to the IDF. Most were Jews, but some non-Jews also served. They were both ideologically-motivated volunteers and mercenaries. Most of Israel's air and ground crews were Mahal volunteers from English-speaking countries, resulting in English being the main language of the Israeli Air Force during the war. Other Mahal volunteers included sailors, tank crews, doctors, and logistics and communications personnel. As well as experience from World War II, the 1947–1948 civil war against Arab militias prior to the invasion of the Arab armies provided additional combat experience for units and fighters, most of whom were new recruits.

Sources disagree about the quantity of arms at the Yishuv's disposal at the end of the Mandate. According to Efraim Karsh before the arrival shipments from Czechoslovakia as part of Operation Balak, there was roughly one weapon for every three fighters, and even the Palmach could arm only two out of every three of its active members. According to Larry Collins and Dominique Lapierre, by April 1948, the Haganah had accumulated only about 20,000 rifles and Sten guns for the 35,000 soldiers who existed on paper. According to Walid Khalidi, "the arms at the disposal of these forces were plentiful". According to Benny Morris, on 15 May only about 60% of Haganah troops had weapons, but the amount of weapons available rapidly increased due to massive shipments from abroad as well as domestic manufacturing.

Yishuv forces were organized in nine brigades, and their numbers grew following Israeli independence, eventually expanding to twelve brigades. Although both sides increased their manpower over the first few months of the war, the Israeli forces grew steadily as a result of the progressive mobilisation of Israeli society and the influx of an average of 10,300 immigrants each month. By the end of 1948, the Israel Defense Forces had 88,033 soldiers, including 60,000 combat soldiers.

Brigade	Commander	Size	Operations
Golani	Moshe Mann	4,500	Dekel, Hiram
Carmeli	Moshe Carmel	2,000	Hiram
Alexandroni	Dan Even	5,200	Latrun, Hametz
Kiryati	Michael Ben-Gal	1,400	Dani, Hametz
Givati	Shimon Avidan	5,000	Hametz, Barak, Pleshet
Etzioni	David Shaltiel		Battle of Jerusalem, Shfifon, Yevusi, Battle of Ramat Rachel
7th Armoured	Shlomo Shamir		Battles of Latrun
8th Armoured	Yitzhak Sadeh		Danny, Yoav, Horev
Oded	Avraham Yoffe		Yoav, Hiram
Harel	Yitzhak Rabin	1,400	Nachshon, Danny
Yiftach	Yigal Allon	4,500 inc. some Golani	Yiftah, Danny, Yoav, Battles of Latrun
Negev	Nahum Sarig	2,400	Yoav

France authorised Air France to transport cargo to Tel Aviv on 13 May. After the invasion, France allowed aircraft carrying arms from Czechoslovakia to land on French territory in transit to Israel, and permitted two arms shipments to "Nicaragua", which were actually intended for Israel.

Czechoslovakia supplied vast quantities of arms to Israel during the war, including thousands of vz. 24 rifles and MG 34 and ZB 37 machine guns, and millions of rounds of ammunition. Czechoslovakia supplied fighter aircraft, including at first ten Avia S-199 fighter planes.

Haganah agents in Western Europe had amassed fifty 65mm French mountain guns, twelve 120mm mortars, ten H-35 light tanks, and a large number of half-tracks. The Haganah readied twelve cargo ships throughout European ports to transfer the equipment, which would set sail as soon as the British blockade lifted at the end of the Mandate.

In addition to arms shipments from abroad, Israel's local domestic arms industry produced substantial quantities of weapons and ammunition, as well as dozens of makeshift armored cars and trucks.

Following independence, the Israelis managed to build three Sherman tanks from scrap-heap material found in abandoned British ordnance depots. Israeli agents in Italy subsequently purchased 32 Sherman tanks, which arrived in three shipments from November 1948 to January 1949. Although still in serviceable condition, the tanks' gun barrels had been destroyed to prevent them from firing, so it was decided to install Krupp field guns that had been purchased from Switzerland in September 1948 with the intent to use them for field artillery, but the conversion proved complicated and it is likely that none of the Shermans with Krupp guns were ready until the war was over. However, three 75mm M3 tank guns were also purchased in Italy and these were fitted onto three Shermans in time for them to take part in combat.

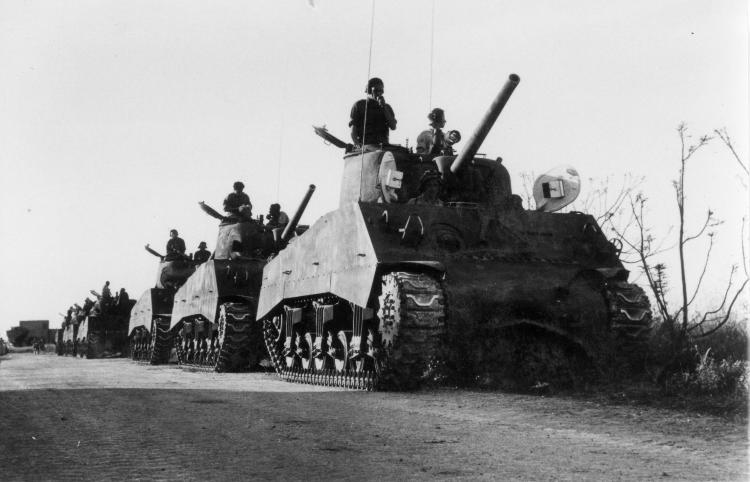
Sherman tanks of the Israeli 8th Armoured Brigade, 1948

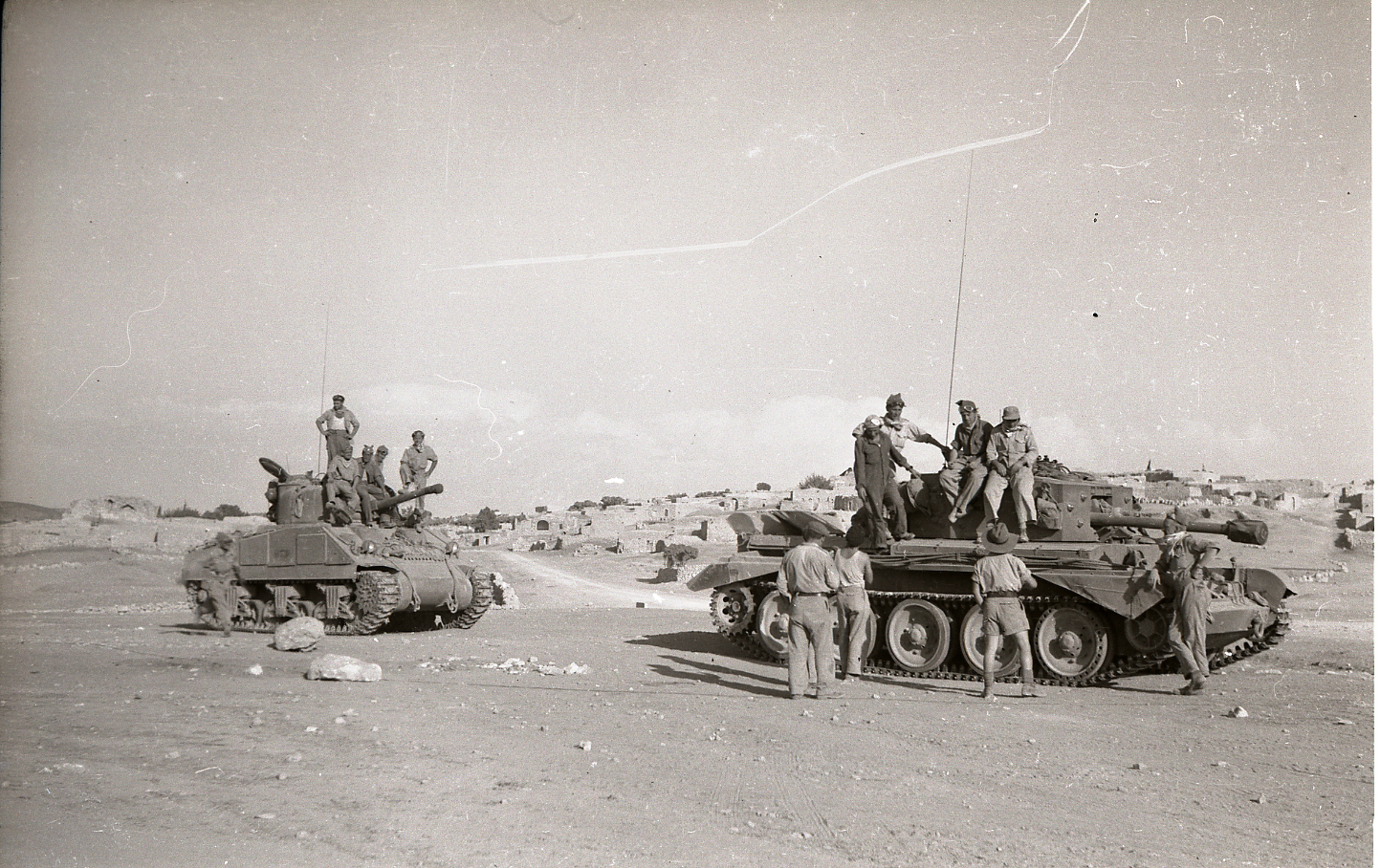
An Israeli Cromwell tank to the right and a Sherman tank to the left. In addition to its fleet of Shermans, the Israeli Armored Corps operated two Cromwell tanks.

The Haganah also managed to obtain stocks of British weapons due to the logistical complexity of the British withdrawal, and the corruption of a number of officials. The equipment obtained included twelve armored cars, four of which had cannons, and three half-tracks. On 29 June 1948, the day before the last British troops left Haifa, two British soldiers sympathetic to the Israelis stole two Cromwell tanks from an arms depot in the Haifa port area, smashing them through the unguarded gates, and joined the IDF. These two tanks would form the basis of the Israeli Armored Corps.

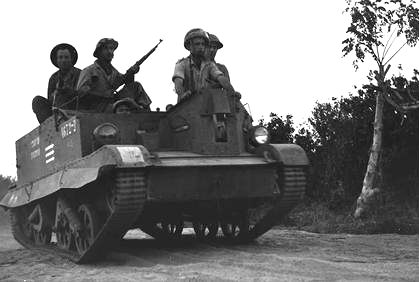
IDF soldiers of the Samson's Foxes unit advance in a captured Egyptian Bren Gun carrier.

After the first truce, by July 1948, the Israelis had established an air force, a navy, and a tank battalion.

After the second truce, Czechoslovakia supplied Supermarine Spitfire fighter planes, which were smuggled to Israel via an abandoned Luftwaffe runway in Yugoslavia, with the agreement of the Yugoslav government. The airborne arms smuggling missions from Czechoslovakia were codenamed Operation Balak.

=== Arab forces ===
At the invasion, in addition to the irregular Palestinian militia groups, the five Arab states that joined the war were Egypt, Transjordan, Syria, Lebanon and Iraq sending expeditionary forces of their regular armies. Additional contingents came from Saudi Arabia and Yemen. On the eve of war, the available number of Arab troops likely to be committed was between 23,500 and 26,500 (10,000 Egyptians, 4,500 Jordanians, 3,000 Iraqis, 3,000–6,000 Syrians, 2,000 ALA volunteers, 1,000 Lebanese, and several hundred Saudis), in addition to the irregular Palestinians already present. These Arab forces had been trained by British and French instructors; this was particularly true of Jordan's Arab Legion under command of Lt Gen Sir John Bagot Glubb (known as Glubb Pasha).

Syria bought a quantity of small arms for the Arab Liberation Army from Czechoslovakia, but the shipment never arrived due to Haganah force intervention.

==== Arab states ====
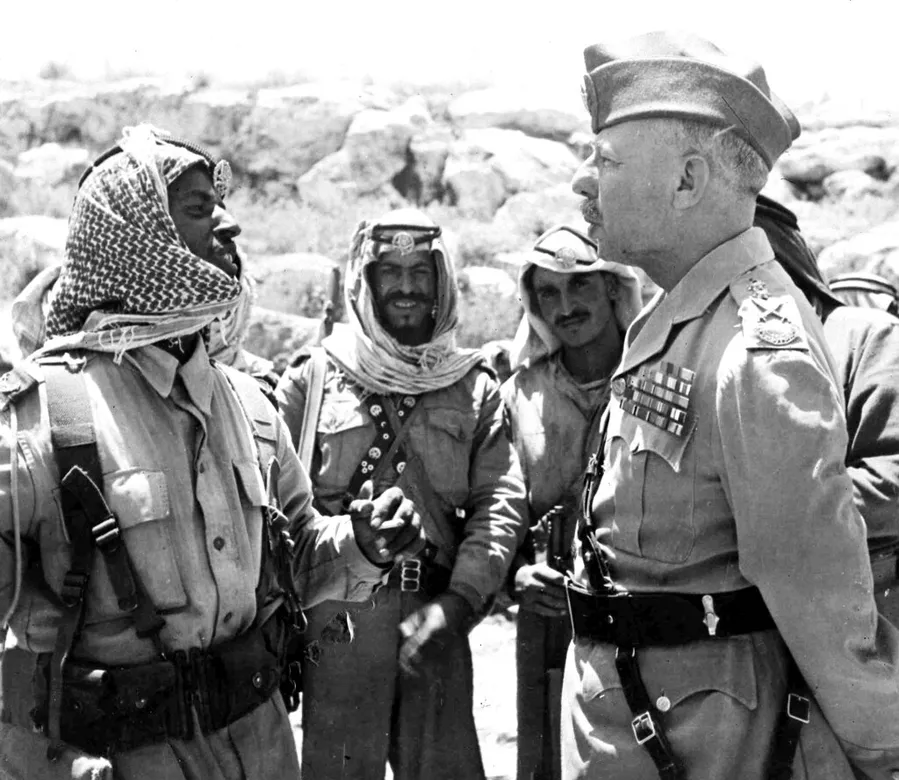
John Bagot Glubb (right), commander of the Jordanian Arab Legion with soldiers in July 1948

Jordan's Arab Legion was considered the most effective Arab force. Armed, trained and commanded by British officers, this 8,000–12,000 strong force was organised in four infantry/mechanised regiments supported by some forty artillery pieces and seventy-five armoured cars. Until January 1948, it was reinforced by the 3,000-strong Transjordan Frontier Force. As many as 48 British officers served in the Arab Legion. The commander of the Arab Legion was a British officer, John Bagot Glubb, also known as "Glubb Pasha". The Legion was organized into four brigades as follows:

Military Division	Commander	Rank	Military Zone of operations
First Brigade, includes: 1st and 3rd regiments	Desmond Goldie	Colonel	Nablus Military Zone
Second Brigade, includes: Fifth and Sixth Regiments	Sam Sidney Arthur Cooke	Brigadier	Support force
Third Brigade, includes: Second and Fourth Regiments	Teel Ashton	Colonel	Ramallah Military Zone
Fourth Brigade	Ahmad Sudqi al-Jundi	Colonel	Support: Ramallah, Hebron, and Ramla

The Arab Legion joined the war in May 1948, but fought only in the area that King Abdullah wanted to secure for Jordan: the West Bank, including East Jerusalem.

France prevented a large sale of arms by a Swiss company to Ethiopia, brokered by the UK foreign office, which was actually destined for Egypt and Jordan, and denied a British request at the end of April to land a squadron of British aircraft on its way to Transjordan, and applied diplomatic pressure on Belgium to suspend arms sales to the Arab states.

The Jordanian forces were probably the best trained of all combatants. Other combatant forces lacked the ability to make strategic decisions and tactical manoeuvres, as evidenced by positioning the fourth regiment at Latrun, which was abandoned by ALA combatants before the arrival of the Jordanian forces and the importance of which was not fully understood by the Haganah. In the later stages of the war, Latrun proved to be of high strategic importance for its access to roads and proximity to Jerusalem, with some of the most successful Arab and Jordanian fighting occurring there.

In 1948, Iraq's army had 21,000 men in twelve brigades and the Iraqi Air Force had 100 planes, mostly British. Initially the Iraqis committed around 3,000 men to the war effort, including four infantry brigades, one armoured battalion and support personnel. These were to operate under Jordanian guidance. The first Iraqi forces to be deployed reached Jordan in April 1948 under the command of Gen. Nur ad-Din Mahmud.

In 1948, Egypt's army was able to put a maximum of around 40,000 men into the field, 80% of its military-age male population were unfit for military service, and its embryonic logistics system was limited in its ability to support ground forces beyond its borders. Initially, an expeditionary force of 10,000 men was sent to Palestine under the command of Maj. Gen. Ahmed Ali al-Mwawi. This consisted of five infantry battalions, one armoured battalion equipped with British Light Tank Mk VI and Matilda tanks, one battalion of sixteen 25-pounder guns, a battalion of eight 6-pounder guns and one medium-machine-gun battalion with supporting troops.

The Egyptian Air Force had over thirty Spitfires, four Hawker Hurricanes and twenty C47s modified into crude bombers.

Syria had 12,000 soldiers at the beginning of the 1948 War, grouped into three infantry brigades and an armoured force of approximately battalion size. The Syrian Air Force had forty-three planes, thirty-seven operational, of which approximately the ten newest were World War II–generation models.

France suspended arms sales to Syria, notwithstanding already-signed contracts.

Lebanon's army was the smallest of the Arab states, consisting of 3,500 soldiers, of whom only 1,000 were deployed during the war. In 1948, the Lebanese army contained of four infantry battalions, one artillery battalion, one armored battalion, a cavalry group as well as transport engineering and medical support units. Each infantry battalion averaged 500–550 men, with 450 soldiers per battalion, and contained three infantry companies. Only the third battalion saw battle. According to Gelber, in June 1947, Ben-Gurion "arrived at an agreement with the Maronite religious leadership in Lebanon that cost a few thousand pounds and kept Lebanon's army out of the War of Independence and the military Arab coalition". A token force of 436 soldiers crossed into the northern Galilee, seized two villages after a small skirmish, and withdrew. Israel then invaded and occupied southern Lebanon until the end of the war.

By the time of the second truce, the Egyptians had 20,000 men in the field in thirteen battalions equipped with 135 tanks and 90 artillery pieces.

During the first truce, the Iraqis increased their force to about 10,000. Ultimately, the Iraqi expeditionary force numbered around 18,000 men.

Saudi Arabia sent hundreds of volunteers to join the Arab forces. In February 1948, around 800 tribesmen had gathered near Aqaba to invade the Negev, but crossed to Egypt after Saudi rival King Abdallah denied them permission to pass through Jordanian territory. The Saudi troops were attached to the Egyptian command throughout the war, and estimates of their total strength ranged up to 1,200. By July 1948, the Saudis constituted three brigades within the Egyptian expeditionary force, and were stationed as guards between Gaza city and Rafah. This area came under heavy aerial bombardment during Operation Yoav in October, and faced a land assault beginning in late December which culminated in the Battle of Rafah in early January of the new year. With the subsequent armistice of 24 February 1949 and evacuation of almost 4,000 Arab soldiers and civilians from Gaza, the Saudi contingent withdrew through Arish and returned to Saudi Arabia.

During the first truce, Sudan sent six companies of regular troops to fight alongside the Egyptians. Yemen also committed a small expeditionary force to the war effort, and contingents from Morocco joined the Arab armies as well.

== Course of the war ==
At the last moment, several Arab leaders, to avert catastrophe – secretly appealed to the British to hold on in Palestine for at least another year.

=== First phase: 15 May – 11 June 1948 ===
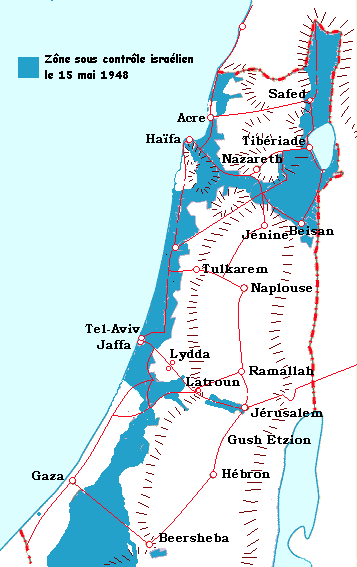
Areas under Israeli control in blue on 15 May 1948

Arab offensive, 15 May – 10 June 1948

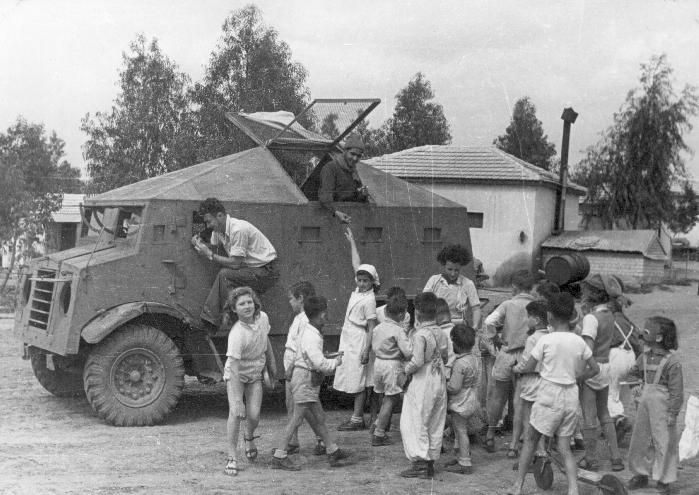
A "Butterfly" improvised armored car of the Haganah at Kibbutz Dorot in the Negev, April 1948. The armored car is based on CMP-15 truck. The car has brought supplies to the kibbutz. Children of kibbutzim in the Negev were later evacuated by these cars ahead of the Egyptian advance.

The civil war in Mandatory Palestine became a war between separate states with the declaration of the establishment of the State of Israel on 14 May 1948, a few hours before the termination of the British Mandate of Palestine at midnight. The following morning, the regular armies of neighbouring Arab states – Egypt, Transjordan and Syria – invaded the region.

Through Plan Dalet, Zionist forces had already, from 1 April down to 14 May, conducted 8 of their 13 full-scale military operations outside of the area allotted to a Jewish state by partition, and the operational commander Yigal Allon later stated that had it not been for the Arab invasion, Haganah forces would have reached 'the natural borders of western Israel.' By 15 May 1948, when the Mandate formally expired and the State of Israel came into being, Israel controlled two contiguous and connected strips of Palestine which contained the main Jewish settlement concentrations. One ran along the coastal plain from Rosh Hanikra to Rehovot, with two additional appendages emanating from its southern end, one running to West Jerusalem and the other to the Jewish settlement bloc in the Negev which was connected by a sliver of land near Negba. The other strip was in the Galilee Panhandle, Jordan Valley, and Beit She'an Valley. These two strips were narrowly linked by the Israeli-held Jezreel Valley. The Arabs held the rest of Palestine, including a small Arab Liberation Army-supported enclave just south of Haifa.

Although the Arab invasion was denounced by the United States, the Soviet Union, and UN secretary-general Trygve Lie, it found support from the Republic of China and other UN member states.

The initial Arab plans called for Syrian and Lebanese forces to invade from north while Jordanian and Iraqi forces were to invade from east in order to meet at Nazareth and then to push forward together to Haifa. In the south, the Egyptians were to advance and take Tel Aviv. At the Arab League meeting in Damascus on 11–13 May, Abdullah rejected the plan, which served Syrian interests, using the fact his allies were afraid to go to war without his army. He proposed that the Iraqis attack the Jezreel valley and the Arab Legion enter Ramallah and Nablus and link with the Egyptian army at Hebron, which was more in compliance with his political objective to occupy the territory allocated to the Arab State by the partition plan and promises not to invade the territory allocated to the Jewish State by the partition plan. In addition, Lebanon decided not to take part in the war at the last minute, due to the still-influential Christians' opposition, encouraged by Jewish bribes.

Intelligence provided by the French consulate in Jerusalem on 12 May 1948 on the Arab armies' invading forces and their revised plan to invade the new state contributed to Israel's success in withstanding the Arab invasion.

The first mission of the Jewish forces was to hold on against the Arab armies and stop them, although the Arabs began the war with major advantages such as the initiative and vastly superior firepower.

==== Southern front – Negev ====
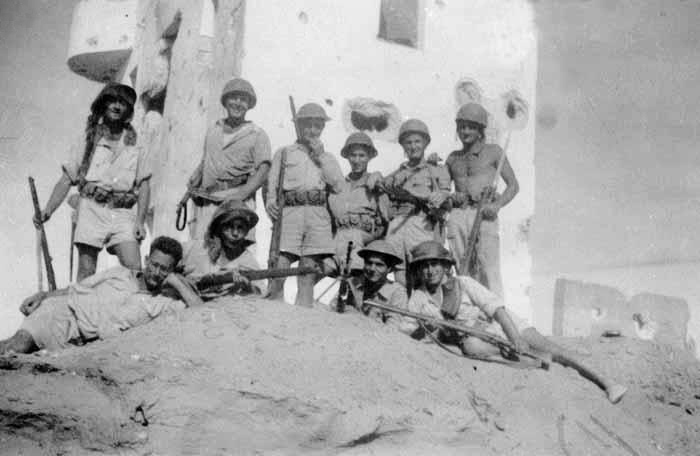
Israeli soldiers in Nirim

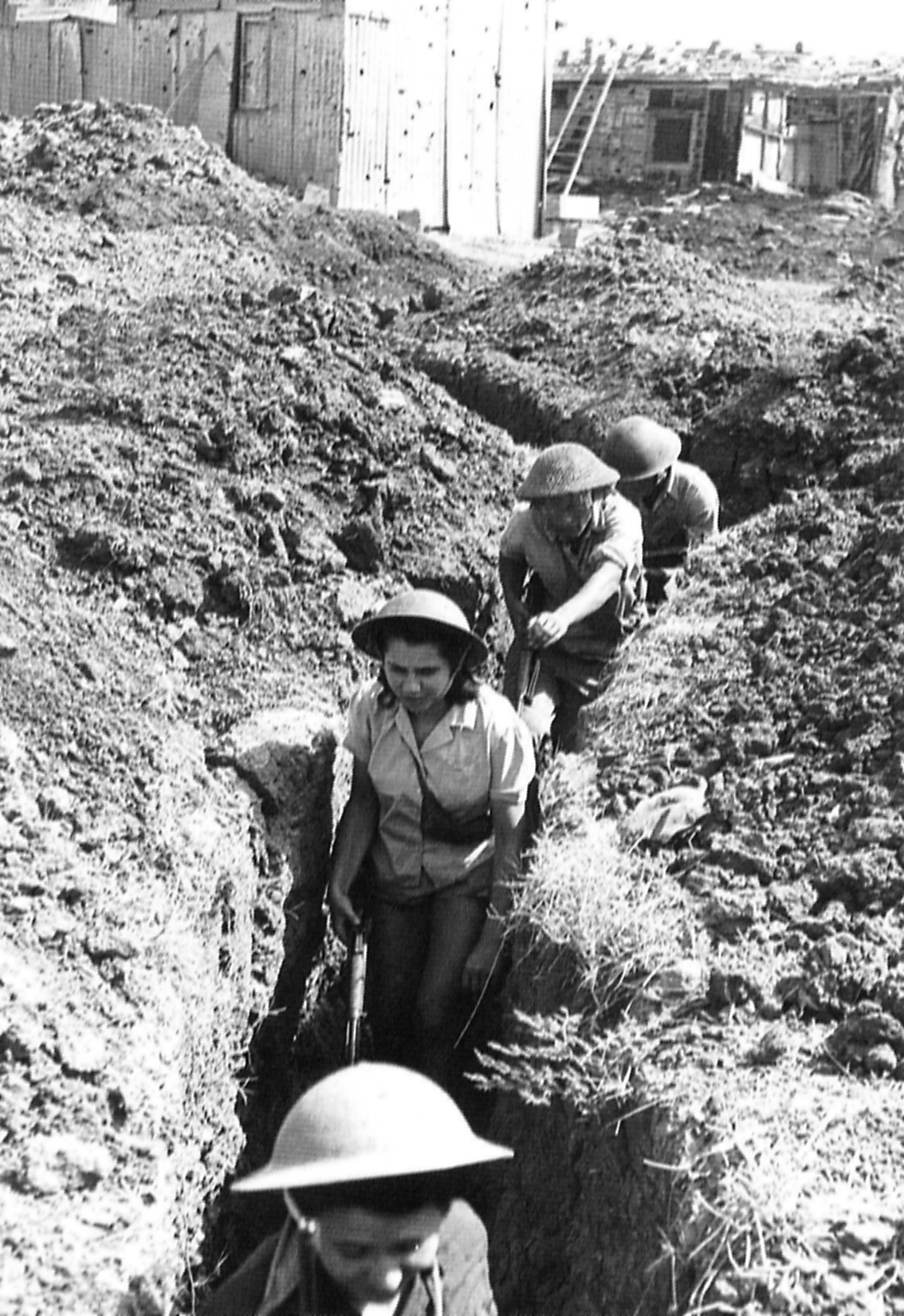
Israeli soldiers in Negba

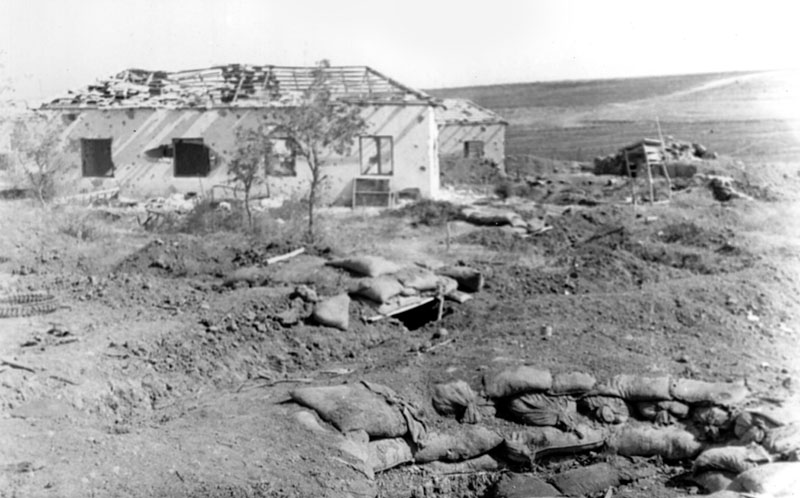
Nitzanim after the Egyptian bombardment

The Egyptian force, the largest among the Arab armies, invaded from the south. The Egyptian invasion was preceded by the entry of smaller forces of Muslim Brotherhood volunteers in April and Egyptian Army volunteers on 6 May, before the end of the Mandate.

With the end of the Mandate, the Egyptian task force, composed of Egyptian troops and Muslim Brotherhood volunteers, entered the Negev. The main Egyptian force advanced north in the direction of Tel Aviv while a mixed force of Egyptian troops and Muslim Brotherhood volunteers broke off from the main force and advanced east, occupying Beersheba on 19 May before advancing to the Hebron Hills. It participated in combat alongside the Arab Legion and local irregulars at kibbutz Ramat Rachel. The presence of Israeli kibbutzim along the path of main force's thrust north was seen as a threat due to their potential to cut off forward units and harass supply convoys. To secure their flanks, the Egyptians attacked and laid siege to numerous kibbutzim, expending great resources in attempting to capture them. The defenders of these settlements held out fiercely for days against vastly superior forces, and managed to buy valuable time for the Israelis to reposition their forces and deploy the heavy weaponry now entering the country.

On 15 May 1948, the Egyptians attacked two settlements: Nirim, using artillery, armored cars carrying cannons, and Bren carriers; and Kfar Darom using artillery, tanks and aircraft. The Egyptians' attacks met fierce resistance from the few and lightly armed defenders of both settlements, and failed. On 19 May the Egyptians attacked Yad Mordechai, where an inferior force of 100 Israelis armed with nothing more than rifles, a medium machine gun and a PIAT anti-tank weapon, held up a column of 2,500 Egyptians, well-supported by armor, artillery and aircraft, for five days. The Egyptians took heavy losses, while the losses sustained by the defenders were comparatively light. A number of other kibbutzim were heavily shelled but not assaulted.

During the last week of May, Israeli units of the Negev and Givati Brigades harassed the Egyptians. In addition, the embryonic Israeli Air Force periodically bombed the Gaza City area, where the Egyptian force's headquarters was located, using converted civilian aircraft. On 24 May, the Egyptians reached Majdal and made it their headquarters, briefly stopping and setting up a defensive perimeter.

The Egyptians achieved a crucial success when a battalion advanced east from Majdal and managed to link up with the Egyptian force in the Hebron Hills. The Egyptians dug themselves in, cutting off numerous Israeli settlements as well as the Negev Brigade. However, this also resulted in Egyptian forces becoming more overstretched.

On 28 May the Egyptians renewed their northern advance, and stopped at a destroyed bridge north to Isdud. The Givati Brigade reported this advance but no fighters were sent to confront the Egyptians. Had the Egyptians wished to continue their advance northward towards Tel Aviv, the only Israeli forces positioned to block them were two and a half companies of the Givati Brigade.

On 2 June, an Egyptian battalion attacked Negba and was beaten back by the kibbutz's 140 defenders. The Israelis lost 8 killed and 11 wounded while inflicting an estimated 100 casualties on the Egyptians.

From 29 May to 3 June, Israeli forces stopped the Egyptian drive north in Operation Pleshet. It began with attacks by Israel's fledgling air force. Isrseli aircraft attacked Egyptian positions at Isdud. The Israeli planes dropped 70 kilogram bombs and strafed enemy positions, although their machine guns quickly jammed. One plane was shot down and another crashed. The attacks caused the Egyptians to scatter, and they had lost the initiative by the time they had regrouped. Following the air attacks, the Givati Brigade launched a counterattack against Egyptian forces in Isdud supported by a battery of 65mm Napoleonchik cannons and two 120mm mortars. The counterattack was repulsed, although Israeli troops managed to briefly capture houses on the village's outskirts before being pushed back. Despite having held their ground, the Egyptian command was alarmed by the counterattack. They feared that their forces might be cut off. This fear was exacerbated when Givati Brigade troops ambushed an Egyptian supply column just south of Isdud. The Egyptian offensive was halted as Egypt changed its strategy from offensive to defensive, and the initiative shifted to Israel. The Israelis lost 45 killed or missing, 50 wounded, and 5 captured. Egyptian losses were variously reported as 7–15 killed and 18–30 wounded, although these may only be partial figures.

On 6 June, in the Battle of Nitzanim, Egyptian forces attacked the kibbutz of Nitzanim, located between Majdal and Isdud, and the Israeli defenders surrendered after resisting for five days. Shortly before the first truce was to come into effect, an Israeli counterattack to retake the kibbutz failed and the Israelis retreated to nearby Hill 69, which was subsequently attacked and conquered by the Egyptians causing the Israelis to retreat further. The Egyptians then captured a major crossroads and attempted to continue towards Beit Daras and Be'er Tuvia but ran into fierce resistance and withdrew. However, Israeli forces managed to occupy a number of hilltop positions and villages along the front line, although they failed to conquer the Tegart fort at Iraq Suwaydan. By the time the first truce came into effect, the Egyptians were in scattered positions across the Negev to the Hebron area and incapable of mounting a serious offensive.

==== Jerusalem and Latrun ====
The heaviest fighting occurred in Jerusalem and on the Jerusalem – Tel Aviv road, between Jordan's Arab Legion and Israeli forces.

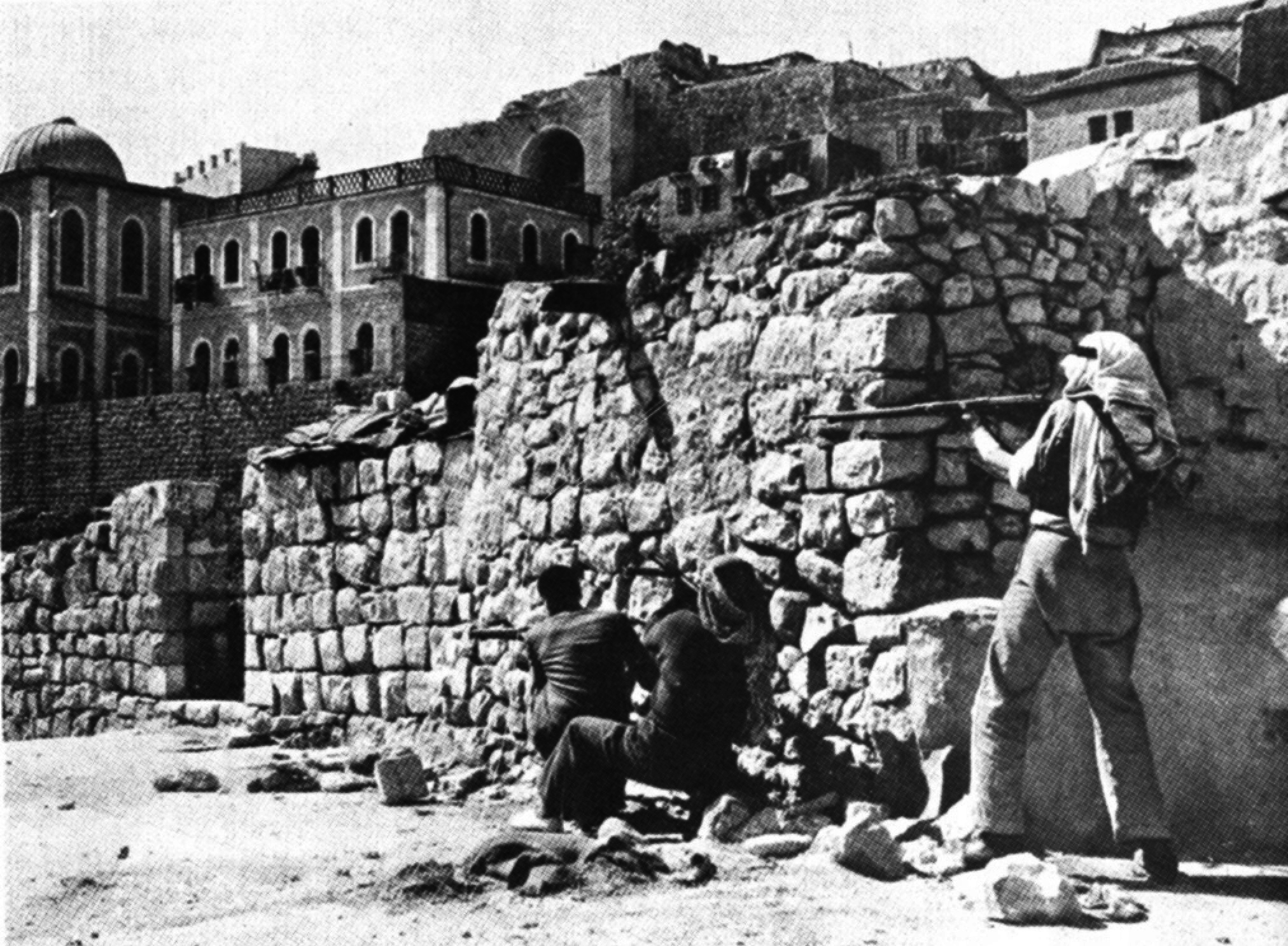
Arab Legion soldiers during fighting in the Jewish Quarter

With the termination of the Mandate, the Arab Legion entered eastern Palestine. Its units swiftly reached Jericho, Nablus, Ramallah, and Latrun, facing no resistance. The original Jordanian plan had been to avoid Jerusalem, as Jordan had promised the British a peaceful takeover of Arab areas in eastern Palestine and entering Jerusalem would both go against the UN plan for it to be an international zone and result in combat. However, after British control over Jerusalem ended, the Haganah and Irgun rapidly seized control in parts of the city, taking over British outposts in the Old City in Operation Shfifon a day before the Israeli declaration of independence followed by the rapid seizure of numerous other areas of the city in Operation Pitchfork. Arab refugees fled Jerusalem in large numbers, and the city's Arab notables sent appeals to King Abdullah and the Arab Legion's commander John Bagot Glubb asking for help. In addition, King Abdullah was probably also motivated to intervene over the city's political and religious significance, as well as the fact that he would be blamed for the fall of East Jerusalem by the Arab world, Israeli forces could potentially advance to Jericho from Jerusalem and cut off his forces, the graves of his father and brother Faisal were located there, and annexing an area as important as that would make his kingdom more significant. The easy occupation of eastern Palestine also likely gave him an appetite for further conquest as he talked of conquering West Jerusalem and Tel Aviv for several days. It was finally decided to assault Jerusalem. King Abdullah ordered Glubb to enter Jerusalem on 17 May.

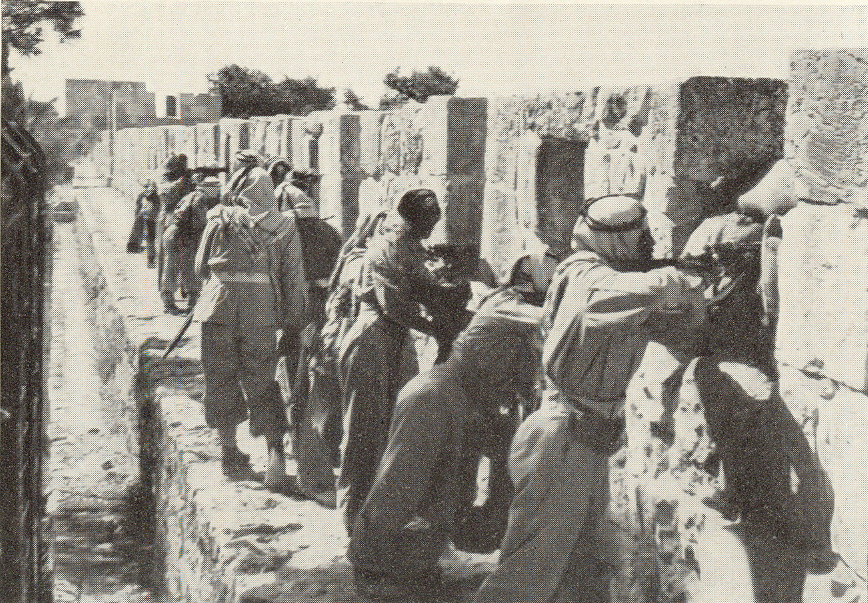
An Arab Legion platoon on the Old City walls

Combat in Jerusalem had begun on 16 May when Arab irregulars attacked the Jewish Quarter of the Old City. Fighting continued into the next day, with the Jewish Quarter's Haganah defenders holding out despite heavy losses, a shortage of ammunition, and the calls of the quarter's rabbis to surrender for fear of a massacre. On 17–18 May, the Haganah launched an assault to break into the Old City which was stopped at the Jaffa Gate, while another attack by the Harel Brigade at the southern wall resulted in the capture of Mount Zion. The Haganah followed up on this with an assault on Zion Gate, which was captured by a Palmach unit. Haganah porters then delivered ammunition and extra weapons to the Jewish Quarter, but the Palmach force, too small to comfortably hold the Zion Gate and alley to the Old City, subsequently retreated.

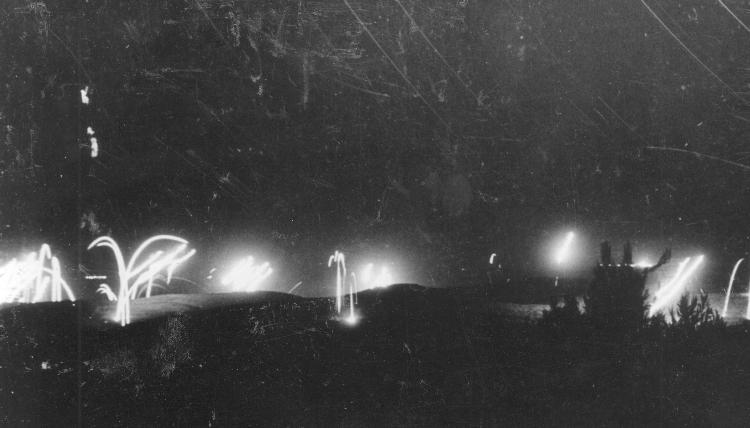
Bombardment of Latrun during Operation Yoram

On 19 May, Arab Legion forces advanced to Jerusalem from Ramallah and entered the city. Irgun fighters resisted their advance at Sheikh Jarrah and the Police School and were defeated, losing 6 dead and 15 wounded. The Arab Legion advanced to the Damascus Gate. However, their forces along the Ramallah-Jerusalem road were still enfiladed by Israeli positions. The Legion's main attack at Mandelbaum Gate was beaten back with three armored cars destroyed, and its assaults on Mount Scopus, Sanhedria, and Beit Yisrael were also repulsed. On 20 May, a Legion armored push against Haganah positions at the Notre Dame monastery, located at the northern wall of the Old City, was repelled with the loss of several armored cars. On 22 May, Arab Legion forces again assaulted the Notre Dame monastery. The Legion convoy took fire from Haganah positions as it advanced through the city towards the monastery, which was answered with small arms, mortar, and artillery fire. The attack on the monastery was poorly executed and repulsed with one armored car disabled. On the following day, a better-organized attack was mounted with infantry, armored cars, mortars, and artillery. However, the attack again faltered in the face of fierce resistance, with two armored cars knocked out. One Legion company managed to enter the ground floor of the monastery and engaged in close-quarters fighting but the rest of the force was pinned down by Haganah fire and could not join the company inside, which was ultimately forced to retreat. Combat around the monastery continued for hours before the Arab Legion retreated. The Legion had taken dozens of casualties.

At the southern edge of Jerusalem, kibbutz Ramat Rachel was attacked on 19 May by a mixed force composed of Arab Legion units, local Arab irregulars, and the force of Egyptian soldiers and Muslim Brotherhood volunteers that had advanced from the Negev after splitting off from the main Egyptian force. After three days of bombardment which almost leveled the kibbutz, an infantry assault on 22 May captured it and the defenders retreated. Haganah forces returned and the kibbutz repeatedly changed hands before the final battle began on 24 May, when Haganah and Irgun forces fiercely held out for two days before counterattacking, driving the Arab forces out and conquering the nearby Mar Elias Monastery. The Arab force lost over 100 killed in the fighting while the Israelis lost 26 killed and 84 wounded. The Israeli victory at Ramat Rachel secured the southern entrance to the city.

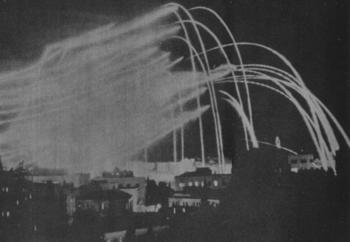
Jordanian artillery shelling Jerusalem in 1948

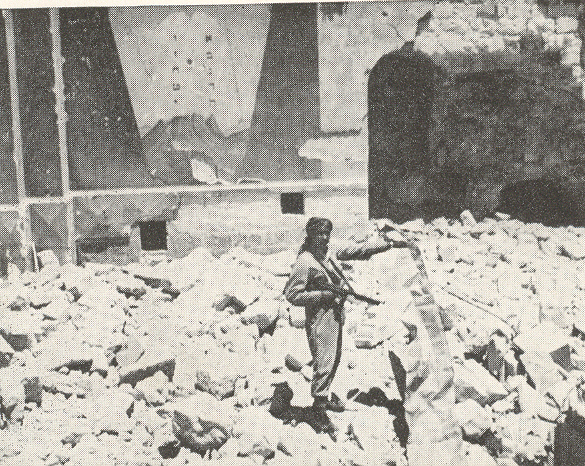
Arab Legion soldier standing in ruins of the most sacred Synagogue, the "Hurva", Old City.

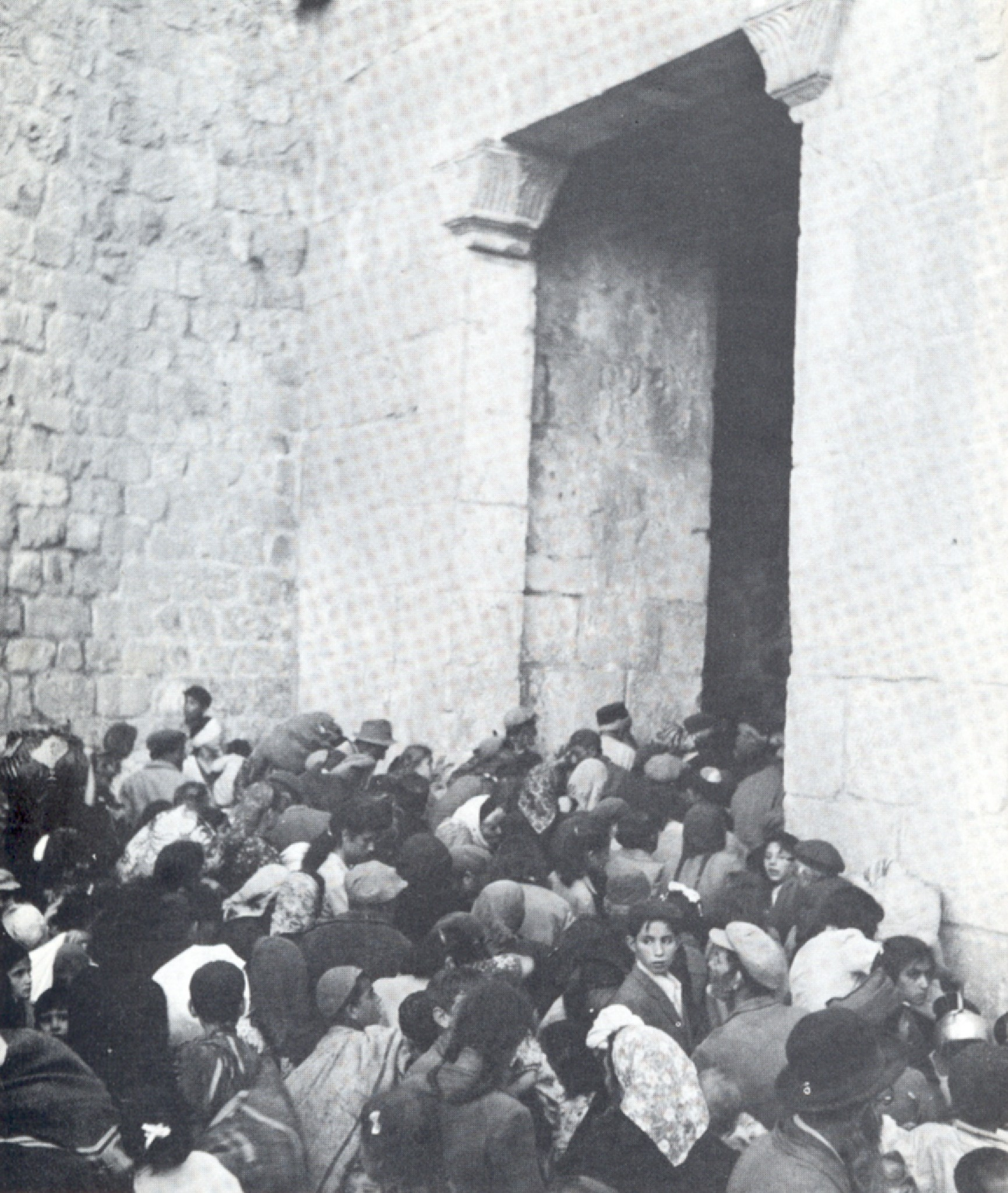
Jewish residents of Jerusalem fleeing during the battle for the Old City

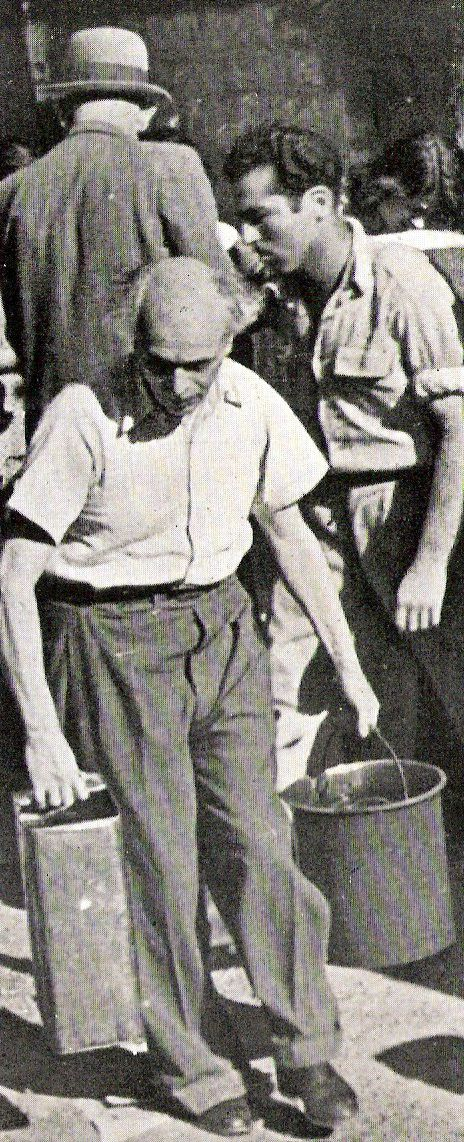
Mathematics professor Michael Fekete, the Provost of the Hebrew University of Jerusalem, with his water quota during the siege of Jerusalem

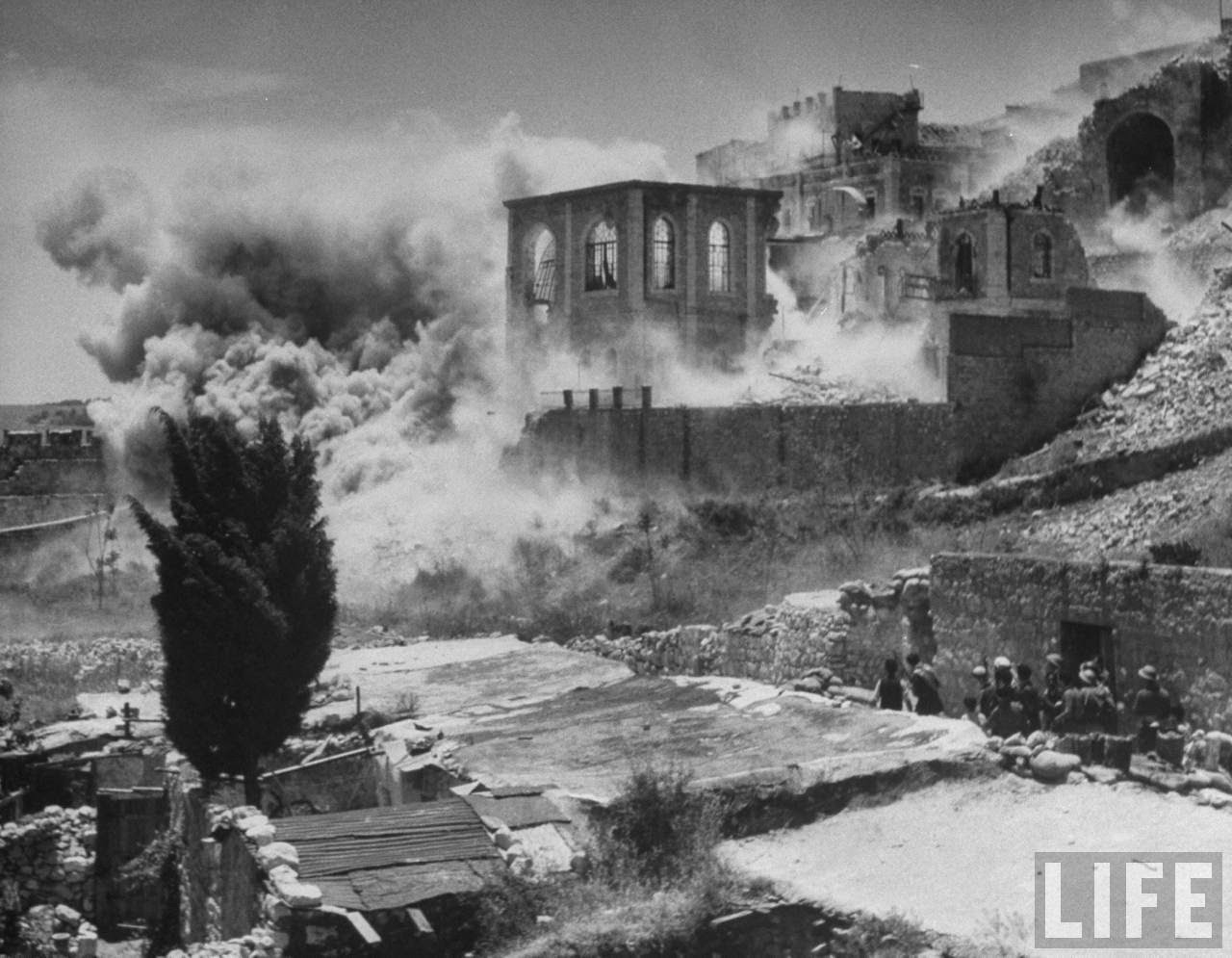
Destruction of the Porat Yosef Yeshiva in the Old City

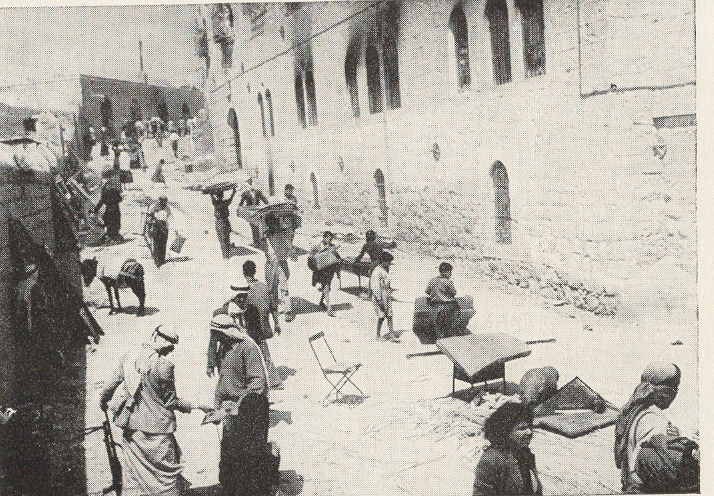
Arabs plundering the Jewish Quarter after the expulsion of its inhabitants

The Arab Legion also occupied the Zion Gate on 19 May following the Haganah retreat from the area, cutting off the Jewish Quarter again, and the assault on the quarter resumed, this time by the Legion together with Arab irregulars, about half of whom were from the Arab Liberation Army. The attack was supported by artillery, mortars, and armored cars, and Legion soldiers methodically blew up every building they took. The defenders were outnumbered and outgunned. The Harel Brigade launched poorly planned and undermanned attacks to try to break into the Jewish Quarter which were beaten back. Jewish morale plummeted after the Hurva Synagogue was captured and blown up. On 28 May, the Jewish Quarter surrendered. Of the defenders, 39 had been killed and 134 wounded. The inhabitants were expelled, with 1,200 being escorted to Israeli-held West Jerusalem alongside some seriously wounded defenders, while 290 males, two-thirds of whom were civilians, were taken prisoner. The Jews had to be escorted out by the Arab Legion to protect them against Palestinian Arab mobs that intended to massacre them. Legion soldiers killed at least two Arab civilians while guarding the Jews. The Jewish Quarter was subsequently pillaged and razed by an Arab mob. According to the official Jordanian military account, the Arab Legion lost 14 killed and 25 wounded in fighting for the Old City.

Simultaneously, the Arab Legion moved to cut off the Jerusalem-Tel Aviv road. Glubb felt that in order to hold onto East Jerusalem he had to prevent the Israelis, who had many more troops, from reinforcing their units in Jerusalem. The strategic hilltop of Latrun, which had a Tegart fort, was deemed the ideal location. Arab Legion forces firmly occupied Latrun on 18 May and held the area together with local Arab irregulars. From the high ground they were able to shell Israeli traffic along the road to Tel Aviv. As a result, Israeli-held West Jerusalem was effectively placed under siege. Supplies to Israeli fighters and civilians in Jerusalem were cut off. Though some supplies, mostly munitions, were airdropped into the city, the shortage of food, water, fuel, medicine, and ammunition in West Jerusalem was acute.

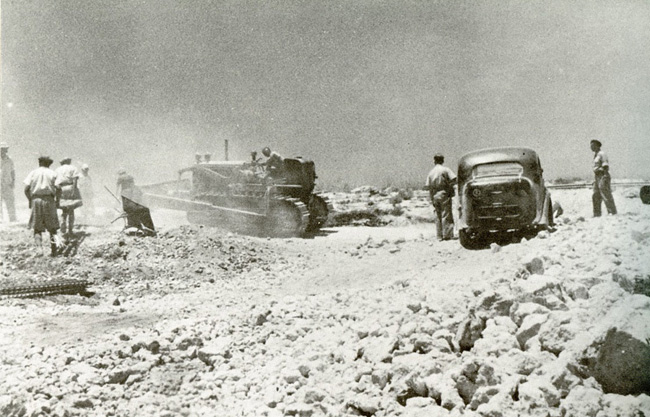
Building the Burma Road

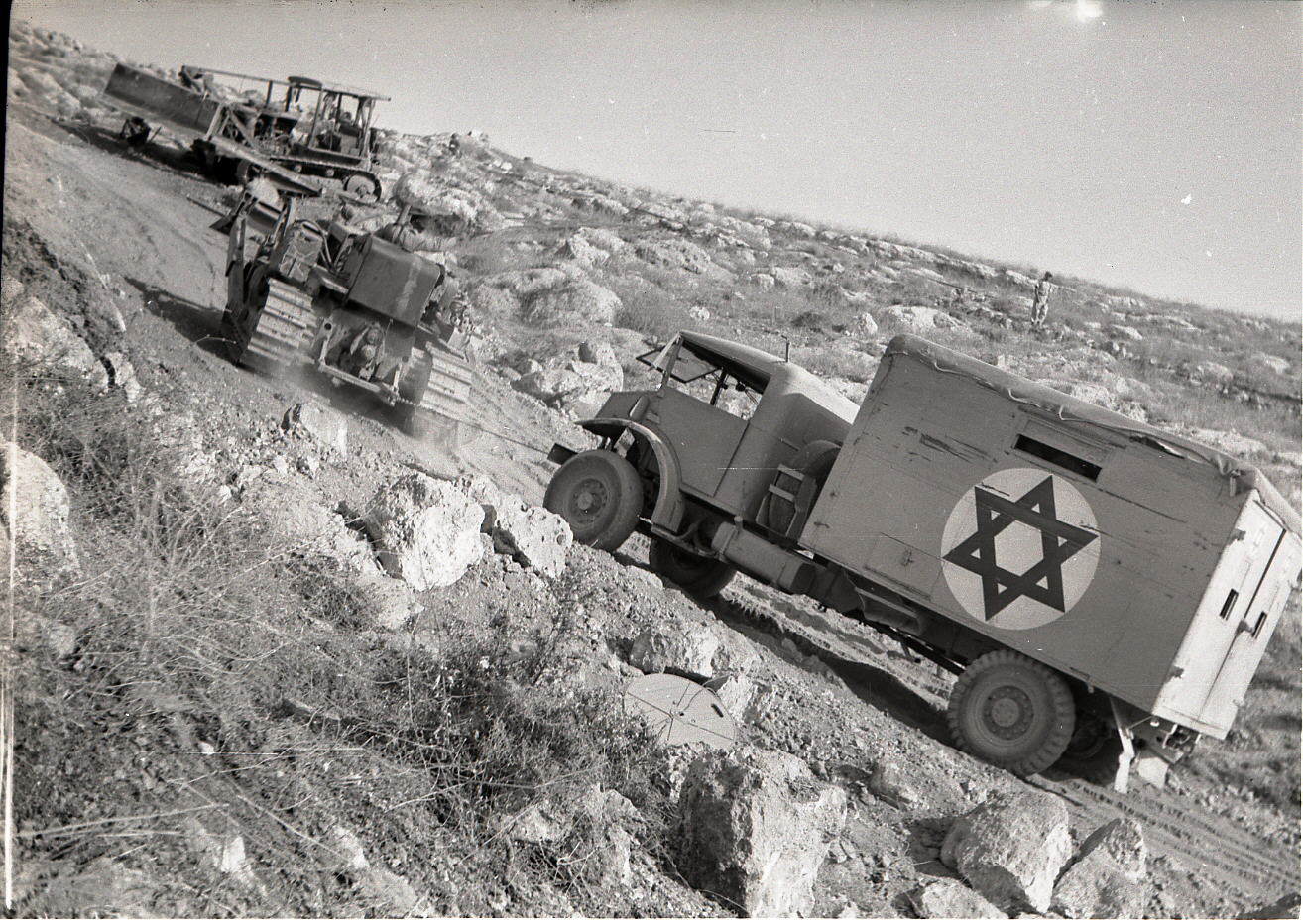
A bulldozer tows an ambulance on the Burma Road, June 1948

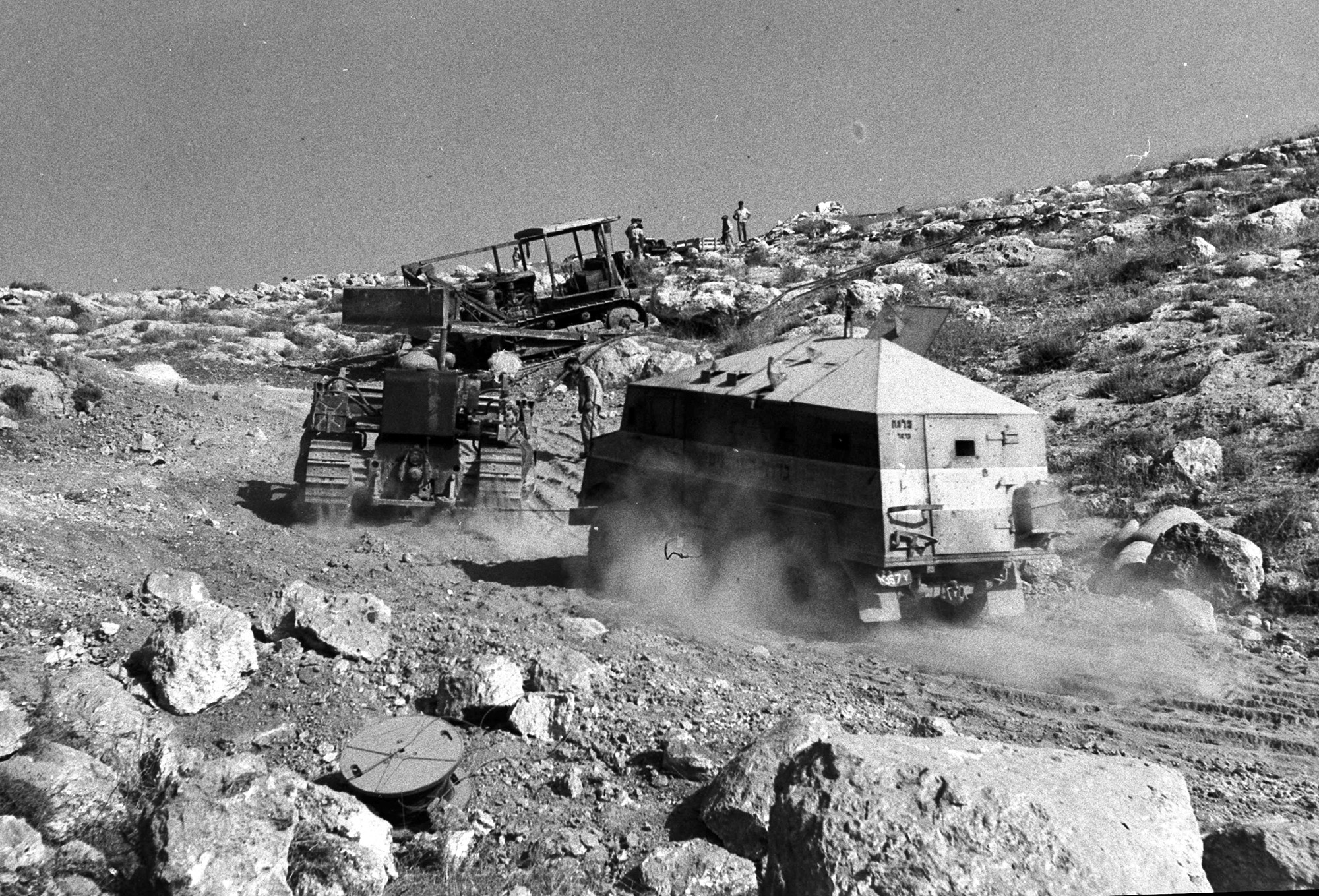
Vehicles on the Burma Road

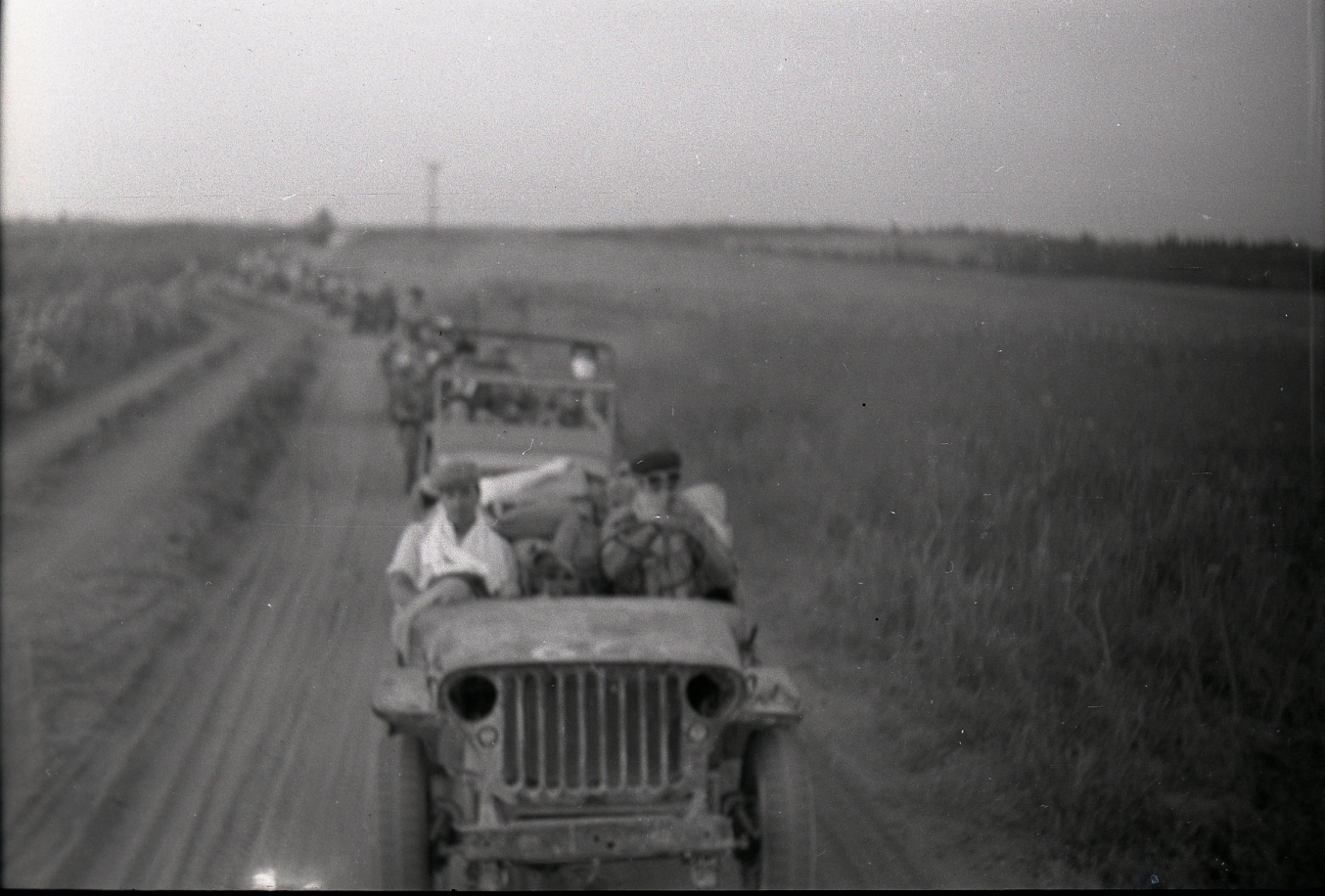
Jeeps on the Burma Road

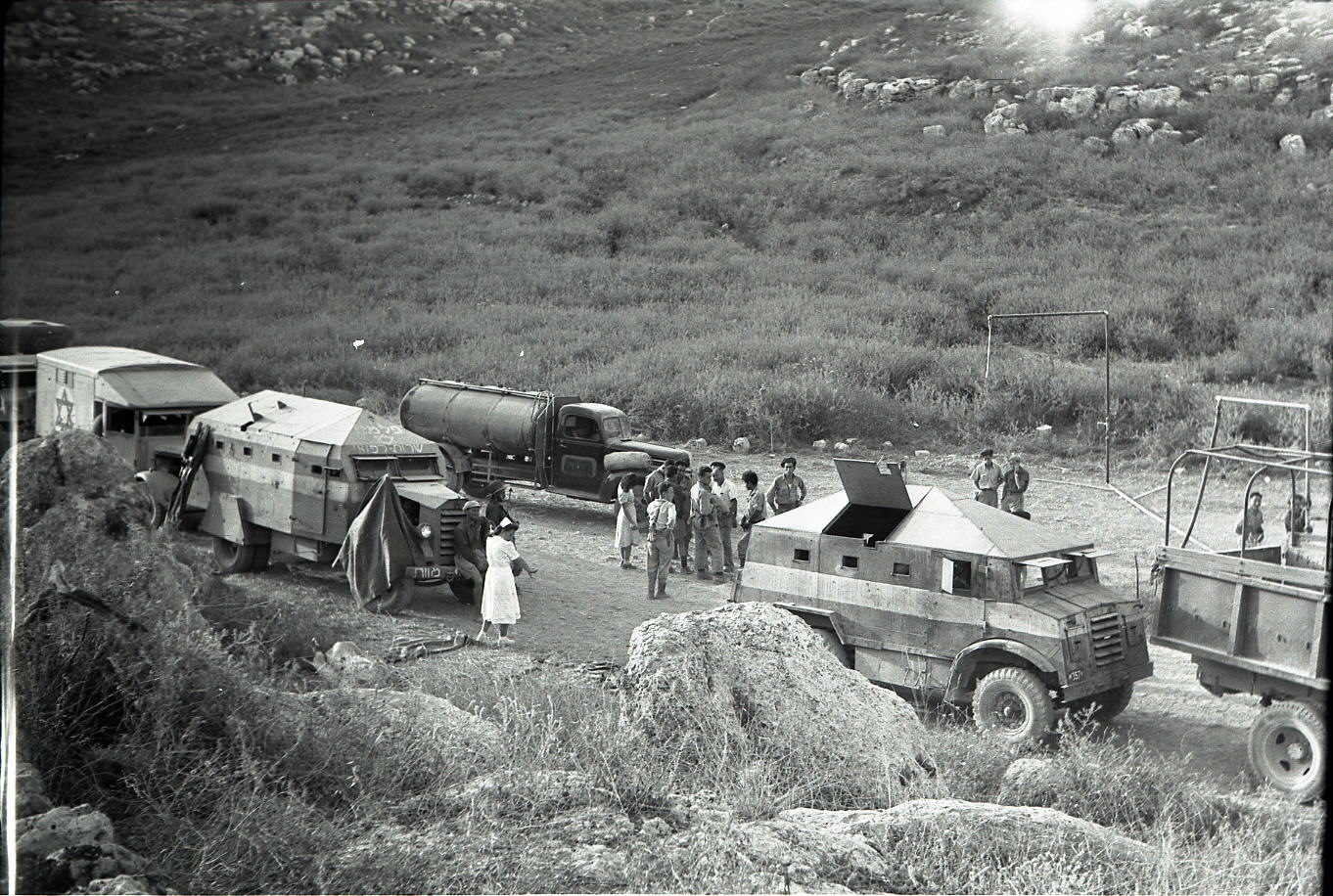
A convoy on the Burma Road

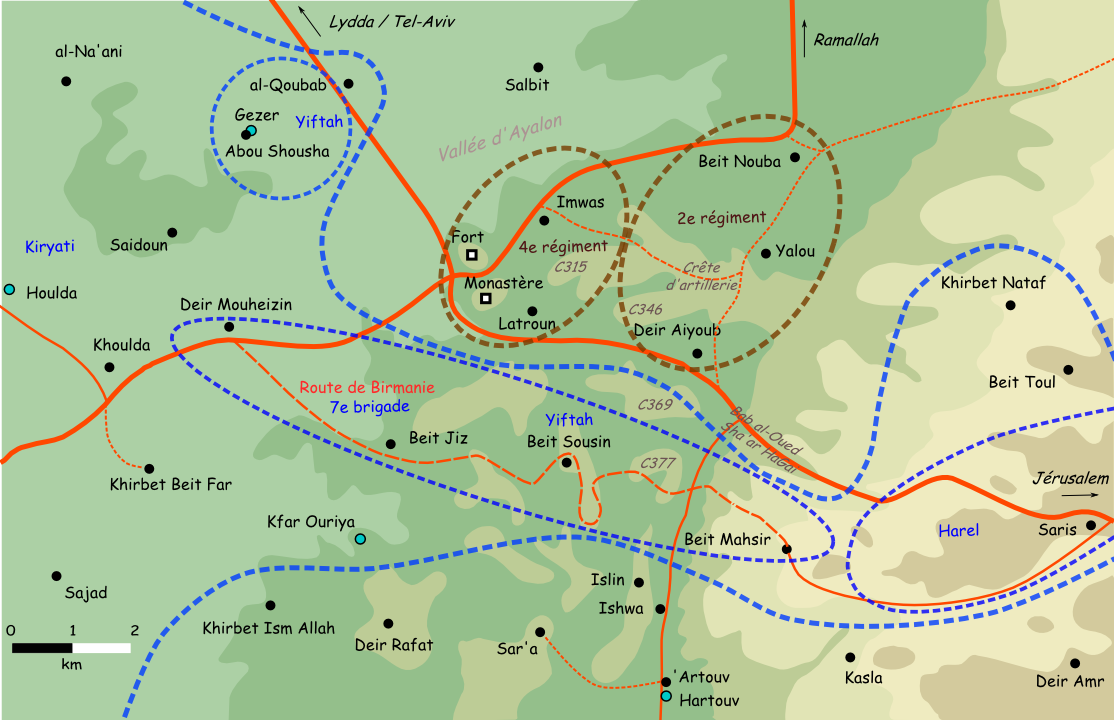
Area map

The Israelis attempted to take the Latrun fortress in a series of battles lasting from 24 May to 18 July. The Arab Legion held Latrun and managed to repulse the attacks. The first attack, dubbed Operation Bin-Nun Alef, was a disastrous failure. The attack was decisively repelled with the Israelis losing 72 killed, 140 wounded, and 6 captured while the Arab Legion and Arab irregulars lost 5 killed and 6 wounded. They tried again with Operation Bin-Nun Bet on 30–31 May. This attack met more success, with the Israelis managing to capture the monastery and half the village on the hill and reaching the perimeter of the fort, with some soldiers even breaching into the fort before being killed inside, but in the end the Israelis retreated. The attack cost the Israelis 44 killed while the Arab Legion lost between 12 and 20 killed, with the fort's commander among the dead. Israeli forces made one more attempt to capture Latrun before the first truce with Operation Yoram, an attack by two battalions on the night of 8–9 June. The attack made some progress and managed to cause a partial retreat of the Arab Legion but due to confusion, approaching daylight, and reports of heavy casualties, the attackers were ordered to retreat. One of the Israeli battalions lost 16 killed and 79 wounded while the other had a handful of casualties. The Arab Legion suffered several dozen casualties.

On 10 June, a day before the first truce came into effect, a battalion-sized force of Arab Legion soldiers and Arab irregulars equipped with armored cars attacked kibbutz Gezer and captured it after a battle in which 29 of the kibbutz's defenders and 2 Legion soldiers were killed. IDF forces in the area failed to reinforce the kibbutz due to poor communications. After the Legion withdrew the kibbutz was reoccupied by Israeli forces in the evening.

The besieged Israeli-held West Jerusalem was only saved via the opening of the so-called "Burma Road", a makeshift bypass road built by Israeli forces that allowed Israeli supply convoys to pass into Jerusalem. Palmach scouts had noticed the potential for an alternate route bypassing Latrun. After the Haganah took Bayt Jiz and Bayt Susin on 28 May it had a continuous route from Tel Aviv to Jerusalem, and engineering works to build a road subsequently began. The Arab Legion attempted to disrupt the works with artillery fire and harassment by patrols, but was unsuccessful. A new water pipeline was also laid to replace the one blocked by the Legion at Latrun. On 10 June, the road opened and transport trucks were able to access West Jerusalem, bringing in supplies.

==== Northern Samaria ====
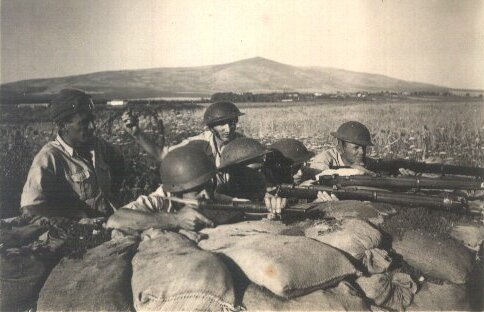
Israeli soldiers in Afula

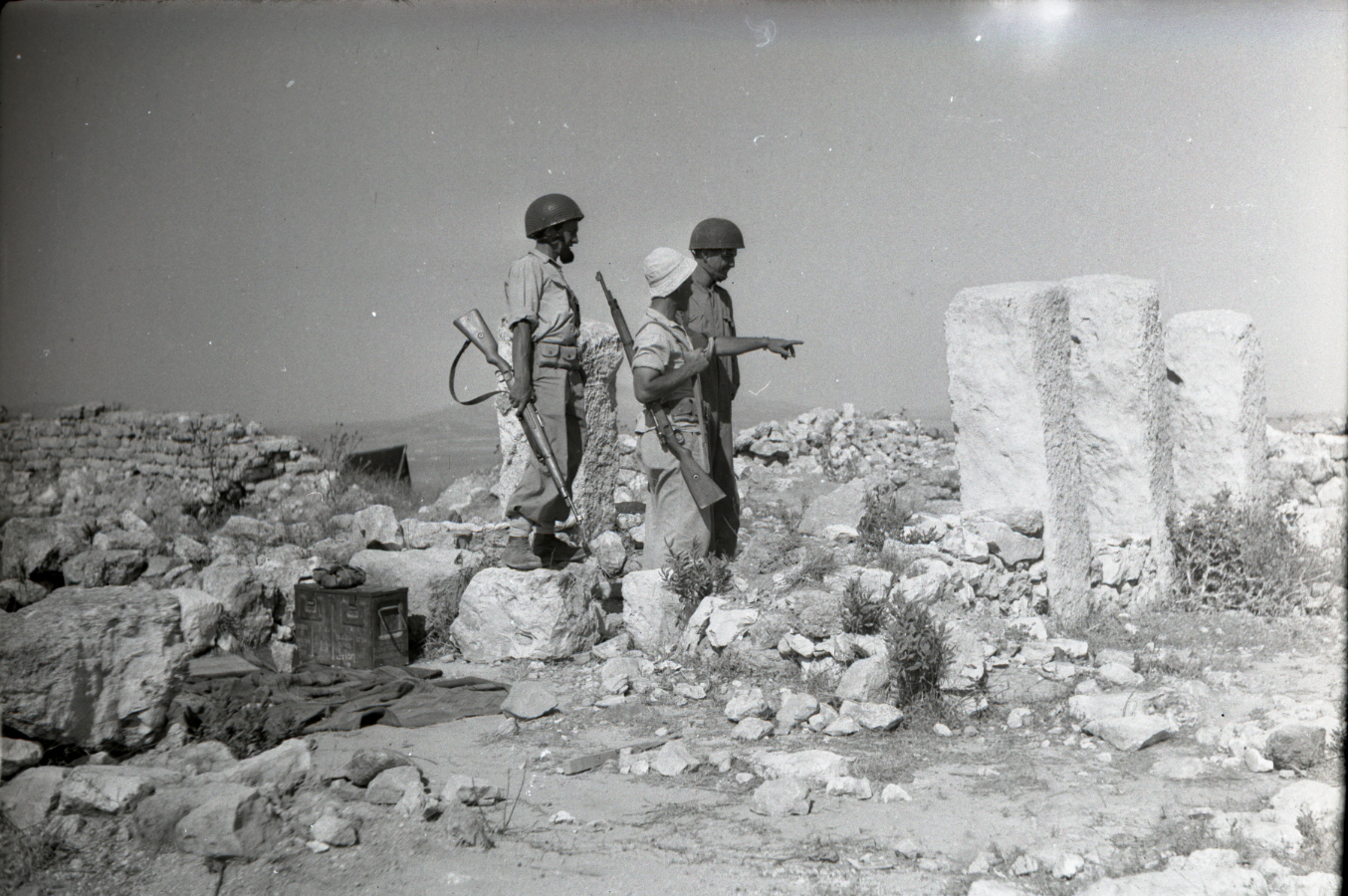
Israeli soldiers in the Mount Gilboa area

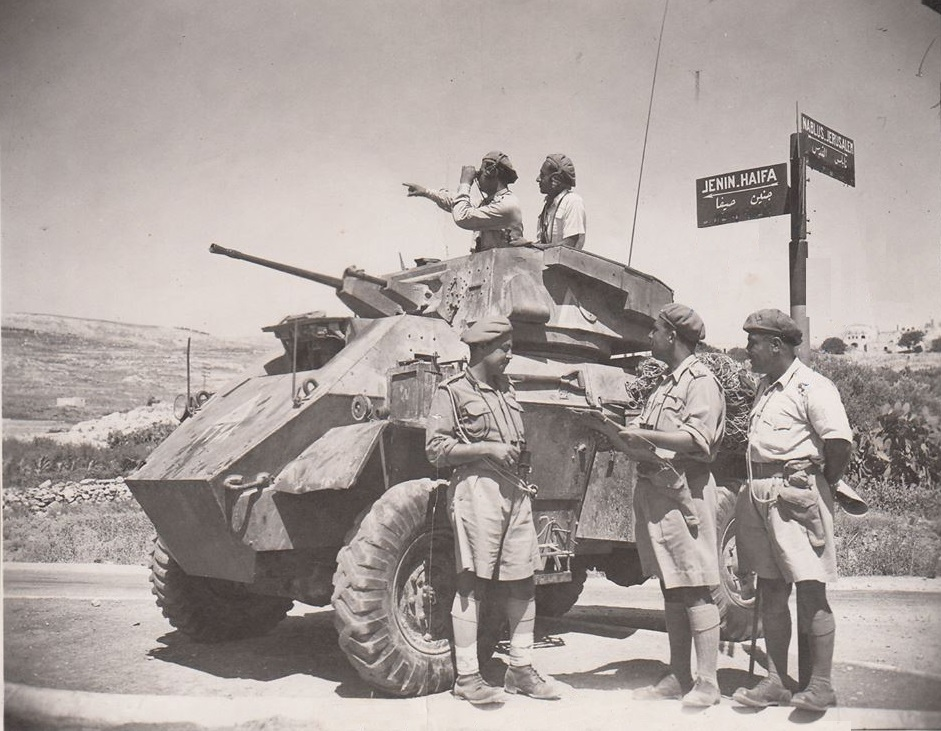
Iraqi soldiers and an armored car near Jenin

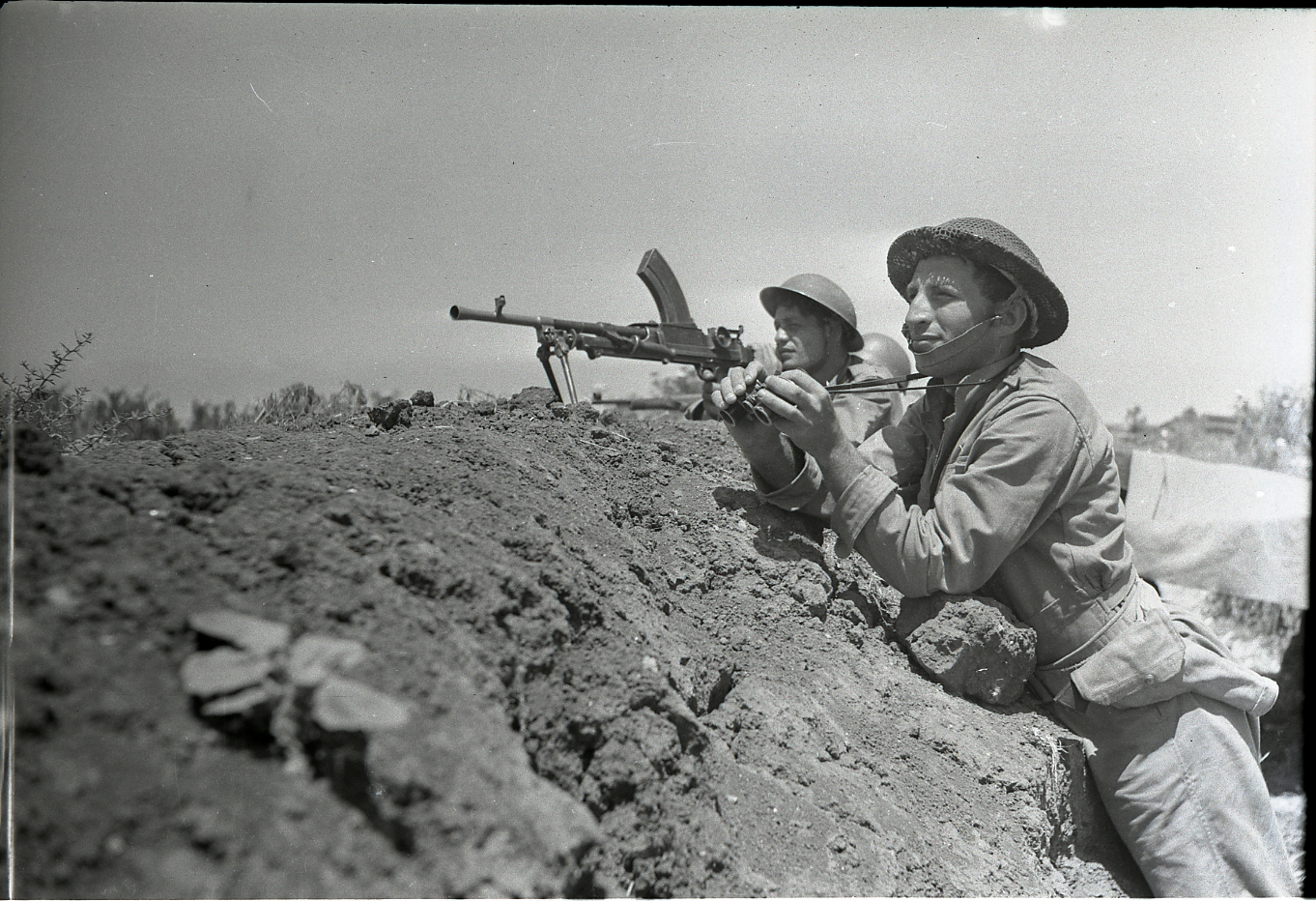
Israeli soldiers at Qaqun

An Iraqi brigade group consisting of two infantry battalions, one armored car battalion, and one artillery battalion was sent to Mafraq in northern Transjordan in late April to prepare for action in Palestine, and crossed the Jordan River on 15 May. The Iraqis attacked kibbutz Gesher beginning with an artillery barrage. On 16 May, the Iraqis captured nearby Camel Hill and launched assaults on the kibbutz and a nearby police fort. The defenders, who received air support from Piper Cubs, repulsed the attacks, inflicting heavy losses. On the following day, the Iraqis renewed their assaults and were again repulsed, with numerous Iraqi armored cars that managed to break into the fort's courtyard put out of action by molotov cocktails. The Iraqis then laid siege to the kibbutz for five days. Israeli counterattacks against the Iraqis on Camel Hill were unsuccessful. After another Iraqi assault failed, the Iraqis attempted to take a nearby hill to the west dominated by Belvoir Castle but were beaten back by Israeli troops of the Golani Brigade dug in at the top who received artillery support from two Napoleonchik 65mm cannons that had been decisively used against the Syrians several miles to the north days before. Following this defeat, Iraqi forces retreated and moved into the strategic triangle in Samaria bounded by the Arab towns Nablus, Jenin and Tulkarm.

Iraqi forces in northern Samaria were largely inactive until Glubb requested that they take action to ease pressure on the Arab Legion at Latrun. On 28 May the Iraqis attacked and took part of moshav Geulim, near Netanya. Israeli troops of the Alexandroni Brigade counterattacked and drove them out. For the next three days Iraqi forces were periodically attacked by Israeli aircraft. The Iraqis subsequently captured a water pumping station between Geulim and Lydda but otherwise made no further offensive action. The Israelis decided to follow up their successes in repulsing the Iraqi attacks with an offensive against Iraqi forces in Samaria. From 28 to 30 May Golani Brigade units advanced south from the Jezreel Valley and captured numerous Arab villages defended only by local militiamen in the Mount Gilboa area, paving the way for an assault on Jenin. The IDF subsequently assaulted Jenin on 31 May and heavy fighting ensued. The Iraqi forces and local irregulars managed to hold out until Iraqi reinforcements arrived from Nablus. They also received air support. The Israelis retreated on 4 June. The IDF lost 34 killed and over 100 wounded in the fighting for Jenin and claimed to have killed some 200 Iraqi soldiers and Arab irregulars. Historian Pesach Malovany wrote that the Israeli figure for Arab casualties was "somewhat exaggerated" and cited Iraqi losses as 27 killed, while a count of Iraqi graves in a local cemetery suggests a figure of 44 Iraqi soldiers killed.

On 4 June, the IDF launched an attack against Qaqun, northwest of Tulkarm. Elements of the Alexandroni Brigade conquered the village, engaging local militiamen and Iraqi forces. According to Benny Morris, only a few local militiamen and several dozen Iraqi soldiers were present and they were rapidly overwhelmed by the Israeli assault. He characterized it as a minor Israeli success. According to the Alexandroni Brigade's official history, a nearby Iraqi headquarters was taken in addition to the village, the Israeli soldiers subsequently held out against Iraqi counterattacks with both sides receiving air support, and an entire Iraqi battalion was ultimately wiped out. Pesarch Malovany wrote that after the village's conquest an Iraqi counterattack was repulsed on 5 June. The Alexandroni Brigade lost 16 soldiers in the fighting for Qaqun.

After these battles, the Iraqi forces became stationary. According to Benny Morris, although the IDF had been defeated in fighting at Jenin, that battle along with the conquest of Qaqun convinced the Iraqis to stay in the triangle region, averting the possibility of an Iraqi thrust across Israel's narrow territory in the region to the Mediterranean.

According to Pesach Malovany, additional combat took place in the Kafr Qasim area when an Israeli attack on Iraqi forces in the area forced an Iraqi retreat on the night of 11–12 June, with a subsequent Iraqi counterattack repulsed. Iraqi forces subsequently withdrew from the sector entirely, leading to the IDF taking it over.

==== Northern front – Sea of Galilee ====
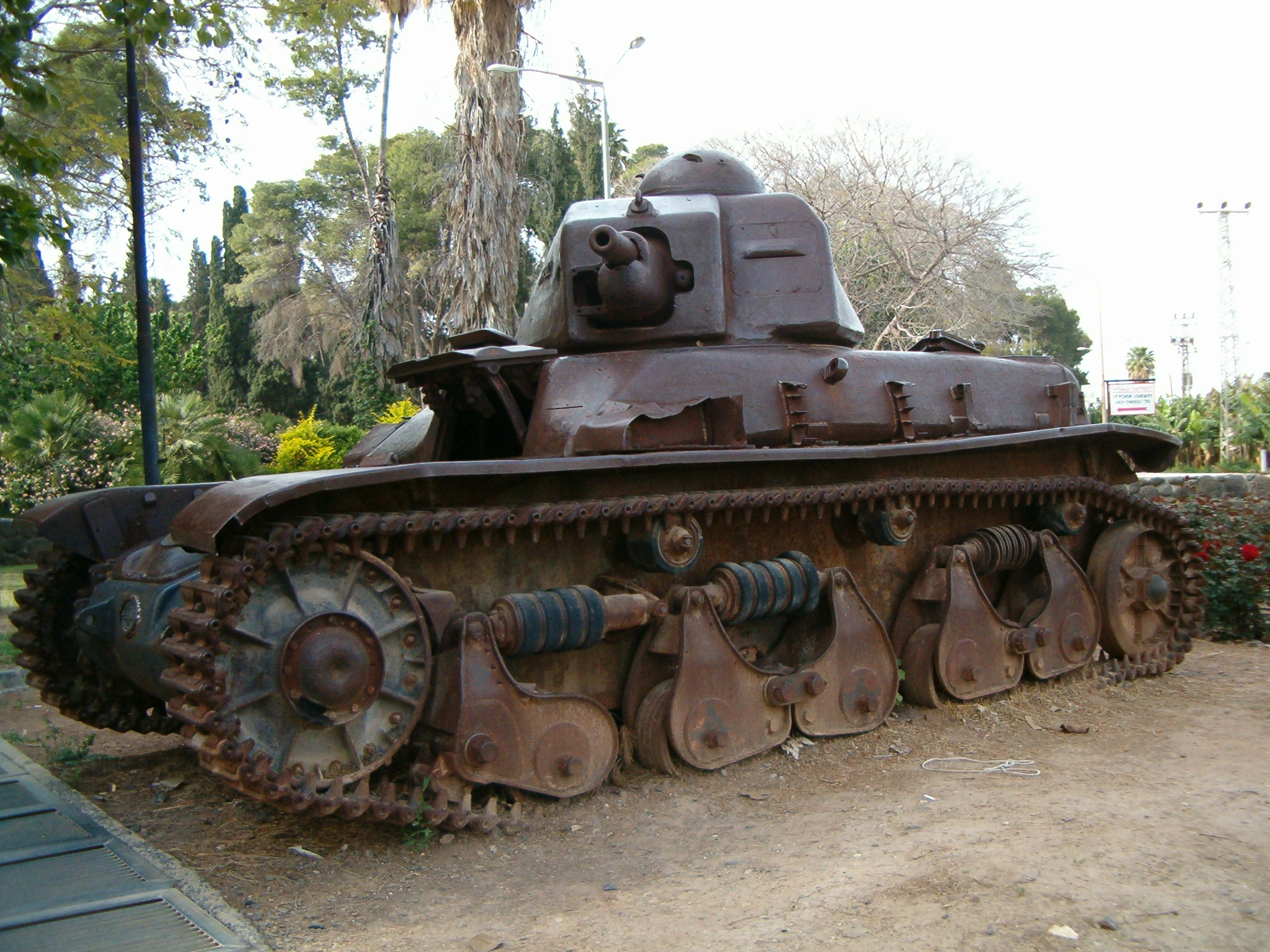
Syrian R-35 light tank knocked out at Degania Alef

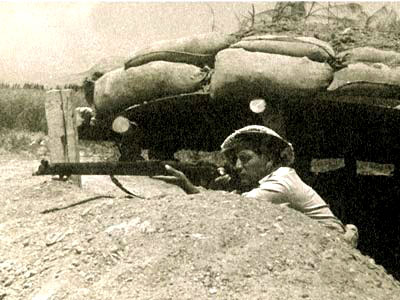
A defender of kibbutz Sha'ar HaGolan at a position overlooking the border

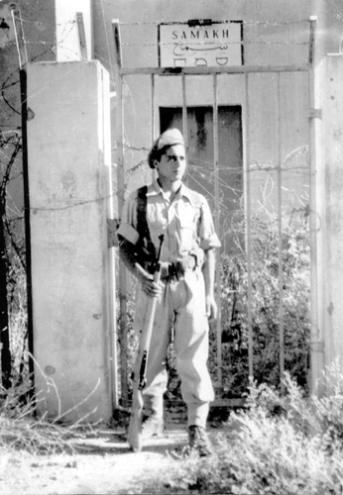
An Israeli soldier at Samakh

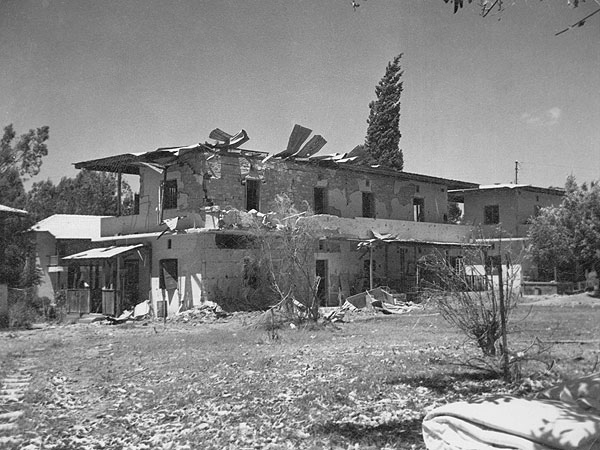
A building in one of the Deganias damaged by Syrian bombardment

Syrian forces entered Palestine on 15 May. The only Syrian Army formation fully ready for action was the 1st Brigade, which had two infantry battalions, an armored battalion consisting of a company of French-built R 35 and R 37 tanks and two armored car companies, and a handful of artillery batteries. The 2nd Brigade was still being organized. It would field two infantry battalions and an armored car battalion. The Israeli forces facing the Syrian invasion initially consisted of the Golani Brigade's 12th Battalion and militia from local kibbutzim, with a company of the Yiftach Brigade and militia platoons from settlements further behind the line arriving as reinforcements in the following days.

In the early hours of 15 May, the Syrian invasion began. The 2nd Brigade advanced to the eastern shore of the Sea of Galilee and attacked kibbutz Ein Gev as a diversion for the main assault conducted by the 1st Brigade. The attack on Ein Gev began with an airstrike by a lone Syrian aircraft which dropped bombs aimed at the kibbutz which missed. Syrian infantry raked the kibbutz with machine gun fire but did not mount a direct ground assault. The 1st Brigade invaded along the southern end of the Sea of Galilee, shelling kibbutzim to their west, and advanced to the lower Jordan Valley. An assault on Sha'ar HaGolan and two assaults on Samakh were repelled. However, the Syrians succeeded in counquering Samakh with a third attack on 18 May. The defenders were shelled by Syrian artillery as they retreated. The members of Sha'ar HaGolan and Masada also fled to Afikim and the abandoned kibbutzim were then looted by local Arabs.

On the night of 18–19 May, an Israeli counterattack to retake Samakh was repelled. On that same night, two Israeli commando raids were launched. In one raid, a platoon from Ein Gev conducted a seaborne landing to the south at Samra and attacked Syrian forces at Tel al-Qasir. The attack was unsuccessful but may have delayed the subsequent Syrian push to Degania Alef and Degania Bet, giving the Israelis more time to prepare. In the second raid, a company crossed the Jordan River and attacked a Syrian camp near the B'not Ya'akov Bridge north of the Sea of Galilee. The Syrians retreated after a brief firefight and the Israelis destroyed the camp and a number of vehicles without taking losses.

By 19 May, Israeli morale had plummeted. The Haganah sent reinforcements and chief of operations Yigael Yadin ordered that the defenders should fight for every position with no voluntary abandonment. Four Napoleonchik 65mm mountain guns were sent to provide artillery support. Prime Minister Ben-Gurion had initially wanted to send them to the Jerusalem front but after an argument with Yadin backed down and agreed to have them sent to the north. On 20 May, the Syrians assaulted Degania Alef and Degania Bet. The two kibbutzim were defended by local militiamen reinforced by elements of the Carmeli Brigade. The defenders were supported by three 20mm guns at Beit Yerah, four 81mm mortars of which were positioned at Kvutzat Kinneret and one at Degania Alef, and a Davidka mortar at Degania Alef. Each kibbutz also had a PIAT with fifteen rounds. The defenders were ordered to fight to the death and not retreat.

The Syrians began their attacks with a half-hour artillery barrage on both kibbutzim, followed by an advance on Degania Alef by Syrian infantry and armor setting out from the police fort near Samakh. The attack was decisively repelled. The Syrian infantry were pinned down by Israeli fire while the Syrian armor retreated after numerous tanks and armored cars were hit by 20mm cannon and PIAT fire as well as grenades and molotov cocktails. The Syrians followed up with an attack on Degania Bet, which was also stopped by fierce resistance. However, the Syrians remained dug in beyond the perimeter fences of both kibbutzim and proceeded to harass them with cannon and small arms fire. The stalemate was broken the following day when the four Napoleonchik mountain guns arrived and were positioned on the heights of Alumot, overlooking the area. The Israelis used them to conduct an artillery barrage against the Syrian headquarters at Samakh and Syrian infantry and armor between Samakh and the two kibbutzim – Israel's first use of artillery in the war. The barrage surprised the Syrians and caused them to retreat to Tel al-Qasir, abandoning Samakh, Masada, and Sha'ar HaGolan along the way.

The defeat was considered to be decisive. Based on these battles, British observers concluded that the Arabs would not win the war. The Syrian Defense Minister and Chief of Staff as well as the commanders of the 1st and 2nd Brigades resigned within days. One author claims that the main reason for the Syrian defeat was the Syrian soldiers' low regard for the Israelis who they believed would not stand and fight. The Syrians claimed that their defeat was due to unpreparedness, the quality of Israeli fortifications, and a lack of coordination between various Syrian units as well between the Syrian and Iraqi armies.

On 6 June, Syrian forces attacked Mishmar HaYarden, but were repulsed. On 10 June, the Syrians overran Mishmar HaYarden in house-to-house fighting and advanced to the main road, where they were stopped by units of the Oded Brigade. Subsequently, the Syrians reverted to a defensive posture, conducting only a few minor attacks on small, exposed Israeli settlements.

==== Galilee Panhandle ====
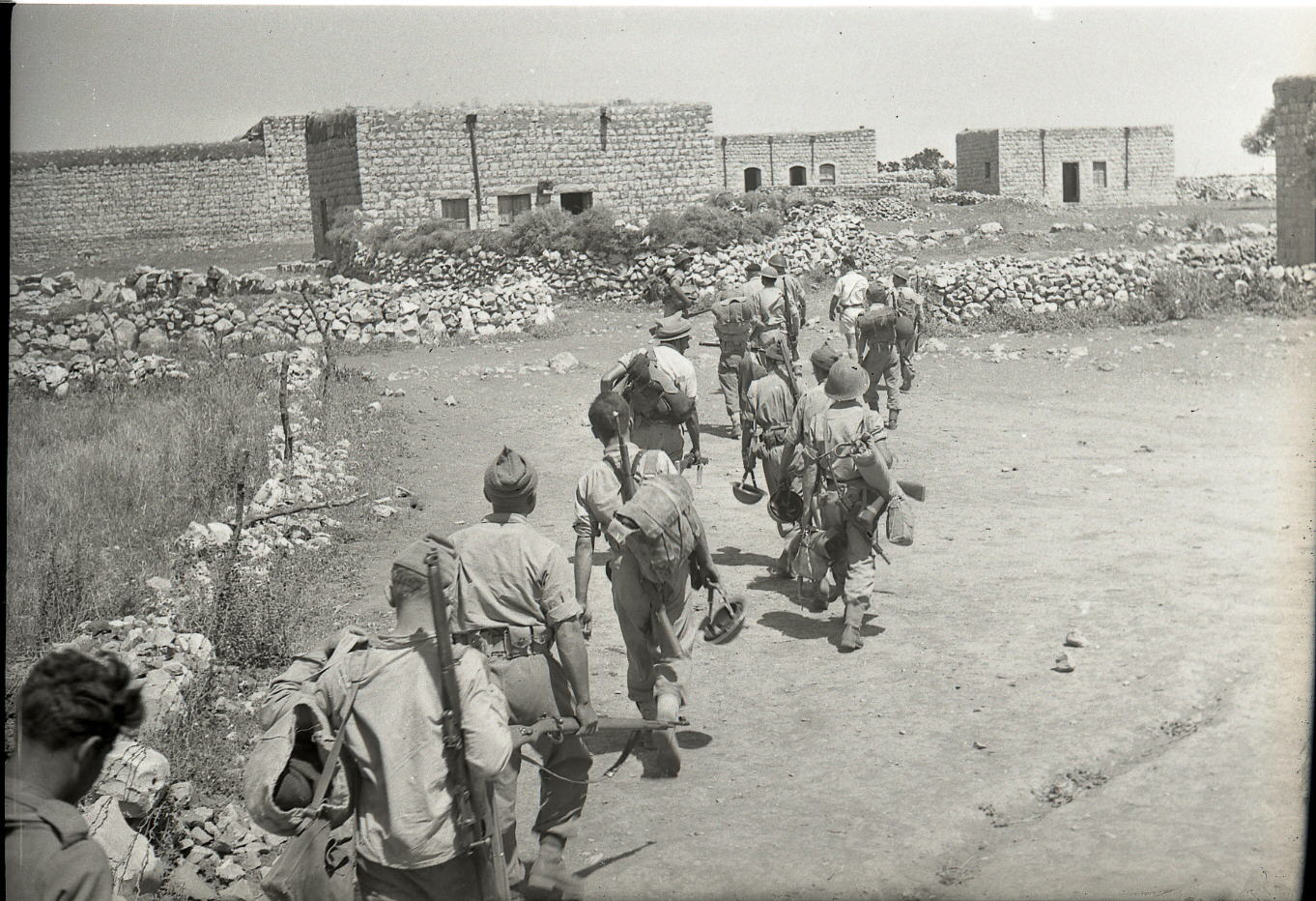
Israeli soldiers in Al-Malkiyya

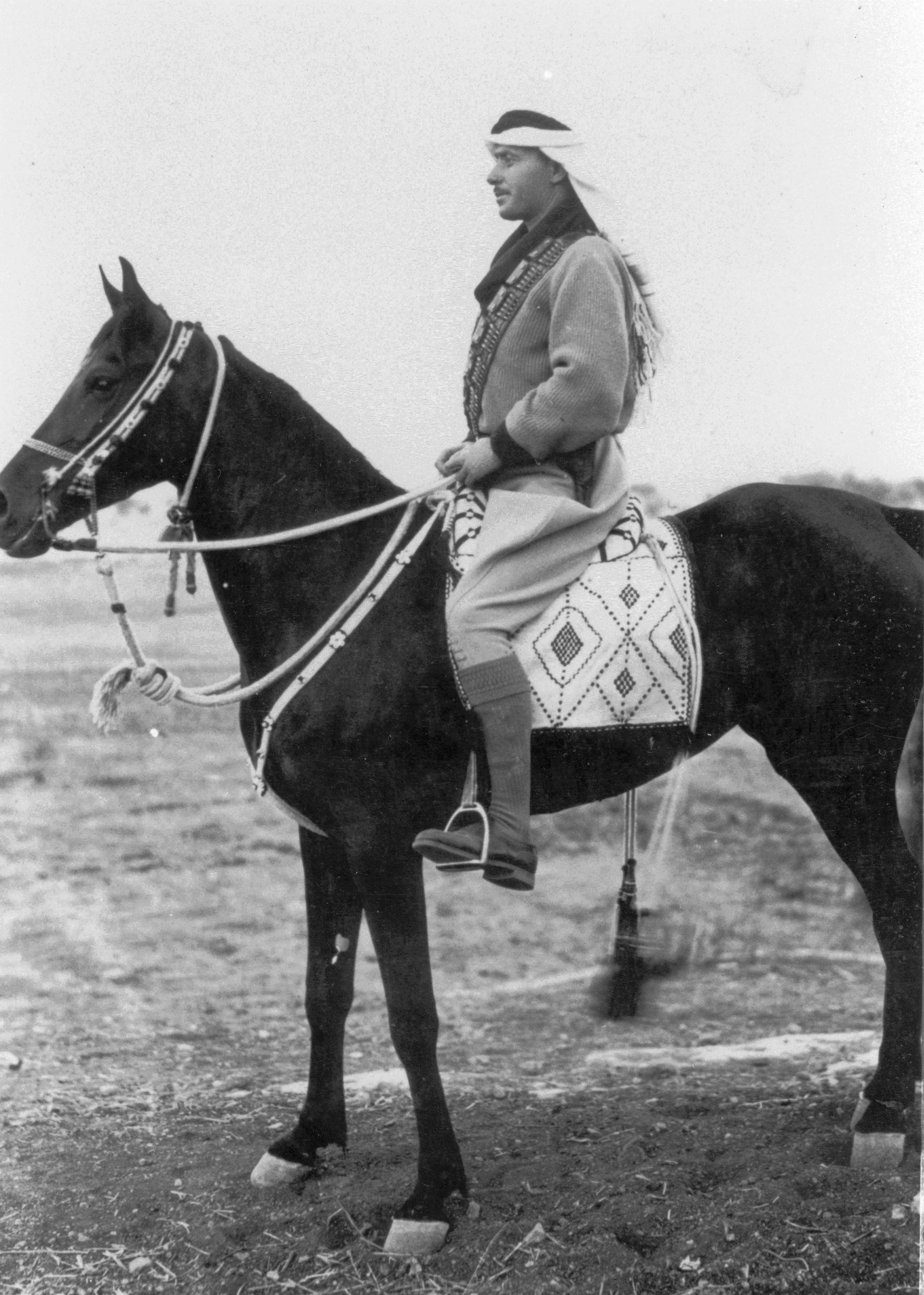
Fawzi al-Qawukji, the Arab Liberation Army commander

The Galilee Panhandle, which was bordered by Lebanon to the west and north and Syria to the east, was to be invaded by the Lebanese Army according to the Arab League invasion plan, which called for a Lebanese push to Acre and Haifa. The Lebanese Army at the time consisted of four infantry battalions, two artillery batteries, and an armored battalion equipped with light tanks and armored cars. However, the planned invasion was called off at shortly before it was to go ahead largely due to domestic political consideration, as well as the recognition that the Lebanese Army was ill-prepared for war and that entering the war could result in an Israeli conquest of southern Lebanon. In addition, the Haganah had also captured the route the Lebanese war plan had designated for use in the invasion in Operation Ben-Ami just before the end of the Mandate. However, in order to maintain its reputation in the Arab world, Lebanon agreed to facilitate an invasion by the Arab Liberation Army and provide it with artillery cover, armored cars, personnel, and logistical support. The ALA force that entered Palestine from Lebanon was the 2nd Yarmuk Battalion, which consisted of several hundred Iraqi, Syrian, Lebanese, and Yugoslav volunteers. Israel had the Yiftach Brigade stationed in the area to defend it.

On 15 May, the 2nd Yarmuk Battalion crossed the border and pushed to the abandoned village of Al-Malkiyya and the surrounding area. The area was defended by the Yiftach Brigade's 1st Battalion and fighting commenced in and around the village. The ALA fighters received artillery support and were reinforced by a company of Jordanian Bedouin volunteers, and the Haganah ultimately ended up retreating by nightfall. The Israelis had taken around 150 casualties. Although victorious, the ALA had also taken serious casualties and decided to dig in at Al-Malkiyya and the nearby village of Qadas rather than advance further. On the night of 15–16 May, a bridge over the Litani River six miles into Lebanon was destroyed in an Israeli commando raid, which reduced Lebanon's ability to supply the ALA forces. On the night of 28–29 May, the Yiftach Brigade counterattacked and retook Al-Malkiyya and the cost of 2 killed and 3 wounded. On 5–6 June, the 3rd Battalion of the Lebanese Army, together with ALA fighters and a Syrian battalion, recaptured Al-Malkiyya and Qadas in what became the only intervention of the Lebanese Army during the war, handing the towns over to the ALA and withdrawing on 8 July.

==== Haifa area ====
On the night 22–23 May, the 33rd Battalion of the Haganah's Alexandroni Brigade attacked the Palestinian Arab village of Tantura, which was part of an Arab enclave south of Haifa. The attack began with heavy machine gun fire followed by an infantry assault from all landward sides as an Israeli naval vessel blocked off the village from the sea. The villagers put up fierce resistance but Tantura was conquered on 23 May. Subsequently, Israeli troops killed a number of villagers in what became known as the Tantura massacre, although the number of those killed is disputed.

==== Air operations ====
An Egyptian Spitfire shot down over Tel Aviv on 15 May 1948

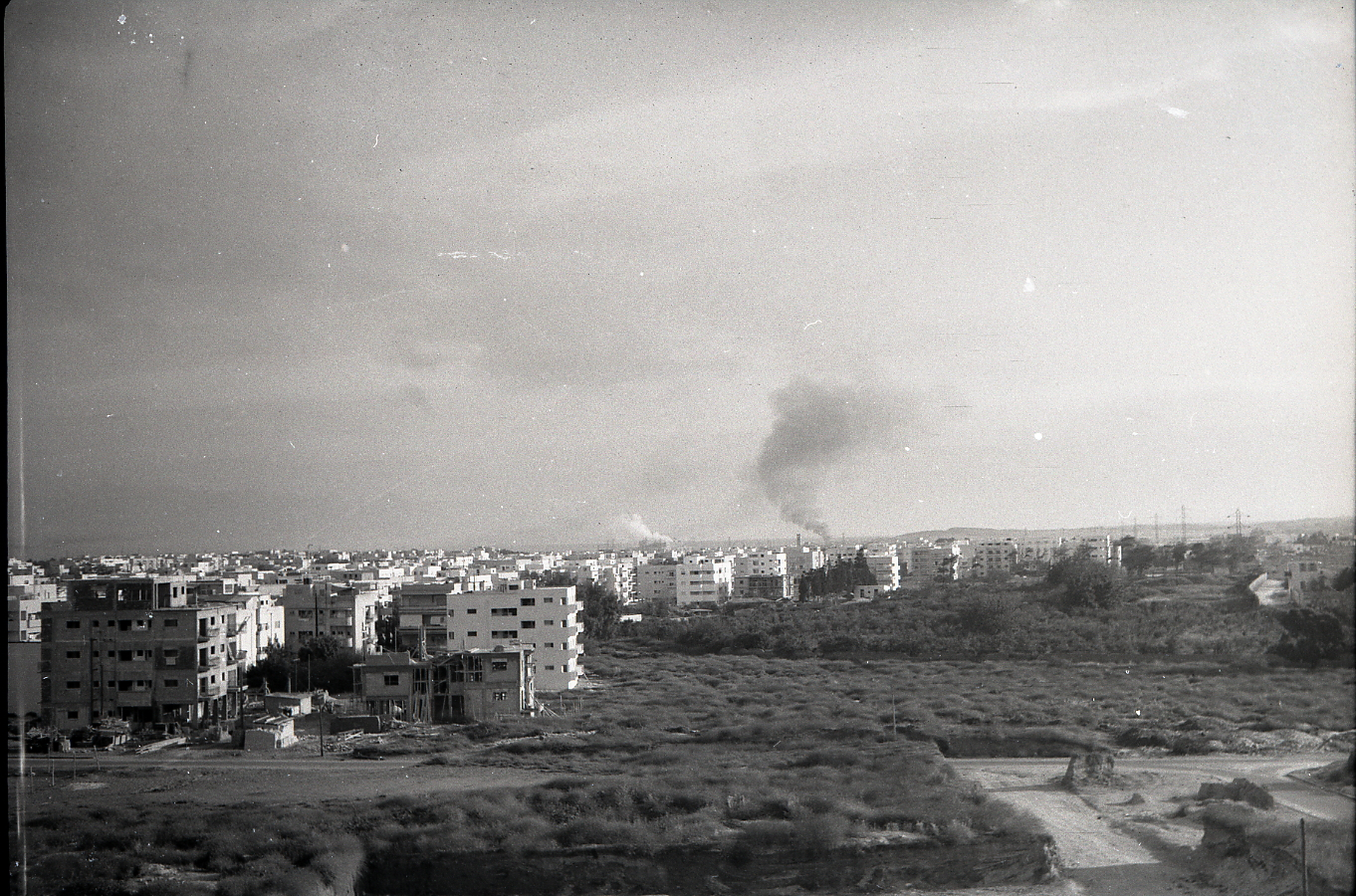
The Egyptian bombing of Tel Aviv on 15 May 1948

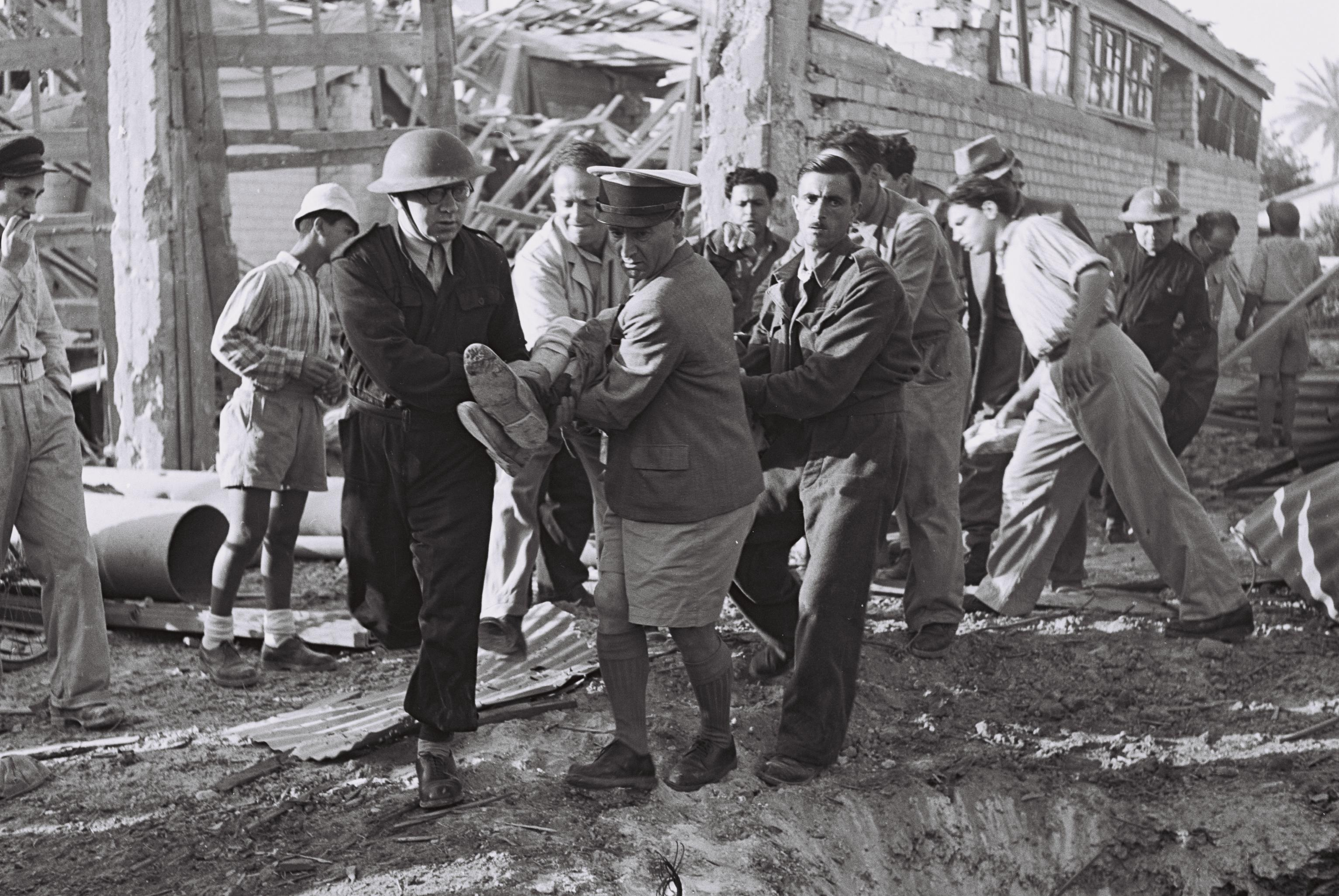
Volunteers evacuating a wounded man in the aftermath of an Egyptian attack on Tel Aviv

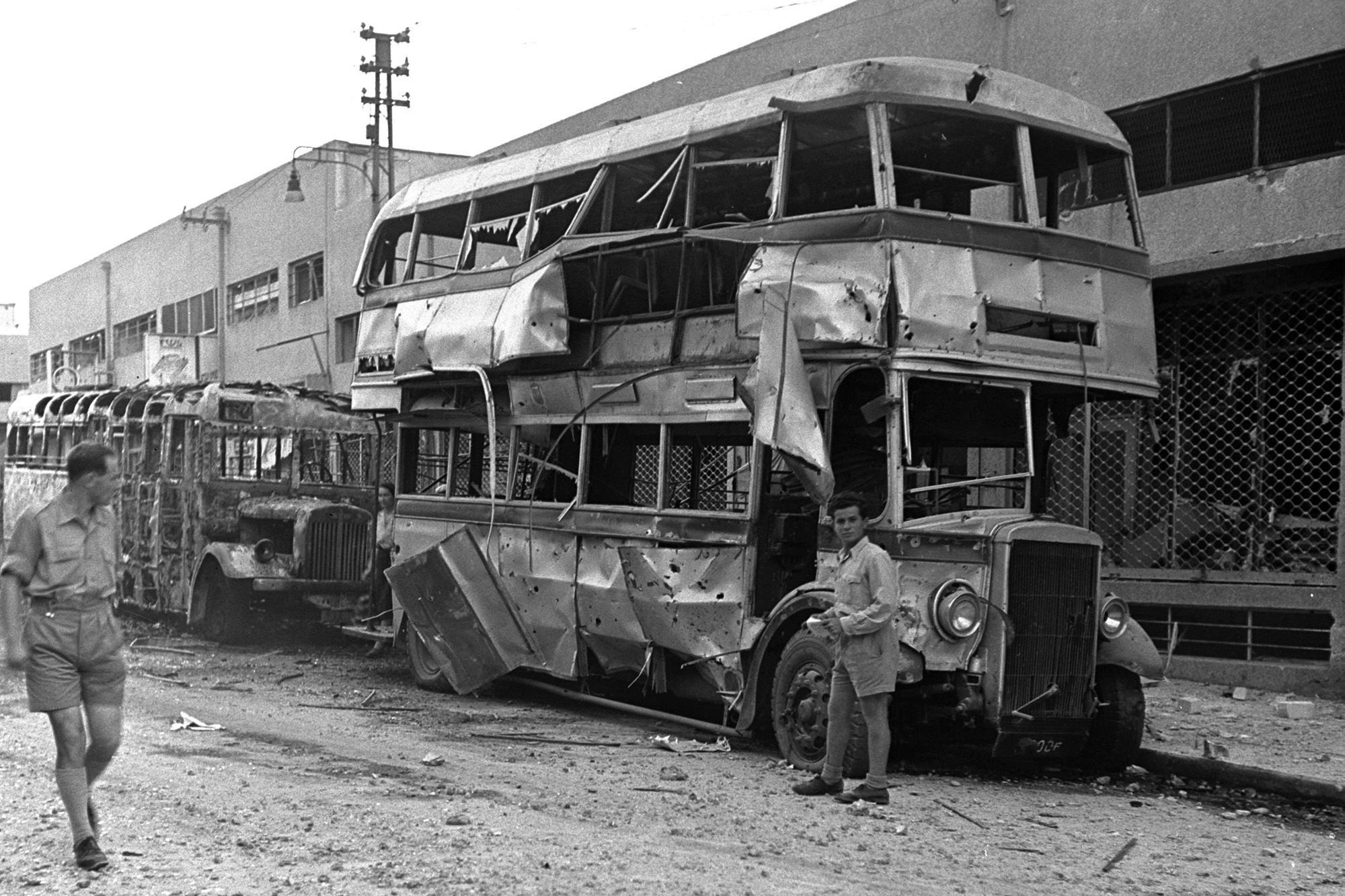
Buses damaged in the Egyptian attack on the Tel Aviv central bus station

The Haganah's embryonic air corps, Sherut Avir ("Air Service"), was established in November 1947 and became the Israeli Air Force following the establishment of the Israel Defense Forces. At the beginning of the war, Israel had no combat aircraft, only a hodge-podge of civilian aircraft which were used as makeshift bombers by having aircrew carry 25 and 50 pound bombs and incendiaries in their lap and manually drop them. Of the invading Arab nations, Egypt, Syria, and Iraq had air forces with fighter and bomber aircraft. However, many of their aircraft were unserviceable and they suffered from low competence among pilots as well as poor maintenance, ground control, and intelligence. Losses and diminishing ammunition stocks over the course of the war further reduced their effectiveness. Meanwhile, Israel gradually acquired combat aircraft, first fielding them in late May, and its air force only grew in strength.

On 15 May, with the beginning of the war, four Royal Egyptian Air Force (REAF) Spitfires attacked Tel Aviv, bombing Sde Dov Airfield, where the bulk of Sherut Avir's aircraft were concentrated, as well as the Reading Power Station. Several aircraft were destroyed, some others were damaged, and five people were killed. Throughout the following hours, additional waves of Egyptian aircraft bombed and strafed targets around Tel Aviv, although these raids had little effect. One Spitfire was shot down by machine gun fire and its pilot was taken prisoner.

Throughout following days, the REAF continued to attack Tel Aviv, causing civilian casualties. On 18 May, Egyptian warplanes attacked the Tel Aviv central bus station, killing 42 people and wounding over 100. In addition to their attacks on Tel Aviv, the Egyptians bombed Israeli ground troops, towns, rural settlements and airfields, though few casualties were caused by these raids. At the outset of the war, the REAF was able to attack Israel with near impunity, due to the lack of Israeli fighter aircraft to intercept them.

On 22 May, Egyptian Spitfires attacked RAF Ramat David, southeast of Haifa, while the base was still held by the Royal Air Force as it covered the withdrawal of British forces from Palestine. The Egyptians mistakenly believed that the Israelis had already taken over the base. The attack destroyed and damaged numerous aircraft, destroyed a hangar, and killed four RAF personnel. Five attacking Egyptian Spitfires were shot down by the RAF. The REAF took additional losses as the Israelis fielded more effective anti-aircraft defenses. By the end of May, the Egyptians had lost almost the entire Spitfire squadron based at El Arish, including many of their best pilots.

In the first weeks of the war, Israeli light aircraft bombed Arab encampments and columns. The raids were mostly carried out at night to avoid interception by Arab fighter aircraft. These attacks usually had little effect, except on morale.

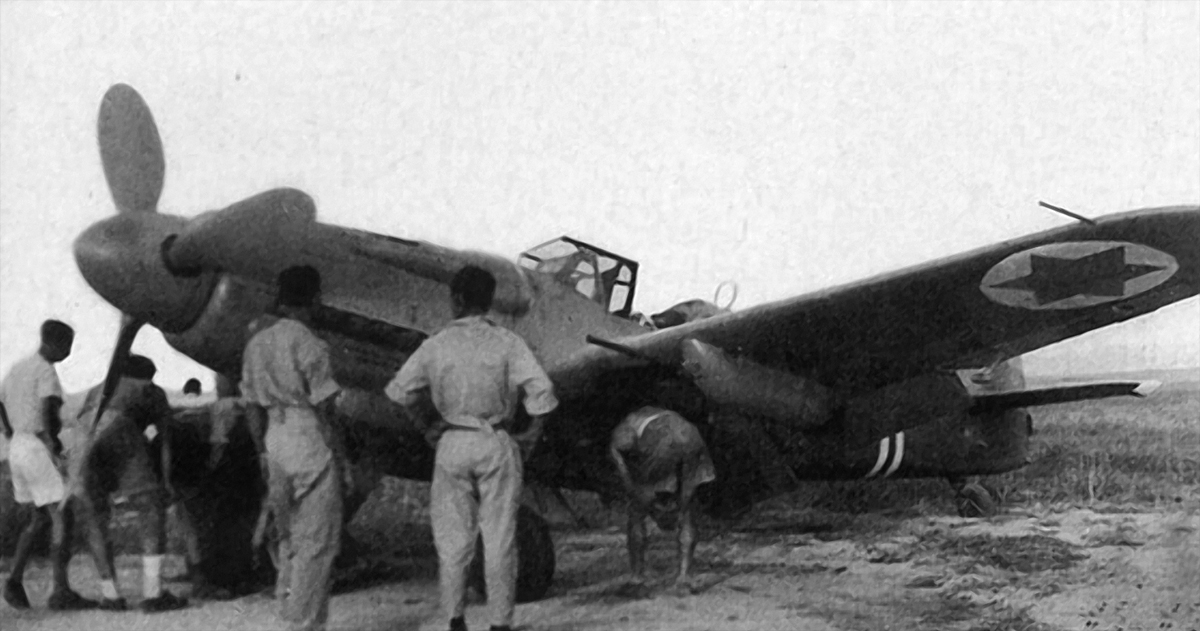
An Avia S-199, Israel's 1st fighter aircraft

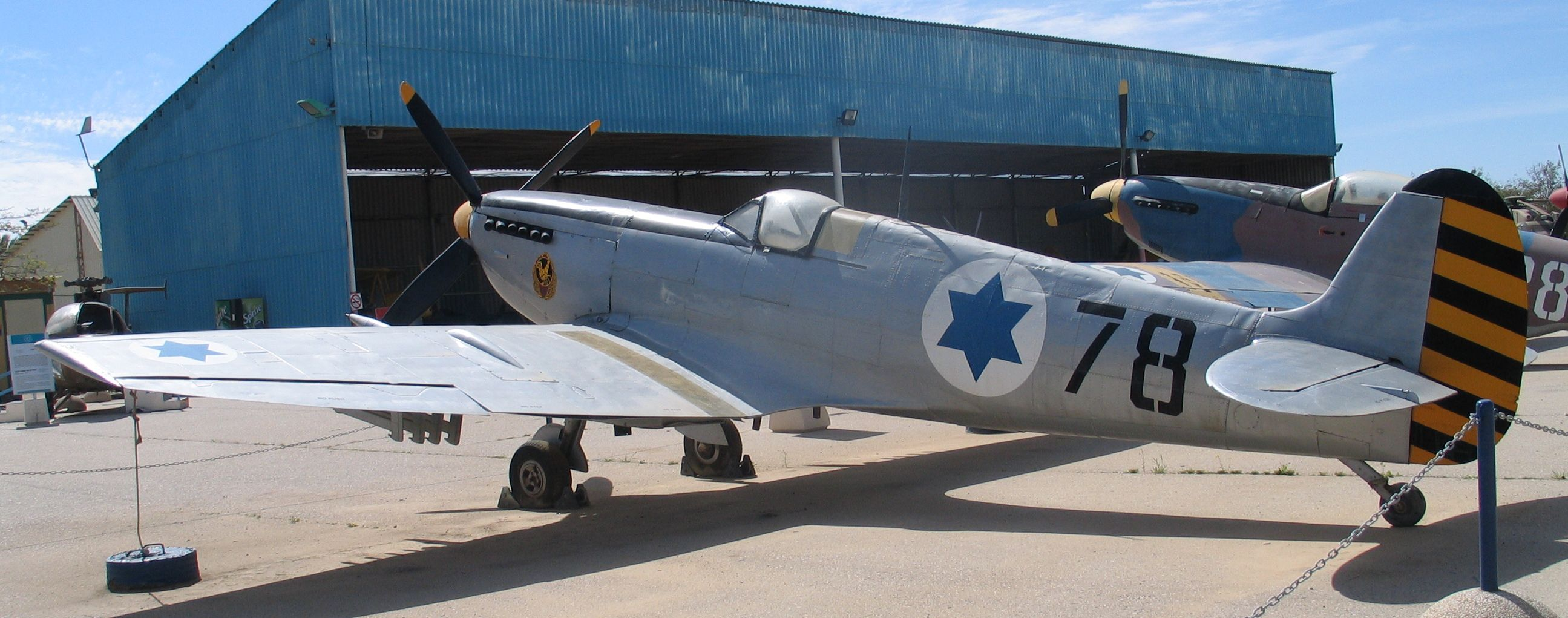
An Israeli Spitfire F Mk

The balance of air power soon began to swing in favor of the Israeli Air Force following the arrival of 25 Avia S-199s from Czechoslovakia, the first of which arrived in Israel on 20 May. Ironically, Israel was using the Avia S-199, an inferior derivative of the Bf 109 designed in Nazi Germany to counter British-designed Spitfires flown by Egypt. Throughout the rest of the war, Israel would acquire more Avia fighters, as well as 62 Spitfires from Czechoslovakia. On 28 May 1948, Sherut Avir became the Israeli Air Force.

On 3 June, Israel scored its first victory in aerial combat when Israeli pilot Modi Alon shot down a pair of Egyptian DC-3s that had just bombed Tel Aviv. Although Tel Aviv would see additional raids by fighter aircraft, there would be no more raids by bombers for the rest of the war. From then on, the Israeli Air Force began engaging the Arab air forces in air-to-air combat. The first dogfight took place on 8 June, when an Israeli fighter plane flown by Gideon Lichtman shot down an Egyptian Spitfire. By the fall of 1948, the IAF had achieved air superiority and had superior firepower and more knowledgeable personnel, many of whom had seen action in World War II. Many of the pilots who fought for the Israeli Air Force were foreign volunteers or mercenaries, including many World War II veterans.

Following Israeli air attacks on Egyptian and Iraqi columns, the Egyptians repeatedly bombed Ekron Airfield, where IAF fighters were based. During a 30 May raid, bombs aimed for Ekron hit central Rehovot, killing 7 civilians and wounding 30. In response to this, and probably to the Jordanian victories in the Battles of Latrun, Israel began bombing targets in Arab cities. On the night of 31 May/1 June, the first Israeli raid on an Arab capital took place when three Israeli aircraft attacked Amman, dropping several dozen 55 and 110-pound bombs, hitting the King's Palace and an adjacent British airfield. Some 12 people were killed and 30 wounded. During the attack, an RAF hangar was damaged, as were some British aircraft. The British threatened that in the event of another such attack, they would shoot down the attacking aircraft and bomb Israeli airfields, and as a result, Israeli aircraft did not attack Amman again for the rest of the war. On 11 June, hours before the first truce came into effect, the Israeli Air Force carried out a raid on Damascus with a lone C-47 Skytrain dropping explosive and incendiary bombs over the city, killing 22 people.

==== Sea battles ====
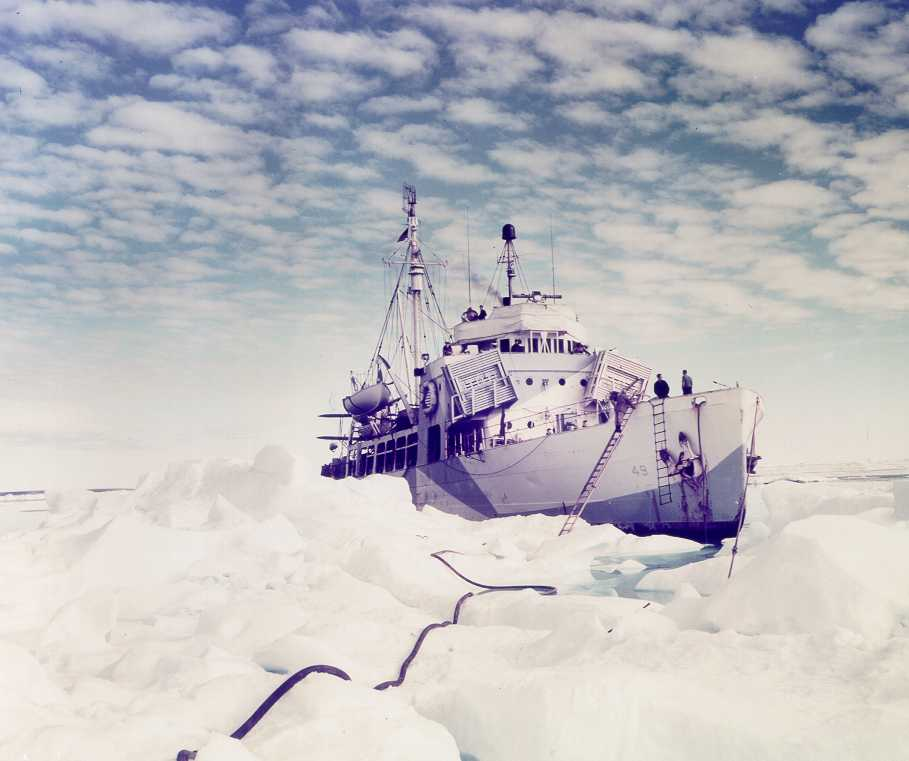
Northland in Greenland circa 1944 which became the INS Eilat

At the outset of the war, the Israeli Navy consisted of three former Aliyah Bet ships that had been seized by the British and impounded in Haifa harbour, where they were tied up at the breakwater. Work on establishing a navy had begun shortly before Israeli independence, and the three ships were selected due to them having a military background – one, the INS Eilat, was the ex-US Coast Guard gunboat USCGC Northland, and the other two, the INS Haganah and INS Wedgwood, had been Royal Canadian Navy corvettes. Later, the former US Navy submarine chaser USS PC-1265 was purchased from the United States and became the INS Noga. It arrived in Israel in September 1948.

The ships were put into minimum running condition by contractors dressed as stevedores and port personnel, who were able to work in the engine rooms and below deck. The work had to be clandestine to avoid arousing British suspicion. On 21 May 1948, the three ships set sail for Tel Aviv, and were made to look like ships that had been purchased by foreign owners for commercial use. In Tel Aviv, the ships were fitted with small field guns dating to the late 19th century and anti-aircraft guns.

The only significant naval combat until the first truce took place on 2–4 June. An Egyptian corvette shelled Caesarea, which was home to a small Israeli naval station, and withdrew, causing little damage and no casualties. On 4 June, a flotilla of three Egyptian warships consisting of a corvette, landing craft, and armed troop carrier, appeared off Tel Aviv, possibly intending to shell the city or launch a commando raid. They were engaged by the INS Eilat, which was kept at bay by the larger guns of the Egyptian ships. Three Israeli aircraft then attacked the Egyptian ships, dropping bombs and strafing them. One of the Egyptian ships was hit by a bomb and one of the Israeli aircraft was shot down. The Egyptian warships then withdrew under cover of a smokescreen.

==== Israeli use of biological warfare ====
Research by Israeli historians Benny Morris and Benjamin Kedar show that during the 1948 war, Israel conducted a biological warfare operation codenamed Cast Thy Bread. According to Morris and Kedar, the Haganah initially used typhoid bacteria to contaminate water wells in newly cleared Arab villages to prevent the population including militiamen from returning. Later, the biological warfare campaign expanded to include Jewish settlements that were in imminent danger of being captured by Arab troops and inhabited Arab towns not slated for capture. There were also plans to expand the biological warfare campaign into other Arab states including Egypt, Lebanon and Syria, but they were not carried out.

==== End of the first phase ====
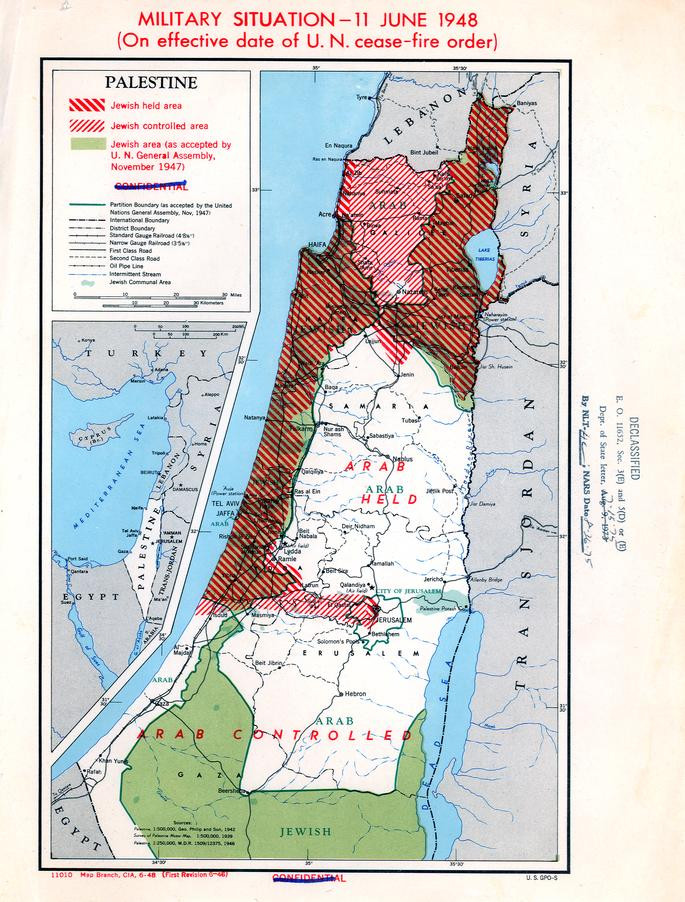
The Palestine Military Situation, 11 June 1948. Truman Papers

The first four weeks of the war were a decisive Israeli success. The Israelis managed to hold off the Arab forces, managing to keep most of their territory and expand their holdings. According to Benny Morris, in retrospect this had been the only period of the war in which the Arabs could have won or at least made major territorial gains at Israeli expense. The Syrians were stopped just west of the original border between Palestine and Syria, the Jordanians and Iraqis occupied territory that had been allotted to the Palestinian Arabs, with the Jewish Quarter of the Old City of Jerusalem being the only Israeli-held territory that they managed to capture, and the Egyptians were stopped roughly at the northern limit of the southern part of Palestine that had been intended to go to the Arabs, although they did manage to cut off some Israeli troops and settlements. The Israelis expanded their territorial holdings in some areas, such as the Western Galilee and Jerusalem area. The IDF was also larger and better equipped than at the beginning of the war. The Israelis had also moved onto the offensive, and while initial counterattacks at Latrun, Isdud, and Jenin failed, the strategic initiative passed into their hands.

Upon the implementation of the truce, the IDF had control over nine Arab cities and towns or mixed cities and towns: New Jerusalem, Jaffa, Haifa, Acre, Safed, Tiberias, Baysan (Beit She'an), Samakh and Yibna (Yavne). Another city, Jenin, was not occupied but its residents fled. The combined Arab forces captured 14 Jewish settlement points, but only one of them, Mishmar HaYarden, was in the territory of the proposed Jewish State according to Resolution 181.

Within the boundaries of the proposed Jewish state, there were twelve Arab villages which opposed Jewish control or were captured by the invading Arab armies, and in addition to them, the Lod Airport and pumping station near Antipatris, which were within the boundaries of the proposed Jewish state, were under the control of the Arabs. The IDF captured about 50 large Arab villages outside of the boundaries of the proposed Jewish State and a larger number of hamlets and Bedouin encampments. 350 square kilometres of the proposed Jewish State were under the control of the Arab forces, while 700 square kilometres of the proposed Arab State were under the control of the IDF. This figure ignores the Negev desert which was not under any absolute control of either side.

In the period between the invasion and the first truce the Syrian army had 315 of its men killed and 400–500 injured; the Iraqi expeditionary force had 200 of its men killed and 500 injured; the Jordanian Arab Legion had 300 of its men killed and 400–500 injured (including irregulars and Palestinian volunteers fighting under the Jordanians); the Egyptian army had 600 of its men killed and 1,400 injured (including irregulars from the Muslim Brotherhood); the ALA, which returned to fight in early June, had 100 of its men killed or injured. 800 Jews were taken prisoner by the Arabs and 1,300 Arabs were taken prisoner by the Jews, mostly Palestinians.

=== First truce: 11 June – 8 July 1948 ===
The UN declared a truce on 29 May, which came into effect on 11 June and lasted 28 days. The truce was designed to last 28 days and an arms embargo was declared with the intention that neither side would make any gains from the truce. Neither side respected the truce; both found ways around the restrictions placed on them. Both the Israelis and the Arabs used this time to improve their positions, a direct violation of the terms of the ceasefire.

==== Reinforcements and reorganization ====
Israeli Forces 1948
Initial strength	29,677
4 June	40,825
17 July	63,586
7 October	88,033
28 October	92,275
2 December	106,900
23 December	107,652
30 December	108,300

At the time of the truce, the British view was that "the Jews are too weak in armament to achieve spectacular success". As the truce commenced, a British officer stationed in Haifa stated that the four-week-long truce "would certainly be exploited by the Jews to continue military training and reorganization while the Arabs would waste [them] feuding over the future divisions of the spoils". During the truce, the Israelis sought to bolster their forces by massive import of arms. The IDF was able to continue importing large amounts of weapons from Czechoslovakia as well as those weapons purchased abroad elsewhere during the truce. The IDF was also able to improve training of forces and carry out reorganization during this time, including improvements to its command and control. Yitzhak Rabin, an IDF commander at the time of the war and later Israel's fifth Prime Minister, stated "[w]ithout the arms from Czechoslovakia... it is very doubtful whether we would have been able to conduct the war".

The Israeli army increased its manpower from approximately 30,000–35,000 men to almost 65,000 during the truce due to mobilization and the constant immigration into Israel. Most existing IDF brigades were expanded with two new brigades entering service. The import of massive quantities of weapons and munitions from Czechoslovakia continued, with about 25,000 rifles, 5,000 machine guns, and fifty million bullets from Czechoslovakia having reached Israel by the end of the truce. In addition, Israel received heavy weaponry that had been purchased in the United States and Western Europe during both the initial four weeks of fighting and the truce, with numerous artillery pieces and armored vehicles, mostly American-built half-tracks, some of which had mounted guns and mortars, arriving by the end of June, as well as a continued trickle of fighter aircraft from Czechoslovakia. After the truce ended, the IDF was able to resume fighting in a far stronger position. According to Benny Morris, "the army that confronted the Arab states on 8–9 July was radically different from, and far stronger than, that which they had met on 15 May."

As well as violating the arms and personnel embargo, the Israelis also sent fresh units to the front lines, much as their Arab enemies did. In addition to reinforcing their lines with fresh units, the Arabs violated the truce by continuing to block supplies from reaching Israeli settlements they had cut off and occasionally opening fire while the Israelis raided and occupied positions that would give them an advantage when combat resumed.

In addition to bolstering their military forces, the Israelis managed to rapidly turn all of the pre-state national institutions of the Yishuv into full-fledged state institutions during the initial four weeks of fighting and the truce period. They also used the truce to begin planning and establishing new settlements, mostly on territory they had recently conquered.

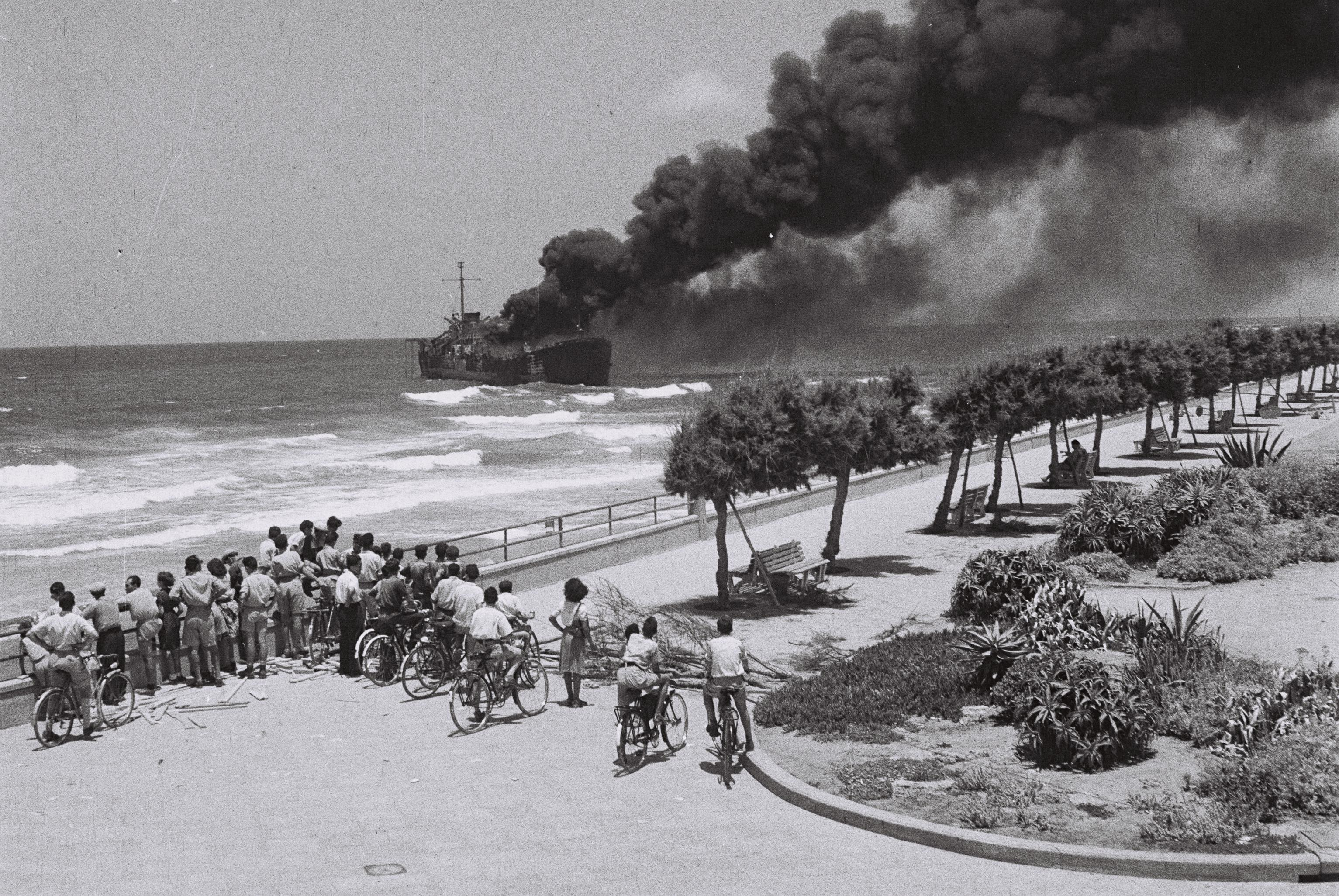
Altalena burning near Tel Aviv beach

During the truce, in what became known as the Altalena Affair, the Irgun attempted to bring in a private arms shipment aboard a ship called Altalena. Fearing a coup by the Irgun, which was being integrated into the IDF Ben-Gurion ordered that the arms be confiscated by force. After some miscommunication, the army was ordered by Ben-Gurion to sink the ship. Sixteen Irgun members and three IDF soldiers were killed in the fighting.

==== UN mediator Bernadotte ====
UN Palestine mediator, Folke Bernadotte, assassinated in September 1948 by the militant group Lehi

The ceasefire was overseen by UN mediator Folke Bernadotte and a team of UN Observers made up of army officers from Belgium, United States, Sweden and France. Bernadotte was voted in by the General Assembly to "assure the safety of the holy places, to safeguard the well-being of the population, and to promote 'a peaceful adjustment of the future situation of Palestine'". Folke Bernadotte reported:

During the period of the truce, three violations occurred ... of such a serious nature:

1. the attempt by ...the Irgun Zvai Leumi to bring war materials and immigrants, including men of military age, into Palestine aboard the ship Altalena on 21 June...
2. Another truce violation occurred through the refusal of Egyptian forces to permit the passage of relief convoys to Jewish settlements in the Negeb...
3. The third violation of the truce arose as a result of the failure of the Transjordan and Iraqi forces to permit the flow of water to Jerusalem.

After the truce was in place, Bernadotte began to address the issue of achieving a political settlement. The main obstacles in his opinion were "the Arab world's continued rejection of the existence of a Jewish state, whatever its borders; Israel's new 'philosophy', based on its increasing military strength, of ignoring the partition boundaries and conquering what additional territory it could; and the emerging Palestinian Arab refugee problem".

Taking all the issues into account, Bernadotte presented a new partition plan. He proposed there be a Palestinian Arab state alongside Israel and that a "Union" "be established between the two sovereign states of Israel and Jordan (which now included the West Bank); that the Negev, or part of it, be included in the Arab state and that Western Galilee, or part of it, be included in Israel; that the whole of Jerusalem be part of the Arab state, with the Jewish areas enjoying municipal autonomy and that Lydda Airport and Haifa be 'free ports' – presumably free of Israeli or Arab sovereignty". Israel rejected the proposal, in particular the aspect of losing control of Jerusalem, but they did agree to extend the truce for another month. The Arabs rejected both the extension of the truce and the proposal.

=== Second phase: 8–18 July 1948 ("Ten Day Battles") ===
On 8 July, the day before the expiration of the truce, Egyptian forces under General Muhammad Naguib renewed the war, launching an offensive in the hopes of catching the IDF off guard. Shortly afterward, the IDF launched simultaneous offensives on all fronts. This period was also marked by increased aerial activity by both sides, with Israel bombing numerous Arab cities and the Egyptians bombing Tel Aviv. The fighting continued for ten days until the UN Security Council declared the second truce on 18 July. During the fighting, the Israelis were able to open a lifeline to a number of besieged kibbutzim.

==== Southern front ====
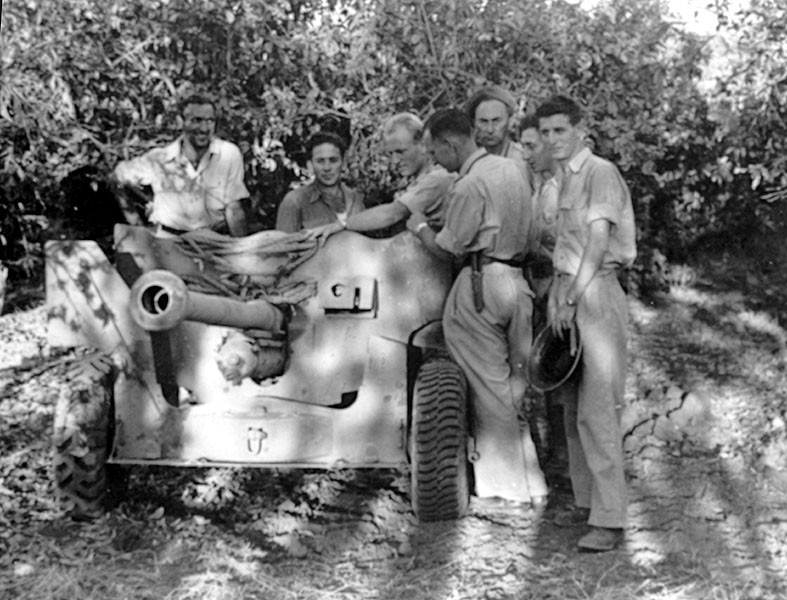
An Egyptian artillery piece captured by battalion 53 of the Givati Brigade.

The initial focus of fighting in the south was a strip of territory along the Majdal-Al-Faluja-Bayt Jibrin road which linked their major holdings, both of the main force up to Isdud and the secondary force up to Hebron and Bethlehem, and which cut off Israeli settlements in the Negev as well as Israeli forces protecting them. Israel planned an offensive to break the Egyptian hold on this strip. On 8 July, the Egyptians preempted with an offensive of their own to deepen their hold, which was partially successful. While some attacks were repulsed, the Egyptians managed to take an important crossroads southwest of Negba. In addition, the Israelis evacuated Kfar Darom due to its position being considered untenable.

Soon after, the IDF went on the offensive, launching Operation An-Far. The Israelis took and then withdrew from Iraq Suwaydan and Bayt 'Affa although they failed to take the Iraq Suwaydan police fort. They captured Ibdis and subsequently held off Egyptian counterattacks with air support, and also took Tell es-Safi. On 12 July, the Egyptians counterattacked with an assault on Negba, an important point in the Israeli lines. While launching two diversionary assaults at Julis and Ibdis, the Egyptians launched a series of attacks against Negba using three infantry battalions, an armored battalion, and an artillery regiment. The attacks were repulsed, with the Egyptians suffering an estimated 200–300 casualties while the Israelis lost 5 killed and 16 wounded.

The IDF continued its offensive in the following days, capturing a hill north of Negba and raiding Egyptian positions. On 16–18 July, the Israelis carried out Operation Death to the Invader to link the Israeli settlements in the Negev with core Israeli territory. The offensive succeeded in capturing numerous villages, although attacks on two villages were repulsed. However, the objective of achieving a link between the Israeli settlement concentration in the Negev and the rest of Israeli-held territory was not achieved. The IDF also managed to temporarily disrupt Egyptian traffic along the Majdal-Bayt Jibrin road with the capture of Karatiyya although the Egyptians swiftly built a bypass road. Meanwhile, the Egyptians launched a series of attacks of their own, which failed. On 14 July, an Egyptian attack on Gal On was repulsed. The Egyptians then assaulted the lightly defended village of Be'erot Yitzhak. The Egyptians managed to penetrate the village perimeter, but the defenders concentrated in an inner position in the village and fought off the Egyptian advance until IDF reinforcements arrived and drove out the attackers. The Egyptians suffered an estimated 200 casualties, while the Israelis had 17 dead and 15 wounded. The Egyptians did not attack any more Israeli villages following this battle. On 18 July, an Egyptian counterattack against Karatiyya was repulsed after an Egyptian tank was knocked out by an Israeli PIAT, causing the remaining tanks and infantry to retreat.

==== Operation Dani ====
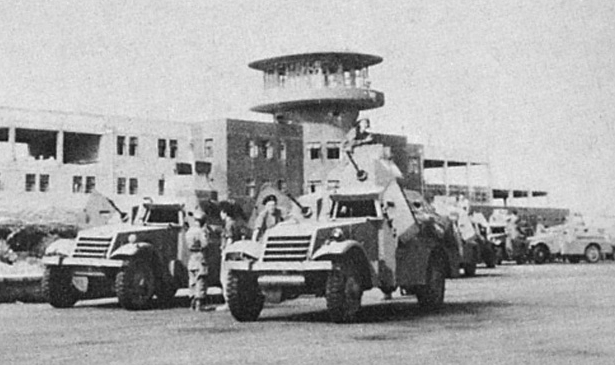
Israeli forces at Lydda Airport after capturing it during Operation Dani

The most important Israeli offensive launched during this period was Operation Dani, which was aimed at capturing the remaining Arab-held sections of the Tel Aviv-Jerusalem road and the hills to its north from Latrun to Ramallah. The plan of Operation Dani was to capture territory east of Tel Aviv and then to push inland and relieve the Jewish population and forces in Jerusalem. The cities of Lydda and Ramle were particularly crucial. Lydda had become an important military center in the region, lending support to Arab military activities elsewhere, and Ramle was one of the main obstacles blocking Jewish transportation. Each town was defended by token Arab Legion forces as well as local militias and Jordanian tribal irregulars. Lydda in particular had a local militia of around 1,000 residents and an Arab Legion contingent of 125–300. The Arab Legion's 4th Regiment, which had a substantial force of armored cars and artillery pieces, also joined the fighting on 10 July. The IDF committed what was up to then its strongest force ever to the operation, comprising three brigades, several additional battalions, and some 30 artillery pieces.

===== Lydda and Ramle =====
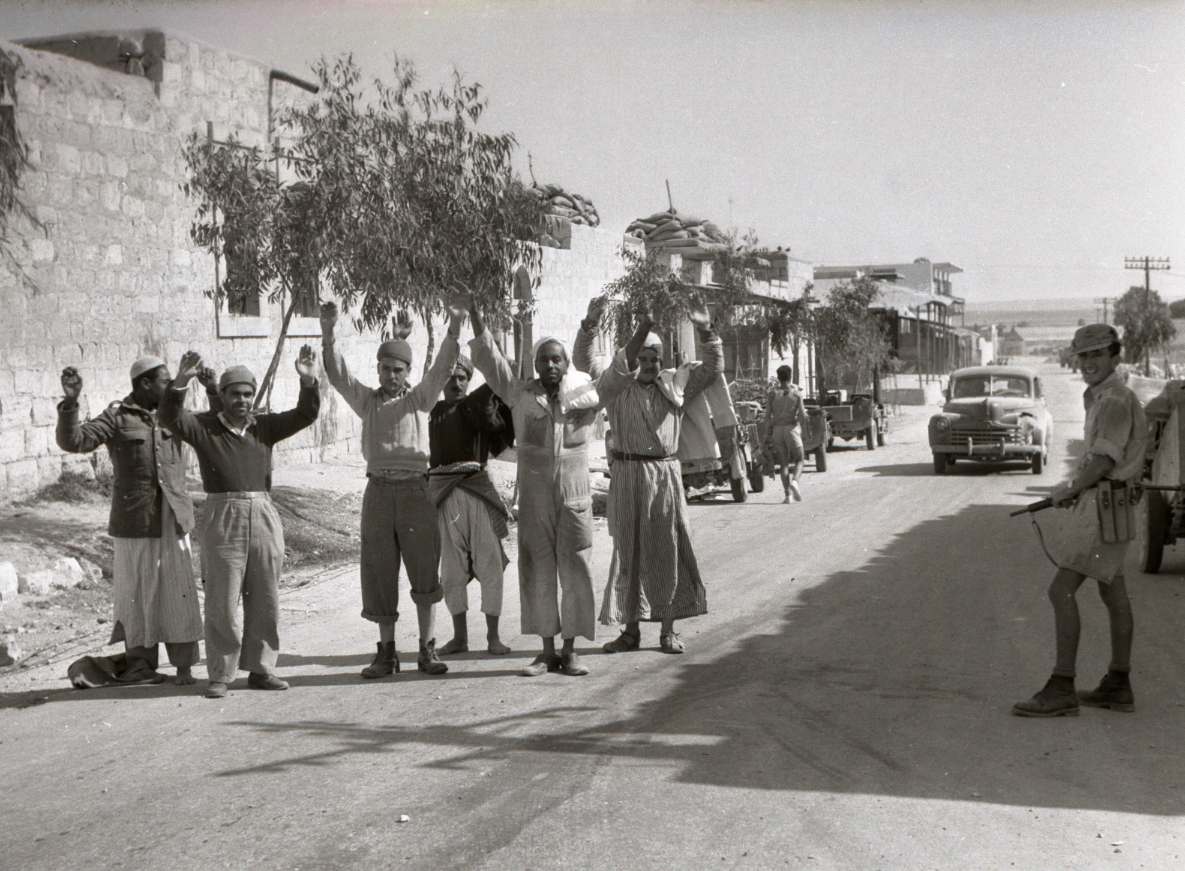
An Israeli soldier with detained Palestinians in Ramle, July 1948

The IDF launched a pincer movement to surround the cities of Lydda and Ramle on 10 July. Two brigades, one of which was augmented by two additional battalions, took numerous villages in their path along with Lydda Airport. On the following day, the IDF advanced on Lydda from the north via Majdal al-Sadiq and al-Muzayri'a, and from the east via Khulda, al-Qubab, Jimzu and Daniyal. Israeli forces also used bombers for the first time in the conflict to bombard the city. Resistance was initially light, although the IDF failed to capture Dayr Tarif in a fierce battle with the Arab Legion, while the Legion in turn launched an attack against IDF troops in Jimzu which was repulsed. The IDF captured Lydda on 11 July after an initial attack on the city was repulsed, while Ramla was occupied without a fight the following day after its notables surrendered.

On 12 July, after the fighting had initially settled down, an Arab Legion armored car unit entered Lydda and a firefight with IDF troops ensued, during which some locals joined the fighting and shot at IDF troops. This was interpreted by the Israeli government as "rebellion" and Ben-Gurion authorized the expulsion of the civilian populations of Lydda and Ramla. The civilian populations of Lydda and Ramle, totalling some 50,000–70,000 people, were subsequently violently expelled. (Note: Slater, Jerome, Mythologies Without End: The US, Israel, and the Arab-Israeli Conflict, 1917–2020 (New York, 2020; online edn, Oxford Academic, 19 Nov. 2020), https://doi.org/10.1093/oso/9780190459086.003.0001. "During the 1948 war Rabin was a leading Haganah general and commander of a force that violently expelled 50,000 inhabitants of the Palestinian towns of Lydda and Ramle.") (Note: Pappé 2006, "[...] expelled the populations of the two towns of Lydd and Ramla, altogether 70,000 people") Hundreds of Palestinians were killed in multiple mass killing events in Lydda, and many were expelled without the provision of transport vehicles, as had been done in Ramle; many of the evictees died on the long walk under the hot July sun.

To the northeast, the IDF's Alexandroni Brigade took two Iraqi-held villages north of Qula. The Arab Legion's 1st Brigade counterattacked against Qula and days of fighting ensued, with the village repeatedly changing hands until the Alexandroni Brigade secured the village on 18 July right before the second truce came into effect. After the final assault on the village, the bodies of 16 Alexandroni Brigade prisoners previously captured there were found, most of them mutilated.

From 13 to 18 July, the Israelis launched a series of minor attacks before the second truce, making some additional gains. Crucially, they took a series of villages south of the Tel Aviv-Jerusalem road, opening a new road to Jerusalem.

===== Latrun =====
On 15–16 July, the Israelis launched an attack on Latrun but did not manage to occupy the fort. A desperate second attempt occurred on 18 July by units from the Yiftach Brigade equipped with armored vehicles, including two Cromwell tanks, but that attack also failed.

==== Jerusalem ====
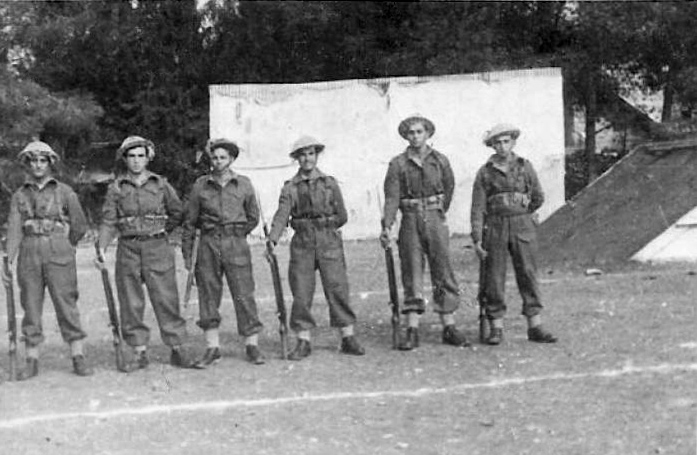
Beit Horon Battalion soldiers in the Russian Compound in Jerusalem, 1948

In Jerusalem, the IDF and the Irgun and Lehi contingents in the city launched Operation Kedem with the aim of securing the Old City of Jerusalem. The IDF, Irgun, and Lehi initially captured a number of locations adjacent to Jerusalem prior to launching the main assault. On 16–17 July, the IDF, Irgun, and Lehi launched the attack to conquer the Old City. The attack failed, although a position adjacent to the New Gate was temporarily captured.

==== Galilee ====
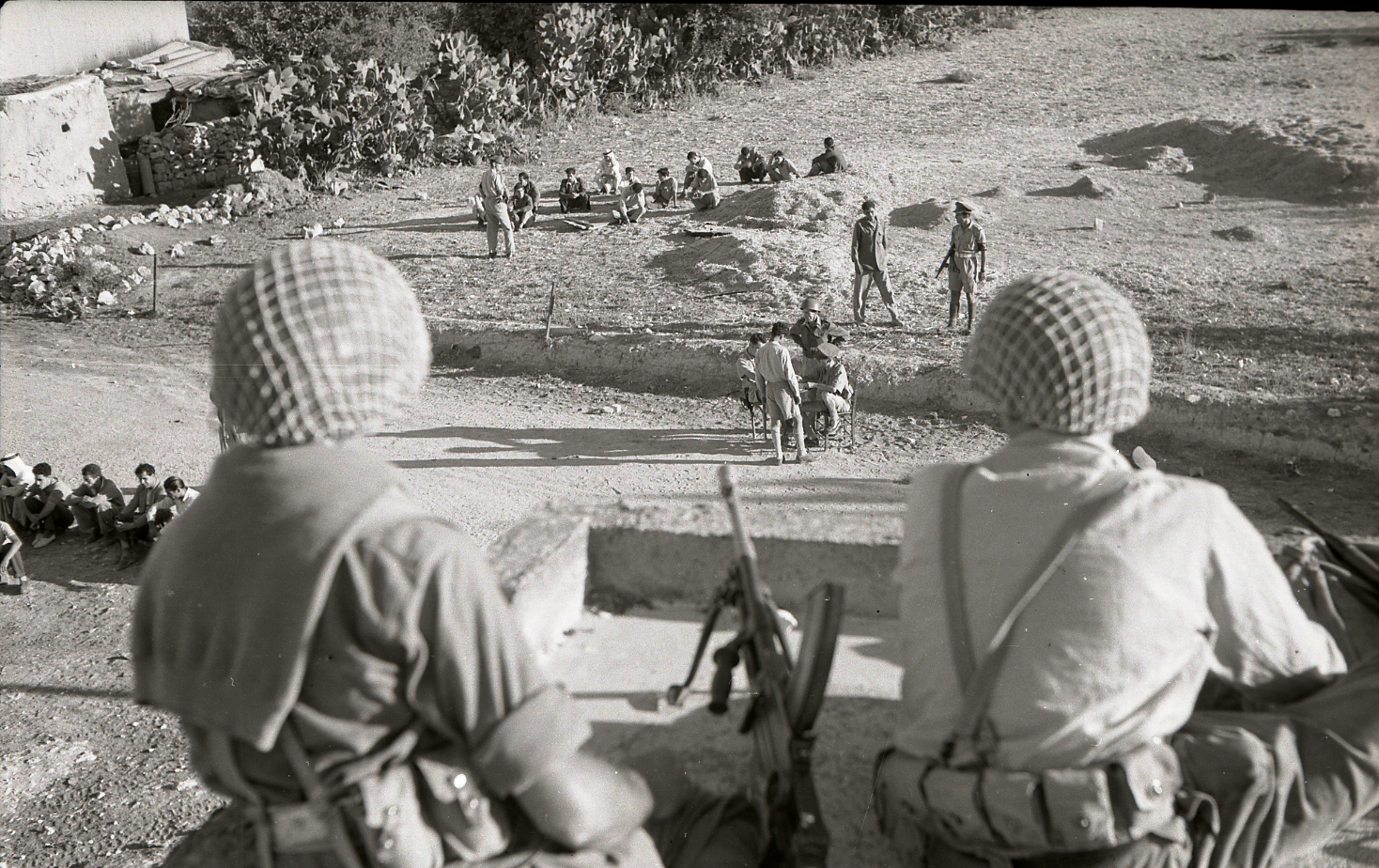
Israeli soldiers in Nazareth during Operation Dekel, 16 July 1948.

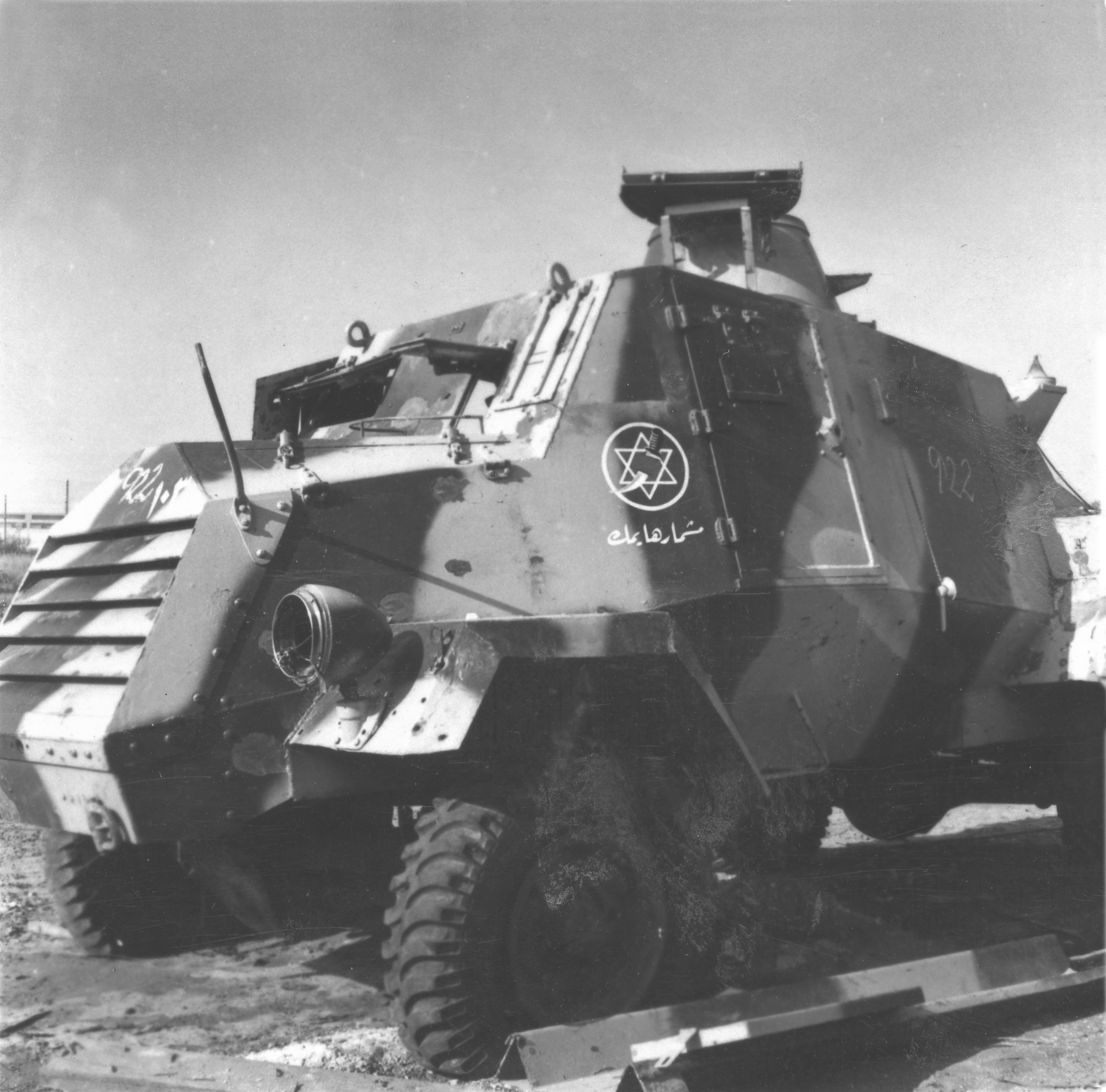
An ALA armored car captured by the IDF in the Galilee

Israel launched Operation Dekel with the aim of capturing the Lower Galilee from the Arab Liberation Army and local irregulars. The IDF advanced throughout the Lower Galilee, overcoming weak resistance, beating back ineffective ALA counterattacks, and capturing numerous villages. Druze communities were taken without a fight as the Druze had decided to throw their lot in with Israel. On 16 July, Nazareth fell to the IDF with only minimal resistance. The IDF subsequently advanced north, capturing more villages, although a thrust to the east to Sakhnin met an ALA counterattack that resulted in an IDF withdrawal.

In the Eastern Galilee, the IDF took Kafr Sabt, west of the Sea of Galilee, on 9–10 July. In response, the ALA launched a series of attacks to take Ilaniya. The ALA threw most of its energies into the effort, deploying infantry, armored cars, and an artillery battery, which enabled the easy conquests of Operation Dekel. The ALA's repeated attacks on Ilaniya during 11–16 July were repulsed with heavy losses. On 18 July, just before the second truce came into effect, the IDF captured Lubya. In the Western Galilee, the IDF failed to take the villages of Tarshiha and Mi'ilya.

The IDF launched Operation Brosh as a brigade-sized operation to dislodge Syrian forces from the Eastern Galilee and the Benot Yaakov Bridge. The Israelis and Syrians each launched a series of attacks and counterattacks with ground repeatedly changing hands. The Israelis gained some ground but failed to dislodge the Syrians, who remained in the area until the 1949 armistice. The IDF lost 95 killed and about 200 wounded, and estimated that Syrian losses were twice as high.

==== Air operations ====
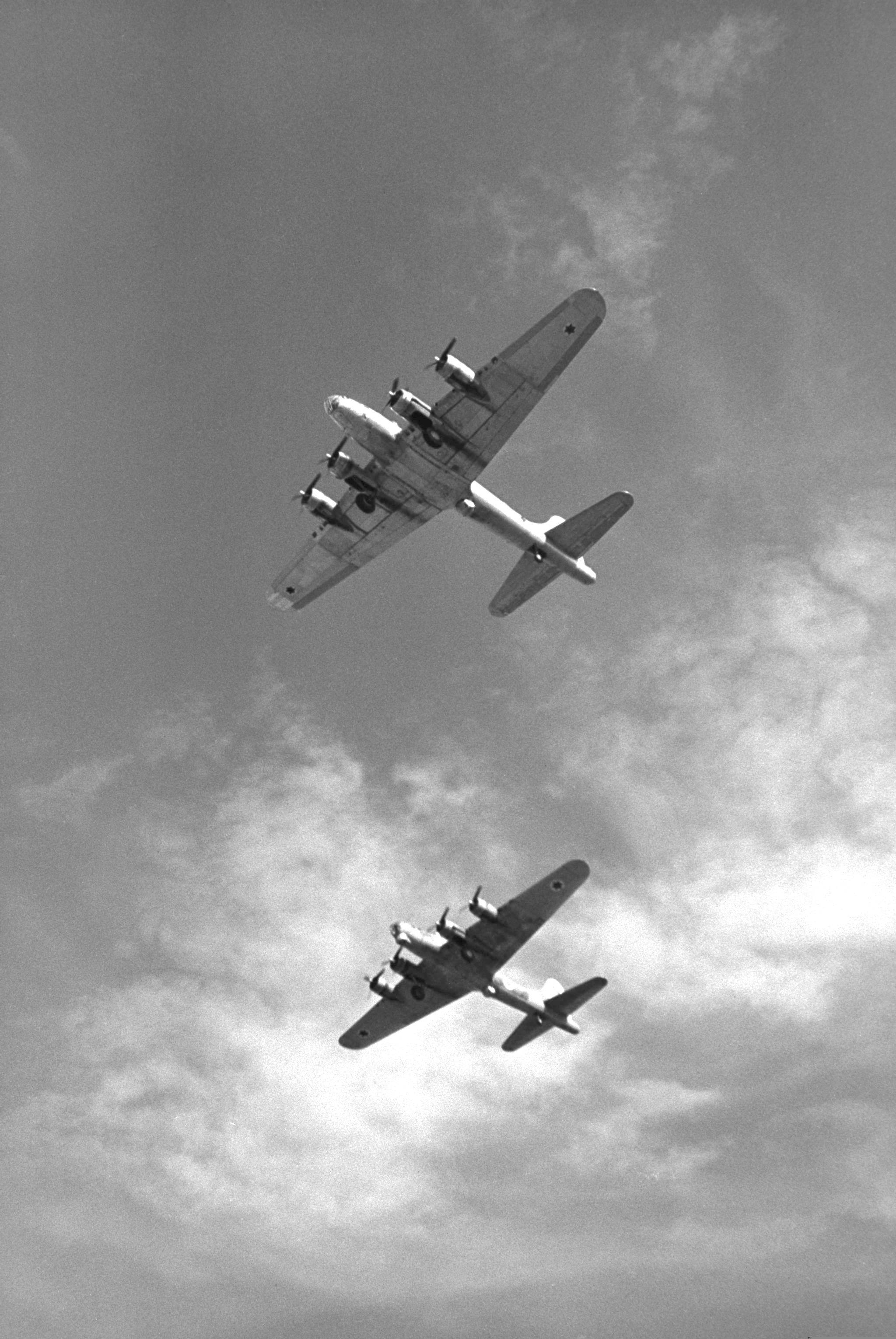
Israeli B-17s in flight

As in the first round of fighting, air operations during the Ten Days had minimal military impact, although they affected morale. The most significant air attack during this period was the Israeli bombing of Cairo. Three B-17 bombers that had been acquired by the Haganah in the United States and flown to Czechoslovakia for outfitting and arming flew to Israel on 15 July with orders to bomb Egyptian targets en route. One B-17 bombed Cairo, aiming for Abdeen Palace. The bombs missed their target but caused damage nearby, including to a railway line, and killed 30 people. The two other B-17s bombed Rafah. The Egyptians responded with raids on Tel Aviv by Dakota aircraft accompanied by a Spitfire fighter escort, killing at least 15 people. One Egyptian Dakota was lost. Subsequently, the Israeli Air Force bombed El Arish and Syrian positions near Mishmar HaYarden with the B-17s. An Israeli Dakota also bombed Damascus, which was followed up by another raid on Damascus by an Israeli B-17 which aimed at Mezzeh Air Base but hit civilian areas. Dozens of people were killed in these attacks.

In addition, Israeli Air Force fighter aircraft flew ground support missions and on occasion intercepted Egyptian aircraft. Syrian aircraft also launched attacks in the Mishmar HaYarden area. Arab air forces were almost completely ineffective during this period.

=== Second truce: 18 July – 15 October 1948 ===
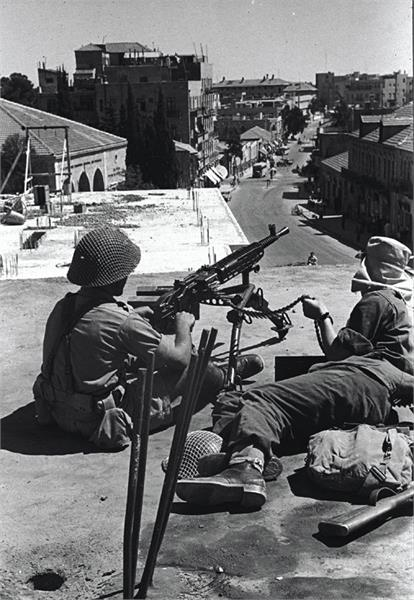
Israeli soldiers in Jerusalem, August 1948.

At 19:00 on 18 July, the second truce of the conflict went into effect after intense diplomatic efforts by the UN. It lasted until 15 October.

During the truce, especially during the first days, both sides tried to improve their tactical positions. The Egyptians also violated the terms of the truce by blocking supply convoys to Israeli settlements in the Negev. As a result, numerous exchanges of fire took place. The Israelis also launched three large-scale efforts to push through supply convoys to their settlement enclave, one of which succeeded.

On 16 September, Count Folke Bernadotte proposed a new partition for Palestine in which the Negev would be divided between Jordan and Egypt, and Jordan would annexe Lydda and Ramla. There would be a Jewish state in the whole of Galilee, with the frontier running from Faluja northeast towards Ramla and Lydda. Jerusalem would be internationalised, with municipal autonomy for the city's Jewish and Arab inhabitants, the Port of Haifa would be a free port, and Lydda Airport would be a free airport. All Palestinian refugees would be granted the right of return, and those who chose not to return would be compensated for lost property. The UN would control and regulate Jewish immigration.

The plan was once again rejected by both sides. On the next day, 17 September, Bernadotte was assassinated in Jerusalem by the militant Zionist group Lehi. A four-man team ambushed Bernadotte's motorcade in Jerusalem, killing him and a French UN observer sitting next to him. Lehi saw Bernadotte as a British and Arab puppet, and thus a serious threat to the emerging State of Israel, and feared that the provisional Israeli government would accept the plan, which it considered disastrous. Unbeknownst to Lehi, the government had already decided to reject it and resume combat in a month. Bernadotte's deputy, American Ralph Bunche, replaced him.

On 22 September 1948, the Provisional State Council of Israel passed the Area of Jurisdiction and Powers Ordinance, 5708–1948, applying Israeli jurisdiction to all areas of Palestine taken since the war began. It also declared that from then on, any part of Palestine defined by the Defense Minister as being held by the IDF would be added to Israeli jurisdiction.

=== Little Triangle pocket ===
The Arab villagers of the area known as the "Little Triangle" south of Haifa repeatedly fired at Israeli traffic along the main road from Tel Aviv to Haifa and were supplied by the Iraqis from northern Samaria. The sniping at traffic continued during the second truce. Poorly planned assaults on 18 June and 8 July had failed to dislodge Arab militia from their superior positions. The Israelis decided to launch an offensive during the truce. Ben-Gurion believed that since the Little Triangle lay within the boundaries of the Jewish state in the UN partition plan, Israel would have legitimacy to take military action there during the truce and define it as an internal police action. After several days of intermittent aerial and artillery attacks, the IDF launched Operation Shoter ("Operation Policeman") against the Little Triangle on 24 July in order to gain control of the main road to Haifa and to destroy all the enemy in the area.

Israeli assaults on 24 and 25 July were beaten back with stiff resistance. The Israelis then broke the Arab defenses with a combined infantry and armor assault backed by heavy shelling and bombing. Three Arab villages surrendered, and most of the inhabitants fled before and during the attack. Most of the inhabitants fled before and during the attack, reaching northern Samaria; hundreds were forcibly expelled during the following days. At least a hundred militiamen and civilians were killed.

The Little Triangle was the final Arab pocket on the Tel Aviv-Haifa road. With its capture, traffic along the road was restored, as was railway traffic between Haifa and Hadera.

=== Third phase: 15 October 1948 – 10 March 1949 ===
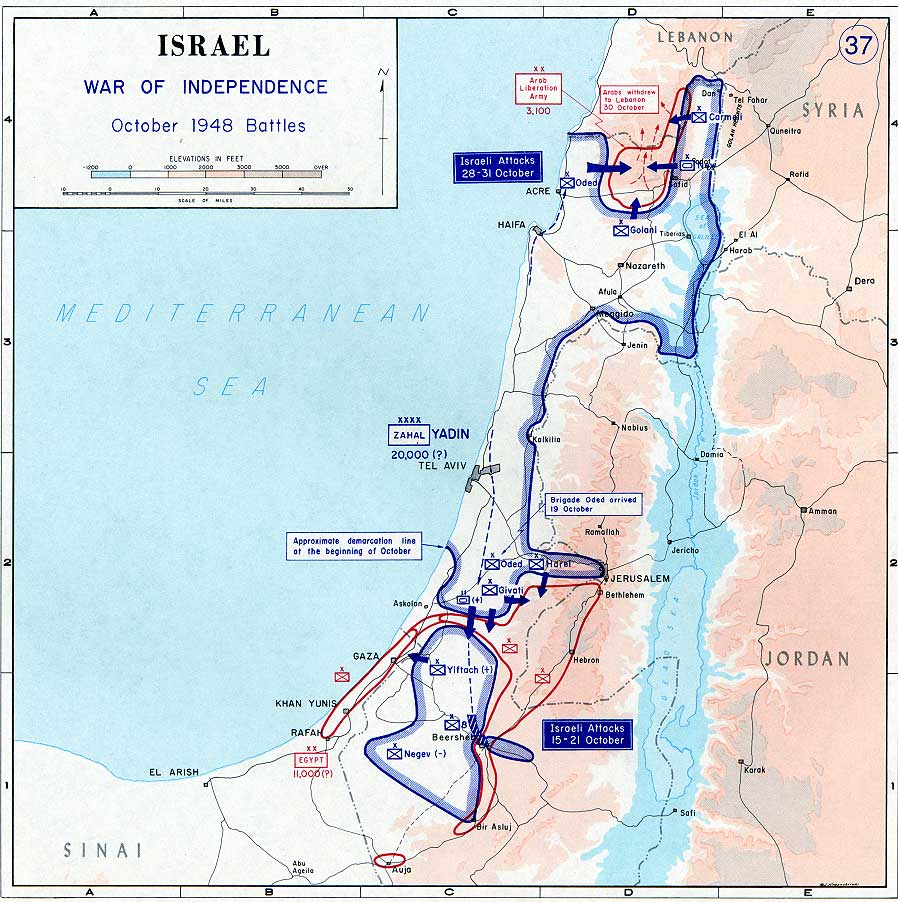
October battles

Israel launched a series of military operations to drive out the Arab armies and secure the northern and southern borders of Israel.

==== Northern front – Galilee ====
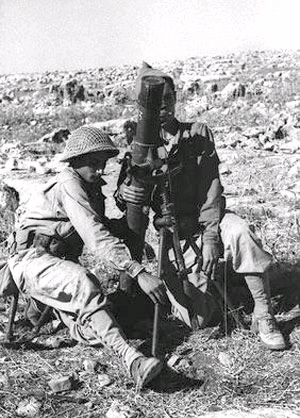
An Israeli mortar team outside Safsaf, October 1948

Israeli soldiers attack Sasa during Operation Hiram, October 1948

On 22 October, the third truce went into effect. Irregular Arab forces refused to recognise the truce, and continued to harass Israeli forces and settlements in the north. On the same day that the truce came into effect, the Arab Liberation Army violated the truce by attacking Manara, capturing the strongpoint of Sheikh Abed, repulsing counterattacks by local Israeli units, and ambushing Israeli forces attempting to relieve Manara. The IDF's Carmeli Brigade lost 33 dead and 40 wounded. Manara and Misgav Am were totally cut off, and Israel's protests at the UN failed to change the situation.

On 24 October, the IDF launched Operation Hiram and captured the entire upper Galilee area, driving the ALA back to Lebanon, and ambushing and destroying an entire Syrian battalion. The Israeli force of four infantry brigades was commanded by Moshe Carmel. The entire operation lasted just 60 hours, during which numerous villages were captured, often after locals or Arab forces put up resistance. Arab losses were estimated at 400 dead and 550 taken prisoner, with low Israeli casualties.

Some prisoners were reportedly executed by the Israeli forces. An estimated 50,000 Palestinian refugees fled into Lebanon, some of them fleeing ahead of the advancing forces, and some expelled from villages which had resisted, while the Arab inhabitants of those villages which had remained at peace were allowed to remain and became Israeli citizens. The villagers of Iqrit and Birim were persuaded to leave their homes by Israeli authorities, who promised them that they would be allowed to return. Israel eventually decided not to allow them to return, and offered them financial compensation, which they refused to accept.

At the end of the month, the IDF had captured the whole of Galilee, driven all ALA forces out of Israel, and had advanced 8 kilometres (5 miles) into Lebanon to the Litani River, occupying thirteen Lebanese villages. In the Lebanese village of Hula, two Israeli officers killed between 35 and 58 prisoners as retaliation for the Haifa Oil Refinery massacre. Both officers were later put on trial for their actions.

==== Negev ====
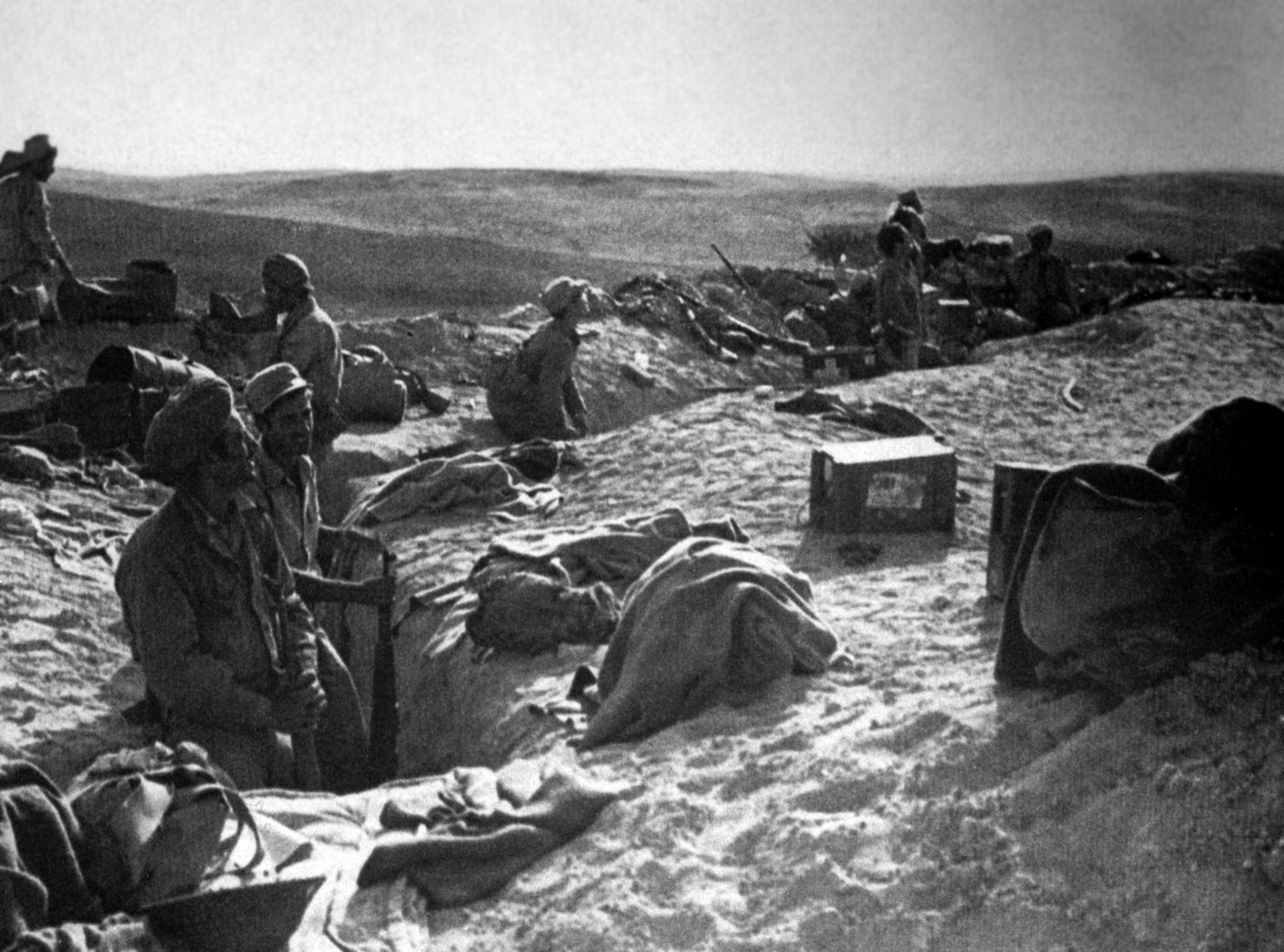
Israeli troops occupying abandoned Egyptian trenches at Huleiqat, October 1948

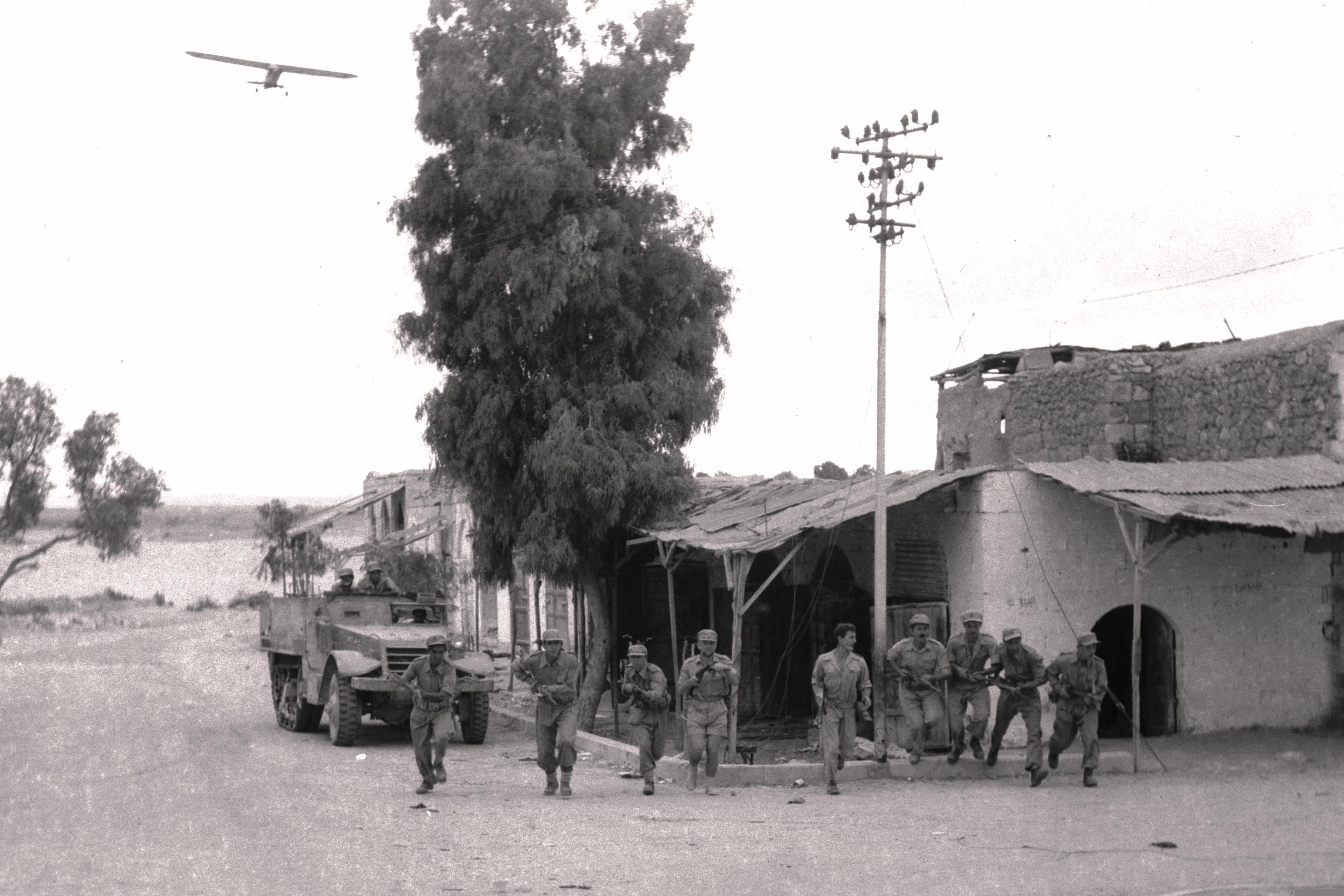
IDF forces in Beersheba during Operation Yoav

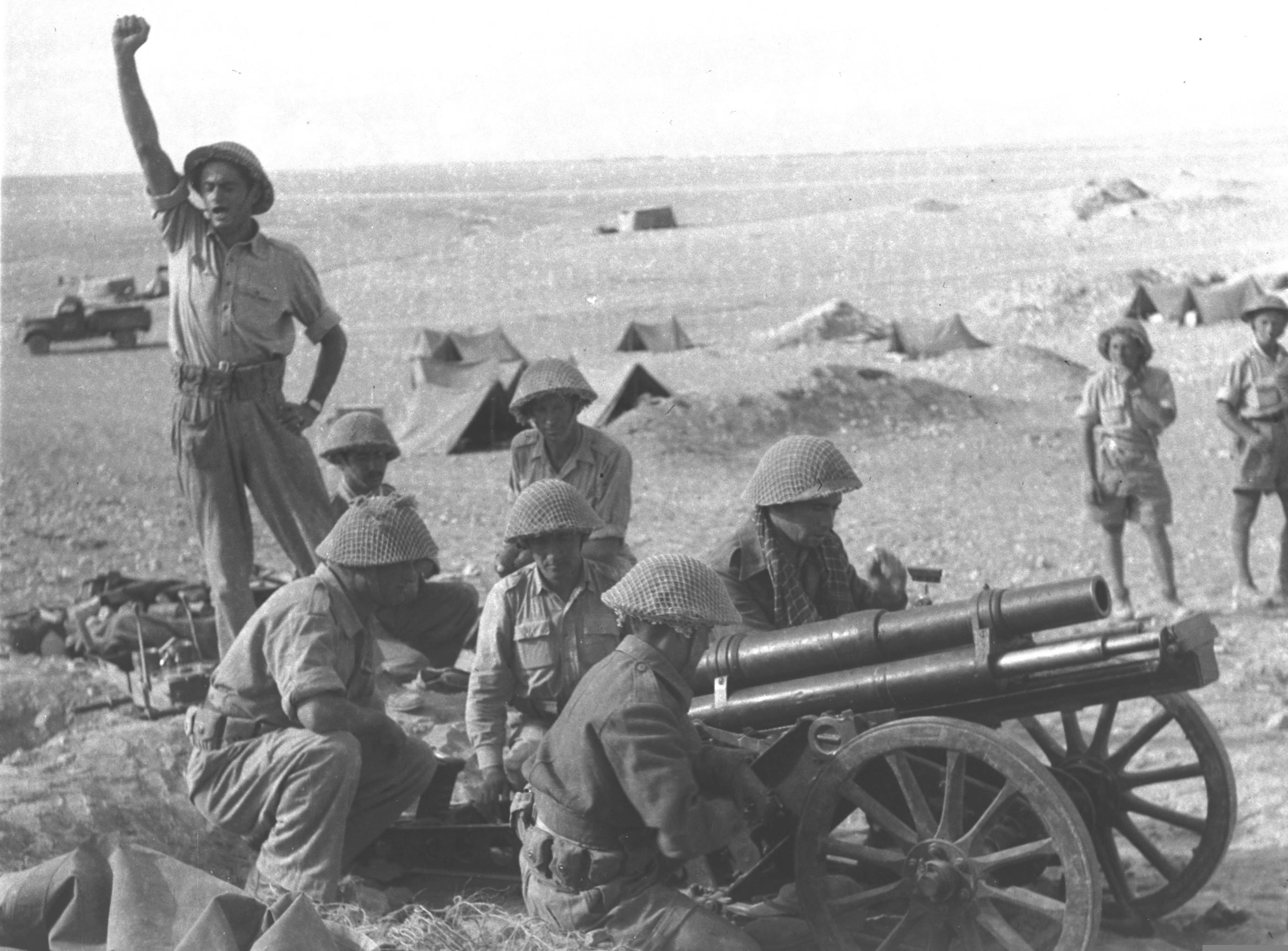
An IDF artillery unit in the Negev

IDF forces near Bayt Nattif, near Hebron, after it was captured. October 1948.

Israel launched a series of military operations to drive out the Arab armies and secure the borders of Israel. However, invading the West Bank might have brought into the borders of the expanding State of Israel a massive Arab population it could not absorb. The Negev desert was an empty space for expansion, so the main war effort shifted to Negev from early October. Israel decided to destroy or at least drive out the Egyptian expeditionary force since the Egyptian front lines were too vulnerable as permanent borders.

On 15 October, the IDF launched Operation Yoav in the northern Negev. Its goal was to drive a wedge between the Egyptian forces along the coast and the Beersheba-Hebron-Jerusalem road and ultimately to conquer the whole Negev. This was a special concern on the Israeli part because of a British diplomatic campaign to have the entire Negev handed over to Egypt and Jordan, and which thus made Ben-Gurion anxious to have Israeli forces in control of the Negev as soon as possible.

Operation Yoav was headed by the Southern Front commander Yigal Allon. Committed to Yoav were three infantry and one armoured brigades, who were given the task of breaking through the Egyptian lines. The Egyptian positions were badly weakened by the lack of a defence in depth, which meant that once the IDF had broken through the Egyptian lines, there was little to stop them. The operation was a huge success, shattering the Egyptian ranks and forcing the Egyptian Army from the northern Negev, Beersheba and Ashdod.

In the so-called "Faluja Pocket", an encircled Egyptian force was able to hold out for four months until the 1949 Armistice Agreements, when the village was peacefully transferred to Israel and the Egyptian troops left. Four warships of the Israeli Navy provided support by bombarding Egyptian shore installations in the Ashkelon area, and preventing the Egyptian Navy from evacuating retreating Egyptian troops by sea.

On 19 October, Operation Ha-Har began in the Jerusalem Corridor, while a naval battle also took place near Majdal, with three Israeli corvettes facing an Egyptian corvette with air support. An Israeli sailor was killed and four wounded, and two of the ships were damaged. One Egyptian plane was shot down, but the corvette escaped. Israeli naval vessels also shelled Majdal on 17 October, and Gaza on 21 October, with air support from the Israeli Air Force. The same day, the IDF captured Beersheba, and took 120 Egyptian soldiers prisoner. On 22 October, Israeli naval commandos using explosive boats sank the Egyptian flagship Emir Farouk, and damaged an Egyptian minesweeper.

On 9 November 1948, the IDF launched Operation Shmone to capture the Tegart fort in the village of Iraq Suwaydan. The fort's Egyptian defenders had previously repulsed eight attempts to take it, including two during Operation Yoav. Israeli forces bombarded the fort before an assault with artillery and airstrikes by B-17 bombers. After breaching the outlying fences without resistance, the Israelis blew a hole in the fort's outer wall, prompting the 180 Egyptian soldiers manning the fort to surrender without a fight. The defeat prompted the Egyptians to evacuate several nearby positions, including hills the IDF had failed to take by force. Meanwhile, IDF forces took Iraq Suwaydan itself after a fierce battle, losing 6 dead and 14 wounded.

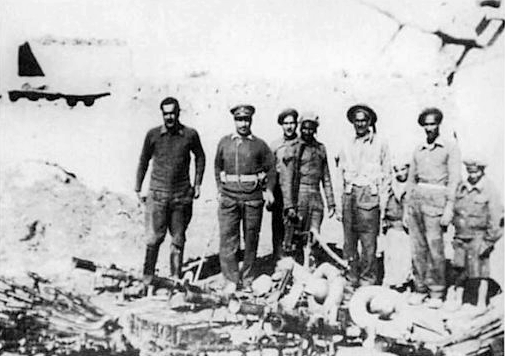
Egyptian soldiers in the Faluja pocket displaying captured Israeli weaponry. Future Egyptian President Gamal Abdel Nasser is first from left.

An Israeli convoy in the Negev during Operation Horev

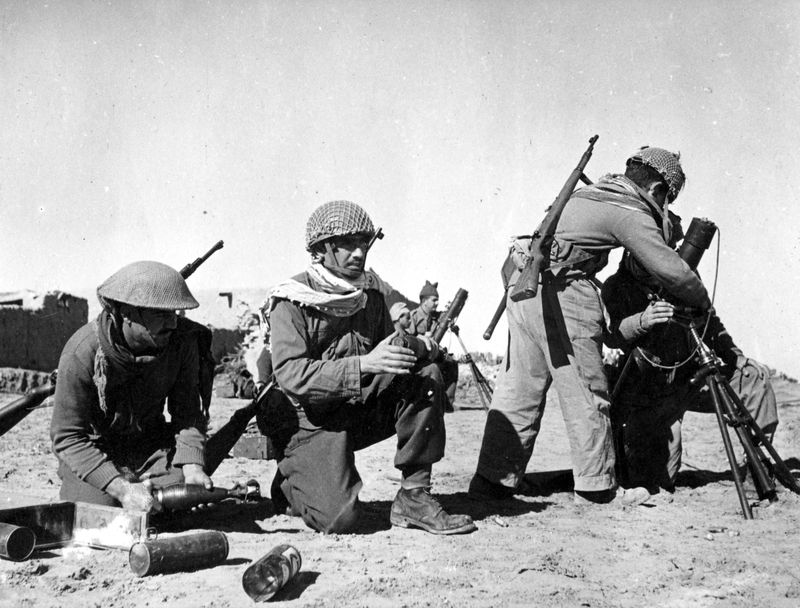
An Israeli mortar crew during Operation Horev

From 5 to 7 December, the IDF conducted Operation Assaf to take control of the Western Negev. The main assaults were spearheaded by mechanised forces, while Golani Brigade infantry covered the rear. An Egyptian counterattack was repulsed. The Egyptians planned another counterattack, but it failed after Israeli aerial reconnaissance revealed Egyptian preparations, and the Israelis launched a preemptive strike. About 100 Egyptians were killed, and 5 tanks were destroyed, with the Israelis losing 5 killed and 30 wounded. On 22 December, the IDF launched Operation Horev, also called Operation Ayin. The goal of the operation was to drive all remaining Egyptian forces from the Negev, destroying the Egyptian threat on Israel's southern communities and forcing the Egyptians into a ceasefire. During five days of fighting, the Israelis secured the Western Negev, expelling all Egyptian forces from the area.

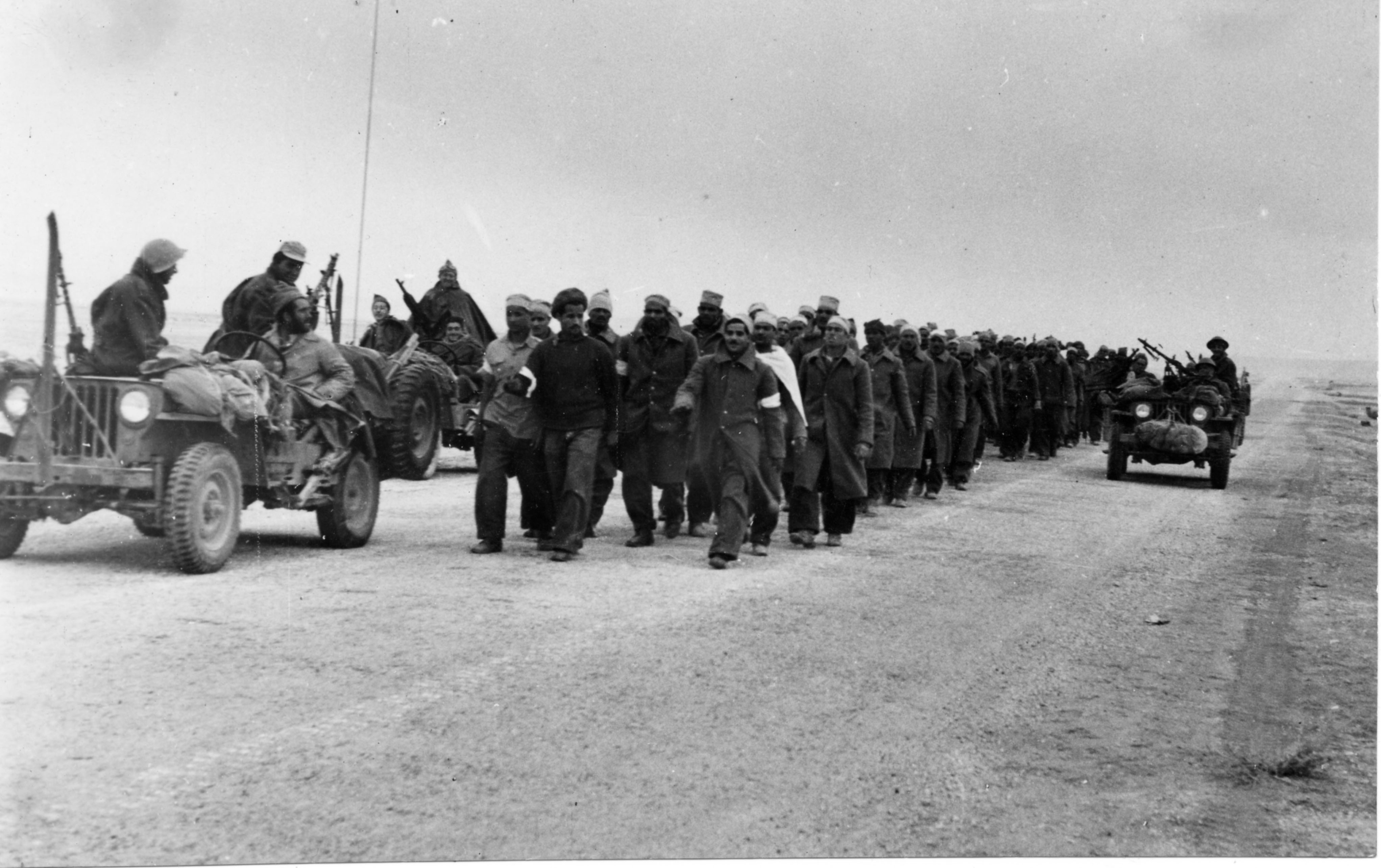
A column of Egyptian prisoners

Israeli forces subsequently launched raids into the Nitzana area, and entered the Sinai Peninsula on 28 December. The IDF captured Umm Katef and Abu Ageila, and advanced north towards Al Arish, with the goal of encircling the entire Egyptian expeditionary force. Israeli forces pulled out of the Sinai on 2 January 1949 following joint British-American pressure and a British threat of military action. IDF forces regrouped at the border with the Gaza Strip. Israeli forces attacked Rafah the following day, and after several days of fighting, Egyptian forces in the Gaza Strip were surrounded. The Egyptians agreed to negotiate a ceasefire on 7 January, and the IDF subsequently pulled out of Gaza. According to Morris, "the inequitable and unfair rules of engagement: the Arabs could launch offensives with impunity, but international interventions always hampered and restrained Israel's counterattacks."

On 28 December, the Alexandroni Brigade failed to take the Falluja Pocket, but managed to seize Iraq el-Manshiyeh and temporarily hold it. The Egyptians counterattacked, but were mistaken for a friendly force and allowed to advance, trapping a large number of men. The Israelis lost 87 soldiers.

On 5 March, Operation Uvda was launched following nearly a month of reconnaissance, with the goal of securing the Southern Negev from Jordan. The IDF entered and secured the territory, but did not meet significant resistance along the way, as the area was already designated to be part of the Jewish state in the UN Partition Plan, and the operation meant to establish Israeli sovereignty over the territory rather than actually conquer it. The Golani, Negev, and Alexandroni brigades participated in the operation, together with some smaller units and with naval support.

On 10 March, Israeli forces secured the Southern Negev, reaching the southern tip of Palestine: Umm Rashrash on the Red Sea (where Eilat was built later) and taking it without a battle. Israeli soldiers raised a hand-made Israeli flag ("The Ink Flag") at 16:00 on 10 March, claiming Umm Rashrash for Israel. The raising of the Ink Flag is considered to be the end of the war.

==== Anglo-Israeli air clashes ====
The funeral of a Royal Air Force pilot killed during a clash with the Israeli Air Force

As the fighting progressed and Israel mounted an incursion into the Sinai, the Royal Air Force began conducting almost daily reconnaissance missions over Israel and the Sinai. RAF reconnaissance aircraft took off from Egyptian airbases and sometimes flew alongside Royal Egyptian Air Force planes. High-flying British aircraft frequently flew over Haifa and Ramat David Airbase, and became known to the Israelis as the "shuftykeit".

On 20 November 1948, an unarmed RAF photo-reconnaissance De Havilland Mosquito of No. 13 Squadron RAF was shot down by an Israeli Air Force P-51 Mustang flown by American volunteer Wayne Peake as it flew over the Galilee towards Hatzor Airbase. Peake opened fire with his cannons, causing a fire to break out in the port engine. The aircraft turned to sea and lowered its altitude, then exploded and crashed off Ashdod. The pilot and navigator were both killed.

Just before noon on 7 January 1949, four Spitfire FR18s from No. 208 Squadron RAF on a reconnaissance mission in the Deir al-Balah area flew over an Israeli convoy that had been attacked by five Egyptian Spitfires fifteen minutes earlier. The pilots had spotted smoking vehicles and were drawn to the scene out of curiosity. Two planes dived to below 500 feet altitude to take pictures of the convoy, while the remaining two covered them from 1,500 feet.

Israeli soldiers on the ground, alerted by the sound of the approaching Spitfires and fearing another Egyptian air attack, opened fire with machine guns. One Spitfire was shot down by a tank-mounted machine gun, while the other was lightly damaged and rapidly pulled up. The remaining three Spitfires were then attacked by patrolling IAF Spitfires flown by Chalmers Goodlin and John McElroy, volunteers from the United States and Canada respectively. All three Spitfires were shot down, and one pilot was killed.

Two pilots were captured by Israeli soldiers and taken to Tel Aviv for interrogation, and were later released. Another was rescued by Bedouins and handed over to the Egyptian Army, which turned him over to the RAF. Later that day, four RAF Spitfires from the same squadron escorted by seven Hawker Tempests from No. 213 Squadron RAF and eight from No. 6 Squadron RAF went searching for the lost planes, and were attacked by four IAF Spitfires. The Israeli formation was led by Ezer Weizman. The remaining three were manned by Weizman's wingman Alex Jacobs and American volunteers Bill Schroeder and Caesar Dangott.

The Tempests found they could not jettison their external fuel tanks, and some had non-operational guns. Schroeder shot down a British Tempest, killing pilot David Tattersfield, and Weizman severely damaged a British plane flown by Douglas Liquorish. Weizman's plane and two other British aircraft suffered light damage during the engagement. During the battle, British Tempest pilots treated British Spitfires as potential Israeli aircraft until the British Spitfire pilots were told by radio to wiggle their wings to be more clearly identifiable. The engagement ended when the Israelis realised the danger of their situation and disengaged, returning to Hatzor Airbase.

Israeli prime minister David Ben-Gurion personally ordered the wrecks of the RAF fighters that had been shot down to be dragged into Israeli territory. Israeli troops subsequently visited the crash sites, removed various parts, and buried the other aircraft. However, the Israelis did not manage to conceal the wrecks in time to prevent British reconnaissance planes from photographing them. An RAF salvage team was deployed to recover the wrecks, entering Israeli territory during their search. Two were discovered inside Egypt, while Tattersfield's Tempest was found north of Nirim, 6 km (4 mi) inside Israel. Interviews with local Arabs confirmed that the Israelis had visited the crash sites to remove and bury the wrecks. Tattersfield was initially buried near the wreckage, but his body was later removed and reburied at the British War Cemetery in Ramla.

In response, the RAF readied all Tempests and Spitfires to attack any IAF aircraft they encountered and bomb IAF airfields. British troops in the Middle East were placed on high alert with all leave cancelled, and British citizens were advised to leave Israel. The Royal Navy was placed on high alert. At Hatzor Airbase, the general consensus among the pilots, most of whom had flown with or alongside the RAF during World War II, was that the RAF would not allow the loss of five aircraft and two pilots to go without retaliation, and would probably attack the base at dawn the next day. That night, in anticipation of an impending British attack, some pilots decided not to offer any resistance and left the base, while others prepared their Spitfires and were strapped into the cockpits at dawn, preparing to repel a retaliatory airstrike. However, despite pressure from the squadrons involved in the incidents, British commanders refused to authorise any retaliatory strikes.

The day following the incident, British pilots were issued a directive to regard any Israeli aircraft infiltrating Egyptian or Jordanian airspace as hostile and to shoot them down, but were also ordered to avoid activity close to Israel's borders. Later in January 1949, the British managed to prevent the delivery of aviation spirit and other essential fuels to Israel in retaliation for the incident. The British Foreign Office presented the Israeli government with a demand for compensation over the loss of personnel and equipment.

==== UN Resolution 194 ====
In December 1948, the UN General Assembly passed Resolution 194. It called to establish a UN Conciliation Commission to facilitate peace between Israel and Arab states. However, many of the resolution's articles were not fulfilled, since these were opposed by Israel, rejected by the Arab states, or were overshadowed by war as the 1948 conflict continued.

== Weapons ==
Both sides utilized weapons that had been used in World War II by the British and French forces. Egypt's arsenal included leftover British equipment, while the Syrian arsenal included leftover French weaponry. The Israeli Defense Forces utilized an array of British, American, French and Czechoslovak military equipment. In addition to the aforementioned, the IDF also used several Davidka mortars, which were a domestically produced weapon by Israel.

According to Amitzur Ilan, "Israel's ability to cope better with the embargo situation was, by far, her greatest strategic asset."

Type	Arab armies	IDF
Tanks	Matilda tanks, R-39s, FT-17s, R35s, Panzer IVs (dug in and used as stationary gun emplacements by Egypt), Fiat M13/40, Sherman M4, M-22, Vickers MK-6.	Cromwell tanks, H39s, M4 Sherman
APCs/IFVs	British World War II era trucks, Humber Mk III & IV, Automitrailleuses Dodge/Bich type, improvised armored cars/trucks, Marmon-Herrington Armoured Cars, Universal Carriers, Lloyd Towing Carriers	British World War II era trucks, improvised armored cars/trucks, White M3A1 Scout Cars, Daimler Armoured Cars, Universal Carriers, M3 Half-tracks, IHC M14 Half-tracks, M5 Half-tracks
Artillery	Mortars, 15 cm sIG33 auf Pz IIs, 25 mm anti-tank guns on Bren carriers, improvised self-propelled guns used by Syrians in 1948–49, 65 mm mountain guns on Lorraine 38L chenillettes, 2-pounder anti-tank guns, 6-pounder anti-tank guns	Mortars, 2-inch (51 mm) British mortars, 65 mm French howitzers (Napoleonchiks), 120 mm French mortars, Davidka mortars
Aircraft	Spitfires, T-6 Texans, C-47 Dakotas, Hawker Hurricanes, Avro Ansons	Spitfires, Avia S-199s, B-17 Flying Fortresses, P-51 Mustangs, C-47 Dakotas
Small Arms	Lee–Enfield rifles, Bren Guns, Sten guns, MAS 36s	Sten guns, Mills grenades, Karabiner 98k (Czech copies), Bren Guns, MP 40s, MG-34 Machine guns, Thompson submachine guns, Lee–Enfield rifles, Molotov cocktails, PIAT anti-tank infantry weapon

== Aftermath ==
=== 1949 Armistice Agreements ===
Boundaries defined in the 1947 UN Partition Plan for Palestine: Area assigned for a Jewish state Area assigned for an Arab state Planned Corpus separatum with the intention that Jerusalem would be neither Jewish nor Arab Armistice Demarcation Lines of 1949 (Green Line): Israel per 1949 armistice lines West Jerusalem and other areas under Israeli control from 1949 Gaza and the West Bank (including East Jerusalem) under Egyptian and Jordanian control till 1967

In 1949, Israel signed separate armistices with Egypt on 24 February, Lebanon on 23 March, Transjordan on 3 April, and Syria on 20 July. The Armistice Demarcation Lines, as set by the agreements, saw the territory under Israeli control encompassing approximately three-quarters of the prior British administered Mandate as it stood after Transjordan's independence in 1946. Israel controlled territories of about one-third more than was allocated to the Jewish State under the UN partition proposal. After the armistices, Israel had control over 78% of the territory of former Mandatory Palestine or some 21,000 km^{2} (8,000 sq mi), including the entire Galilee and Jezreel Valley in the north, the whole Negev in south, West Jerusalem and the coastal plain in the center.

The armistice lines were known afterwards as the "Green Line". The Gaza Strip and the West Bank (including East Jerusalem) were occupied by Egypt and Transjordan respectively. The United Nations Truce Supervision Organization and Mixed Armistice Commissions were set up to monitor ceasefires, supervise the armistice agreements, to prevent isolated incidents from escalating, and assist other UN peacekeeping operations in the region.

Just before the signing of the Israel-Transjordan armistice agreement, general Yigal Allon proposed a military offensive to conquer the West Bank up to the Jordan River as the natural, defensible border of the state. Ben-Gurion refused, although he was aware that the IDF was militarily strong enough to carry out the conquest. He feared the reaction of Western powers and wanted to maintain good relations with the United States and not to provoke the British. Moreover, the results of the war were already satisfactory and Israeli leaders had to build a state.

=== Casualties ===
Israel lost 6,373 of its people, about 1% of its population at the time, in the war. About 4,000 were soldiers and the rest were civilians.

The exact number of Arab casualties is unknown. One estimate places the Arab death toll at 7,000, including 3,000 Palestinians, 2,000 Egyptians, 1,000 Jordanians, and 1,000 Syrians. In 1958, Palestinian historian Aref al-Aref calculated that the Arab armies' combined losses amounted to 3,700, with Egypt losing 961 regular and 200 irregular soldiers and Transjordan losing 362 regulars and 200 irregulars. According to Henry Laurens, the Palestinians suffered double the Jewish losses, with 13,000 dead, 1,953 of whom are known to have died in combat situations. Of the remainder, 4,004 remain nameless but the place, tally and date of their death is known, and a further 7,043, for whom only the place of death is known, not their identities nor the date of their death. According to Laurens, the largest part of Palestinian casualties consisted of non-combatants and corresponds to the successful operations of the Israelis.

=== Demographic outcomes ===
==== Arabs ====
During the 1947–1948 civil war in Mandatory Palestine and the 1948 Arab–Israeli War that followed, around 750,000 Palestinian Arabs fled or were expelled from their homes, out of approximately 1,200,000 Arabs living in former British Mandate of Palestine, a displacement known to Palestinians as the Nakba. In 1951, the UN Conciliation Commission for Palestine estimated that the number of Palestinian refugees displaced from Israel was 711,000.

This number did not include displaced Palestinians inside Israeli-held territory. More than 400 Arab villages, and about ten Jewish villages and neighbourhoods, were depopulated during the Arab–Israeli conflict, most of them during 1948. According to estimate based on earlier census, the total Muslim population in Palestine was 1,143,336 in 1947. The causes of the 1948 Palestinian exodus are a controversial topic among historians. After the war, around 156,000 Arabs remained in Israel and became Israeli citizens.

Displaced Palestinian Arabs, known as Palestinian refugees, were settled in Palestinian refugee camps throughout the Arab world. The United Nations established UNRWA as a relief and human development agency tasked with providing humanitarian assistance to Palestinian refugees. Arab nations refused to absorb Palestinian refugees, instead keeping them in refugee camps while insisting that they be allowed to return.

Refugee status was also passed on to their descendants, who were also largely denied citizenship in Arab states, except in Transjordan. The Arab League instructed its members to deny Palestinians citizenship "to avoid dissolution of their identity and protect their right of return to their homeland." More than 1.4 million Palestinians still live in 58 recognised refugee camps, while more than 5 million Palestinians live outside Israel and the Palestinian territories.

Palestinian refugees and displaced persons and the lack of a Palestinian right of return remain major issues in the Arab–Israeli conflict.

==== Jews ====
In the three years from May 1948 to the end of 1951, 700,000 Jews settled in Israel, mainly along the borders and in former Arab lands, doubling the Jewish population there. Of these, upwards of 300,000 arrived from Asian and North African states. Among them, the largest group, over 100,000, was from Iraq. The remaining came mostly from Europe, including 136,000 from the 250,000 displaced Jews of World War II living in refugee camps and urban centers in Germany, Austria, and Italy, and more than 270,000 coming from Eastern Europe, mainly Romania and Poland, over 100,000 each.

On the establishment of the state, a top priority was given to a policy for the "ingathering of exiles", and the Mossad LeAliyah Bet gave key assistance to the Jewish Agency to organise immigrants from Europe and the Middle East, and arrange for their transport to Israel. For Ben-Gurion, a fundamental defect of the State was that "it lacked Jews".

Jewish immigrants from Arab and Muslim countries left for numerous reasons. The war's outcome had exacerbated Arab hostilities to local Jewish communities. News of the victory aroused messianic expectations in Libya and Yemen; Zionism had taken root in many countries; active incentives for making aliyah formed a key part of Israeli policy; and better economic prospects and security were to be expected from a Jewish state.

Some Arab governments, Egypt, for example, held their Jewish communities hostage at times. Persecution, political instability, and news of a number of violent pogroms also played a role. Some 800,000–1,000,000 Jews eventually left the Arab world over the next three decades as a result of these various factors. An estimated 650,000 of the departees settled in Israel.

Israeli historian Benny Morris wrote that "the experience of discrimination and persecution in the Arab world, and the centuries of subjection and humiliation that preceded 1948 ... [left] a deep dislike, indeed hatred, of that world among [first generation Mizrahim] and their descendants." He states this has consequences in the Israeli political realm both in terms of negative views of Arabs and "hard-line, right-wing voting patterns." In his view these are a long lasting indirect consequence of the war.

== Historiography ==
Since the war, different historiographical traditions have interpreted the events of 1948 differently; in the words of the New Historian Avi Shlaim, "each side subscribes to a different version of events." In the Israeli narrative, the war is Israel's War of Independence. In the Palestinian narrative, the War of 1948 is inextricable from the Nakba, the Zionist movement is one of settler colonialism, and the Israelis are seen as conquerors and the Palestinians as victims. The different narratives of 1948 reflect these different perceptions.

An issue affecting the historiography of 1948 is access to sources and archives, which may have been destroyed, appropriated, censored, or otherwise made unavailable to some or all researchers. Linguistic barriers represent another hurdle, as most research is published exclusively in the author's native language and is not translated.

The historiography of 1948 is tied to political legitimacy in the present and has implications for the Israeli–Palestinian conflict. According to Avraham Sela and Neil Caplan:

A major reason for this grip of the past over the present is the unfulfilled quest of both Israelis and Palestinians for legitimacy, in one or more of the following three senses: (a) each party's sense of its own legitimacy as a national community entitled to its own sovereign state; (b) each party's willingness to grant legitimacy to at least part of the competing national narrative of the other; and (c) the international community's extension of legitimacy to the competing rights and claims of Israelis and Palestinians.

The narratives of 1948 have also had implications for Palestinian refugees.

=== Israeli narratives ===
The Israelis, whether or not they were conquerors, were irrefutably the victors of the war, and for this reason among others, "they were able to propagate more effectively than their opponents their version of this fateful war." Only in 1987 was that narrative effectively challenged outside the Arab world.

==== Zionist narrative ====
Avi Shlaim gives the conventional Zionist narrative or the "old history" of the 1948 war as follows:

The conflict between Jews and Arabs in Palestine came to a head following the passage, on 29 November 1947, of the United Nations partition resolution that called for the establishment of two states, one Jewish and one Arab. The Jews accepted the U.N. plan despite the painful sacrifices it entailed, but the Palestinians, the neighboring Arab states, and the Arab League rejected it. Great Britain did everything in its power toward the end of the Palestine Mandate to frustrate the establishment of the Jewish state envisaged in the UN plan. With the expiry of the Mandate and the proclamation of the State of Israel, seven Arab states sent their armies into Palestine with the firm intention of strangling the Jewish state at birth. The subsequent struggle was an unequal one between a Jewish David and an Arab Goliath. The infant Jewish state fought a desperate, heroic, and ultimately successful battle for survival against overwhelming odds. During the war, hundreds of thousands of Palestinians fled to the neighboring Arab states, mainly in response to orders from their leaders and despite Jewish pleas to stay and demonstrate that peaceful coexistence was possible. After the war, the story continues, Israeli leaders sought peace with all their heart and all their might but there was no one to talk to on the other side. Arab intransigence was alone responsible for the political deadlock, which was not broken until President Anwar Sadat's visit to Jerusalem thirty years later.

According to Shlaim, this narrative is "not history in the proper sense of the word," as most of the literature on the war was produced – not by professional academic historians – but rather by participants in the war, politicians, soldiers, and state-sponsored historians, as well as by sympathetic journalists, chroniclers, and biographers. It also portrays Israelis as morally superior, lacks political analysis, and gives undue weight to "the heroic feats of the Israeli fighters." This nationalist narrative was taught in Israeli schools and used for gaining legitimacy internationally.

==== New Historians ====
The standard Zionist narrative of the war remained unchallenged outside the Arab world until the war's fortieth anniversary, when a number of critical books came out, including Simha Flapan's The Birth of Israel: Myths and Realities (1987), Benny Morris's The Birth of the Palestinian Refugee Problem (1987), Ilan Pappé's Britain and the Arab-Israeli Conflict, 1948–51 (1988), and Shlaim's Collusion Across the Jordan: King Abdullah, the Zionist Movement and the Partition of Palestine (1988). These writers came to be known as New Historians or "post-Zionists".

According to Shlaim, the new historians disagreed with the Zionist narrative on six main points: British policy with regard to the Yishuv at the end of the Palestine Mandate, the military balance in 1948, the origins of the Palestinian refugee problem, the nature of relations between Israelis and Jordanians during the war, Arab aims in the war, and the reasons peace remained elusive after the war.

Among their most vitriolic critics was Shabtai Teveth, biographer of David Ben-Gurion, who published "The New Historians", a series of four weekly full-page articles attacking the new historians, in Haaretz May 1989. Teveth claimed that the new historiography was flawed in its practice and that it was politically motived, that it was pro-Palestinian and aimed to delegitimize the State of Israel.

==== Neo-Zionist narratives ====
Ilan Pappé identifies a turn in predominant Israeli narratives about 1948 in September 2000. In the climate of the Second Intifada and in the Post-9/11 period, "not only were Israel's brutal military operations against the Palestinians during the new intifada seen as justified, but so was their systematic expulsion in 1948." Evidence of the expulsions, massacres, and war crimes of 1948 brought to light by the New Historians could no longer be ignored, but writers of what Pappé calls a "neo-Zionist" narrative justified these as necessary or unavoidable.

In this period, the focus of Israeli historical writing on 1948 shifted largely from its human impact back to its military aspects. Neo-Zionist writers were given selective access to top-secret material, to which writers critical of Zionism would not have been given access, and much of their work was published by the Israeli Ministry of Defense.

Among those Pappé associated with the neo-Zionist perspective were Benny Morris (who had become more outspokenly defensive of Zionism by this time), Daniel Gutwein, Mordechai Bar-On, Yoav Gelber, Tamir Goren, Arnon Golan, Alon Kadish, and Yoav Peleg, as well as the journal Techelet .

=== Palestinian narratives ===
Unlike Israeli narratives that shifted over the decades, Palestinian narratives of 1948 have been more or less constant, focusing on Palestinians' indigenous rights to Palestine, Palestinian victimhood, dispossession, displacement, exile, statelessness, and more "unrequited grievances against colonialism and Zionism." The term 'Nakba' to describe the Palestinian catastrophe in the war of 1948 was coined in Constantin Zureiq's 1948 book Ma'na an-Nakba. Aref al-Aref wrote a six volume work titled an-Nakba that was published in Arabic in the 1950s.

Palestinian narratives have focused on countering the dominant Zionist narrative; the preeminent Palestinian historian of 1948 Walid Khalidi has dedicated much of his career to disproving the official Israeli narrative that the 1948 Palestinian expulsion and flight was voluntary.

Rashid Khalidi and other historians hold that "there is no established, authoritative Palestinian master narrative." They attribute this to, among other reasons, the dispersed and fragmented state of the Palestinian community and the loss, destruction, or appropriation by Israel of relevant documents and libraries. Without access to much in the way of archival materials, Palestinian historians have made use of oral history.

=== Arab narratives ===
In the narratives of the wider Arab-Muslim world, 1948 is seen as an "Arab debacle", representative of the region's social and political decline from its "glorious distant past". The official narratives of Arab states on 1948 tended to be apologetic with the goal of defending their political legitimacy, while the Arab nationalists wrote with a focus on distilling and extracting historical lessons to galvanize Arab society, politics, and ideology in preparation for the next conflict with Israel – neither approach bridled itself too much with historical accuracy.

=== Western narratives ===
==== In the United States ====
The American journalist Joan Peters' 1984 book From Time Immemorial had a massive impact on how 1948 was understood in popular and political narratives in the United States.

Ilan Pappé asserts the neo-Zionist narrative was pushed in the United States most passionately by Michael Walzer, and by Anita Shapira and Derek Penslar with their 2003 Israeli Historical Revisionism: From Left to Right.

== In popular culture ==
- In 1948, the Egyptian film A Girl from Palestine tells the story of an Egyptian fighter pilot.
- A 2015 PBS documentary, A Wing and a Prayer, depicts the Al Schwimmer–led airborne smuggling missions to arm Israel.

== See also ==
- List of battles and operations in the 1948 Palestine war
- List of modern conflicts in the Middle East
- List of wars involving Israel

== Bibliography ==
=== Works by involved parties ===
- Dunkelman, Ben (1976) Dual Allegiance: An Autobiography. Macmillan Company of Canada, Toronto. ISBN 978-0-7705-1429-7
- Joseph, Dov (1960). The Faithful City: The Siege of Jerusalem, 1948. Simon and Schuster. LCCN 60-10976. OCLC 266413.
- Kagan, Benjamin (1966) The Secret Battle for Israel. World Publishing, Cleveland. LCCN 66-24991
- Lorch, Netanel (1961) The Edge of the Sword: Israel's War of Independence, 1947–1949. New York, London: G. P. Putnam's Sons LCCN 61-8345

=== Secondary sources ===
- Adrian, Nathan (2004). Britain, Israel and Anglo-Jewry 1949–57. Routledge
- Aloni, Shlomo (2001). Arab-Israeli Air Wars 1947–82. Osprey Publishing. ISBN 978-1-84176-294-4
- Beckman, Morris (1999). The Jewish Brigade: An Army With Two Masters, 1944–45. Sarpedon Publishers. ISBN 978-1-86227-423-5
- Beker, A. (2005). "The Forgotten Narrative: Jewish Refugees From Arab Countries". Jewish Political Studies Review. 17 (3/4): 3–19. JSTOR 25834637.
- Ben-Ami, Shlomo (2006). Scars of War, Wounds of Peace: The Israeli-Arab Tragedy. Oxford University Press. ISBN 978-0-19-518158-6
- Benvenisti, Meron (2002). Sacred Landscape. University of California Press. ISBN 978-0-520-23422-2
- Bercuson, David (1983). The Secret Army. Stein and Day, New York. ISBN 978-0-8128-2984-6
- Bickerton, Ian and Hill, Maria (2003). Contested Spaces: The Arab-Israeli Conflict. McGraw-Hill. ISBN 978-0-07-471217-7
- Black, Ian (1992). Israel's Secret Wars: A History of Israel's Intelligence Services. Grove Press. ISBN 978-0-8021-3286-4
- Bowyer Bell, John (1996). Terror Out of Zion: The Fight For Israeli Independence. Transaction Publishers. ISBN 978-1-56000-870-5
- Bregman, Ahron (2002). Israel's Wars: A History Since 1947. London: Routledge. ISBN 978-0-415-28716-6
- Cragg, Kenneth. Palestine. The Prize and Price of Zion. Cassel, 1997. ISBN 978-0-304-70075-2
- Van Creveld, Martin (2004). Moshe Dayan. Weidenfeld & Nicolson. ISBN 978-0-297-84669-7
- Collins, Larry and Lapierre, Dominique (1973). O Jerusalem!, Pan Books. ISBN 978-0-330-23514-3
- El-Nawawy, Mohammed (2002), The Israeli-Egyptian Peace Process in the Reporting of Western Journalists, Ablex/Greenwood, ISBN 978-1-56750-544-3
- Flapan, Simha (1987), The Birth of Israel: Myths and Realities, Pantheon Books, New York.
- Geddes, Charles L. (1991). A Documentary History of the Arab-Israeli Conflict. Praeger. ISBN 978-0-275-93858-1
- Gelber, Yoav (1997). Jewish-Transjordanian Relations 1921–48: Alliance of Bars Sinister. London: Routledge. ISBN 978-0-7146-4675-6
- Gelber, Yoav (2004). Israeli-Jordanian Dialogue, 1948–1953: Cooperation, Conspiracy, or Collusion?. Sussex Academic Press.
- Gelber, Yoav (2004) "Independence Versus Nakba"; Kinneret Zmora-Bitan Dvir Publishing, ISBN 978-965-517-190-7
- Gelber, Yoav (2006). Palestine 1948. War, Escape and the Emergence of the Palestinian Refugee Problem. Sussex Academic Press. ISBN 978-1-84519-075-0
- Gershoni, Haim (1989). Israel: The Way it was. Associated University Presses.
- Gilbert, Martin (1998). Israel: A History Archived 27 October 2022 at the Wayback Machine. Black Swan. ISBN 978-0-552-99545-0
- Gilbert, Martin (1976). The Arab-Israeli Conflict: Its History in Maps Weidenfeld & Nicolson. ISBN 978-0-297-77241-5
- Gold, Dore (2007), The Fight for Jerusalem: Radical Islam, the West, and the Future of the Holy City, Regnery Publishing, ISBN 978-1-59698-029-7
- Israel Foreign Ministry, Foreign Ministry of the Russian Federation, Israel State Archives, Russian Federal Archives, Cummings Center for Russian Studies Tel Aviv University, Oriental Institute (2000). Documents on Israeli Soviet Relations, 1941–53. London: Routledge. ISBN 978-0-7146-4843-9
- Kaniuk, Yoram (2001). Commander of the Exodus. Grove Press. ISBN 978-0-8021-3808-8
- Karsh, Efraim (2002), The Arab-Israeli Conflict. The Palestine War 1948, Osprey, ISBN 978-1-84176-372-9
- Fischbach, Michael R. 'Land'. In Philip Mattar (ed.) Encyclopedia of the Palestinians, Infobase Publishing. 2005. pp. 291–298
- Heller, Joseph. The Birth of Israel, 1945–1949: Ben-Gurion and His Critics, University Press of Florida, 2001
- Katz, Sam (1988). Israeli Units Since 1948. Osprey Publishing. ISBN 978-0-85045-837-4
- Khalaf, Issa Politics in Palestine: Arab Factionalism and Social Disintegration, 1939–1948. SUNY Press, 1991
- Khalidi, Rashid (2001). "The Palestinians and 1948: the underlying causes of failure." In Eugene Rogan and Avi Shlaim (eds.). The War for Palestine (pp. 12–36). Cambridge: Cambridge University Press. ISBN 978-0-521-79476-3
- Khalidi, Rashid (2006). The Iron Cage:The Story of the Palestinian Struggle for Statehood. Boston: Beacon Press. ISBN 978-0-8070-0309-1
- Khalidi, Walid (1987). From Haven to Conquest: Readings in Zionism and the Palestine Problem Until 1948. Institute for Palestine Studies. ISBN 978-0-88728-155-6
- Khalidi, Walid (ed.) (1992). All that remains. Institute for Palestine Studies. ISBN 978-0-88728-224-9
- Krämer, Gudrun, A History of Palestine: From the Ottoman Conquest to the Founding of the State of Israel, Princeton UP 2011.
- Krammer, Arnold. (1974). The Forgotten Friendship: Israel and the Soviet Bloc 1947–53. University of Illinois Press, Urbana. ISBN 978-0-252-00396-7
- Kurzman, Dan (1970). Genesis 1948 – the first Arab-Israeli war. New York: New American Library. LCCN 77-96925.
- Landis, Joshua. "Syria and the Palestine War: fighting King 'Abdullah's 'Greater Syria plan.'" Rogan and Shlaim. The War for Palestine. 178–205.
- Levenberg, Haim (1993). Military Preparations of the Arab Community in Palestine: 1945–1948. London: Routledge. ISBN 978-0-7146-3439-5
- Levin, Harry. Jerusalem Embattled – A Diary of the City under Siege. Cassels, 1997. ISBN 978-0-304-33765-1
- Lockman, Zachary. Comrades and Enemies: Arab and Jewish Workers in Palestine, 1906–1948. University of California Press, 1996
- Makdisi Saree, Palestine Inside Out: An Everyday Occupation, W.W. Norton & Company 2010
- Masalha, Nur (1992). Expulsion of the Palestinians: The Concept of 'Transfer' in Zionist Political Thought, 1882–1948, Institute for Palestine Studies, ISBN 978-0-88728-235-5
- Morris, Benny (1988), The Birth of the Palestinian Refugee Problem, 1947–1949, Cambridge Middle East Library
- Morris, Benny (1994), 1948 and after; Israel and the Palestinians
- Morris, Benny (2001). Righteous Victims: A History of the Zionist-Arab Conflict, 1881–2001. Vintage Books. ISBN 978-0-679-74475-7
- Morris, Benny (2004), The Birth of the Palestinian Refugee Problem Revisited, Cambridge University Press, Cambridge, UK, ISBN 978-0-521-81120-0
- Morris, Benny (2008). 1948: The First Arab-Israeli War. New Haven: Yale University Press. ISBN 978-0-300-12696-9.
- Oring, Elliott (1981). Israeli Humor – The Content: The Content and Structure of the Chizbat of the Palmah. SUNY Press. ISBN 978-0-87395-512-6
- Pappe, Ilan (2006), The Ethnic Cleansing of Palestine, Oneworld Publications, Oxford, England, ISBN 978-1-85168-467-0
- Pollack, Kenneth Michael (2004). Arabs at War: Military Effectiveness, 1948–1991. Lincoln: University of Nebraska Press. ISBN 978-0-8032-0686-1. Archived from the original on 20 March 2023.
- Reiter, Yitzhak, "National Minority, Regional Majority: Palestinian Arabs Versus Jews in Israel" (Syracuse Studies on Peace and Conflict Resolution), (2009) Syracuse Univ Press (Sd). ISBN 978-0-8156-3230-6
- Rogan, Eugene L. and Avi Shlaim, eds. The War for Palestine: Rewriting the History of 1948. Cambridge: Cambridge UP, 2001
- Rogan, Eugene L. and Avi Shlaim, eds. The War for Palestine: Rewriting the History of 1948. 2nd ed. Cambridge: Cambridge UP, 2007
- Rogan, Eugene L. "Jordan and 1948: the persistence of an official history." Rogan and Shlaim. The War for Palestine. pp. 104–124
- Sadeh, Eligar (1997). Militarization and State Power in the Arab-Israeli Conflict: Case Study of Israel, 1948–1982. Universal Publishers. ISBN 978-0-9658564-6-1
- Sachar, Howard M. (1979). A History of Israel, New York: Knopf. ISBN 978-0-679-76563-9
- Sayigh, Yezid (2000). Armed Struggle and the Search for State: The Palestinian National Movement, 1949–1993. Oxford: Oxford University Press. ISBN 978-0-19-829643-0
- Sela, Avraham. "Abdallah Ibn Hussein." The Continuum Political Encyclopedia of the Middle East. Ed. Avraham Sela. New York: Continuum, 2002. pp. 13–14.
- Shapira, Anita (1992). Land and Power: Zionist Resort to Force, 1881–1948. Oxford University Press. ISBN 978-0-19-506104-8
- Sheleg, Yair (2001). "A Short History of Terror" Haaretz.
- Shlaim, Avi (2001). "Israel and the Arab Coalition." In Eugene Rogan and Avi Shlaim (eds.). The War for Palestine (pp. 79–103). Cambridge: Cambridge University Press. ISBN 978-0-521-79476-3
- Slater, Leonard (1970). The Pledge. Simon and Schuster, New York. LCCN 79--10188
- Stearns, Peter N. Citation from The Encyclopedia of World History 6th ed., Peter N. Stearns (general editor), 2001 Houghton Mifflin Company, at Bartleby.com.
- Tripp, Charles. "Iraq and the 1948 War: mirror of Iraq's disorder." in Rogan and Shlaim. The War for Palestine. pp. 125–150.
- Zertal, Idith (2005). Israel's Holocaust and the Politics of Nationhood. Cambridge: Cambridge University Press. ISBN 978-0-521-85096-4

=== Ancillary works ===
- Brown, Judith M. and Louis, Wm. Roger (1999). The Oxford History of the British Empire. Oxford: Oxford University Press. ISBN 978-0-19-820564-7
- Flint, Colin. Introduction to Geopolitics, Routledge 2012
- Karsh, Inari & Karsh, Efraim (1999). Empires of the Sand: The Struggle for Mastery in the Middle East, 1789–1923. Harvard University Press. ISBN 978-0-674-00541-9
- Penkower, Monty Noam (2002). Decision on Palestine Deferred: America, Britain and Wartime Diplomacy, 1939–1945. London: Routledge. ISBN 978-0-7146-5268-9
- Oren, Michael, Six Days of War, Random House Ballantine Publishing Group, New York, 2003, ISBN 978-0-345-46192-6
- Richelson, Jeffrey T. (1997). A Century of Spies: Intelligence in the Twentieth Century. Oxford: Oxford University Press. ISBN 978-0-19-511390-7
- Sicker, Martin (1999). Reshaping Palestine: From Muhammad Ali to the British Mandate, 1831–1922. Praeger/Greenwood. ISBN 978-0-275-96639-3
