= Battles of the Separation Corridor =

Series of engagements during the 1948 Arab–Israeli War

The Battles of the Separation Corridor (Hebrew: קְרָבוֹת רְצוּעַת הַנִּתּוּק, Kravot Retzu'at HaNituk) were a series of military engagements between the Israel Defense Forces and the Egyptian army in Operation Yoav, and were the centerpiece of the operation. They took place throughout all of Yoav (October 15–22, 1948), in the strip of land between the Israeli-held Negev enclave and the rest of the country. This area is generally called the Separation Strip in Hebrew.

The battles saw the Israelis set up a permanent land connection with the enclave through the Junction (Hebrew: הַצֹּמֶת, HaTzomet, a strategic crossroads west of Negba), Kawkaba and Huleiqat. A wedge was set up at Khirbet Masara (between Fallujah and Bayt Jibrin), in accordance with Operation Yoav's strategy to create wedges to cut off large Egyptian units, however, the wedge was unsuccessful and the Egyptians bypassed it. Attacks on other positions in the corridor, including the Iraq Suwaydan police fort, were also unsuccessful.

The battles, having opened a safe supply route to the Negev, had both political and military significance. It strengthened the Israeli claim to the whole Negev Desert and allowed for much of Israel's conquest in Operation Horev and Operation Uvda in December 1948 – March 1949.

== Background ==
The second truce of the 1948 Arab–Israeli War started on July 18, 1948, with an Israeli enclave in the Negev disconnected from the rest of the country. Military operations, including An-Far, Death to the Invader and GYS, to create a corridor between the two areas, failed. The United Nations mediator Folke Bernadotte's second plan for Palestine became known on September 20, days after Bernadotte was assassinated by the Lehi. This plan envisioned the Israeli Negev enclave to be handed over to the Arab side.

Israel's military options were pondered by its leadership during the second truce, and the Bernadotte Plan prompted the government and army to decide to concentrate the next effort on the southern front. The Operation, codenamed The Ten Plagues, was meant to open a permanent ground connection to the Negev, and gradually encircle the Egyptian forces in the Majdal – Bayt Jibrin corridor by creating wedges that would deny the Egyptians free movement between their main troop concentrations. This was the approach favored by Yigal Allon, head of the Southern Command, which mostly won over the General Staff's proposals to directly assault the large Egyptian concentrations.

The Junction was an important crossroads between the Majdal – Bayt Jibrin road and the internal Negev road. It was overlooked by kibbutz Negba, the Iraq Suwaydan police fort, and Hills 100, 103 and 113.

== Khirbet Masara wedge ==
On the night of October 15–16, Israeli forces from the Givati Brigade's 53rd Battalion occupied the site of Khirbet Masara and the adjacent Hill 224.9, positions on the road connecting Iraq al-Manshiyya to Bayt Jibrin. On October 17, the site of Khirbet 'Atalla to the northeast was also taken. However, as in the case of the Beit Hanoun wedge, this did not stop the Egyptians from moving from Fallujah and Iraq al-Manshiyya to Bayt Jibrin and Hebron, as they created an alternate path south of the wedge, through Qubeiba. However, the wedge served as a staging point for further Israeli territorial gains, eventually leading to the isolation of Fallujah and Iraq al-Manshiyya in what became known as the Fallujah Pocket.

== Battle of Iraq al-Manshiyya ==
The plan of Operation Yoav called for the creation of a permanent land corridor to the Negev through Iraq al-Manshiyya. The attack was meant to be carried out on October 17, 1948. It was, however, brought forward 24 hours to October 16 after a recommendation by Yitzhak Sadeh, commander of the 8th Armored Brigade. The attack would mark the first time that tanks would be used by Israel in the southern front. The Israelis hoped that Egypt would concentrate its main defenses in Fallujah, the locality that overlooked the vital Junction position, and therefore leave Iraq al-Manshiyya lightly defended. The village's two main positions were a tell just north, and the village school.

At 06:20, the Israeli artillery began its barrage, and at 07:00, the Israeli tanks (Cromwell and Hotchkiss of the 82nd Battalion) set out to assist the infantry (Negev Brigade's 7th Battalion), which had already left their bases. At 07:40, the infantry reached the school and a report came in that the village itself was being abandoned. What followed was complete chaos on the Israeli side; a Cromwell tank broke down, a Hotchkiss tank drove into a trap, and others ran out of ammunition. As other tanks broke down, more were needed to take them back for repair. There was no clear communication between the infantry and armored forces, and in different sectors, infantry and armor acted separately.

When the unit attacking the school retreated, the one that was on its way to the tell suffered a severe morale blow. As the Egyptians opened fire from previously unknown positions, it completely surprised the Israelis who had about a third of their force killed or wounded. After the armored forces were all out of the fight, an order was given to withdraw. Only 15 soldiers made it back to the starting positions. Rescue efforts to return the wounded still in the field continued throughout the day. In all, the Israeli forces suffered over 100 casualties and four tanks were destroyed.

== Capturing the Junction ==
After the failure to open up a permanent land corridor to the Negev through Iraq al-Manshiyya, the head of the Southern Command, Yigal Allon, decided to shift the major efforts to the west. On the night of October 16–17, the Givati Brigade's 51st Battalion set out from Julis to capture the Junction. It moved in three separate prongs—the 2nd Company in the west, the 3rd in the center and the 4th in the east. Another force set out from Negba to intercept possible Egyptian reinforcements from Iraq Suwaydan. The Egyptian forces in the area consisted of one battalion spread out through the hills north of the Junction, the Junction itself, and the positions of Kawkab and Huleiqat.

At 21:15, the 2nd Company noticed movement near the location on the road where it was supposed to set up its own blocking force to intercept reinforcements. It turned east and set up its block closer to the Junction. At 21:20, the Israelis began shelling hills 100, 103 and 113, just northwest of the junction, with 3" (81 mm) mortars. Meanwhile, an Egyptian Bren carrier ran into a mine on the eastern roadblock, killing the local Egyptian commander. At 22:50, Hill 103 was taken without resistance by the 4th Company, which proceeded to link up to the 3rd Company attacking Hill 113. Hills 100 and 113, joined by Egypt into one position, were captured by the two companies on October 17 at 01:15.

The Junction consisted of two major positions—one in the southwest and one in the northwest. The 2nd Company's commander decided to mount an assault on the southern position and at the same set up a roadblock just south. During the attack, communication with other Israeli forces was lost. Two soldiers were sent to the Israeli-held Hill 105 to renew it. Jeuda Wallach, the commander of the 51st Battalion, moved his HQ to Hill 113. The Givati forces took the southern position, and the Egyptians from the northern position counterattacked. The attack lasted 3 hours, during which the Israeli company commander recalled the force blocking the road to the south to help. Israelis suffered 30 casualties, but successfully repelled the assault. A Samson's Foxes force was sent to assist in the southern position, but encountered Egyptian Bren carriers and turned back. The Egyptians, finding themselves isolated, also decided to avoid another confrontation and the northern position retreated to Iraq Suwaydan, allowing Givati to complete the capture of the Junction.

== Battles around Fallujah and Iraq Suwaydan ==
In the night of October 18–19, the Israelis attacked various positions on the Egyptian "Burma Road", a bypass road created during the second truce after Israel captured Hatta and Karatiyya in Operation Death to the Invader. An initial Yiftach Brigade attack on Huleiqat the previous night failed, and the southern command decided to use its reinforcements brought for Operation Yoav, the Oded Brigade, to take a number of positions just west of Fallujah. The brigade had just been brought from the Galilee and did not get sufficient practice in fighting in a flat topography. The plan was to take Position 2, followed by 1 and 4, and finally Position 3.

Oded attacked from Karatiyya with the strength of four companies, without artillery or armored support. At 21:00 on October 18, they breached the fence of the 2nd position, but met with heavy fire and the deputy battalion commander was killed in action. The company in the operational reserve was brought to assist, but failed to effect a difference. Meanwhile, another company assaulted the 4th position and also managed to breach the fence. Interpreted as a success, the final company was sent to attack the 3rd position. It stalled due to Egyptian artillery fire and withdrew. At 02:00 on October 19, the company attacking the 4th position, pinned down and unable to advance, retreated as well, and at 03:00, the Oded forces fighting at the 2nd position did the same.

Two more attempts were made to capture the Iraq Suwaydan police fort until October 22. On the night of October 19–20, Givati's 51st Battalion made its assault, under the assumption that the fort was manned by one demoralized Egyptian platoon. The fort was surrounded by three barbed wire fences, and bunkers were placed in between. The Givati force encountered one such bunker, and could not overcome it until Ben-Zion Leitner threw a grenade inside and clear it. Leitner was severely injured, and later awarded the Hero of Israel. Nevertheless, exhausted and suffering from problems with their munitions, the Israeli forces retreated.

The 51st Battalion attempted another takeover of the fort on October 21–22. After an artillery and aircraft barrage at 18:00, the Givati forces made their assault, employing a rigged armored vehicle which was meant to blow a hole through the fort's walls. It got trapped between the barbed wire fences, but its explosion destroyed them and allowed the infantry to advanced onto the fort itself. Four soldiers managed to infiltrate it, but were overwhelmed by Egyptian fire and withdrew. The final battle of the corridor in Operation Yoav also came on the night of October 21–22, when Givati's 53rd Battalion made an attempts at the Egyptian Burma Road, failing to take any positions and retreating.

== Battles of Kawkaba and Huleiqat ==
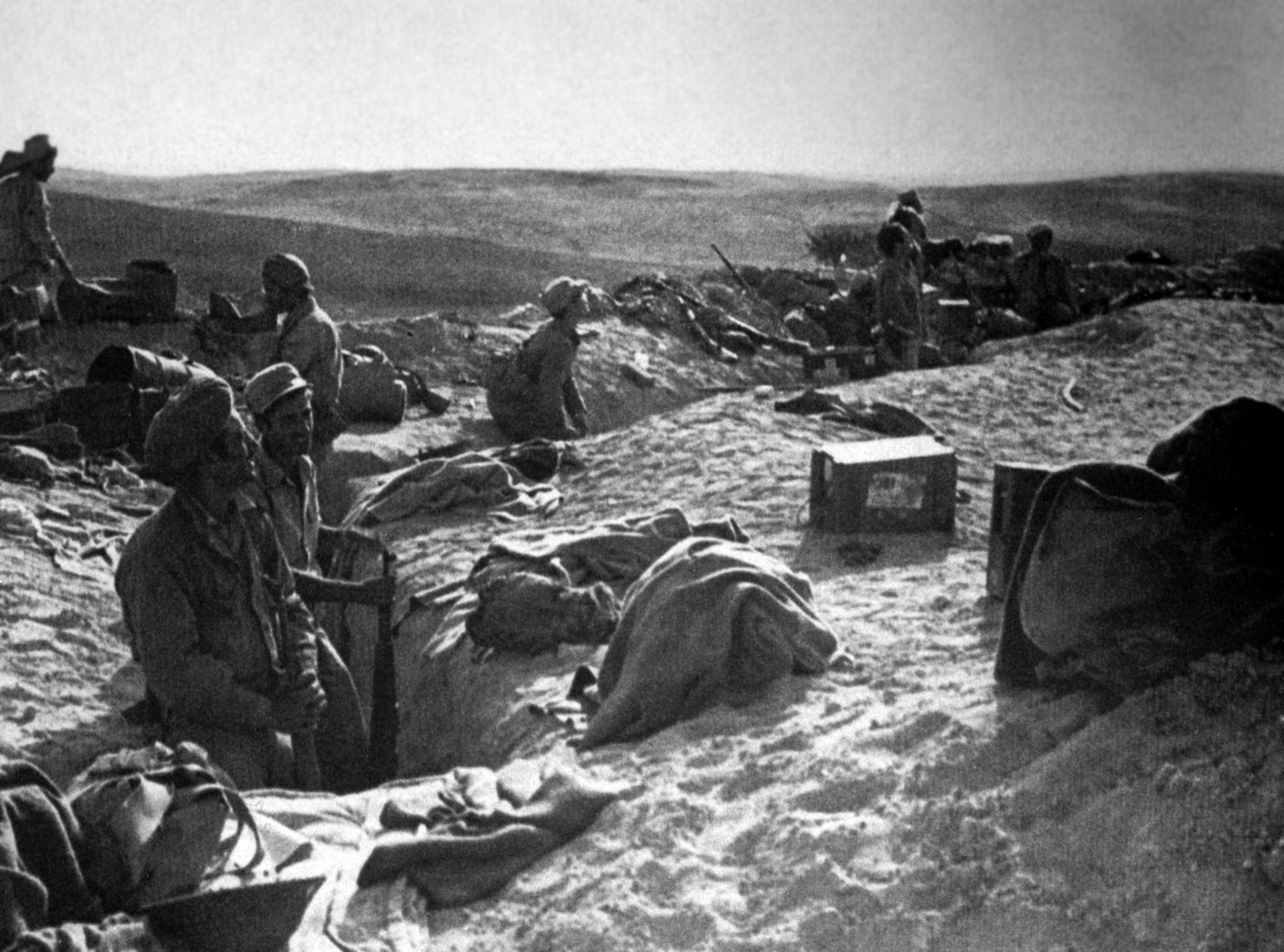
Israeli forces at Huleiqat

As mentioned, the Yiftach Brigade failed to capture Huleiqat and its outlying position (Hill 138.5) on October 17–18. Givati, on the other hand, succeeded in capturing Kawkaba to the north, and on October 18–19—the adjacent Bayt Tima. No further attempts were made to attack Huleiqat from the south, and instead Givati set out to capture it from the north. The participating units were four companies from the 52nd Battalion and two from the 54th. The Egyptians were spread out in hills 114.1, 123.2, 120, 120a, 128.2, 138.5, 131.2 and in Huleiqat itself. Their force now consisted of three companies—two of Egyptian and one of Saudi origin.

At 21:30 on October 19, Israeli artillery began shelling the Egyptian positions. The attack began at 22:45; Hill 120a was the first to fall, at the hands of the 52nd Battalion's 3rd Company, with little resistance, but the Saudi troops who retreated from there reinforced the adjacent Hill 128.2 and counterattacked, dislodging the Israelis who had just captured the hill. On Hill 120a, the Egyptians and Saudis left many weapons, including 34 Vickers machine guns, which an Egyptian prisoner of war taught the Givati forces to use. The weapons were used in the final capture of Hill 128.2.

The 54th Battalion's company took part of Hill 123.2, but entered a stalemate with the Egyptians there. Next, the 52nd Battalion's 1st Company took hills 114.1 and 120 in the center, in two waves. They then repelled an Egyptian counterattack from Huleiqat. Meanwhile, the 52nd Battalion's 2nd Company retook Hill 128.2. After establishing itself on Hill 120, part of the 1st Company (52nd) took Hill 138.5, facing only light resistance. The 54th Battalion's 3rd Company meanwhile assisted the 1st in finishing the takeover of Hill 123.2. Finally, at 03:00 on October 20, the Saudi forces manning Hill 131.2 retreated and the position was taken by the 52nd Battalion's 4th Company, putting the entire Kawkaba–Huleiqat corridor under Israeli control. Givati suffered 28 dead and 70 wounded.

== Significance ==
One of the main Israeli achievements of these battles, and indeed, Operation Yoav, was the creation of a permanent land corridor between the Israeli Negev enclave and the rest of the country, following the capture of Huleiqat on October 20. This allowed for the commencement of Operation Moshe on October 21, which saw the capture of Beersheba, the "capital of the Negev", by the Negev Brigade. Another point of significance was the creation of the basic guidelines for what would later become the Fallujah Pocket (the area of Fallujah – Iraq al-Manshuyya), and the general cutting off of the western wing of the Egyptian expeditionary force from its eastern wing.
