= Bayt Tima =

Bayt Tima بيت طيما Beit Tima Batima
- Etymology: The house of Tima
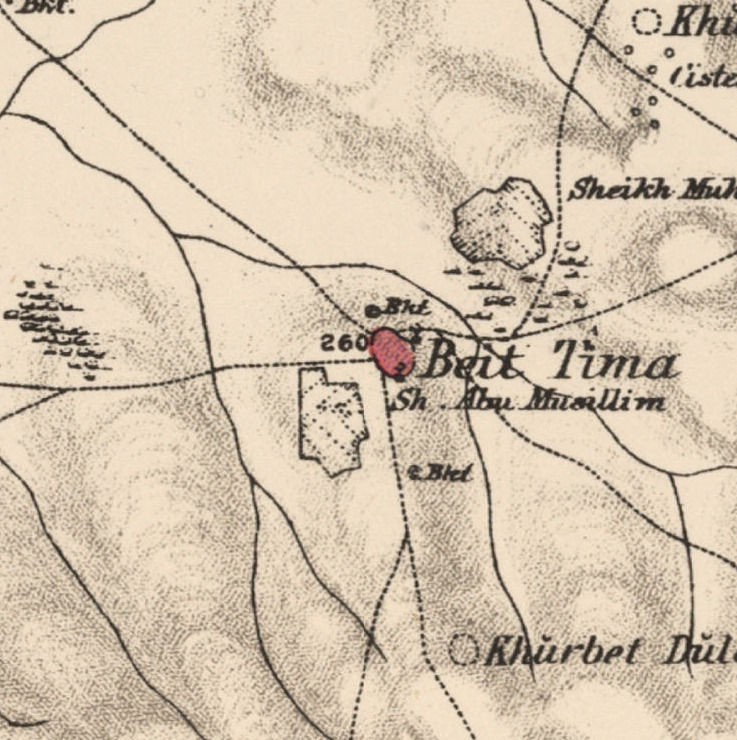
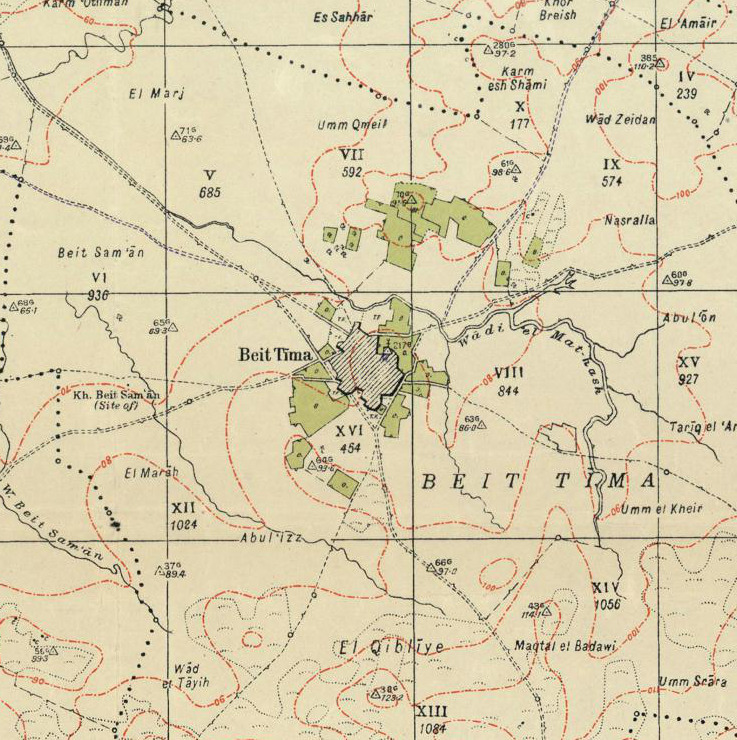
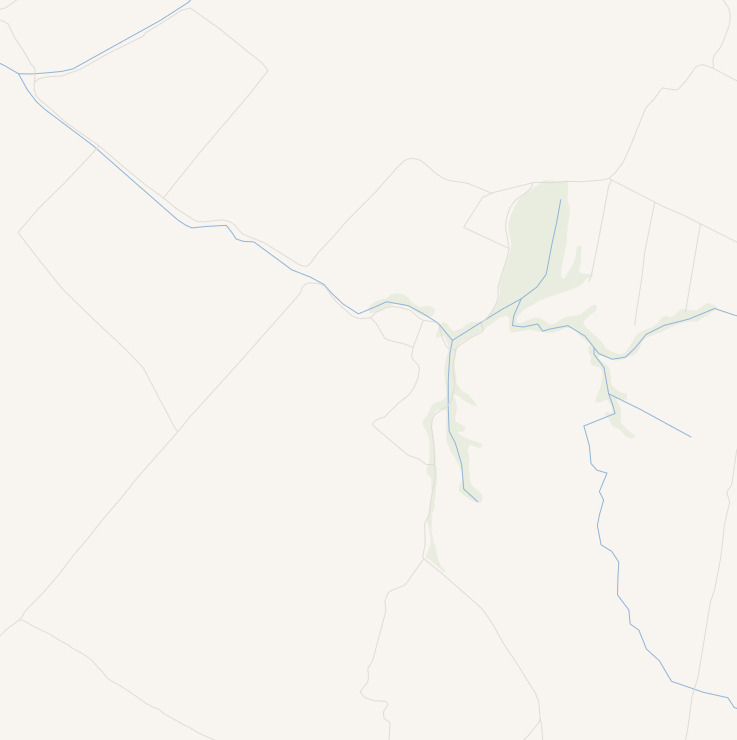
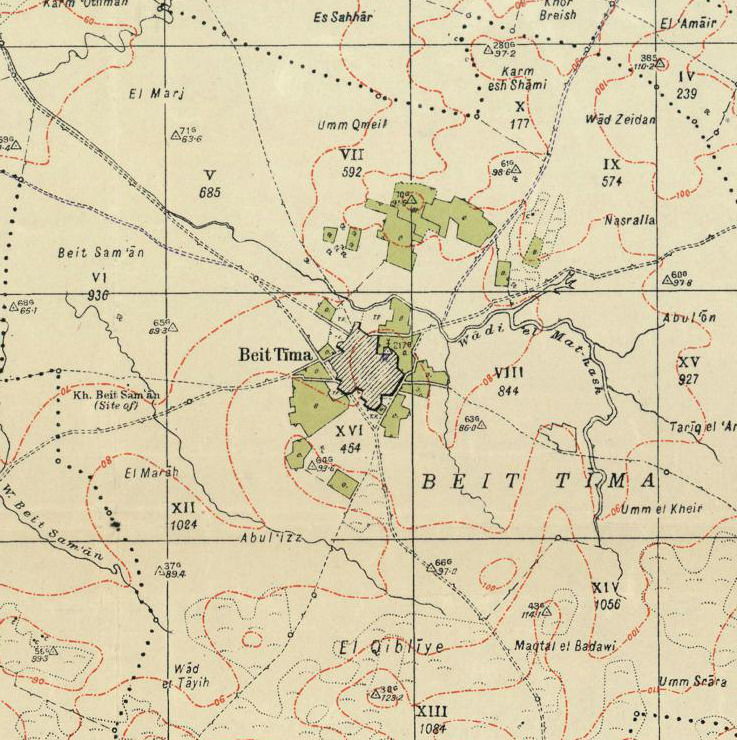
- 1870s map 1940s map modern map 1940s with modern overlay map A series of historical maps of the area around Bayt Tima (click the buttons)

- Location within Mandatory Palestine
- Coordinates: 31°37′24″N 34°38′21″E
- Palestine grid: 115/114
- Geopolitical entity: Mandatory Palestine
- Subdistrict: Gaza
- Date of depopulation: October 18–19, 1948

Area
  - Total: 11,032 dunams (11.032 km^{2}; 4.259 sq mi)

Population (1945)
  - Total: 1,060
- Cause(s) of depopulation: Military assault by Yishuv forces
- Current Localities: No settlements on village lands

Bayt Tima (Arabic: بيت طيما) was a Palestinian Arab village in the Gaza Subdistrict, located 21 kilometers (13 mi) northeast of Gaza and some 12 kilometers (7.5 mi) from the coastline. It was situated in flat terrain on the southern coastal plain of Palestine. Bayt Tima was depopulated during the 1948 Arab-Israeli War. Its population in 1945 was 1,060.

== History ==
During the Mandate period the village was inspected by the Department of Antiquities, and a number of ancient remains were noted, in addition to two Arabic inscriptions built into the mosque. In the cemetery located just south of Bayt Tima lies a worn mosaic pavement, suggesting an Ancient Roman or Byzantine presence at the site.

A 14th-century Mamluk-era mosque existed on the site dedicated to a certain prophet or local saint named "Nabi Tima". In the courtyard of the mosque and near it are imitations of Corinthian capitals and columns of gray stone. The remainder of the building was built in local kurkar stone. There is no mention of Bayt Tima in early Arabic sources and the inscription on the mosque is the only Mamluk association to it.

=== Ottoman era ===
Bayt Tima came under Ottoman rule in the early 16th century, and in the 1596 tax records it was under the administration of the nahiya of Gaza, part of the Liwa of Gaza, with a population of 126 Muslim households, an estimated 693 persons. The inhabitants paid a fixed tax rate of 33,3% on a number of crops, including wheat, barley, fruit, almonds, sesame, beehives, and goats; a total of 21,200 akçe.

Marom and Taxel have shown that during the seventeenth to eighteenth centuries, nomadic economic and security pressures led to settlement abandonment around Majdal ‘Asqalān, and the southern coastal plain in general. The population of abandoned villages moved to surviving settlements, while the lands of abandoned settlements continued to be cultivated by neighboring villages. Thus, Bayt Tima absorbed the lands of Sama, Bayt Sam'an and Irza, mentioned separately as inhabited villages in the Ottoman tax registers of the 16th century.

In 1838, Beit Tima was noted as a Muslim village in the Gaza area.

The Ottomans constructed additions to the mosque, and the Egyptians under Muhammad Ali of Egypt reconstructed it in the 1830s. In 1863 the French explorer Victor Guérin visited Bayt Tima, noting that it had a population of 400 and mentioning the Mamluk mosque.

An Ottoman village list of about 1870 indicated 49 houses and a population of 159, though the population count included men, only.

In 1883, the PEF's Survey of Western Palestine described it as being of moderate-size, with two pools and shrines, and two small patches of garden nearby.

=== British Mandate era ===
In the 1922 census of Palestine conducted by the British Mandate authorities, Bait Tima had a population of 606 Muslims, increasing by the 1931 census to 762, still all Muslim, in 157 houses.

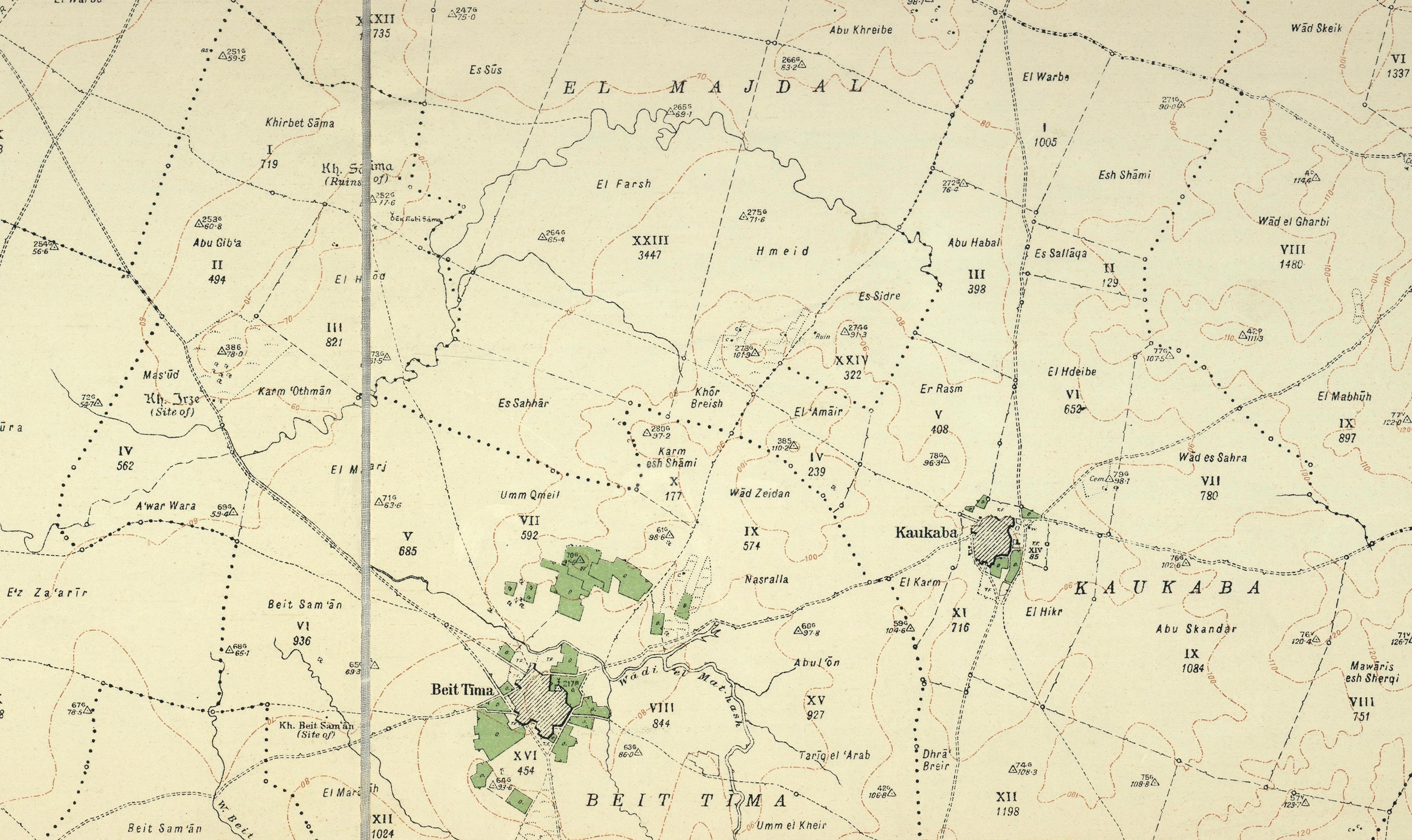
Beit Tima 1931 1:20,000

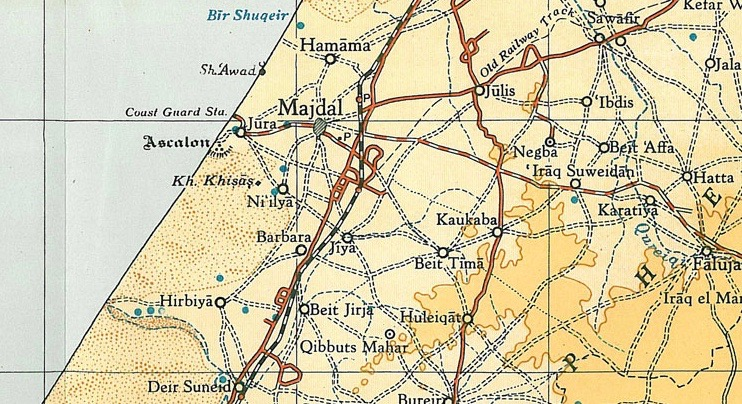
Beit Tima 1945 1:20,000

In the 1945 statistics the population of Beit Tima consisted of 1060, all Muslims, and the land area was 11,032 dunams, according to an official land and population survey. Of this, 197 dunams were designated for plantations and irrigable land, 10,444 for cereals, while 60 dunams were built-up areas.

During the British Mandate period, Bayt Tima had its own shops, the 14th-century mosque, and an elementary school built in 1946. It shared the school with nearby Hulayqat and Kawkaba. Its adobe houses—which amounted to 157—were grouped together in blocks, separated by streets or open space; the largest block was at the center of the village. Most residents worked in rainfed agriculture, cultivating grain, vegetables, and fruits, especially figs, apricots, and almonds.

=== 1948 War and aftermath ===
According to the Jaffa-based newspaper Filastin, a "Zionist attempt" to infiltrate Bayt Tima was recorded as early as February 1948, preceding the outbreak of the 1948 Arab-Israeli War. Their forces were driven back by a "hail of bullets" from the local militiamen which lasted for half an hour.

On 30/31 May the Negev Brigade reported that they had conquered Bayt Tima, killing some 20 Arabs and destroying the well and a granary. Morris notes that it was later reconquered by the Egyptian army, to finally falling to the Israelis in October.

Israeli sources had told the Associated Press that they had occupied Bayt Tima at the beginning of June. They claimed it was captured while "slashing behind an Egyptian coastal spearhead" on June 1. But the occupation was short-lived, since Israeli forces also threatened Bayt Tima a month later, according to Egyptian writer Muhammad Abd al-Munim. He writes that at the end of the first truce, in early July, the village was held by Palestinian militiamen and Israeli forces encroached on Bayt Tima, occupying the hills overlooking it. Its defenders were reinforced by a Saudi Arabian company fighting on the southern front and Bayt Tima supposedly remained in Arab hands throughout the second truce.

An aerial and artillery bombardment against the village in mid-October 1948 led to the flight of a large number of refugees from Bayt Tima. It was occupied on October 18–19 in the early stages of Operation Yoav by the Givati Brigade. The New York Times quoted an Israeli communique on October 20 which said that Bayt Tima had fallen, along with Hulayqat and Kawkaba.

Following the war the area was incorporated into the State of Israel, but the village's land remained undeveloped. According to Palestinian historian Walid Khalidi, "Sycamore and carob trees grow around the rubble on the site. The land is used for agriculture."

== Bibliography ==
- Barron, J.B., ed. (1923). Palestine: Report and General Abstracts of the Census of 1922. Government of Palestine.
- Conder, C.R.; Kitchener, H.H. (1883). The Survey of Western Palestine: Memoirs of the Topography, Orography, Hydrography, and Archaeology. Vol. 3. London: Committee of the Palestine Exploration Fund.
- Government of Palestine, Department of Statistics (1945). Village Statistics, April, 1945.
- Guérin, V. (1869). Description Géographique Historique et Archéologique de la Palestine. Vol. 1: Judee, pt. 2. Paris, L'Imprimerie Imp.
- Hadawi, S. (1970). Village Statistics of 1945: A Classification of Land and Area ownership in Palestine. Palestine Liberation Organization Research Center.
- Hartmann, M. (1883). "Die Ortschaftenliste des Liwa Jerusalem in dem türkischen Staatskalender für Syrien auf das Jahr 1288 der Flucht (1871)". Zeitschrift des Deutschen Palästina-Vereins. 6: 102–149.
- Hütteroth, W.-D.; Abdulfattah, K. (1977). Historical Geography of Palestine, Transjordan and Southern Syria in the Late 16th Century. Erlanger Geographische Arbeiten, Sonderband 5. Erlangen, Germany: Vorstand der Fränkischen Geographischen Gesellschaft. ISBN 3-920405-41-2.
- Karmon, Y. (1960). "An Analysis of Jacotin's Map of Palestine" (PDF). Israel Exploration Journal. 10 (3, 4): 155–173, 244–253. Archived from the original (PDF) on 2019-12-22.
- Khalidi, W. (1992). All That Remains: The Palestinian Villages Occupied and Depopulated by Israel in 1948. Washington D.C.: Institute for Palestine Studies. ISBN 0-88728-224-5.
- Mills, E., ed. (1932). Census of Palestine 1931. Population of Villages, Towns and Administrative Areas. Jerusalem: Government of Palestine.
- Morris, B. (2004). The Birth of the Palestinian Refugee Problem Revisited. Cambridge University Press. ISBN 978-0-521-00967-6.
- Palmer, E.H. (1881). The Survey of Western Palestine: Arabic and English Name Lists Collected During the Survey by Lieutenants Conder and Kitchener, R. E. Transliterated and Explained by E.H. Palmer. Committee of the Palestine Exploration Fund.
- Petersen, Andrew (2001). A Gazetteer of Buildings in Muslim Palestine (British Academy Monographs in Archaeology). Vol. 1. Oxford University Press. ISBN 978-0-19-727011-0.
- Robinson, E.; Smith, E. (1841). Biblical Researches in Palestine, Mount Sinai and Arabia Petraea: A Journal of Travels in the year 1838. Vol. 3. Boston: Crocker & Brewster.
- Sharon, M. (1999). Corpus Inscriptionum Arabicarum Palaestinae, B-C. Vol. 2. BRILL. ISBN 90-04-11083-6.
- Socin, A. (1879). "Alphabetisches Verzeichniss von Ortschaften des Paschalik Jerusalem". Zeitschrift des Deutschen Palästina-Vereins. 2: 135–163.
