= Samson's Foxes =

Military Unit

Samson's Foxes badge

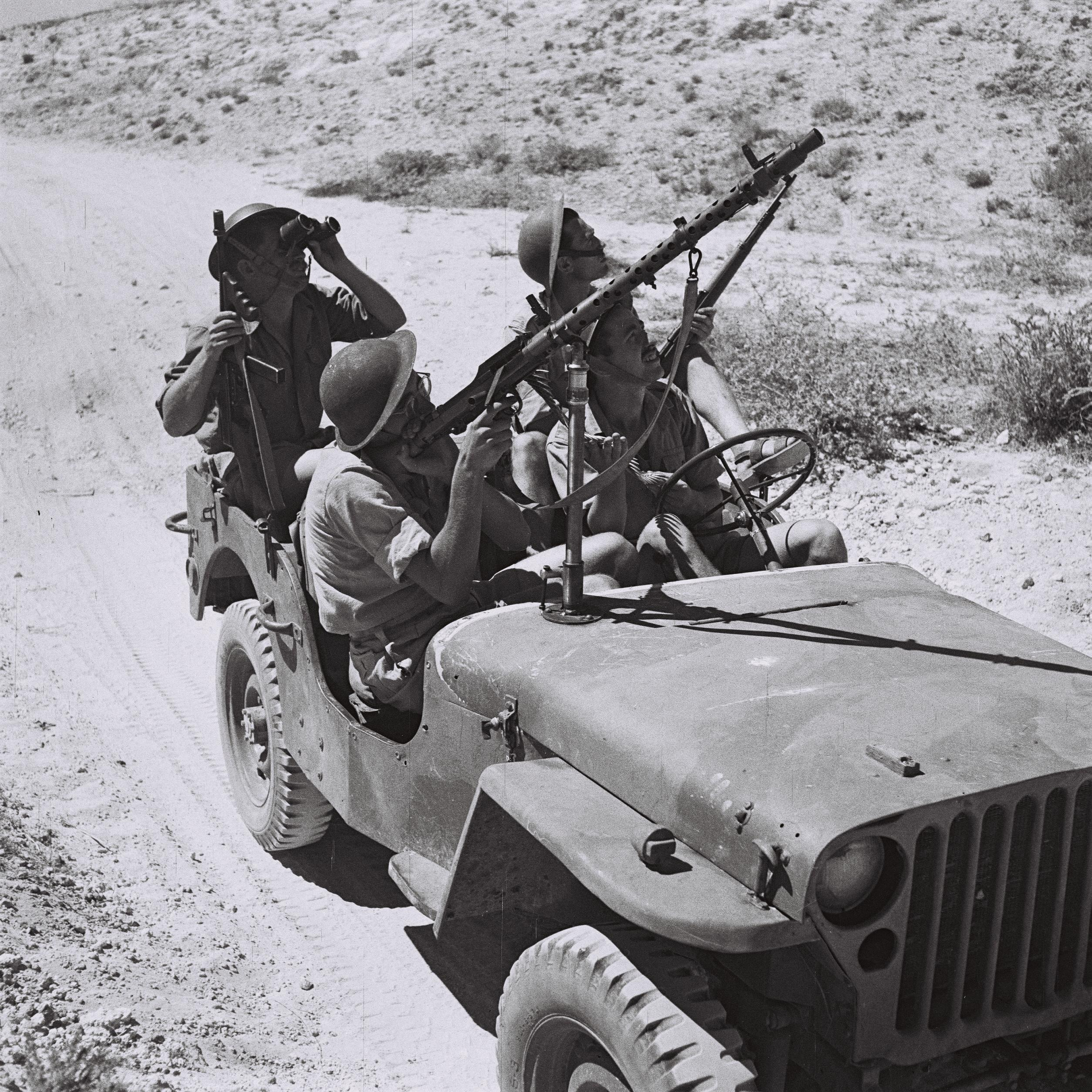
A Samson's Foxes patrol in September 1948

Samson's Foxes (Hebrew: שועלי שמשון, Shu'alei Shimshon) was an Israeli commando unit of the 1948 Arab–Israeli War. It was part of the 54th Battalion (commanded by Zvi Zur) of the Givati Brigade. The unit participated in various battles on the southern front, including Operation GYS and the Battles of the Separation Corridor.

Uri Avnery, later to become an outspoken advocate of Israeli-Palestinian Peace and a personal friend of Yasser Arafat, was a member of this unit and wrote a song called "Samson's Foxes" which was its unofficial anthem.

The modern Givati brigade named its reconnaissance companies after the 1940s unit in 1983. The companies were consolidated into a reconnaissance battalion of the same name in 2001, once again subordinate to the Givati Brigade. Most of its work is confidential, though it is known to operate under the IDF's Gaza territorial command.

The unit's name is derived from the Bible. In Judges 15:4 the Judge Samson is described as having attached torches to the tails of three hundred foxes, leaving the panicked beasts to run through the fields of the Philistines, burning all in their wake.

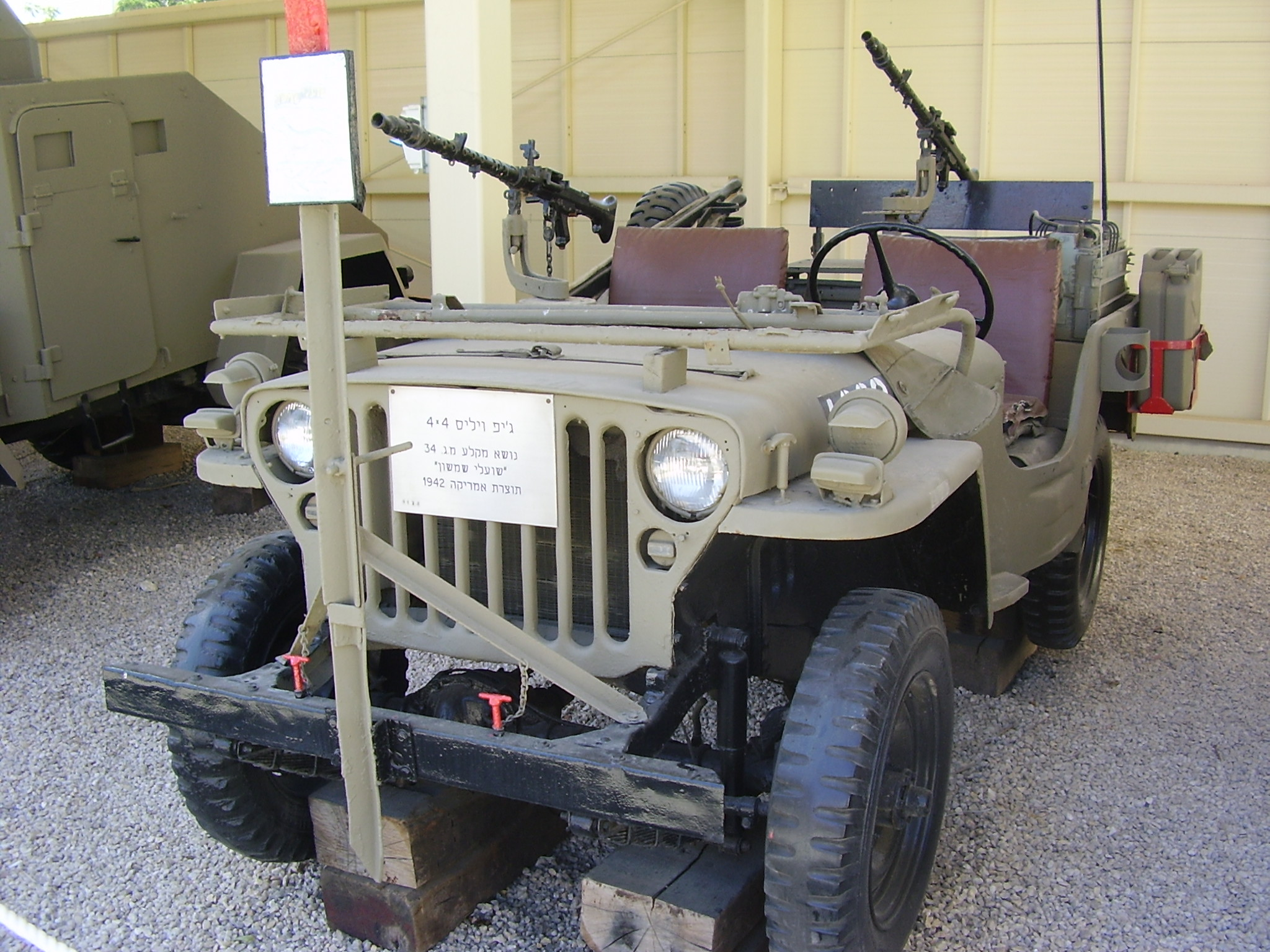
A Willys MB jeep equipped with two MG 34's that was used by Samson's Foxes unit in the 1948 Arab-Israeli War.

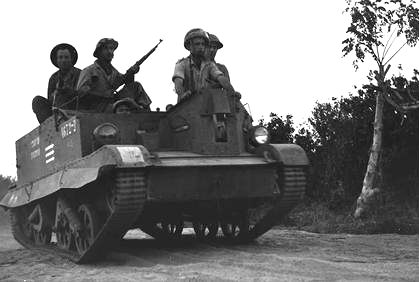
Egyptian Universal Carrier (Bren Carrier) captured by Israel in the 1948 Arab-Israeli War and remarked for the Samson's Foxes unit in the Givati Brigade.

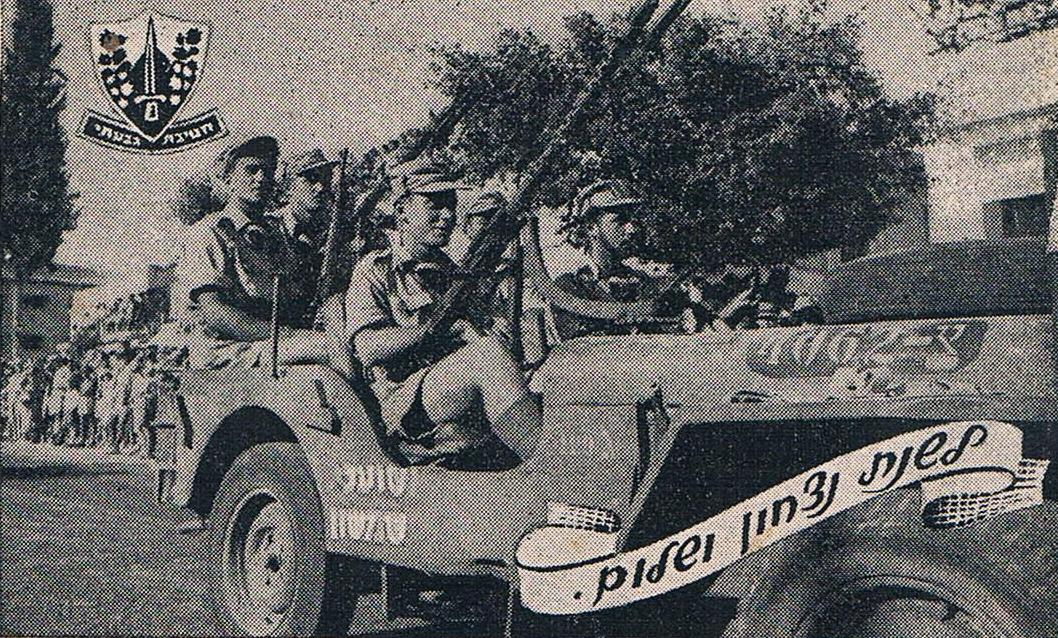
Samson's foxes during a parade held by the Givati Brigade. Albert Mandler is the front passenger seat.

The fox logo of the Israeli Army's Southern Command is derived from the same story.
