= Imad Fares =

Israeli Druze, a former Brig

- Native name: عماد فارس
- Born: 1961 (age 64–65); Israel
- Allegiance: Israel
- Branch: Israel Defense Forces
- Service years: 2001–2009
- Rank: General
- Commands: Givati Brigade; 91st Division

Imad Fares (Arabic: عماد فارس, Hebrew: עימאד פארס; born 1961) is an Israeli Druze and former brigadier general in the Israel Defense Force. He won acclaim as the commander of the Givati Brigade (infantry) from 2001 to 2003.

Fares was the commander of 91st Division, which is a regional division in the IDF Northern Command, responsible for the front with Lebanon, from Rosh HaNikra to Mount Hermon. On August 10, 2009, he resigned his commission and announced his retirement from service, after it was discovered he lied about the circumstances surrounding a car accident involving his wife driving his military-issued car.

== See also ==
- List of Israeli Druze
