= Kawkaba =

Kawkaba كوكبا Kaukaba
- Etymology: Star, or mountain, or donjon
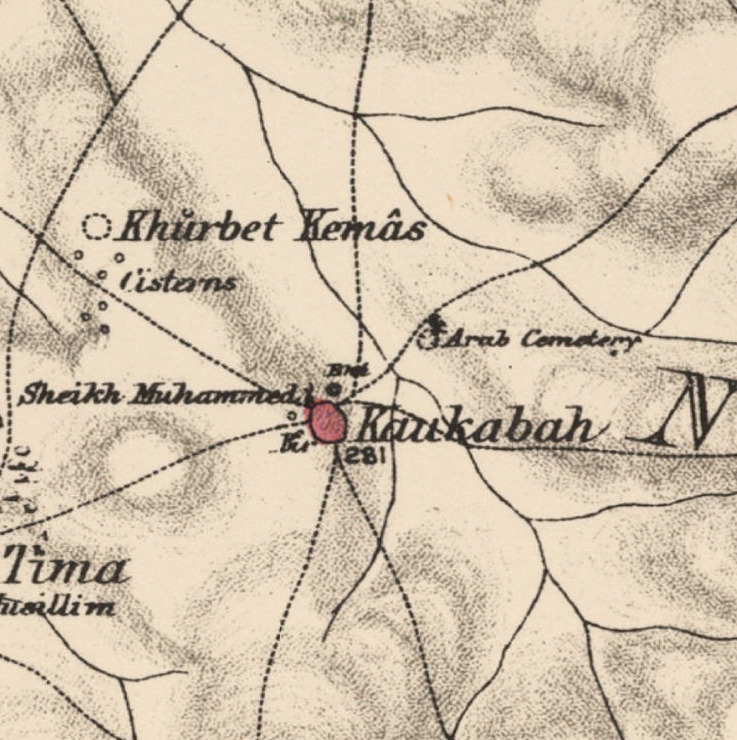
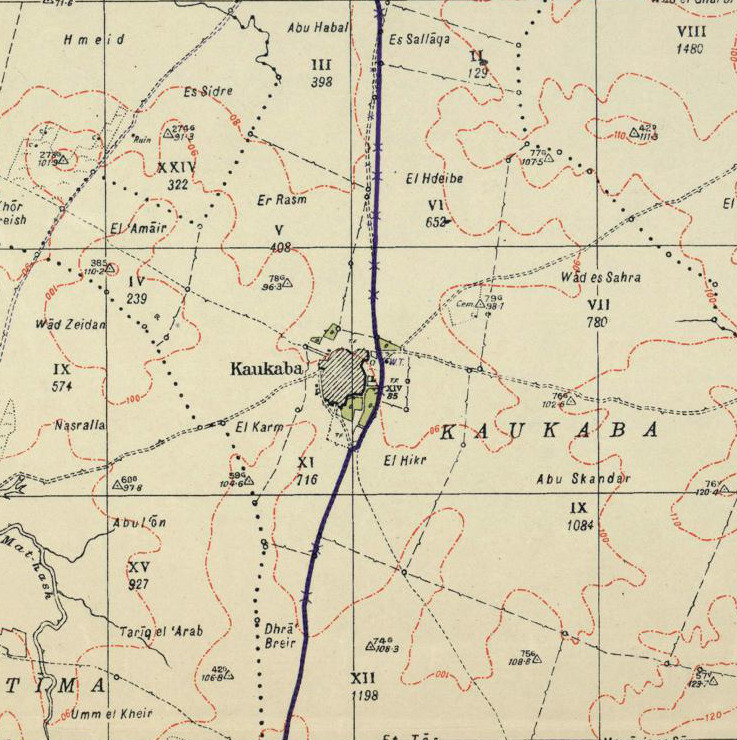
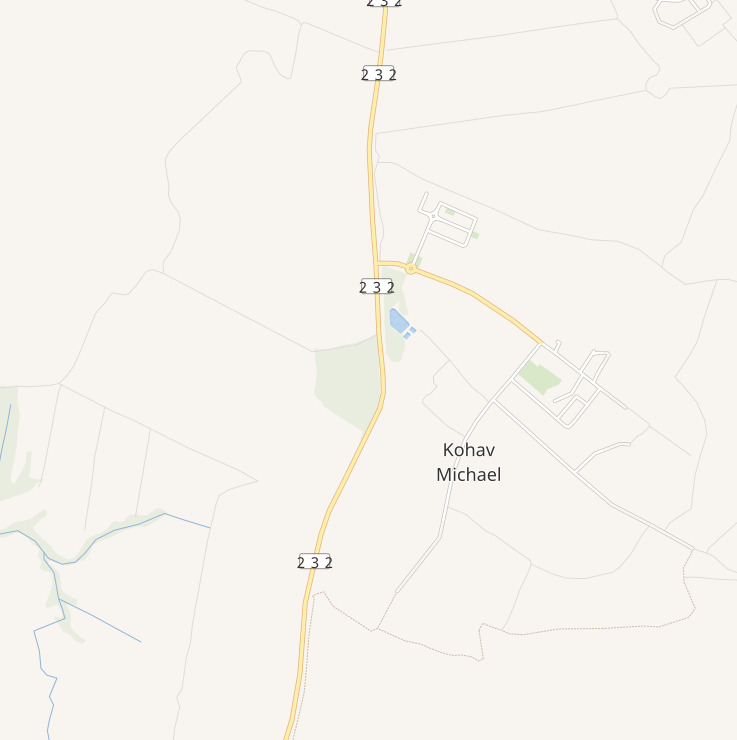
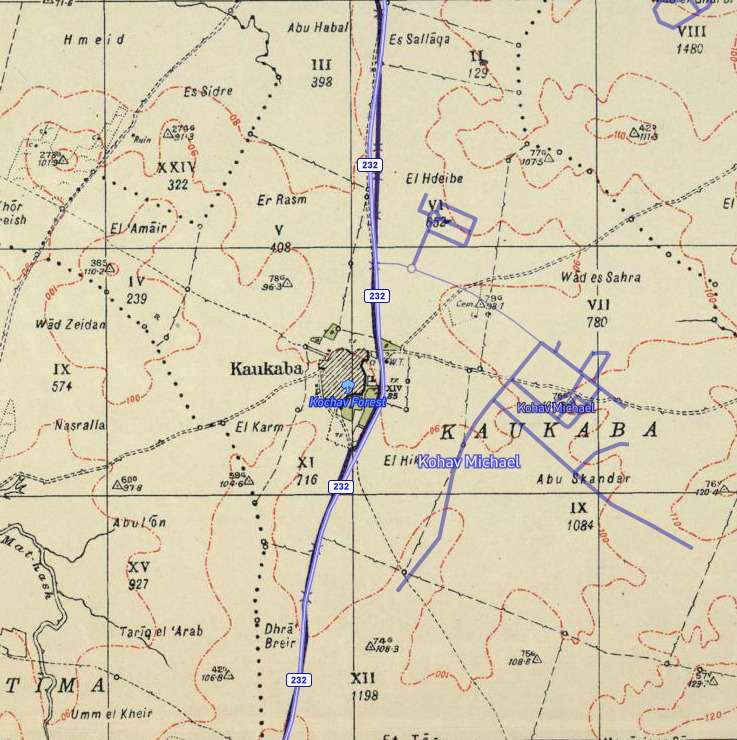
- 1870s map 1940s map modern map 1940s with modern overlay map A series of historical maps of the area around Kawkaba (click the buttons)

- Location within Mandatory Palestine
- Coordinates: 31°37′51″N 34°39′46″E
- Palestine grid: 117/115
- Geopolitical entity: Mandatory Palestine
- Subdistrict: Gaza
- Date of depopulation: 12 May 1948

Area
  - Total: 8,542 dunams (8.542 km^{2}; 3.298 sq mi)

Population (1945)
  - Total: 680
- Cause(s) of depopulation: Influence of nearby town's fall
- Current Localities: Kokhav Michael

Kawkaba (Arabic: كوكبا), known to the Crusaders as Coquebel, was a Palestinian Arab village that was occupied by Israel during Operation Yoav during the 1948 Arab-Israeli War, and depopulated.

== Location ==
The village was on an uneven stretch of red-brown soil on the southern coastal plain. It lay on the highway constructed by the British during World War II, which paralleled the coastal highway.

== History ==
The site was known during the Crusades as Coquebel. Kawkaba contained an archaeological site with a pool, cisterns, the foundations of buildings, columns, severed capitals. North of it was Khirbat Kamas, which was identified as the Crusader Camsa and which yielded some archaeological artifacts.

=== Ottoman era ===
Kawkaba was incorporated into the Ottoman Empire in 1517 with the rest of Palestine, and by 1596 tax record it was known as Kawkab, with a population of 16 Muslim households; an estimated 88 persons. The villagers paid a fixed tax rate of 33.3% on a number of crops, including wheat, barley, sesame, fruit trees and vineyards; a total of 2,640 akçe. 6/24 of the revenue went to a waqf.

During the 17th and 18th centuries, the area of Kawkaba experienced a significant process of settlement decline due to nomadic pressures on local communities. The residents of abandoned villages moved to surviving settlements, but the land continued to be cultivated by neighboring villages.

In 1838, Edward Robinson noted Kaukaba as a Muslim village, located in the Gaza district.

In 1863 Victor Guérin found that the village has a population of five hundred inhabitants. In the interior of a oualy dedicated to Sheikh Mohammed he observed mutilated fluted white marble column, next to a Corinthian capital. At the well, he noted two barrels, also ancient columns, one with white marble, the second gray granite, which were, he thought, exhumed in that area and did not come from elsewhere.

An Ottoman village list of about 1870 showed Kokabe with a population of 72, in 20 houses, though the population count included men, only.

In 1882, the PEF's Survey of Western Palestine described it as a small adobe village, with a well to the west and a pool to the north. The village had a rectangular layout along the above-mentioned road, and expanded north–south alongside it.

=== British Mandate era ===
In the 1922 census of Palestine, conducted by the British Mandate authorities, Kukaba had a population of 439, all Muslims, increasing in the 1931 census to 522, still all Muslims, in 121 houses.

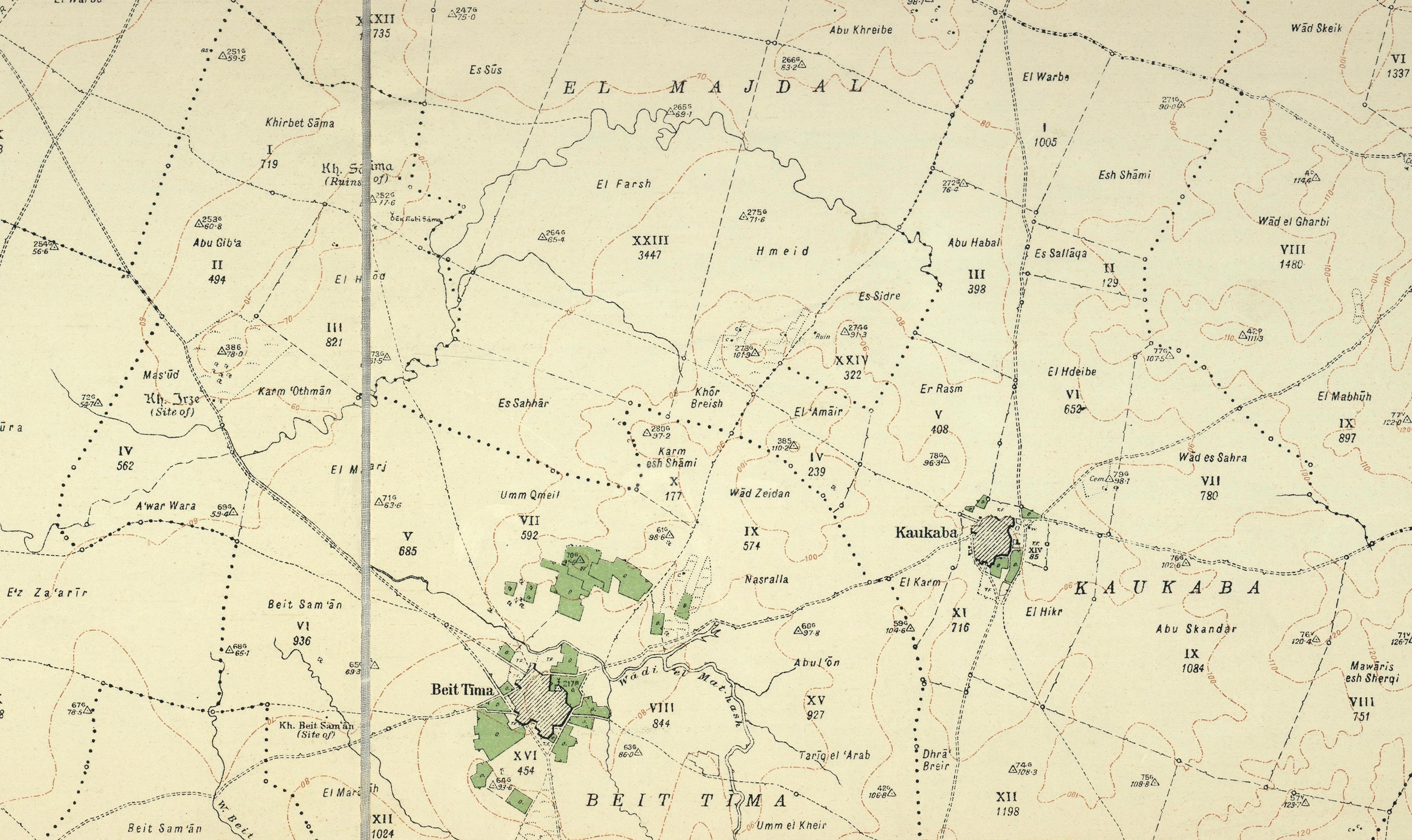
Kawkaba 1931 1:20,000

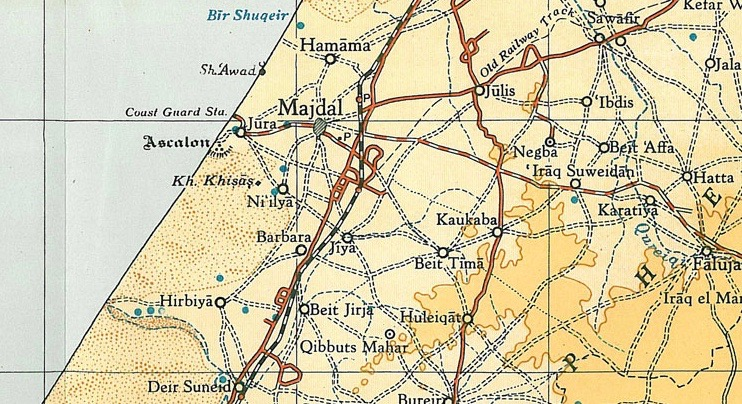
Kawkaba 1945 1:20,000

Kawkaba shared an elementary school with the villages of Bayt Tima and Hulayqat. Its houses were made of adobe and cement, and its shops were located at the village center, on the western side of the road. On its eastern site were two water sources: a spring and a 70-meter deep well. The villagers engaged in rainfed agriculture, cultivating grain and winter and summer vegetables. Towards the end of the British Mandate period they also cultivated fruits, such as figs and grapes, on all their land expect to the west.

In the 1945 statistics the population of Kaukaba was 680 Muslims, while the total land area was 8,542 dunams, according to an official land and population survey. Of this, a total of 166 dunams were used for plantations and irrigable land, 8,166 for cereals, while 40 dunams were built-up areas.

=== 1948 and after ===
The village that was captured by Israel during Operation Yoav during the 1948 Arab-Israeli War. The fall of the village was preceded by the events at nearby Burayr; where the Haganah Oded Brigade apparently executed a large number of military age Palestinians. The Kawkaba villages had offered to surrender to the Yishuv's forces but the Haganah drove out the last of the inhabitants on the 27/28 May 1948. The village was on the front line between the Israeli and Egyptian armies through the summer of 1948 and appears to have changed hands several times.

Following the war the area was incorporated into the State of Israel and in 1950 the moshav of Kokhav Michael was founded on village land, southeast of the village site.

According to Khalidi, by 1992 the remaining structures on the village land were:

"The site is overgrown with sycamore and Christ's -thorn trees. The old road, as well as crumbled walls and debris in a wooded part of the site are clearly visible. The land in the vicinity is cultivated by Israeli farmers."

== People from Kawkaba ==
- The family of Mohammed Deif lived in Kawkaba before the 1948 war.

== Bibliography ==
- Barron, J.B., ed. (1923). Palestine: Report and General Abstracts of the Census of 1922. Government of Palestine.
- Conder, C.R.; Kitchener, H.H. (1883). The Survey of Western Palestine: Memoirs of the Topography, Orography, Hydrography, and Archaeology. Vol. 3. London: Committee of the Palestine Exploration Fund.
- Department of Statistics (1945). Village Statistics, April, 1945. Government of Palestine.
- Guérin, V. (1869). Description Géographique Historique et Archéologique de la Palestine (in French). Vol. 1: Judee, pt. 2. Paris: L'Imprimerie Nationale.
- Hadawi, S. (1970). Village Statistics of 1945: A Classification of Land and Area ownership in Palestine. Palestine Liberation Organization Research Center.
- Hartmann, M. (1883). "Die Ortschaftenliste des Liwa Jerusalem in dem türkischen Staatskalender für Syrien auf das Jahr 1288 der Flucht (1871)". Zeitschrift des Deutschen Palästina-Vereins. 6: 102–149.
- Hütteroth, W.-D.; Abdulfattah, K. (1977). Historical Geography of Palestine, Transjordan and Southern Syria in the Late 16th Century. Erlanger Geographische Arbeiten, Sonderband 5. Erlangen, Germany: Vorstand der Fränkischen Geographischen Gesellschaft. ISBN 3-920405-41-2.
- Khalidi, W. (1992). All That Remains: The Palestinian Villages Occupied and Depopulated by Israel in 1948. Washington D.C.: Institute for Palestine Studies. ISBN 0-88728-224-5.
- Mills, E., ed. (1932). Census of Palestine 1931. Population of Villages, Towns and Administrative Areas. Jerusalem: Government of Palestine.
- Morris, B. (2004). The Birth of the Palestinian Refugee Problem Revisited. Cambridge University Press. ISBN 978-0-521-00967-6.
- Palmer, E.H. (1881). The Survey of Western Palestine: Arabic and English Name Lists Collected During the Survey by Lieutenants Conder and Kitchener, R. E. Transliterated and Explained by E.H. Palmer. Committee of the Palestine Exploration Fund.
- Robinson, E.; Smith, E. (1841). Biblical Researches in Palestine, Mount Sinai and Arabia Petraea: A Journal of Travels in the year 1838. Vol. 3. Boston: Crocker & Brewster.
- Socin, A. (1879). "Alphabetisches Verzeichniss von Ortschaften des Paschalik Jerusalem". Zeitschrift des Deutschen Palästina-Vereins. 2: 135–163.
