= Battle of Beersheba (1948) =

Part of Operation Yoav in the 1948 Arab–Israeli War

Coordinates: 31°14′38.12″N 34°47′37.01″E

- Part of 1948 Arab–Israeli War
Date	21 October 1948
Location	Beersheba, Israel
Result	Israeli victory

Belligerents
Israel	Egypt

Commanders and leaders
Nahum Sarig (Negev)	

Strength
Three battalions	Reinforced battalion

Casualties and losses
?	120 captured

The Battle of Beersheba, codenamed Operation Moses (Hebrew: מִבְצָע מֹשֶׁה, Mivtza Moshe), was an Israeli offensive on Beersheba on October 21, 1948. It was part of Operation Yoav and was conducted at the end of the operation. It was made possible following the opening of a land corridor from the Negev desert to the rest of Israel in the Battles of the Separation Corridor. The capture had both military and political significance. It helped sever the supply route of the Egyptian expeditionary force's eastern wing, and strengthened Israel's claim to the Negev desert.

The attack started at 04:00 on October 21, and involved the Negev Brigade and the 89th Battalion of the 8th Brigade. It ended at 09:15, when the Egyptians surrendered the town's police station.

== Background ==
The modern Beersheba was founded in the late 19th century, as part of a policy by Abdul Hamid II to build and expand population centers in the desert regions of the Ottoman Empire (others included Jerash, Amman and Aqaba). The town's streets were laid out in a grid plan, completely out of character for the Middle East at the time. The town became a regional capital and retained that status since.

The Jewish Yishuv was already planning to capture Beersheba as part of Operation Barak in the final days of the 1947–48 Civil War in Mandatory Palestine, but was forced to abandon the plan due to battles in the Jerusalem corridor and Kfar Darom. This only became plausible again in Operation Yoav, when large Israeli forces mounted a major offensive on Egyptian positions in several locations, including Beit Hanoun and the Separation Corridor.

== Prelude ==
=== Israeli forces ===
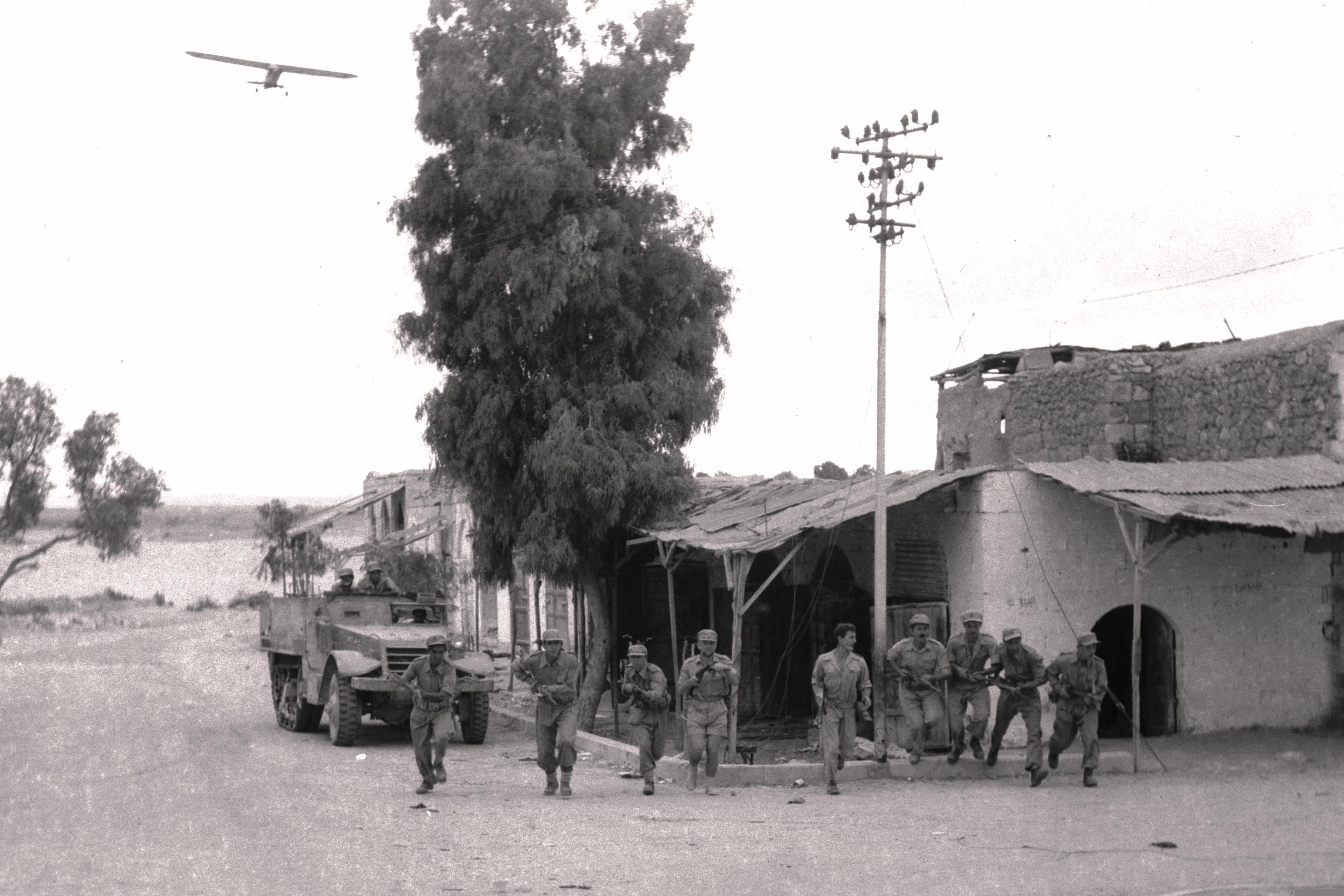
Israeli forces in Beersheba

Following the successes in these theaters, the IDF could make one final strike before the October 22 ceasefire would come into effect—in Gaza or in Beersheba. The assault would have to be successful within the framework of one day however, which was unlikely for Gaza as its defenses improved as the Egyptian expeditionary force's headquarters moved there from Majdal on October 19, 1948. Moreover, Beersheba now served as Egypt's only connection to its army's eastern wing, stationed between Hebron and Bethlehem.

Even before the opening of the land corridor to the Negev on October 20, the capture of Beersheba was the top priority of the Negev Brigade following its replenishment and resupply enabled by Operation Avak. On the night of October 19–20, the Israelis sent much of the 8th Brigade and Negev's 7th Battalion to the enclave, as well as Negev Brigade infantry forces (from the 9th Battalion) engaged in raids in the Gaza–Rafah corridor (today the Gaza Strip). On October 20, the commanders of the respective forces met in the Negev Brigade headquarters in Shoval for a final briefing.

According to an Egyptian telegram intercepted by the Israelis, the forces in what would become the Fallujah Pocket were ordered to move to Beersheba, not knowing of the Israeli plan to take the town. Israeli Prime Minister David Ben-Gurion did not believe in the IDF's ability to take Beersheba in such a short time, but the telegram significantly increased the town's importance in his eyes, and he worked to delay the United Nations-imposed ceasefire as much as possible so that it could be taken.

=== Egyptian forces ===
The Egyptian forces in Beersheba consisted of a reinforced 1st Battalion, totaling about 500 soldiers, aided by mortars and artillery. The defenses of Beersheba consisted of 25 elevated fire positions, lacking trenches. Anti-tank ditches and barbed wire fences surrounded Beersheba in the south, east and northwest. The battalion headquarters were located in the old Ottoman railway station.

The Egyptian command in Beersheba was unaware of Israel's success in the battles for the Separation Corridor, and was not expecting an attack. The command of the expeditionary force did know of these developments, but failed to send reinforcements in time.

== Battle ==
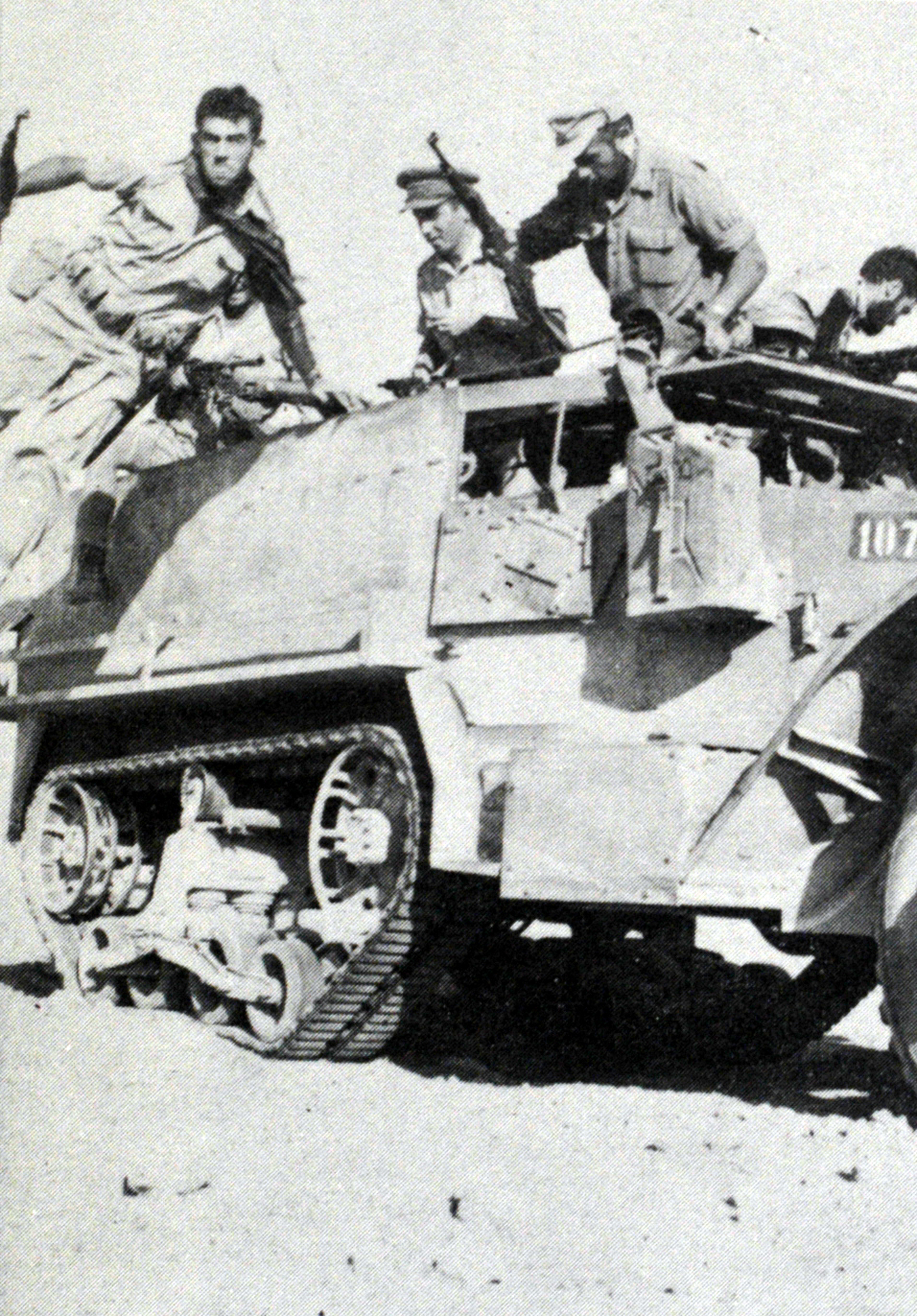
Palmach infantry units go into action during the fight for Beersheba

On the night of October 20–21, the Israeli force made its way from Mishmar HaNegev. It consisted of the 7th and 9th battalions of the Negev Brigade and the 89th Battalion of the 8th Brigade. It met with Egyptian artillery fire at Khirbet Abu 'Aisha, but continued eastward to the gathering point on Hill 315.2. An Israeli artillery force simultaneously left Hatzerim, west of Beersheba, and positioned itself mainly on Hill 279.9. The attack was meant to begin at midnight, but both forces were late. At 04:00, the main force started moving southward to Beersheba, and the artillery began its barrage. A small machine gun contingent from the artillery force occupied Hill 283, just northwest of the train station, to pin down the Egyptian forces there.

The new neighborhood in the northeast of Beersheba was then taken without a fight. The Israeli forces then proceeded to capture the cemetery and the entire northeastern part of the town. They stopped at a line opposite the town's police station, mosque and railway station to the west, while the Gaza–Beersheba road separated them from the southern portion of the town. An armored force was sent south to block the road to Bir 'Asluj.

When the Israelis realized that the second wave that was meant to complete the capture of Beersheba was late to arrive, they changed the attack plan and decided to surround the railway station. The assault, in the strength of one company, failed after four half-tracks were damaged by mines. The forces regrouped in the new neighborhood. At that point, about 60 Israeli soldiers were left in the city center, compared to an estimated 500 Egyptian troops fortified in the railway station. The Israeli reinforcements meanwhile reached the town and entered a battle with the Egyptians, who counterattacked.

At this point, the Egyptians began to fall into disarray, as some retreated southwards. The rest of the forces concentrated in the town's police station. The Israelis fired their antitank weapons at the station, with other contingents capturing the rest of Beersheba. The Egyptian soldiers at the police station eventually surrendered. At 09:15, the Israeli forces reported that the town was under their control. At 09:45 they regrouped and began to fan out, setting up fortifications in various positions around Beersheba.

== Aftermath ==
Although the majority of Beersheba's civilian population had fled as a result of Israeli air strikes, about 350 still lived there at the time of the battle, and were expelled to Gaza in the aftermath. Some were allegedly shot by the Israelis. Some of the estimated 120 Egyptian soldiers taken prisoner were also allegedly killed. The rest were mostly put to work cleaning the streets following the battle.

Beersheba became a major Israeli city and an integral part of the early Israeli national plans to disperse its population. Its abandoned homes were repopulated almost immediately by Jewish immigrants.
