= Hulayqat =

Hulayqat حليقات
- Village
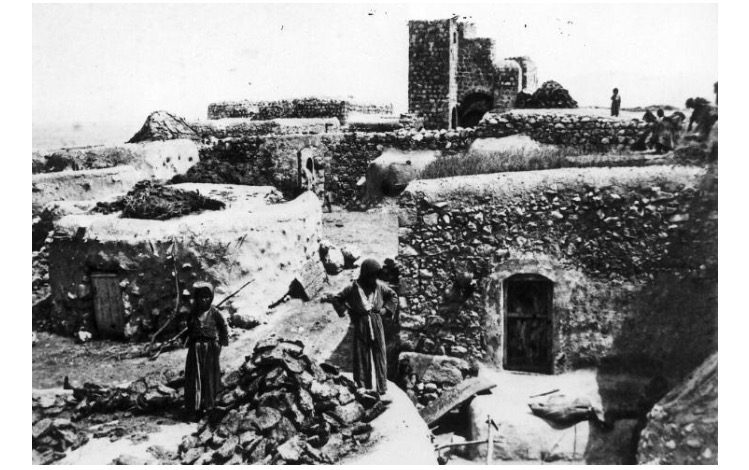
- Hulayqat, before 1948
- Etymology: the circles
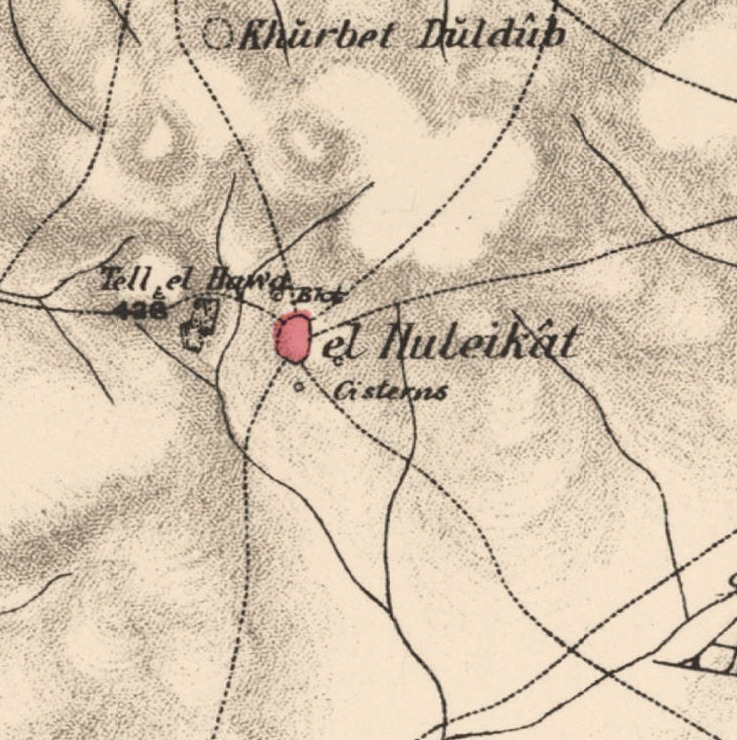
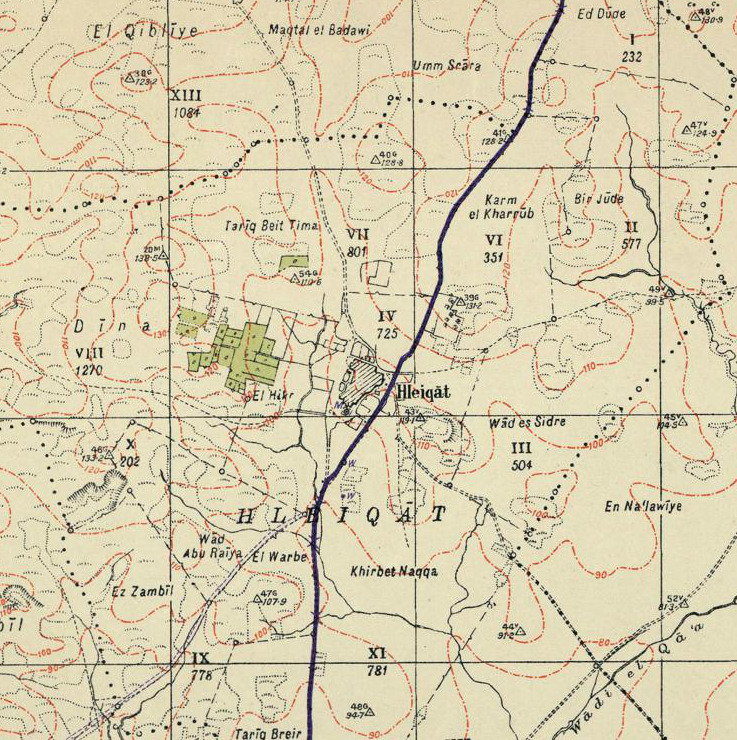
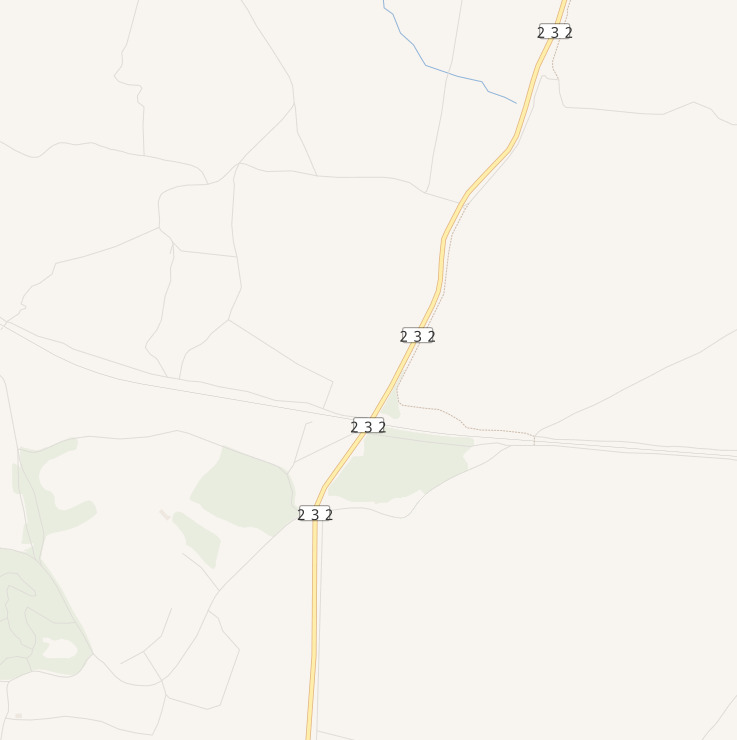
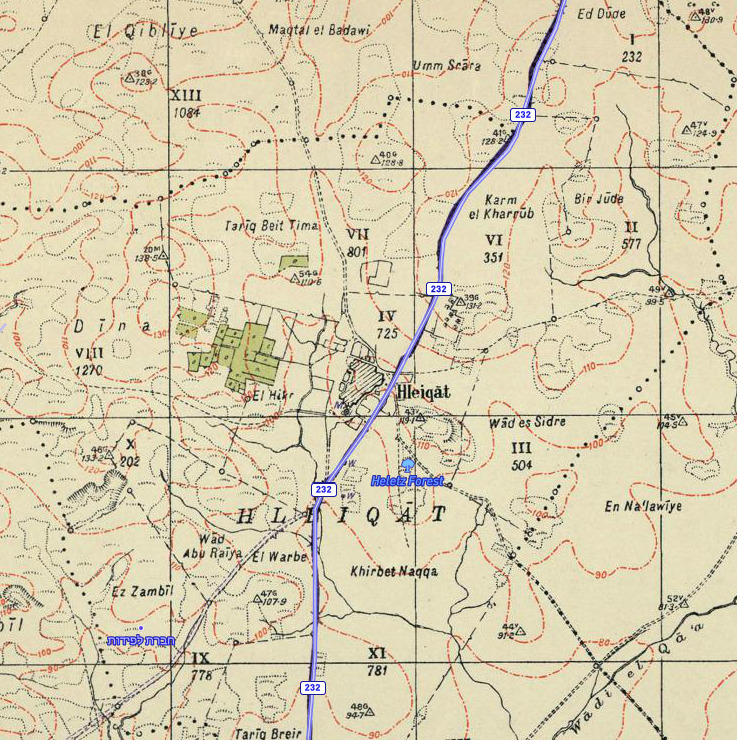
- 1870s map 1940s map modern map 1940s with modern overlay map A series of historical maps of the area around Hulayqat (click the buttons)

- Location within Mandatory Palestine
- Palestine grid: 116/112
- Geopolitical entity: Mandatory Palestine
- Subdistrict: Gaza
- Date of depopulation: May 12, 1948

Population (1945)
  - Total: 420
- Cause(s) of depopulation: Influence of nearby town's fall

Hulayqat was a Palestinian Arab village in the Gaza Subdistrict. It was depopulated during the 1947–1948 Civil War in Mandatory Palestine. It was located 20.5 km northeast of Gaza.

== History ==
Hulayqat's lands hosted numerous khirbas. Artifacts include pieces of marble and pottery as well as cisterns and a pool.

=== Ottoman era ===
During the 17th and 18th centuries, the area of Hulayqat experienced a significant process of settlement decline due to nomadic pressures on local communities. The residents of abandoned villages moved to surviving settlements, but the land continued to be cultivated by neighboring villages.

In 1838, in the Ottoman era, Huleikat was noted as village in the Gaza district.

An Ottoman village list from about 1870 showed that Hulayqat had a population of 55, with a total of 14 houses, though the population count included men, only.

In 1883, the PEF's Survey of Western Palestine described it as a "small village on a flat slope, with a high sandy hill to the west. It has cisterns and a pond, with a small garden to the west."

=== British Mandate era ===
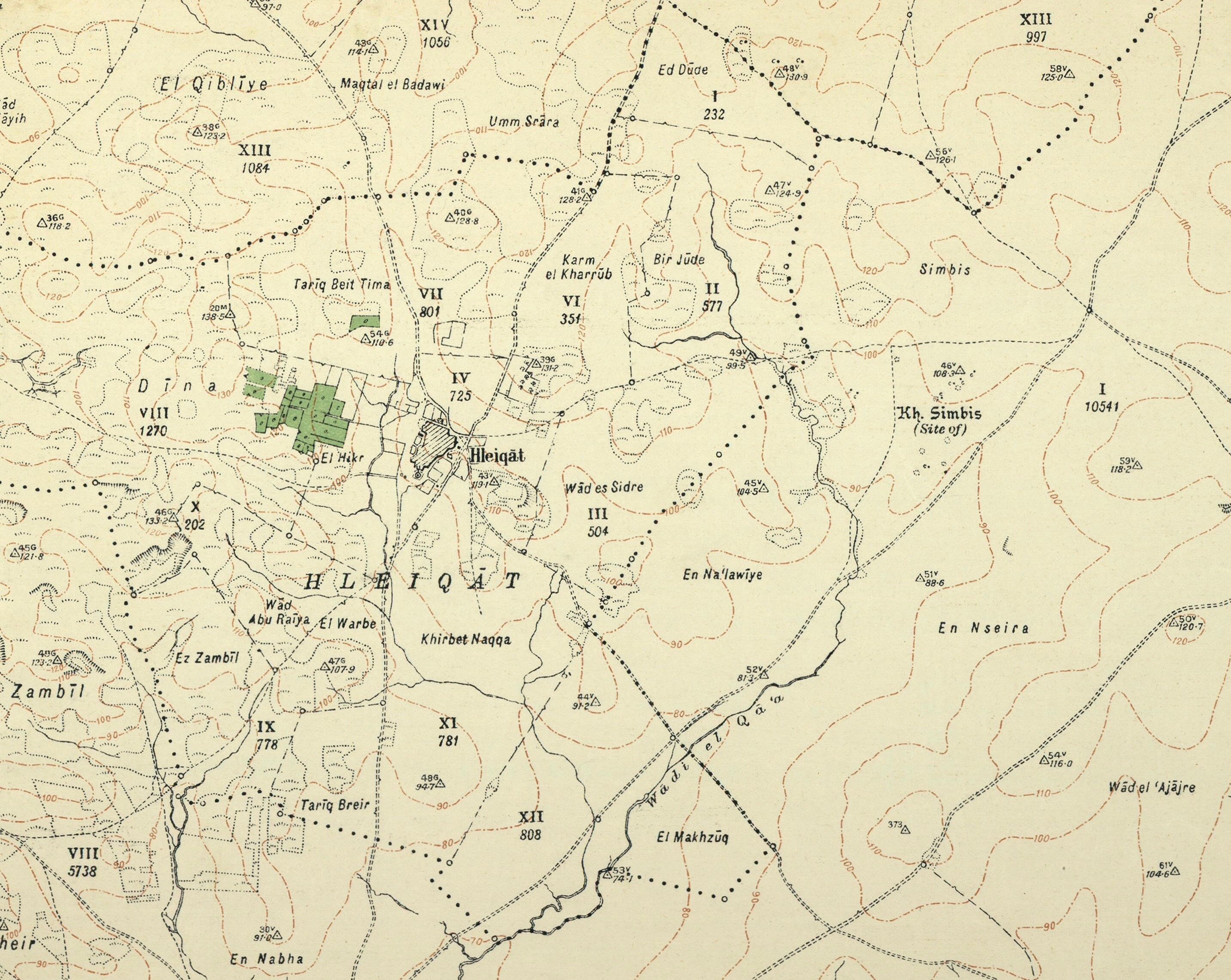
Hulayqat 1931 1:20,000

In the 1922 census of Palestine, conducted by the British Mandate authorities, Hukiqat had a population of 251 inhabitants, all Muslims, increasing in the 1931 census to 285, still all Muslims, in 61 houses.

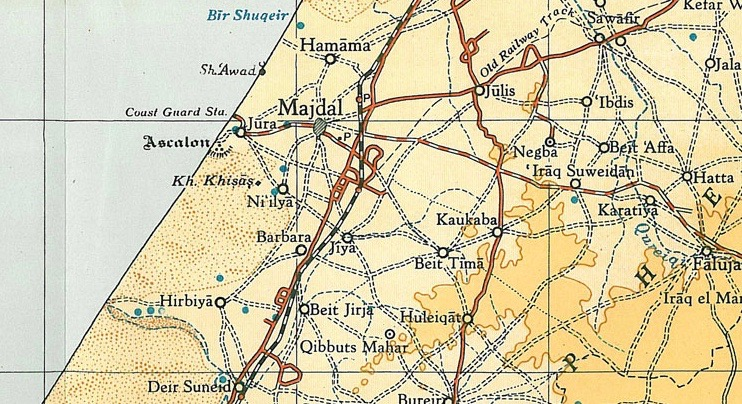
Hulayqat 1945 1:20,000

In the 1945 statistics Huleiqat had a population of 420 Muslims, with a total of 7,063 dunams of land, according to an official land and population survey. Of this, 115 dunams were used for plantations and irrigable land, 6,636 for cereals, while they had 18 dunams as built-up land.

In 1947, an oil drilling project commenced in Hulayqat employing 300 Arab workers.

=== 1948, aftermath ===
The village was first captured by the Israeli army on 13 May during Operation Barak and depopulated. On 8 July, it was retaken by the Egyptian army. A well-fortified battalion of the 4th Brigade was stationed there later reinforced by more troops. and some of the villagers returned to their homes. It was finally captured on 19 October by the Giv'ati Brigade during Operation Yoav.

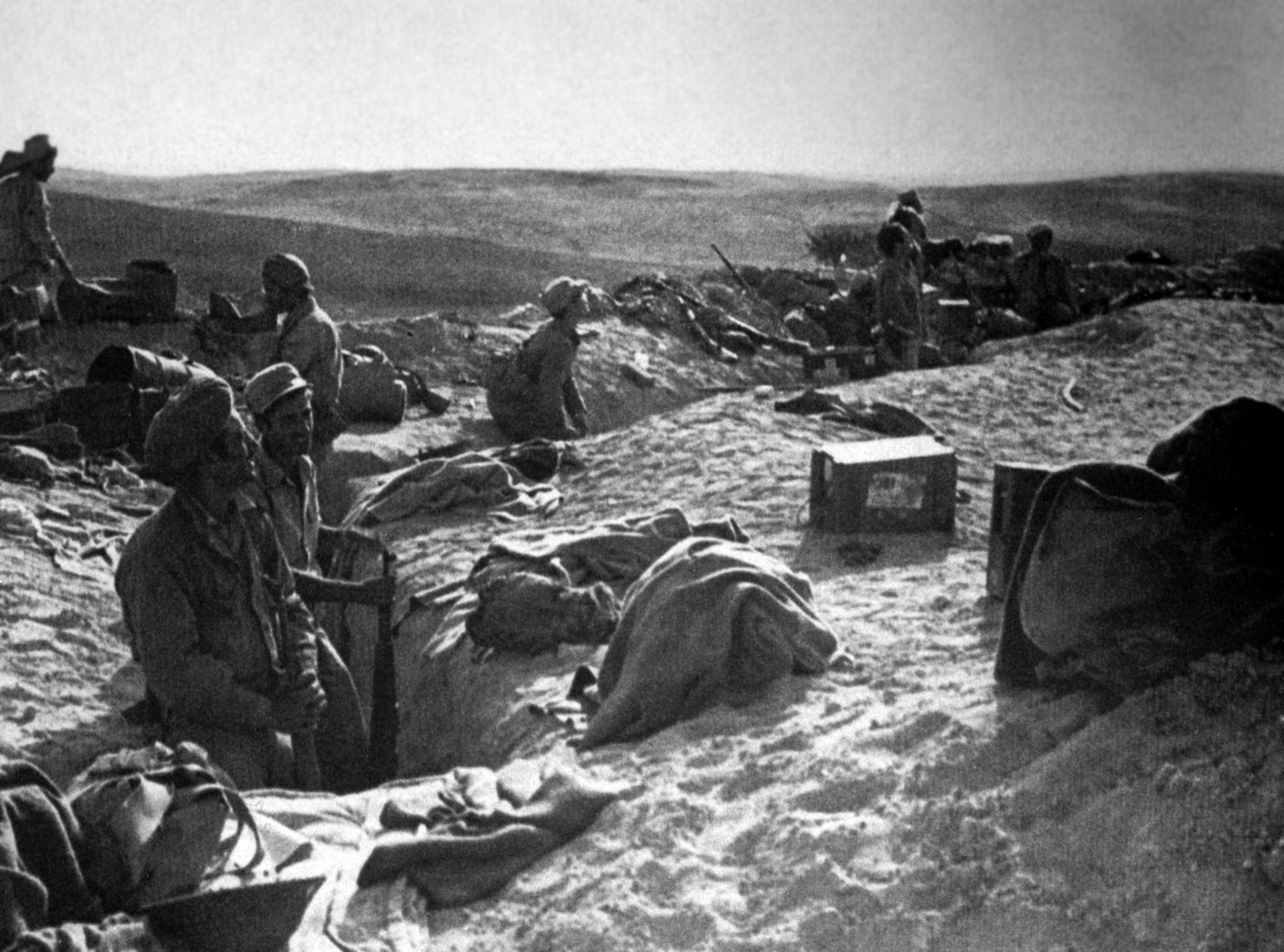
Israeli forces at Huleiqat

According to the Palestinian historian Walid Khalidi, the ruin of the village in 1992 was partially forested with sycamore, Christ's-thorn trees and cactus. One of the old roads had been paved.

== See also ==
- Battles of the Separation Corridor

== Bibliography ==
- Barron, J.B., ed. (1923). Palestine: Report and General Abstracts of the Census of 1922. Government of Palestine.
- Conder, C.R.; Kitchener, H.H. (1883). The Survey of Western Palestine: Memoirs of the Topography, Orography, Hydrography, and Archaeology. Vol. 3. London: Committee of the Palestine Exploration Fund.
- Department of Statistics (1945). Village Statistics, April, 1945. Government of Palestine.
- Hadawi, S. (1970). Village Statistics of 1945: A Classification of Land and Area ownership in Palestine. Palestine Liberation Organization Research Center.
- Hartmann, M. (1883). "Die Ortschaftenliste des Liwa Jerusalem in dem turkeschen Staatskalender dur Syrien auf das Jahr 1288 der Flucht (1871)". Zeitschrift des Deutschen Palästina-Vereins. 6: 102–149.
- Khalidi, W. (1992). All That Remains: The Palestinian Villages Occupied and Depopulated by Israel in 1948. Washington D.C.: Institute for Palestine Studies. ISBN 0-88728-224-5.
- Mills, E., ed. (1932). Census of Palestine 1931. Population of Villages, Towns and Administrative Areas. Jerusalem: Government of Palestine.
- Morris, B. (2004). The Birth of the Palestinian Refugee Problem Revisited. Cambridge University Press. ISBN 978-0-521-00967-6.
- Palmer, E.H. (1881). The Survey of Western Palestine: Arabic and English Name Lists Collected During the Survey by Lieutenants Conder and Kitchener, R. E. Transliterated and Explained by E.H. Palmer. Committee of the Palestine Exploration Fund.
- Robinson, E.; Smith, E. (1841). Biblical Researches in Palestine, Mount Sinai and Arabia Petraea: A Journal of Travels in the year 1838. Vol. 3. Boston: Crocker & Brewster.
- Socin, A. (1879). "Alphabetisches Verzeichniss von Ortschaften des Paschalik Jerusalem". Zeitschrift des Deutschen Palästina-Vereins. 2: 135–163.
- Tal, D. (2004). War in Palestine, 1948: Israeli and Arab Strategy and Diplomacy. Routledge. ISBN 0-7146-5275-X.
