= Operation Yoav =

1948 Israeli military action

Operation Yoav (also called Operation Ten Plagues or Operation Yo'av) was an Israeli military operation carried out from 15–22 October 1948 in the Negev Desert, during the 1948 Arab–Israeli War. Its goal was to drive a wedge between the Egyptian forces along the coast and the Beersheba–Hebron–Jerusalem road, and ultimately to conquer the whole Negev. Operation Yoav was headed by the Southern Front commander Yigal Allon. The operation was named after Yitzhak Dubno, codenamed "Yoav" by his commanders in the Palmach. Dubno, a senior Palmach officer, was charged with planning and leading the defense of the kibbutzim Negba and Yad Mordechai. Dubno was killed in an air raid on Kibbutz Negba shortly after Egyptian forces began their offensive on Israel's southern front.

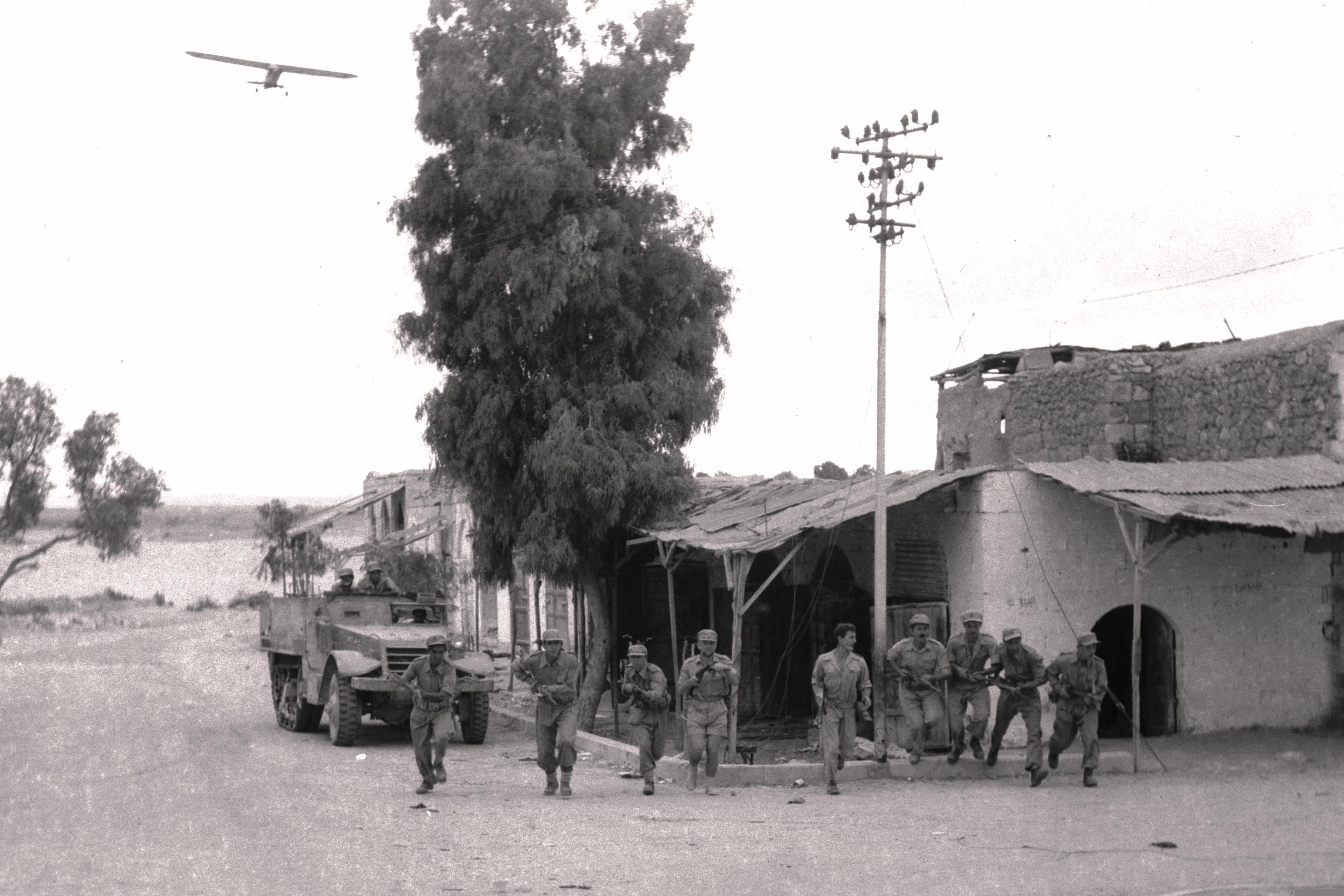
Israeli soldiers capturing Beersheba

== Background ==
In the central and northern parts of Palestine, the Israelis had managed to make substantial territorial gains before the second truce of the war went into effect. But the southern Negev Desert, allocated to a Jewish state in the 1947 United Nations Partition Plan for Palestine, was still under Egyptian control. Despite the second truce, the Egyptians denied Jewish convoys passage through to the Negev, and captured positions beyond the truce demarcation lines.

Operation Ten Plagues (after the punishment God sent to the Egyptians for holding the Israelis captive in the Hebrew Bible) was made and approved at a Cabinet Session 6 October 1948. The operation came after at 14 October 1948 when a convoy consisting of 16 trucks was fired on as it passed through Egyptian positions.

Ralph Bunche, who had become UN mediator after the assassination of Count Folke Bernadotte, said:

[The Israeli] military action of the last few days has been on a scale which could only be undertaken after considerable preparation, and could scarcely be explained as simple retaliatory action for an attack on an [Israeli] convoy.

The Operation coincided with Operation Ha-Har, 18–24 October, in which the Harel and Etzioni Brigades attacked Egyptian controlled villages along the Jerusalem Corridor.

== History ==
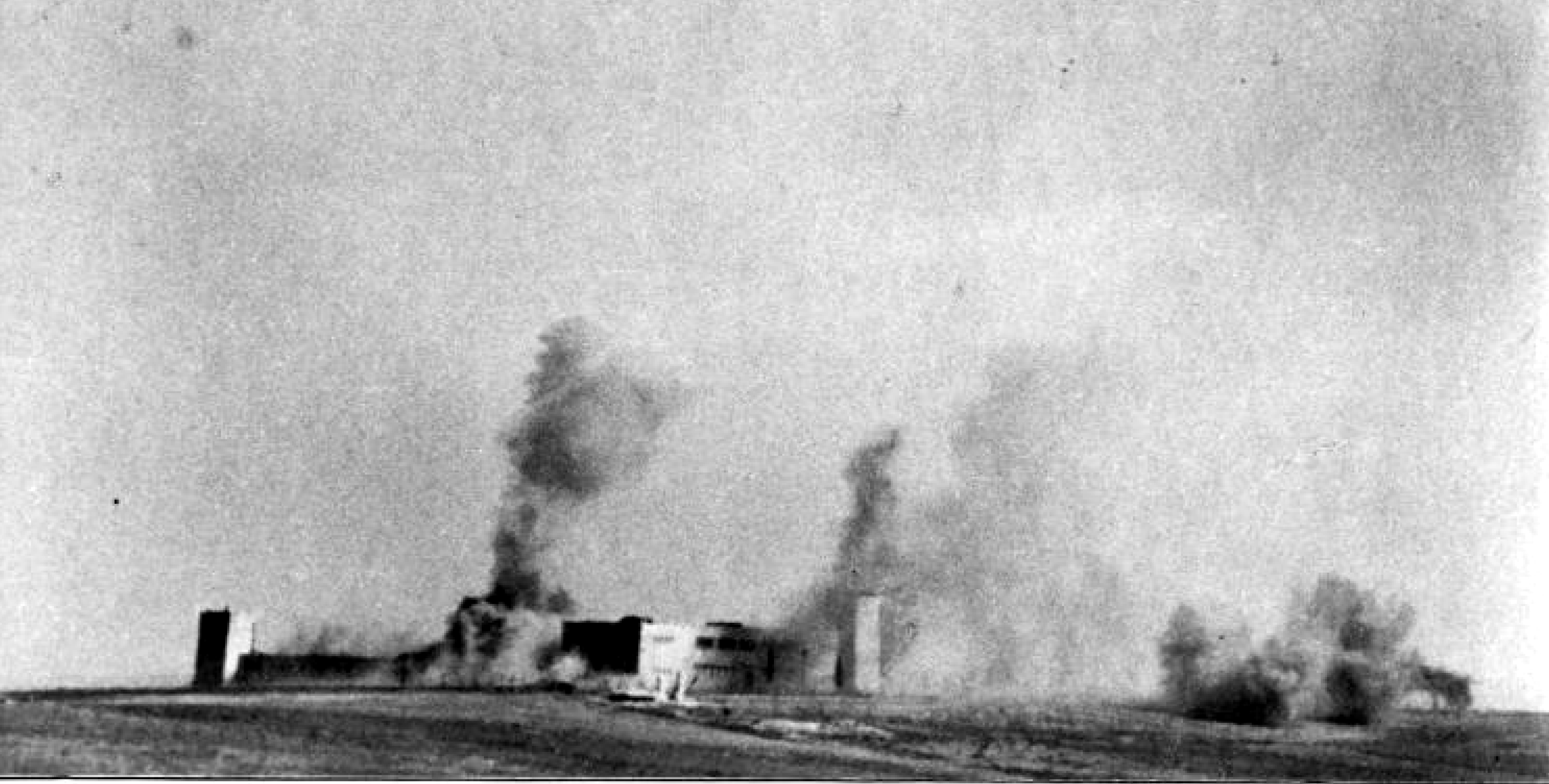
The Iraq Suwaydan bombardment, 9 November 1948.

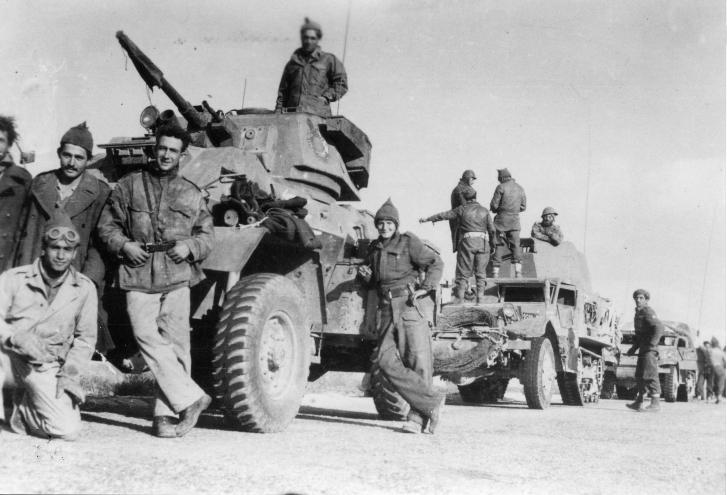
Negev brigade

The Israeli forces consisted of three infantry brigades, the Negev Brigade, the Givati Brigade under the command of Abraham "Kiki" Elkin, and the Yiftach Brigade, an armored battalion from the 8th Armored Brigade and the largest artillery formation that had been available to the IDF at the time. On October 18 the Oded Brigade also joined in the operation. In the evening of October 15 the Israeli Air Force bombed Gaza, al-Majdal (now Ashkelon), Beersheba and Beit Hanoun. Some targets were bombed again during the following two nights. A battalion of the Yiftach Brigade mined the railroad between El-Arish and Rafah and various roads in the Gaza area, also driving a wedge into the road. Two battalions of the Givati Brigade drove south east of Iraq al-Manshiyya (now Kiryat Gat), thus cutting the road between al-Faluja and Bayt Jibrin. Beit Jibrin was captured by the 52 Battalion of Givati and the 8th Brigade on October 23.

In the early morning hours of October 21, following two nights of air raids, the Negev Brigade and 8th Armored Brigade attacked Beersheba from the west. Another force joined them from the north. The Egyptian army garrison consisted of 500 soldiers with some light artillery. They put up some resistance for five hours before surrendering. The conquest of Beersheba was named Operation Moshe, after Moshe Albert, who fell defending the besieged Beit Eshel.

On 29 October soldiers from the 8th Brigade carried out a massacre at al-Dawayima, killing 80-200+ Palestinians.

Towards the end of the operation General Allon sought permission to launch an attack on the Hebron hills and into the Jericho valley. David Ben-Gurion refused, mainly due to fears that this would lead to British involvement.

The United Nations Refugee Relief Project reported that the Gaza Strip's refugee population had jumped from 100,000 to 230,000 as a result of Operation Yoav. This figure does not include those who fled to the Hebron Hills.

== Captured Arab villages ==
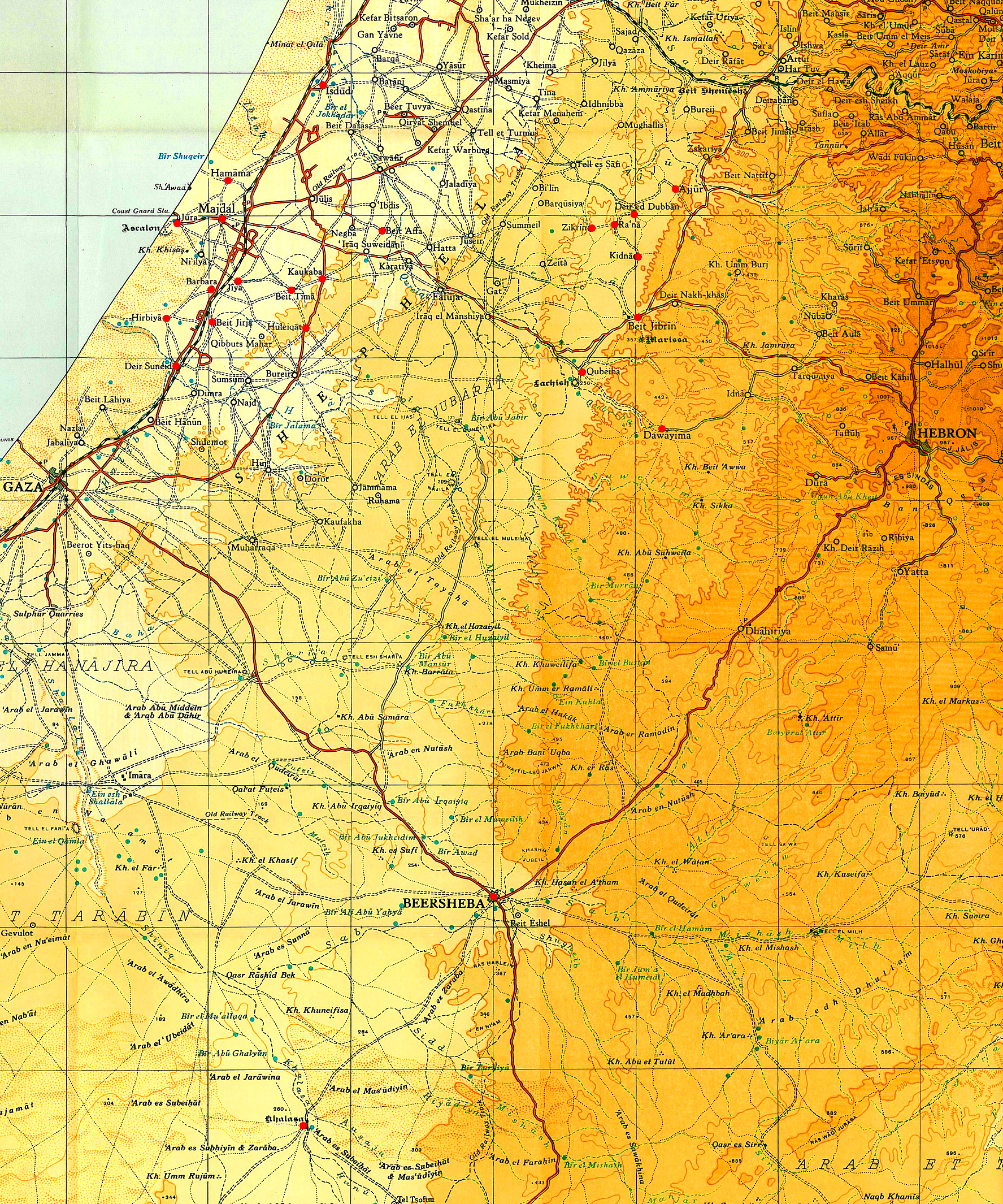
Villages and towns captured during Operation Yoav, October 1948.

Name	Population (1944/45)	Date	Defending forces	Brigade	notes
Bayt 'Affa	700	2nd half of October 1948	Egyptian army	n/a	First captured by Giv'ati Brigade in July but only held for a few days. Population fled and village destroyed.
Bayt Tima	1,060	11/19 October	n/a but a Saudi company here in early July as well as Palestinian Militia.	Givati Brigade	Bombarded by planes and artillery prior to capture. Population fled and village destroyed.
Hulayqat	420	19 October	Egyptian Army:600 regular soldiers with '100 killed'	Givati Brigade	Captured and held by the Israeli army following Operation Barak. Retaken by Egyptians on 7 July. Some villagers returned but fled in October. Village destroyed.
Kawkaba	680	20 October	Saudi Company present in June	Givati Brigade	On front line between Egyptians and Israelis. Changed hands several times during the summer. Villagers fled and buildings destroyed.
Beersheba	5,570	21 October	Egyptian Army	8th Armored Brigade, Negev Brigade	Arabs expelled, 10 km radius exclusion zone enforced on Bedouin.
Ra'na	190	22–23 October	n/a	Givati Brigade	Those villagers who remained expelled and village destroyed.
Zikrin	960	22–23 October	n/a	Givati Brigade	depopulated and village destroyed.
Kidna	450	22–23 October	Arab Liberation Army, Muslim Brotherhood volunteers and local militia.	Givati Brigade	depopulated and village destroyed.
'Ajjur	3,730	23 October	n/a	4th Battalion, Givati Brigade	depopulated, most inhabitants left after earlier attacks. Town destroyed.
Dayr al-Dubban	730	23–24 October	none	Givati Brigade	Most of villagers fled, some expelled. Village destroyed.
Bayt Jibrin	2,430	24 October	Egyptian Army unit in police fort.	Givati Brigade	Bombed from the air on 18 October and on several subsequent occasions. Town depopulated but not all buildings destroyed.
Al-Qubayba	1,060	28 October	none	Givati or Harel Brigade	Population fled and village destroyed.
Isdud	4,910 including 290 Jews	28 October	Egyptians withdrew	Givati Brigade	Bombed for three nights by the IAF. 300 villagers who remained expelled. Village destroyed.
al-Dawayima	3,710	29 October	no organized defense	89th Battalion, 8th Brigade	Village destroyed.
Dayr Sunayd	730	Late October	Egyptian Army, 9th Battalion including Gamal Abdel Nasser	n/a	Bombed from air during early stages of operation. Villagers fled and village destroyed.
Al-Khalasa	Azazima Bedouin	End of October	Egyptian Army	Negev Brigade	Possibly captured in May. Destroyed.
Hamama	5,070 including 60 Jews	4 November	Egyptian Army	Givati Brigade	Occupants fled or expelled. Village destroyed in operation on 30 November.
Al-Jiyya	1,230	4 November	n/a	Givati Brigade	Villagers expelled and village destroyed.
Al-Jura	2,420	4 November	no resistance	Givati Brigade	villagers expelled and village destroyed.
al-Majdal	9,910	4 November	Egyptian Army	Givati Brigade, Negev Brigade, Yiftach Brigade	Townspeople who had remained or returned finally expelled in 1950.
Hiribya	2,300 including 60 Jews	early November	Egyptian Army	n/a	Another location bombed from air. Population fled or expelled, buildings destroyed.
Bayt Jirja	940	4–5 November	n/a	Givati Brigade, Negev Brigade, Yiftach Brigade	population fled or expelled, village destroyed.
Barbara	2,410	5 November	n/a	n/a	Bombed from air during early stage of operation. Depopulated and town destroyed.

== Participating brigades ==
- 8th Armored Brigade
- Givati Brigade
- Negev Brigade
- Oded Brigade
- Yiftach Brigade

== See also ==
- Israeli naval campaign in Operation Yoav
- List of battles and operations in the 1948 Palestine war
- Depopulated Palestinian locations in Israel
- Territory acquired during Israel's war of independence
- Yahya Sinwar and Ahmed Yassin
