= Givati Brigade =

Israeli military infantry brigade

84th "Givati" Brigade
- חֲטִיבַת גִּבְעָתִי
- Brigade patch
- Active: 1947–1948, 1982–present
- Country: Israel
- Branch: Israeli Ground Forces
- Type: Infantry
- Part of: 162nd Armor Division, Israeli Southern Command
- Mottos: "With me to Givati", "Any Place, Any Time, Any Mission", "The most combatant, Givati"
- Colors: Purple berets, purple and white flag
- March: "Mi She-Halam Givati" ("Those who dreamt Givati")
- Mascot: Fox
- Engagements: 1947–1949 Palestine war (Operation Nachshon, Operation Yoav); First Intifada; Second Intifada (Operation Rainbow, Operation Days of Penitence); 2006 Lebanon War; Operation Summer Rains; Operation Hot Winter; Gaza War; Operation Protective Edge; Gaza war (Invasion of the Gaza Strip)

Commanders
- Current commander: Colonel Liron Betiteo
- Notable commanders: Effi Eitam, Imad Fares, Amos Yarkoni, Ofer Winter

Insignia
- Flag

The "Givati" Brigade (Hebrew: חֲטִיבַת גִּבְעָתִי, lit. '"Hill Brigade" or "Highland Brigade"') is the name of an Israel Defense Forces brigade. Originally it was used by the 5th Brigade, an infantry brigade formed in 1947 and shut down. In 1983 it was reclaimed by the newly formed 84th Brigade.

Givati soldiers are designated by purple berets. The Brigade's symbol is the fox, alluding to Shualei Shimshon (שועלי שמשון, lit. "Samson's Foxes"), a unit in the 1948 Arab–Israeli War.

== Units of the 84th Brigade ==
- 84th Infantry Brigade "Givati"
  - 424th Infantry Battalion "Shaked/Almond"
  - 432nd Infantry Battalion "Tzabar/Cactus"
  - 435th Infantry Battalion "Rotem/Broom"
    - incl. Infantry Company "Tomer/Date" – first observant Ultra-Orthodox–only unit in the IDF
  - (846th) Patrol Battalion "Shualey Shimshon/Samson's Foxes"
  - 607th Combat Engineering Battalion
  - 5084th Logistics Battalion
  - 7497th Signals Company "Maor/myrrh"

== History ==
Emblem of the brigade in 1948

Givati Brigade insignia

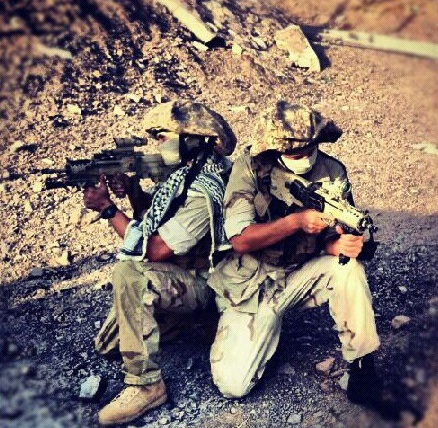
"Rimon" (Pomegranate) special operations unit

=== 1940s-1950s ===
Givati was formed in December 1947 and placed under the command of Shimon Avidan. At the start of the 1948 Palestine war, the brigade was charged with operations in the central region of Israel, participating in operations Hametz, Barak and Pleshet.

During Operation Barak, the brigade perpetrated a massacre in the village of Abu Shusha, killing around 60 residents.

As the war entered its second stage, Givati became the 5th Brigade, was moved to the south, and concentrated mainly around Gedera, Gan Yavne and Be'er Tuvia. One battalion fought on the Jerusalem front, participating in Operation Nachshon and the Battles of Latrun.

When Israel declared independence, Givati consisted of 5 battalions, with notable commanders such as Jehuda Wallach (51st Battalion), Ya'akov Pri (52nd Battalion), Yitzhak Pundak (53rd Battalion), Tzvi Tzur (54th Battalion) and Eitan Livni (55th Battalion). A sixth battalion (the 57th) was founded on May 30, 1948 from Irgun veterans, in preparation for Operation Pleshet. The brigade or parts thereof subsequently participated in the Battle of Nitzanim, Operation An-Far, Operation Yoav, etc.

In 1956 it was converted into a reserve brigade in 1956 and its 51st "HaBokim HaRishonim" infantry battalion transferred to the Golani Brigade.The reserve brigade maintained the number 5, but the name Givati was no longer in use.

=== 1980s ===
In 1983 the IDF established a mechanized infantry brigade, and named it Givati after the historic brigade from the 1940s and 1950s. Originally, it was intended that the Brigade serve as marines, but this did not materialize. In 1986 the brigade's purple beret was officially approved. Since 1999 it serves under Israel's Southern Command.

=== 2002–2003 ===
The Givati Brigade served under the Southern Command and was deployed in the Gaza Strip. The brigade was awarded a medal of honor for its service in the Gaza Strip during the last two years of the Al-Aqsa Intifada, when under the command of Imad Fares. Under Fares' command, Givati carried out thousands of operations in the Gaza Strip.

=== 2004 ===
The brigade continued its operations in the Gaza Strip under the command of Eyal Eisenberg and the new head of Southern Command, Dan Harel. Givati's Recon Battalion, the Dolev combat engineering platoon and the Bedouin scouts battalion, won a recommendation of honor, mainly for their activities against Rafah's tunnels. Givati forces, combined with a special combat engineering tunnels unit, and IDF Caterpillar D9 armoured bulldozers, managed to suppress most of Rafah's tunnels.

On May 11 and May 12, 2004, two armored personnel carriers of Givati's Dolev engineering battalion were destroyed by Palestinian militants. The two separate skirmishes, in Gaza City's Zeitoun neighbourhood and the Philadelphi Route near Rafah and the Egyptian border, claimed the lives of 11 soldiers. Islamic Jihad militants captured some of the remains, causing outrage in Israel. Following international pressure and further Israeli operations in Zeitoun, the bodies of soldiers were returned to Israel.

In the Zeitoun incident, UNRWA ambulances were used as transport by healthy Palestinian militants. In an interview with Haaretz, Israel's Defense Minister Shaul Mofaz also said that UNRWA's ambulances were used by Palestinian militants in order to bring some of the remains of IDF soldiers killed in Zaitoun neighbourhood in Gaza on May 11, 2004. UNRWA has described the May 11 incident as a hijacking.

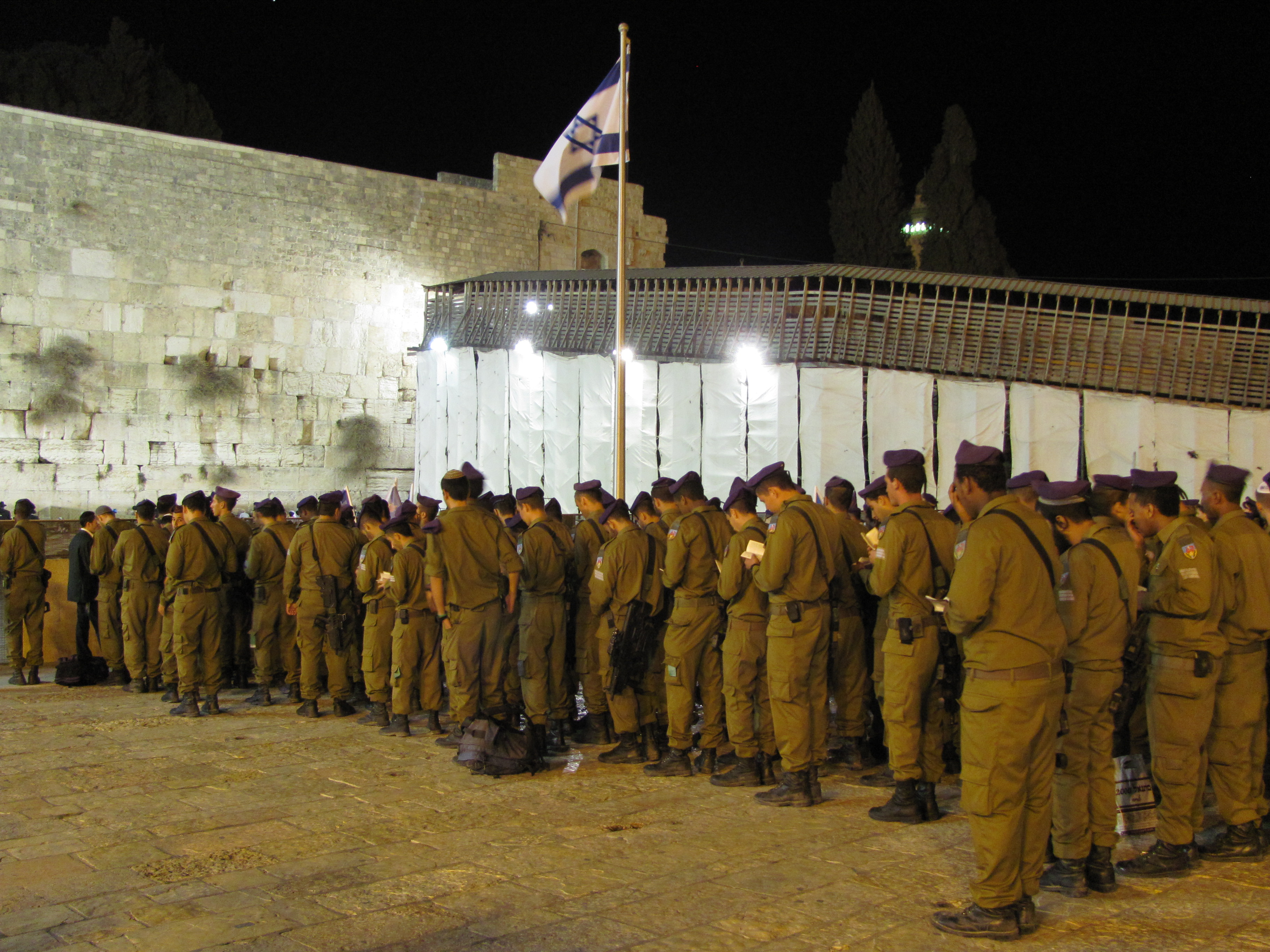
Members of the Givati Brigade praying at the Western Wall, 2010

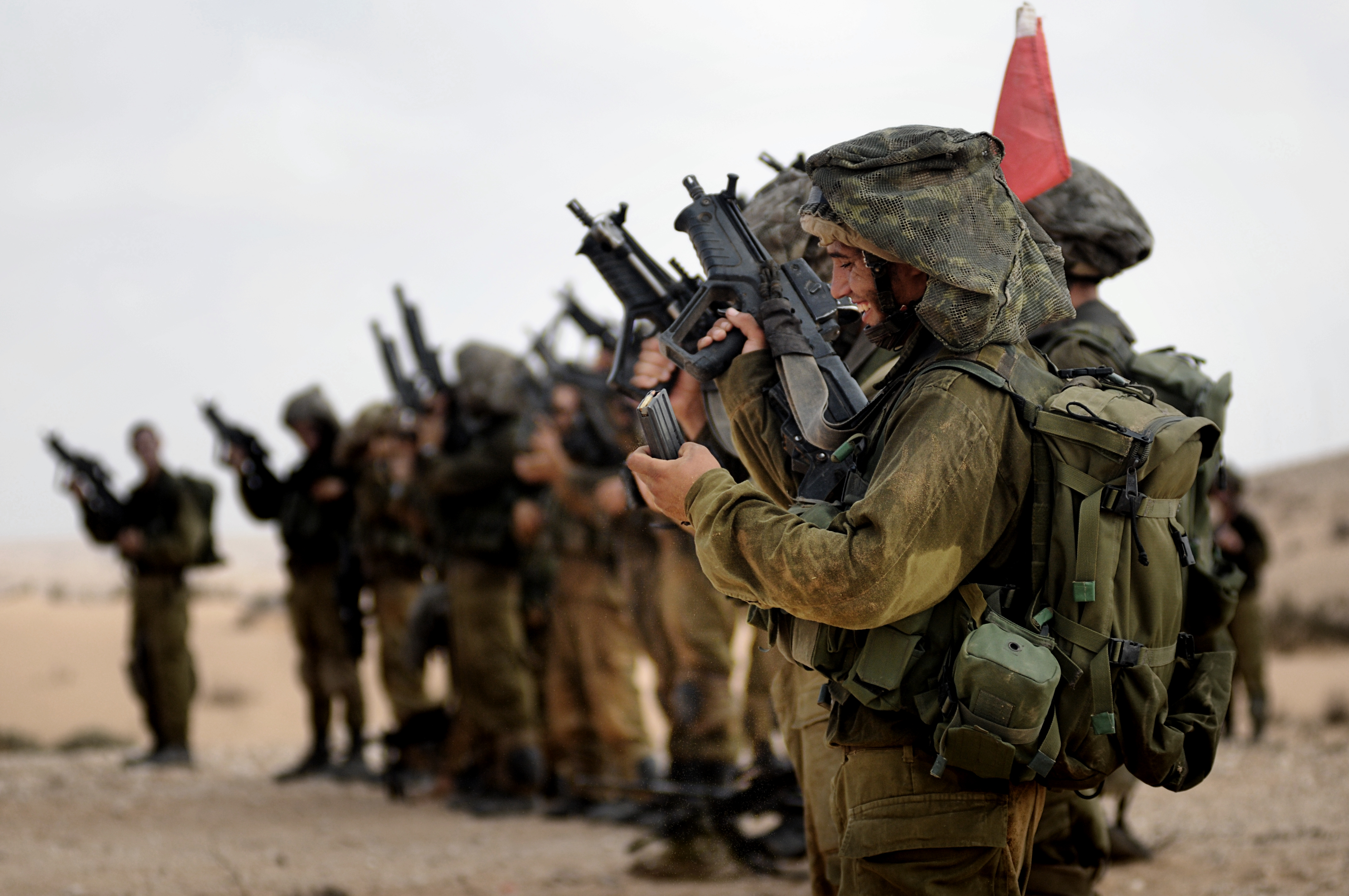
The reconnaissance company of the Givati Brigade during an exercise, 2009

After two more soldiers were killed in Rafah, Israel launched Operation Rainbow. This involved Givati forces reinforced by Golani Brigade soldiers with IDF Achzarit HAPCs, a battalion of officers from the class-commanders school and several IDF Caterpillar D9 armoured bulldozers. The stated aim of Operation Rainbow was to destroy the terror infrastructure of Rafah, destroy smuggling tunnels and stop illegal missile shipment.

The brigade's Shaked battalion, under the command of a Lt. Col. "Ofer" (surname not publicized) was rocked by scandals in the second half of 2004 while stationed in the southern Gaza Strip. Two of the battalion's four company commanders were removed, although one was later exonerated. Captain "R", a Druze officer was tried for killing Iman al-Hams, a 13-year-old Palestinian girl, in Rafah in October 2004. Captain "R" was acquitted of all charges by a military court. Another officer, Captain "N", was removed after Palestinian gunmen infiltrated the Morag settlement and killed three soldiers in September 2004.

=== 2005 ===
On September 12, the Givati Brigade left the Gaza Strip as part of Israel's unilateral disengagement plan, one month after the forceful removal of approximately 8,000 Jewish settlers living in 22 communities in the Strip. It marked an end to the 38 year IDF presence in the Gaza Strip. Today, two battalions are stationed outside the Strip, while the third battalion is positioned on the northern border.

=== 2006 ===
On June 27, in response to Hamas' kidnapping of Corporal Gilad Shalit, the IDF started an offensive in the Gaza Strip to repel the continuous rockets being fired into the Israeli town outside of Gaza and to pressure Hamas to release Shalit. Givati, together with the Golani Brigade, Engineering Corps and the Armored Corps, participated in Operation "Summer Rains." However, Israel failed to achieve the release of Shalit, and a November 26 ceasefire agreement between Israel and the Palestinian groups forced Israel to withdraw its forces.

Captain "R", the former Misayat Shaked company commander who was accused in "confirming kill" of 13-year-old Iman al-Hams in Rafah in October 2004, and was acquitted in court, received NIS 80,000 in compensation from the state, according to a December 14 Ha'aretz report.

Givati was the first brigade to receive the new IMI Tavor TAR-21 assault rifle, in August 2006.

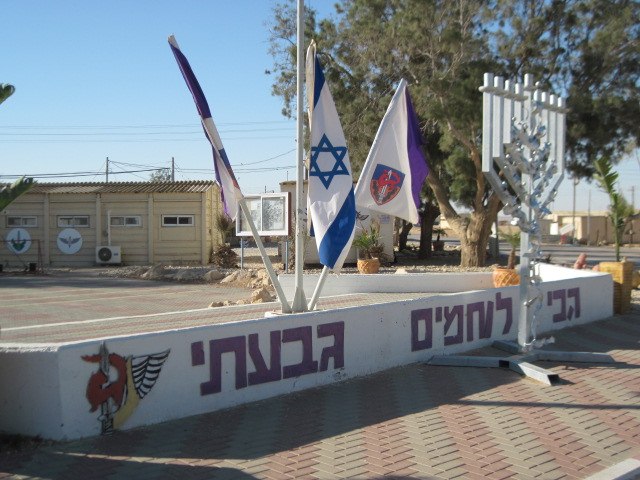
Flagstaff at basic training base

=== 2007 ===
As of 2007, the Givati brigade is organized into three main battalions: Shaked, Tzabar, and Rotem, in addition to associated reconnaissance, engineering, and other units.

=== 2008 ===
The Givati Brigade participated in Operation Hot Winter. It also participated in the ground phase of Operation Cast Lead, when of all IDF brigades, it penetrated deepest into Gaza City. The brigade's reconnaissance battalion entered the Tel el-Hawa neighborhood in search of Hamas operatives two days before the cease fire went into effect. An estimated 40 Palestinian operatives were killed as dozens of apartments were swept. Hamas reportedly decided to fire the commander of the Gaza City Brigade after its forces fought against Givati.

=== 2012 ===
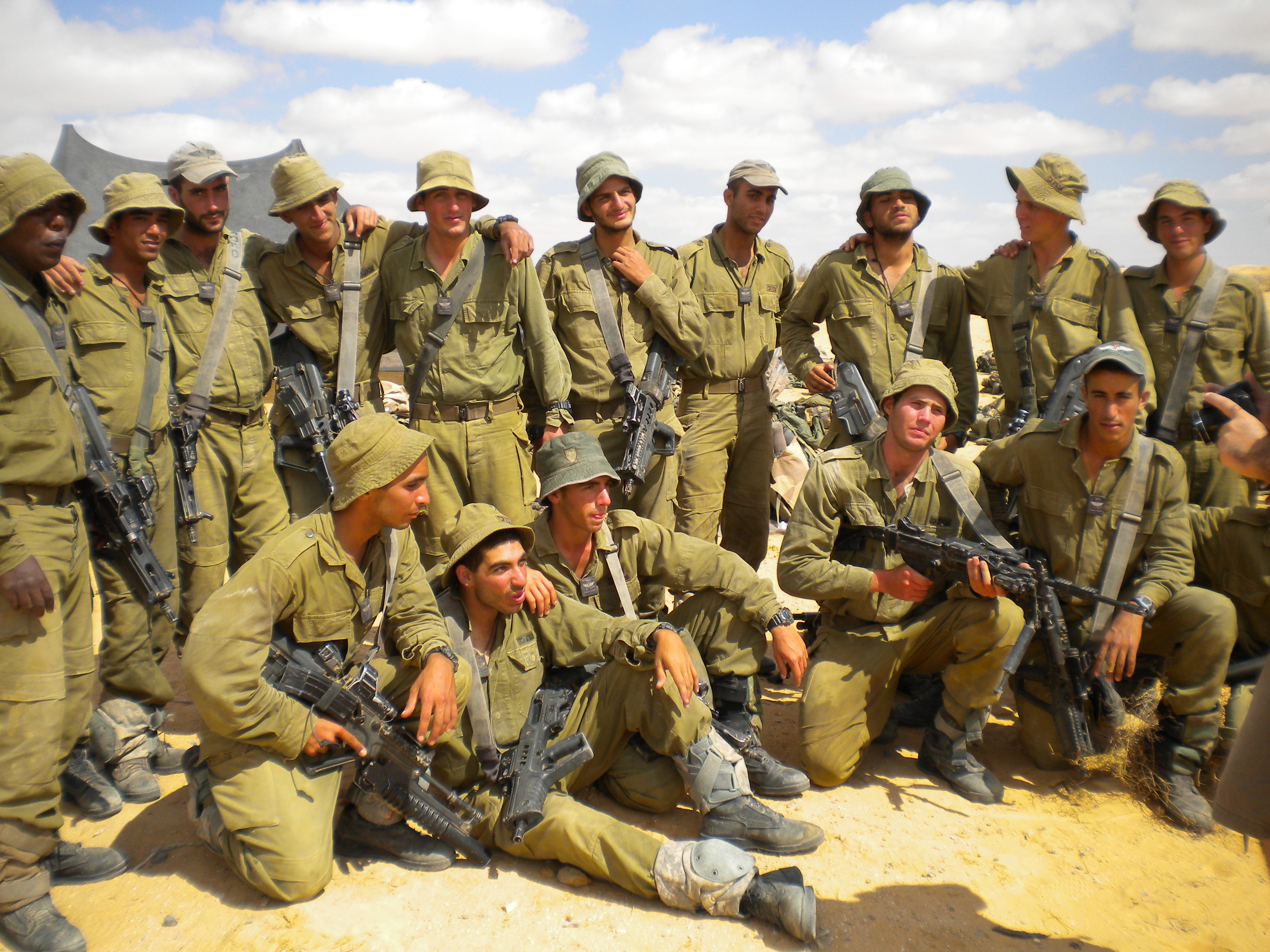
Givati soldiers in 2011

In November 2012, the Givati Brigade participated in Operation Pillar of Defense.

=== 2014 ===
In the summer of 2014, the Givati Brigade participated in the Israeli offensive Operation Protective Edge. During a 72-hour ceasefire, elements of the brigade's reconnaissance company engaged in a brief skirmish with Hamas militants in the southern Gazan city of Rafah, near the border with Egypt. Three soldiers, including the commander, Benaya Sarel, of the Givati Reconnaissance Company (Sayeret Givati), were killed in the ensuing firefight subsequently dubbed "Black Friday." Lieutenant Hadar Goldin was captured by Hamas militants and taken into a tunnel, and the assistant company commander took a small group of soldiers with him into the tunnel in an ultimately unsuccessful attempt to rescue Goldin.

After learning of Goldin's capture, the IDF initiated the Hannibal Directive and carried out a relentless air and ground attack on residential areas of Rafah. In the summer of 2015, a United Nations independent commission inquiry, as well as a joint report by Amnesty International and Forensic Architecture, found that Israel's indiscriminate violence against all human life on Black Friday amounted to war crimes. The reports detail the massive Israeli bombardment that killed between 135 and 200 Palestinian civilians, including 75 children.

The IDF Rabbinate later declared Goldin deceased for the purposes of Jewish burial and grieving rituals and buried the remains. The assistant company commander was later awarded Israel's highest military honor, and the soldiers that accompanied him into the tunnel were also awarded military commendations. The Givati Brigade was the most highly decorated brigade in the IDF in 2014.

=== 2015 ===
In January 2015, a convoy belonging to the Tsabar Battalion of the Givati Brigade was attacked by Hezbollah in Shebaa Farms.

=== 2022 ===
In November 2022, the Givati Brigade was involved in "a series of incidents" of alleged abuses towards civilians in Jerusalem and the West Bank. Within the space of a few weeks, Givati Brigade soldiers were accused of spitting at an Armenian Christian archbishop leading a pilgrimage (two soldiers were detained by police), beating Israeli human rights activists in Hebron (two soldiers were suspended), and assaulting a Palestinian man (three soldiers were suspended). While IDF Chief of Staff Aviv Kohavi contended that "Incidents such as these tarnish the unit in which the soldier serves, the IDF and the State of Israel," Israeli MK and national security minister-designate Itamar Ben-Gvir urged the IDF to "think twice" about whether to punish the soldiers, questioning whether they had been "provoked" and contending that disciplining them "weakens the hands of the soldiers and does not strengthen them in the fight against terrorism".

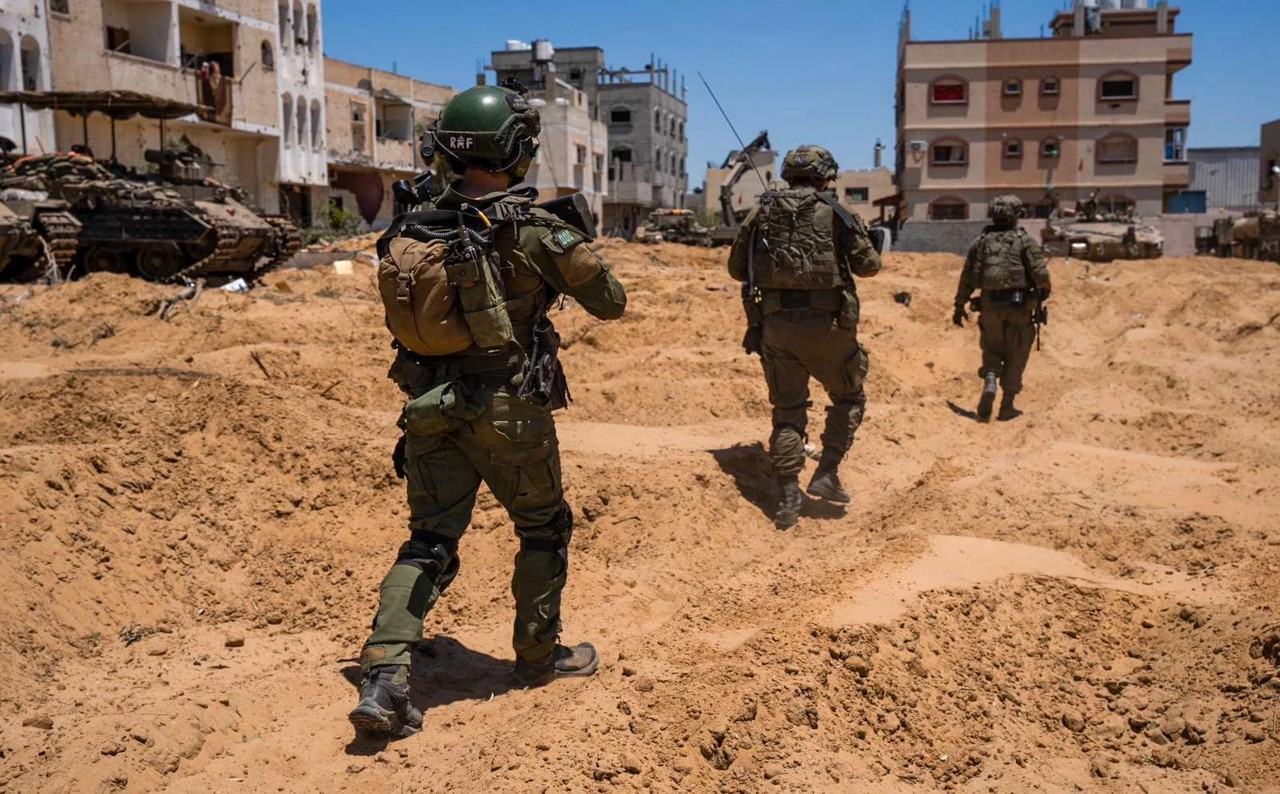
Givati Brigade in Gaza in May 2024

=== 2023 ===
The Givati Brigade lost 89 soldiers and commanders during the war, including on the October 7 attacks.

== See also ==
- History of the Israel Defense Forces
- List of battles and operations in the 1948 Palestine war
- Mechinat Rabin
- Hannibal Directive
