= Operation Shmone =

Israeli capture of Egyptian police fort, 1948

Coordinates: 31°38′53.24″N 34°40′55.95″E

- Part of 1948 Arab–Israeli War
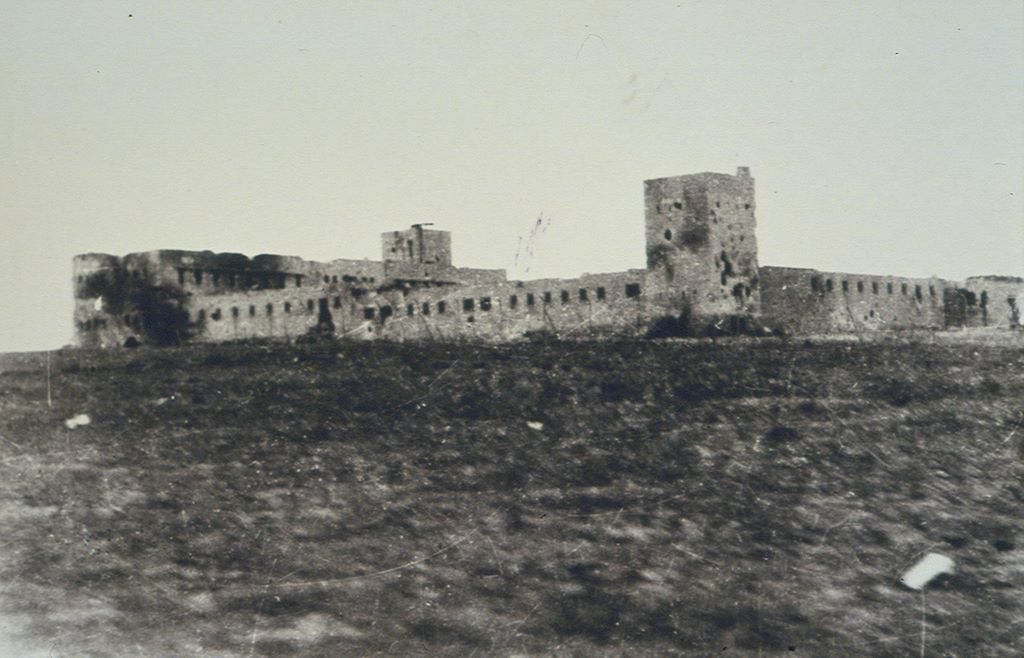
- The Iraq Suwaydan police fort
Date	9 November 1948
Location	Givati Junction, Israel
Result	Israeli victory

Belligerents
Israel (IDF)	Egypt

Commanders and leaders
Yitzhak Sadeh (8th Brig.)	
- Iraq Suwaydan

Operation Shmone (Hebrew: מִבְצָע שְׁמוֹנֶה, Mivtza Shmone, lit. Eight) was an Israeli military operation conducted against the Egyptian-held police fort of Iraq Suwaydan in the 1948 Arab–Israeli War. The battle was fought between the Israel Defense Forces and the Egyptian Army on 9 November 1948, and ended in an Israeli victory, following numerous previous Israeli attempts to capture the fort, two of them in Operation Yoav just weeks before.

The Israeli 8th and Givati brigades attacked the fort in broad daylight following a heavy artillery barrage. After a hole was blown through the wall of the fort, the Egyptian forces surrendered. The capture of the fort led to the Egyptian evacuation of Bayt 'Affa and other nearby positions, reducing the besieged Fallujah Pocket to the villages of Fallujah and Iraq al-Manshiyya.

== Background ==
The Iraq Suwaydan police fort was built along with the other British Tegart forts in the wake of the 1936–1939 Arab revolt in Palestine. It occupied a strategic location overlooking the Majdal–Hebron road and the junction with the internal Negev road. When the British withdrew from the area in May 1948, the fort was handed over to Muslim Brotherhood forces. It was a major obstacle to Israeli transportation to the Negev enclave and served as a forward base against Israeli positions in the area, including kibbutz Negba. The Israelis nicknamed the fort "The Monster on the Hill".

== Attempts to capture the fort ==
Eight attempts were made to capture the Iraq Suwaydan police fort. After 7 failed attempts (5 by the Givati brigade, and 2 by the Negev Brigade), the demolitions team of the 89th battalion successfully broke into the police fort. This led to the surrender of the Egyptian force manning the fort.

=== First attempt ===
In the framework of the Hagana's Plan Dalet, which was prepared toward the end of the British Mandate, the Givati Brigade was tasked with capturing the Tegart forts located in its area of operations, immediately upon the British departure. On 17 April 1948 the Givati 53rd Battalion, commanded by Yitzhak Pundak, took control of the Qatra police station near Gedera using intimidation only. Pundak wished to use the same methods to capture the Iraq Suwaydan police fort, but encountered opposition from the military commander of Kibbutz Negba, Yitzhak Dubno, who was supported by Givati brigade commander Shimon Avidan.

On 12 May Dubno sent a report by telegram to the commander of the 53rd Battalion that:

At 18:30 this evening, the Iraq Suwaydan police fort was captured by Egyptian forces, in cooperation with a number of armed villagers. The British army made secret preparations for their departure from the police fort, and signalled the end of their preparations to the Arabs by lighting a fire bomb. After the signal, the garage doors opened and several dozens of military vehicles left the building in the direction of al-Majdal. At that moment, some 40 Egyptians slipped from the nearby hill into the building and seized positions within.

— Avraham Eilon, Hativat Giva'ti be-Milhemet ha-Komemiut [Givati Brigade in the War of Independence] (Tel Aviv, 1959), 496 (in Hebrew)

The following day, the commander of the 53rd Battalion received information from Hagana intelligence that the Egyptian army had left the fort, which was now in the hands of local villagers, and that during the day it was manned by a symbolic force of six sentries.

On 13 May, during Operation Barak, after the capture of the villages of Burayr and Hulayqat by the Second Battalion of the Negev Brigade, battalion commander Moshe Netzer suggested taking advantage of the opportunity to continue northward with his battalion and attack the fortress of Iraq Suwaydan. Oded Messer, the operations officer of the Negev Brigade, did not give his approval to the operation. Thus, this opportunity to capture the fortress with relative ease may have been missed.

While most of the battalions of the Givati Brigade were ordered to move to the Latrun area in order to participate in Operation Maccabi, the 53rd remained in the south to regroup after the night battle at Bayt Daras. In light of the situation of the brigade and the battalion, and in light of the erroneous information received from Haganah intelligence, the battalion commander sent one armored platoon to seize the police building during daylight on 14 May. This weak attack was stopped without difficulty by the powerful Egyptian force occupying the fortress.

=== Second attempt ===
On the night of 18–19 May the Givati 53rd and 54th battalions made a second attempt to conquer the fortress. The attack, which took place from the north, failed due to faulty planning: out of the attacking company, only one platoon was assigned for breaching, while the rest were given the task of closing and securing the access routes. A company from the 54th Battalion secured the outer perimeter. Paralyzing fire from the mortars and machine guns did not succeed in suppressing the fire of the defending forces. When the attacking troops approached the fort, they set off powerful illumination mines, losing the element of surprise. It was therefore decided to order a withdrawal.

=== Third attempt ===
On the night of 21–22 May a third attempt was made to capture the fortress. Three breaching forces were established, but they were not concentrated into a unified effort. At dawn, the order was given to withdraw, after it became clear that the attacking forces had received casualties: 40 wounded and 3 dead.

=== Fourth attempt ===
On the night of 10–11 June, just a few hours before the first truce of the war came into effect, a fourth attempt was made to conquer the police fort by the Negev Brigade. This time the attack came from the south. The breaching force advanced while supporting forces laid down suppressive fire against the defenders. The advancing force was spotted by the defenders as soon as it breached the first fence, and had to continue the assault under heavy fire. In the course of the battle, the attackers breached the first four fences, and a small team with breaching explosives slipped past the fifth fence. However, the sun was about to rise and the operation commanders, unaware of the extent of the progress made, gave the order to retreat. In addition, the demolitions soldiers accompanying the troops had been taken out of action by enemy fire. The forces withdrew from the field without detonating the explosives. In total, the Israeli casualties were 4 dead and 12 wounded, including two men killed by fire from enemy aircraft that had come to assist the defenders.

During their retreat, the Israeli soldiers noticed a number of Egyptian soldiers fleeing the field as well, but continued their own withdrawal. After the battle was over, the forces discovered that a transmission had been intercepted by Negev Brigade SIGINT forces in the course of the fighting. The commander defending the fort had reported to the Egyptian headquarters in Majdal that the Israeli attack had been too strong for him to withstand, and that his forces had begun a retreat from the fort. Technical problems with the communications equipment prevented this information from reaching the commanders and soldiers in the field. If the report had been received, it is likely that the fort could have been captured during this attack.

=== Fifth attempt ===
On the night of 8–9 July, on the eve of the end of the first truce, the IDF made preparations for Operation An-Far (short for Anti-Farouk), a two-brigade operation aimed at breaking into the besieged Negev region. The Negev Battalion was once again given the mission to capture the police fort. While the Givati Brigade attacked from the north and captured the villages of Bayt 'Affa and Iraq Suwaydan, a reinforced company of the Negev Brigade attacked the Iraq Suwaydan police fort from the south. The attack began after a long delay. The Negev Brigade force broke through four barbed wire fences, and then discovered an additional fifth fence surrounding the fort, which had been unknown to the attackers' intelligence. Dawn began to break before the fifth fence could be breached. A decision was taken to retreat, to avoid confronting the defending forces in daylight.

=== Sixth attempt ===
On the night of 19–20 October, three days after the beginning of Operation Yoav, the Givati Brigade made another attempt to take the police fort. The attacking force succeeded in breaching two barbed-wire fences, but during the attempt to break through the third fence it encountered heavy fire and was forced to retreat.

The commander of the 51st Battalion, Jehuda L. Wallach, wrote about the reason for the failure:

We did not know in advance that the building housed an Egyptian army company armed with a large number of machine guns, instead of just a "low morale platoon".

— Avraham Eilon, 'Hativat Givati Mul Hapolesh Hamitzri' (The Givati Brigade vs. the Egyptian invader), (1963), pp. 532.

=== Aerial assault ===
Two aircraft departed on a bombing sortie in the late afternoon of 20 October. The first plane, flown by Leonard Fitchett, managed to drop its bombs on the police compound but the second plane did not. The two planes were hit by powerful anti-aircraft fire from the fort. Fitchett's plane was forced to land in an area controlled by the Egyptian forces. His body was found after the crash, but the remains of the other two crew members were never found.

=== Seventh attempt ===
The 7th attack was planned after the interrogation of prisoners and deciphering of enemy documents. Two days after the failure of the sixth attempt, on the night of 21–22 October, Givati's 51st Battalion tried to break into the police fort, using flamethrowers installed on armored vehicles. The intruding force penetrated two of the five barbed-wire fences and approached within 50 meters from the south side of the fort, but its progress was halted by strong fire from a bunker outside the fort.

The commanding officer of the breaching force assigned a squadron under the command of PFC Ben-Zion Leitner to storm the bunker. The squadron remained paralyzed by the intense and unceasing enemy fire. Only Leitner stood up and stormed the source of the fire. Using grenades, he managed to stop the fire from the bunker, though he was critically wounded during the attack. Leitner received the nation's highest military decoration, the Hero of Israel citation (now the Medal of Valor), for this display of heroism.

The operation suffered from lack of coordination between the forces. The attack by C company was stopped without breaching the barbed wire. Meanwhile, an armored vehicle heavily laden with explosives (driven by volunteer Yosef 'Adawi) managed to reach a distance of 30 meters from the fortress. At this point, an anti-tank missile fired from the direction of the nearby villages (Iraq Suwaydan and Bayt 'Affa) hit the vehicle and caused the explosives to detonate. While the explosion was premature, it breached the barbed-wire fences and allowed the attacking force to reach the west side of the fort.

Though the attacking forces had made new progress against the fort defences, dawn was already breaking. The decision was made to retreat, rather than to take advantage of the situation and continue the attack. In this battle, the Givati 51st Battalion suffered casualties of 5 dead and 26 wounded.

== Eighth and final attempt ("Operation Shmone") ==
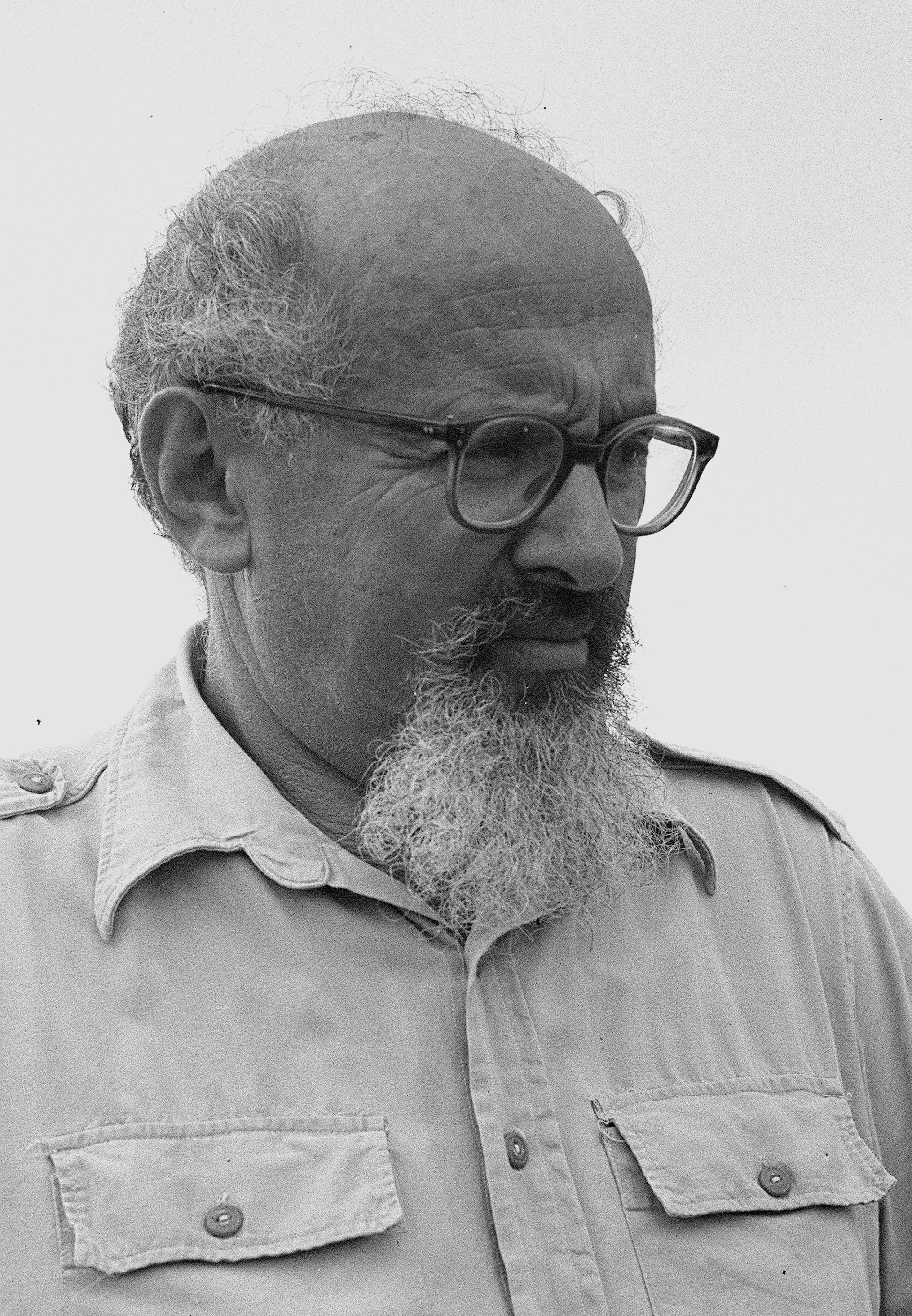
Yitzhak Sadeh

On 22 October, at the end of Operation Yoav, IDF forces succeeded in taking control of large areas of the Negev and breaking through to Beersheba. The capture of the Huleiqat and Bayt Jibrin outposts left the Egyptian 4th Brigade, under the command of Sudanese general Said Taha Bey, besieged in an enclave that was given the name of the "Faluja pocket". This enclave contained the villages Al-Faluja, Iraq al-Manshiyya, and the area of Iraq Suwaydan.

Despite the failed attacks on the Iraq Suwaydan police fort, the Israelis surrounded the Egyptian 4th Brigade in the area around Fallujah (referred to as the Fallujah Pocket), preventing outside reinforcement and resupply. This paved the way for Operation Shmone (literally, Eight), so named because it would be the 8th Israeli attack on the location.

The operation was proposed by the 8th Brigade commander, Yitzhak Sadeh, and carried out by the 8th Brigade. Sadeh conducted extensive research on the possibility of an attack, and concluded that the fort's defense was perfect and neither a surprise attack nor ingenious maneuvering would win the battle. He proposed to hold the attack during the day and use overwhelming firepower. The plan for the artillery attack was presented by the junior officer Dan Kessler. Three waves of attackers were made ready: two for the assault and one as operational reserve. Diversionary attacks would also take place in Iraq al-Manshiyya and the Iraq Suwaydan village.

=== Planning the operation ===
Analysis of the previous attempts to capture the fort led Yitzhak Sadeh to the conclusion that all seven previous attempts failed because the attacking forces did not initially try to paralyze enemy fire and destroy its sources, evidently due to the lack of the necessary means to do so in the Givati and Negev brigades. Yitzhak Sadeh, Shaul Yaffe, the deputy brigade commander, and Oded Messer, one of the senior officers in the brigade, wanted to attack the police building with tanks and half-track vehicles, but most of the access roads were exposed to anti-tank fire. After analyzing the terrain, Sadeh and his staff officers were able to find an access route to the fort from the northwest direction. A major advantage of this route was that it was not visible at all to the villages of Iraq Suwaydan and Bayt 'Affa, where the anti-tank guns were placed: the fort itself screened the access route from the villages.

In addition, Sadeh decided that the armored attack on the fortress would begin from the northwest toward sunset, when the setting sun would blind the Egyptian defenders in the fortress and make it difficult for them to stop the attack.

According to Sadeh's original plan, the attack would begin with an artillery bombardment by the 88th Battalion on the fort and the villages of Iraq Suwaydan and Beit 'Affa. Diversionary attacks on the neighboring villages would prevent reinforcement of the Egyptian forces in the fortress.

At a later time that afternoon, Company A of the 89th Battalion, accompanied by tanks from the 82nd Battalion under the command of Dov Tsesis, would move toward the target. The commando and armored units would move in two waves from the northwest, under the cover of the setting sun, and breach the police fort. If the attack failed, the brigade's operational reserve force would join the battle.

=== Battle ===
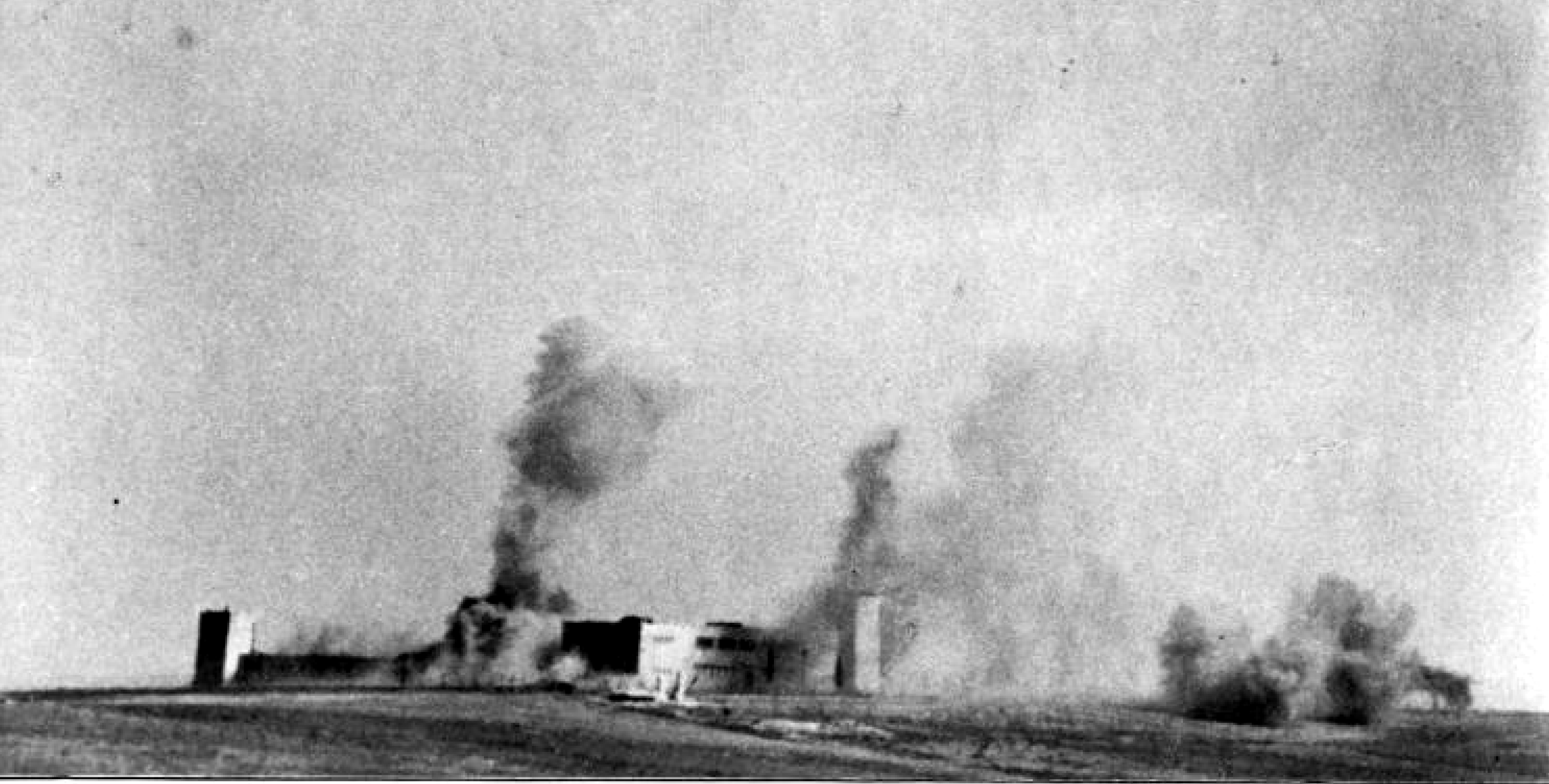
Israeli bombardment of the Iraq Suwaydan police fort

The operation started at 14:00 on 9 November 1948 with an artillery barrage from a number of units: two batteries of 75 mm Saint Chamond-Mondragón ("Cucaracha"), two batteries of 75 mm Krupp cannons, a number of 6 pounders and sixteen 120 mm mortars with delayed fuses. The cannons fired directly, in order to force the Egyptians to abandon their defensive posts and go inside the building. Machine gunners from Givati's 51st Battalion also positioned themselves to the west of the fort to provide cover fire.

The Israelis selected southwest as the direction of the main attack, in order to avoid the Egyptian-held village Bayt 'Affa, which was defended by 2–3 companies and a number of 6 pounders that could be used to fire at the Israelis. This also made sure that the setting sun would work against the Egyptian side, which would be blinded. The attacking force consisted of 8th Brigade forces: two tanks, two half-tracks armed with 6 pounders and two half-tracks armed with flamethrowers.

The assault started at 15:45 under the command of Abraham "Kiki" Elkin (who later was promoted to Lt. Colonel), and all the while the fort was subjected to artillery fire. At 15:47, the Egyptian flag on the southeastern tower was knocked down by a shell, which significantly raised the Israeli morale. Yitzhak Sadeh wrote: "The flag is a symbol. I guess our "dry" people hold symbols in high regard. When the flag fell, to them it looked like the victory was in the box." At 16:00 the Israeli forces breached the outlying fences without encountering resistance.

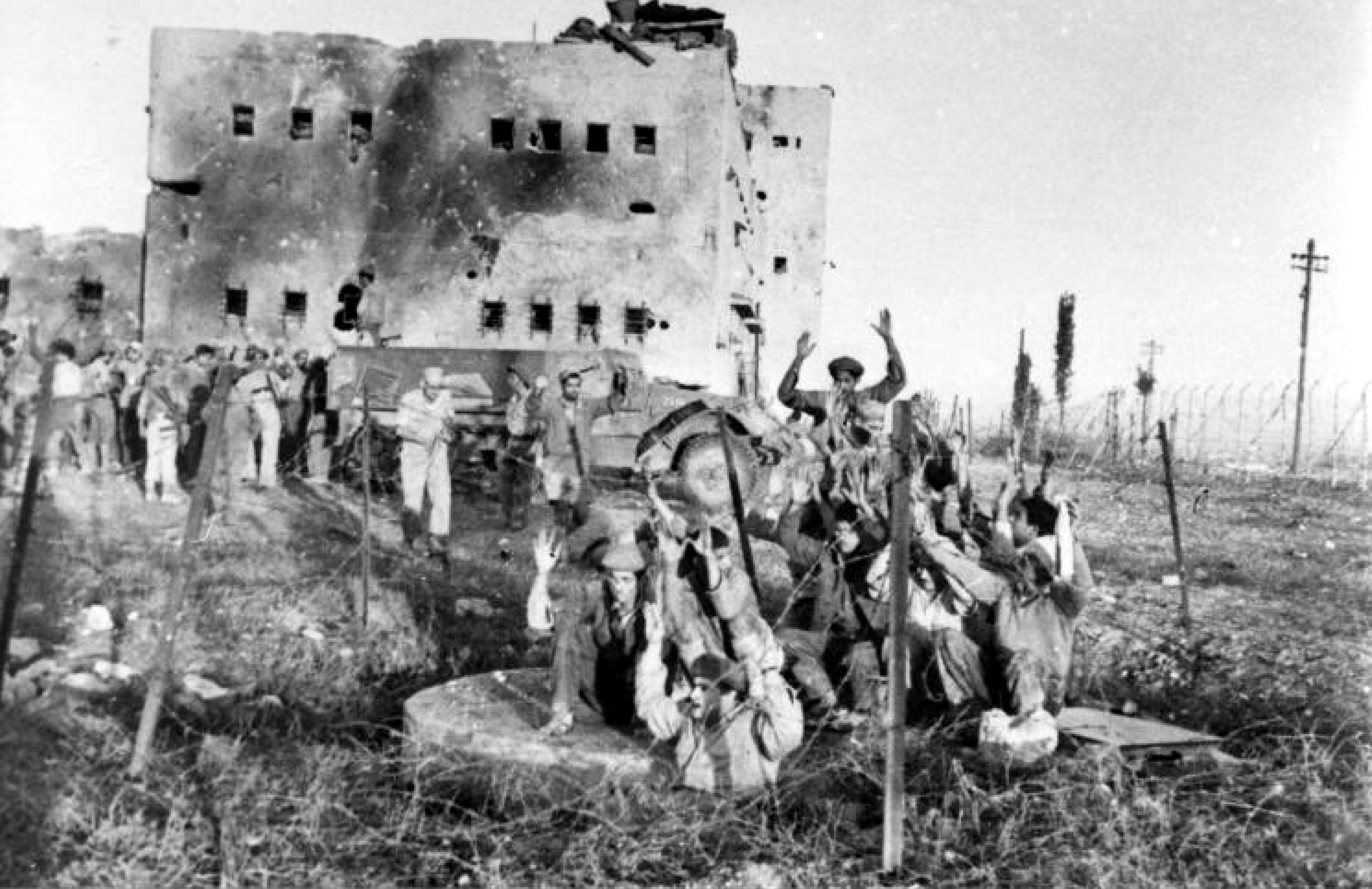
Egyptian prisoners taken at Iraq Suwaydan under bombardment

Around 15:50, the armored forces began to move toward the fort. Tanks from Battalion 82, accompanied by soldiers and a demolitions team from Battalion 89 armed with Bangalore torpedoes, broke through the barbed-wire fences and reached the compound's walls. The demolitions team from Company A of the 89th Battalion, blew a gap in the western wall of the fort. The Egyptian force manning the fort surrendered as soon as the wall was breached.

There were few Israeli casualties. Other than the prisoners of war, the Israelis captured four medium machine guns, two 3" mortars and a number of PIATs. Following the surrender of the fort, the Egyptians decided to evacuate nearby positions, including Bayt 'Affa, the village Iraq Suwaydan and the positions west of Fallujah. The Israelis immediately capitalized on this, taking hills 112.4, 112.6, 120.4 and 128.6 on 9 November, and the seven hills west of Fallujah on 10 November, which they had failed to take by force just a week earlier.

Meanwhile, Israeli mechanized forces were met with stiff resistance in the village of Iraq Suwaydan, and two armored vehicles were hit by Egyptian artillery. The driver of the first vehicle, Private Siman-Tov Gana, was severely injured but provided cover fire for the rest of the force as it retreated, and was awarded the Hero of Israel citation for his efforts. Six Israelis were killed and 14 were wounded in the battle.

== Aftermath ==
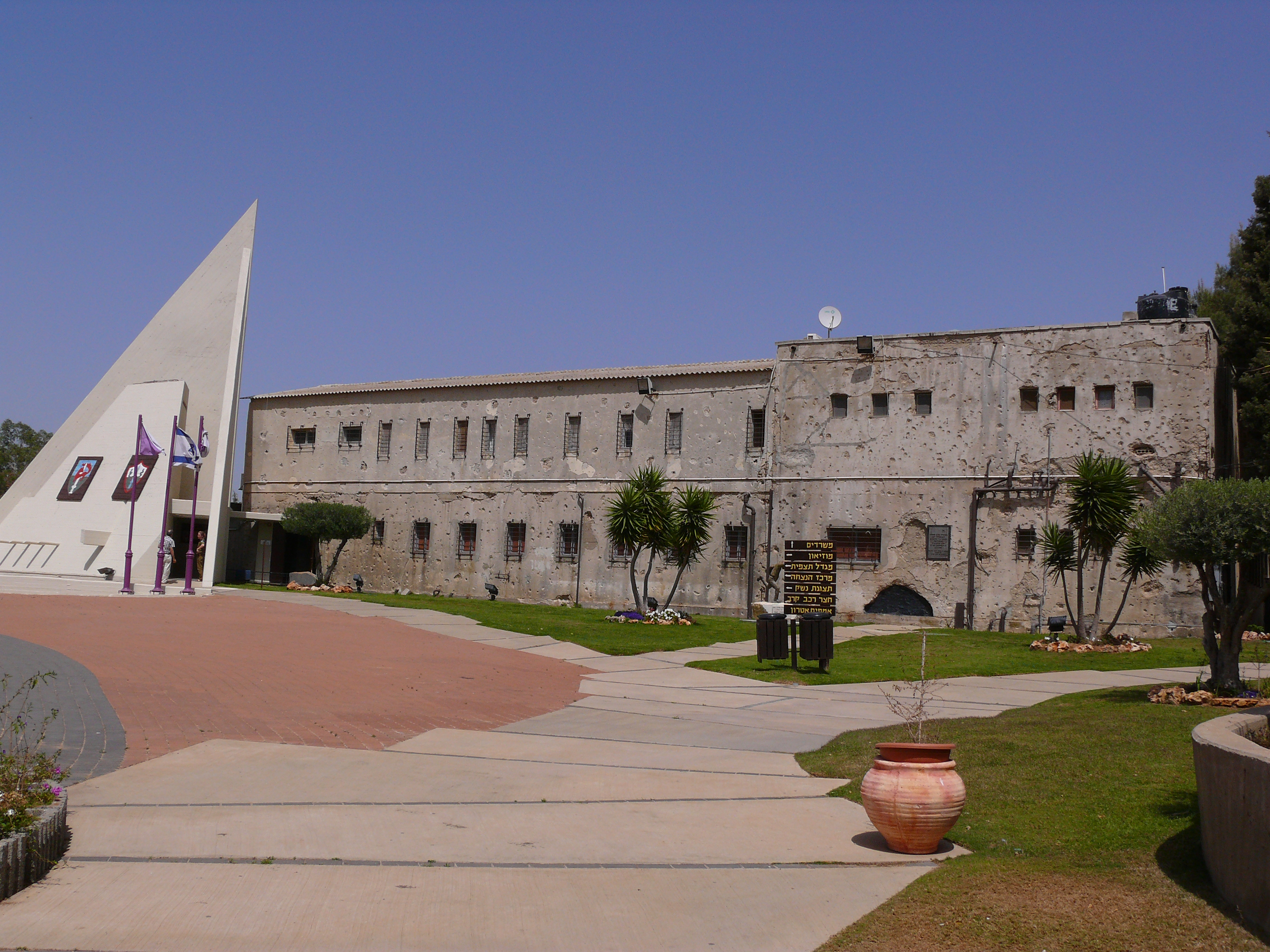
The Givati Museum in the Yoav Fortress in 2008

The capture of the Iraq Suwaydan police fort led to the withdrawal of the Egyptian army from the villages of Iraq Suweidan and Bayt 'Affa, reducing the "Falluja pocket" to the villages of Faluja and Iraq al-Manshiyyah only. The capture of the area by the 8th Brigade reduced the ongoing threat to nearby Jewish settlements, particularly Kibbutz Negba, which had suffered from artillery shelling over a long period of time.

The victorious Israeli forces returned for a victory celebration held in Negba a week later. Negba, which had been attacked twice by Egyptian forces, was presented the Egyptian flag from the fort by Yitzhak Sadeh.

The Givati Brigade culture officer, Abba Kovner, renamed the structure to Fort Yoav (Hebrew: מְצוּדַת יוֹאָב), after Yitzhak "Yoav" Dubno, who was killed in action in Negba on 21 May 1948. The fort became an Israeli military base and the Givati Museum was opened there in the 1980s.

== Bibliography ==
- Hashavia, Aryeh (1981). "Armored Corps". IDF in its Corps: Army and Security Encyclopedia (in Hebrew). Vol. 7. Revivim Publishing.
- Lorch, Netanel (1998). History of the War of Independence (in Hebrew). Modan Publishing.
- Wallach, Jehuda, ed. (1978). "Security". Carta's Atlas of Israel (in Hebrew). Vol. First Years 1948–1961. Carta Jerusalem.
- Yitzhaki, Aryeh (1988). A Guide to War Monuments and Sites in Israel (English title) (in Hebrew). Vol. 2 (south). Barr Publishers.
