= Iraq Suwaydan =

Iraq Suwaydan عراق سويدان Iraq al-Suweidan
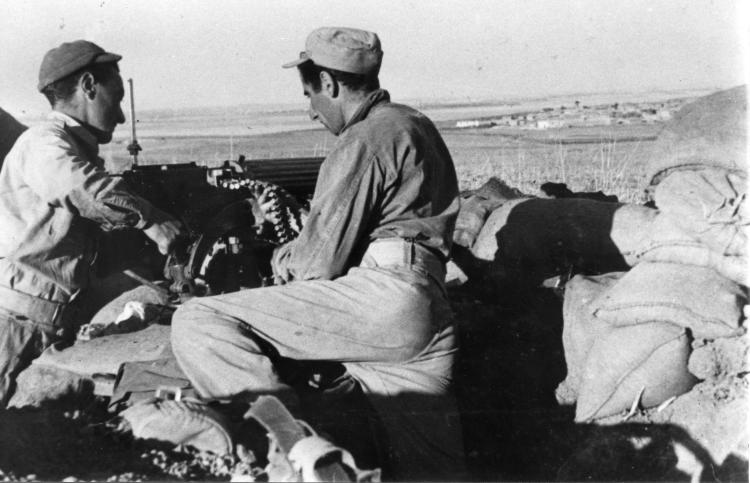
- View of Iraq Suwaydan village from Israeli machine gun position, November 1948
- Etymology: "The cavern of Suweidan"
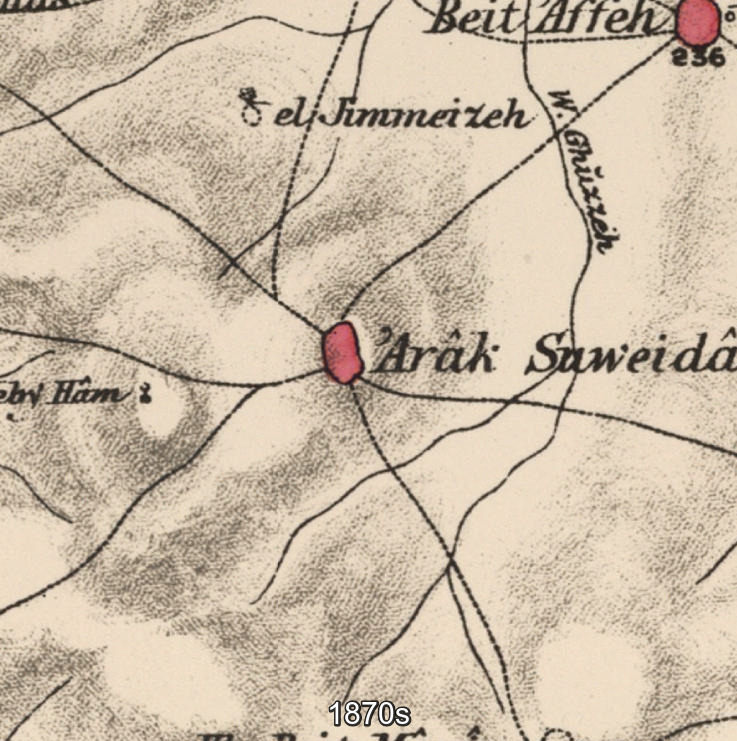
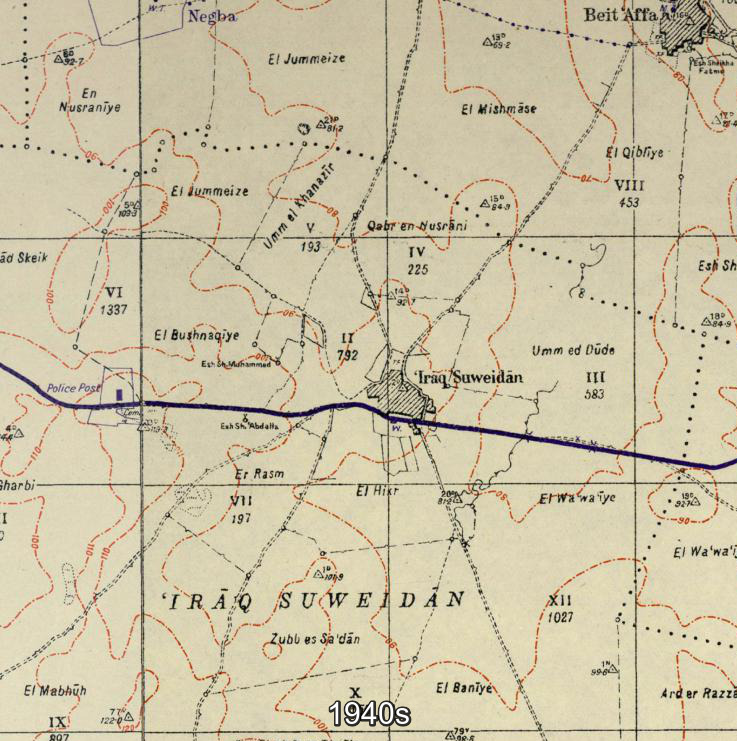
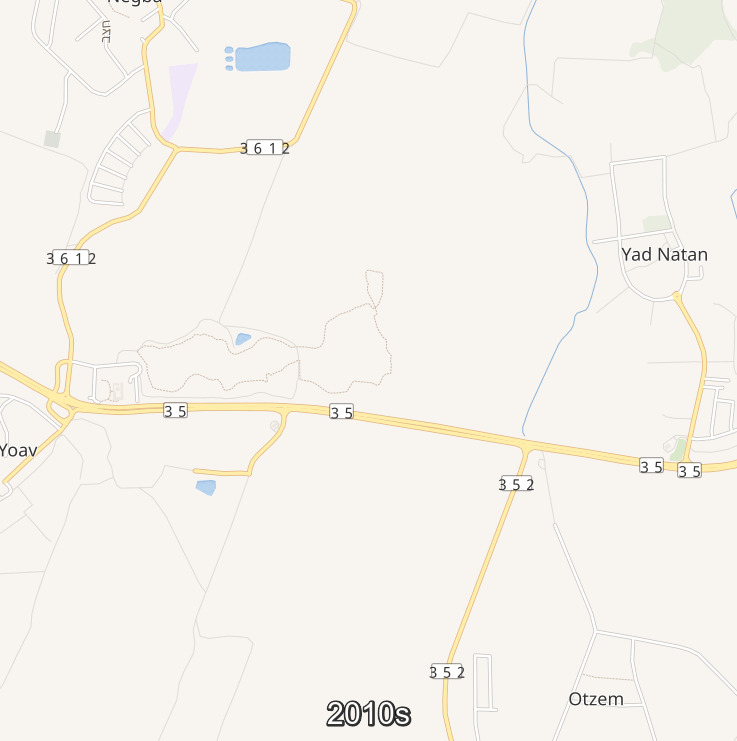
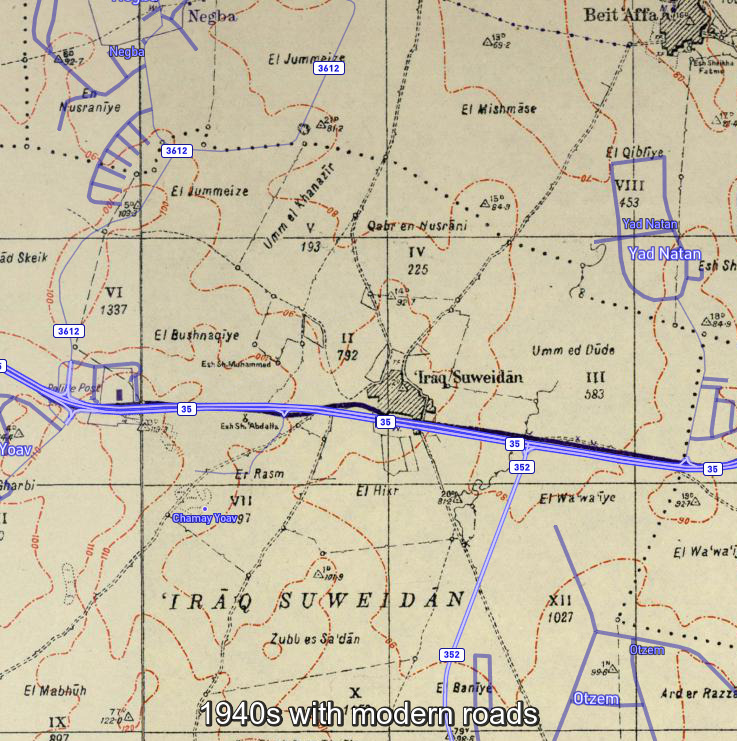
- 1870s map 1940s map modern map 1940s with modern overlay map A series of historical maps of the area around Iraq Suwaydan (click the buttons)

- Location within Mandatory Palestine
- Coordinates: 31°38′55″N 34°41′34″E
- Palestine grid: 121/117
- Geopolitical entity: Mandatory Palestine
- Subdistrict: Gaza
- Date of depopulation: 8 July 1948

Area
  - Total: 7,529 dunams (7.529 km^{2}; 2.907 sq mi)

Population (1945)
  - Total: 660
- Cause(s) of depopulation: Military assault by Yishuv forces
- Current Localities: Yad Natan, Otzem, Sde Yoav

'Iraq Suwaydan (Arabic: عراق سويدان, Hebrew: עיראק סווידאן) was a Palestinian Arab village located 27 km (17 mi) northeast of Gaza City. It was captured by Israeli forces in Operation Yoav against the defending Egyptian Army during the 1948 Arab-Israeli War. The village infrastructure, with the exception of the police station built by the British Mandate authorities, was destroyed.

== History ==
Archaeological excavations have found remains from the early Roman, Byzantine and Umayyad periods.

=== Ottoman Empire ===
Iraq Suwaydan, like all of Palestine was incorporated into the Ottoman Empire in 1517. In the 1596 tax registers, Iraq Suwaydan was listed as an entirely Muslim village called "Iraq", located in the nahiya of Gazza, part of Gaza Sanjak, with a population of 45 families and 16 bachelors. The inhabitants paid a fixed tax rate of 33.3% on agricultural products, including wheat, barley, summer crops, vineyards, fruit trees, sesame, goats and beehives, in addition to occasional revenues; a total of 5,000 akçe. 1/4 of the revenue went to a Waqf.

During the 17th and 18th centuries, the area of 'Iraq Suwaydan experienced a significant process of settlement decline due to nomadic pressures on local communities. The residents of abandoned villages moved to surviving settlements, but the land continued to be cultivated by neighboring villages.

In 1838 Edward Robinson noted it on his travels in the area, as a Muslim village in the Gaza district.

Socin found from an official Ottoman village list from about 1870 that Arak es-Sudan counted 29 houses and a population of 112, though the population count included men only. Hartmann found that the village had 94 houses.

In 1883, the PEF's Survey of Western Palestine described it as a moderate-sized village situated on a plain.

=== British Mandate ===
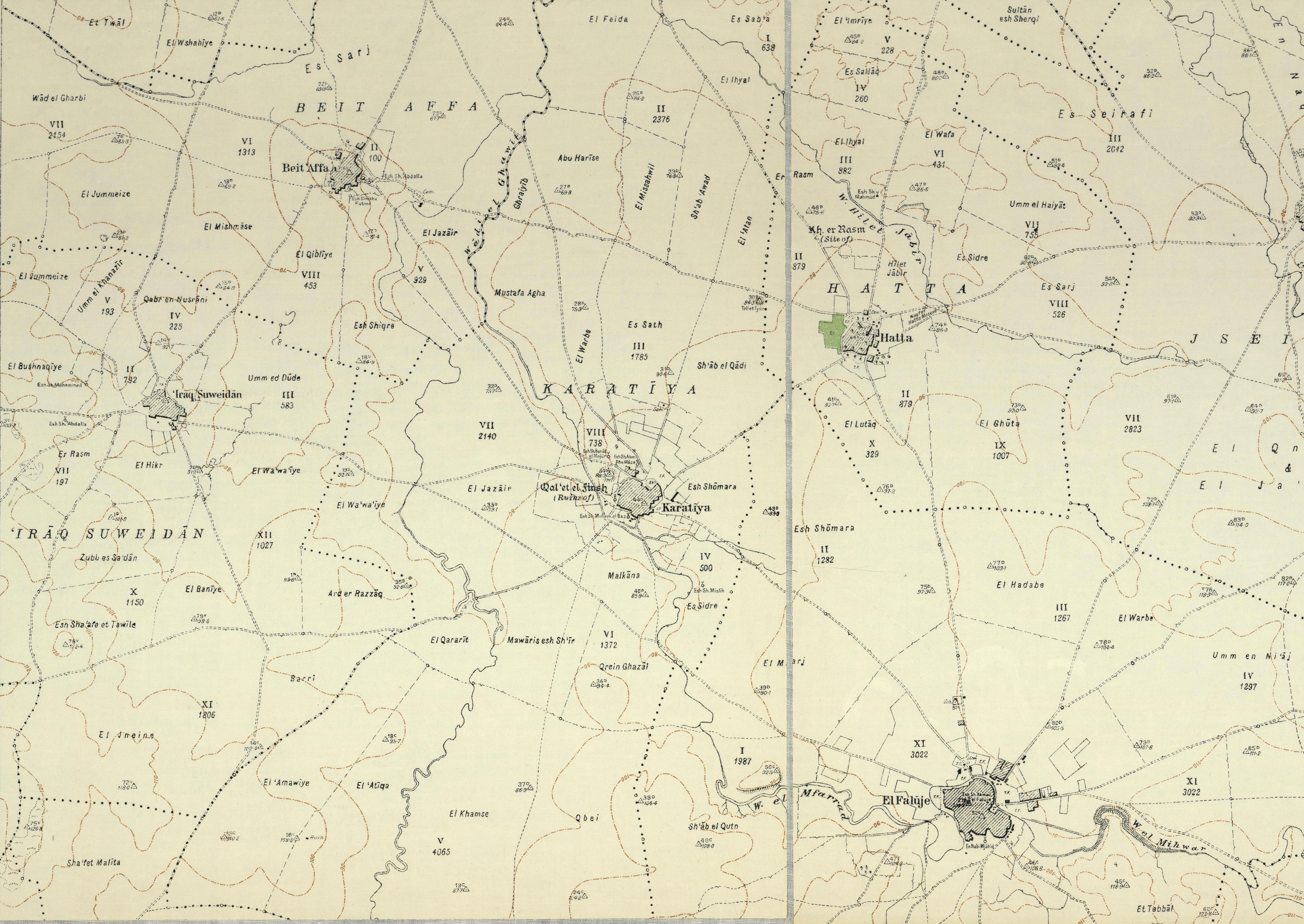
Iraq Suwaydan 1930 1:20,000

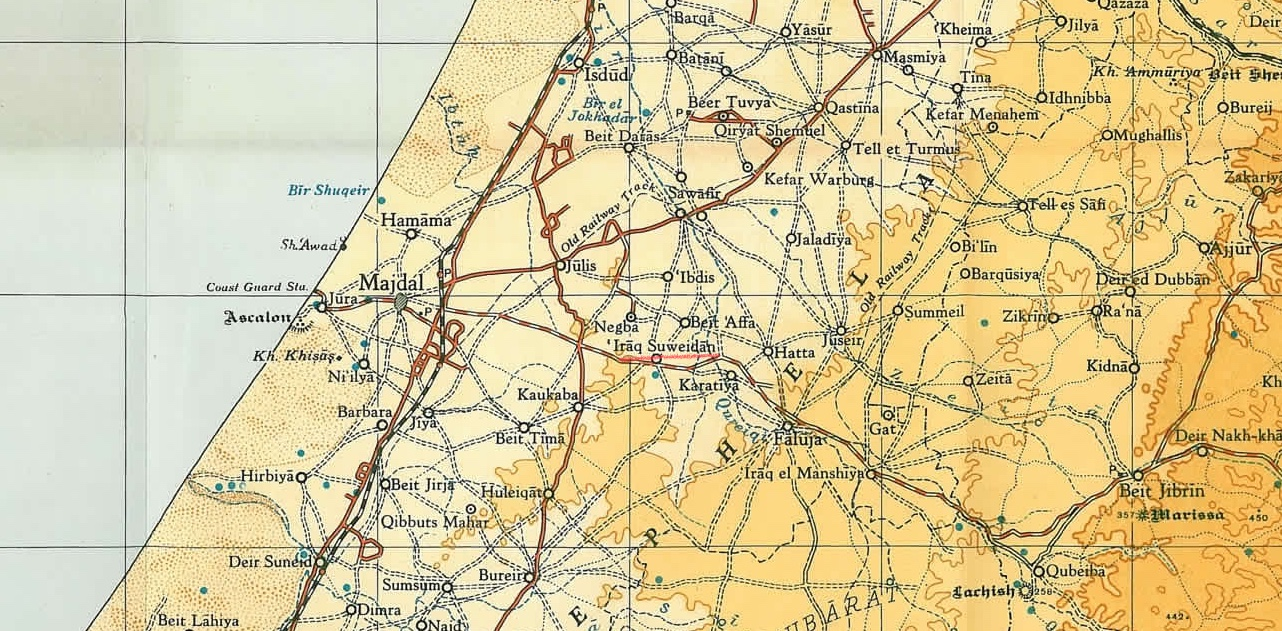
1945 map showing Iraq Suwaydan

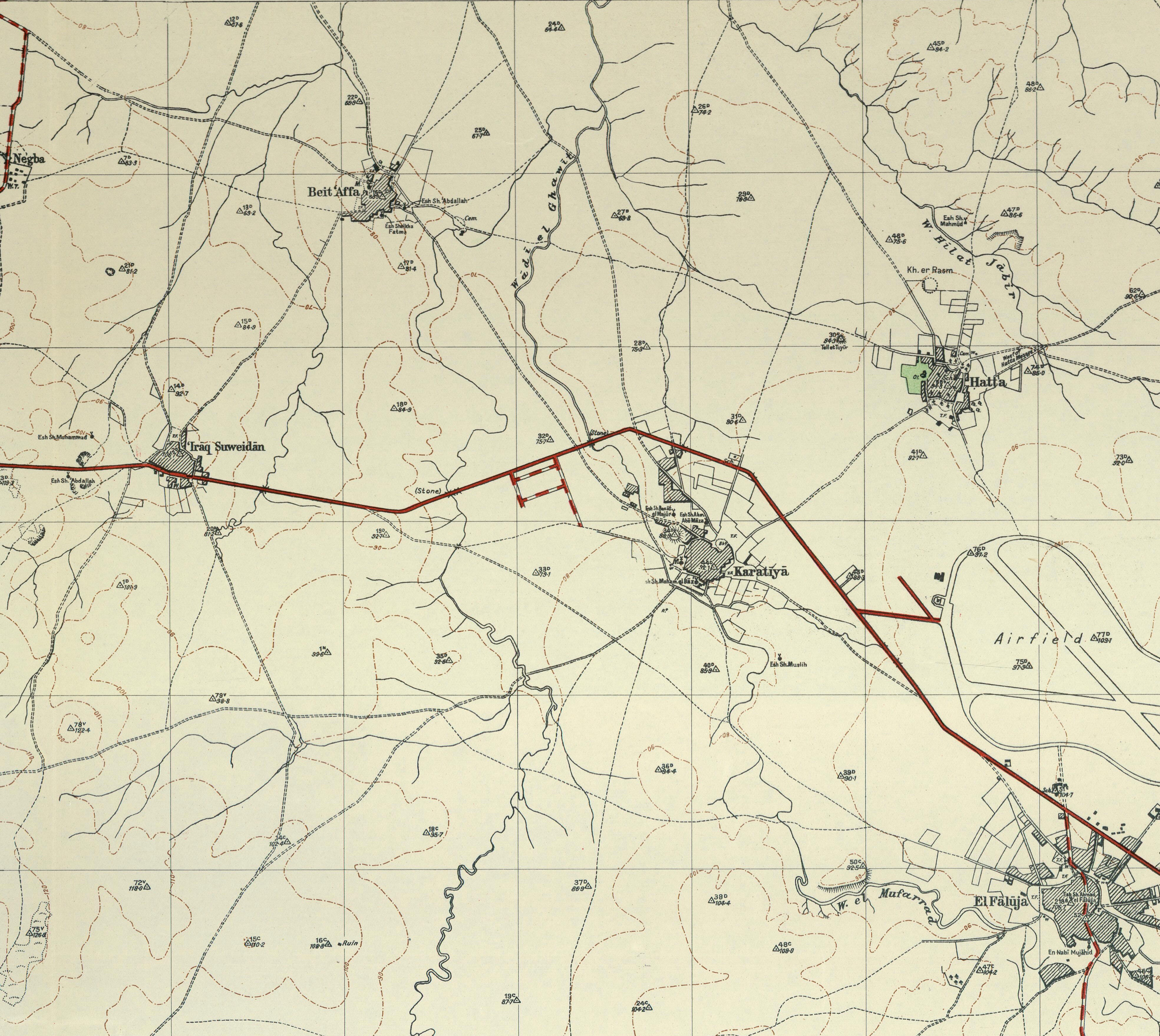
Iraq Suwaydan 1948 1:20,000

In the 1922 census of Palestine, conducted by the British Mandate authorities, 'Eraq el-Suaiden had a population of 349 Muslims, increasing in the 1931 census to 440, still all Muslims, in 81 houses.

In 1942, the villagers established an elementary school and in 1947 shared its facilities with the children of the neighboring villages, Ibdis and Bayt 'Affa. There were 104 students in the mid-1940s. The main crop was grain, with some almond trees and grapes.

In the 1945 statistics 'Iraq Suweidan had a population of 660, all Muslims, with a total of 7,529 dunams of land, according to an official land and population survey. Of this, 9 dunams were used for plantations and irrigable land, 7,329 for cereals, while 35 dunams were built-up land.

=== Israel ===
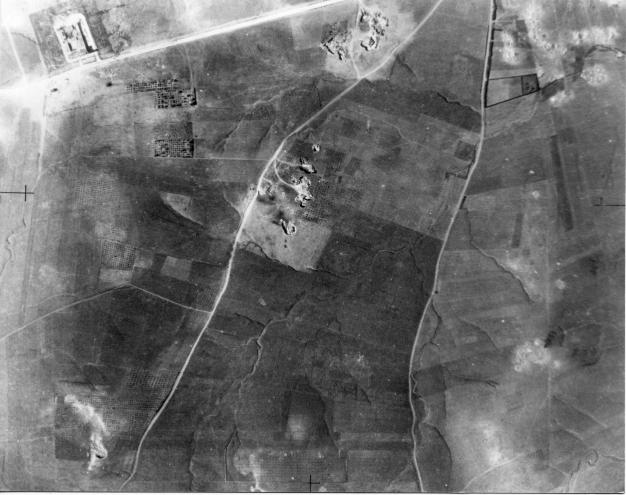
Iraq Suwaydan. 1948 aerial photograph from Palmach archives. Police Station top left. Signs of Negba battles to right.

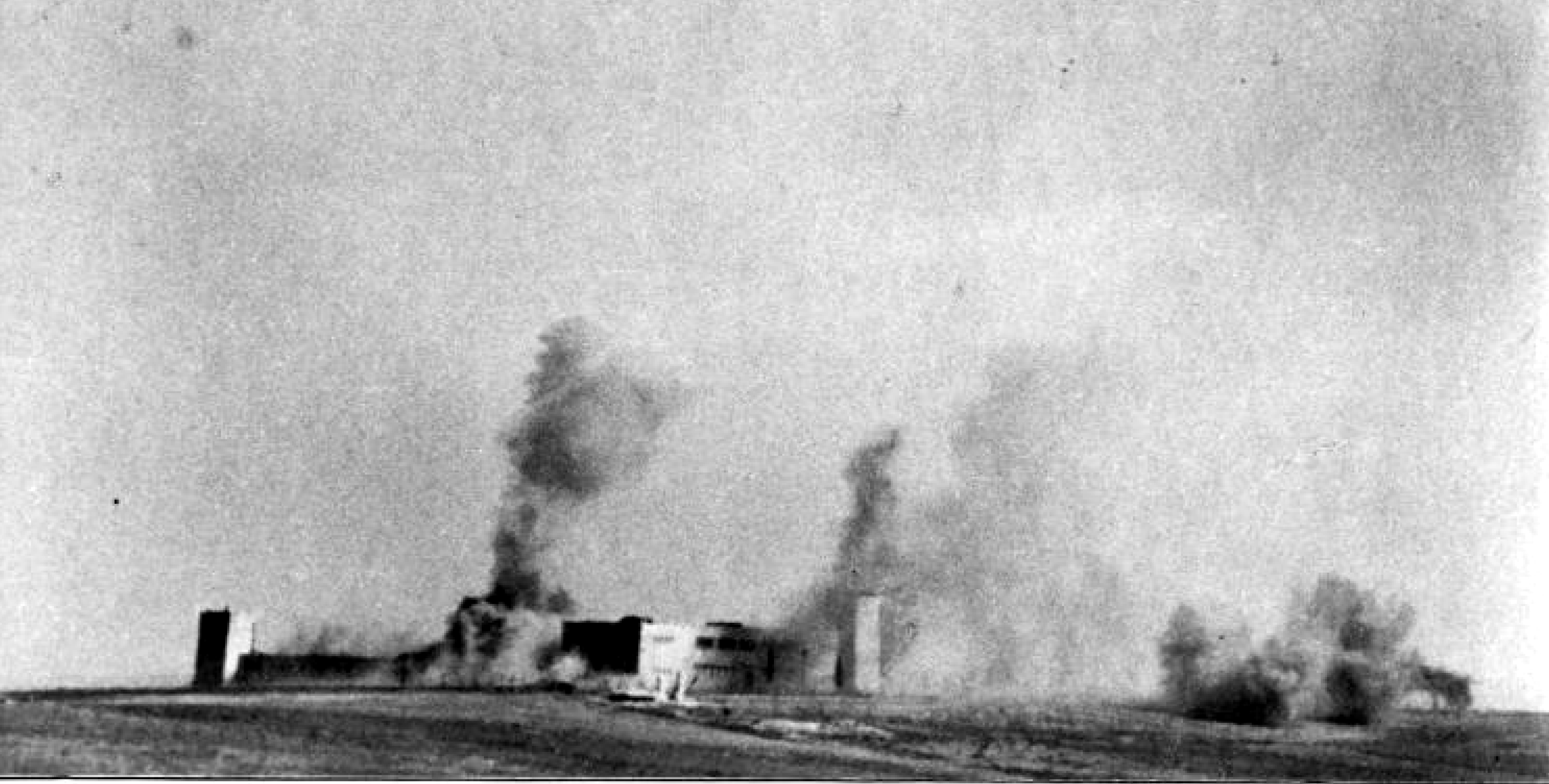
Police fort bombing, 9 November 1948

On 12 May 1948, the British authorities withdrew, handing over the police fort to the Egyptian army, which then garrisoned it. The fort controlled the road between al-Majdal and Bayt Jibrin as well as the main road to the Negev. The village was captured and destroyed during Operation Yoav. Eight Israeli attempts to capture the fort failed. It finally fell on 9 November 1948 after a massive bombardment including air strikes by B-17 Flying Fortress aircraft.

Following the war the area was incorporated into the State of Israel. In 1953 the moshav of Yad Natan was founded east of Iraq Suwaydan on village lands. In 1955 another moshav named Otzem was established on village lands to the southeast and in 1956, kibbutz Sde Yoav was established west of the site, close to village land.

In 1992, remains of houses could be seen in a eucalyptus grove that the Palestinian historian Walid Khalidi identified as the center of the village, along with cacti and remnants of a pool. Two roads, one passing through the village and the other leading to fields, were recognizable. The British police station, renamed Metzudat Yo'av, was still in use and the surrounding lands were cultivated by Israeli farmers.

== See also ==
- Operation Shmone
- Depopulated Palestinian locations in Israel

== Bibliography ==
- Barron, J.B., ed. (1923). Palestine: Report and General Abstracts of the Census of 1922. Government of Palestine.
- Benvenisti, M. (2002). Sacred Landscape: The Buried History of the Holy Land Since 1948. University of California Press. ISBN 978-0-520-23422-2. P. 42
- Conder, C.R.; Kitchener, H.H. (1883). The Survey of Western Palestine: Memoirs of the Topography, Orography, Hydrography, and Archaeology. Vol. 3. London: Committee of the Palestine Exploration Fund.
- Hadawi, S. (1970). Village Statistics of 1945: A Classification of Land and Area ownership in Palestine. Palestine Liberation Organization Research Center.
- Hartmann, M. (1883). "Die Ortschaftenliste des Liwa Jerusalem in dem türkischen Staatskalender für Syrien auf das Jahr 1288 der Flucht (1871)". Zeitschrift des Deutschen Palästina-Vereins. 6: 102–149.
- Hütteroth, W.-D.; Abdulfattah, K. (1977). Historical Geography of Palestine, Transjordan and Southern Syria in the Late 16th Century. Erlanger Geographische Arbeiten, Sonderband 5. Erlangen, Germany: Vorstand der Fränkischen Geographischen Gesellschaft. ISBN 3-920405-41-2.
- Khalidi, W. (1992). All That Remains: The Palestinian Villages Occupied and Depopulated by Israel in 1948. Washington D.C.: Institute for Palestine Studies. ISBN 0-88728-224-5.
- Mills, E., ed. (1932). Census of Palestine 1931. Population of Villages, Towns and Administrative Areas. Jerusalem: Government of Palestine.
- Morris, B. (2004). The Birth of the Palestinian Refugee Problem Revisited. Cambridge University Press. ISBN 0-521-00967-7.
- Palmer, E.H. (1881). The Survey of Western Palestine: Arabic and English Name Lists Collected During the Survey by Lieutenants Conder and Kitchener, R. E. Transliterated and Explained by E.H. Palmer. Committee of the Palestine Exploration Fund.
- Robinson, E.; Smith, E. (1841). Biblical Researches in Palestine, Mount Sinai and Arabia Petraea: A Journal of Travels in the year 1838. Vol. 2. Boston: Crocker & Brewster.
- Robinson, E.; Smith, E. (1841). Biblical Researches in Palestine, Mount Sinai and Arabia Petraea: A Journal of Travels in the year 1838. Vol. 3. Boston: Crocker & Brewster.
- Seriy, Gregory (18 December 2007). "'Iraq Suweidan Final Report" (119). Hadashot Arkheologiyot – Excavations and Surveys in Israel.
- Socin, A. (1879). "Alphabetisches Verzeichniss von Ortschaften des Paschalik Jerusalem". Zeitschrift des Deutschen Palästina-Vereins. 2: 135–163.
- Tal, D. (2004). War in Palestine, 1948: Strategy and diplomacy. London: Routledge. ISBN 978-1-1357-7513-1.
- Village Statistics, April, 1945. Government of Palestine, Department of Statistics. 1945.
