= Jusayr =

Jusayr جسير
- Etymology: "the little bridge"
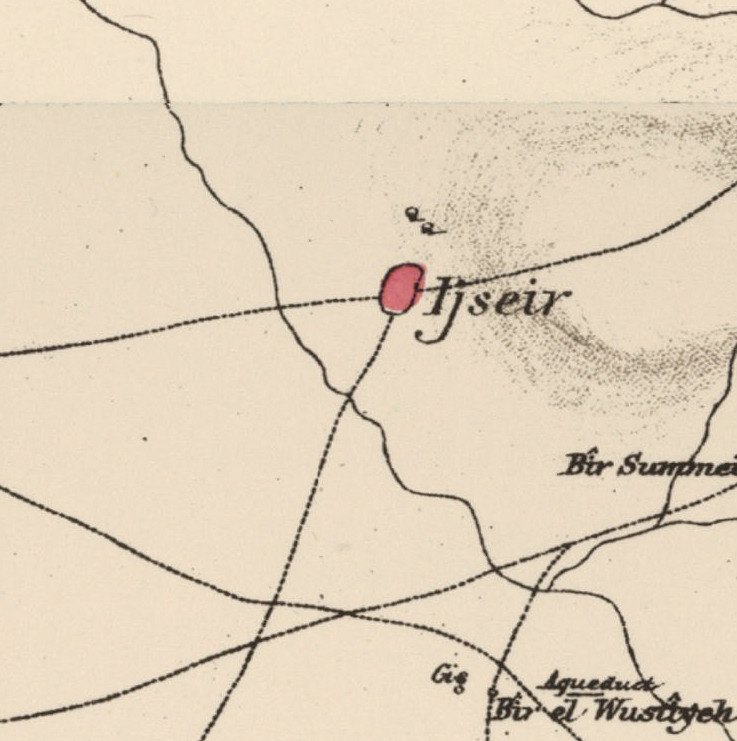
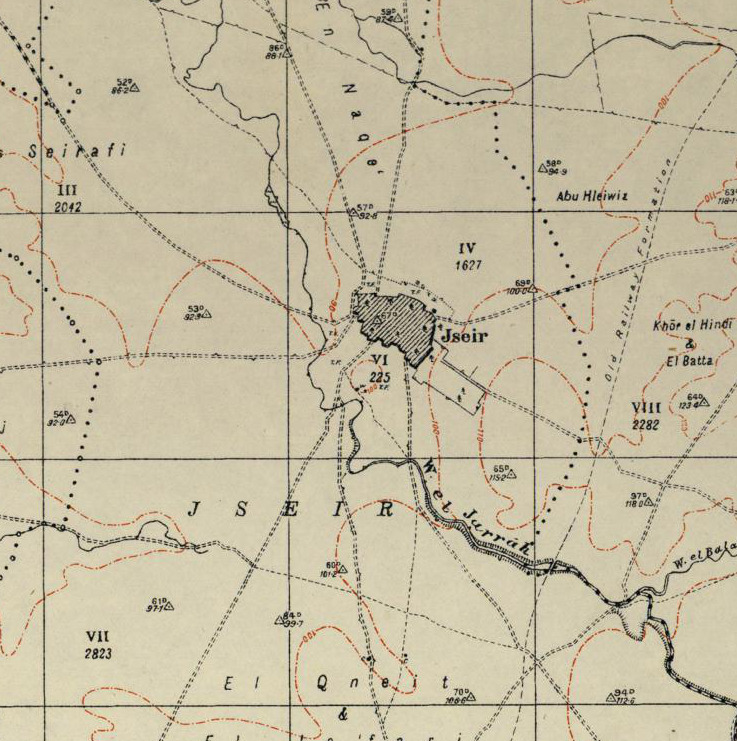
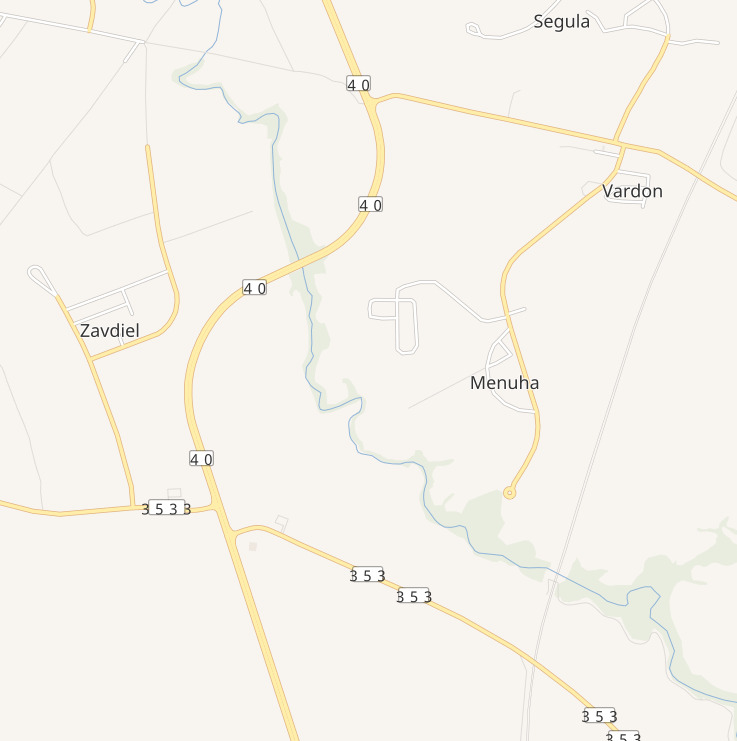
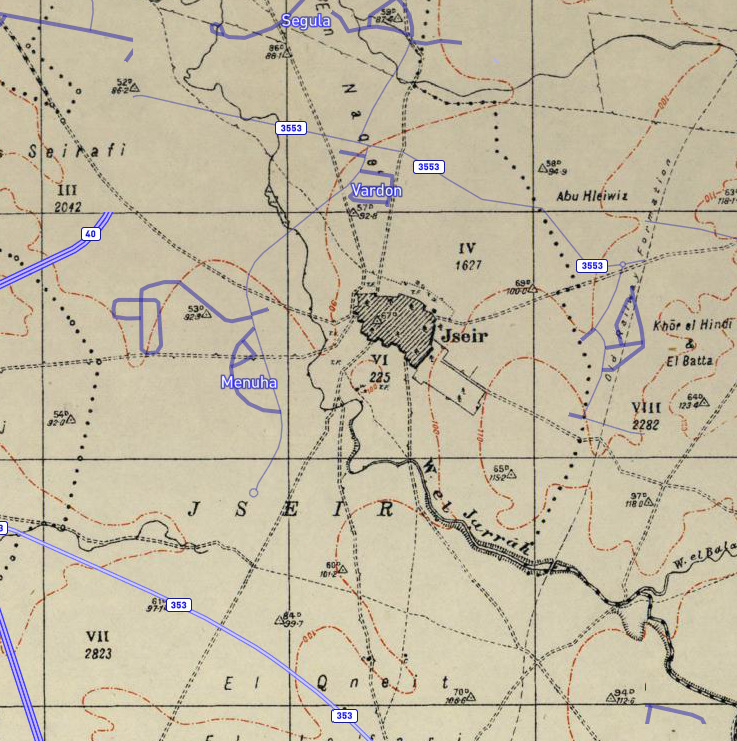
- 1870s map 1940s map modern map 1940s with modern overlay map A series of historical maps of the area around Jusayr (click the buttons)

- Location within Mandatory Palestine
- Coordinates: 31°39′25″N 34°46′15″E
- Palestine grid: 128/118
- Geopolitical entity: Mandatory Palestine
- Subdistrict: Gaza
- Date of depopulation: July 17–18, 1948

Area
  - Total: 12,361 dunams (12.361 km^{2}; 4.773 sq mi)

Population (1945)
  - Total: 1,180
- Cause(s) of depopulation: Military assault by Yishuv forces
- Current Localities: Menuha, Wardon

Jusayr was a Palestinian Arab village in the Gaza Subdistrict. It was depopulated during the 1948 Arab-Israeli War on July 17, 1948, under Operation Barak or Operation Yo'av. It was located 35 km northeast of Gaza.

== History ==
Ceramics from the Byzantine era have been found here.

Jusayr's residents came from Egypt and the Hejaz.

=== Ottoman era ===
In 1517, Jusayr was incorporated into the Ottoman Empire with the rest of Palestine, and in 1596 the village appeared in the Ottoman tax registers as being in the nahiya (subdistrict) of Gaza under the Liwa of Gaza. It had a population of 60 household; an estimated population of 330. The whole population was Muslim. It paid a fixed tax rate of 25% on a number of crops, including wheat, barley, summer crops, vineyards, fruit trees, goats, beehives, as well as on "occasional revenues"; a total of 12,180 Akçe.

In 1838, Edward Robinson noted el Juseir as a Muslim village, located in the Gaza district.

In 1863 Victor Guérin visited the village, which he found to have 500 inhabitants, while an Ottoman village list from about 1870 found that the village had a population of 296, in a total of 119 houses, though the population count included men, only.

In 1883 the PEF's Survey of Western Palestine (SWP) described it as being an adobe village on flat ground.

=== British Mandate era ===
In the 1922 census of Palestine conducted by the British Mandate authorities, Jusayr had a population of 579 inhabitants, all Muslims, increasing in the 1931 census to 839 Muslims, in a total of 246 houses.

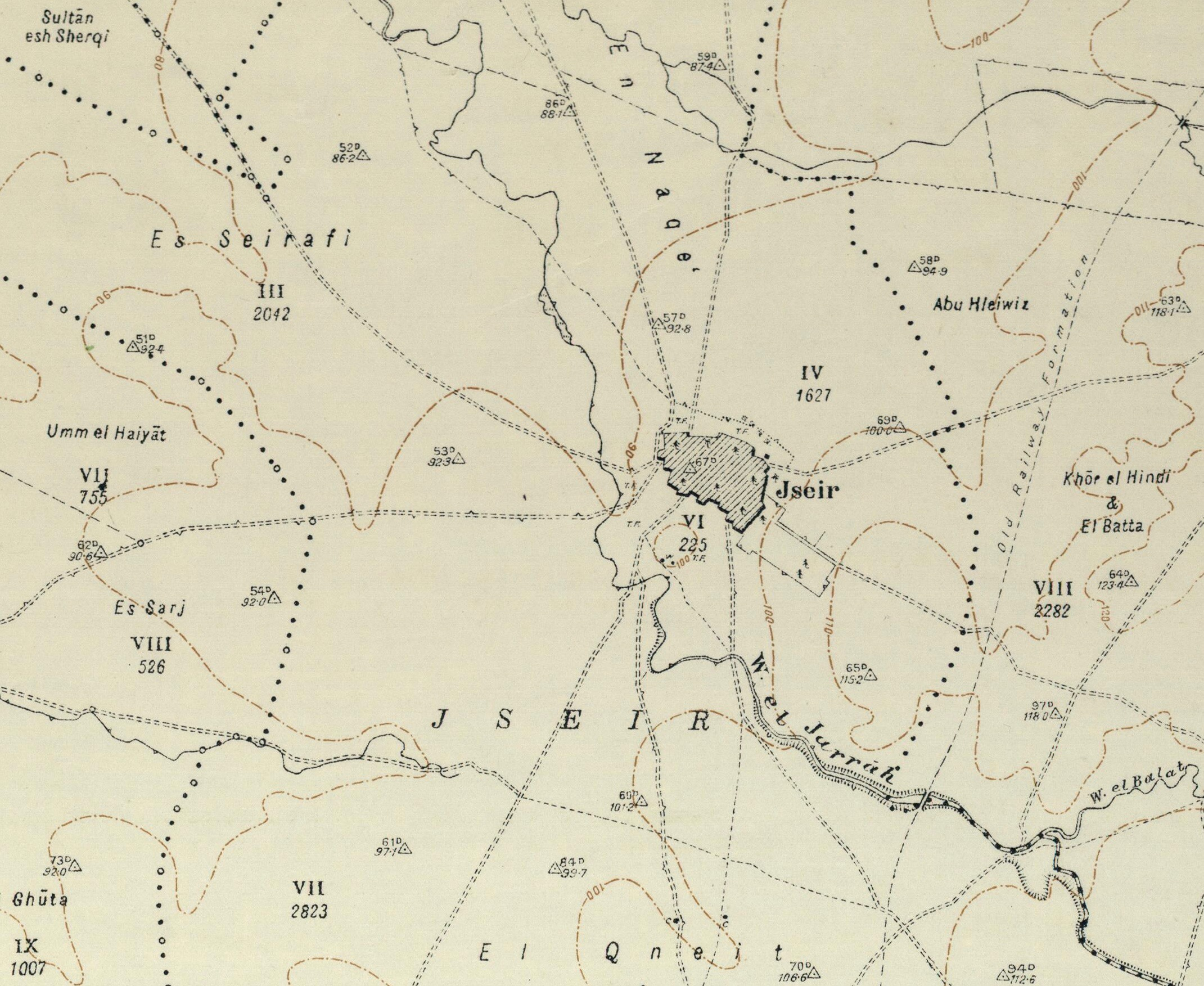
Jusayr 1931 1:20,000

By the 1945 statistics, Jusayr had a population of 1180 Muslims, with a total of 12,361 dunams of land, according to an official land and population survey. Of this, 11,852 dunams were used for cereals, while 54 dunams were built-up land.

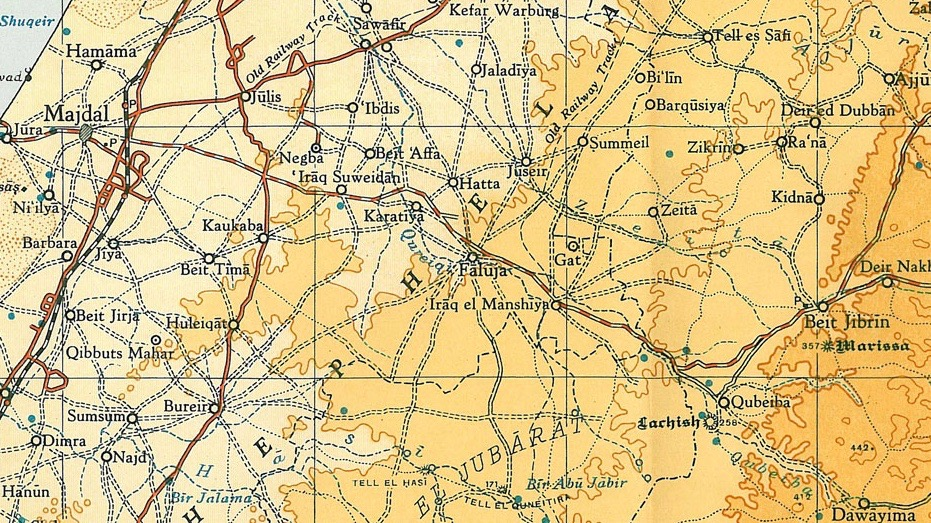
Jusayr 1945 1:250,000

Jusayr had an elementary school for boys which was founded in 1937, and by 1945, it had 74 students.

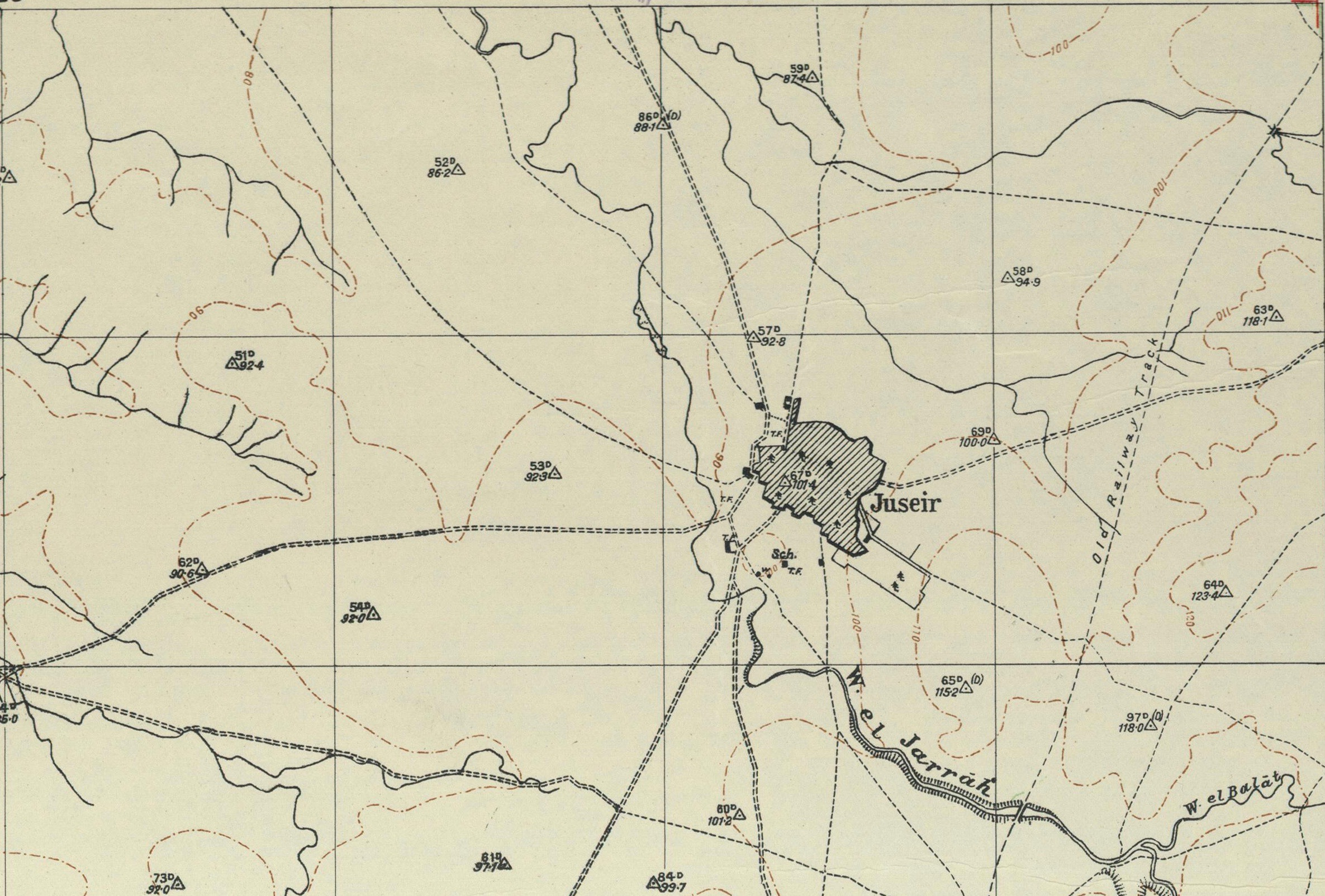
Jusayr 1948 1:20,000

=== Post 1948 ===
In 1992 the village site was described: "One concrete, flat-roofed house still stands in the middle of a peach orchard. Its front facade has two rectangular windows and a rectangular entrance in the middle. The debris of houses among tall grasses and weeds is visible. A garbage dump is now located on the site, as well as buildings that belong to an Israeli settlement. The surrounding lands are cultivated."

== Bibliography ==
- Barron, J. B., ed. (1923). Palestine: Report and General Abstracts of the Census of 1922. Government of Palestine.
- Conder, C.R.; Kitchener, H.H. (1883). The Survey of Western Palestine: Memoirs of the Topography, Orography, Hydrography, and Archaeology. Vol. 3. London: Committee of the Palestine Exploration Fund.
- Dauphin, C. (1998). La Palestine byzantine, Peuplement et Populations. BAR International Series 726 (in French). Vol. III : Catalogue. Oxford: Archeopress. ISBN 0-860549-05-4.
- Department of Statistics (1945). Village Statistics, April, 1945. Government of Palestine.
- Guérin, V. (1869). Description Géographique Historique et Archéologique de la Palestine (in French). Vol. 1: Judee, pt. 2. Paris: L'Imprimerie Nationale.
- Hadawi, S. (1970). Village Statistics of 1945: A Classification of Land and Area ownership in Palestine. Palestine Liberation Organization Research Center.
- Hartmann, M. (1883). "Die Ortschaftenliste des Liwa Jerusalem in dem türkischen Staatskalender für Syrien auf das Jahr 1288 der Flucht (1871)". Zeitschrift des Deutschen Palästina-Vereins. 6: 102–149.
- Hütteroth, W.-D.; Abdulfattah, K. (1977). Historical Geography of Palestine, Transjordan and Southern Syria in the Late 16th Century. Erlanger Geographische Arbeiten, Sonderband 5. Erlangen, Germany: Vorstand der Fränkischen Geographischen Gesellschaft. ISBN 3-920405-41-2.
- Khalidi, W. (1992). All That Remains: The Palestinian Villages Occupied and Depopulated by Israel in 1948. Washington D.C.: Institute for Palestine Studies. ISBN 0-88728-224-5.
- Mills, E., ed. (1932). Census of Palestine 1931. Population of Villages, Towns and Administrative Areas. Jerusalem: Government of Palestine.
- Morris, B. (2004). The Birth of the Palestinian Refugee Problem Revisited. Cambridge University Press. ISBN 978-0-521-00967-6. (pp. 258-9, 414)
- Nasser, G.A (1955/1973): "Memoirs" in Journal of Palestine Studies
  - "Memoirs of the First Palestine War”" no. 2 (Win. 73): 3-32], pdf-file, downloadable
- Palmer, E.H. (1881). The Survey of Western Palestine: Arabic and English Name Lists Collected During the Survey by Lieutenants Conder and Kitchener, R. E. Transliterated and Explained by E.H. Palmer. Committee of the Palestine Exploration Fund.
- Robinson, E.; Smith, E. (1841). Biblical Researches in Palestine, Mount Sinai and Arabia Petraea: A Journal of Travels in the year 1838. Vol. 2. Boston: Crocker & Brewster.
- Robinson, E.; Smith, E. (1841). Biblical Researches in Palestine, Mount Sinai and Arabia Petraea: A Journal of Travels in the year 1838. Vol. 3. Boston: Crocker & Brewster.
- Socin, A. (1879). "Alphabetisches Verzeichniss von Ortschaften des Paschalik Jerusalem". Zeitschrift des Deutschen Palästina-Vereins. 2: 135–163.
