= Yad Natan =

Moshav in southern Israel

Yad Natan: יַד נָתָן (Hebrew); ياد ناتان (Arabic)
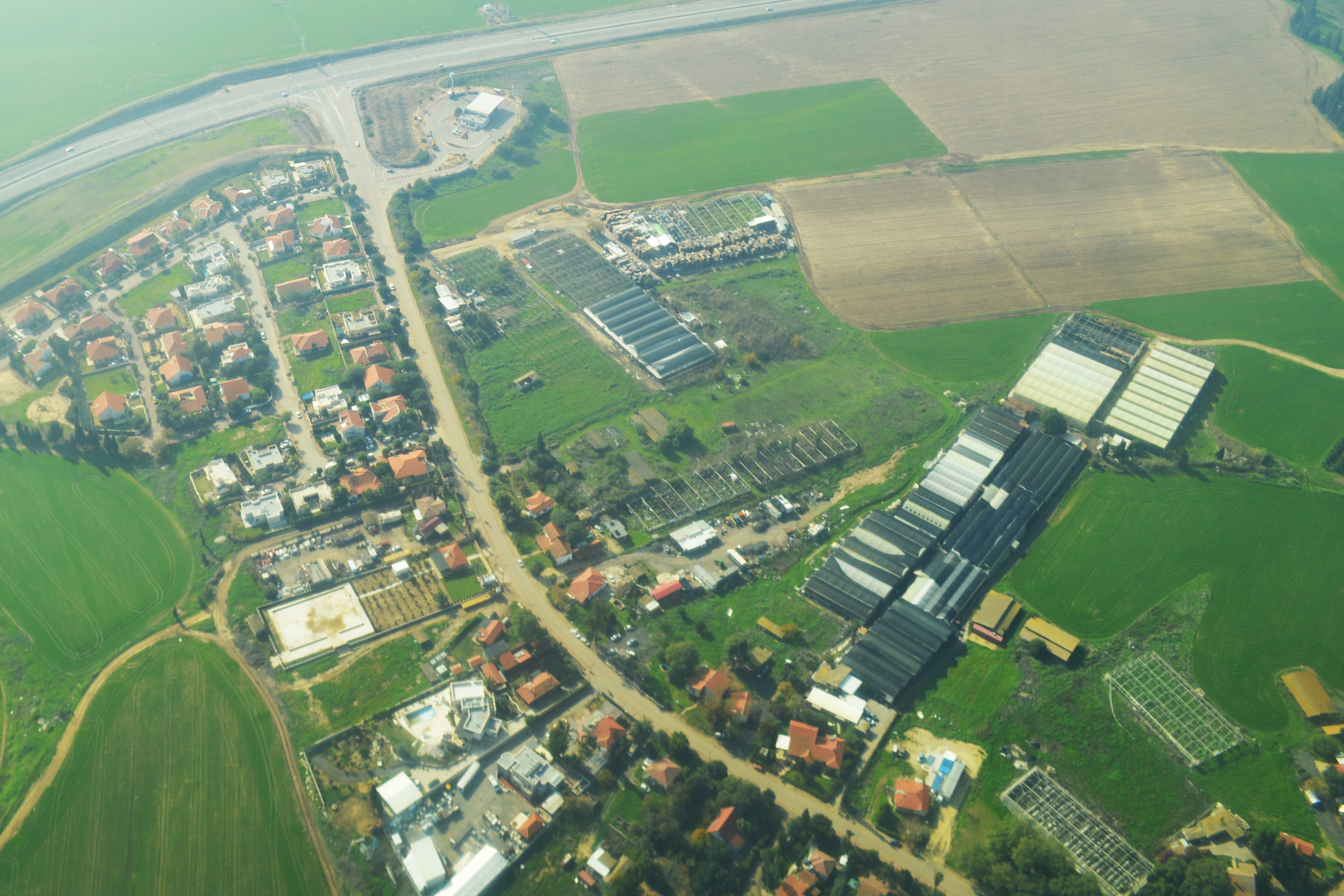
- Etymology: Natan Memorial
- Location within Ashkelon region of Israel
- Coordinates: 31°39′13″N 34°42′21″E
- Country: Israel
- District: Southern
- Subdistrict: Ashkelon
- Council: Lakhish
- Affiliation: HaOved HaTzioni
- Founded: 1953
- Founder: HaNoar HaTzioni
- Population (2024): 677

Yad Natan (Hebrew: יַד נָתָן, lit. Memorial for Natan) is a moshav in southern Israel in Hevel Lakhish, near the town of Kiryat Gat. It is part of the Lakhish Regional Council. In 2024 it had a population of 677.

== History ==
Moshav Yad Natan was founded in 1953 by Jewish immigrants from the Hungarian youth movement HaNoar HaTzioni who survived the Holocaust. It was named after Ottó Komoly (Natan Kohn), a leader of the Zionist movement in Hungary.

Yad Natan was the first moshav affiliated with the Lachish Regional Council. In 1973, the moshav was joined by 24 families from South America. Most of the residents make a living from agriculture. Roses for export, orchards, vegetable farming and poultry-breeding are the primary economic branches.

The moshav was built 800 m (2,600 ft) south and 1 km (0.62 mi) north-east, respectively, of the sites of the former Palestinian villages of Bayt 'Affa and Iraq Suwaydan, which were depopulated in the 1948 Arab-Israeli War.
