= Gaza Sanjak =

Province of the Ottoman Empire

Sanjak of Gaza سنجاق غزّه
- Sanjak of the Ottoman Empire
- 1516–1872
- Coat of arms

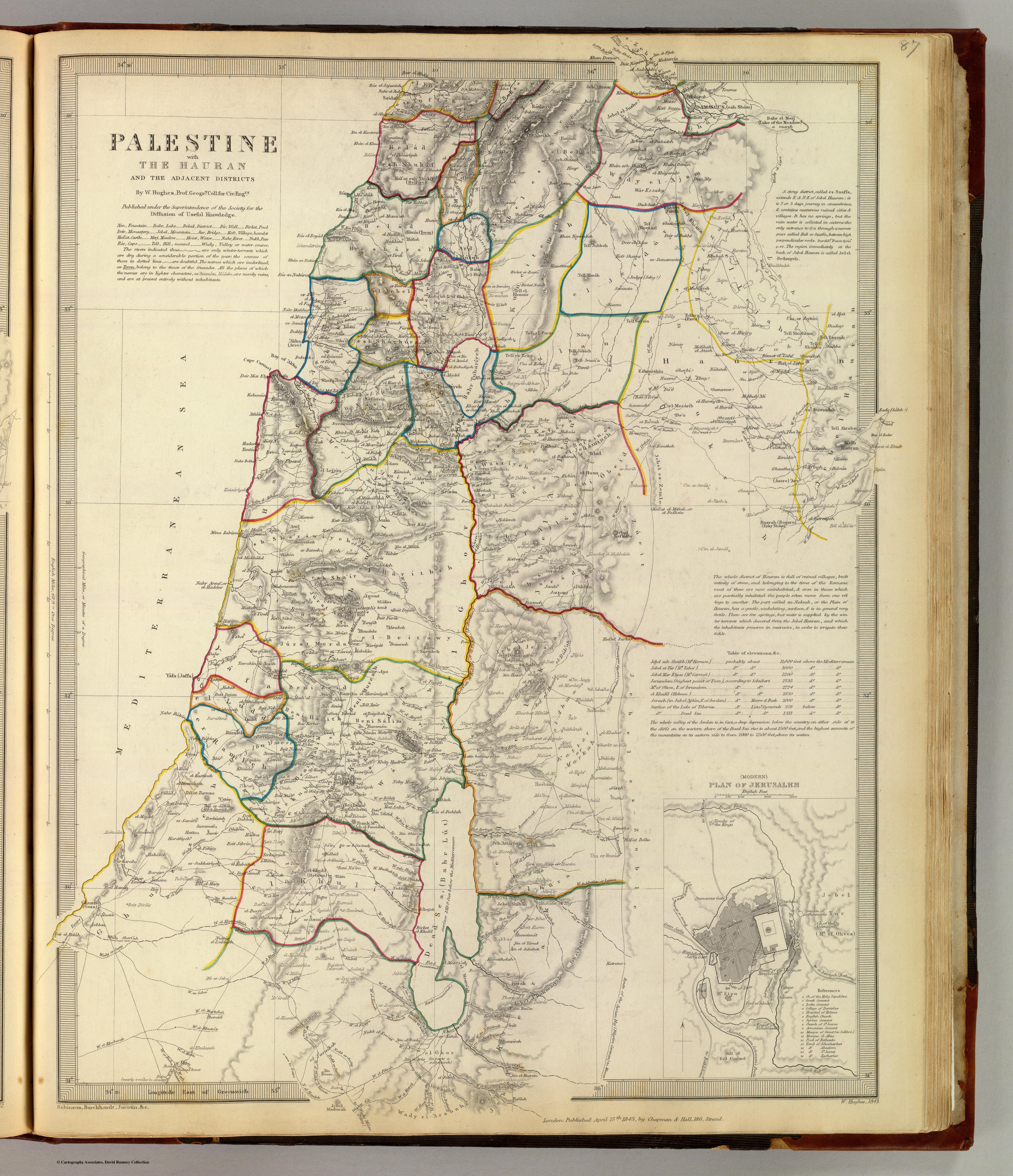
- Capital: Gaza
- Area
  - Coordinates: 31°30′N 34°25′E
- Historical era: Ottoman Palestine
  - Battle of Yaunis Khan: 1516
  - Siege of Jaffa: 1799
  - The Tanzimat reforms: 1872
- Contained within
  - Eyalet: Damascus
Succeeded by
Mutasarrifate of Jerusalem
- Today part of: Gaza Strip; Israel

Gaza Sanjak (Ottoman Turkish: سنجاق غزّه; Arabic: سنجق غزة), known in Arabic as Bilād Ghazza (the Land of Gaza), was a district of the Damascus Eyalet of the Ottoman Empire centered in Gaza City, which spread northwards up to the Yarkon River. In the 16th century it was divided into nawahi (singular: nahiya; third-level subdivisions): Gaza in the south and Ramla in the north along the Nahr Rūbīn/Wādī al-Ṣarār.

Situated in the southern part of the Levantine coastal plain, Gaza Sanjak received less precipitation and was more prone to drought and nomadic incursion than more northerly regions. Gaza Sanjak nonetleless "formed a passageway connecting Egypt and the Levant, precipitating bi-directional trade, conquest and population movements".

Marom and Taxel have shown that during the 17th-18th centuries, pressures from nomads led to settlement abandonment in the southern coastal plain. The population of abandoned villages moved to surviving settlements, while the lands of abandoned sites continued to be cultivated by neighboring villages. Overall, during the 17th century, about half of all inhabited sites in the District of Gaza were abandoned.

By 1800 settlement in the district expanded again as migrations from Egypt, improved transportation and security conditions, and settlement reorganization following land reform led to the repopulation of deserted villages with the encouragement of the Ottoman authorities.

The Ottoman census of 1871 (1288 AH) documented the Gaza District as consisting of 55 settlements, including villages and towns. These were organized into the sub-districts of al-Majdal, Gaza, and Khan Yunis. The rural population throughout this district was uniformly Sunni Muslim, adhering to the Shafi'i school of Islamic jurisprudence.

== List of settlements (1596) ==
In the 1596 daftar, the sanjak contained the following nahiyah and villages/town

=== Gaza Nahiyah ===
- Al-Sawafir al-Sharqiyya, Bayt Tima, Hamama, Al-Tina, Yibna, Isdud, Arab Suqrir, Deir al-Balah, Burayr, Jabalia, Beit Lahia, Al-Majdal, Askalan, Bayt 'Affa, Najd, Ni'ilya, Bayt Jirja, Hiribya, Qatra, Iraq Suwaydan, Kawkaba, Beit Jimal Monastery, Al-Batani al-Sharqi, Al-Qubayba, Al-Faluja, Bayt Daras, Al-Maghar, Hatta, Jusayr, Zikrin, Zayta, Barqa, Beit Hanoun, Dayr Sunayd, Simsim, Al-Jaladiyya, 'Ajjur, Al-Sawafir al-Gharbiyya, Julis, Karatiyya, Bayt Jibrin, Iraq al-Manshiyya, Qastina, Ibdis, Idnibba, Jilya, Rafah, Al-Jura, Tell es-Safi, Abasan al-Kabera, Al-Sawafir al-Shamaliyya, Summil, Barbara, Al-Muharraqa, Mughallis, Yasur

=== Ramla Nahiyah ===
- Qula, Dayr Tarif, Jaffa, Jimzu, Kharruba, Barfiliya, Sarafand al-Amar, Artuf, Bayt Susin, Islin, Al-Khayriyya, Khulda, Al-Tira, Dayr Ayyub, Qibya, Bayt Nabala, Budrus, Bnei Brak, Imwas, Aqir, Deir Qaddis, Yalo, al-Midya, Shuqba, Salama, Sar'a, Saqiya, Lod, Jisr Jindas, Bayt Dajan, Al-Safiriyya, Al-'Abbasiyya, Yazur, Innaba, Rantiya, Bir Ma'in, Bayt Shanna, Ni'lin, Kharbatha Bani Harith, Kasla, Aboud, Beit Sira, Kafr 'Ana

== Bibliography ==
- Hütteroth, W.-D.; Abdulfattah, K. (1977). Historical Geography of Palestine, Transjordan and Southern Syria in the Late 16th Century. Erlanger Geographische Arbeiten, Sonderband 5. Erlangen, Germany: Vorstand der Fränkischen Geographischen Gesellschaft. ISBN 3-920405-41-2.
