= Bayt 'Affa =

Bayt 'Affa بيت عفا
- Former village
- Etymology: The house of Affeh (or chaste)
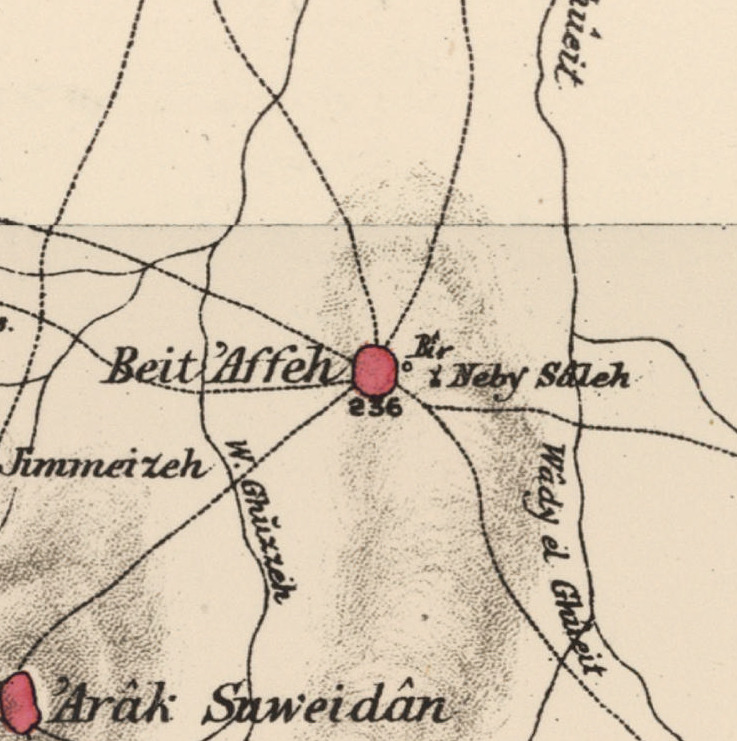
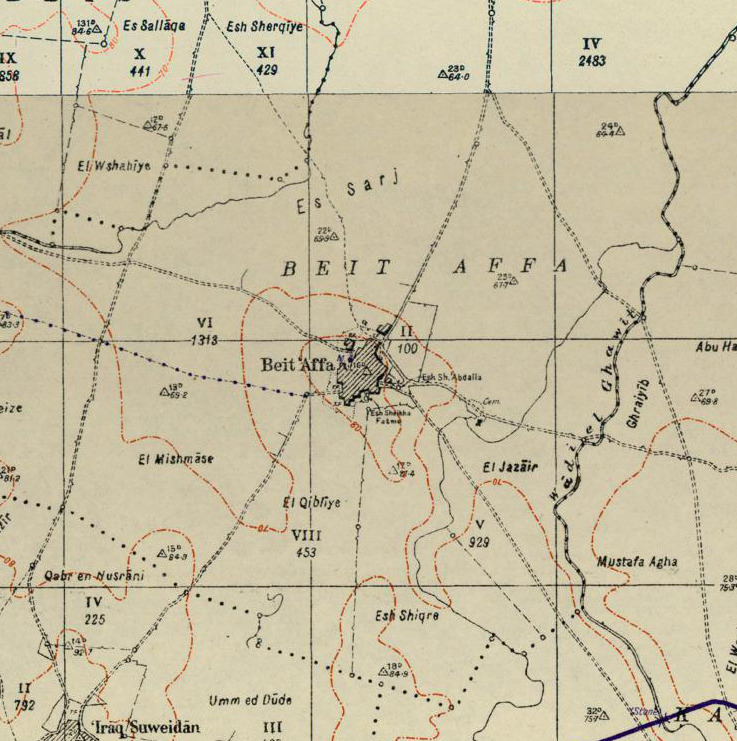
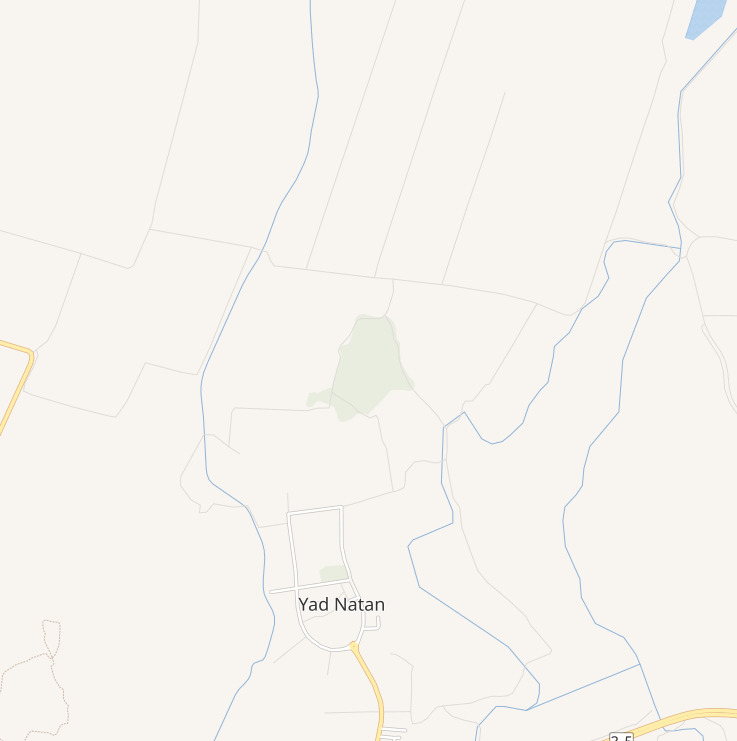
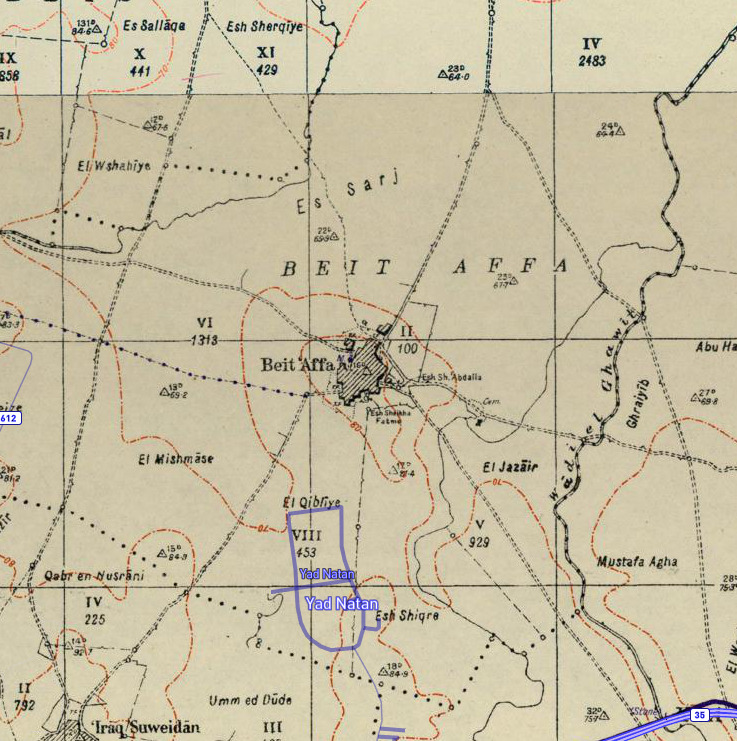
- 1870s map 1940s map modern map 1940s with modern overlay map A series of historical maps of the area around Bayt 'Affa (click the buttons)

- Location within Mandatory Palestine
- Coordinates: 31°39′41″N 34°42′24″E
- Palestine grid: 122/118
- Geopolitical entity: Mandatory Palestine
- Subdistrict: Gaza
- Date of depopulation: Not known

Area
  - Total: 5,808 dunams (5.808 km^{2}; 2.242 sq mi)

Population (1945)
  - Total: 700

Bayt 'Affa was a Palestinian village in the Gaza Subdistrict. It was depopulated and destroyed during the 1947–48 Civil War in Mandatory Palestine. It was located 29 km (18 mi) northeast of Gaza and Wadi al-Rana ran east of the village.

== History ==
The village had a khirba which contained the remains of walls made of ancient columns, uncut stones and a well.

In 1472–1473 CE, Sultan Qaitbay endowed Bayt 'Affa for the benefit of his Jerusalem madrasa.

=== Ottoman era ===
Incorporated into the Ottoman Empire in 1517 with all of Palestine, Bayt 'Affa appeared in the 1596 tax registers as being in the Nahiya of Gaza, part of Gaza Sanjak. It had a population of 26 Muslim households, an estimated 143 inhabitants, who paid taxes on wheat, barley, vine yards and fruit trees. 1/24 th of the revenue went to a waqf.

In 1838 Edward Robinson noted it as Beit 'Affa, a Muslim village in the Gaza district.

In 1863, Victor Guérin found it to be a village of 400 inhabitants, surrounded by tobacco and cucumber fields, while an Ottoman village list of about 1870 indicated 37 houses and a population of 90, though the population count included men, only.

In 1883, the PEF's Survey of Western Palestine described Bayt 'Affa as resembling Iraq Suwaydan, that is a moderate-sized adobe village situated on a plain. In addition, Bayt 'Affa was supplied with a well.

=== British Mandate era ===
According to the 1922 census of Palestine conducted by the British Mandate authorities, Bayt 'Affa had a population of 422 Muslims, which had increased in the 1931 census to 462, still all Muslim.

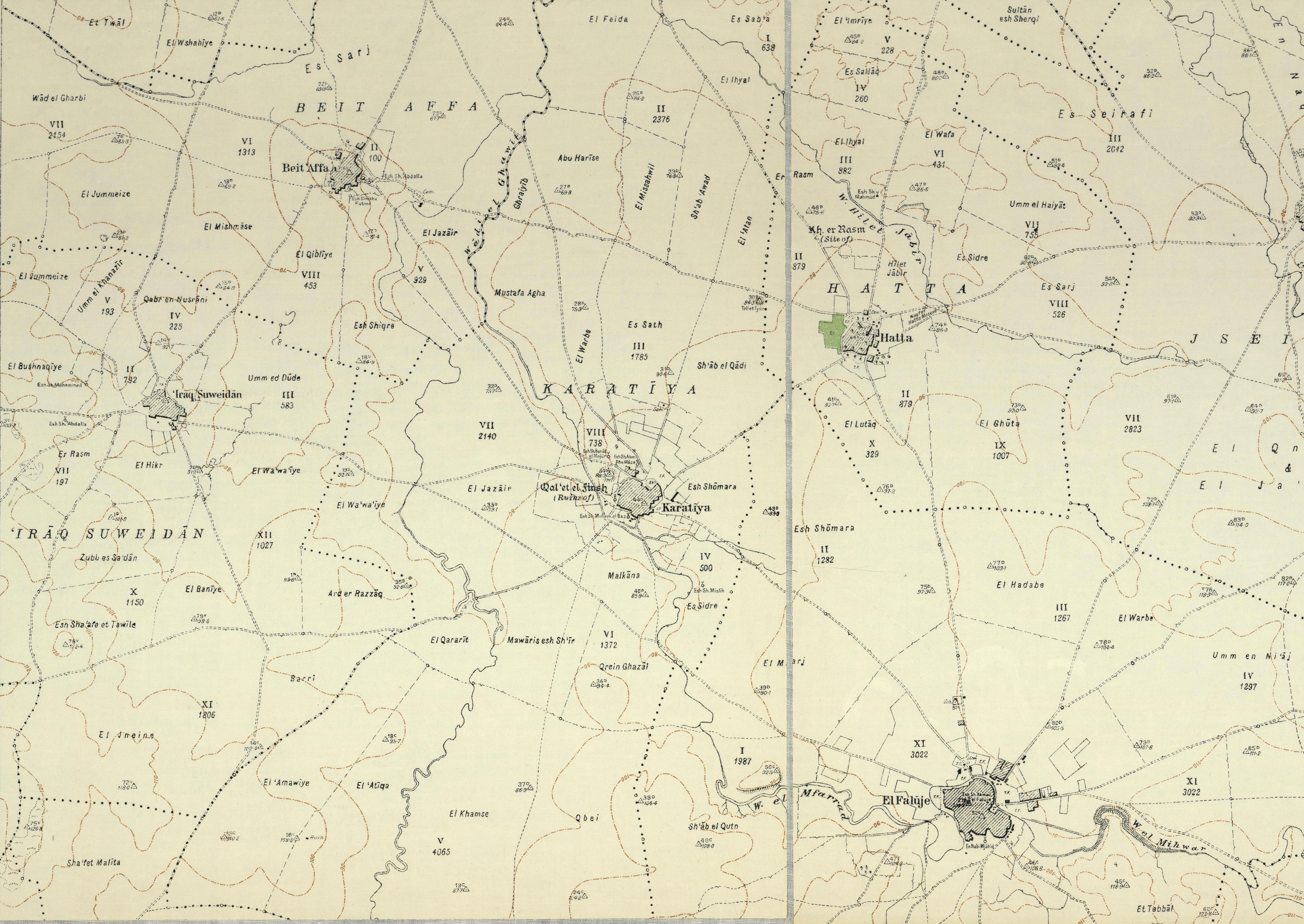
Bayt 'Affa 1930 1:20,000

In the 1945 statistics, there were 700 Muslims, with 5,808 dunams of land, according to an official land and population survey. Of this, 14 dunams were used for plantations and irrigable land, 5,657 used for cereals, while 26 dunams were built-up land.

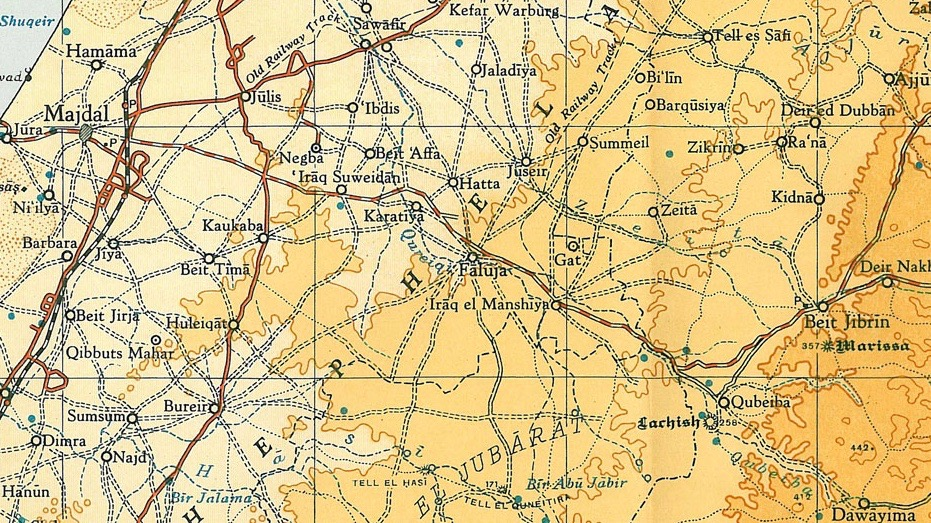
Bayt 'Affa 1945 1:250,000

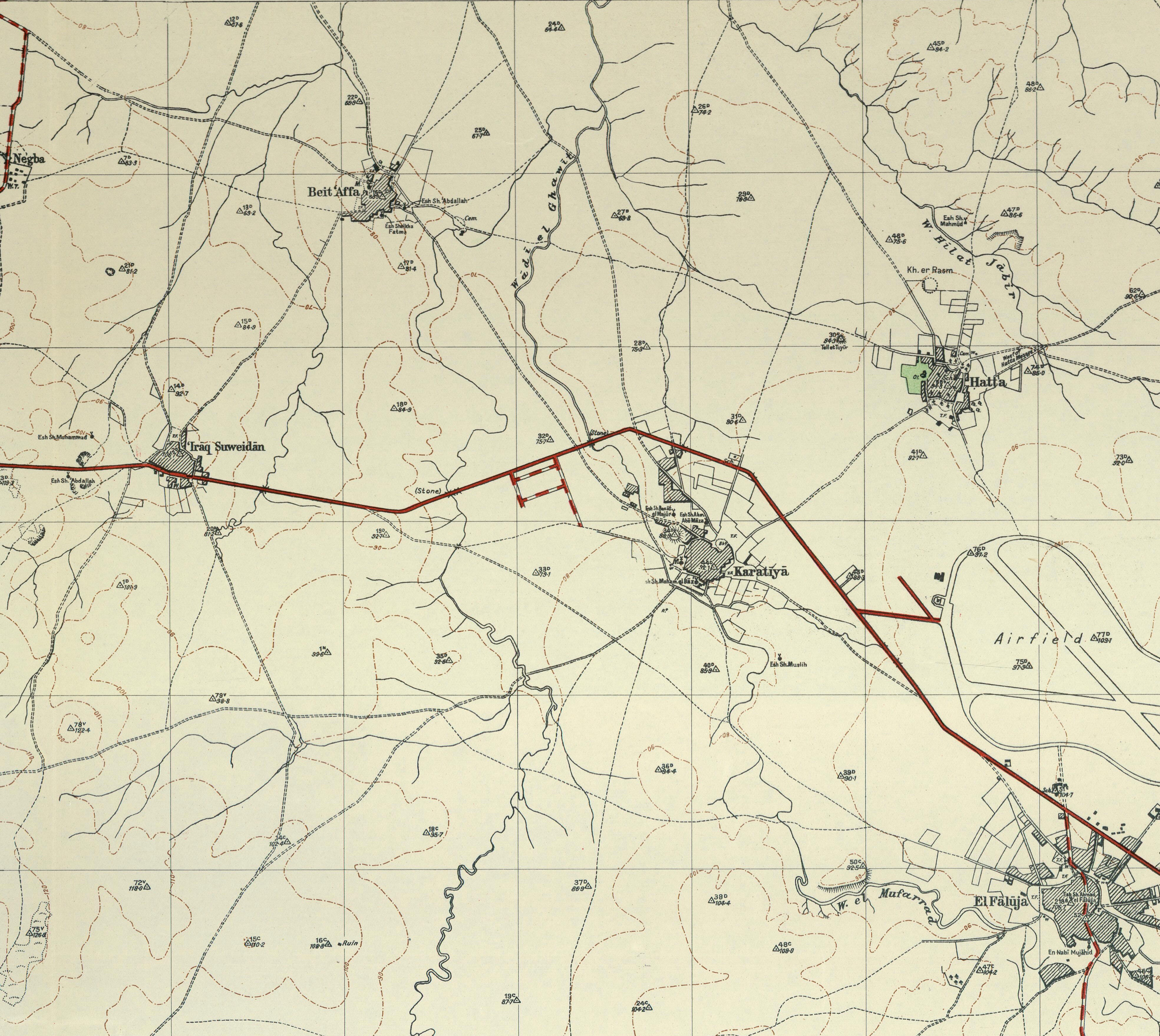
Bayt 'Affa 1930 1:20,000

=== 1948 and aftermath ===
The population probably left their homes following the capture of the village by the Israeli army around 9 July 1948. The Egyptian army drove the Israelis out a few days later and the village was not re-taken until Operation Yoav in the second half of October. The village was destroyed. Following the war the area was incorporated into the State of Israel.

In 1953 Yad Natan was established just south of the village site, on the land of Iraq Suwaydan.

In 1992 the village site was described: "There are no traces of village houses; only sycamore and carob trees and cactuses mark the site. Fruit trees, especially citrus, are planted on the surrounding land and are irrigated from the Jordan River diversion canal."

== Bibliography ==
- Barron, J.B., ed. (1923). Palestine: Report and General Abstracts of the Census of 1922. Government of Palestine.
- Conder, C.R.; Kitchener, H.H. (1883). The Survey of Western Palestine: Memoirs of the Topography, Orography, Hydrography, and Archaeology. Vol. 3. London: Committee of the Palestine Exploration Fund.
- Department of Statistics (1945). Village Statistics, April, 1945. Government of Palestine.
- Guérin, V. (1869). Description Géographique Historique et Archéologique de la Palestine (in French). Vol. 1: Judee, pt. 2. Paris: L'Imprimerie Nationale.
- Hadawi, S. (1970). Village Statistics of 1945: A Classification of Land and Area ownership in Palestine. Palestine Liberation Organization Research Center.
- Hartmann, M. (1883). "Die Ortschaftenliste des Liwa Jerusalem in dem türkischen Staatskalender für Syrien auf das Jahr 1288 der Flucht (1871)". Zeitschrift des Deutschen Palästina-Vereins. 6: 102–149.
- Hütteroth, W.-D.; Abdulfattah, K. (1977). Historical Geography of Palestine, Transjordan and Southern Syria in the Late 16th Century. Erlanger Geographische Arbeiten, Sonderband 5. Erlangen, Germany: Vorstand der Fränkischen Geographischen Gesellschaft. ISBN 3-920405-41-2.
- Khalidi, W. (1992). All That Remains: The Palestinian Villages Occupied and Depopulated by Israel in 1948. Washington D.C.: Institute for Palestine Studies. ISBN 0-88728-224-5.
- Mills, E., ed. (1932). Census of Palestine 1931. Population of Villages, Towns and Administrative Areas. Jerusalem: Government of Palestine.
- Morris, B. (2004). The Birth of the Palestinian Refugee Problem Revisited. Cambridge University Press. ISBN 978-0-521-00967-6. (pp. 256, 436, 437, 446, 456)
- Palmer, E.H. (1881). The Survey of Western Palestine: Arabic and English Name Lists Collected During the Survey by Lieutenants Conder and Kitchener, R. E. Transliterated and Explained by E.H. Palmer. Committee of the Palestine Exploration Fund.
- Robinson, E.; Smith, E. (1841). Biblical Researches in Palestine, Mount Sinai and Arabia Petraea: A Journal of Travels in the year 1838. Vol. 2. Boston: Crocker & Brewster.
- Robinson, E.; Smith, E. (1841). Biblical Researches in Palestine, Mount Sinai and Arabia Petraea: A Journal of Travels in the year 1838. Vol. 3. Boston: Crocker & Brewster.
- Socin, A. (1879). "Alphabetisches Verzeichniss von Ortschaften des Paschalik Jerusalem". Zeitschrift des Deutschen Palästina-Vereins. 2: 135–163.
