= Ibdis =

Ibdis عبدس 'Ibdis
- Etymology: personal name
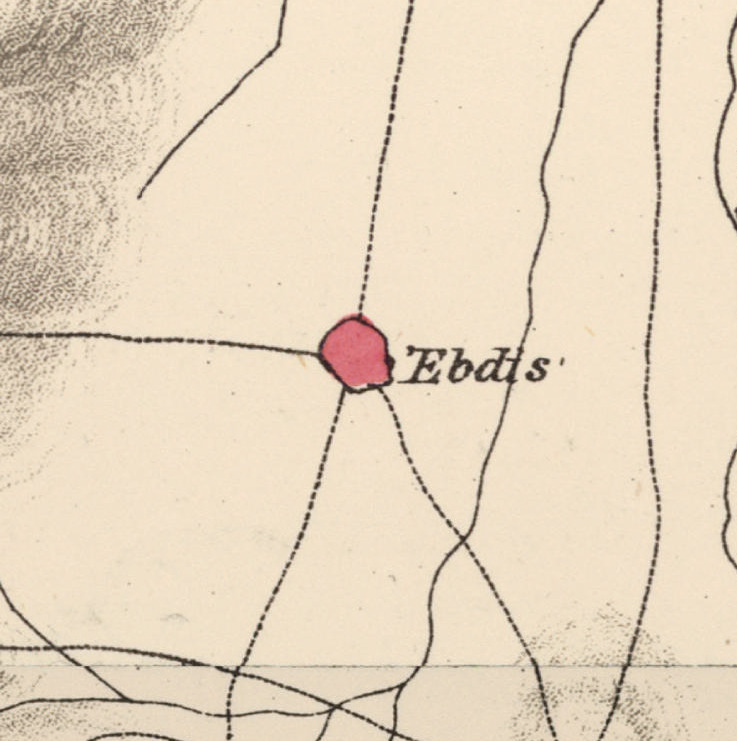
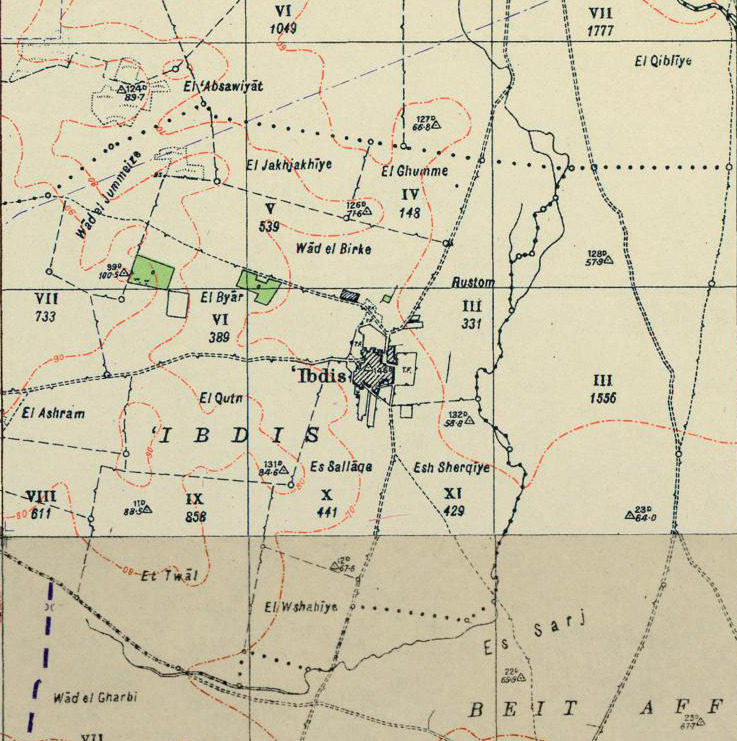
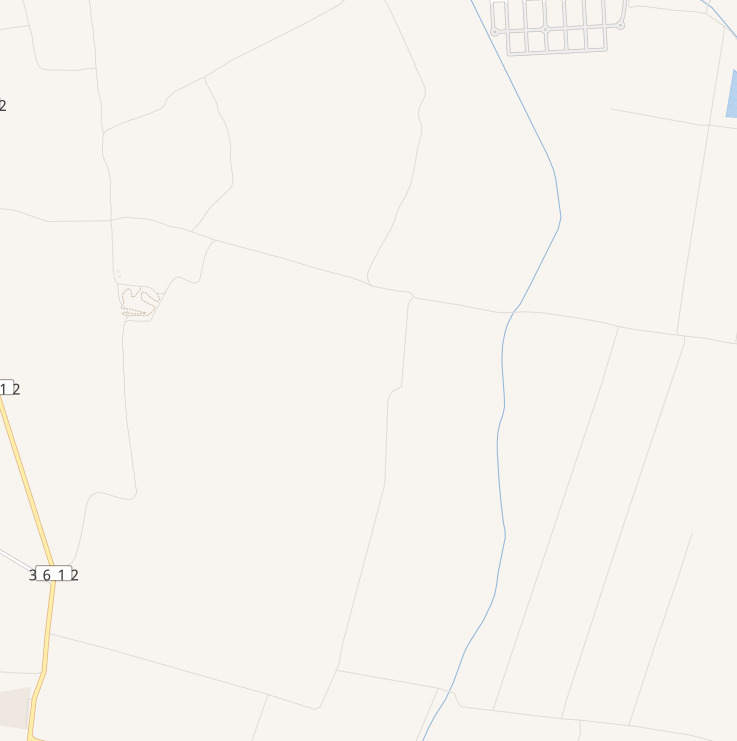
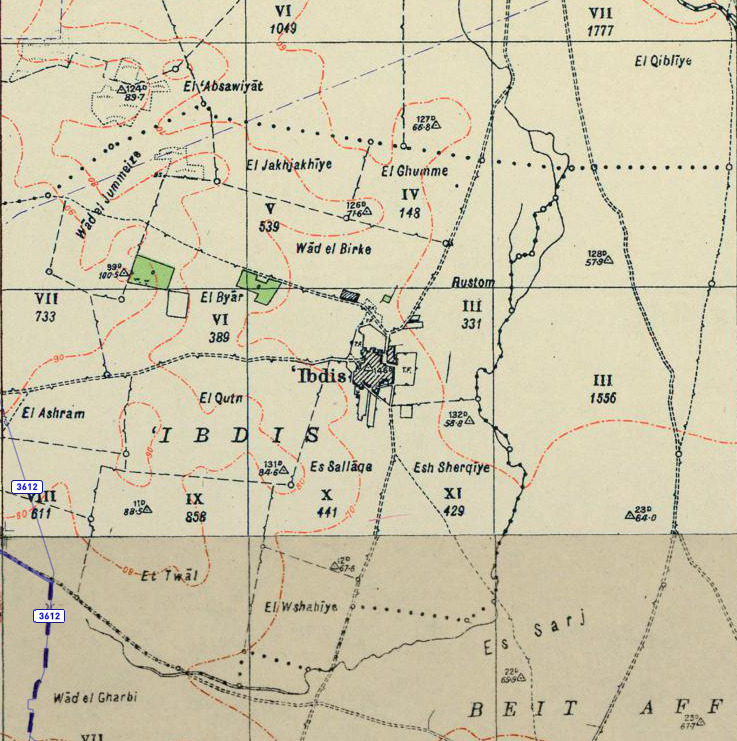
- 1870s map 1940s map modern map 1940s with modern overlay map A series of historical maps of the area around Ibdis (click the buttons)

- Location within Mandatory Palestine
- Coordinates: 31°40′39″N 34°41′55″E
- Palestine grid: 121/120
- Geopolitical entity: Mandatory Palestine
- Subdistrict: Gaza
- Date of depopulation: July 8–9, 1948

Area
  - Total: 4,593 dunams (4.593 km^{2}; 1.773 sq mi)

Population (1945)
  - Total: 540
- Cause(s) of depopulation: Military assault by Yishuv forces

'Ibdis (Arabic: عبدس, ‘Ibdis; Hebrew: עיבדיס) was a Palestinian village in the Gaza Subdistrict, located 30 kilometers (19 mi) northeast of Gaza City. It was situated on flat ground on the coastal plain at an elevation of 75 meters (246 ft) above sea level, and bordered by a wadi that bore its name on its eastern side. In 1945, Ibdis had a population of 540 and a land area of 4,593 dunams, of which 18 dunams were built-up areas.

== History ==
Tombs, dating to the sixth and seventh century CE, and Byzantine ceramics have been found here.

12 century Crusader church endowments and land deeds mention Latin settlement in the village, calling it Hebde. 'Ibdis was also inhabited in the 15th century. Mamluk records mention its endowment as a waqf.

=== Ottoman era ===
Under the Ottomans, in the 1596 tax records, Ibdis was a village in the nahiya of Gaza, part of the Sanjak of Gaza, with a population of 35 households, an estimated 193 people, all Muslims. The villagers paid a fixed tax rate of 33,3 % on various products, including wheat, barley, sesame, fruits, vineyards, beehives, and goats; a total of 8,100 akçe. Half of the revenue went to a waqf.

In 1838, it was noted as a village 'Abdis, located in the Gaza district.

Socin found from an official Ottoman village list from about 1870 that Ibdis had 12 houses and a population of 53, though the population count included men, only. Hartmann found that Abdis had 15 houses.

In 1882, the PEF's Survey of Western Palestine described it as a mid-sized village standing on open ground.

=== British Mandate era ===
During the British Mandate period, its houses were built of adobe brick and separated by narrow alleys. Toward the end of the Mandate period, new homes were constructed along the two roads that linked it with Majdal and the Jaffa Road. The village's Muslim community obtained water for domestic use from a 55 meters (180 ft) deep well. However, because the number of drilled wells was limited, the residents relied largely on rainfall for their crops. Ibdis was well known in the Gaza region for its quality grains, including wheat, barley, and sorghum. In the later period, fruit trees were grown, including grapes, apricots, and oranges.

In the 1922 census of Palestine, conducted by the British Mandate authorities, ‘Abdis had a population of 319, all Muslims, increasing in the 1931 census to 425, still all Muslims, in 62 houses.

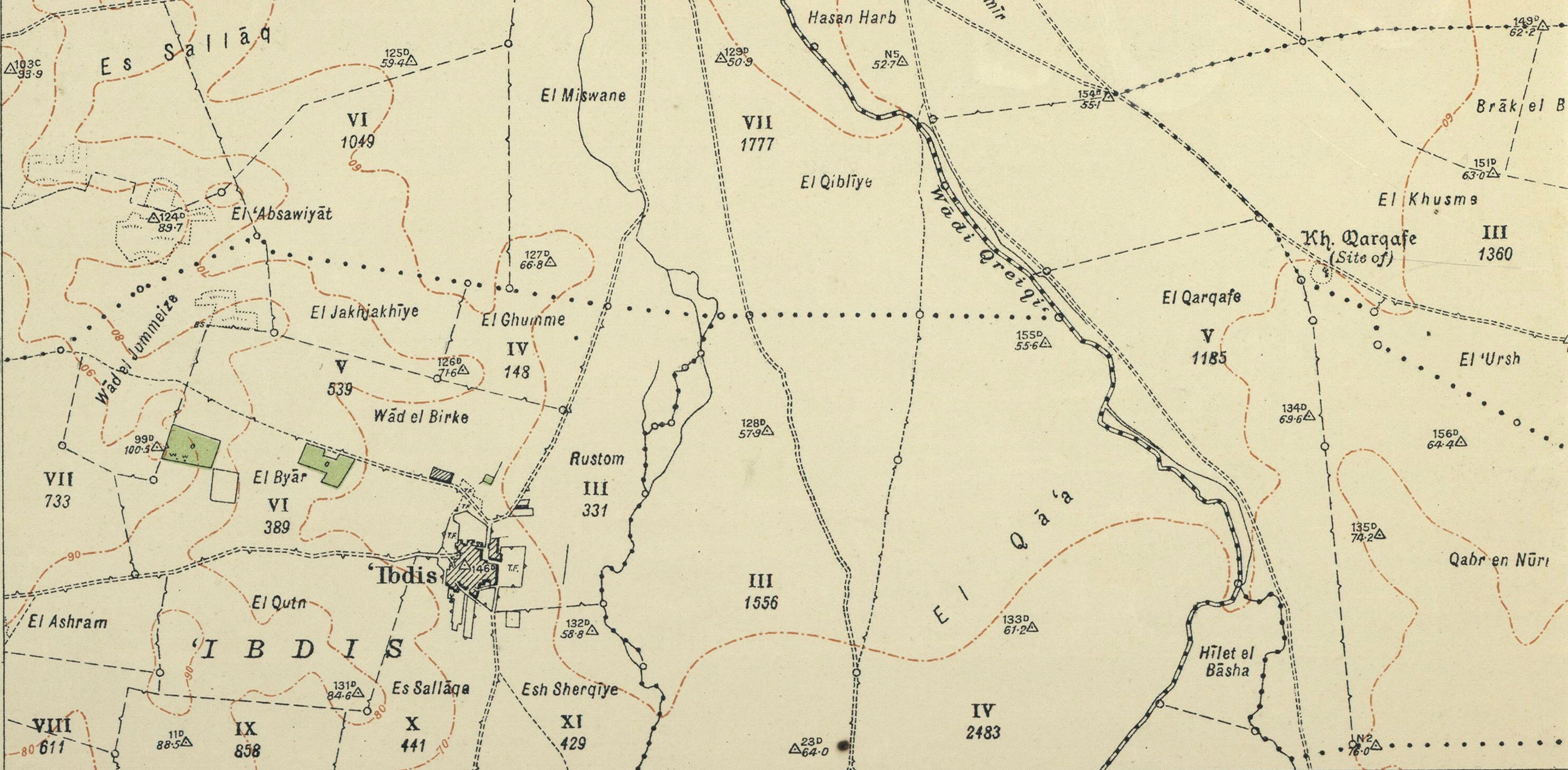
'Ibdis 1930 1:20,000

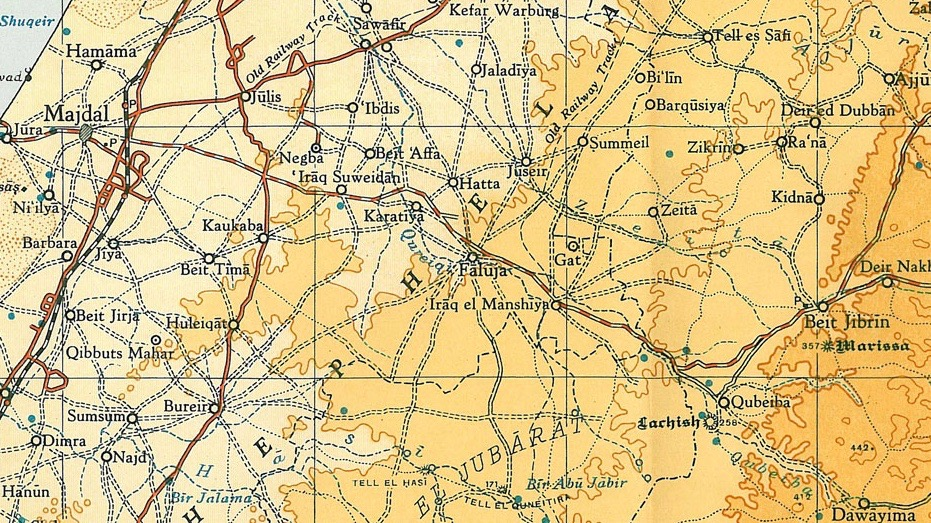
'Ibdis 1945 1:250,000 (NW Faluja)

In the 1945 statistics Ibdis had a population of 540, all Muslims, with a total of 4,593 dunams of land, according to an official land and population survey. Of this, 149 dunams were used for plantations and irrigable land, 4,307 for cereals, while 18 dunams were built-up land.

=== 1948 War, aftermath ===
The daily Palestinian newspaper Filastin reported in mid-February 1948 that Zionist forces arrived at Ibdis in three large vehicles on the evening of February 17. They were engaged by the local militia and a clash ensued which went on for over an hour, until the attackers retreated to Negba. According to the account, none of the residents were injured.

On July 8, as the first truce of the 1948 Arab-Israeli War was about to end, Israel's Givati Brigade moved on the southern front to link up with Israeli forces in the Negev. Although, they did not succeed in this mission, they managed to capture numerous villages in the area, including Ibdis. The Third Battalion of the brigade attacked the village at night, resulting in a 'long battle" with two companies of the Egyptian Army stationed there. The Israelis "only finished cleaning the position by the hours of the morning", according to Haganah accounts. It is unclear whether the inhabitants of Ibdis were expelled at that time, but the Haganah claims military equipment was taken was from the Egyptians.

Egyptian forces tried to recapture the village on July 10, but failed after suffering "heavy losses" when combating Israeli forces stationed there. According to the Haganah, the second Israeli victory at Ibdis was a turning point in the Givati advance, since onwards the brigade's forces did not withdraw from a single position until the end of the war. There was another failed attempt to capture the village on July 12. Egyptian president Gamal Abdel Nasser, who was a junior officer on this front recalled "On the first day of the truce the enemy [Israeli forces] moved against the Arab village of 'Ibdis which interpenetrated our lines".

Following the war the area was incorporated into the State of Israel. Merkaz Shapira was established nearby in 1948 and cultivates some land near the village site, but was, by 1992, not on Ibdis lands.

== See also ==
- Depopulated Palestinian locations in Israel

== Bibliography ==
- Barron, J.B., ed. (1923). Palestine: Report and General Abstracts of the Census of 1922. Government of Palestine.
- Conder, C.R.; Kitchener, H. H. (1882). The Survey of Western Palestine: Memoirs of the Topography, Orography, Hydrography, and Archaeology. Vol. 2. London: Committee of the Palestine Exploration Fund.
- Dauphin, C. (1998). La Palestine byzantine, Peuplement et Populations. BAR International Series 726 (in French). Vol. III : Catalogue. Oxford: Archeopress. ISBN 0-860549-05-4.
- Government of Palestine, Department of Statistics (1945). Village Statistics, April, 1945.
- Hadawi, S. (1970). Village Statistics of 1945: A Classification of Land and Area ownership in Palestine. Palestine Liberation Organization Research Center.
- Hartmann, M. (1883). "Die Ortschaftenliste des Liwa Jerusalem in dem türkischen Staatskalender für Syrien auf das Jahr 1288 der Flucht (1871)". Zeitschrift des Deutschen Palästina-Vereins. 6: 102–149.
- Hütteroth, W.-D.; Abdulfattah, K. (1977). Historical Geography of Palestine, Transjordan and Southern Syria in the Late 16th Century. Erlanger Geographische Arbeiten, Sonderband 5. Erlangen, Germany: Vorstand der Fränkischen Geographischen Gesellschaft. ISBN 3-920405-41-2.
- Khalidi, W. (1992). All That Remains: The Palestinian Villages Occupied and Depopulated by Israel in 1948. Washington D.C.: Institute for Palestine Studies. ISBN 0-88728-224-5.
- Mills, E., ed. (1932). Census of Palestine 1931. Population of Villages, Towns and Administrative Areas. Jerusalem: Government of Palestine.
- Morris, B. (2004). The Birth of the Palestinian Refugee Problem Revisited. Cambridge University Press. ISBN 978-0-521-00967-6.
- Nasser, G.A. (1955/1973): "Memoirs" in Journal of Palestine Studies
  - “Nasser's Memoirs of the First Palestine War” in 2, no. 2 (Win. 73): 3-32, pdf-file, downloadable
- Palmer, E.H. (1881). The Survey of Western Palestine: Arabic and English Name Lists Collected During the Survey by Lieutenants Conder and Kitchener, R. E. Transliterated and Explained by E.H. Palmer. Committee of the Palestine Exploration Fund.
- Robinson, E.; Smith, E. (1841). Biblical Researches in Palestine, Mount Sinai and Arabia Petraea: A Journal of Travels in the year 1838. Vol. 3. Boston: Crocker & Brewster.
- Socin, A. (1879). "Alphabetisches Verzeichniss von Ortschaften des Paschalik Jerusalem". Zeitschrift des Deutschen Palästina-Vereins. 2: 135–163.
