= List of battles and operations in the 1948 Palestine war =

Following are lists of battles and operations in the Civil War in Mandatory Palestine and the 1948 Arab–Israeli War

== Operations in the 1947–1948 Civil War in Mandatory Palestine ==
Name	Etymology / English translation	Date	Description
Battle for Jerusalem		February - March 1948	Jaysh al-Jihad al-Muqqadas attempt to blockade Jerusalem
Operation Hashmed	lit. Destroy	March 30, 1948	Haganah clearance of the Isdud–Yibna road
Operation Nachshon	Named for Nahshon	April 4–20, 1948	Haganah clearance of Arab forces blocking the road to Jerusalem
Battle of Mishmar HaEmek	—	April 5–9, 1948	Arab Liberation Army attempt to conquer the kibbutz of Mishmar HaEmek.
Battle of Ramat Yohanan	—	April 12–16, 1948	Battle in Ramat Yohanan between Druze and Haganah forces, leading to a Druze–Haganah alliance
Operation Harel	Named for Harel Brigade	April 15–21, 1948	Haganah clearance of Arab forces northeast of the Tel Aviv – Jerusalem road
Operation Bi'ur Hametz	lit. Destruction of bread (referring to cleaning one's house of bread on Passover)	April 21–23, 1948	Haganah capture of Haifa (Misparayim Plan)
Battle of Manshiyya	—	April 25–27	Irgun attack on the Manshiyya neighborhood of Jaffa, leading to British intervention
Operation Hametz	See Chametz	April 27 – May 13, 1948	Haganah capture villages east of Jaffa
Operation Yevusi	Named for Yevus, a name for Jerusalem and its first inhabitants.	April 22 – May 2, 1948	Haganah capture of buildings in Jerusalem's Western neighborhoods
Operation Yiftach	Named for Yiftach Brigade	April 15 – May 15, 1948	Haganah/Palmach capture of Safed and other villages in the eastern Galilee
Operation Matateh	lit. Broom	May 3–4, 1948	Part of Operation Yiftach; opening up Tiberias–Metula road
Battle of Safed	—	May 6–12, 1948	Part of Operation Yiftach; capture of Safed by Palmach forces
Operation Maccabi	lit. Maccabee	May 8, 1948	Haganah opening up the corridor to Jerusalem.
Operation Gideon		May 11, 1948	Haganah capture of Beit She'an and surrounding area.
Operation Barak	lit. Lightning	May 10–15, 1948	Capturing areas under responsibility of Givati Brigade
Operation Ben-Ami	Named after the KIA commander Ben-Ami Fechter	May 13–14, 1948	Capture of Acre and the coast up to the Lebanese border
Operation Schfifon	lit. Cerastes cerastes	May 13, 1948	Capture of buildings abandoned by British troops in the Old City of Jerusalem
Operation Kilshon	lit. Pitchfork	May 14–18, 1948	Capture of buildings abandoned by British troops to strengthen the Jewish military position in Jerusalem

== Arms acquisitions ==
Following is a list of operations undertaken by the Yishuv and later Israel to acquire munitions abroad.

Name	Etymology / English translation	Date	Description
Operation Balak	Named for Balak	March 31 – August 12, 1948	Aerial transport of arms acquisitions from Czechoslovakia
Altalena Affair	—	June 22, 1948	Irgun arms acquisition which led to Haganah's Operation Tihur (lit. Purifying) and the destruction of the Altalena ship
Operation Velvetta		September 24–27, 1948	Transport of Supermarine Spitfires acquired by Israel through Czechoslovakia

== First Phase of the 1948 Arab–Israeli War ==
Following is a list of operations between May 15, 1948—the Arab invasion of Palestine—and June 11, 1948—the first truce of the war.

Name	Etymology / English translation	Date	Description
Northern front
Battle of Malkiyya	—	May 13–15, 1948	Successful Lebanese capture of al-Malkiyya
Battle of Gesher	—	May 15–17, 1948	Failed Iraqi attack on Gesher
Battles of the Kinarot Valley	—	May 15–21, 1948	Successful Syrian capture Samakh and failed attack on Degania Alef and Degania Bet
Israeli raid on Syrian customs house	—	May 18–19	Successful Israeli raid on Syrian customs house, destroying vehicles and munitions, and creating an alliance with regional Bedouin
Operation Namel	lit. Port	May 22–23, 1948	Successful Israeli capture of al-Tantura (near Haifa)
Operation Erez	lit. Cedar	May 28–30, 1948	Preparation for Operation Yitzhak by capturing the area of Mount Gilboa
Operation Yitzhak		June 3, 1948	Israeli failure to capture Jenin
Battle of Mishmar HaYarden	—	June 10, 1948	Successful Syrian capture of Mishmar HaYarden
Battle of Ein Gev	—	June 10, 1948	Failed Syrian attack on Ein Gev
Jerusalem front
Battle for Jerusalem (May 15 – July 18, 1948); Arab (primarily Jordanian) siege of Jerusalem, ending in a stalemate. Israeli control of West Jerusalem, Jordanian control of East Jerusalem.
Battles of the Old City of Jerusalem	—	May 16–28, 1948	Jordanian capture of the Old City of Jerusalem
Battles of Jerusalem	—	May 19–30, 1948	Israeli–Jordanian battles in northern Jerusalem
Battles of Ramat Rachel	—	May 22–25, 1948	Seesaw battles in Ramat Rachel, ending in the failure of Egypt and Jordan to capture the village
Operation Bin Nun A	Named for Joshua Bin Nun	May 30, 1948	Israeli failure to capture Latrun
Operation Bin Nun B	Named for Joshua Bin Nun	June 1, 1948	Israeli failure to capture Latrun
Operation Yoram		June 8–9, 1948	Israeli failure to capture Latrun
Battle of Gezer	—	June 10, 1948	Successful Jordanian raid on Gezer
Southern front
Battles of Kfar Darom	—	May 13–15, 1948	Failed Egyptian army and Muslim Brotherhood attacks on Kfar Darom
Battle of Nirim	—	May 15, 1948	Failed Egyptian attack on Nirim
Battle of Yad Mordechai	—	May 19–24, 1948	Egyptian failure to capture Yad Mordechai, evacuation by besieged Israelis
First Battle of Negba	—	June 2, 1948	Failed Egyptian attack on Negba
Operation Pleshet	lit. Phillistia	June 2–3, 1948	Israeli failure to capture Isdud; successful stoppage of Egyptian advance
Battle of Nitzanim	—	June 7, 1948	Successful Egyptian capture of Nitzanim
Battle of Hill 69	—	June 10, 1948	Successful Egyptian capture of Hill 69 near Nitzanim

== Second Phase of the 1948 Arab–Israeli War ("Ten Day Battles") and the Second Truce ==
Following is a list of battles and operations between the first and second truces of the war—July 8, 1948—July 18, 1948. This period was named "Battles of the Ten Days" in Israel. Also listed are Israeli operations during the second truce.

Northern front
Name	Etymology / English translation	Date	Israeli units	Arab units
Operation Dekel	lit. Palm tree	July 9–18, 1948		
Successful Israeli capture of Nazareth and the Lower Galilee
Operation Brosh	lit. Cypress	July 9–18		
Unsuccessful Israeli attempt to drive the Syrian army out of Israel

Central and Jerusalem fronts
Name	Etymology / English translation	Date	Israeli units	Arab units
Operation Danny	Named after Danny Mas of the Convoy of 35	July 9–18, 1948		
Relief of Jerusalem and removal of threat on Tel Aviv—the planned capture of Lydda, Ramla, Latrun and Ramallah (abbr. Larlar). The first stage (Lydda and Ramla) met with success, and the second did not materialize.
Battles of the Mandelbaum Gate	—	July 9–19		
Seesaw battles for the Mandelbaum Gate area that ended in a stalemate
Operation Kedem	lit. East	July 16–17, 1948	62nd Battalion (Etzioni); Irgun and Lehi units	
Israeli failure to capture East Jerusalem

Southern front
Name	Etymology / English translation	Date	Israeli units	Arab units
Operation An-Far	Short for Anti-Farouk	July 8–15, 1948	Givati units	
Israeli failure to open a corridor from the center of the country to the Negev
Second Battle of Negba	—	July 12, 1948	Givati units; Local paramilitaries	9th Battalion (4th Brigade)
Egyptian attack on Negba repulsed
Battle of Be'erot Yitzhak	—	July 15, 1948	9th Battalion units (Negev); Local paramilitaries	3rd Battalion
Egyptian attack on Be'erot Yitzhak repulsed
Operation Death to the Invader	—	July 16–18, 1948	Givati units; Negev units; 89th Battalion (8th Brigade)	
Israeli failure to open a corridor from the center of the country to the Negev

Second truce
Name	Etymology / English translation	Date	Israeli units	Arab units
Operation Shoter	lit. Policeman	July 24–26	33rd Battalion (Alexandroni); 15th Battalion units (Golani); Carmeli units; Military police units	Local paramilitaries
Israeli capture of the "little triangle" south of Haifa, to relieve the Tel Aviv – Haifa road
Operation GYS 1	Abbreviation for Golani, Yiftach, Sergei	July 27, 31, 1948	53rd Battalion (Givati); 1st Battalion (Yiftach)	
Israeli failure to open a corridor from the center of the country to the Negev
Operation GYS 2		July 31, 1948	Samson's Foxes (Givati); Yiftach units	
Successful Israeli escort of a convoy to the Negev enclave
Operation Avak	lit. Dust	August 23 – October 21, 1948	Israeli Air Force; Yiftach Brigade	
Israeli Air Force operation to transport food, supplies and soldiers to the Negev enclave

== Third Phase of the 1948 Arab–Israeli War ==
Following is a list of battles and operations from the second truce of the war up to the 1949 Armistice Agreements.

Name	Etymology / English translation	Date	Description
Northern front
Battle of Sheikh 'Abd	—	October 22–23	Battles in and around the Israel–Lebanon border position of Sheikh 'Abd end in a ceasefire
Operation Hiram		October 24–29, 1948	Israeli expulsion of Fawzi al-Qawuqji's Arab Liberation Army and capture of the Galilee
Jerusalem front
Operation Ha-Har	lit. The Mountain	October 19–22, 1948	Israeli operation to extend the Jerusalem Corridor to the south
Operation Yekev	lit. Winery	October 19–21, 1948	Successful Israeli capture of certain positions around Jerusalem, failure to take the outskirts of Beit Jala
Southern front
Operation Yoav (October 15–22, 1948); Named after KIA commander Yitzhak "Yoav" Dubno; Successful lifting of the Egyptian siege on Jewish settlements in Negev
Battle of the Beit Hanoun wedge	—	October 15–22, 1948	Israeli capture of Beit Hanoun in order to create a wedge between Egyptian forces to the north-northeast and south
Battles of the Separation Corridor	—	October 15–22, 1948	Successful lifting of the Egyptian siege on Jewish settlements in Negev
Operation Moshe	Named after Moshe Albert, KIA in Beit Eshel	October 21, 1948	Israeli capture of Beersheba
Operation Egrof	lit. Fist	October 15–16, 1948	Israeli aerial bombardment of Egyptian bases in Operation Yoav
Naval campaign in Operation Yoav	—	October 16–22, 1948	Naval engagements between Israel and Egypt, including sinking of the Egyptian flagship Emir Farouk
Northern Negev campaign after Operation Yoav	—	October 27 – November 9, 1948	Israeli capture of Bayt Jibrin, Isdud and Majdal, and other important points, culminating in Operation Shmone
Operation Shmone	lit. Eight	November 9, 1948	Israeli capture of the Iraq Suwaydan police fort
Operation Lot	Named for the Biblical character Lot	November 23–25, 1948	Israeli link-up with the enclave at Sodom
Operation David		November 29–30, 1948	Sinking of the Lebanese navy ship Igris, formerly German auxiliary ship Grille, Adolf Hitler's private yacht
Operation Assaf		December 5–7, 1948	Israeli attack against Egyptian thrust into the Negev on the Gaza–Beersheba road
Operation Horev (December 22, 1948 – January 7, 1949); Removal by Israel of Egyptian presence in the Negev (except the Gaza Strip), and operations in the Sinai peninsula
Battle of Hill 86	—	December 22–23, 1948	Israeli failure to capture the strategic Hill 86 in the Gaza Strip
Battle of Bir Thamila	—	December 25–26, 1948	Israeli capture of Bir Thamila and its surroundings, on its way to the Sinai
Battle of al-Auja	—	December 25–27, 1948	Israeli capture of Auja al-Hafir, a village bordering Egypt
Battles of the Sinai	—	December 28, 1948 – January 2, 1949	Israeli encirclement of the Egyptian forces in the Gaza Strip by entering the Sinai Peninsula. The forces were withdrawn following international pressure.
Battle of Rafah	—	January 3–8, 1949	Failed Israeli attack on numerous positions south of Rafah
Operation Hisul	lit. Liquidation	December 27–28	Failed Israeli attack on Iraq al-Manshiyya
Operation Uvda	lit. Fact (named for objective of creating facts on the ground)	March 5–10, 1949	Establishing Israeli sovereignty in the Negev
Operation Yitzuv	lit. Stabilization	March 7–9, 1949	Part of Operation Uvda; Israeli capture of parts of the Dead Sea's western shores and linking up with Ein Gedi

== See also ==
- 1947–48 Civil War in Mandatory Palestine
- 1948 Arab–Israeli War
- Killings and massacres during the 1948 Palestine War
- Depopulated Palestinian locations in Israel

== Bibliography ==
- Tal, David (2004). War in Palestine, 1948: strategy and diplomacy (Illustrated ed.). Routledge. ISBN 978-0-7146-5275-7.
