= Battle of Nirim =

Battle of the 1948 Arab–Israeli War

Coordinates: 31°14′20.25″N 34°20′17.36″E

- Part of the 1948 Arab–Israeli War
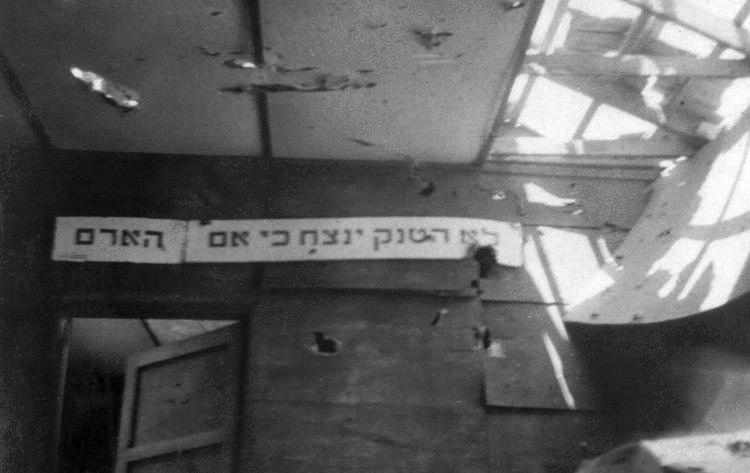
- Sign erected in the Nirim dining hall in 1948 for the May Day celebrations, on one of the few surviving walls in the village. The sentence reads "Not the tank shall prevail, but the man", and became an icon of Nirim's successful stand
Date	May 15, 1948
Location	Nirim, Israel
Result	Israeli victory

Belligerents
Israel (Haganah)	Egypt

Commanders and leaders
Haim Bar Lev (8th Btn.)	

Strength
39–45	500–800

Casualties and losses
7 killed	30–35 killed

The Battle of Nirim was a military engagement between the Egyptian army and the Jewish Haganah militia on May 15, 1948, the first day of the Egyptian invasion of Israel in the 1948 Arab–Israeli War. It was fought in kibbutz Nirim, founded just two years earlier as part of the strategic settlement push known as the "11 points in the Negev". The Egyptian 6th Battalion attacked about 40 Israeli defenders at dawn on May 15, backed by armored vehicles, mortars, cannons and aircraft. They failed to take the village and retreated about 7 hours later, leaving behind about 30–35 dead.

== Background ==
The first stage of the 1948 War, referred to as the 1947–1948 Civil War in Mandatory Palestine, started following the ratification of UN Resolution 181 on November 29, 1947, which granted Israel the mandate to declare independence, dividing the Mandate into a Jewish state and an Arab state. The state of Israel was declared on May 14, 1948, and the next night, the armies of a number of Arab states invaded Israel and attacked Israeli positions.

Kibbutz Nirim was founded in June 1946 as part of the 11 points in the Negev initiative, a response to the Morrison–Grady Plan for the partition of Palestine. On October 5–6, 1946, new olim left Gvulot to create Nirim to the west and Urim to the south. Nirim was located in close proximity to the new Egypt–Israel border, and the southernmost locality near the coastal road, the Egyptian army's main advance path.

At the first stage of the Egyptian invasion, a division-sized force under General Ahmed Ali al-Mwawi moved along the coastal road towards Majdal. Since there was only one line of movement, Mwawi feared for his supply lines, and attacked the Jewish villages threatening them most. Nirim and Kfar Darom were the first such villages. Nirim was perceived as an immediate threat to the Egyptian staff units at Rafah. The Bedouins of the area left previously on Arab order, also knowing that the kibbutz would be targeted.

== Positions and distribution of forces ==
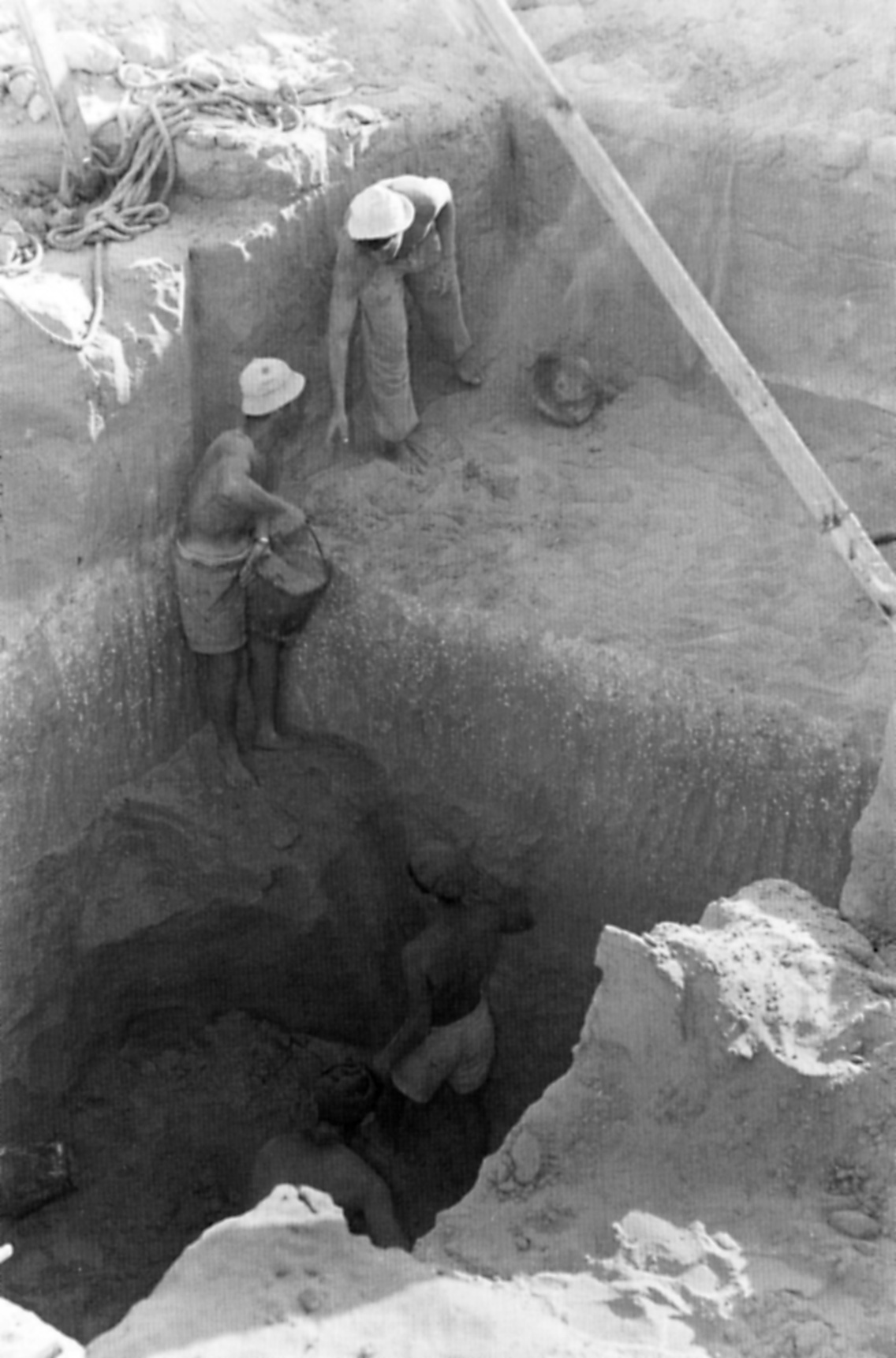
Members of Nirim digging underground positions

The Israeli defenders were all members of Nirim itself, 39–45 in number, 12 of them women. They were subordinate to the Negev Brigade's 8th Battalion, commanded by Haim Bar-Lev. The village was fenced and mined; its members had a total of 34 rifles and submachine guns, two light machine guns and one 52 mm (2") mortar. Avraham Adan, then a commander of a mobile company in the Negev Brigade's 8th Battalion, wrote that the defenders were well-trained and conditioned, even by Palmach standards.

The Egyptian force consisted of about 500–800 troops from the 6th Infantry Battalion, backed by armored vehicles including at least 20 Bren carriers, 81 mm (3") mortars, 2-pound and 6-pound cannons, and aircraft. A battery of 25-pound artillery was stationed in the area of Rafah. They were not prepared for the battle and had insufficient intelligence of the Israelis. According to Gamal Abdel Nasser, the adjutant of the battalion, the infantry was "slow and [...] without energy".

The Israeli firing positions were located in the four corners of the kibbutz, numbered clockwise (Position 1 in the southeast, 2 in the southwest, etc.). Another position was located next to the gate in the west. Most of the buildings were made of wood, except the "Safety House" made of reinforced concrete next to Position 1. No water tower had been built there yet, but construction had started next to Position 2. The medical and communication facilities, as well as the command bunker, were located underground in the center of the village.

== Battle ==
On May 15 at 05:30, the Egyptian forces were spotted advancing at the kibbutz. At 07:00, a massive artillery barrage from Rafah commenced, lasting a full hour and causing devastating damage, injuring 12 village members, and severing telephone and radio contact with the rest of the Israeli forces. About 400 m outside the kibbutz, the Egyptian infantry disembarked from their vehicles and the force split into two main wings: much of the infantry circled and attacked from the north-northwest, while the majority of the armor attempted an attack on the main gate in the west. Radio contact was restored, but came and went for the length of the battle.

Nearby Israeli villages had additional troops, but they did little to alleviate the pressure on Nirim. According to Avraham Adan, himself a member of Nirim, whose company assembled at nearby Mivtahim, Bar Lev opposed trying to break the Egyptian ranks and did not believe Adan's company capable of doing so. One Israeli squad disguised in Arab traditional garments, however, was sent to the kibbutz to gather intelligence and reconnoiter the area. Another squad, at the request of the defenders, was sent from Tze'elim. Bar Lev also sent three command cars to the area as a diversion.

The Egyptian infantry, while receiving cover fire from 2" mortars, did not have sufficient means to breach fences, and around noon, after fierce fighting, was forced to retreat. Meanwhile, individual Egyptian armored vehicles and 3" mortar teams surrounded the village and shelled it from several directions. The main force halted and exchanged fire outside the gate, short of the clearly labeled minefield. At approximately 12:30, they too began to retreat. The Egyptian artillery continued shelling the kibbutz for two additional days. Shells that fell between 15:00 and 19:00 caused a fire in the village's armory.

== Aftermath and reactions ==
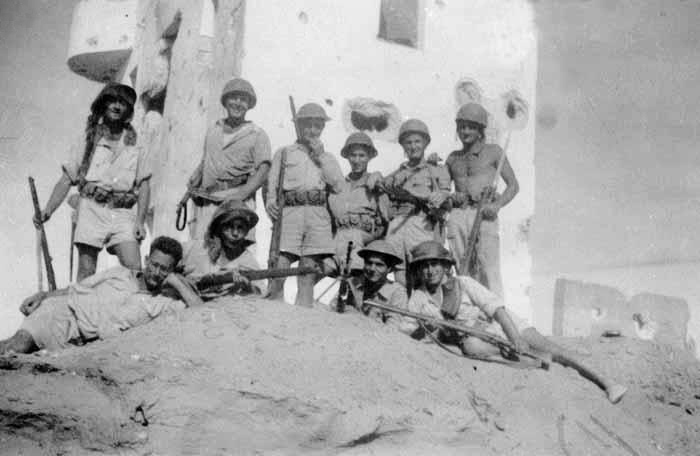
Soldiers at Nirim after the battle. The Safety House is in the background

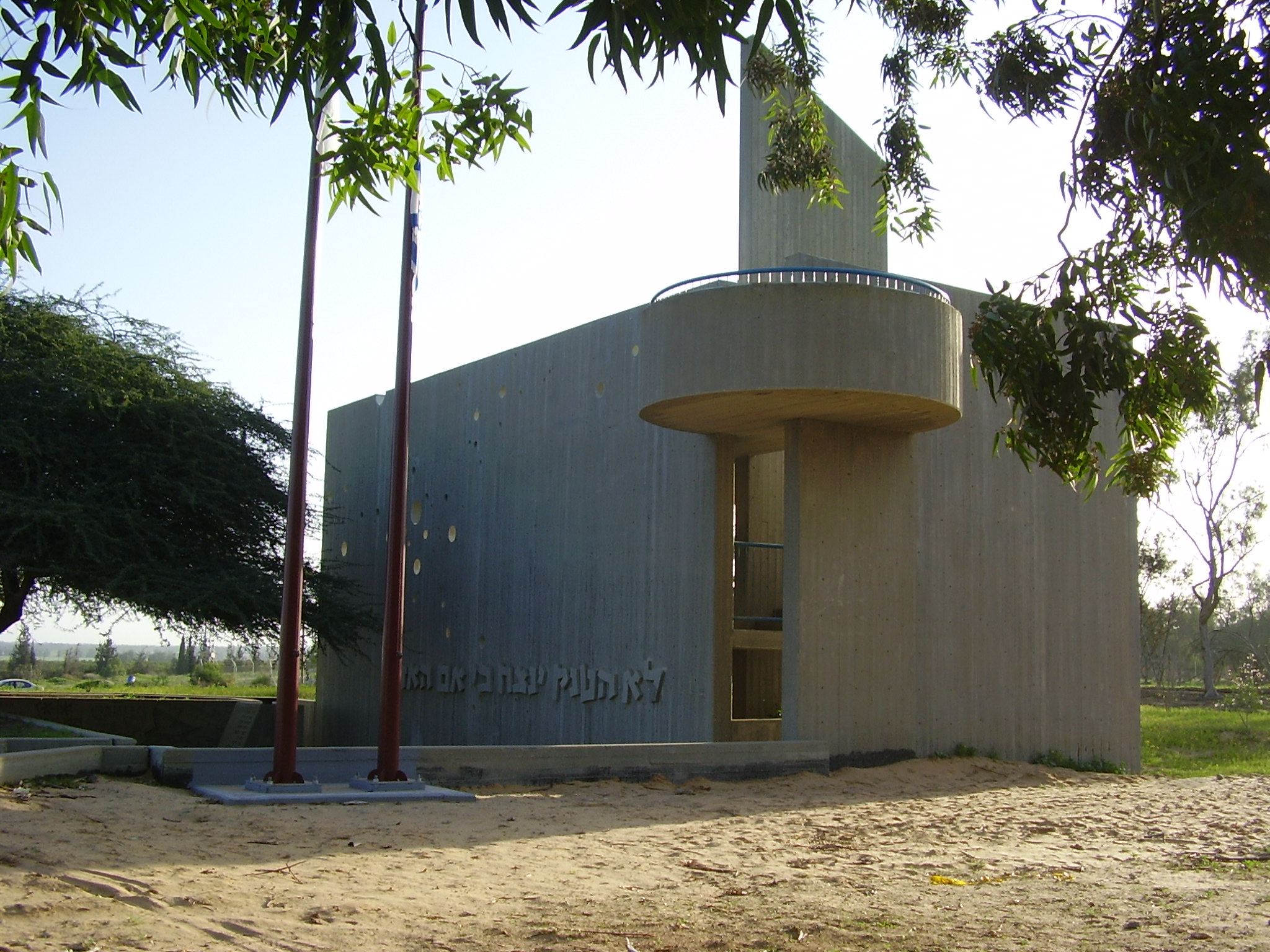
The monument at the battle site

Seven Israeli soldiers were killed in the battle, including the regional commander and one woman, Rivka Salzman, a Holocaust survivor. The Egyptians killed in action were about 30–35, and according to Israeli estimates, about 40% of them died of friendly fire. All of the buildings of Nirim were wholly or partially destroyed. The seven Israelis were buried in a common grave outside the village by reinforcements that came after the battle.

The Cairo Radio declared that the kibbutz had been captured, and the Egyptians returned to their base for a victory parade. In fact, Nirim remained in constant Israeli control until the end of the war. The Egyptian army took the time to reorganize (additionally hurt by a defeat at Kfar Darom) and attacked kibbutz Yad Mordechai four days later.

The Israelis began restoring the damaged trenches and fortifications in Nirim, expecting another attack shortly, and the next morning it indeed appeared as if the Egyptians were going to attack again, creating a smoke screen in front of the village. However, the attack did not come. Because of the intermittent shelling, in the days following the battle the residents of Nirim were forced to continue living underground and faced numerous related hardships. Elisha Kali, a kibbutz member, invented a mirror-based contraption that provided light to the bunkers by automatically moving two mirrors so that they always reflected sunlight.

Haim Bar Lev later said that the battle of Nirim decided the outcome of the war, because if 45 lightly armed Israeli soldiers could stand against great odds, all of Israel could withstand the war. On the Egyptian side, Gamal Abdel Nasser commented that "I felt that the dead left behind at Dangour symbolized the battalion's [lack of] faith in the cause for which it was fighting".

A monument to the fallen at Nirim is located on the site of the village. It incorporates two symbols of the battle: the Safety House and the sign that had been hanged in the dining hall two weeks earlier in the May Day celebrations, reading "Not the tank will prevail, but the man".
