= Operation Death to the Invader =

1948 Israeli military operation

Coordinates: 31°38′37.45″N 34°44′40.27″E

- Part of the 1948 Arab–Israeli War
Date	July 16–18, 1948
Location	Northwestern Negev
Result	Egyptian victory; Israeli failure to accomplish objectives

Belligerents
Israel; (Israel) IDF	Egypt; Muslim Brotherhood

Commanders and leaders
(Israel) Shimon Avidan (GVB) (Israel) Nahum Sarig (Negev) (Israel) Moshe Dayan (89th)	(Egypt) Ahmed Ali al-Mwawi (Egypt) Ahmed Abdel-Aziz; Hassan al-Banna

Strength
4,800	5,000

Casualties and losses
200	Unknown

Operation Death to the Invader (Hebrew: מִבְצָע מָוֶת לַפּוֹלֵשׁ), also Death to the Invaders, was an Israeli military operation during the 1948 Arab–Israeli War. It was carried out on July 16–18, 1948 in the northwestern Negev desert. The operation's objective was to link Jewish villages in the Negev desert with the rest of Israel, after this aim was not achieved in Operation An-Far that ended on July 15. The Egyptians blocked Israeli access to its Negev villages during the first truce of the war (June 11 – July 8), by taking up positions on the Majdal – Bayt Jibrin road, where most of the battles of Death to the Invaders were fought.

The operation started with a series of raids on Egyptian bases and Palestinian Arab villages on July 16–17, including Jilya, Qazaza, Idnibba, Mughallis, Zayta, Isdud and Bayt Jibrin. It was followed on July 17–18 by assaults on Bayt 'Affa, Hill 113, Kawkaba and Huleiqat, which all failed. Finally, on July 18, the Israelis captured Hatta and Karatiyya, successfully fending off a last-minute Egyptian counterattack before the second truce of the war went into effect.

== Background ==
Jewish settlement efforts in the northern Negev desert, such as the Three lookouts (1943) and the 11 points in the Negev (October 1946), created a reality whereby a large Jewish enclave existed within predominantly Arab-inhabited territory. The latter effort was a response to the Morrison–Grady Plan for the partition of Palestine, and was instrumental in the final decision of the United Nations Special Committee on Palestine for the Palestine Partition Plan.

The Egyptian Army invaded Israel on May 15, 1948, following Israel's declaration of independence on the previous day. They attacked Nirim and Kfar Darom at first, and their main column advanced up the coastal road northwards. On May 19, they attacked Yad Mordechai, and stopped at the Sukreir Bridge on May 29, where they dug in following the Israeli Operation Pleshet. From that point until the first truce of the war, they attacked several wholly or partially surrounded Jewish villages, including Negba (June 2) and Nitzanim (June 7).

Up to the start of the second stage of the 1948 Arab–Israeli War, the Negev enclave was linked to the rest of the Jewish-held areas by a narrow waist between Bror Hayil and Negba through Kawkaba, Huleiqat and the internal Negev road, taken by Jewish forces in Operation Barak on May 12, 1948. The waist was overlooked by the Iraq Suwaydan police fort, which was handed over by the British to the Egyptian Muslim Brotherhood forces also on May 12, even before Egypt officially entered the war. The contingents were "loosely managed" from Egypt. Up to the first truce of the war on June 11, Israeli convoys could safely pass through the Negev road, but in the beginning of the truce, Egypt fortified themselves along the east–west Majdal – Bayt Jibrin road and disconnected the enclave from the rest of Israel.

== Prelude and Operation An-Far ==
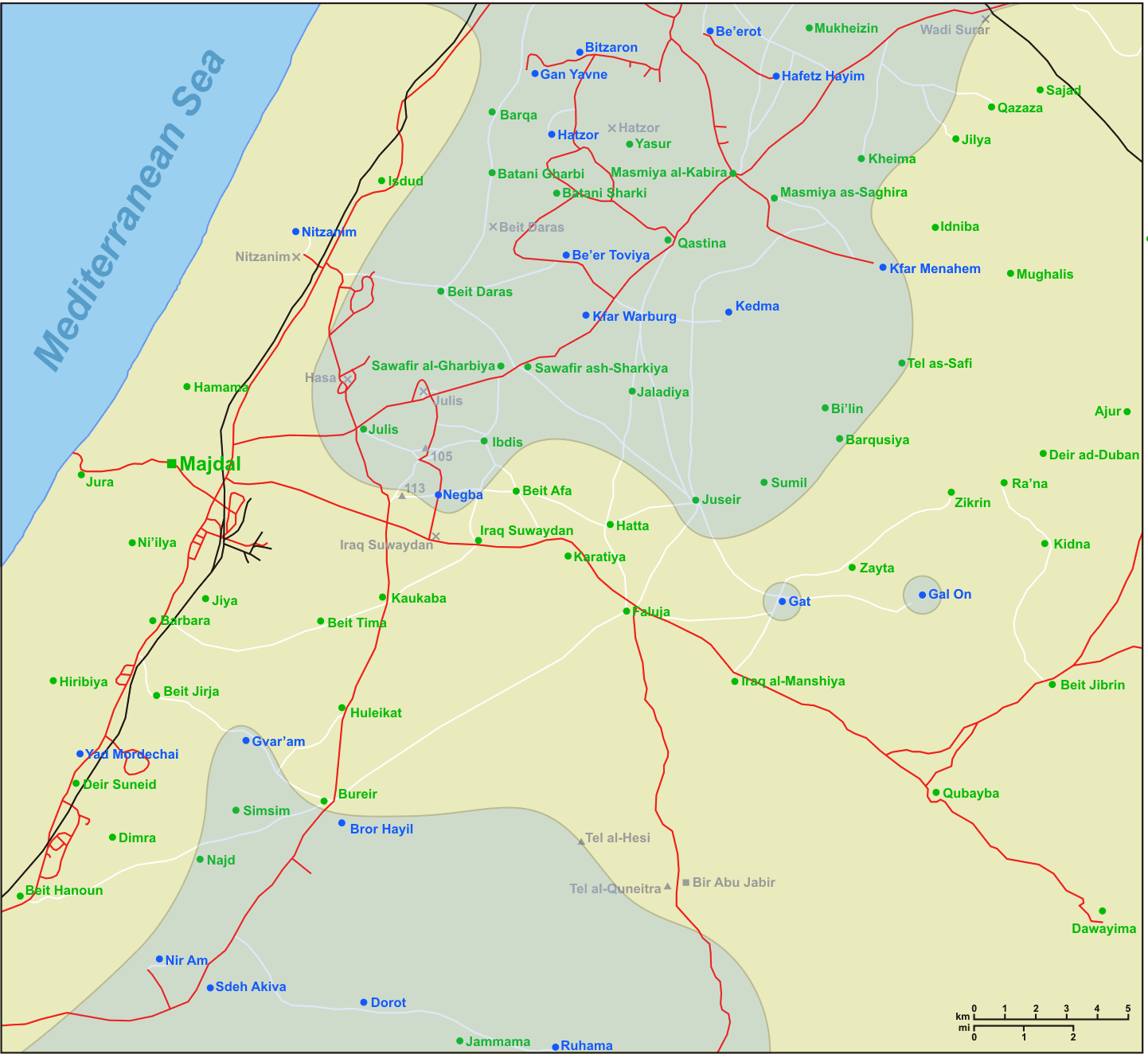
Approximate Israeli front line at the end of Operation An-Far

With the anticipated end to the first truce of the war on July 9, 1948, each side planned its own offensives in the Majdal – Fallujah – Bayt Jibrin area. The Israeli plan was called Operation An-Far (short for Anti-Farouk), and its objective was to open up a permanent supply route to the Negev enclave. Another objective was to sever Egypt's supply route from the main concentration along the coastal road to the secondary one in the area of Hebron and Bethlehem. The Egyptians, for their part, sought to widen their narrow waist and relieve the forces along the coast of the Israeli threat.

The Egyptians, attacking at 06:00 on July 8, before the formal end of the ceasefire, managed to preempt Israel and quickly captured Kawkaba and Huleiqat. Additional assaults on Israeli positions in Beit Daras, Julis and Negba were repelled. The Israeli operation was started on the night of July 8–9, when the Givati Brigade set out in two forces (east and south) to attack Egyptian and local Arab forces. The eastern wing took Masmiyya, Qastina, Tina and Tell es-Safi. The southern wing took Ibdis and the village of Iraq Suwaydan. A simultaneous attack by the Negev Brigade on the Iraq Suwaydan police fort failed.

Hostilities resumed on July 10–11, when Givati raided Isdud, and the Egyptian army staged a failed counterattack on Tell es-Safi. They did however take the Husseima position overlooking kibbutz Gal On. Another Egyptian attack on Julis was also repelled. The biggest Egyptian thrust came on July 12, when it sent a reinforced brigade to Negba, Ibdis and Julis, with a disastrous result that, along with the Egyptian army's ammunition shortage, turned the tide clearly in Israel's favor. On July 12–14, Givati fought for and recaptured Hill 105 next to Negba, and repelled an Egyptian attack on Barqa. On July 13–14, Israeli units blew up a bridge next to Bayt Jibrin and on July 14, repelled an Egyptian attack on Gal On. On July 14–15, the sides waged a seesaw battle for Hatta and Bayt 'Affa.

Although exhausted from seven days of fighting and not accomplishing their objectives, IDF units in the area achieved a measure of success and started preparations to exploit it. The General Staff feared that the United Nations Security Council would impose a ceasefire while the Negev was disconnected, as the exact date of the truce had not been known yet, with the UNSC meeting taking place on July 16, two days after the General Staff meeting. The General Staff therefore ordered a last-ditch effort to break through, reinforcing the Givati Brigade with Moshe Dayan's 89th Mechanized Assault Battalion of the 8th Brigade and units from the Israel Navy. While the objective of Death to the Invader was essentially the same as that of An-Far, the method in which it was meant to be carried out was different—while in An-Far, the connection with the Negev would be made on the internal road, between Julis and Bureir, in Death to the Invader it would be between Iraq Suwaydan and Fallujah, through Karatiyya.

== Raids of July 16–17 ==
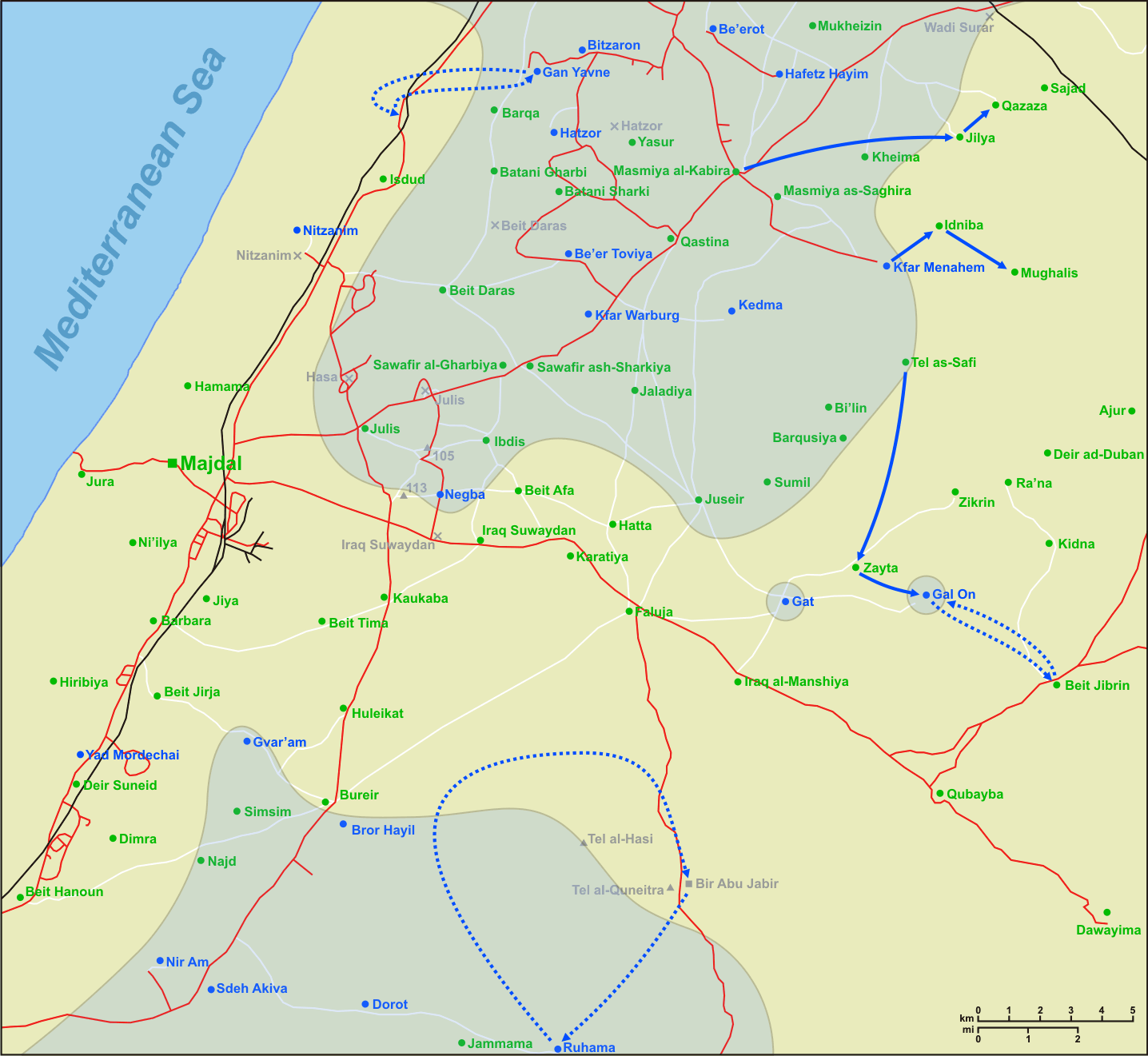
Movements on July 16–17 (dotted lines indicate raids)

Operation Death to the Invader in fact started with advances against Palestinian Arab localities, not Egyptians. On the night of July 16–17, IDF units set out from Masmiyya, Tell es-Safi and Kfar Menahem to clear their flanks. They mainly captured villages which were depopulated after the fall of Tell es-Safi: Jilya, Qazaza, Idnibba and Mughallis. The southern wing took Zayta and staged a raid on Bayt Jibrin. At the same time, forces from Gan Yavne circled Wadi Sukreir and raided the Sukreir Bridge. The Egyptians returned artillery fire on Gan Yavne, Bitzaron and Hatzor.

The Negev Brigade's 9th Battalion meanwhile captured Bir Abu Jabir (a regional water well), south of Fallujah, which had been defended by a Muslim Brotherhood platoon.

== Battles of July 17–18 ==
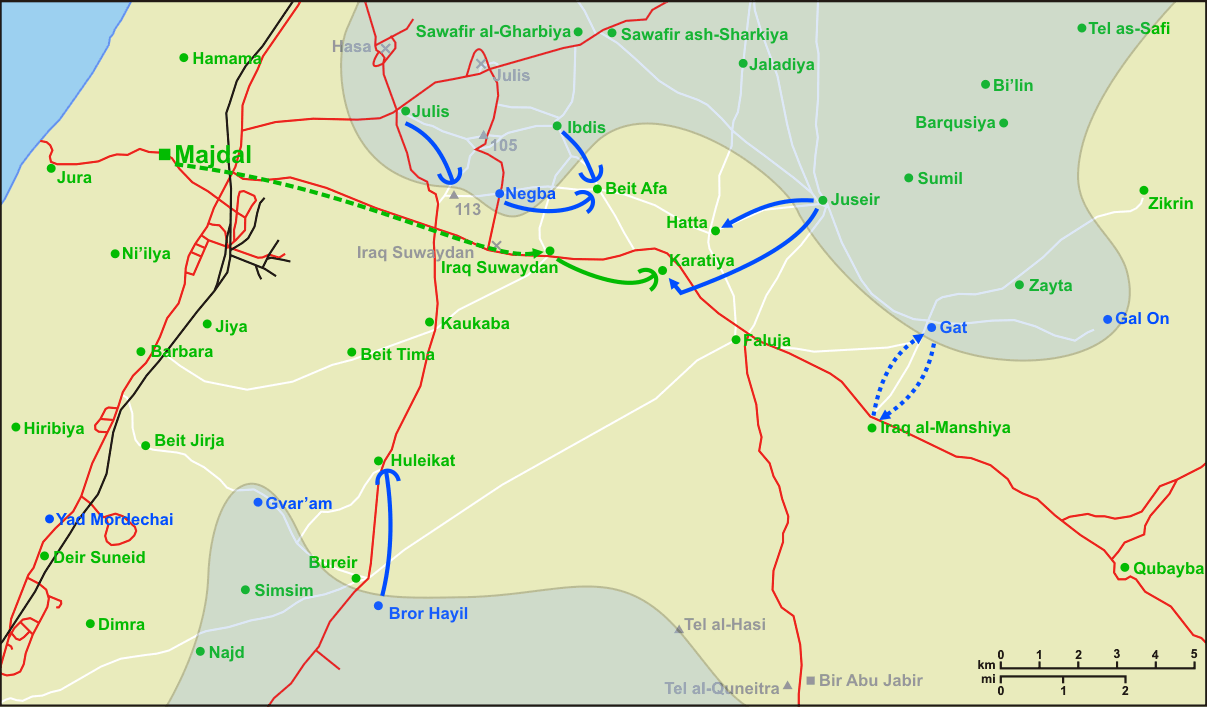
Movements and battles on July 17–18

Beit 'Affa, located about 2 km east of Negba, was defended by a well-entrenched Egyptian unit. On the night of July 17–18, Israel attacked in the strength of two companies: one from the 54th Battalion of Givati, and the other was Shayetet 11 from the navy, subordinated to the 54th's commander. The naval unit advanced through a wadi from the north, hoping to surprise the Egyptians, but were in fact spotted while preparing to set up. At midnight, they emerged and attacked in two prongs, and despite heavy fire, managed to capture a frontal position and pushed ahead to the center of the village, setting up there and exchanging fire with the Egyptians. By that time, most of its commanders were wounded.

Meanwhile, the Givati company set out from Negba and circled Bayt 'Affa, attacking from the south. They came quietly, but due to lack of intelligence, were unaware of barbed wire fences in the southern end of the village. They were thus pinned down and failed to advance, and no operational reserve was allocated that could assist them. Seeing this, at 03:00, the battalion commander issued an order to withdraw, and jeeps were brought from Negba to help in this endeavor. However, the naval company was in a dire situation and did not have a viable retreat path. In addition, one of its units did not hear the order. The retreat was therefore disorderly and numerous dead and missing were left in the field. The naval company suffered 19 dead, 3 captured and 28 wounded.

On the same night, Israeli forces set out from Julis to take over Hill 113, just west of Negba. The attack failed and they retreated. A raid was also conducted against Iraq al-Manshiyya. The Negev Brigade for its part was meant to retake Kawkaba and Huleiqat, but had absolutely no intelligence on the Egyptian and Saudi units and their defenses in the area. They attacked Hill 131.2, just northeast of Huleiqat, and Hill 138 (the main position of Huleiqat itself), suffering 21 dead. Seven wounded were rescued after the battle.

== Battles of Hatta and Karatiyya ==
While naval and 54th Battalion units were fighting at Bayt 'Affa, the 52nd, 53rd and 89th battalions set out to capture Hatta and Karatiyya. The mission of taking Hatta was given to a company from Givati's 52nd Battalion, and for Karatiyya, the IDF sent the 89th Battalion, a company from the 53rd, and a number of sappers and commandos from the 52nd to block possible reinforcements. The forces left their staging area at Jusayr at 22:00 on July 17. The company from the 52nd quickly overpowered the Egyptian defenses at Hatta by sending a small force to pin them down while circling the village from the south, competing the mission by midnight.

The 89th's forces moved south to the small airport between Fallujah and Hatta. At 22:30, they encountered small arms fire and them mortar and artillery fire from Fallujah, while making their way across the airport. They stopped at Wadi Mufarar, just south of Karatiyya, which they could not cross. Engineering works were undertaken for several hours until a crossing was created. Meanwhile, the 53rd's company worked on disconnecting the communications between Karatiyya and Fallujah and destroying culverts under the road. While the other units were preparing to the south of Karatiyya, the 52nd Battalion's sappers made their way to the road connecting Karatiyya with Iraq Suwaydan and blew up a bridge there. They also set up a roadblock closer to Iraq Suwaydan, and returned to their base. When the company from the 53rd Battalion reached the 89th Battalion, the latter mistook them for Egyptians and opened fire. However, the mistake was quickly discovered and the joint force set out for Karatiyya, taking it at dawn.

They attempted to fortify their positions as best they could, in anticipation of the Egyptian counterattack. Munitions, including anti-tank weapons, were brought through Hatta (as planned) to assist them. The counterattack started at 08:30 on July 18; Egyptian forces at Iraq Suwaydan opened artillery fire on Karatiyya and armored vehicles closed in from Fallujah and Bayt 'Affa to block possible Israeli reinforcements. After minor skirmishes in the morning that yielded no result, the Egyptians staged a major assault in the afternoon, in two prongs, each employing tanks and armored vehicles in front and infantry in the rear. After a tank from the northwestern prong took a hit from an Israeli PIAT, shot by Ron Feller, the entire northwestern force turned back. Feller got the Hero of Israel Citation (which later became the Israeli Medal of Valor), one of 12 in the war, for his actions. The southeastern prong subsequently had no choice but to retreat, which they did in an orderly fashion. The second ceasefire of the war came into effect at 19:00 on the same day, stopping further hostilities for the time and ending the Ten Days period of the war.

== Aftermath ==
While the Israelis were successful in several attacks, most notably in Hatta and Karatiyya, the main objective of linking up the Negev and Givati areas was not reached, and going into the second truce, the Negev villages remained an enclave surrounded by Egyptian positions. However, the capture of Hatta and Karatiyya, to the south of the Majdal – Bayt Jibrin road, forced the Egyptians to create a "Burma Road" between Iraq Suwaydan and Fallujah. The operation ended the Ten Days period of the war, between the first and second ceasefires, with few territorial changes in the south. According to the Egyptian commander in Palestine, Ahmed Ali al-Mwawi, the situation at the end of this period for the Egyptian army was not good, owing to a lack of ammunition, coordination and morale.

Historian David Tal attributes the Israeli operational failure to the lack of cooperation between the Givati and Negev brigades and the lack of offensive initiative. Neither the Givati nor Negev brigades got serious manpower boosts to replace their losses, and both were forced to allocate significant forces and resources to static defense. In that light, Tal asserts that the Egyptians succeeded more than the Israelis during the Ten Days, as they mostly achieved their aim of strengthening the wedge between the Negev and the rest of Israel, linking up their own forces in the Bethlehem–Hebron area to the coastal ones.

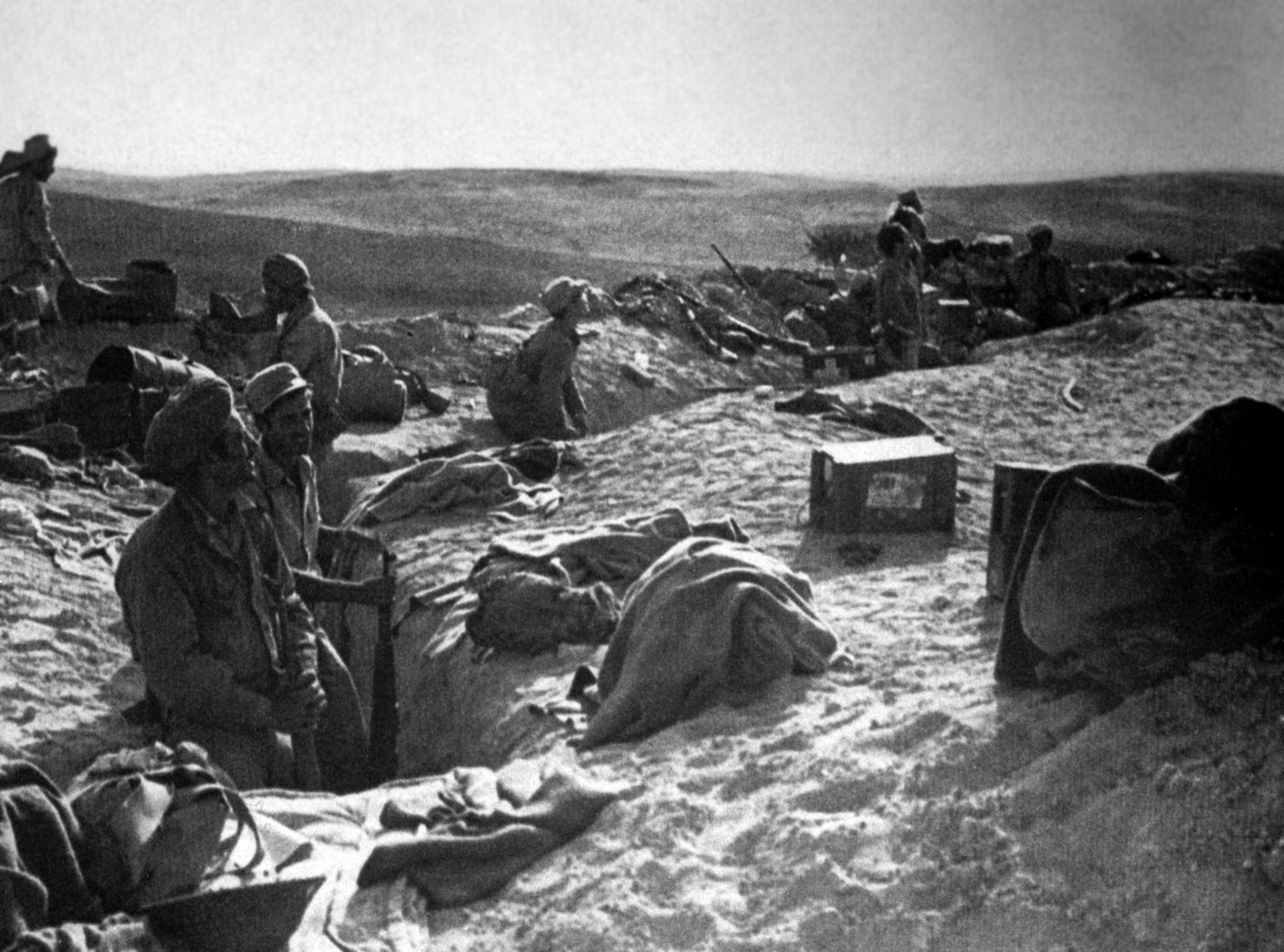
Israeli troops occupying abandoned Egyptian trenches at Huleiqat, October 1948

The Israelis captured almost all the areas fought for in Operation Death to the Invader in Operation Yoav. The internal Negev road from Julis to Bror Hayil through Kawkaba and Huleiqat was taken on October 17–20, 1948 by Givati's 52nd and 54th battalions. Upon taking Huleiqat, the Israelis discovered a mass grave where the Egyptians buried Israeli casualties of the failed July 17–18 Negev Brigade attack.

== See also ==
- Depopulated Palestinian locations in Israel
