= Battles of Negba =

Battles between Israeli and Egyptian forces in Negba

Coordinates: 31°39′39.24″N 34°40′59.16″E

- Part of 1948 Arab–Israeli War
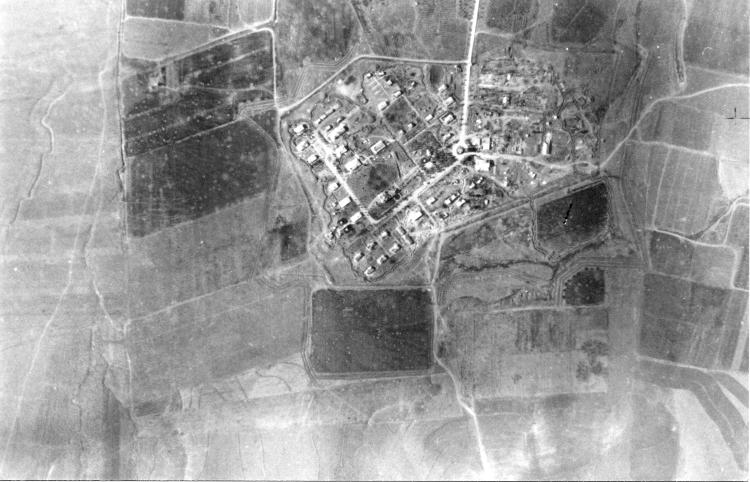
- Negba, 1948
Date	June 2, 1948 (1st battle); July 12, 1948 (2nd battle)
Location	Negba, Israel
Result	Israeli victory

Belligerents
Israel (IDF)	Egypt

Commanders and leaders
Shimon Avidan (Givati); Yitzhak "Yoav" Dubno (local, KIA)	Ahmed Ali al-Mwawi; Muhammad Naguib (4th Brig.); Sa'ad ad-Din Rahmani (9th Btn.)

Strength
~140	Reinforced battalion

Casualties and losses
8 killed, 11 wounded (1st battle); 5 killed, 16 wounded (2nd battle)	Israeli estimates: ~100 killed and wounded (1st battle); ~200–300 killed and wounded (2nd battle)

The Battles of Negba were a series of military engagements between the Israel Defense Forces and the Egyptian army in the 1948 Arab–Israeli War. Negba, a kibbutz founded in 1939, had a strategic position overlooking the Majdal – Bayt Jibrin road, and was a target of two major assaults by the Egyptians in June and July 1948.

On June 2, the Egyptians attacked the village from the south with a battalion reinforced with armor, artillery, and aircraft, and were beaten back by 140 defenders, who were assisted by motorized Negev Brigade forces. The second attack took place on July 12, when the Egyptians staged diversionary assaults on nearby positions and surrounded Negba from all sides, again with a reinforced battalion. This attack was also dispersed, and Negba remained in Israeli hands, serving as a forward base for attacks against Egyptian forces up to Operation Yoav.

== Background ==
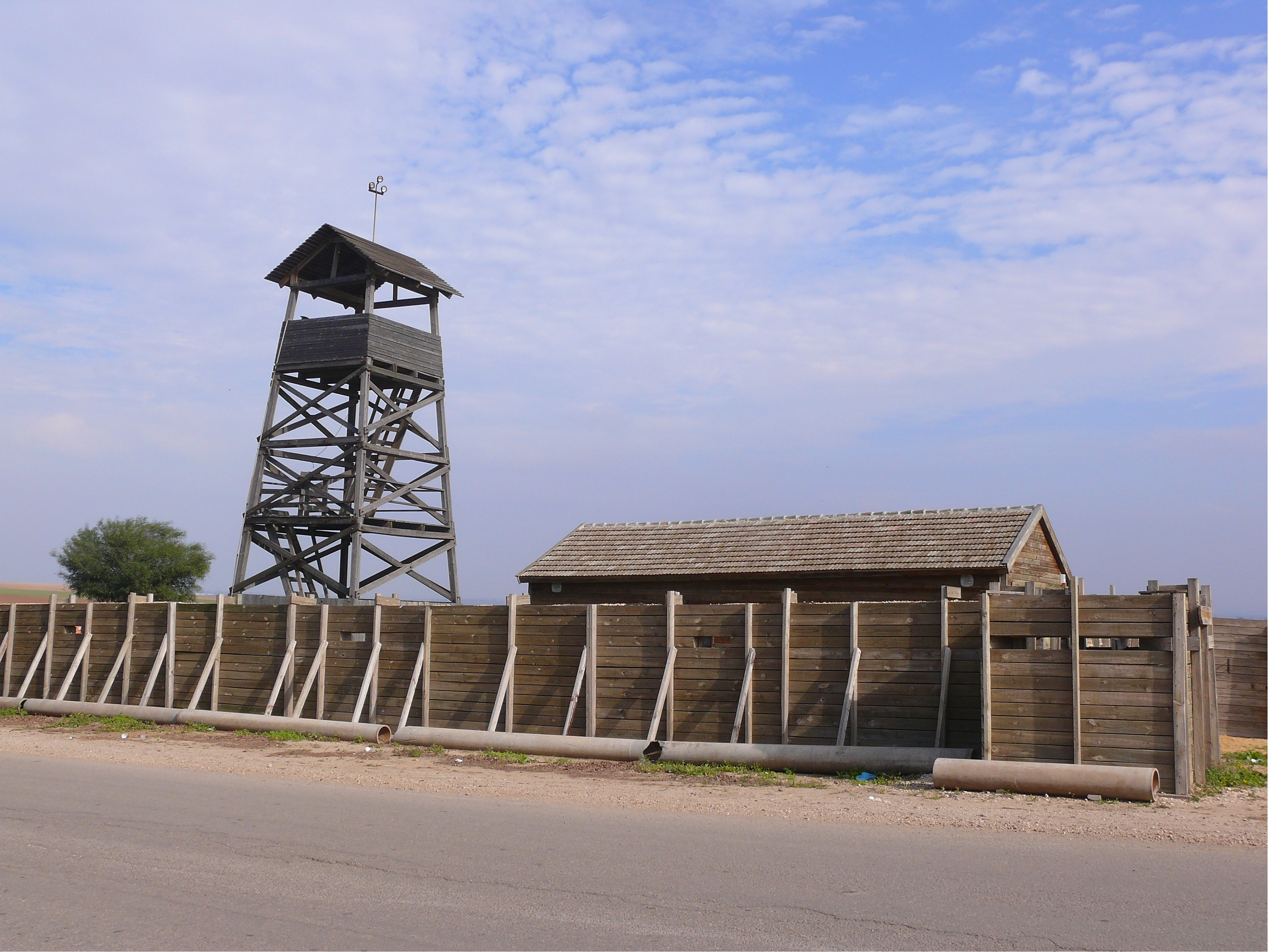
Negba's "tower and stockade"

Kibbutz Negba was founded in 1939 as a tower and stockade settlement, the first lasting modern Jewish settlement in the Negev desert. At the outset of the second stage of the 1948 Arab–Israeli War, Negba was the southernmost village of the main Israeli-controlled land mass, and was not isolated like the nearby Nitzanim, Kfar Darom and the northern Negev settlements mainly founded as part of the 11 points in the Negev plan.

The Egyptian army invaded Israel on May 15, after Israel's declaration of independence on the previous day. Its main force moved up the coastal road, and engaged in a battle in Kfar Darom on May 15 and the Battle of Yad Mordechai on May 19–24. The column reached Majdal on May 14. From there, forces were sent north to Isdud, reaching it on May 29, and to Bayt Jibrin through Fallujah on June 1, cutting a wedge between Israeli-held northern Negev and the rest of Israel. They finally disconnected the Negev by taking up position on the Majdal – Bayt Jibrin road during the first truce of the war (June 11 – July 8).

Negba was located in an area surrounded by a number of hills, especially the police fort at Iraq Suwaydan 1.7 km to the south. The kibbutz was adjacent to a number of other strategic positions, including "The Junction", a road intersection between the Majdal – Bayt Jibrin road and the road from Kawkaba to Julis. Its defense was organized into 13 positions at the perimeter, connected by communication trenches, with the main gate in the north and the headquarters in the middle. Underground shelters were spread out throughout the entire village. A road passed from north to south in the village, but the Israelis left only the northern approach open, which was also close to an airplane landing strip.

== First skirmishes and battle of June 2 ==
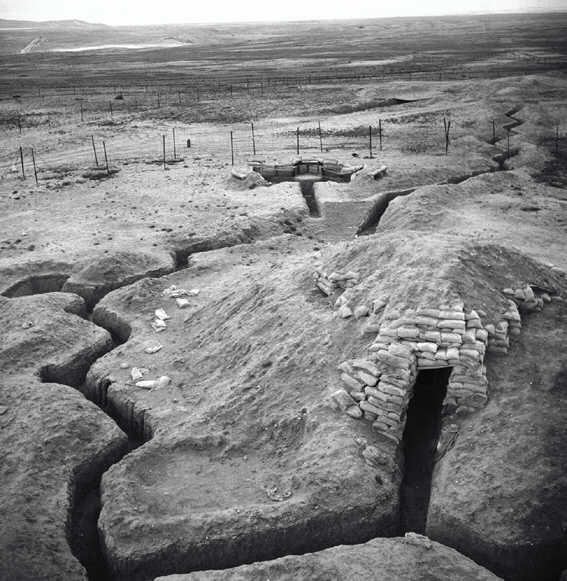
Negba defences 1947

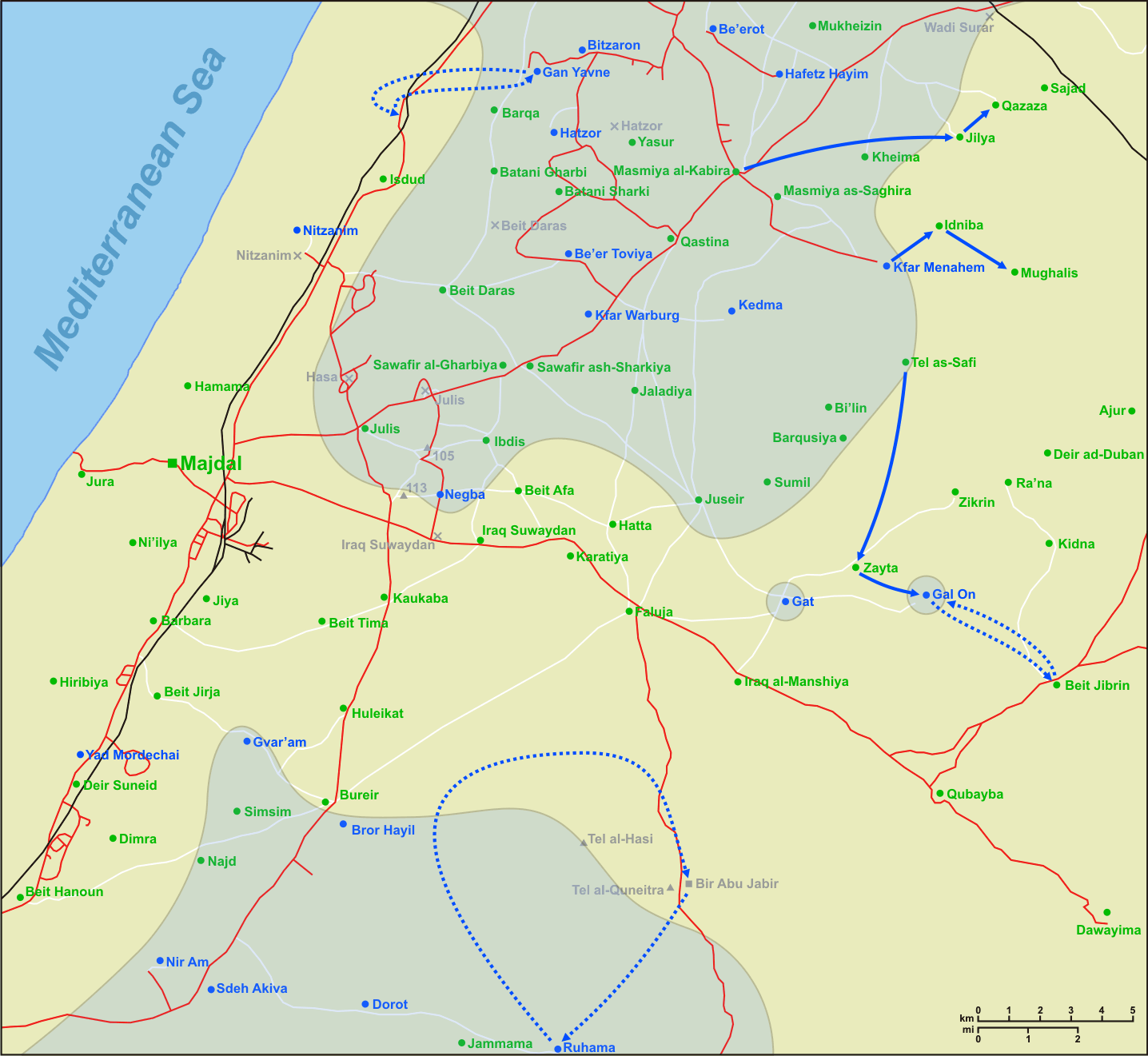
Zones under Israeli control (in blue) on May 16, 1948

On May 12, 1948, even before Egypt's invasion, Egyptian volunteer units from the Muslim Brotherhood, which was backing the campaign in Palestine, took control of the Iraq Suwaydan police fort following the British withdrawal. Two Israeli attempts were made to capture it—on the same day and on May 18–19—but both failed. On May 21, an Egyptian motorized unit made a deterrent raid on Negba. This was accompanied by aircraft bombardment, which killed the Israeli regional commander, Yitzhak "Yoav" Dubno, who was attempting to shoot down aircraft. Operation Yoav was named in his honor, as was the Iraq Suwaydan police fort, following its capture by Israel. The Egyptians continued to harass Negba in the following days, and the Givati Brigade decided to send two platoons from its 53rd Battalion, as well as mortars, as reinforcements. The brigade's forces also occupied Julis (May 27–28) in order to control a position from which further reinforcements to Negba could be provided.

On the day of the Egyptian attack on June 2, the Israeli forces in Negba numbered about 70 Givati Brigade soldiers and 70 village residents (including 10 women). They had a total of 80 rifles, 200 hand grenades, 500 Molotov cocktails, 20 submachine guns, 8 machine guns, 3 two-inch mortars, 2 three-inch mortars and one PIAT. The Egyptian force consisted of the 1st Infantry Battalion, supplemented by a tank company, an armored car company and three field artillery batteries (one 3.7" and two 25-pounder). They planned to surround the kibbutz and attack from all directions.

The Egyptian forces started the attack with an artillery barrage on the night of June 1–2. Their column then moved eastward on the Majdal – Bayt Jibrin road, attacking Negba from the south in three armored prongs. Egyptian machine gun positions provided cover fire from Bayt 'Affa and 'Ibdis in the east and northeast, respectively. In all, seven tanks and 12 armored cars reached within 100 m of the village's southwestern perimeter at about 07:00 on June 2 (positions 6–8). One of them reached Position 6 which was completely destroyed, but withdrew under heavy fire from Position 7. Two others encountered land mines. At the same time, the Egyptian infantry with armored and air support attacked from the northeast but was repelled.

Shimon Avidan, the Givati Brigade commander, used Negev Brigade forces under his command (originally earmarked for Operation Pleshet) to assist Negba. A jeep unit from the Negev Beasts Battalion was sent to the west of the kibbutz to harass the Egyptian flank. At the same time, an Israeli 25-pound cannon stationed at Kfar Warburg opened up a barrage against Iraq Suwaydan's fort. By 11:00, the Egyptian forces decided to withdraw under a smoke screen. Negba suffered 8 dead and 11 wounded, while the Egyptian losses were estimated by Israel at 100 killed and wounded.

== Battle of July 12 ==
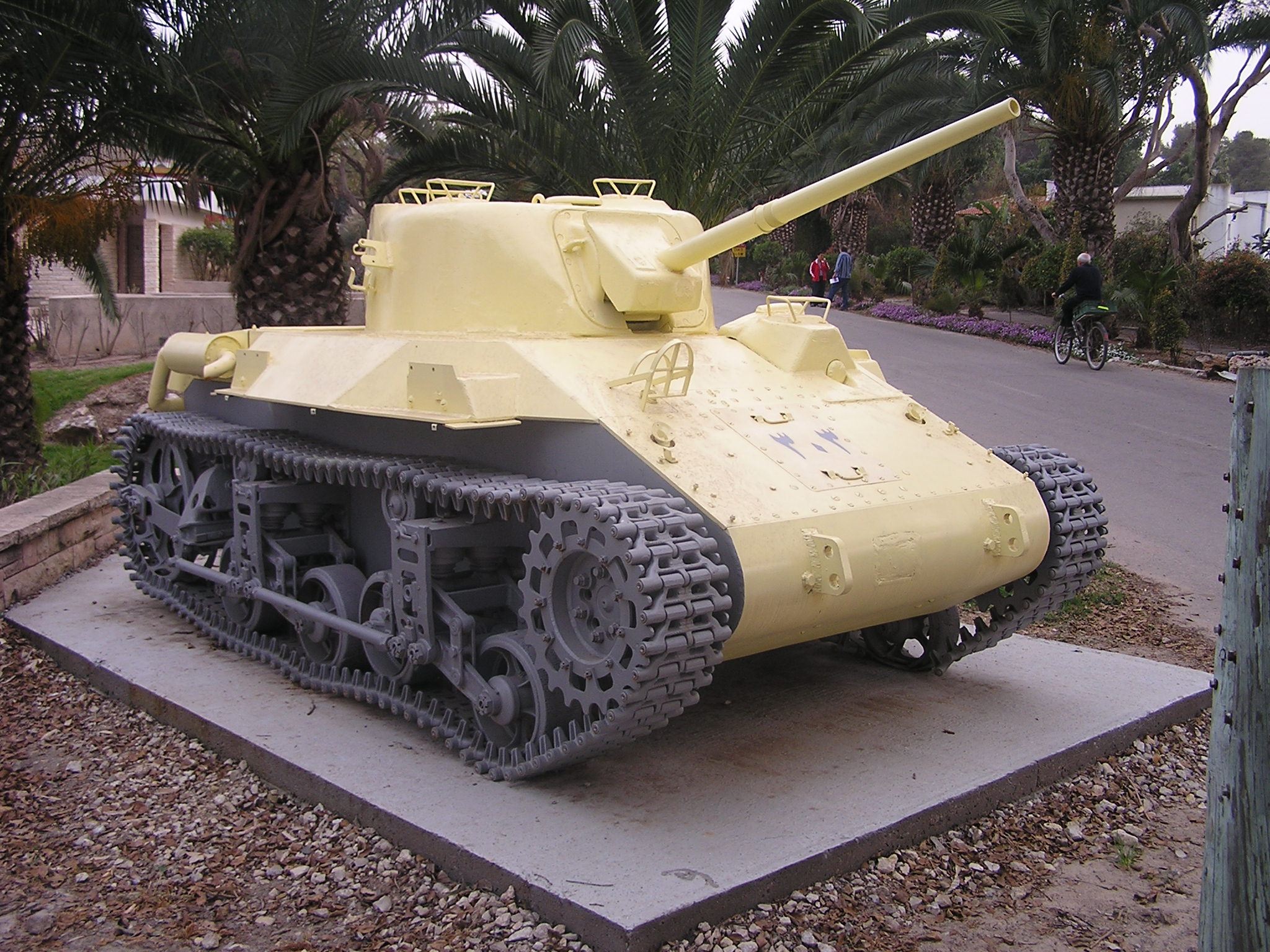
Captured Egyptian M22 Locust tank, given as a compromise to Negba in 1953, preserved in the kibbutz

The second Egyptian attack on Negba constituted the pinnacle of their effort during the Battles of the Ten Days, the period between the first and second truces of the war. The Egyptians allocated a reinforced brigade (the 4th) to the task, part of which (2nd and 6th battalions) conducted diversionary operations at 'Ibdis and Julis. The composition of the force used to attack Negba itself was similar to the previous attempt—an infantry battalion, assisted by one tank company and one armored vehicle company, complemented by artillery and air support. The infantry battalion was the 9th, commanded by Sa'ad ad-Din Rahmani, which had seen success in the Battle of Nitzanim and Hill 69.

Unlike the previous battle, the Egyptians made good on their plans to surround the village, in order to prevent outside Israeli intervention. By 06:00, Negba was encircled and forces stood ready to move in. An initial artillery barrage from surrounding position (Bayt 'Affa, Hill 113 to the west and Hill 105 to the north) commenced at 07:00, with a more concentrated effort at 08:45, and an air raid at 08:00. At 11:00, armored and infantry forces started moving against the village from three directions (west, south, east). The simultaneous Egyptian attacks were poorly coordinated however, and the infantry and armor did not work well together. Negba's defenders held out, although the initial effort reached a distance of 50 m from the perimeter. The Egyptians regrouped at 16:00 and attempted a final thrust from the north. Achieving no success, the Egyptians retreated at 18:00, leaving behind one tank (a Fiat M13/40) and four Bren carriers. Israel estimated Egyptian losses at 300 killed and wounded. The Israeli casualties were 5 killed and 16 wounded.

The aforementioned M13/40 tank that was abandoned by its crew during the battle was the subject of a skirmish and a controversy. At night after their retreat, Egyptian forces tried to pull it back to their own lines, but an Israeli sapper had managed to mine the tank's surroundings. Several days later, an IDF armored serviceman helped rescue the tank and took it for repairs and reuse. The residents of Negba demanded an alternative tank as a war trophy, and five years later they were granted an M22 Locust. Although it lacked a gun barrel, one was attached by the Armored Corps, and the tank has remained in Negba since.

== Aftermath ==
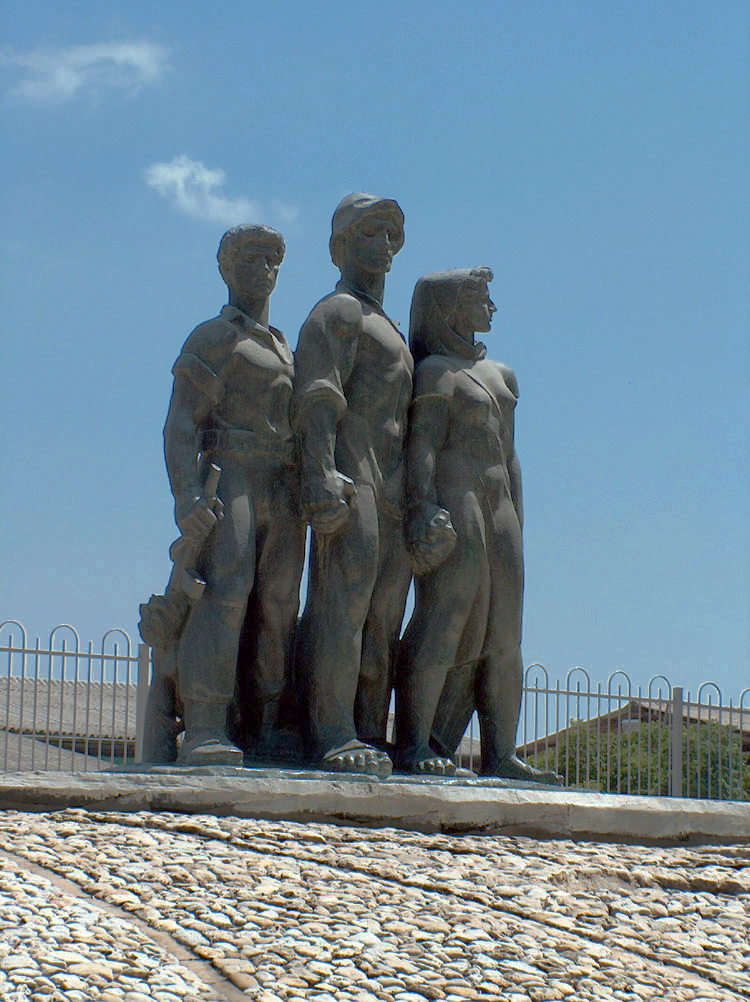
The monument at Negba

After July 12, the Egyptians did not attack Negba again, but made an attempt to surround it by sending a Sudanese company to capture Hill 105 to the north. Israel subsequently used Negba as a base for future operations in an attempt to cut through the Egyptian lines and link up with the Israeli-held enclave in the northern Negev. Some of the areas immediately surrounding Negba were captured in the days following the second battle during Operation An-Far. After battles on the night of July 12–13, Givati reported that it was in control of Hill 105 on 00:30 on July 14. Operation Death to the Invader on July 16–19 failed to take Bayt 'Affa, Iraq Suwaydan and Hill 113 however. These areas were captured on October 16–17 (Hill 113) and November 9–11 (Bayt 'Affa, Iraq Suwaydan) during Operation Yoav.

Both of Negba's successful stands had a significant symbolic value in Israel, especially among the working–settlement class. The commander of the Egyptian forces in Palestine, Ahmed Ali al-Mwawi, dismissed Muhammad Naguib (commander of the 4th Brigade) over the defeat. Naguib would later lead the military coup against the Egyptian government. This battle is considered to be the turning point on the southern front during the period between the first and second truces of the war. The culture office of the Givati Brigade, Abba Kovner, compared the defense to the Battle of Stalingrad, referring to it as Negbagrad.

A monument to commemorate the Israeli fallen, by sculptor Nathan Rapoport, was erected at the military cemetery in the village, at the request of Yisrael Barzilai. The sculpture depicts a male farmer and a female nurse who is a girl (the parents), and their son, a soldier. The monument is made of bronze and is 4 m tall. It symbolizes a will for defense, the work toward a better future, and the IDF's supply shortage, shown by the fact that the soldier isn't wearing a helmet. After the 1979 Egyptian–Israeli Peace Treaty, the Egyptians requested to place a memorial for its own fallen in Negba as well. Due to local opposition, the monument was placed in nearby Sde Yoav.
