= Haim Bar-Lev =

Israeli military officer and politician (1924–1994)

- חיים בר־לב
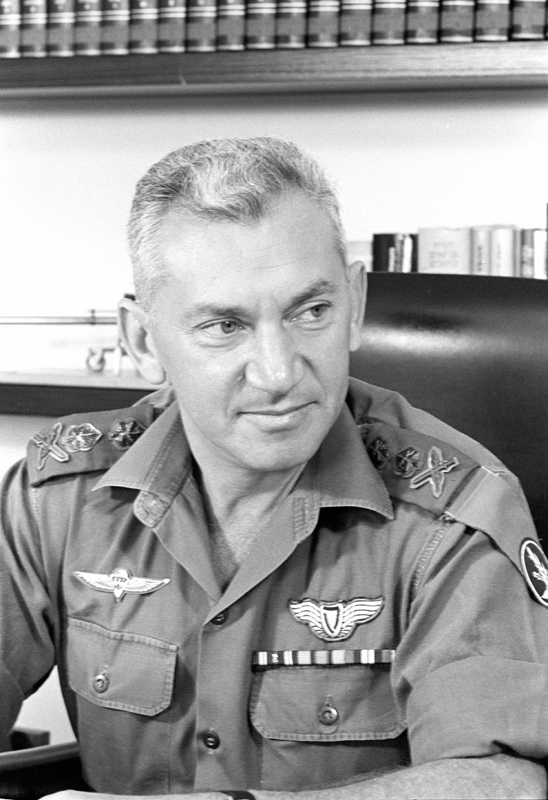
- Haim "Kidoni" Bar-Lev

Ministerial roles
- 1972–1977: Minister of Trade & Industry
- 1974: Minister of Development
- 1984–1990: Minister of Police

Faction represented in the Knesset
- 1977–1991: Alignment
- 1991–1992: Labor Party

Military roles
- 1973: Head of Southern Command
- 1967–1968: Deputy Chief of Staff
- 1968–1972: Chief of General Staff

Personal details
- Born: 16 November 1924 Vienna, Austria
- Died: 7 May 1994 (aged 69) Tel Aviv, Israel
- Children: Omer
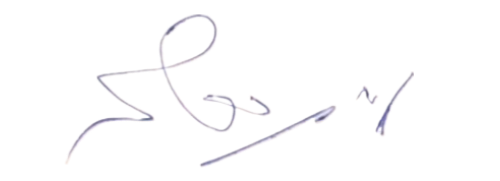
- Signature

Military service
- Allegiance: Israel
- Branch/service: Israel Defense Forces
- Years of service: 1942–73
- Rank: Rav aluf (Lieutenant general)
- Commands: Chief of General Staff; Southern Command
- Battles/wars: Jewish insurgency in Mandatory Palestine; 1948 Arab–Israeli War; Suez Crisis; Six-Day War; War of Attrition; Yom Kippur War

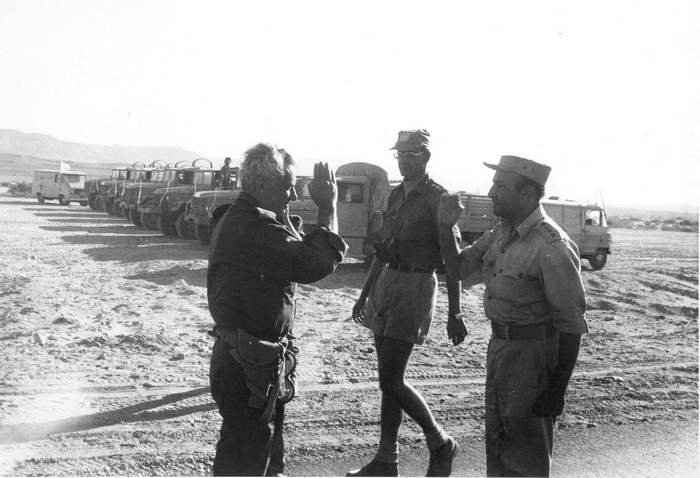
24 October 1973: Following the Yom Kippur War, a UN-arranged meeting between Bar-Lev and an Egyptian general in Sinai

Haim "Kidoni" Bar-Lev (Hebrew: חיים בר־לב; 16 November 1924 – 7 May 1994) was a military officer during Israel's pre-state and early statehood eras and later a government minister.

== Biography ==
Born Haim Brotzlewsky in Vienna to Moshe and Dwora Brotzlewsky (née Wilkonsky), his family moved to Zagreb when he was 4 years old, and he was raised there. His father became one of the textile magnates of interwar Yugoslavia. The young Haim joined his local chapter of HaShomer HaTzair. Bar-Lev made aliyah to Mandate Palestine in 1939. The rest of his family was able to emigrate to Palestine two years later. From 1942 through 1948, Bar-Lev served in various Jewish military units, such as the Palmach. He became both a pilot and a parachutist, which would later serve him in developing both of these military branches in the young Israel Defense Forces.

In 1946, Bar-Lev blew up the Allenby Bridge near Jericho to prevent Arab militiamen in Trans-Jordan from entering Jewish towns west of the Jordan River. During the 1948 Arab–Israeli War, Bar-Lev was the commander of the Eighth Battalion (Mechanized) in the Negev Brigade, which fought in the southern part of the country and the Sinai.

During the 1956 Suez Crisis he commanded the 27th Armored Brigade, which captured the Gaza Strip before turning southwest and reaching the Suez Canal. By 1964 he became of Director of Operations within the Israel Defense Forces (IDF).

During the June 1967 Six-Day War he served as the Deputy Chief of Staff in the IDF. Israeli Chief of Staff General Chaim Bar-Lev initiated the construction of defensive structures along the Canal, despite advice from several seasoned commanders. However, Israeli commanders did not prioritize determining whether the 'Bar-Lev Line' served as merely a 'trip-wire', as later asserted, or constituted a comprehensive defensive barrier.

Between 1968 and 1971, Bar-Lev served as IDF's Chief of General Staff, which made him the highest-ranking military officer.

During the October 1973 Yom Kippur War, although retired from the IDF and serving as the Minister of Trade and Industry, he was recalled by Prime Minister Golda Meir back into military service to replace Shmuel "Gorodish" Gonen as chief of the Southern Command, which defended the Sinai Peninsula. Bar-Lev played a pivotal role in the war. Before his appointment the Southern front was in disarray to the point of near total collapse and Gonen was proving unable to effectively control the situation. Bar-Lev immediately took charge and worked towards stabilizing the front. His political and negotiating skills also proved instrumental in controlling his field generals who were feuding amongst themselves since each had their own notions, sometimes competing ones, regarding how the war in the South should be carried out. The effect that Bar-Lev's arrival had on the chaotic Southern command headquarters was described by Gonen's deputy, Uri Ben-Ari, in testimony to the Israeli military's historical department:

Bar-Lev brought calmness on all of us. Finally there was a feeling that we had a real commander in charge. This feeling spread between us and later also in the battlefield radios like fire. Bar-Lev also managed to calm Gorodish down. Prior to his arrival, general staff meetings were one loud shout out of Gorodish's mouth. Bar Lev instituted orderly working routines. No one challenged his authority. The country owes much to him. "Dvelah" went back to being a real war-room, a compartmentalized one. No one [who did not belong there] was allowed entry. Serenity descended on the war room. The general staff officers switched to carrying out their tasks in well organized shifts. Even Arik [Ariel Sharon]'s tone of voice changed when Bar Lev arrived.

=== Political career ===
Bar-Lev remained Minister of Trade and Industry until the Alignment government was defeated and replaced by the Likud under the leadership of Menachem Begin following the 1977 elections, in which Bar-Lev was elected to the Knesset for the first time. Between 1977 and 1984 he served as General Secretary of the Labor Party, the largest faction in the Alignment. When the Alignment joined the national unity governments that held office between 1984 and 1990, Bar-Lev served as Minister of Police and as a member of the "inner cabinet". He retired from the Knesset at the time of the 1992 elections, and was appointed ambassador to Russia, serving until 1994.

He died in Tel Aviv on 7 May 1994.

His son Omer Bar-Lev is an Israeli politician member of the Labor Party.

== See also ==
- List of Israel's Chiefs of the General Staff
