= Ahmed Ali al-Mwawi =

Egyptian general

Ahmed Abdullah Ali al-Mawawi Bey

General Commander of the Egyptian expeditionary force during 1948 Arab–Israeli War
- In office May 12, 1948 – October 20, 1948
- Monarch: Farouk I
- Prime Minister: Mahmoud an-Nukrashi Pasha

Personal details
- Born: 1897 Sohag, Khedivate of Egypt
- Died: 1979 (aged 81–82) Egypt

Military service
- Allegiance: Kingdom of Egypt
- Branch/service: Army
- Years of service: 1916–1948
- Rank: General
- Commands: Commander of the 4th Infantry Brigade; Commander of the Infantry Corps; General Commander of the Egyptian Expeditionary force in Palestine
- Battles/wars: 1948 Arab–Israeli War: Battle of Yad Mordechai; Battle of Nitzanim; Operation Pleshet; Battles of Negba; Operation Death to the Invader; Operation GYS
- Awards: Palestine War Merit

Ahmed Abdullah Al-Mwawi (1897–1979), also Mawawi or Muwawi, was an Egyptian major general. He served as the General Commander of the Egyptian expeditionary force during 1948 Arab–Israeli War.

== Personal life ==
He was born in Sohag in 1897. He was married and had four children.

== Military career ==
- Mwawi graduated from the Military Academy in 1916.
- He was appointed at the rank of major as head of the training department of Military Operations.
- He was promoted to the rank of brigadier in 1945, he became the commander of the 4th Infantry Brigade.
- In 1947 he was appointed Commander of the Infantry Corps.
- On May 12, 1948, he was appointed commander of the Egyptian Army in Sinai.

== Role in 1948 war ==
=== Warning discussion ===
On the evening of Tuesday, May 11, 1948, al-Mwawi attended a secret meeting of the Egyptian parliament to discuss the declaration of war. Before the voting of the parliament, he warned that the Egyptian Army was not prepared, opining that there would be little real fighting. The battle plan was unclear and war aims were vague, making al-Mwawi uncertain of his objectives. On May 15 he led the Egyptian Expeditionary Forces into Palestine. The Egyptians numbered between 7,000 and 10,000 troops, divided into two brigades.

The Egyptian Expeditionary Forces comprised the 1st Infantry Battalion (numbering 700–750), the 6th Infantry Battalion (700–750), the 9th Infantry Battalion (700–750), an armoured reconnaissance battalion (35 armoured vehicles), a light tank battalion (seven tanks), three 25 pound cannon batteries (24 cannons), one 18 pound cannon battery (eight cannons) and one six pound anti-tank cannon battery (eight cannons).

With the intensification of clashes in Palestine he moved his headquarters to el-Arish where he was stationed along with an infantry force.

=== War efforts ===
On May 14, Mwawi was promoted by Royal decree to the rank of major general and appointed commander of the southern sector of the Palestine theater of the Egyptian army operations. He commanded an expeditionary force of about 10,000 men consisting of five infantry battalions, an armored battalion with British Mark VI and Matilda tanks, a battalion of sixteen 25-pounder guns, a battalion of eight 6-pounder guns and a medium machine-gun battalion with supporting troops.

=== Alarming report ===
He sent a report to Cairo headquarters, on July 18, 1948, during the second truce of the 1948 Arab–Israeli War, describing the shortages in armaments and supplies. He also reported that the Arab forces were divided by mistrust.

=== Relief from command ===
On October 20, King Farouk I relieved al-Mwawi of his command.

== Legacy ==
A village was named after him near Kafr el-Dawwar, Buhayrah, Egypt.
