= Operation Hisul =

1948 Arab–Israeli War battle

- Part of the 1948 Arab–Israeli War of the 1948 Palestine war
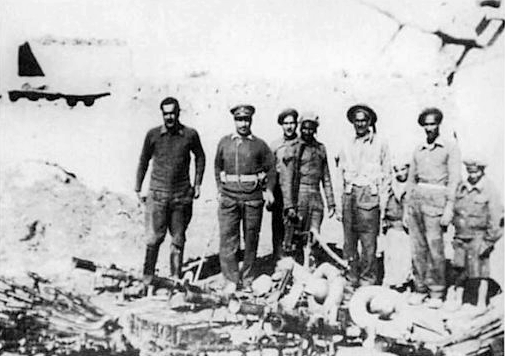
- Gamal Abdel Nasser in al-Faluja
Date	27–28 December 1948
Location	al-Faluja, Mandatory Palestine
Result	Egyptian victory

Belligerents
Israel	Egypt

Commanders and leaders
Benz Friedan	Sayed Taha

Casualties and losses
90 killed 5 captured	Equal or less than the Israeli

Operation Hisul (Hebrew: חיסול מבצע, Mivtza Hisul, lit. Operation Liquidation) was a failed Israeli attempt to dissolve the Egyptian pocket of al-Faluja on the night of 28 December during Operation Horev. The operation was the second-worst loss suffered by the Israel Defense Forces (IDF) in a single engagement behind the Kfar Etzion massacre in May up until that point.

== Background ==
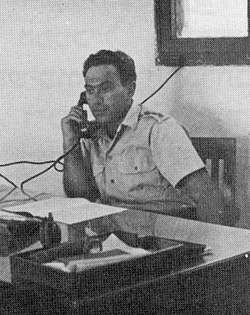
Ben Friedan, commander of the Alexandroni Brigade

After being encircled by Israeli Defense Forces in Operation Yoav, the Egyptian pocket at al-Faluja—estimated to be 4,000 men—was a source of great anxiety for the Egyptians, sitting astride a main crossroads. The pocket necessitated the need for large encircling forces in the event the Egyptians mounted a breakout from, or a break-in into, the pocket. The IDF sought the "liquidation of the pocket", according to the operational order, and the General Staff allocated the Alexandroni Brigade, an additional infantry battalion, the 152nd, and a number of artillery and heavy mortar batteries, for the task. Operation Horev was seen as a "natural environment” for the action

== The battle ==
After repeated bombing raids during 26–27 December 1948, two battalions—the 33rd and 35th—went in on the night of 27 December and continued into the following day. At 22:00 p.m. on 27 December, the IDF began to move to assessment points in darkness. The IDF postponed the attack for 11:30 p.m. due to torrential rains that week.

Company A of the 35th Battalion, whose task was to capture the checkpoint and set up a blockade on the road, encountered well-ranged rocket artillery and machine gun fire, which resulted in the loss of 14 men and left 20 men wounded. Despite the loss suffered by Company A, the Alexandroni Brigade pressed on the attack.

At approximately 1:00 a.m., the IDF successfully took a position known to the Egyptians as the "Hill of the Three Trees" in a close quarter battle; the Sudanese company defending it retreated to Iraq al-Manshiyya, although they inflicted considerable casualties on IDF troops. Meanwhile, the 33rd Battalion succeeded in entering and occupying most of Iraq al-Manshiyya despite Egyptian resistance and established a command post there. Israeli soldiers, who were "unable to control themselves," according to one IDF report, subsequently killed surrendering Egyptian and Sudanese troops. According to Israeli historian Benny Morris, this may have accounted for the stronger resistance offered by the Egyptian troops on the nearby Tel Erani which Company C failed to take.

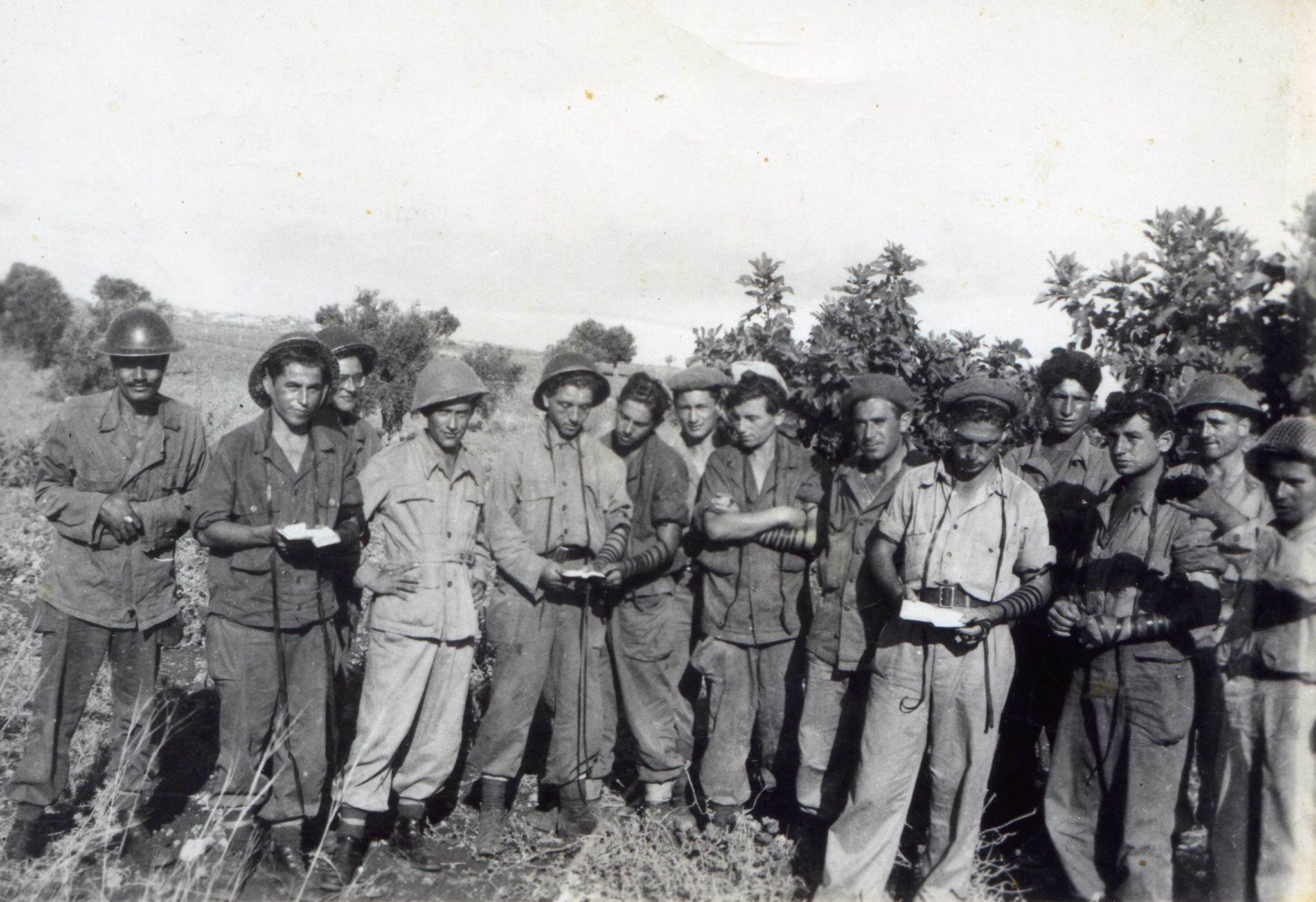
Troops from the Alexandroni brigade

Facing a dire situation, chief of staff of the 6th Battalion Gamal Abdel Nasser requested help from the command at al-Faluja several times; notably, after the failed counterattack he launched to retake the Hill of the Three Trees had failed. Amid the confusion, officer Wahid Goda Ramadan volunteered to go Iraq al-Manshiyya with a mechanized force. Commander Sayed Taha approved it as the Egyptian forces recovered. An armored convoy of twelve was organized in al-Faluja with an infantry company.

At 7:00 a.m., the convoy left for al-Manshiyya. Because the blockade on the bridge failed, the column broke through to the rear of the Israeli forces fighting in al-Manshiyya Iraq. (Note: Some scholars believe that the IDF may have let the convoy through.) The Egyptian reinforcements managed to enter the village and joined the Egyptians who remained there. The 35th Battalion's headquarters lost contact with Company C and by 8:30 a.m., three armored carriers equipped with three machine guns. An attempt was made by the IDF to infiltrate reserve forces from the 32nd Battalion and the jeep company was ordered to break into the village. In spite of this, all attempts to help were unsuccessful.

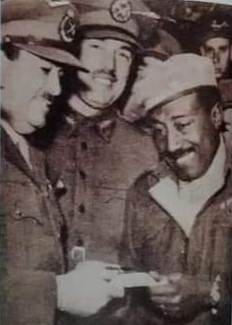
Sayed Taha (right) led the Egyptian front

In light of the dire situation that prevailed, the General issued a withdrawal order. At 9:30 a.m., the troops began to fold as they carried their casualties. The commander of Company C reported that he would not withdraw since the number of his casualties was large and he could not get them out of the siege. Among those leaving were only remnants of Company C with some of the wounded. The Egyptians climbed the high walls that surrounded the courtyard and killed all the soldiers in the courtyard, including the company commander and his deputy. The only ones who managed to get out were an officer with eight wounded fighters, as well as the company commander who had been sent earlier to bring food and ammunition. Company B retreated in disorder through the formation of Company A, which still managed to maintain the breach. The remnants of Companies A and B managed to withdraw by 10:30 a.m.; by 11:00 a.m., an infantry platoon led by Major Abdel Satar Moshal retook the Hill of the Three Trees.

== Aftermath ==
The IDF lost 90 men; and 5 captured Egyptian losses are estimated be equal or less than that number. (Note: According to David Ben-Gurion, "From the Egyptian perspective, Faluja is their Tobruk, and their people are holding out with great courage." Thus, prisoners of war may be included in this number.) This would be the last IDF effort against the pocket as it would be evacuated later after the armistice agreement.
