= Negev Brigade =

Reserve infantry brigade of the Israel Defense Forces

- חטיבת הנגב
- Negev Brigade insignia, based on the Palmach symbol
- Active: 1948–present
- Country: Israel
- Allegiance: Israel Defense Forces
- Branch: Israeli Ground Forces
- Size: Brigade
- Part of: 252nd Division
- Engagements: 1948 Arab–Israeli War: Operation Yoav; Six Day War: Battle of Abu-Ageila (1967)

Commanders
- Current commander: Aluf Mishne Hebrew Elbaz

The Negev Brigade (Hebrew: חטיבת הנגב, Hativat HaNegev), originally the 12th Brigade is an Israeli reserve infantry brigade under the Sinai Division, that originally served in the 1948 Arab-Israeli war.

== History ==
=== Founding and organization ===
Yitzak Rabin in the background, with Nachum Sarig on the right

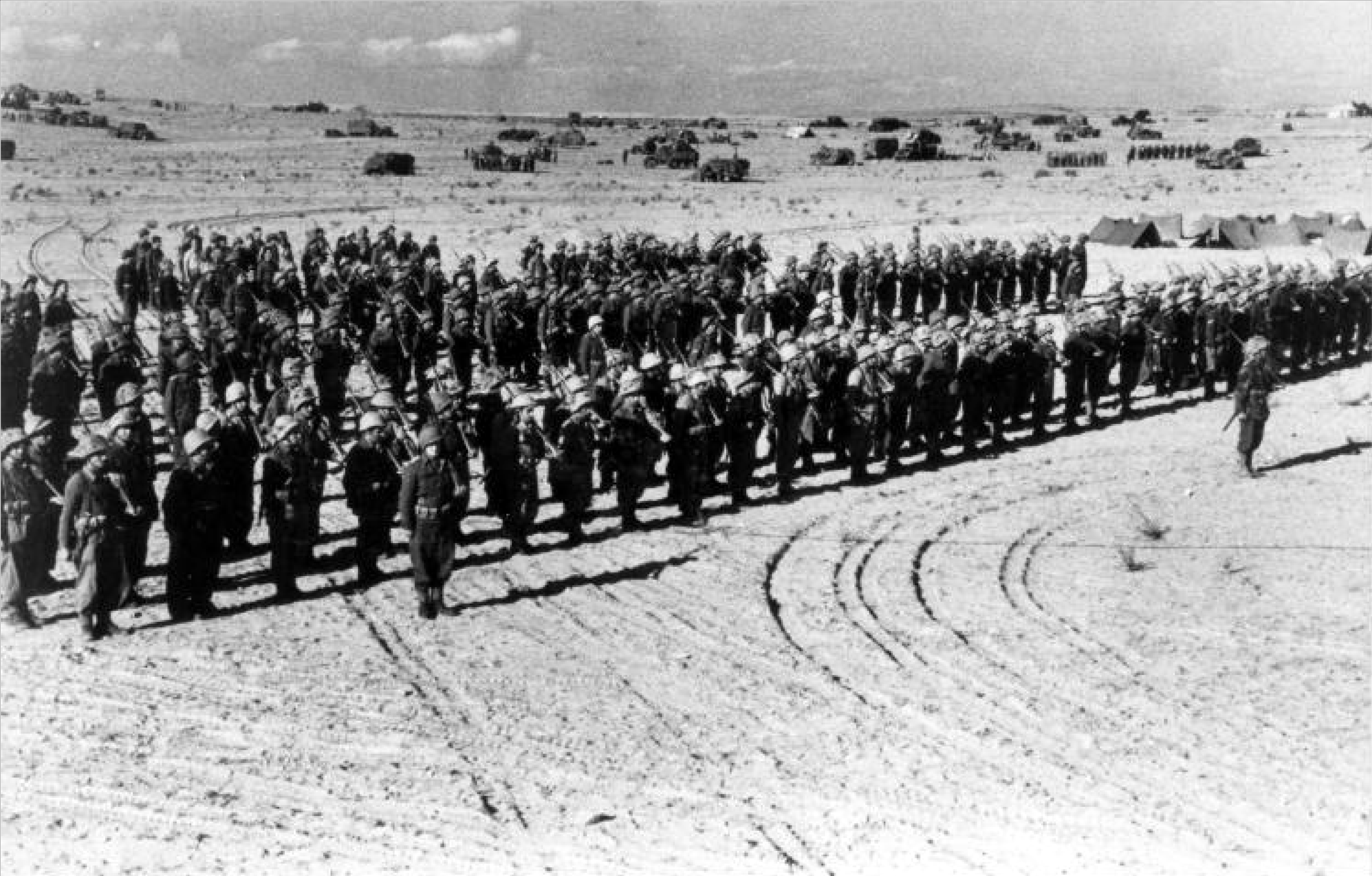
The Negev Brigade parading prior to Operation Horev

The brigade was founded in March 1948 with two battalions, the 2nd and 8th. The 7th Battalion was created in April, with the 9th Battalion being the last of the four. Yisrael Galili, the Haganah Chief of Staff, and Yigal Allon, the Palmach commander, chose Nachum Sarig to command the brigade in December 1947. The residents of the Negev and David Ben-Gurion appointed Shaul Avigur instead, without Sarig's knowledge. After Avigur toured the Negev, he told Ben-Gurion that he would not be able to command the brigade, citing deteriorating health, and praised Sarig.

It was commanded by Nahum "Sergei" Sarig, which is why it was also called Sergei Brigade. It consisted of four Palmach battalions. The Negev Brigade participated in many operations in the Negev Desert, including Operation Yoav in the latter part of the war. Sarig decided to divide the Negev into two sectors, divided by the Beersheba–Gaza road, later Highway 25. Yigal Allon then named Haim Bar-Lev as the commander of the southern sector—the 8th Battalion.

The Palmach memorial website records the names of 312 of its members who died while in the Negev Brigade.

During the 1948 war, the Negev Brigade was involved in the defence of Negba, Kafr Daron, Be'erot Yitzhak and Nirim. In October 1948 the Brigade took part in the conquest of Beersheba. They were part of Operations Barak, Yoav, An Far, Horev, Uvda and Pleshet.

In the 1967 war, the Brigade fought in the battle of Abu Agelia.

In the 2023 Gaza war the unit saw action in Beit Hanoun, the unit was later deployed in the Rafah offensive.

== Units ==
- 12th Infantry Brigade "Negev" (Reserve)
  - 8114th Infantry Battalion
  - 9208th Infantry Battalion
  - 9217th Infantry Battalion
  - (6863rd) Reconnaissance Battalion
  - 5512th Logistic Battalion
  - 523rd Signal Company

== Memorialization ==
- Outside Be'er Sheva stands Dani Karavan's sculpture "Monument to the Negev Brigade".

== Image gallery ==
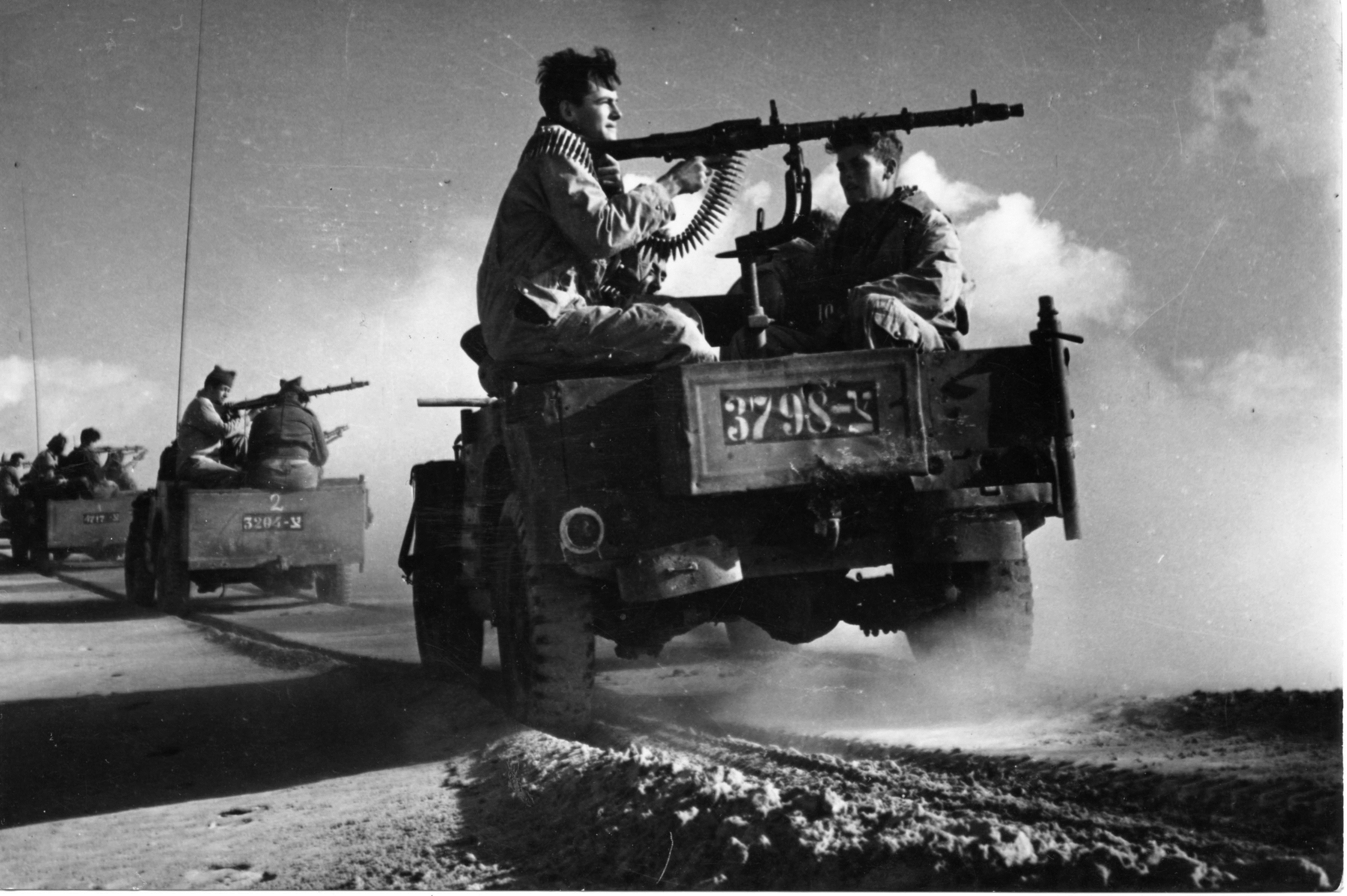
The Negev Brigade's raid on Bir Hama Airport during Operation Horev

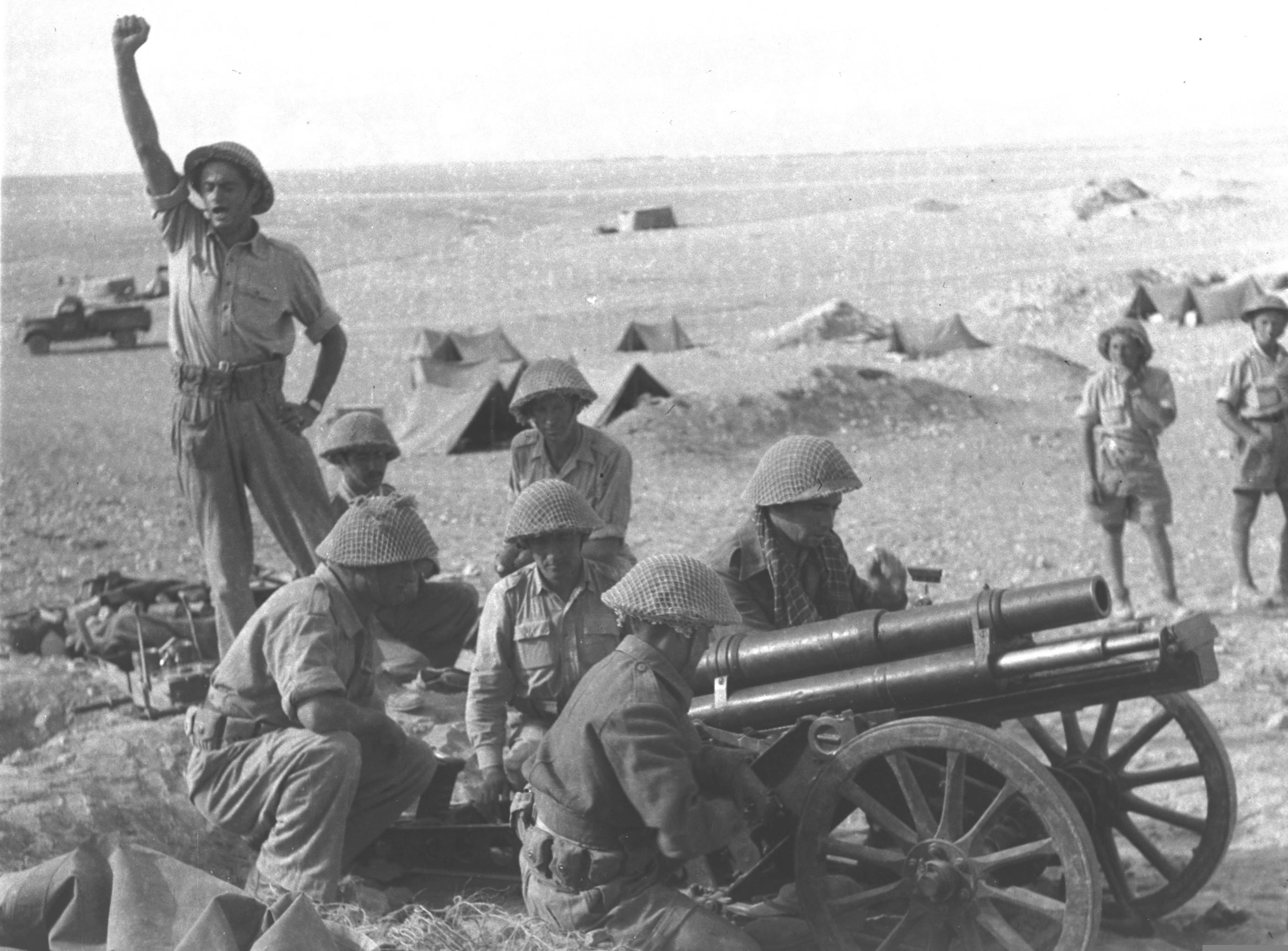
A Negev Brigade artillery unit

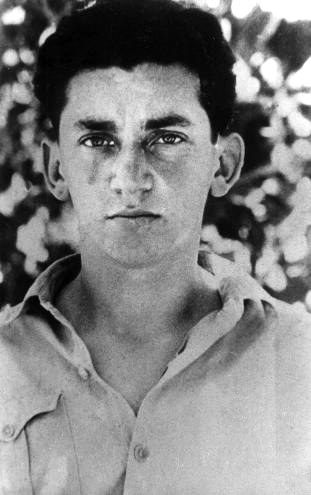
Haim Bar Lev, as Commander of the 8th Battalion of the 12th Negev Brigade (1948)

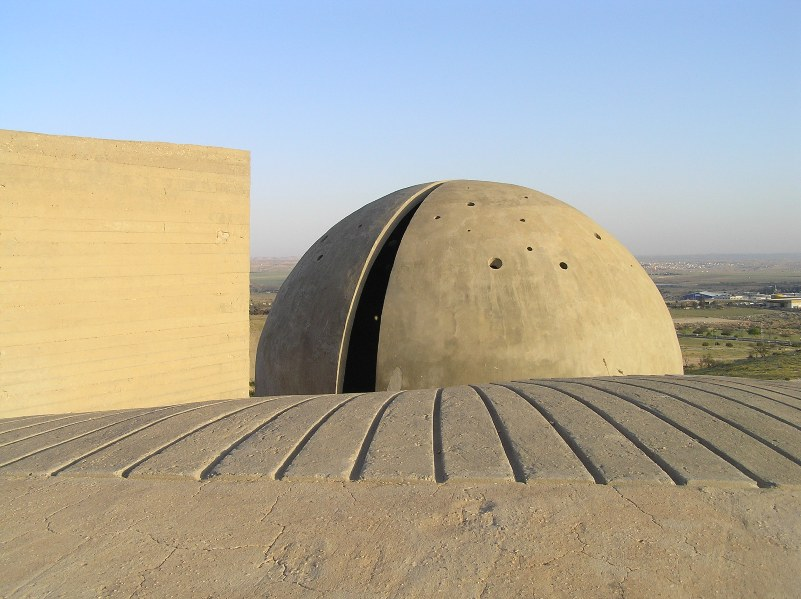
The Negev Brigade Memorial Dome

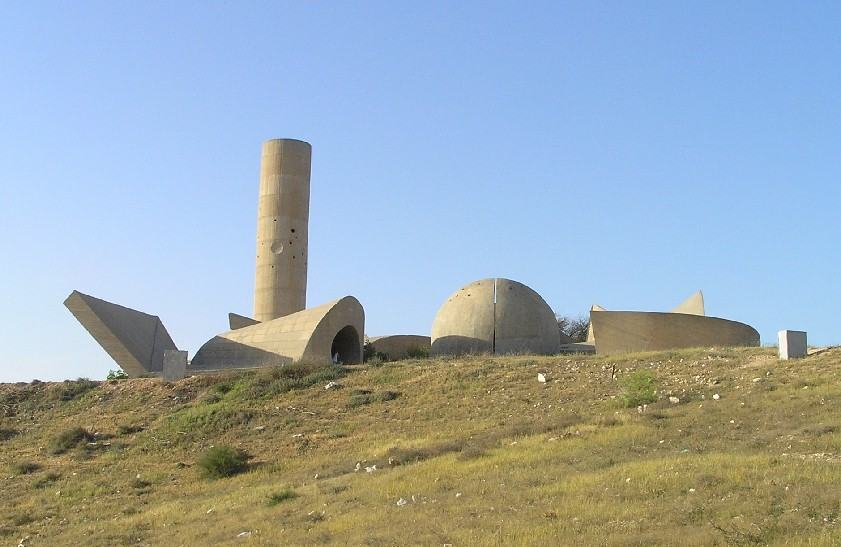
The Negev Brigade Memorial
