= Battles of Kfar Darom =

Military battles between Haganah and Arab forces

- Part of 1948 Arab–Israeli War
Date	7 December 1947 – 9 July 1948
Location	Kfar Darom, Mandatory Palestine 31°24′05″N 34°21′36″E
Result	Egyptian victory; Evacuation following Egyptian siege

Belligerents
(Israel) Haganah	(Kingdom of Egypt) Egypt; Muslim Brotherhood

Strength
30 troops	Unknown

Casualties and losses
May 11 battle: 4 killed 4 wounded	11 May battle: 70 killed 15 May battle: 70 killed 50 wounded 1 tank damaged
- Location within Mandatory Palestine

The Battles of Kfar Darom refer to a number of military engagements in 1947–1948 between the Jewish Haganah and various Arab forces in the 1948 Arab–Israeli War, in the southern kibbutz Kfar Darom. The most notable battles were fought on May 13–15, 1948, between the Palmach and the Egyptian army, including Muslim Brotherhood units. The kibbutz was defended by about 30 Israelis and held out against numerous attacks.

While Egyptian assaults were unsuccessful, their siege led to the evacuation of the kibbutz by its members on July 8, 1948, after resupply attempts through the ground and air by the Israeli Negev Brigade and air force were insufficient or failed entirely. The Egyptian army stormed it the next day only to find it empty.

== Background ==
Kfar Darom was originally a fruit orchard established in 1930 by the citrus grower Tuvia Miller, located far from the rest of the Jewish population of the British Mandate of Palestine. It was destroyed in the 1936–1939 Arab revolt in Palestine. The village was re-established as part of the 11 points in the Negev plan, a response to the Morrison–Grady Plan for the partition of Palestine. On October 6, 1946, new olim left Be'erot Yitzhak to create Kfar Darom, Be'eri and Tkuma. Kfar Darom was strategically located on the coastal road that the Egyptians would later use as their main advance and supply route.

== 1947–1948 Palestine War ==
While all Jewish villages in the Negev were isolated to some degree and therefore comparatively easy targets, during the 1947–1948 war in mandatory Palestine, Kfar Darom bore the brunt of the Arab attacks. First shots were fired at the village on December 7, 1947. By this time the village was under siege and military effort was required to get supplies through. The situation deteriorated and by April 1948, Kfar Darom was completely surrounded by Arab forces.

The first significant Arab attempt to capture Kfar Darom was on March 23, 1948, when 18 separate attacks were repelled by the local residents. Shots were again heard on April 8. On April 10, a Muslim Brotherhood's First Battalion under Husni al-Musawi staged an attack on the village, but was defeated with dozens of casualties.

The next attempt was made by the Brotherhood on May 10 under Lieutenant Colonel (Bikbashi) Ahmad al-Aziz. Aziz sent reconnaissance patrols on May 10, and on the next day, assaulted the village. He hoped that a one-hour artillery barrage would kill or wound most of the defenders, but it was mostly off-target and failed to destroy any building. Three infantry and armoured thrusts were repelled, as they were allowed to come close to the village fence unmolested, and concentrated fire was opened at them when they did, causing confusion. The sappers who were meant to breach the fence were all killed or wounded and the force could not advance further and retreated, leaving 70 dead. In Kfar Darom, four were killed and four wounded, leaving a total of 25 able to fight.

== Battles of May 13–15 ==
Battles were renewed on the night of May 12, when a Muslim Brotherhood infantry contingent breached the eastern fence of Kfar Darom. They entered into a minefield and withdrew. A lone tank broke through the gate but had to stop at a communications trench. It was torched with Molotov cocktails and withdrew as well. At this point the kibbutz was defended by 30 members, of them 20 Palmach soldiers from the Negev Brigade.

After two reinforcement attempts before Egyptian intervention failed (one of them because of a "rebellion" by Palmach squad commanders who refused to lead new recruits), the Negev Brigade planned a major breakthrough with a reinforced company with several armored vehicles. The plan was to capture the Bedouin locality Khirbat Ma'in and get a convoy through to Kfar Darom during the night of May 14–15. The attack was delayed and Khirbat Ma'in was only taken at dawn. The vehicles proceeded in daylight to Kfar Darom, but got bogged down in sand 2 kilometres (1.2 mi) away from the village, and came under fire from Muslim Brotherhood forces. All vehicles were abandoned except one, which managed to reach Kfar Darom fully intact. Many of the troops from the abandoned vehicles made it to Kfar Darom on foot, but carried 39 wounded, which only made the fighting more difficult for the besieged. Food and water rations now had to be divided among more people.

The Egyptian regular army staged its attack on the morning of May 15. Forces from the 1st Battalion including three tanks, six armored vehicles, 10 other vehicles and an infantry contingent attacked Kfar Darom from the Deir al-Balah railway station in the northwest. They were met with anti-tank fire and retreated after one tank was hit. The Egyptian infantry pushed on, but was repelled and failed to breached the perimeter. The Egyptian losses amounted to 70 killed and 50 wounded. All the while, Egyptian aircraft made bombing runs on the village. After the ground troops reorganized, they made a final thrust to rescue to wounded left in the field, and a heavy artillery barrage on the village followed.

== Siege and evacuation ==
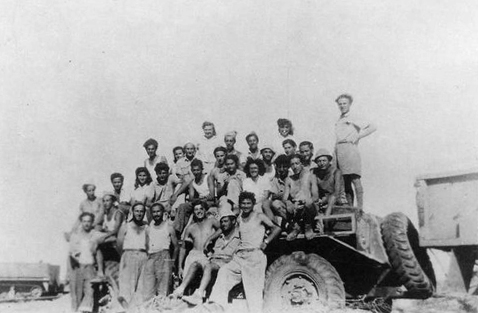
Residents of Kfar Darom during the war

By the first truce of the war on June 11, Kfar Darom was completely surrounded and under siege by Egyptian forces. Numerous attempts were made before and during the truce, including aerial drops, to deliver food and supplies to the village. The United Nations ceasefire observers did not intervene, and Egypt prevented the besieged kibbutz from receiving aid, including by shelling the areas where aerial drops landed, so that they could not be picked up. One convoy from the Negev Brigade managed to enter the village, but were subjected to Egyptian fire when trying to get back. After 8 days, they finally managed to take a few wounded and make it back to the Israeli lines.

In light of the situation, the Negev Brigade requested permission to evacuate Kfar Darom. Although they would be sacrificing a strategic asset (a position that overlooked the coastal road, which was Egypt's main supply route) and deviating from the principle prevalent at that time in Israel that no settlement would be evacuated, the brigade wished to consolidate its positions, and Kfar Darom was a major burden. The General Staff agreed, and an order was given to abandon the village on July 8. It was evacuated under cover of darkness with all the weapons possible to carry, as well as the two Torah scrolls; other supplies were destroyed. Egypt's army attacked on July 9 with infantry, armor and artillery, but were surprised to find the village deserted.

== Reactions and aftermath ==
The initial stand of Kfar Darom on May 13–15 lifted the morale of all Israeli forces, as it was considered the first successful Jewish stand against the Arab standing armies (Gush Etzion had fallen to the Transjordanian Arab Legion several days earlier).

The land of Kfar Darom remained under Egyptian control following the 1949 Armistice Agreements, and became part of the Gaza Strip. Some of the kibbutz members helped found Bnei Darom in 1949, near today's Ashdod. The Gaza Strip was captured by Israel in the 1967 Six-Day War, and in 1970, a Nahal settlement was built next to the old Kfar Darom. It was civilianized in October 1989. On August 18, 2005, Kfar Darom was evacuated as part of Israel's unilateral disengagement plan.
