= Yad Mordechai =

Kibbutz in Southern Israel

Yad Mordechai: יַד מָרְדְּכַי (Hebrew); ياد مردخاي (Arabic)
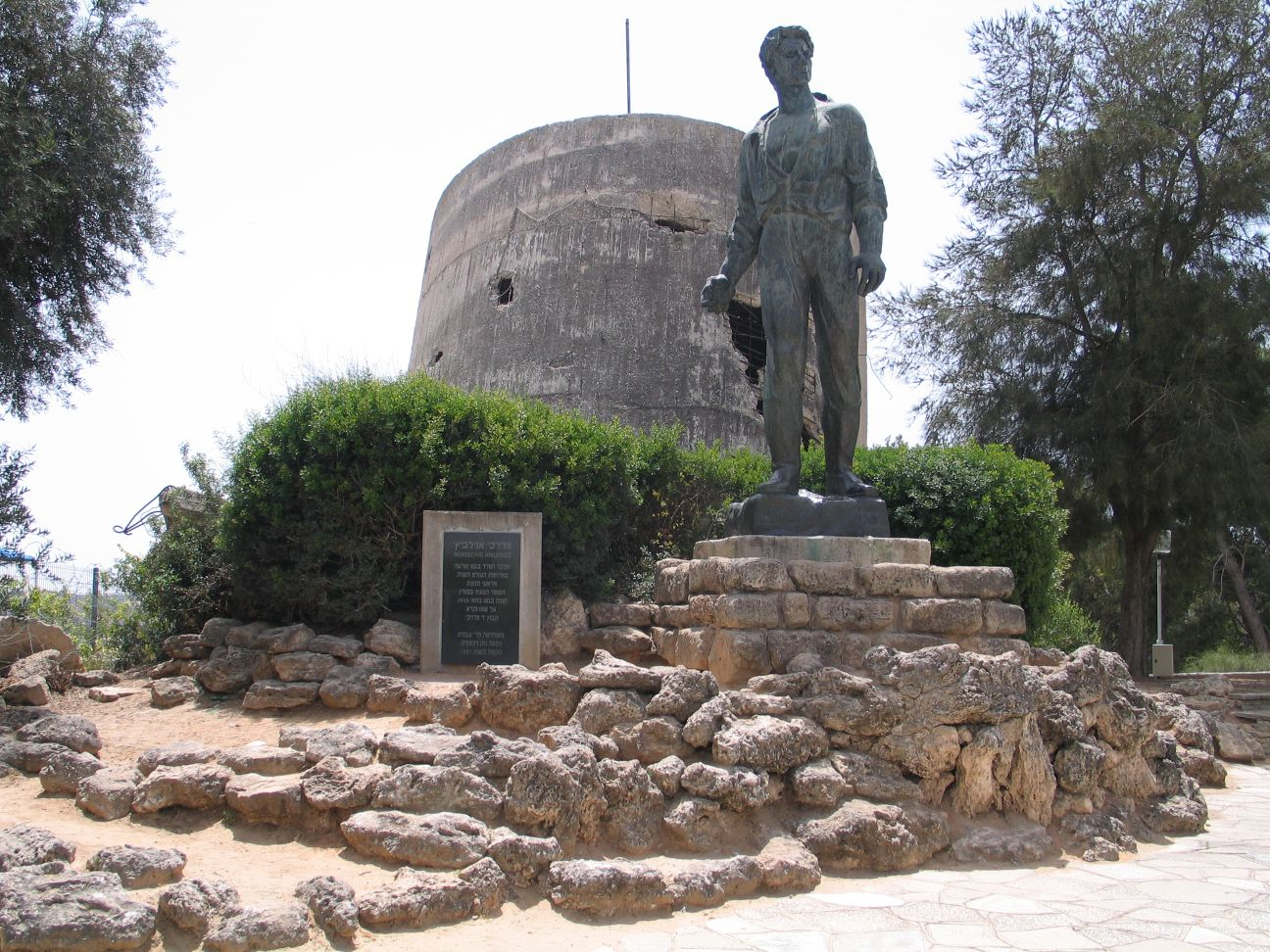
- Memorial to Mordechai Anielewicz next to the destroyed water tower at Yad Mordechai
- Etymology: Memorial of Mordechai
- Location within Ashkelon region of Israel Location within Israel
- Coordinates: 31°35′19″N 34°33′30″E
- Country: Israel
- District: Southern
- Subdistrict: Ashkelon
- Council: Hof Ashkelon
- Affiliation: Kibbutz Movement
- Founded: 1936 (as Mitzpe Yam); 1943 (as Yad Mordechai)
- Founder: Hashomer Hatzair members
- Population (2024): 1,014
- Website: www.yadmor.org.il

Yad Mordechai (Hebrew: יַד מָרְדְּכַי, lit. Memorial of Mordechai) is a kibbutz in Southern Israel. Located 10 km (6.2 mi) south of Ashkelon, it falls under the jurisdiction of Hof Ashkelon Regional Council. In 2024 it had a population of 1,014.

== History ==
The community was founded in 1936 by Hashomer Hatzair members from Poland and initially organized themselves in a kibbutz called Mitzpe Yam close to Netanya, which was also founded in 1936. However, the 14 dunams allocated to the kibbutz were insufficient to develop the kibbutz. As part of settlement in the Negev, the community moved to its site near Ashkelon in December 1943. The kibbutz was renamed in memorial to Mordechai Anielewicz, who was the first commander of the Jewish Fighting Organization in the Warsaw Ghetto Uprising. During the 1948 Arab–Israeli War, the kibbutz was attacked by Egypt in the Battle of Yad Mordechai.

Among the many Holocaust memorials in Israel, the "From Holocaust to Revival Museum" especially commemorates Jewish resistance against the Nazis as well as the 1948 Battle of Yad Mordechai. The statue of Anielewicz by Nathan Rapoport clutching a grenade, next to the water tower which was destroyed by the Egyptians in May 1948, is a noted symbol of the kibbutz.

After 1948, Yad Mordechai expanded onto land near the former Palestinian village of Hiribya, which was depopulated during the 1948 Arab–Israeli War.

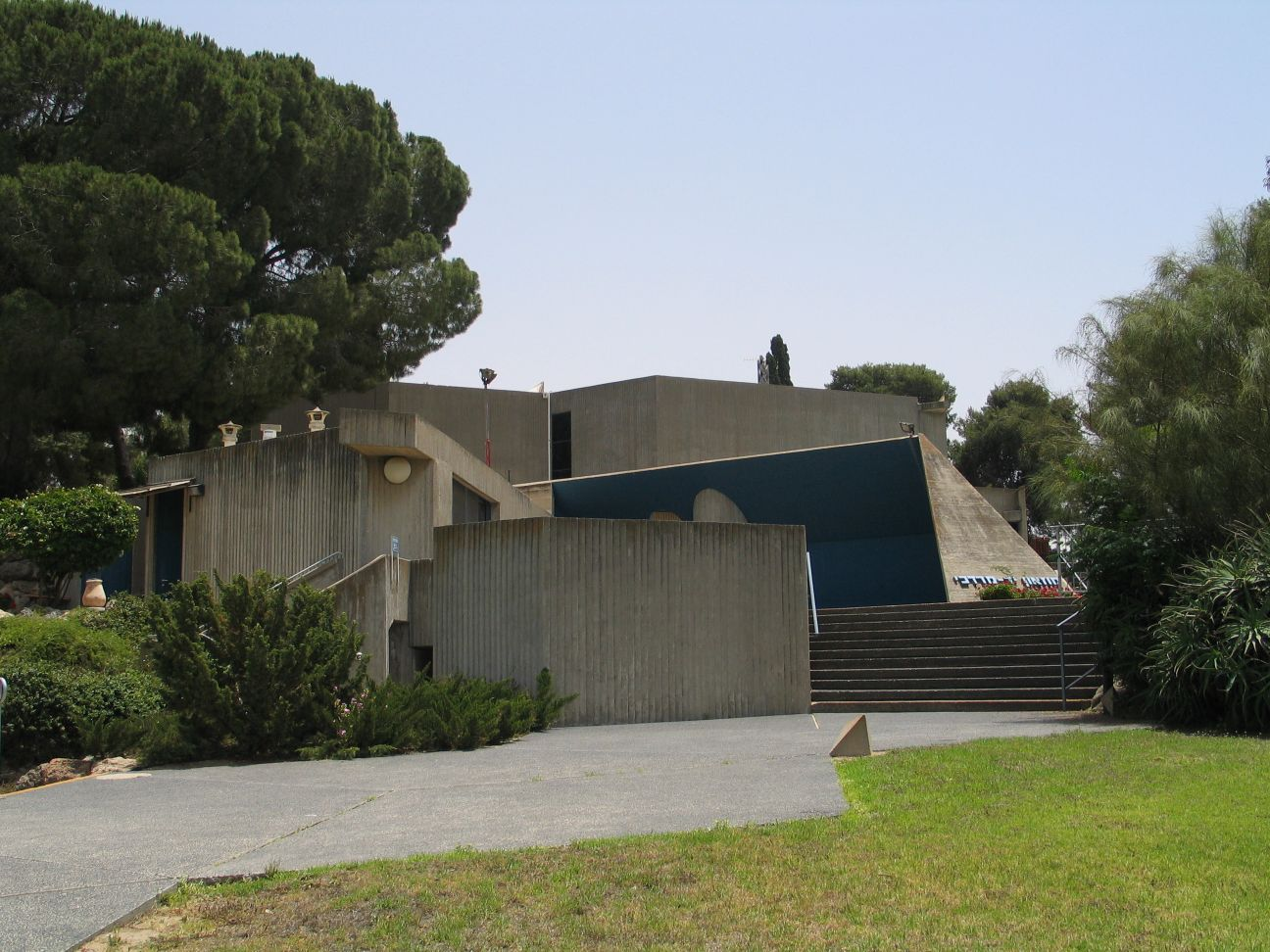
Yad Mordechai Museum

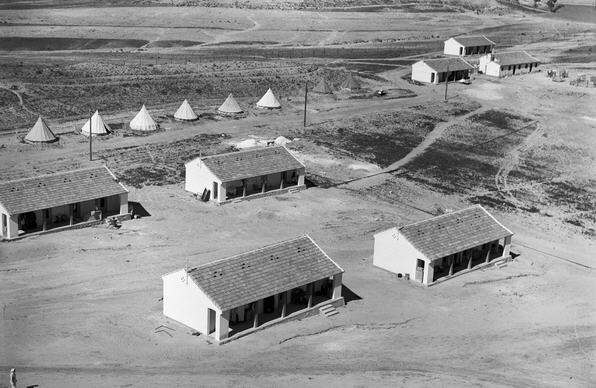
Yad Mordechai in 1941

During the October 7 attacks and massacres, in which more than 1,200 Israelis and foreigners were killed, Hamas gunmen attempted to infiltrate the kibbutz. The kibbutz security team repulsed the attack, emerging from the gate to engage the attackers and chasing them from the area. The kibbutz was also the target of several rocket attacks.

== Economy ==
The Yad Mordechai honey, jam and olive oil brands have been partnered with the Strauss Group, an Israeli food products manufacturer.

== Notable people ==
- Motty Perry (born 1949), Israeli academic
- Benny Gantz (born 1959), Israeli Politician
