= Battle of Yad Mordechai =

1948 battle in the Middle East

Coordinates: 31°35′19″N 34°33′30″E

- Part of 1948 Arab–Israeli War
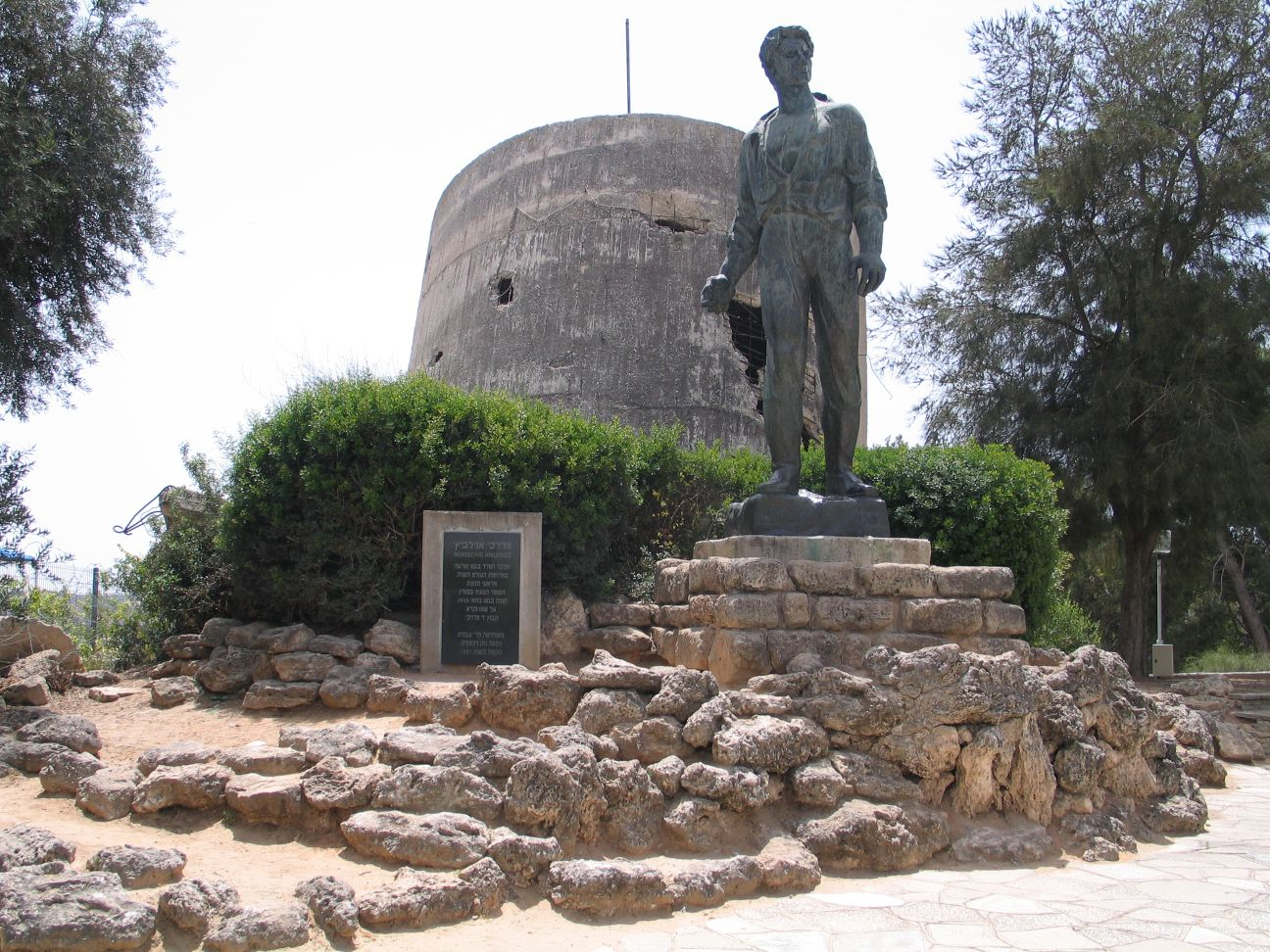
- Yad Mordechai memorial
Date	May 19–24, 1948
Location	Yad Mordechai, Israel
Result	Inconclusive; Six-month Egyptian control over the desolated commune and its surroundings; Successful Israeli delaying action

Belligerents
Israel	Egypt

Commanders and leaders
Unknown	Ahmad Ali al-Mwawi, Mohamed Kamel Rahmany (subcommander)

Strength
110 Kibbutz residents 20 Palmach (Haganah) fighters	2 infantry battalions 1 armored battalion 1 artillery battalion or 1 artillery regiment

Casualties and losses
26 killed 49 wounded	300–400 dead and wounded

The Battle of Yad Mordechai was fought between Egypt and Israel in the 1948 Arab-Israeli War, at the Israeli kibbutz of Yad Mordechai. The Egyptians attacked the settlement several times throughout May 19 and May 20, but failed to capture it. A final attack was launched on May 23, in which the Egyptians succeeded in capturing part of Yad Mordechai, following which the Israeli defenders withdrew. Yad Mordechai finally fell to the Egyptians on May 24 after hours of bombardment of the vacated kibbutz.

The kibbutz residents, aided by twenty Haganah fighters, imposed a five-day delay on the Egyptians. This gave Israeli forces time to prepare for the Egyptians' northward advance, and they succeeded in halting the Egyptian advance at Ad Halom less than a week later.

== Background ==
Yad Mordechai is a small kibbutz in southern Israel, founded in the 1930s and renamed in 1943 after Mordechaj Anielewicz, the leader of the Warsaw Ghetto Uprising. The kibbutz, perched on a hill, dominated the coastal road midway between Gaza and Majdal (today Ashkelon). The kibbutz was due to be incorporated into the Arab State according to the 1947 Partition Plan.

Egypt had dispatched an expeditionary force of around 10,000 men under the command of Major General Ahmad Ali al-Mwawi to Palestine in April 1948. Mwawi had separated his forces into two parts, one to march towards Jerusalem, the other to advance up the coast to Tel Aviv.

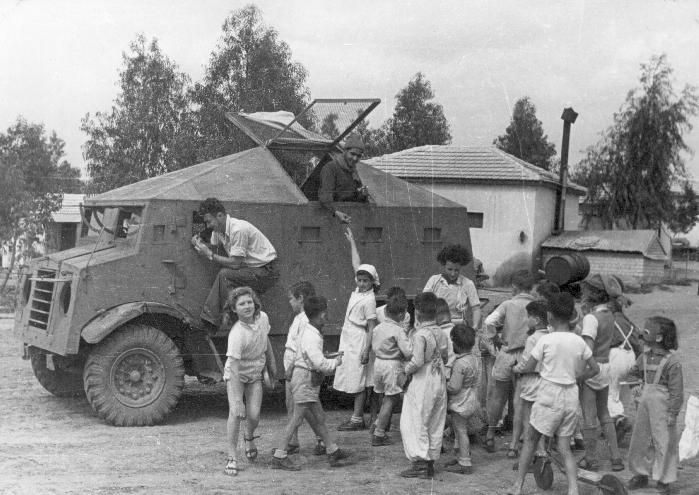
The "Yad Mordechai" Kibbutz children were evacuated by these improvised armored cars, only hours before the Egyptian attack on 19/5/1948

The Egyptians had bypassed several settlements along their route of advance, but on reaching Yad Mordechai on May 16, Mwawi decided that the settlement was too large and well defended to be simply bypassed. The Egyptians had the benefit of armor, artillery and air support. They also mustered 2,500 soldiers for the assault, far outnumbering the commune's 130 defenders.

An assembly of the kibbutz members decided on the evacuation of the women and children. On the night of May 18–19, a small Israeli armored column reached the kibbutz and extracted its 92 children. Left behind were 110 members (twenty of them women) and two squads of Palmachniks, equipped with light weapons, a medium machine gun and a PIAT hand-held anti-tank weapon.

== Battle ==
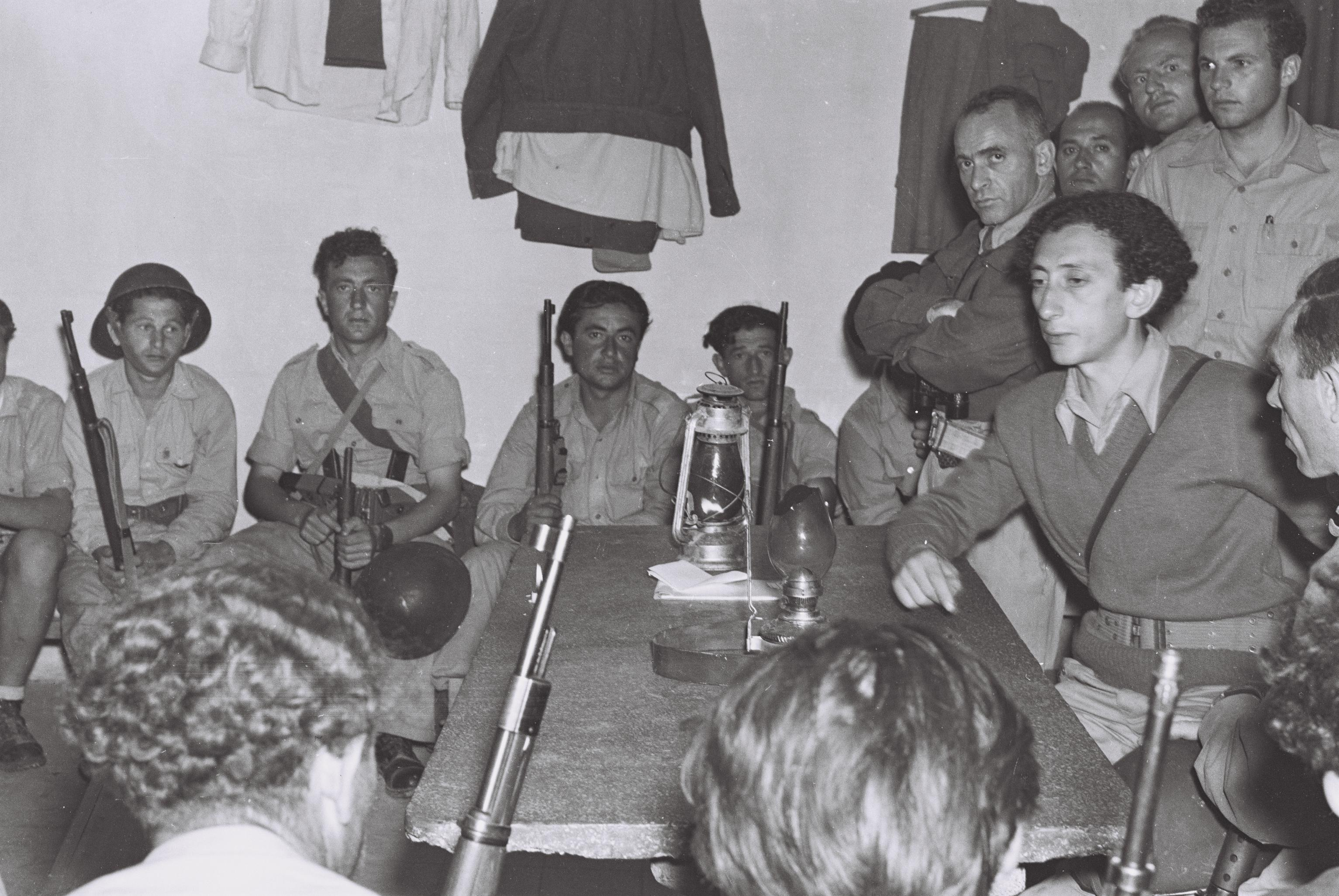
Kibbutz members at a military briefing in Yad Mordechai (Abba Kovner standing at right)

The Egyptians prepared for their assault for two days. Just after dawn on May 19, two battalions of infantry and one armored battalion attacked the village with artillery support. The Egyptians succeeded in breaching the perimeter fence, but after three hours of heavy fighting, were repulsed, leaving behind dozens of dead; the kibbutz suffered five dead and eleven wounded. Cairo radio announced prematurely that the settlement had fallen. The following day the Egyptians launched several more attacks (four according to Pollack, seven according to Morris), all of which were repulsed. Thirteen more Israelis died and twenty were wounded; dozens of Egyptians died as well. That night the Palmach sent in a platoon of reinforcements, including six deserters from the British military, with another PIAT and three machine guns. The Egyptians were hampered by the ineffectiveness of their artillery, and the difficulty in coordinating infantry and armor.

After the attacks on May 20, the Egyptians reorganized as Mwawi improved the coordination between his forces. The Egyptians spent May 21–22 shelling the kibbutz. The Egyptian air force prevented a relief column from reaching the site. The settlement's buildings were leveled and the defenders had become "inhabitants of caves and tunnels". By May 22, with dozens of wounded, the defenders were pleading for permission to withdraw. The final Egyptian attack on May 23 saw the armor providing much better support for the infantry, and the Egyptians occupied a part of the settlement. At night, the Israeli defenders, exhausted from the fighting and low on ammunition, withdrew from the settlement. The Israeli withdrawal was unknown to the Egyptians and the following day, they opened up with a four-hour artillery barrage on the now empty kibbutz. Following the barrage, they occupied the settlement, ending the battle.

== Aftermath ==
The Israeli delaying action at Yad Mordechai bought the newly established Israeli Defense Forces (IDF) time to organize a defensive line against the northward Egyptian drive toward Tel Aviv. The IDF used the time bought to transfer ammunition to the southern front and allow four new Avia S-199 fighter aircraft to join the IAF, which hitherto only had trainer and civilian aircraft. On November 5, in the days following Operation Yoav, Israeli forces retook the ruins of the kibbutz.
