= Battle of Rafah (1949) =

Military engagement between Israel and Egypt

- Part of the 1948 Arab–Israeli War
Date	3–8 January 1949
Location	Rafah, Former British Mandate of Palestine 31°17′19″N 34°15′07″E
Result	Inconclusive; 1949 Armistice Agreements

Belligerents
Israel	Egypt

Commanders and leaders
(Israel) David Ben-Gurion (Israel) David Elazar (Israel) Yigal Allon	(Egypt) Farouk I (Egypt) Ibrahim Abdel Hady
- Location within Mandatory Palestine

The Battle of Rafah was a military engagement between the Israel Defense Forces and the Egyptian Army in the final stage of the 1948 Arab–Israeli War. It was fought on January 3–8, 1949, just south of Rafah, today in the Gaza Strip. The battle was initiated by Israel as part of Operation Horev, on the backdrop of the Sinai battles just before. The Israelis were hoping to encircle all Egyptian forces in Palestine and drive them back to Egypt.

The Golani and Harel brigades were allocated for the attack, with the 8th Brigade serving as the operational reserve and the Negev Brigade staging diversions. While the Israelis had great trouble to advance in their individual assaults, eventually a battalion-sized force managed to take a position on the road from Rafah to the Sinai Peninsula, effectively surrounding the Egyptian expeditionary force. However, by this time the Egyptians agreed to negotiate armistice and the Israeli political echelon therefore ordered all troops back. The battle of Rafah was the last major combat operation in the war and was followed by the armistice agreements with Egypt.

== Background ==
The Egyptian regular army invaded Israel on May 15, 1948, following Israel's Declaration of Independence the day before. The main Egyptian column moved up the coastal plain in the following days, stopping at Isdud and establishing its headquarters in Majdal. After the creation of the Beit Hanoun wedge and other Israeli offensives in Operation Yoav, the Egyptian staff withdrew to Gaza and most of their forces concentrated in what is today the Gaza Strip.

On December 22, 1948, the Israelis launched Operation Horev, with the objective of expelling all Egyptian forces from Palestine. The Israeli Southern Command, under Yigal Allon, planned to encircle the Egyptians from the Sinai Peninsula, without the knowledge of the General Staff. Due to international pressure however, Allon's forces retreated from the Sinai and prepared instead to encircle the Egyptians by capturing the positions south of Rafah.

The Arab village Rafah was located on the border of Palestine and Egypt. To the south, there was a sand dune, followed by the coastal road and railway, followed by another sand dune, containing a Bedouin cemetery at the top (about 100 m above sea level). In the plateau between the dunes, the British built a large military base on both sides of the border in World War II.

== Battle ==
The Israel plan—the second stage of Operation Horev—was to take a number of position south of Rafah, just south of Rafah's military case. The Golani Brigade would attack from the east and take Hill 102 and the cemetery position, while the Harel Brigade would strike from the south and capture the junction on the Gaza–al-Arish road. The Negev and 8th brigades were also meat to assist in the operation as diversionary and reserve forces, respectively. The Egyptian forces in the area consisted of a reinforced brigade with 25 pounders and 20 M22 Locust tanks.

Golani forces from the 12th Battalion left kibbutz Nirim at 18:00 on January 3. A company was allocated to take each Hill 102 and the cemetery position. A special emphasis was placed on the transport of munitions and reinforcements, following the earlier debacle at the Battle of Hill 86. The attack on Hill 102 failed, as did two subsequent attacks. As the Golani forces approached the hill on the first attack, they were hit by friendly fire from the Israeli artillery, which also caused the Egyptians to notice them and fire their own artillery. The Golani company then retreated. The second assault, this time involving armored units, was repelled by the Egyptians who had reinforced the position with anti-tank weapons in the meantime.

The cemetery position had been captured by Israeli forces at 00:30 on January 4. The forces achieved complete surprise and were only discovered about 50 m away from the inner defensive perimeter, which they were able to penetrate and overwhelm the Egyptians in a matter of minutes, taking prisoners. The Egyptians counterattacked against the cemetery position several times, but could not dislodge the Golani forces. The first counterattack included 9 tanks, the remnants of the M22 Locust battalion that fought in Operation Assaf and on Hill 86. Five tanks were destroyed by Golani, and the Egyptians retreated. In the second counterattack (at 11:00), the Israelis destroyed four additional tanks. The third counterattack was mostly made up of infantry and armored vehicles with flamethrowers. By this time, most of Golani's weapons were either destroyed or jammed. After a PIAT hit one of the Egyptian armored vehicles, the latter retreated. At least 150 Egyptian soldiers were killed in their counterattacks.

On January 5, Golani moved west and took another position closer to the junction, which was still in Egyptian hands. Israeli ships and aircraft bombarded the Egyptian forces, inflicting a large number of casualties, mostly civilian; the Egyptians sought to block a mass flight to mainland Egypt, which would hurt morale among the population there.

In the meantime, Harel forces moved up the 'Auja–Rafah road and by 14:00 on January 4 had taken a number of outlying positions in the Sinai Peninsula just across the border. At 11:00 on January 5, they attacked the junction's southern position, but failed to take it. The brigade's 5th Battalion attacked at night and managed to take over both positions overlooking the junction by 02:00 on January 6. However, the Egyptians counterattacked during a sandstorm and retook the junction, surprising the Israelis, who retreated with 10 missing. An 8th Brigade reserve was brought from Gvulot, which conducted an assault on the western position of the junction in the afternoon, but the attack was unsuccessful.

On the night of January 6–7, the 4th Battalion (Harel), under David Elazar, captured an area further west and dug in, effectively surrounding the remaining Egyptian forces in Palestine, as envisioned by the Israeli command. An Egyptian supply convoy and a counterattack were stopped in this area on January 7. The Egyptians lost 8 tanks and armored vehicles in the counterattack. At the night of January 7–8, Israeli forces bombed the coastal railway to stop any possibility of supply for the encircled Egyptians. One mine they laid destroyed an Egyptian train carrying hundreds of wounded to al-Arish.

The final and decisive attack was planned for January 8, but the sandstorm caused the Israelis to set it off for another 24 hours. By this time, the Egyptian political echelon had agreed to negotiate armistice with the Israelis, on the condition that Israel withdraws its forces. The Southern Command chief Yigal Allon was against accepting the terms, but on January 7 Prime Minister David Ben-Gurion agreed. The ceasefire was officially declared on January 7 at 14:00, although final skirmishes were fought into the night. In light of that, the Israeli forces in the Harel Brigade's position (including reinforcements from the 8th Brigade) withdrew on January 9–10.

== Aftermath ==
The battle surrounding Rafah signified the end of major combat engagements in the 1948 Arab–Israeli War. The battle paved the way for the 1949 Armistice Agreements between Israel and Egypt, and the front lines at the end of the battle roughly corresponded to the armistice boundaries, except the cemetery position and the Beit Hanoun wedge, which were handed over to Egypt.
