= Yigal =

Yigal and Yigael (from Hebrew יגאל) are given names that mean "He (God) will redeem". People with those names include:

- Yigal Allon (1918–1980), Israeli politician, acting Prime Minister, a commander of the Palmach, and general
- Yigal Amir (born 1970), Israeli assassin of Prime Minister of Israel Yitzhak Rabin
- Yigal Antebi (born 1974), Israeli football player
- Yigal Arnon (1929–2014), Israeli lawyer and founder of Yigal Arnon & Co.
- Yigal Azrouël, Israeli-American fashion designer
- Yigal Bashan (1950–2018), Israeli singer-songwriter and actor
- Yigal Bibi (born 1942), Israeli politician
- Yigal Calek (1944–2024), British conductor and composer
- Yigal Carmon (born 1946), president and founder of the Middle East Media Research Institute (MEMRI)
- Yigal Cohen (1928–1988), Israeli politician
- Yigal Cohen-Orgad (1937–2019), Israeli politician
- Yigal Hurvitz (1918–1994), Israeli politician
- Yigal Menahem (born 1963), Israeli football player and lawyer
- Yigal Mossinson (1917–1994), Israeli novelist
- Yigal Naor (born 1958), Israeli actor
- Yigal Tumarkin (1933–2021), Israeli painter
- Igal Volodarsky (also Igal Dar) (1936-1977), Israeli basketball player
- Yigael Yadin (1917–1984), Israeli archeologist, politician, and the second Chief of Staff of the IDF
- Yigal Yasinov (born 1966), Israeli politician

== See also ==
- Igal (disambiguation), the Anglicized form of Yigal
- Yigal Arnon & Co. (founded in 1957), an Israeli law firm
