= Battles of the Sinai (1948) =

Battle in the Sinai Peninsula

Battles of Sinai
- Part of the 1948 Arab–Israeli War
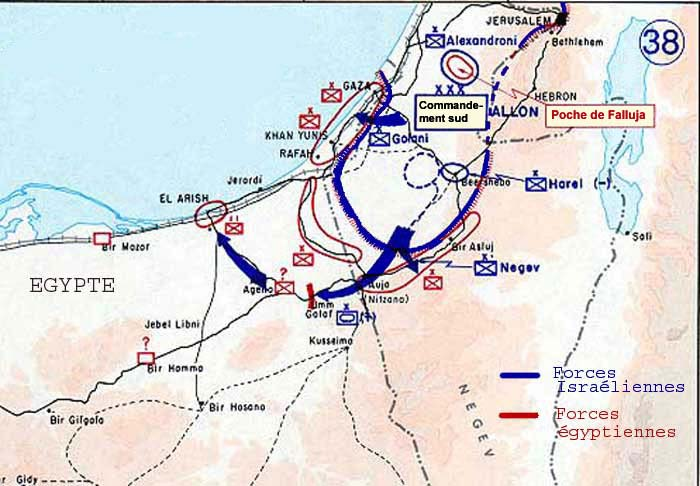
Date	December 28, 1948 – January 2, 1949
Location	Sinai Peninsula, Egypt
Result	Israeli withdrawal from Sinai

Belligerents
Egypt	Israel

The Battles of the Sinai refer to a series of military engagements between the Israel Defense Forces (IDF) and the Egyptian Army fought in the Sinai Peninsula from December 28, 1948 to January 2, 1949, as part of the Israeli Operation Horev. The IDF's Southern Command, under Yigal Allon, concentrated forces to push into the Sinai following their success in the Battle of Bir 'Asluj and the Battle of 'Auja.

Forces from the Negev and 8th brigades entered the Sinai on December 28 and at night captured Umm Katef and Abu Ageila, about 25km inside Egyptian territory. They continued north to al-Arish, which Allon planned to capture, in order to encircle the Egyptian expeditionary force in Palestine and end the war. However, due to political and diplomatic considerations, all Israeli forces retreated from the Sinai on January 2, 1949. Another attempt to encircle the Egyptian forces was made on the next day in the Battle of Rafah. Still, Prime Minister David Ben-Gurion ordered the IDF to turn back, ending military engagements in the war.

== Background ==
The third and final stage of the 1948 Arab–Israeli War started on October 15, 1948, when Israel launched Operation Yoav on the southern front. While the Israelis made significant tactical and strategic gains in Operation Yoav, the political situation changed little and Egypt was still dragging its feet on proposed armistice talks. Operation Horev was therefore launched in the south with the final aim of expelling all Egyptian forces from Israel.

== Prelude ==
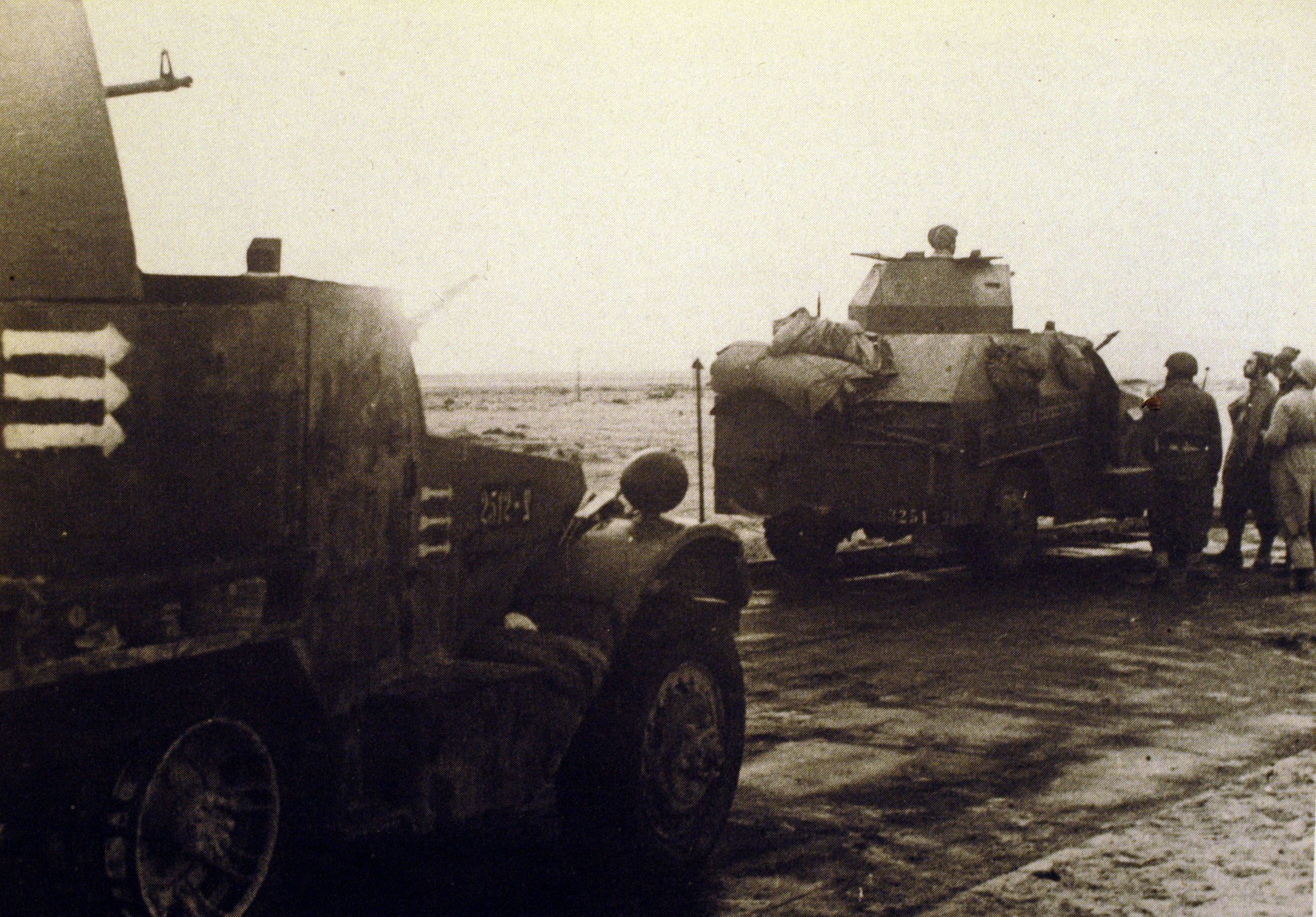
Israeli armored vehicles approaching the Sinai border

The main thrust of Operation Horev was in the south, and on December 25–27, Israeli forces captured the Beersheba–'Auja road, including Bir 'Asluj. The Southern Command decided to exploit this success in order to complete the rest of Operation Horev, namely, to surround and eventually expel all Egyptian forces from Palestine. The order was given to move into the Sinai Peninsula on the morning of December 28. This order directly contradicted the General Staff plan, which forbade entering Egyptian territory. According to Yitzhak Rabin, then the operations officer of the Southern Command, the command attempted to create facts on the ground before getting the necessary approval for the action.

The original Southern Command plan called for the thrust to be done by the 8th Brigade, but it had not had time to recover from the Battle of 'Auja, and it was necessary to quickly overwhelm the Egyptian forces in the peninsula, so the Southern Command decided to send the Negev Brigade instead. Abu Ageila was a small oasis in the desert situated on an important road junction. It contained a few clay houses and a village, a water well and a dam for water collection in the winter months.

=== Operation Beginning ===
While the battles on the Beersheba–'Auja road were raging, the IDF initiated Operation Beginning (Hebrew: מִבְצָע הַתְחָלָה, Mivtza Hatḥala) with the aim of cutting off supply to the Egyptian forces in Gaza by destroying sections of the coastal railway. At 11:15 on December 26, a force of sappers rendezvoused with the Israel Navy and two patrol boats, INS Sa'ar and INS Palmach, landed the troops in the Sinai, between al-Arish and Rafah, at 21:45.

The sappers planted their bombs on the 235th kilometer of the railway, returned to their ships at 03:00 on December 27, and the charges blew at 06:00.

== Battle of Umm Katef ==
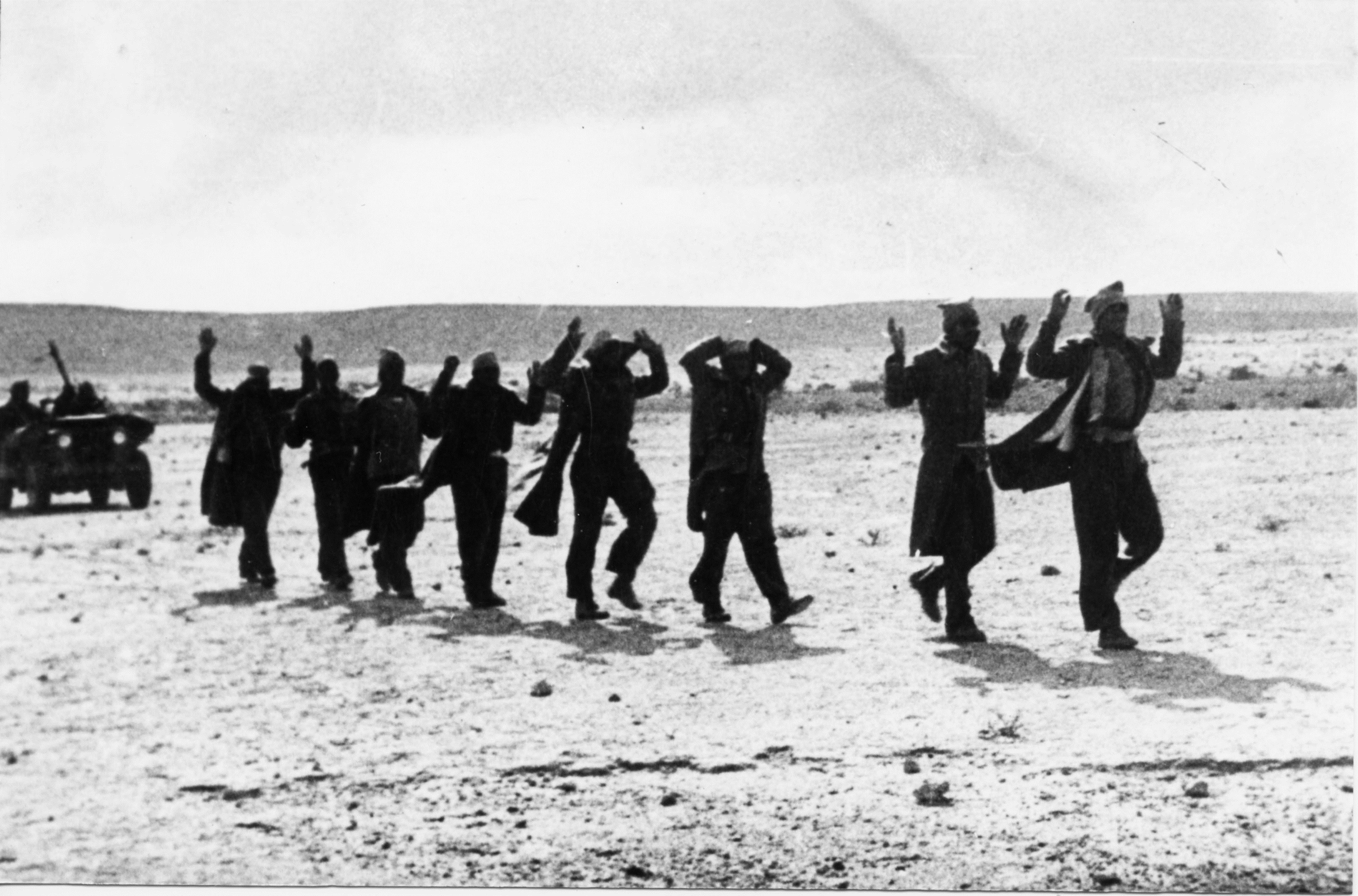
Egyptian prisoners at the entrance to Abu Ageila

The Israeli task force set out into the Sinai at 14:00 on December 28. This was the first time that many of the soldiers, including Yitzhak Rabin, visited another country. The force consisted, in the order of movement, of the Negev Brigade's 9th Battalion and staff, the 82nd Battalion of the 8th Brigade, and the Negev's 7th Infantry Battalion. Israeli aircraft mistakenly attacked them, killing one soldier and injuring another, until a flag resembling the Israeli (a military flag from the Jewish Brigade) was flown.

At 16:30, the force attacked Umm Katef, the position overlooking Abu Ageila. The Egyptians had a strength of about one battalion. They repelled the Israeli attack with anti-tank fire, while part of the attacking 9th Battalion got bogged down in the sands and failed to reach the position. At this time, the IDF Chief of Operations Yigael Yadin sent out an order to Yigal Allon not to capture Abu Ageila until the latter came to see him.

At night, Israeli artillery began a barrage on Umm Katef. The 7th Battalion then outflanked the position, and by 02:30 on December 29, it was in Israeli hands. The Egyptians retreated to Abu Ageila, and when the Israelis entered it at dawn, the Egyptians left for al-Arish. Ten vehicles, three PIATs and small arms were captured at Umm Katef. In the meantime, Harel Brigade forces, including its staff, also entered the Sinai. Upon capturing the area, the Negev forces set free the Palestinian Arab prisoners who had been held by the Egyptians, but took in several hundred Egyptians who surrendered.

== Raids and advance to al-Arish ==
After the capture of Abu Ageila, the bulk of the Israeli task force continued north, while units from the 7th Battalion remained to dig in. It met with Egyptian aerial bombardment that attempted to slow their advance to the al-Arish area. At 15:00 on December 29, the 9th Battalion captured the airfield at Bir Lahfan without encountering resistance. In the evening, Bir Lahfan, about 13 km south of al-Arish, was taken by the 82nd Battalion, which defeated the Egyptian battalion stationed there. They managed to capture the battalion commander—the highest-ranking Egyptian officer to be taken alive by Israel during the war—and four aircraft.

While Yigal Allon's objective was the capture of al-Arish itself, he withheld this information from his superiors. His forces pushed on towards al-Arish and stopped about 8 km to the south of the city. Fearing for the aircraft, the Egyptians emptied the nearby airbases. Meanwhile, on December 29, Harel and Negev forces conducted raids deep into the Sinai Peninsula. Three platoons from the 7th Battalion meant to raid the Bir al-Hamma airfield, but met with heavy fire and retreated. However, they managed to destroy three airplanes on the ground. On December 31, a platoon from the 10th Battalion (Harel Brigade) raided Bir al-Hassana and captured about 200–500 prisoners. Other Harel forces from the 10th and 4th battalions, stationed at 'Auja, attacked and captured Kusseima on the same day, taking dozens of prisoners.

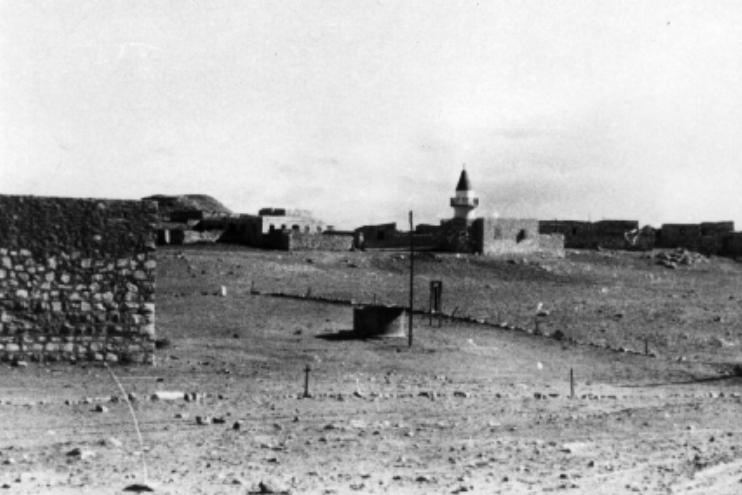
Bir al-Hassana, 100km inside Egypt, 1948

On the evening of December 29, Yigal Allon visited Nahum Sarig and the Negev Brigade staff at Bir Lahfan and ordered the forces to organize for the capture of al-Arish at midnight. He then flew to Tel Aviv to meet Yadin, who was sick at home, and tried to persuade him to authorize his plan to capture al-Arish and encircle the Egyptians in the Gaza corridor. However, he failed and ordered his troops to withhold the assault. A subsequent meeting with Prime Minister David Ben-Gurion in the morning of December 30 did not change matters. On the next day, the Israeli forces returned to Abu Ageila. The complete withdrawal from the Sinai Peninsula lasted until January 2, 1949.

Despite the refusal to fight in the Sinai, Yadin permitted Allon to instead move from 'Auja to Rafah and encircle the Egyptians from there. While by the time of Yadin and Ben-Gurion's refusal, there had been almost no international pressure to stop the advance into the Sinai, partly because it had not been clear whether the Sinai had indeed been invaded, on December 30 both the British and American government called for Israel's withdrawal to the international boundary, and the British allowed the Egyptians to use their airbases in Egypt for refueling.

== Aftermath ==
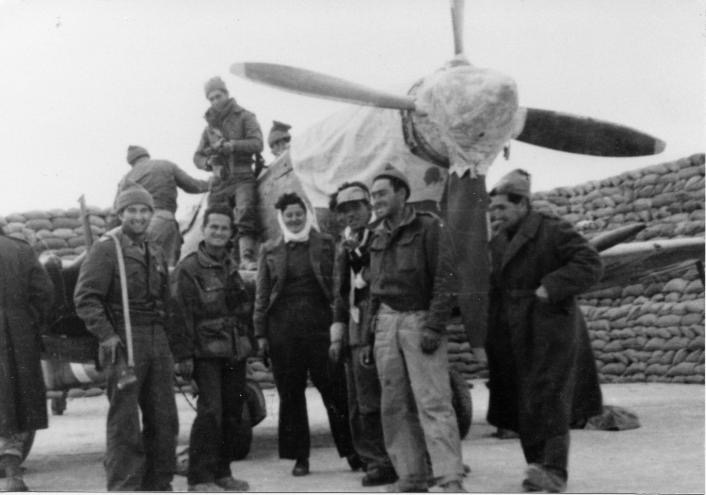
Members of the Harel Brigade at el Arish airfield, December 1948. 2nd from left Uzi Narkis.

The battles of the Sinai officially ended the first part of Operation Horev. While the IDF was denied its space to maneuver in the Sinai against the Egyptian forces still on its territory, it subsequently attacked Rafah and encircled the entire Egyptian expeditionary force. However, by this time the Egyptian government announced its agreement to negotiate armistice with the Israelis, which caused Ben-Gurion to order the troops' withdrawal yet again, effectively ending combat in the war.

The Sinai Peninsula saw a number of skirmishes in the early 1950s between Israeli and Egyptian forces, culminating in Operation Volcano in 1955. The next war fought in the area was the 1956 Suez War. The area of Umm Katef – Abu Ageila also saw fighting in the 1967 Six-Day War.
