= Battle of Abu-Ageila (disambiguation) =

The term Battle of Abu-Ageila may refer to the following events:

- Battles of the Sinai (1948), including a battle for Umm Katef and Abu Ageila, in the 1948 Arab–Israeli War
- Battle of Abu-Ageila (1956) during the Suez Crisis
- Battle of Abu-Ageila during the Six-Day War in 1967
