= Battle of Hill 86 =

Coordinates: 31°22′29.64″N 34°22′9.84″E

- Part of the 1948 Arab–Israeli War
| Date | December 22–23, 1948 |
| Location | Hill 86 |
| Result | Egyptian tactical victory |

Belligerents
| Israel (IDF) | Egypt |

Commanders and leaders
| David Ben-Gurion | Muhammad Naguib |

Units involved
| Golani Brigade | Unknown |

Strength
| 1 infantry battalion | Unknown |

Casualties and losses
| 13 killed 35 wounded | Unknown |

The Battle of Hill 86 was a military engagement between the Israel Defense Forces and the Egyptian Army as part of Operation Horev. It was fought on December 22–23, 1948, and was the first battle of the operation. The Israelis initiated the battle, as well as a concurrent raid on the Arab village of 'Abasan and aerial and naval shelling of the coastal strip, with the hope of deceiving the Egyptians into thinking that the coming operation would be aimed at isolating the Egyptian forces in Gaza.

The 13th Battalion of the Golani Brigade captured the hill on the night of December 22–23, but weather conditions prevented reinforcements from coming forward with essential supplies. The Egyptians counterattacked in the morning; the Israelis retreated after suffering over 40 casualties.

== Background ==
The third and final stage of the 1948 Arab–Israeli War started on October 15, 1948, when Israel launched Operation Yoav on the southern front. This was part of the backdrop of Folke Bernadotte's second plan for the partition of Palestine, which called for the entire Negev desert to be part of the Arab state, contrary to the 1947 partition plan. While the Israelis made significant tactical and strategic gains in Operation Yoav, the political situation changed little—Egypt was dragging its feet on proposed armistice talks, and the Israeli government feared that the Bernadotte plan was still relevant internationally. Operation Horev was therefore launched in the south with the final aim of expelling all Egyptian forces from Israel.

The main thrust of the operation was planned to be in the south and east of the southern front, with the initial aim of cutting-off the eastern wing of the Egyptian army from the bulk of its forces in Palestine. To make the task easier, the Israeli command decided to divert the Egyptians' attention by staging an assault against their main troop concentration in what today is the Gaza Strip. Hill 86, strategically located 2 kilometres (1.2 mi) east of the coastal road and coastal railway, was chosen as the target.

== Raid on 'Abasan ==
Before the march on Hill 86, itself a diversionary attack, the Israelis made other diversions to ease the capture of the hill, in the form of heavy shelling of the coastal strip by their 75 mm guns and a raid on the Arab village of 'Abasan, located about 5 kilometres (3.1 mi) southeast of Khan Younis. 'Abasan served as the staging area for the Egyptian forces in the battles of Operation Assaf.

The Israeli force consisted of several armored vehicles and armored personnel carriers with infantry. They left at 02:00 on December 23 and quickly captured the village. However, the Egyptians withdrew to an antitank position just west. The Israelis had not known about this position and at least two of their vehicles were put out of commission as they approached. The Israeli commander of the raid was killed, the remainder retreated under a smoke screen.

== Battle ==
In the night of December 22–23, the Golani Brigade's 13th Battalion left its base in the nearby locality of Shu'ut and arrived at Hill 112. They left heavy weapons such as 3" mortars and antitank guns on the hill and continued northwest toward Hill 86. The Israelis were subjected to artillery fire, which wounded several soldiers, although it is not clear whether they were discovered or the guns were fired randomly. Disoriented, the unit had trouble finding their destination, but nevertheless managed to completely surprise the Egyptians when they found it, capturing the position.

Meanwhile, the support unit which possessed the heavy guns set out to reinforce the infantry. It met with logistical problems at Wadi Salka, which was full of water at this time of the year, and was surrounded by dirt and quicksand. In addition, Egyptian artillery bombarded the area. The reinforcements were forced to leave much of their matériel behind and allocate a contingent to bring it back to base.

The Egyptians returned fire from Dribat ash-Sheikh Hamuda only 200 metres (220 yd) to the south. An Egyptian convoy moving from north to south was intercepted by the Israelis and its weapons were used in the subsequent defense of the position. At 06:00 on December 23, they started their main counterattack, which consisted of about twenty tanks, four armored vehicles with mounted flamethrowers and two infantry companies. The attack came from the north, west and south, but was beaten back by the Israelis, who, lacking proper antitank weapons, employed the four PIATs (Projector, Infantry, Anti-tank), in their possession. The Egyptian commander of the 10th Infantry Brigade Group, Brigadier General Muhammad Naguib, who would later become the president of Egypt, was seriously injured in the chest and pronounced dead, but managed to recover.

Until noon, the Egyptian infantry stayed back at a distance of about 150 metres (160 yd) or more from the hill and only the armored vehicles made direct assaults. As the infantry began to advance, the situation of the Israeli battalion became dire; it was almost out of ammunition, most of the medics and PIAT operators had been killed or wounded, the communication devices did not work and there was no artillery support. The position held on however, but after the rain that had been going on stopped, the Egyptian mounted flamethrowers entered the battle. This was the first time they had employed such a weapon. One of them was hit by friendly fire, but nevertheless they managed to inflict significant damage on the Israelis.

After the destruction of the armored vehicle, the Egyptians retreated to reorganize and the remaining Israeli forces staged a final counterattack with one remaining PIAT round. However, during the attack, they discovered that the Egyptians had a significant operational reserve of armored vehicles that would be impossible to destroy. The 13th Battalion began to retreat, without organization or order, losing many lives in the process. The Israeli officer who served as deputy commander of the 13th Battalion was killed in action and left in the field. Twelve other Israelis were killed, 35 were wounded and a few were captured.

== Aftermath ==
Despite the heavy losses and failure suffered by the Israeli forces, the strategic goal of the operation was met – the Egyptians focused their attention on the Gaza corridor, thinking that the Israelis intended to cut off their divisional headquarters there. When the Egyptians searched the body of the dead Israeli commander, they found documents pertaining to the attack, but which did not discuss it in a broader context, and this reinforced their belief that the aim was to disconnect the Gaza forces. An Egyptian officer wrote:

The Israeli objective in the capture of the position was clear: to disconnect and destroy the expeditionary force in Gaza and thus repeat the tragedy of Fallujah. Capturing this position meant evacuating large parts of the front, as was the case when the Jews attacked a position of similar importance in the area of Beit Hanoun. In all their last attacks, the Jews harassed the transportation junctions in an aim of disconnecting the Egyptian army and scatter it in every direction. This was also their aim in the case of Hill 86.

In Operation Horev, the Israelis went on to capture Bir 'Asluj and Auja al-Hafir, cutting off the eastern wing of the Egyptian expeditionary force, before venturing into the Sinai Peninsula, taking a number of key positions there.

== Bibliography ==
- Lorch, Netanel (1998). History of the War of Independence (in Hebrew). Modan Publishing.
- Morris, Benny (2008). 1948: The First Arab–Israeli War. Yale University Press. ISBN 978-0-300-15112-1.
- Wallach, Jehuda, ed. (1978). "Security". Carta's Atlas of Israel (in Hebrew). Vol. First Years 1948–1961. Carta Jerusalem.
