= Beit Hanoun wedge =

Land captured by Israel in 1948 war

Coordinates: 31°32′30″N 34°32′10″E

Battle of Beit Hanoun wedge
- Part of the 1948 Arab–Israeli War
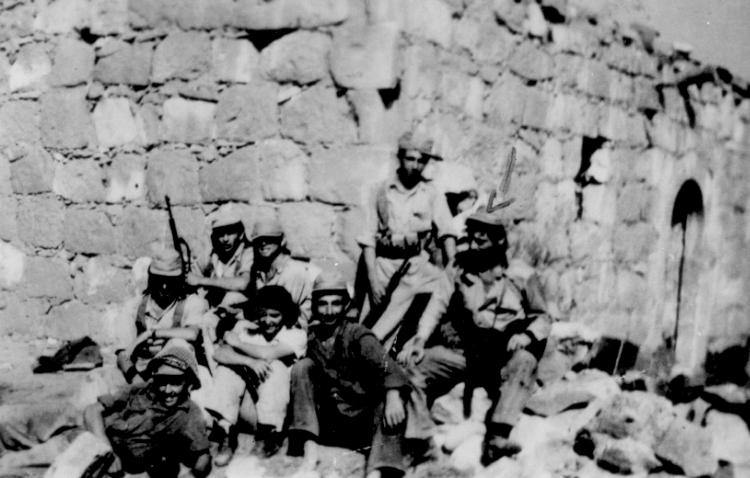
- Yiftach Brigade in Beit Hanoun, 22 October 1948
Date	October 15 – October 22, 1948
Location	Beit Hanoun, Mandatory Palestine
Result	Israeli tactical failure in dividing the Egyptian expeditionary force
Territorial changes	Israel occupies Beit Hanoun until the 1949 Armistice Agreements

Belligerents
Israel	Egypt

Commanders and leaders
Moshe Dayan; Shimon Avidan	King Farouk I

The Beit Hanoun wedge (Hebrew: טְרִיז בֵּיתּ חָנוּן, Triz Beit Hanun) was a piece of land around Beit Hanoun (today in the Gaza Strip) that the Israel Defense Forces captured during Operation Yoav in the final stage of the 1948 Arab–Israeli War. With this and other wedges, the Israelis hoped to divide various units in the Egyptian army's expeditionary force in Palestine as part of Operation Yoav's plan. The battles around the wedge were fought on October 15–22, 1948. Creating the wedge involved the capture of a series of positions overlooking Beit Hanoun between October 15–19, and eventually taking the village itself between October 20–22.

The Israelis deployed a reinforced battalion from the Yiftach Brigade for the operation, with another battalion in the reserve. On the first day, eight outlying positions were captured with little resistance, and bridges surrounding Beit Hanoun were blown up. The Egyptians created a bypass to the west of the road and managed to evacuate their staff. The Israelis captured Beit Hanoun on October 19–20 and more outlying positions, which forced Egypt to move their forces through the sands between the road and the Mediterranean Sea. The Beit Hanoun wedge as a tactic was unsuccessful, because the objective of dividing the Egyptian expeditionary force was not achieved, but it accomplished other strategic goals in Operation Yoav.

== Background ==
The second truce of the 1948 Arab–Israeli War started on July 18, 1948, with an Israeli enclave in the Negev disconnected from the rest of the country. Military operations, including An-Far, Death to the Invader and GYS, to create a corridor between the two areas, failed. The United Nations mediator Folke Bernadotte's second plan for Palestine became known on September 20, days after Bernadotte was assassinated by the Lehi. This plan envisioned the Israeli Negev enclave to be handed over to the Arab side.

Israel's military options were pondered by its leadership during the second truce, and the Bernadotte Plan prompted the government and army to decide to concentrate the next effort on the southern front. The Operation, codenamed The Ten Plagues, was meant to open a permanent ground connection to the Negev, and gradually encircle the Egyptian forces in the Majdal – Bayt Jibrin corridor by creating wedges that would deny the Egyptians free movements between their main troop concentrations. This was the approach favored by Yigal Allon, head of the Southern Command, which mostly won over the General Staff's proposals to directly assault the large Egyptian concentrations.

The Yiftach Brigade, which previously had participated in Operation GYS but was not native to the Negev theater, was an integral part of the operation, and already infiltrated the area in Operation Avak during the second truce. Forces from the 8th and 9th brigades (the IDF's operational reserve) were also brought in to assist. Beit Hanoun was a Palestinian Arab village in southwestern Palestine, just northeast of Gaza, located on the coastal road. Its vicinity was selected as one of the three main wedge locations, the others being Khirbet Masara, southeast of Iraq al-Manshiyya, and Kawkaba.

== Creating the wedge ==
On the night of October 15, 1948, Israel sent a convoy to the Negev, hoping that the Egyptians would shoot at it and give the Israeli forces an excuse to start the operation. The forces for creating the two wedges set out. The Yiftach force consisted of three companies from the 3rd Battalion, two platoons from the 8th Battalion (Negev Brigade), two 65 mm cannon batteries, one 75 mm cannon battery, one mortar platoon, one machine gun platoon, two mobile 20 mm cannons. Another reinforced battalion was placed in the operational reserve.

Most of the forces moved to the northwest from Nir Am to a line about 600 m east of Beit Hanoun. On the first night, eight positions were captured with only light resistance: Hill 113.9 just north of Nir Am, where they set up the mission's headquarters, and Hills 81.2, 75.6, 79.6, 78.7, 84.4, 80.1 and 110.7. Meanwhile, a small contingent moved to the north and south of Beit Hanoun and blew up the road bridges around the village—above Wadi al-Halib to the south and Wadi al-Hesi. The railway bridge was rendered unusable. The Egyptians attempted a counterattack on Hill 81.2 (the northernmost one held by Israel) in the same night, but were repelled. An Egyptian armored force that attempted to reinforce Beit Hanoun from the south met with heavy fire from the Israeli forces at the southern bridge and retreated.

At 15:00 on October 16, the Israelis staged a raid on Dimra, but failed to take the village. They also took heavy aircraft and artillery fire from the Egyptians, who were able to inflict significant damage because the Israelis were not properly dug in and the engineers had not yet finished creating proper cover. On October 17, the Egyptians sent troops to Hill 60.3 ("The Tree"), just north of 81.2. An Egyptian convoy going south from Majdal at 08:00 was fired at by Yiftach, and started moving west of the main road. Some vehicles were hit, but the majority successfully avoiding the Israeli guns. At night, Yiftach took Hill 81, slightly closer to the road. On October 18, the Egyptians staged another attack on Israeli-held positions, this time 75.6 and 81. The day after that, they evacuated their divisional staff from Majdal, under a smoke screen and heavy air and artillery barrage, using the alternative path created by the previous convoys.

Seeing that their wedge was ineffective, the Israelis sought to deepen it. On the night of October 19–20, the Yiftach forces took over Beit Hanoun itself in the west, and Hill 60.3 and Dimra in the north. On the following night, Hills 57 and 70, overlooking Beit Hanoun, were captured to strengthen the hold on the wedge. Egyptian forces were thus unable to use their alternative road and created yet another bypass, this time in the sands further to the west. This involved significant engineering work, and a makeshift road of wood and wire netting was laid on the shoreline, which trucks and armored vehicles were able to move through.

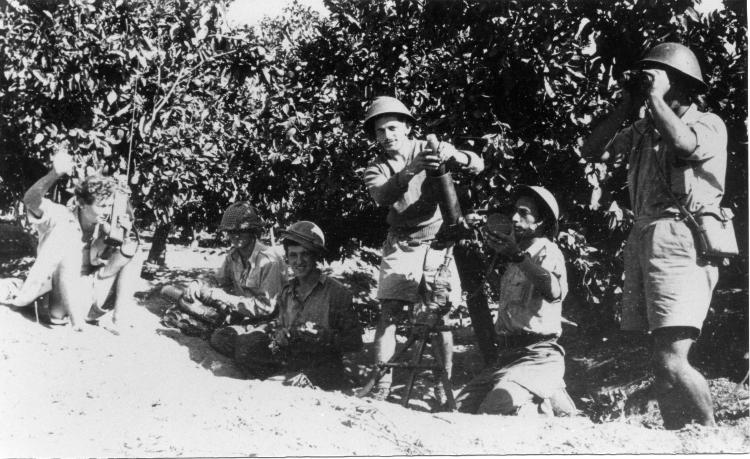
Yiftach Brigade 3" mortar in action. Beit Hanoun. 1948

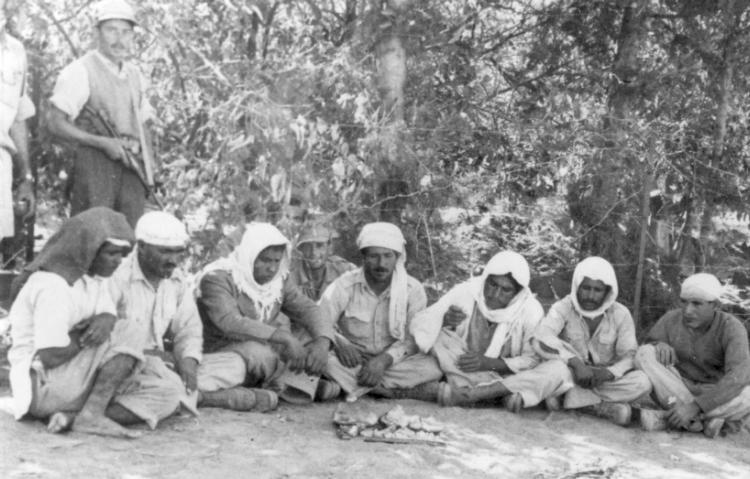
Caption from Palmach archive: "Egyptian prisoners - Beit Hanoun." 22/10/1948

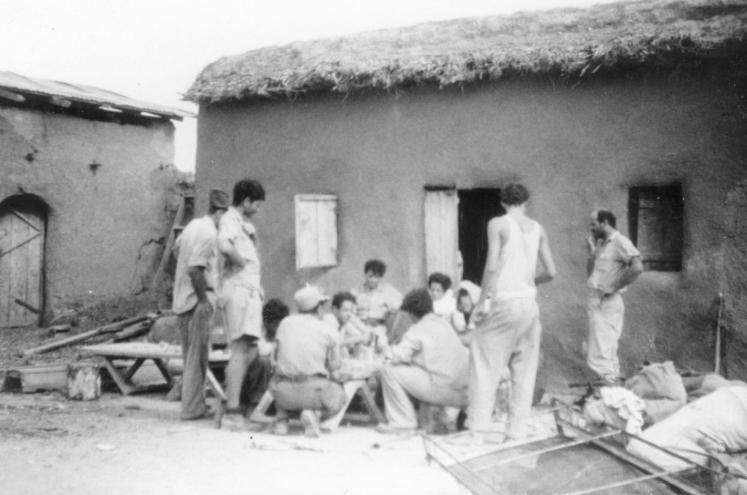
Yiftach Brigade quartered in Beit Hanoun. 1948

== Aftermath and impact ==
The Beit Hanoun wedge was largely ineffective in cutting off the Egyptian headquarters, in part because the Egyptians saw the situation as extremely grave, and fought desperately to get their units through. On the other hand, it achieved a strategic goal—a significant number of Egyptian forces were allocated to fighting the Israelis in the wedge, which eased the other battles of Operation Yoav for Israel.

Some scholars are of the opinion however, that completely cutting off the Egyptian headquarters was never an objective of the wedge. They believe that the Israelis foresaw a situation like that of the Fallujah Pocket, where a large stationary Egyptian force was indeed surrounded, eventually leading to heavy Israeli casualties and a failure to take the pocket. The Beit Hanoun wedge, however, created just enough of a panic for Egypt to start evacuating major forces, but prevented a situation where they would dig in and pose a significant obstacle. The forces that would later be trapped in the Fallujah Pocket were indeed part of the Egyptian division headquarters' withdrawal request.

As part of the 1949 Armistice Agreements between Israel and Egypt, Israel agreed to hand over territories around Rafah and Beit Hanoun, including the wedge, in exchange for the Egyptian evacuation of the Fallujah Pocket.
