= Igal =

Igal may refer to:

== People ==
- Igal (biblical figure), son of Joseph of Issachar
- Igal Brener, physicist
- Igal Naor (born 1958), Israeli actor
- Igal Talmi (1925–2026), Israeli nuclear physicist

== Other ==
- Igal, Hungary, a town in Hungary
- Igal, Navarre, a town in Salazar Valley, Spain
- Agal (accessory), an accessory to secure a keffiyeh or headcloth

== See also ==
- Igala (disambiguation)
- Yigal (disambiguation), the Hebraicized form of Igal
