= Yigal Arnon & Co. =

Israeli law firm

Arnon, Tadmor-Levi Advocates and Notary
- Type: Partnership (Israel)
- Industry: Law
- Founded: 1957
- Headquarters: Tel Aviv, Israel and Jerusalem, Israel
- Key people: Yigal Arnon, Founder
- Products: Legal advice
- Number of employees: 500+
- Website: http://www.arnon.co.il/

Arnon, Tadmor-Levi (previously Yigal Arnon & Co), founded by Yigal Arnon in Jerusalem in the late 1950s, is the 4th largest law firm in Israel. It has offices in Tel Aviv and Jerusalem, and more than 350 lawyers, of whom 140 are partners. Its Tel Aviv offices are located in two of the Azrieli Towers.

On 16 March 2022, the Arnon firm announced its merger with Israeli law firm Tadmor - Levi, & Co., at the time the 17th largest firm in Israel. The merged firm is the 4th largest firm in Israel.

In September 2025 it was reported negotiations were ongoing for a merger between Arnon, Tadmor-Levi and Meitar, which would result in the creation of Israel's largest law firm.
