= 1969 Israeli Labor Party leadership election =

Israeli Labor Party leadership election

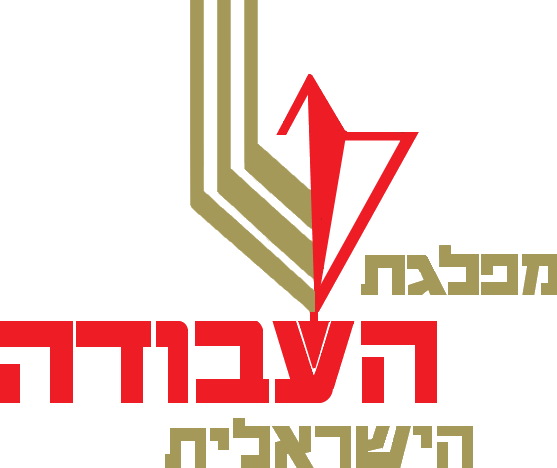
- 7 March 1969

vote by Central Committee of party
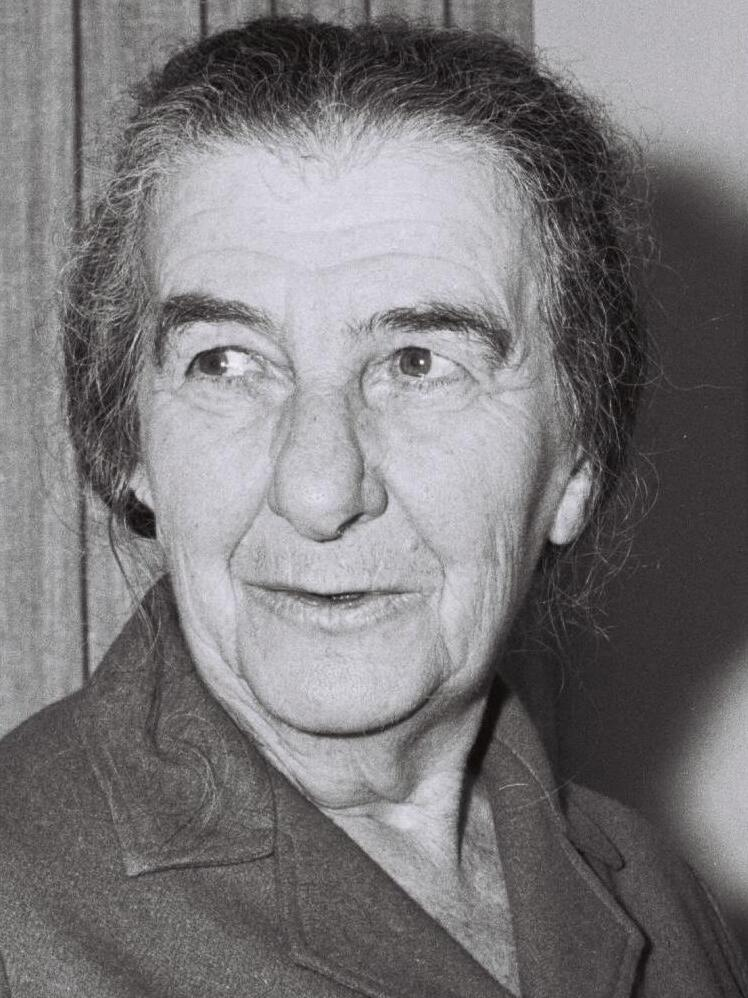
Candidate	Golda Meir
Popular vote	287
Percentage	100%
Leader before election
Vacant
(most recently Levi Eshkol)
Elected Leader
Golda Meir

The 1969 Israeli Labor Party leadership election was held on 7 March 1969. Held in the aftermath of the death in office of party leader and prime minister Levi Eshkol, it saw the party's Central Committee elect Golda Meir as the party's new leader.

== Campaign ==
On 26 February 1969, Levi Eshkol, the leader of the Israeli Labor Party and prime minister of Israel died, becoming Israel's first prime minister die in office. After this, Yigal Allon became acting prime minister. The individual that would be elected as Eshkol's successor as the leader of the Israeli Labor Party was seen as all but certain to become Israel's new prime minister.

Allon and Defense Minister Moshe Dayan both desired to become the new party leader. However, neither of them had been integral members of the party establishment, and each faced significant resistance from significant portions of the party. Allon was regarded as too left wing by the "Old Guard" socialists. Dayan was a controversial figure that was more popular with young Israelis than he was inside of the party. Ultimately, the party's "Old Guard" (which had great influence on the election process) decided to support Golda Meir. Meir had long been held as one of the most influential members of the Israeli Labor Party's organization, was a political foe of Dayan. However, Meir was reluctant to serve, expressing concerns about her health. Meir voiced her support for Allon to serve as party leader and prime minister.

On 2 March 1969, the Cabinet ministers belonging to the Israeli Labor Party held a vote in which they endorsed Meir as their preference to be the next leader/prime minister. On 3 March 1969, the party's leadership bureau endorsed Meir for leader in a unanimous 40–0 vote, with seven abstentions. The abstentions came from Dayan and six other members former members of the Rafi party that had merged with the Israeli Labor Party the previous year. After the leadership bureau meeting, Dayan stated that he would abide (even with reluctance) by whatever decision that the party's Central Committee would make on 7 March, which was seen by political observers as a declaration that he would not be contesting the leadership. This was regarded as a surprise to political observers. Meir, for her part, indicated after the meeting that she was willing to consider serving, remarking, "I always accept decisions of party institutions. I will think I about what I heard at this committee, and then I'll reach my conclusion."

Some saw the vote for Meir as merely making her an effectively-temporary successor to Eshkol, rather than a long-term one. It was unclear, due to her age and health, how long Meir might serve if elected. Many had speculated she would merely act as a transitional party leader and prime minister, whose tenure would serve to avoid a clash between younger politicians in the immediate wake of Eshkol's passing.

== Results ==
The party's Central Committee voted unanimously (albeit with 45 abstentions) for Meir to lead the part. Nearly all who abstained were believed to have been supporters of Dayan. After the vote, Meir accepted the position as leader of the party for the upcoming Knesset election, declaring she would accept this appointment just as she had accepted all past party decisions. She declared that, while she had been in awe of the responsibilities she had given in the previous few years, "nothing has been comparable to this moment". She also vowed to preserve unity among the government's factions.

1969 Israeli Labor Party leadership election
Candidate	Votes	%
Golda Meir	287	100
Abstentions	45	n/a
