= Yitzhak Sadeh =

Israeli general (1890–1952)

- יצחק שדה
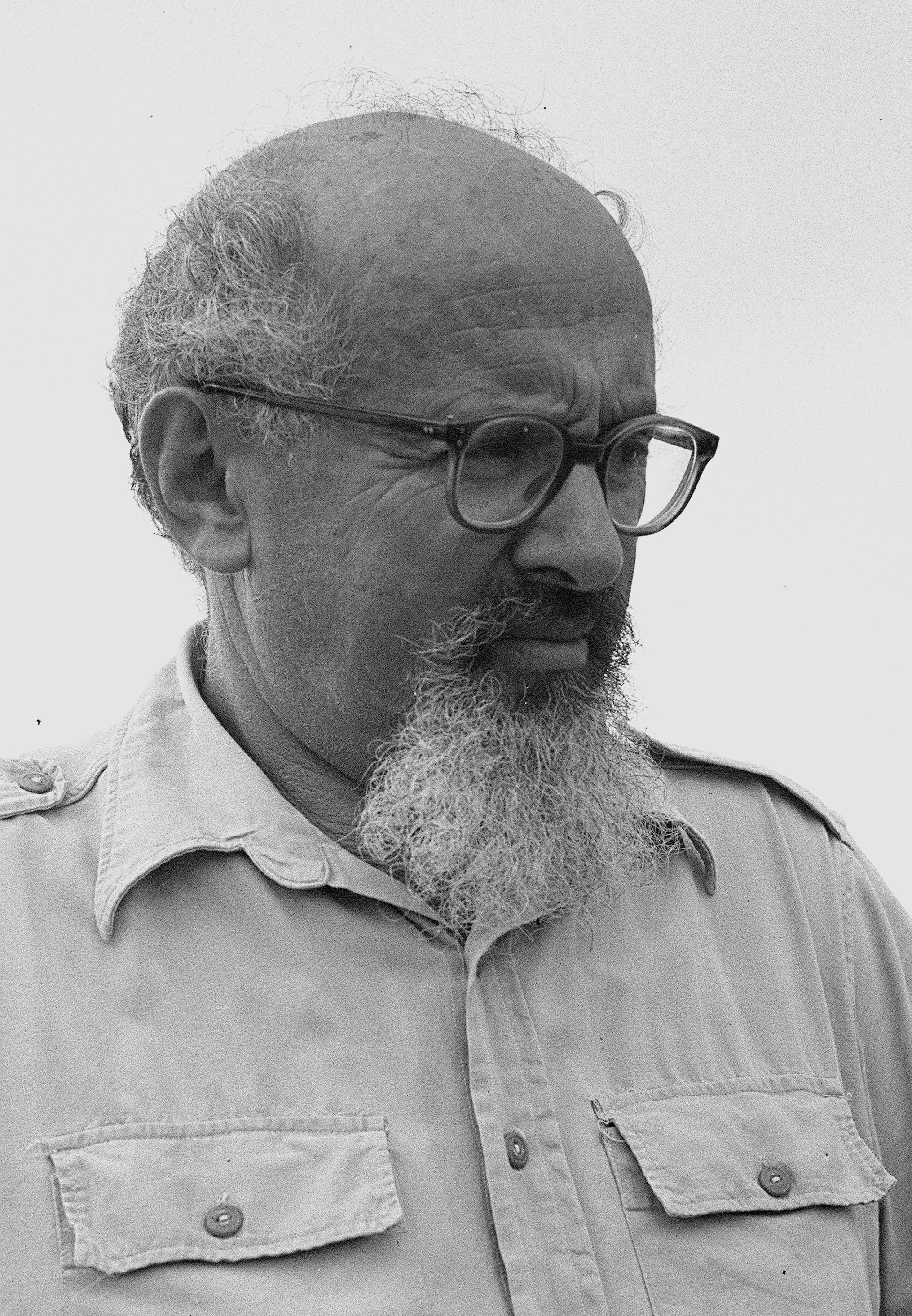
- General Sadeh, 1950
- Born: Izaak Landoberg; August 10, 1890; Lublin, Congress Poland, Russian Empire (current Poland)
- Died: August 20, 1952 (aged 62); Tel Aviv, Israel
- Military career
- Allegiance: Russian Empire; Israel
- Branch: Imperial Russian Army; Palmach
- Rank: Commander
- Nickname: HaZaken (the old man)

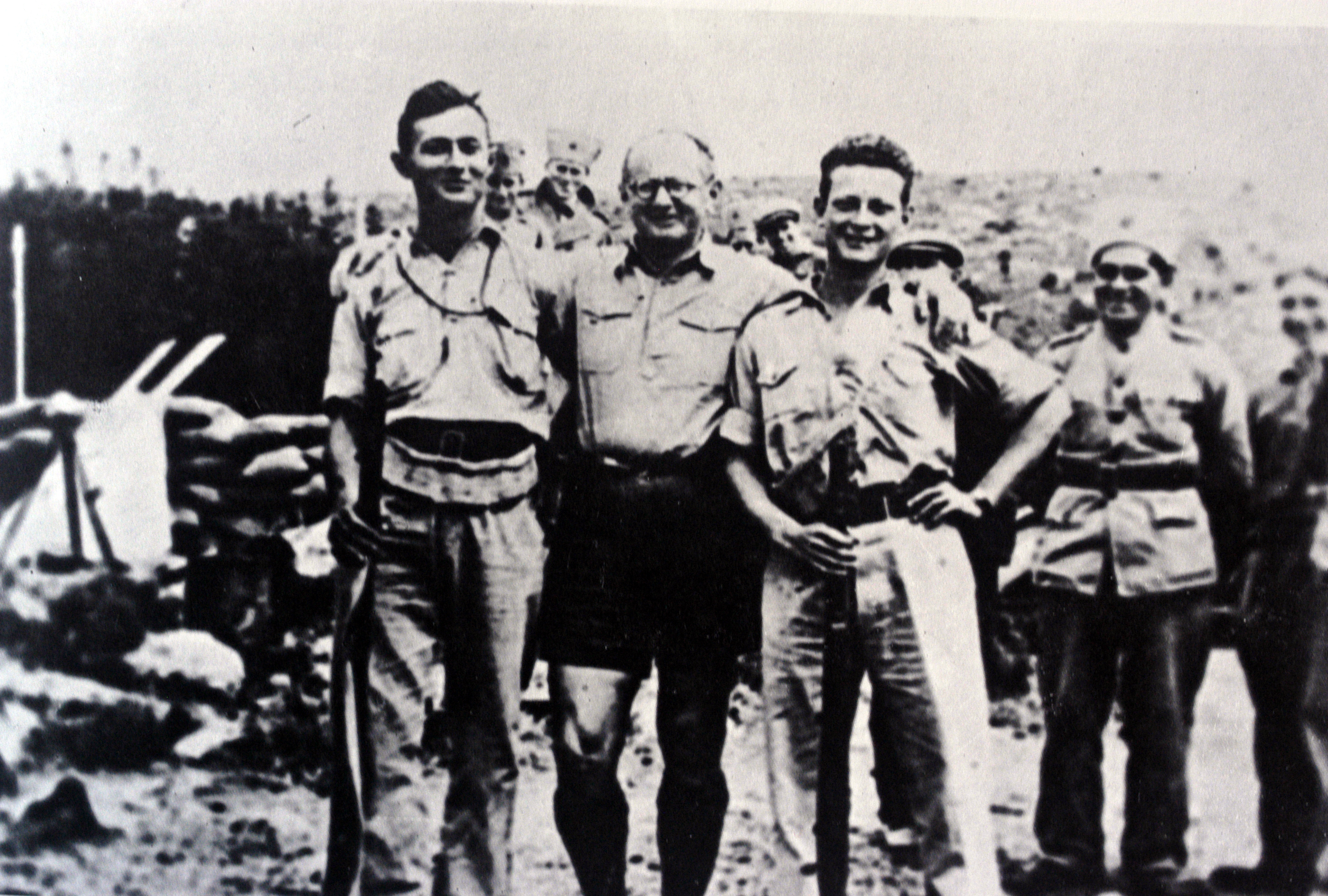
Moshe Dayan, Yitzhak Sadeh, and Yigal Allon. Kibbutz Hanita, 1938

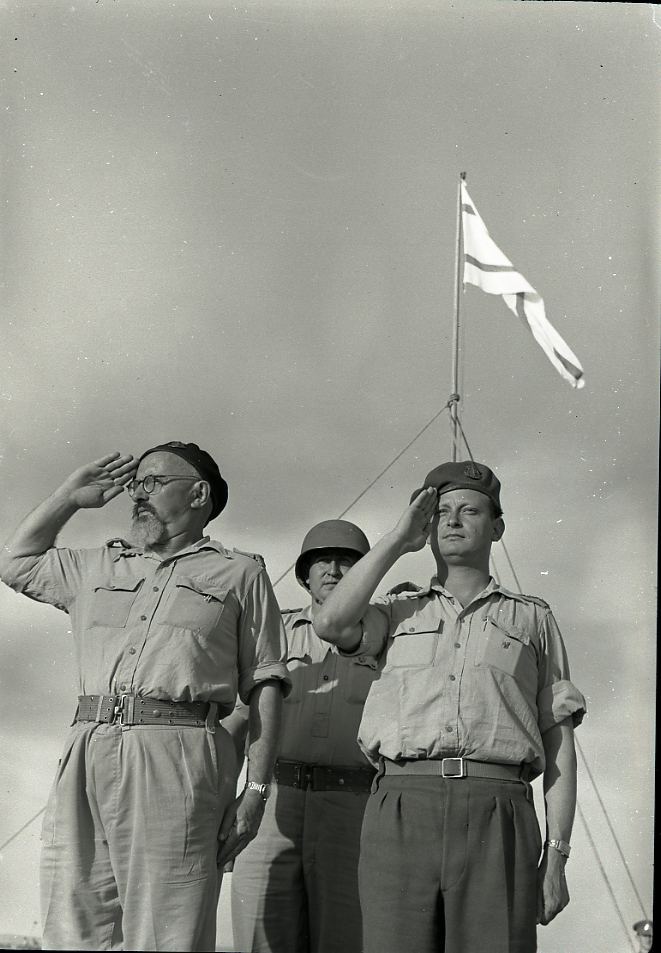
Sadeh (left) and Yigal Allon, 1948

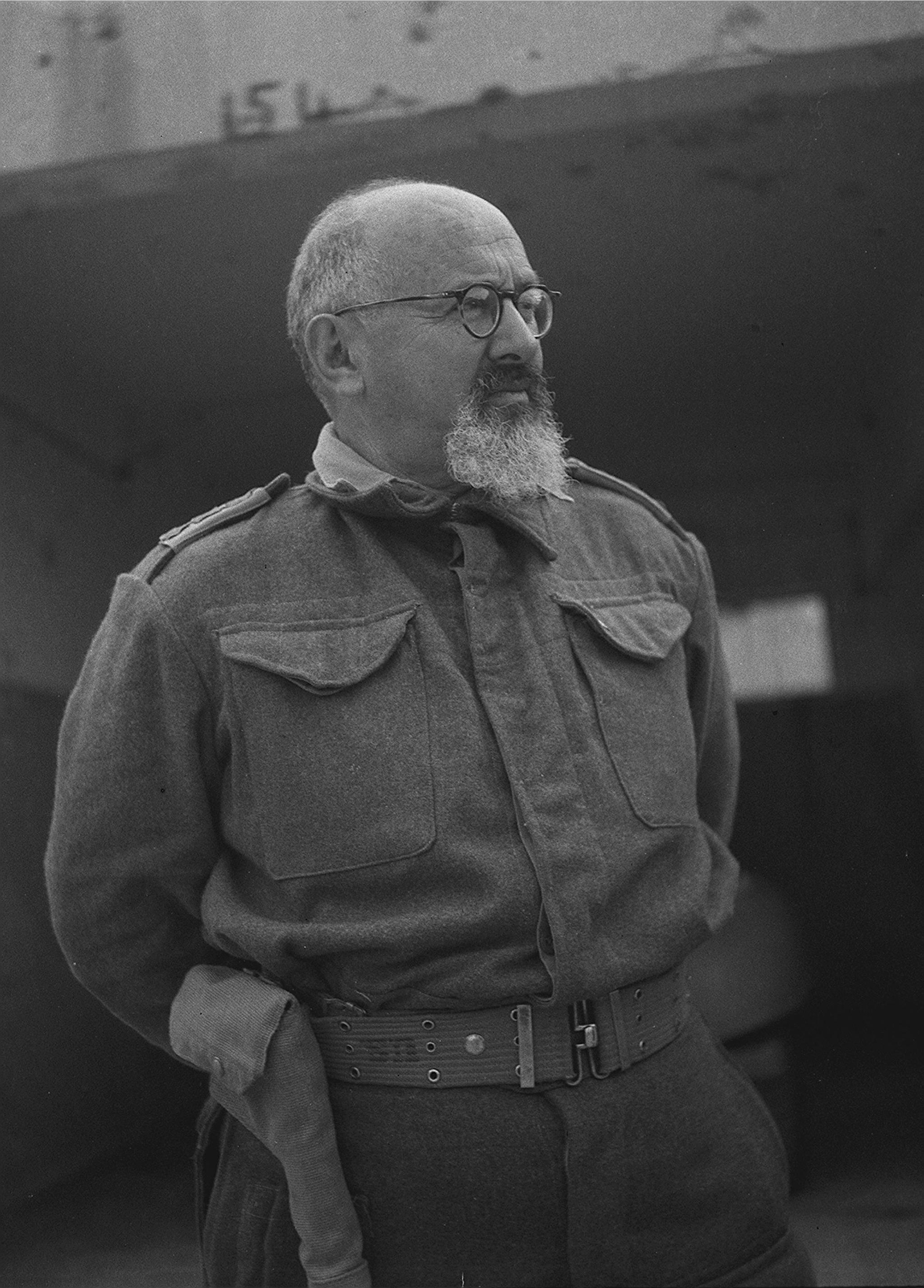
Yitzhak Sadeh in 1949

Yitzhak Sadeh (Hebrew: יצחק שדה; born Izaak Landoberg, August 10, 1890 – August 20, 1952), was the commander of the Palmach and one of the founders of the Israel Defense Forces at the time of the establishment of the State of Israel.

== Biography ==
Sadeh was born as Izaak Landoberg to a Polish Jewish family in Lublin, in the Russian Partition of the Russian Empire (now in Poland). His mother, Rebecca, was the daughter of rabbi Shneur Zalman Fradkin. In his youth, he studied with rabbi Hillel Zeitlin. Sadeh married three times. His third wife, Margot Meier-Sadeh, died of cancer a year before he did. He had two daughters, Iza Dafni and Rivka Sfarim, and a son, Yoram Sadeh.

Sadeh died in Tel Aviv in August 1952. By then he had become a charismatic and colorful figure whose nickname in the Palmach was HaZaken (The Old Man). He is buried at Kibbutz Givat Brenner.

== Military career ==
When World War I broke out, he joined the Imperial Russian Army. He saw action and was decorated for bravery. In 1917, he met Joseph Trumpeldor, and between 1917 and 1919 assisted him in the founding of HeHalutz ('The Pioneer') movement. In 1920 Sadeh moved to Palestine, where he became one of the founders and leaders of Gdud HaAvoda ('The Labor Battalion').

In 1921 Sadeh was a Haganah ('Defense') commander in Jerusalem. During the 1929 riots he took part in the battle defending the Jewish community in Haifa. When the 1936–1939 Arab revolt in Palestine began, Sadeh established the Nodedet ('Wandering Troop' or 'Patrol Unit') in Jerusalem, which confronted the Arabs in their villages and bases. He demanded that his troops "leave the defences" and initiate military operations.

In the summer of 1937, as commander of the Jewish Settlement Police, he founded the Posh (פו"ש), the commando arm of the Haganah. It was an elite strike force whose members were hand-picked by Sadeh.

Sadeh commanded the establishment of Kibbutz Hanita at an isolated spot on the ridge comprising the southwestern border of Lebanon. In 1941, he was instrumental in the founding of the Palmach (acronym for Plugot Mahatz, lit. 'Striking Companies'), the Haganah's enlisted military forces of volunteers. The purpose of this clandestine elite unit was to prepare to undertake a guerilla war in the event of the Axis powers entering Palestine. During the "200 days of dread", Sadeh worked on the Carmel Plan, which was a detailed strategy to withdraw the entire Jewish community in Palestine to Mount Carmel, forming a large enclave to withstand the invaders.

He was Commander of the Palmach until 1945, when he was appointed as the Haganah's Chief of the General Staff, and among other activities was in charge of the movement's operations against the British Forces during the remaining years of the British Mandate of Palestine and in Aliyah Bet operations that brought clandestine Jewish immigrants from post-WWII Europe to the country. He was also instrumental in founding the Gadna pre-military program in 1941 and became its first unofficial commander.

=== War of Independence ===
At the beginning of 1948, Sadeh was in command of the Haganah training camp at Mishmar HaEmek. In early April he successfully defended the kibbutz against a full-scale attack by the Arab Liberation Army (ALA). In the counter-attack that followed, his troops conquered a large section of the Jezreel Valley. At the end of April he commanded two brigades in a series of attacks on strategic areas in and around Jerusalem, Operation Yevusi.

During the truce in June he was responsible for establishing the first armored brigade of the newly established IDF. In July this brigade played an important part in Operation Danny, capturing Lod Airport, and in October, Operation Yoav, the taking of the Iraq Suwaydan fortress blocking the road to the Negev. In December 1948 he participated in Operation Horev in the Negev, when the forces under his command crossed the Egyptian border and threatened Arish as well as the Egyptian army in the Gaza Strip.

== Literary career ==
When the war of independence ended in 1949 and the Palmach was dismantled, Sadeh left military service. He wrote essays, stories, and plays. The book Misaviv Lamedura (Around the Bonfire) includes a collection of articles he wrote under the pen name Y. Noded (Y. Wanderer).

== Sports activism ==
Sadeh was a promoter and educator of Jewish sport. When in Russia he participated in wrestling meets and became the wrestling champion of St. Petersburg. As an active sportsperson he recognized physical education as having important cultural and educational values. As a member of the Hapoel ('The Worker') board he set policies and established guidelines and created the Hapoel motto, Alafim lo Alufim ('Thousands not champions'). Thousands of sportspeople and soldiers now take part in the Mount Tabor Race, devoted to Sadeh's ideals.

== Legacy and commemoration ==
- The Yitzhak Sadeh Prize for Military Literature is given annually in his honor.
- The Israel Postal Service issued a stamp commemorating Sadeh.
- The kibbutzim Nir Yitzhak and Mashabei Sadeh in the Negev are his namesakes, as is moshav Sde Yitzhak and numerous streets throughout Israel (often named Aluf Sadeh, literally "General Sadeh").
