= Igala =

Igala or IGALA may refer to:

- IGALA, the International Gender and Language Association, an interdisciplinary academic organization
- Igala Kingdom, a pre-colonial West African state
- Igala language, a Volta–Niger language
- Igala people, an ethnic group in Nigeria
- Igala Union, a former political party in Nigeria
- Volkswagen Igala, a compact car marketed in Nigeria, 1976–1980
