= Operation Assaf =

Israeli military operation against Egypt

Operation Assaf (Hebrew: מִבְצָע אָסָף, Mivtza Asaf) was an Israel Defense Forces (IDF) operation against the Egyptian Army between December 5–December 7, 1948, during the 1948 Arab–Israeli War. The successful operation's aim was to take control of the western Negev Desert. It was a small operation, executed between two larger operations in that theatre, Operation Yoav and Operation Horev.

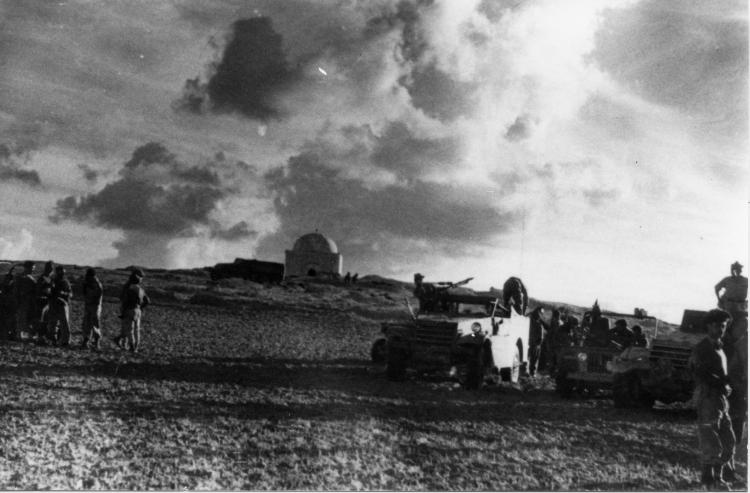
Sheikh Nuran following its occupation by the Israeli Army during Operation Assaf, December 1948

== Background ==
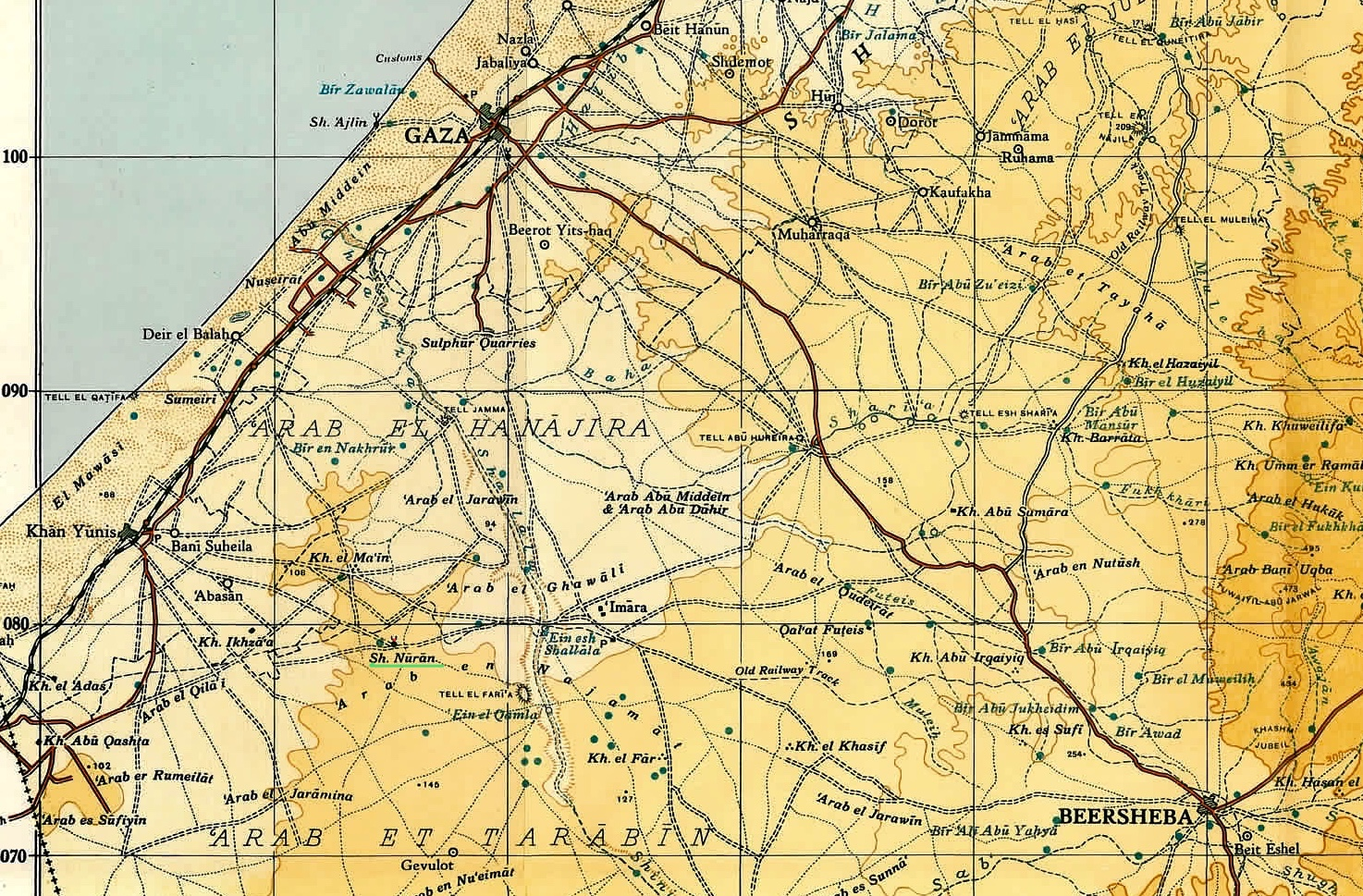
Sheikh Nuran, 1945

Following Operation Yoav, the Egyptian Army tried to stabilize a defensive line between its two arms of controlled territory in the Negev, along the Beer Sheva-Gaza road. With international peace-efforts intensifying, both sides felt that the war was drawing to a close, and such a strong defensive line would help Egypt claim the majority of western and southern Negev, which included some Israeli settlements.

Israel wished to disconnect the two Egyptian arms before it could construct and man strong fortifications along the new defense line. So, Operation Assaf was planned and carried out starting December 5, just two weeks after Operation Yoav ended. In order to surprise the defenders, IDF units were transported via the newly captured Beer Sheva to the Egyptian Army's southern (rear) flank, and attacked northwards (the Egyptians expected attacks from the north and east).

== Participating forces ==
The operation was carried out mainly with the Golani Brigade's Gideon Battalion infantry forces, for whom this was the first operation in southern Israel or in flat desert terrain (Golani was normally stationed in the lush and hilly Upper Galilee region, near the Golan Heights for which it is named). In addition, the assault battalion and several armoured personnel carriers from the armored battalion, both of the 8th Armored Brigade, participated in combat. A few artillery and mortar batteries assisted them.

The main assaults were carried out by the mechanized forces, while Golani's infantry came in the second wave to cleanse and defend newly captured positions.

== Operational phases ==
Phase 1, went according to plan, with IDF forces capturing three important Egyptian positions without major combat or casualties, on the operation's first day (December 5, 1948).

Phase 2, carried out on the following day (December 6, 1948) captured another important position, thus completing all the operation's objectives. However, the Israelis met stronger resistance at another position (which was not captured) and were forced to stop their advance when they hit a minefield in another location.

On the same day, the Egyptians counter-attacked the captured positions from their main positions in the west, with an infantry battalion, a tank company and some accurate artillery. The attack came very close to breaking the Israeli defenders, but broke off at dusk. Later data indicated that this was the Egyptian tank battalion's first combat action, after having arrived from Egypt barely two weeks earlier. It had lost 5 of its 12 attacking tanks on that day (number of casualties unknown); Five Israelis were killed in the counter-attack and 28 were wounded.

The Egyptians made preparations to continue the counter-attack on the afternoon of the following day (December 7). However, Israeli Air Force reconnaissance revealed the Egyptian preparations in the morning. The Israeli assault battalion was sent to the Egyptian's north (left) flank and stormed their forces southwards, then chased the retreating Egyptians westward, eventually stopping in face of strong anti-tank Egyptian positions. It was reported that a hundred Egyptian soldiers were left dead in the wake of the assault; the Israelis had 2 wounded and none killed.

During the next week, the Israeli forces cleared the area's minefields, dug defensive fortifications, and harassed nearby Egyptian forces, before being pulled out of the region in preparations for Operation Horev.

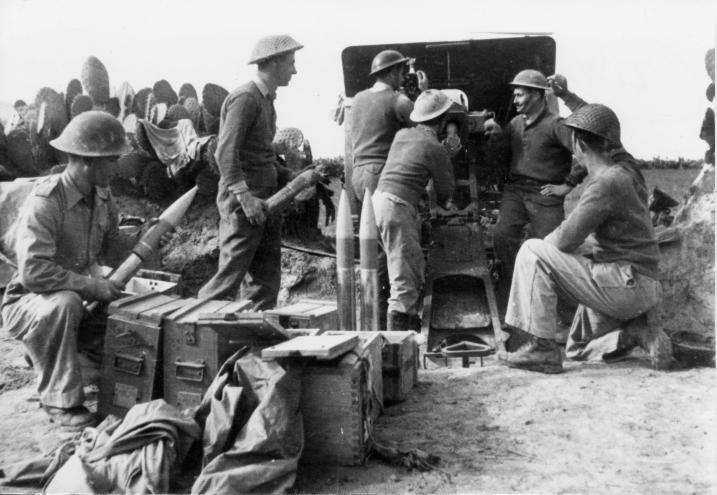
Israeli army artillery in action during Operation Assaf

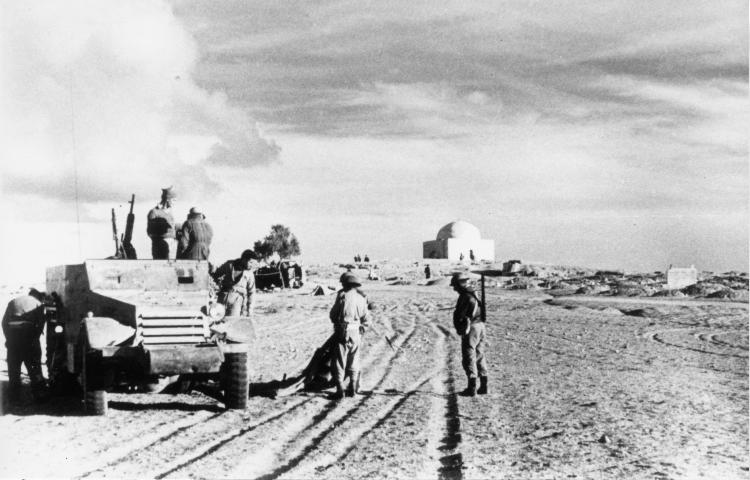
Operation Assaf - Sheikh Nuran

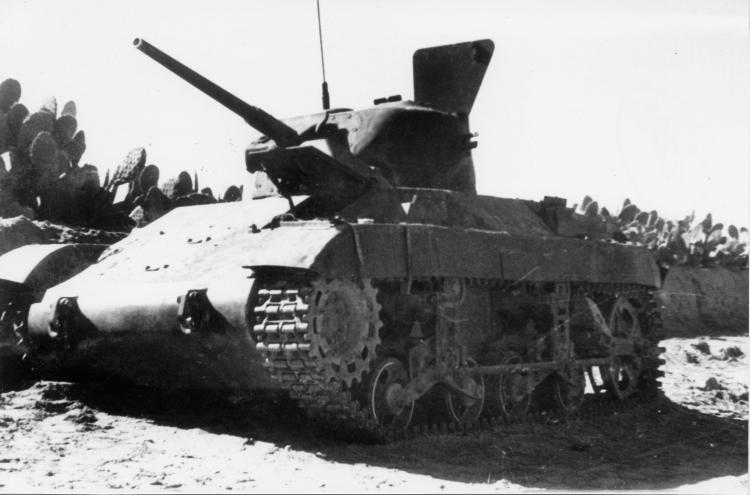
Operation Assaf. Damaged Egyptian tank.

== See also ==
- List of battles and operations in the 1948 Palestine war
