= Meitar (law firm) =

Israeli law firm

- Headquarters: Ramat Gan, Israel
- No. of attorneys: 537
- Website: meitar.com/en

Meitar (Hebrew: מיתר) is an Israeli law firm.

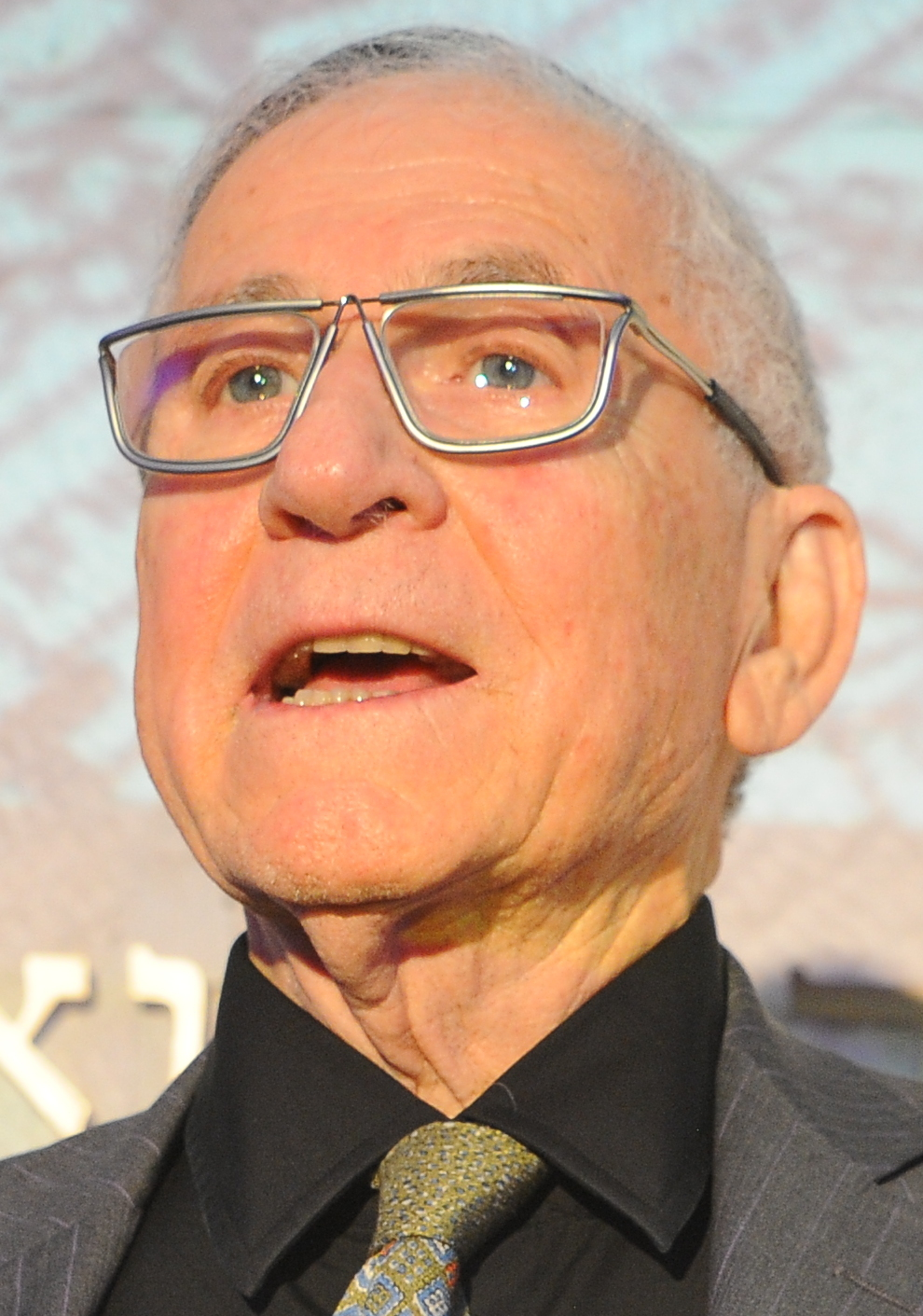
Zvi Meitar (1933–2015), the founder of Meitar

== Background ==
Meitar employs 537 lawyers, making it the largest law firm in Israel by number of lawyers.

In September 2025, Meitar entered negotiations with Arnon, Tadmor-Levy regarding a merger, but these were called off in October 2025.
