= Yigal Arnon =

Israeli lawyer

- יגאל ארנון
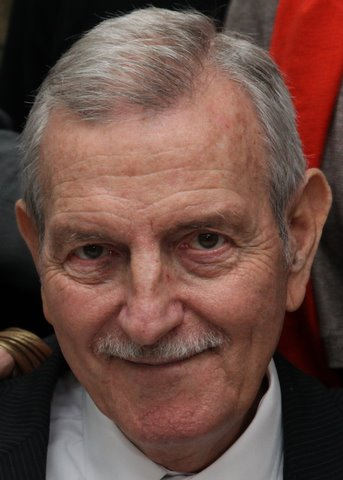
- Born: December 9, 1929; Israel
- Died: April 27, 2014 (aged 84)
- Education: Hebrew University of Jerusalem
- Occupation: Lawyer
- Known for: Founder of Yigal Arnon & Co.

Yigal Arnon (Hebrew: יגאל ארנון; December 9, 1929 – April 27, 2014) was an Israeli lawyer and founder of Yigal Arnon & Co.

== Biography ==
Yigal Arnon received his LL.M. degree from the Hebrew University of Jerusalem in 1953, and was admitted to the Israel Bar in 1954. On the Israeli Friends of the Hebrew University of Jerusalem web site, he is described as one of the leading jurists in Israel.

== Legal career ==
He served as the chairman of the First International Bank of Israel, the fifth largest bank in Israel, between 1987 and 2000, followed by becoming Chairman of F.I.B.I Holdings Ltd.; chairman of the Board of Governors of the Hebrew University; and Chairman of Arkia Israel Airlines, the second largest airliner in Israel, of which he was reported to own almost 20%.

Arnon was known to represent the Safra brothers' Israeli interests and has represented Ehud Olmert and Aryeh Deri in the past.
