= 8th Armored Brigade (Israel) =

Israeli military unit

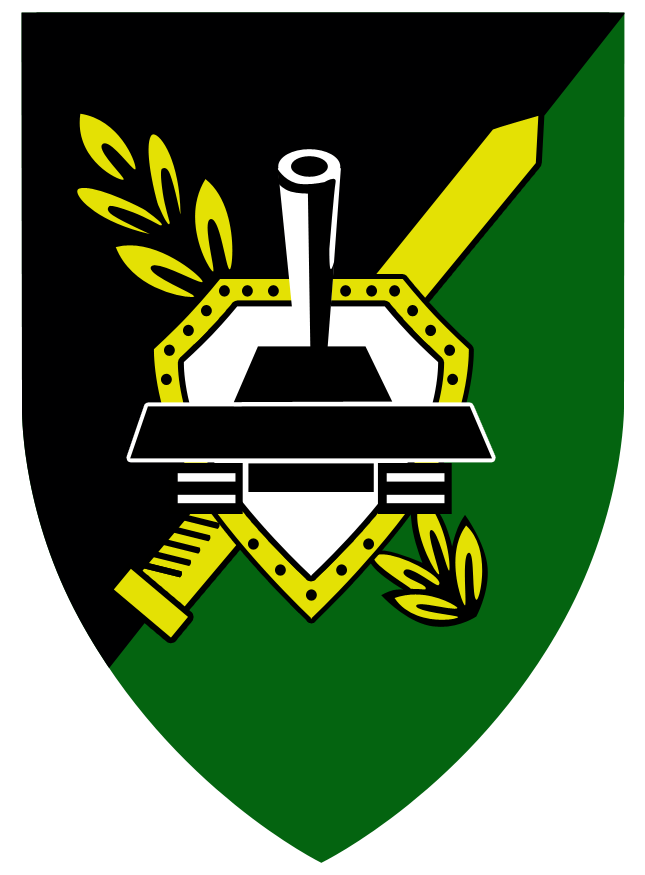
- Brigade insignia
- Active: 1948–present
- Country: Israel
- Allegiance: Israel Defense Forces
- Type: Reserves
- Size: Brigade
- Engagements: 1948 Arab–Israeli War; Operation Danny; Operation Yoav; Operation Assaf; Operation Horev; Six-Day War; Yom Kippur War; 1982 Lebanon War; First Intifada; Second Intifada; 2014 Gaza War; Gaza war; 2024 Israeli invasion of Lebanon

The 8th Armored Brigade (Hebrew: חטיבה שמונה, Hativa Shmoneh) is an Israel Defense Forces reserve armored brigade assigned to the 91st Division. It was the Israel Defense Forces' first armoured brigade which possessed tanks, jeeps and armoured personnel carriers (APCs), whereas all other IDF units at the time were entirely infantry-based.

The brigade was called 'armoured' for morale reasons, although in reality it only had a single tank company (later in the war, two companies), and a single APC company (these companies became the brigade's armoured battalion), and an assault battalion composed of jeeps.

The Brigade's first commander was Yitzhak Sadeh.

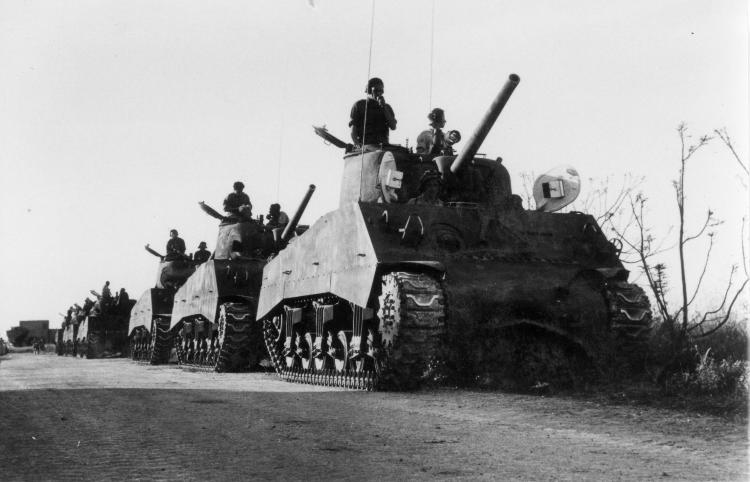
8th Armoured Brigade, 1948

== Organization ==
- 8th Armored Brigade "HaZaken/The Old One" (Reserve)
  - 89th Armored Battalion
  - 121st Armored Battalion
  - 129th Armored Battalion
  - 5508th Logistic Battalion
  - Reconnaissance Company
  - 760th Signal Company

== History ==
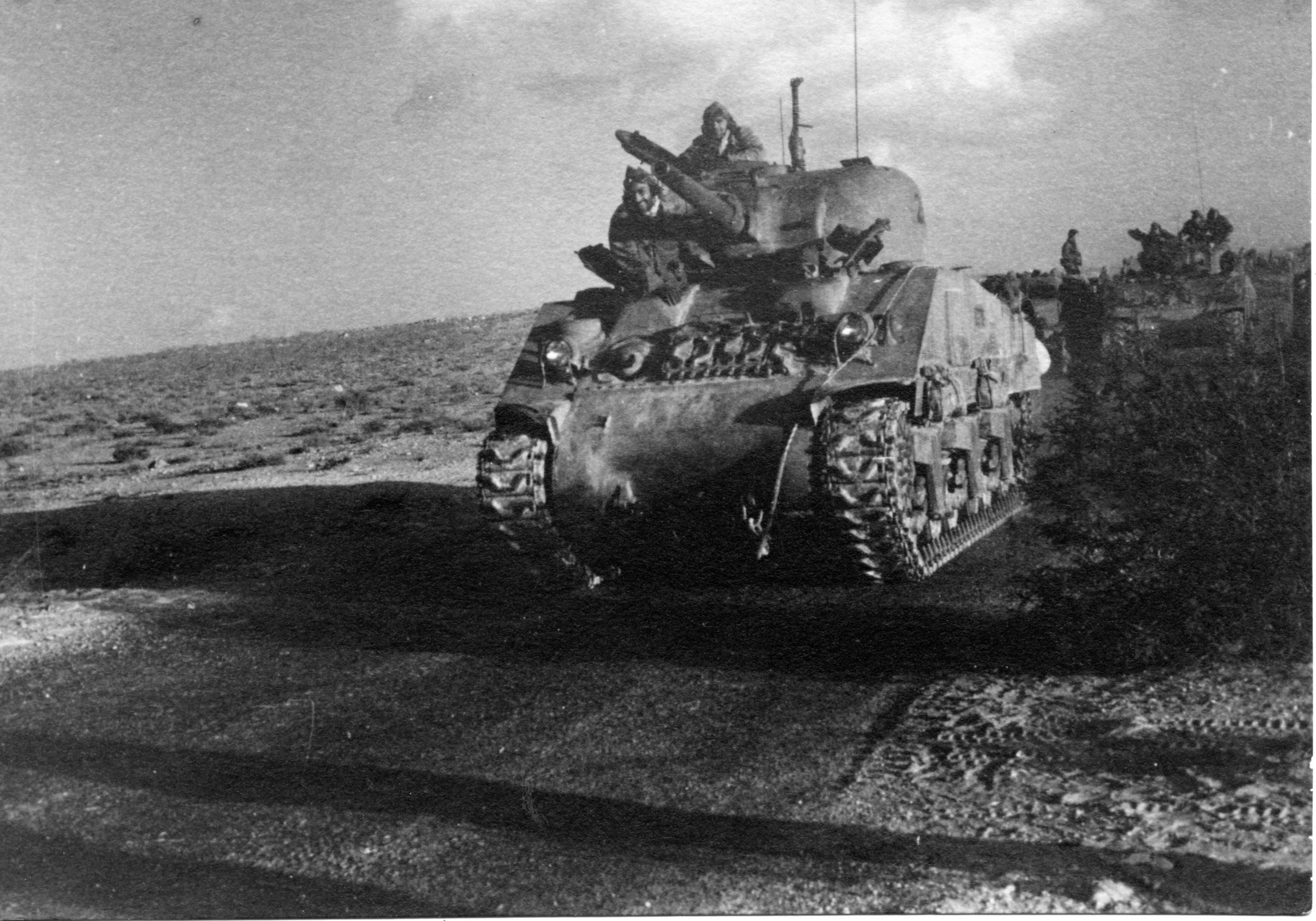
Palmach M4 Sherman tank leading a convoy

=== Founding and organization ===
The brigade was founded and subordinated to Yitzhak Sadeh on May 24, 1948. Two battalions were created—the 82nd Tank Battalion under Felix Biatus, and the 89th Commando Battalion under Moshe Dayan. Another battalion, the 88th, was founded later.

According to Dayan, the 89th consisted of four companies each made up of different groups: from kibbutz and moshav members, from Tel Aviv, from Lehi, and veterans from South Africa. The battalion consisted entirely of volunteers: "A" company consisted of men from the disbanded Lehi underground organisation; "B" company was taken from the 43rd Battalion, Kiryati Brigade; "C" company from the Golani Brigade. Many of the men joined after personal approaches from Dayan, to the annoyance of their commanding officers. They were stationed at Tel Litvinsky. Their first action was against Irgun members landing arms from the Altalena at Kfar Vitkin, 23 miles north of Tel Aviv. The Alexandroni Brigade was "reluctant" to intervene, and Dayan was unable to deploy ex-members of Irgun from his battalion.

=== 1948 Arab–Israeli War ===
On 11 July 1948, the 89th Battalion was involved in the attack on Lydda. Later that month, Dayan became the commander of the Jerusalem front and was replaced by Dov Chesis. On 28 October the 89th Battalion, now under Chesis, captured the town of al-Dawayima.

Among others, the brigade participated in Operation Danny, Operation Yoav, Operation Assaf and Operation Horev.

=== After the 1948 Arab–Israeli War ===
Following the 1948 war, the brigade served as the backbone of the IDF's armoured forces. In the Six-Day War, the brigade fought on two fronts, including in the Sinai and the Golan Heights. In the Yom Kippur War, the brigade fought in the Sinai. In the 1982 Lebanon War, the brigade was mobilized but did not take part in the fighting.

A memorial to the 8th Brigade is located adjacent to the Ben Gurion International Airport.

== See also ==
- List of battles and operations in the 1948 Palestine war
- Al-Dawayima massacre
