= Operation Horev =

1948–49 Israeli offensive against Egypt

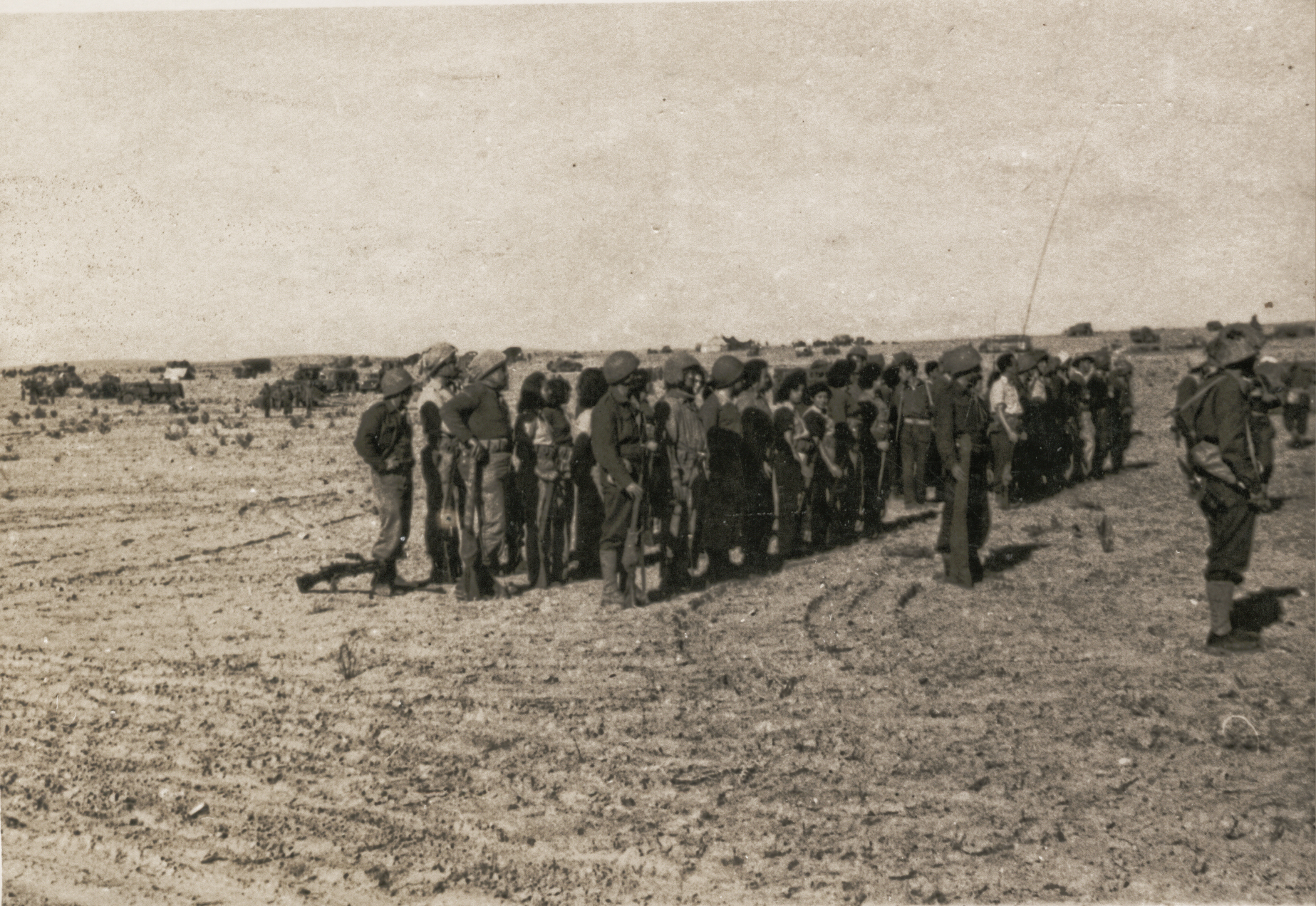
Commander of the pioneering departure in Operation Horev

Operation Horev was a large-scale offensive against the Egyptian army in the Western Negev towards the end of the Arab–Israeli War in 1948 and 1949. Its objective was to entrap the Egyptian Army in the Gaza Strip. The operation took place from 22 December 1948 to 7 January 1949 and concluded after Britain threatened to intervene unless Israeli troops immediately withdrew from Egyptian territory.

Horev refers to Mount Sinai in the Scriptures, where the Israelites encamped for a year (see Exodus 3:1 and Psalms 106:19). It is contemporarily known as Jebel Musa ("Mount of Moses" in Arabic).

== Objectives ==
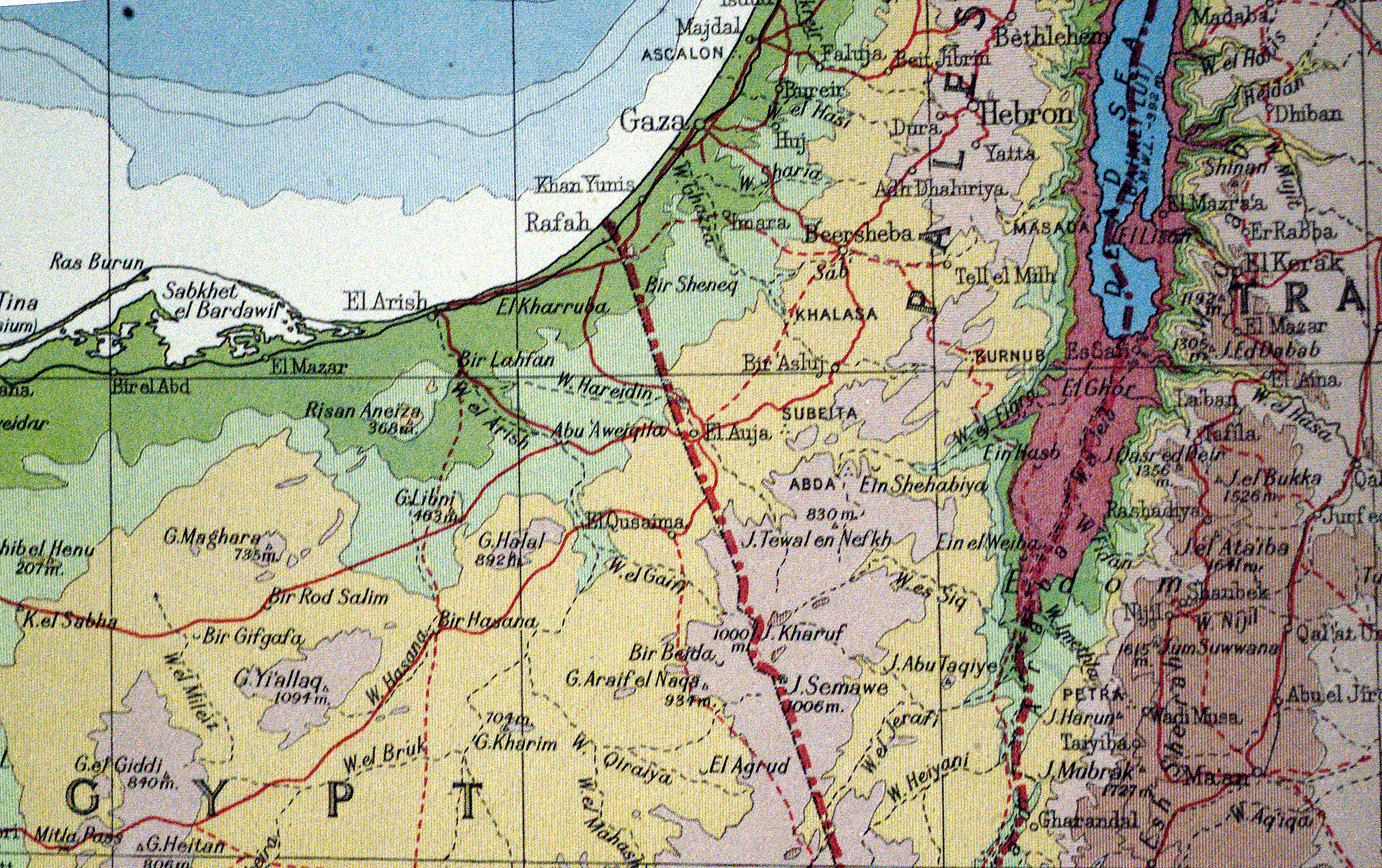
al Auja with roads to Rafah and el Arish

The primary objective of the offensive was to engage the Egyptian army units defending al-Auja on the Palestinian-Egyptian border. The major thrust was then directed towards the Egyptian army bases at El-Arish, intending to trap the majority of the Egyptian army in the Gaza Strip.

Commanding the operation was Yigal Alon, and involved five Israeli brigades: The 8th Armoured Brigade, commanded by Yitzhak Sadeh; the Negev Brigade; the Golani Brigade; the Harel Brigade; and the Alexandroni Brigade. They aimed to maintain the siege of the 4,000-strong Egyptian brigade at Faluja. Additionally, the Egyptians had two more brigades in the Gaza area and one near El-Arish across the border.

== Campaign ==
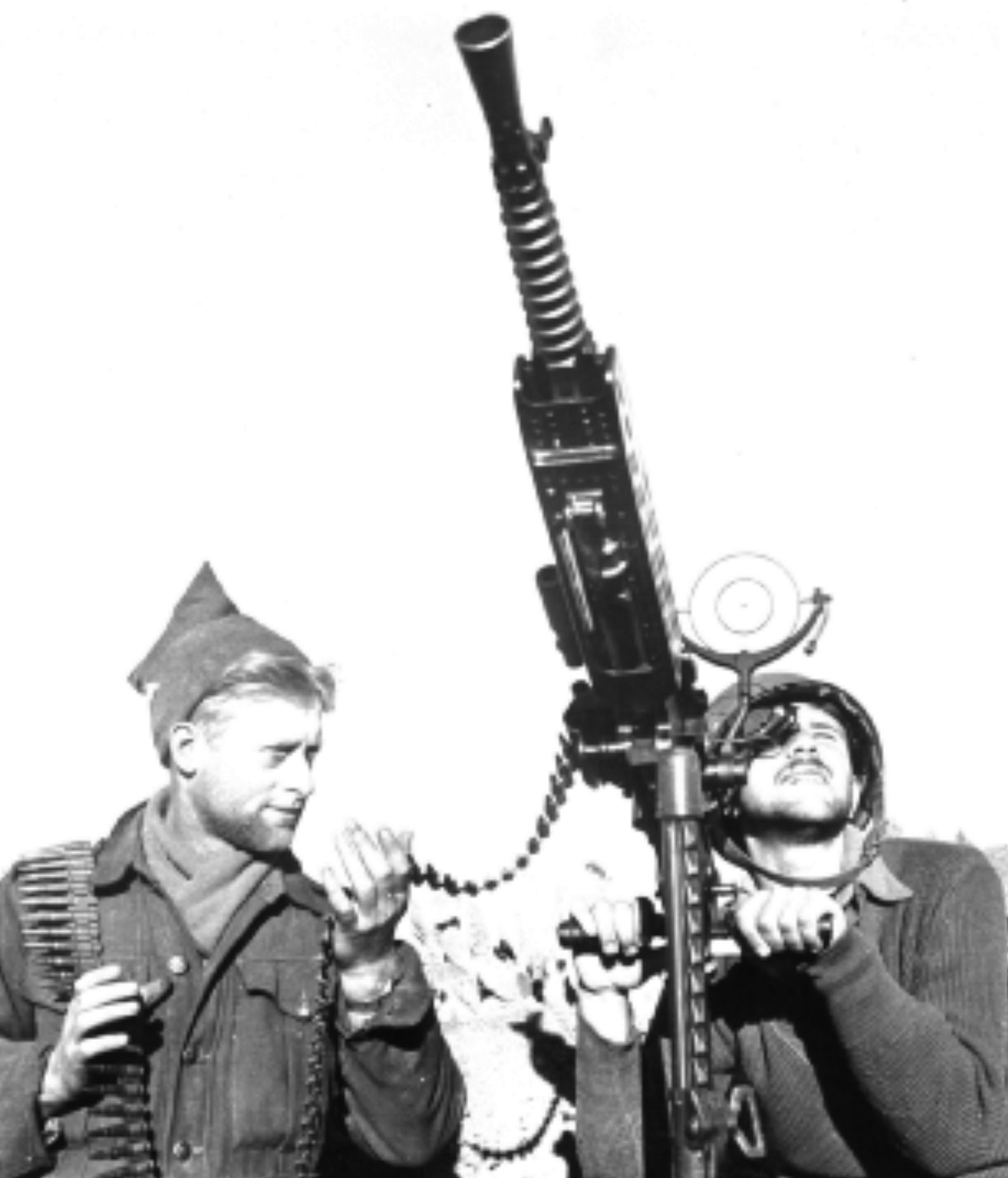
An Israeli machine gun post during Operation Horev

On 22 December, a battalion from the Golani Brigade (transported by Shayetet 11) launched a diversionary attack on positions near the Gaza-Rafah road. In preparation for the offensive, the Israeli army had cleared a route through the desert, bypassing defenses on the Beersheba to al-Auja road. The 8th Armoured Brigade attacked al-Auja from this unexpected quarter on 27 December 1948. After 24 hours of combat, the Egyptians surrendered in disarray. Following this victory, Alon anticipated no significant Egyptian defenses west of El-Arish and prepared to seize the entire Sinai peninsula. The Negev Brigade, following the 8th Brigade's tanks, crossed the Egyptian border on the night of 28 December and progressed towards El-Arish. By 30 December 1948, they had reached the outskirts of the town's airfield, while units from the Harel Brigade moved further west into Sinai. On 29 December, the United Nations Security Council ordered a ceasefire.

== Outcome ==
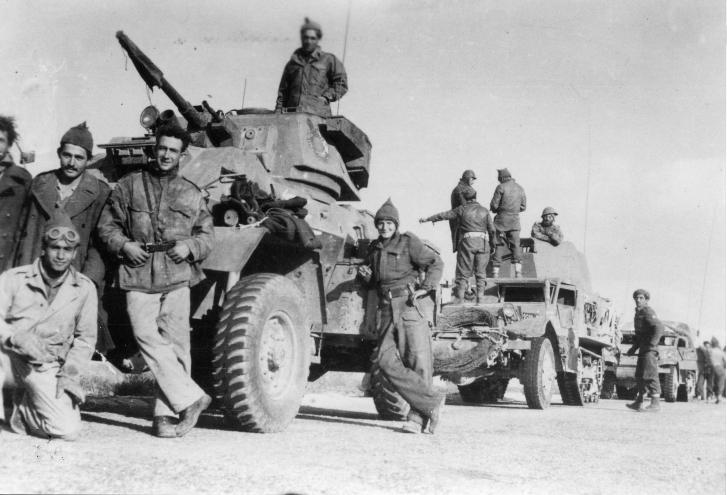
Negev Brigade during Operation Horev

Before achieving his objective, Allon was ordered by Israeli Prime Minister David Ben-Gurion to withdraw from Egypt immediately due to threats from the British Government of invoking the 1936 Anglo-Egyptian Treaty of Friendship and becoming directly involved. Despite protests, but adhering to Ben-Gurion's directive, the Israelis withdrew. On 3 January, they launched an attack on the Egyptian defenses at Rafah, with the same objective of trapping the Egyptian army. After three days of conflict around Rafah, the Egyptian government announced its willingness to enter armistice negotiations on 6 January 1949. On the same day, the Israeli Air Force shot down five RAF Spitfires on patrol in the area, killing two pilots and taking two more prisoners. The British relocated reinforcements to Akaba. Despite protests from the army, Israel accepted the ceasefire on 7 January.

In the concluding Armistice Agreement, al-Auja was designated a demilitarized zone.

== See also ==
- Battles of the Sinai (1948)
