= Yigal Allon =

Israeli general and politician (1918–1980)

- יגאל אלון
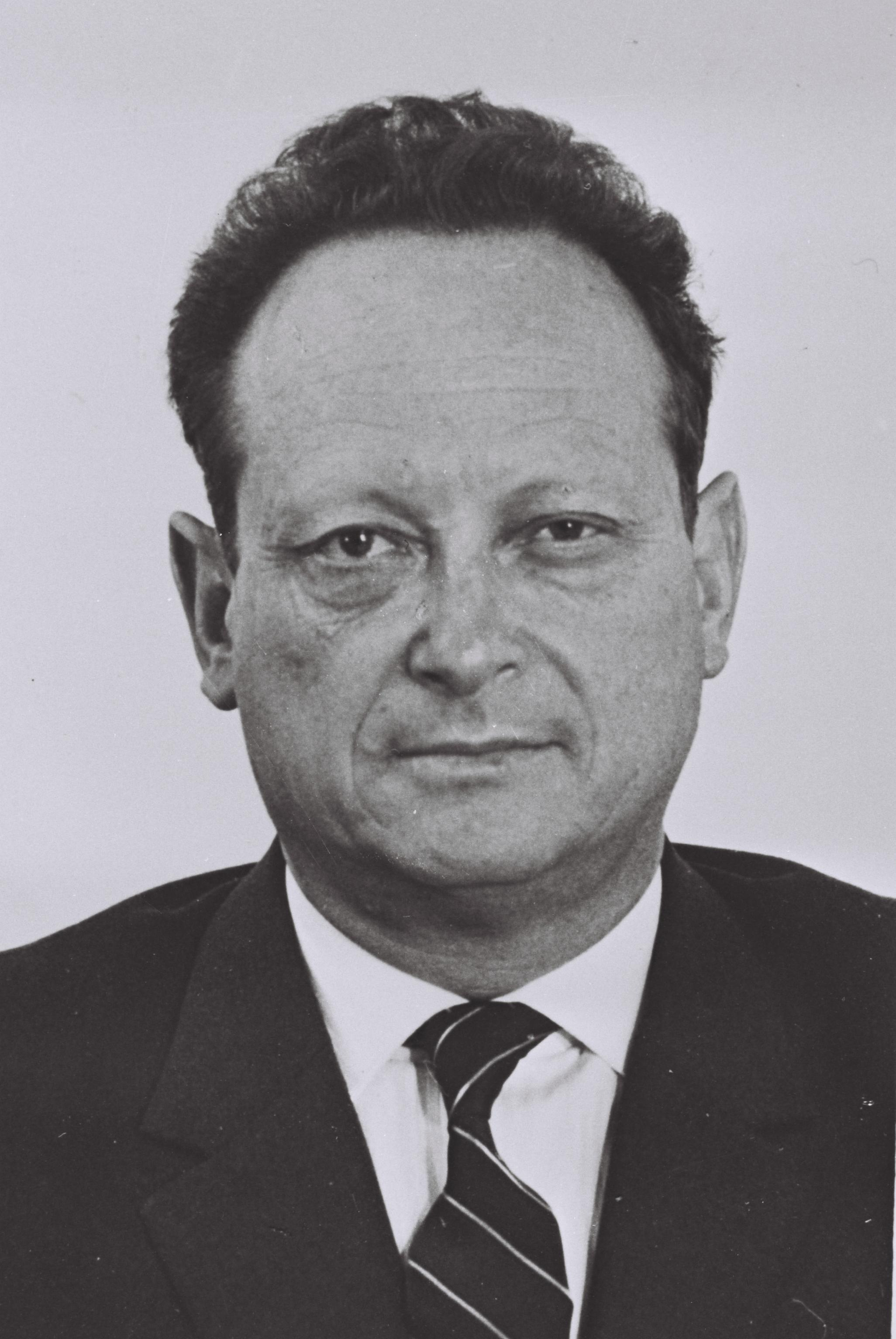
- Allon in 1969

Interim Prime Minister of Israel
- In office 26 February 1969 – 17 March 1969
- President: Zalman Shazar
- Preceded by: Levi Eshkol
- Succeeded by: Golda Meir

Deputy Prime Minister of Israel
- In office 1 July 1968 – 10 March 1974
- Prime Minister: Levi Eshkol; Golda Meir
- Preceded by: Abba Eban
- Succeeded by: Simha Erlich; Yigael Yadin

Ministerial portfolios
- 1961–1968: Labour
- 1968–1969: Immigrant Absorption
- 1969–1974: Education and Culture
- 1974–1977: Minister of Foreign Affairs

Faction represented in the Knesset
- 1955–1965: Ahdut HaAvoda
- 1965–1968: Alignment
- 1968–1969: Labor Party
- 1969–1980: Alignment

Personal details
- Born: 10 October 1918 Kfar Tavor, Occupied Enemy Territory Administration
- Died: 29 February 1980 (aged 61) Afula, Israel
- Spouse: Ruth Episdorf
- Children: 3
- Education: Kadoorie Agricultural High School; St Antony's College, Oxford

Yigal Allon (Hebrew: יגאל אלון; 10 October 1918 – 29 February 1980) was an Israeli military leader and politician. He was a commander of the Palmach and a general in the Israeli Defense Forces (IDF). He was also a leader of the Ahdut HaAvoda and Israeli Labor parties. He served briefly as acting Prime Minister of Israel between the death of Levi Eshkol and the appointment of Golda Meir in 1969. Allon was the first non-European-born Israeli to serve as Prime Minister of Israel (the first elected, non-European-born Prime Minister would later be Yitzhak Rabin in 1974). He was a government minister from the third Knesset to the ninth inclusive.

Born a child of pioneer settlers in the Lower Galilee, Allon initially rose to prominence through his military career. After the outbreak of the 1936–1939 Arab revolt in Palestine, he joined the Haganah and later the Palmach. He commanded a squad and organized key operations in the Jewish Resistance Movement such as the Night of the Bridges. During the 1947–1949 Palestine war, Allon commanded the conquest of the Galilee, Lod and Ramla, as well as the entire Negev up to Eilat as Head of the Southern Command.

Allon entered politics after a forced relief from command by then-Premier David Ben-Gurion. During his political career, he served as foreign and education minister, deputy prime minister, and briefly as acting prime minister. He was one of the architects of the creation of the Labor Party, advocating for the merger of Ahdut HaAvoda with Mapai.

In 1967, he devised the eponymous Allon Plan, which proposed next steps for Israel after the Six-Day War. While the plan was not officially adopted, it served as a guideline for the next decade of Israeli settlement. He also took part in the Sinai Interim Agreement in 1975.

In 1980, Allon died unexpectedly of cardiac arrest while campaigning for the leadership of the Labor Party.

== Early years (1918–1931) ==
Yigal Peikowitz (later Allon) was born on 10 October 1918 in Kfar Tavor, then a part of the Occupied Enemy Territory Administration. His father, Reuven, immigrated to Palestine in 1890 along with his father and elder brother from Belarus, then a part of the Russian Empire. His mother, Haia Shortz-Peikowitz, came from a Jewish family in Safed. Her father was a founding member of Rosh Pinna.

Reuven originally planned to name his son "Yigael", meaning "he will be redeemed", but decided the name was too passive and instead chose "Yigal", which means "he will redeem."

When Allon was five years old, his mother died, and his older brothers left home. As the youngest child, he remained with his father. Kfar Tavor was an isolated area that experienced frequent raids and thefts by neighboring Arab and Bedouin communities. After his bar mitzvah at age 13, Allon was given a gun by his father to protect the family crops from thieves.

In 1934, at the age of 16, Allon enrolled at the Kadoorie Agricultural High School. He found his education lacking compared to his urban peers, and his teachers encouraged him to improve. In his autobiography, he wrote about the school director's influence on his social values.

During school, Allon became a Labor Zionist. After graduating in 1937, Allon and a group of Labor Zionists established Kibbutz Ginosar on land leased to the settlement of Migdal by the Palestine Jewish Colonization Association. There, he became known as a local leader and formed a friendship with Berl Katznelson.

== Military career (1931–1950) ==
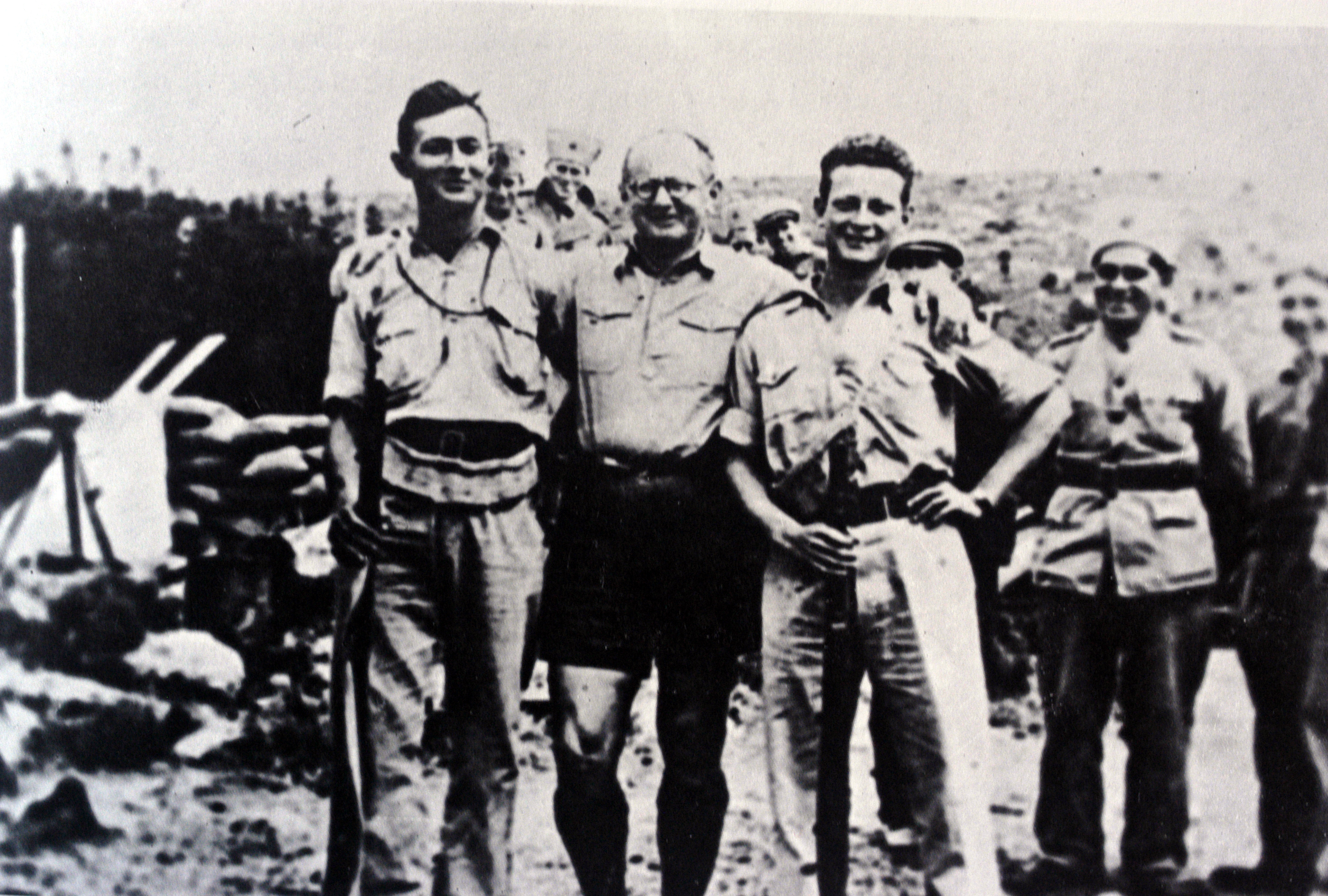
L-R: Moshe Dayan, Yitzhak Sadeh, Yigal Allon, at Kibbutz Hanita (1938)

Allon joined the Haganah in 1931 and later commanded a field unit and a mobile patrol in northern Palestine during the 1936–1939 Arab revolt in Palestine.

While working in the fields of the kibbutz during the revolt, Allon was summoned by Yitzhak Sadeh to take a command position in the Haganah. After completing a squad command course, he was appointed to lead the Mobile Guards. In this role, he participated in the expulsion of Arabs who brought their flocks onto Jewish fields and became known for planning ambushes against infiltrating gangs.

During this time, Allon also took part in operations with the Special Night Squads (SNS) under the command of Orde Wingate and Bala Bredin. In 1941, he became one of the founding members of the Palmach. From 1941 to 1942, he served as a scout with British forces in Syria and Lebanon.

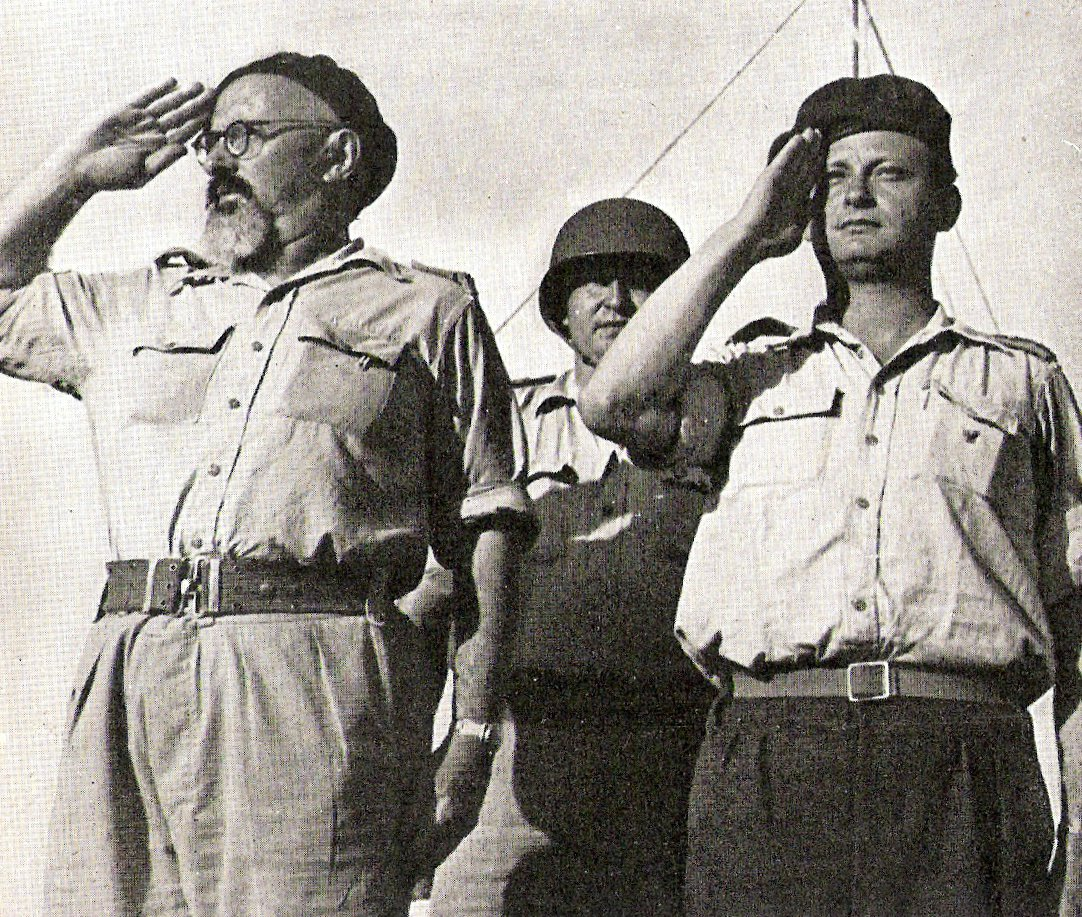
Yitzhak Sadeh (left) and Yigal Allon, 1948

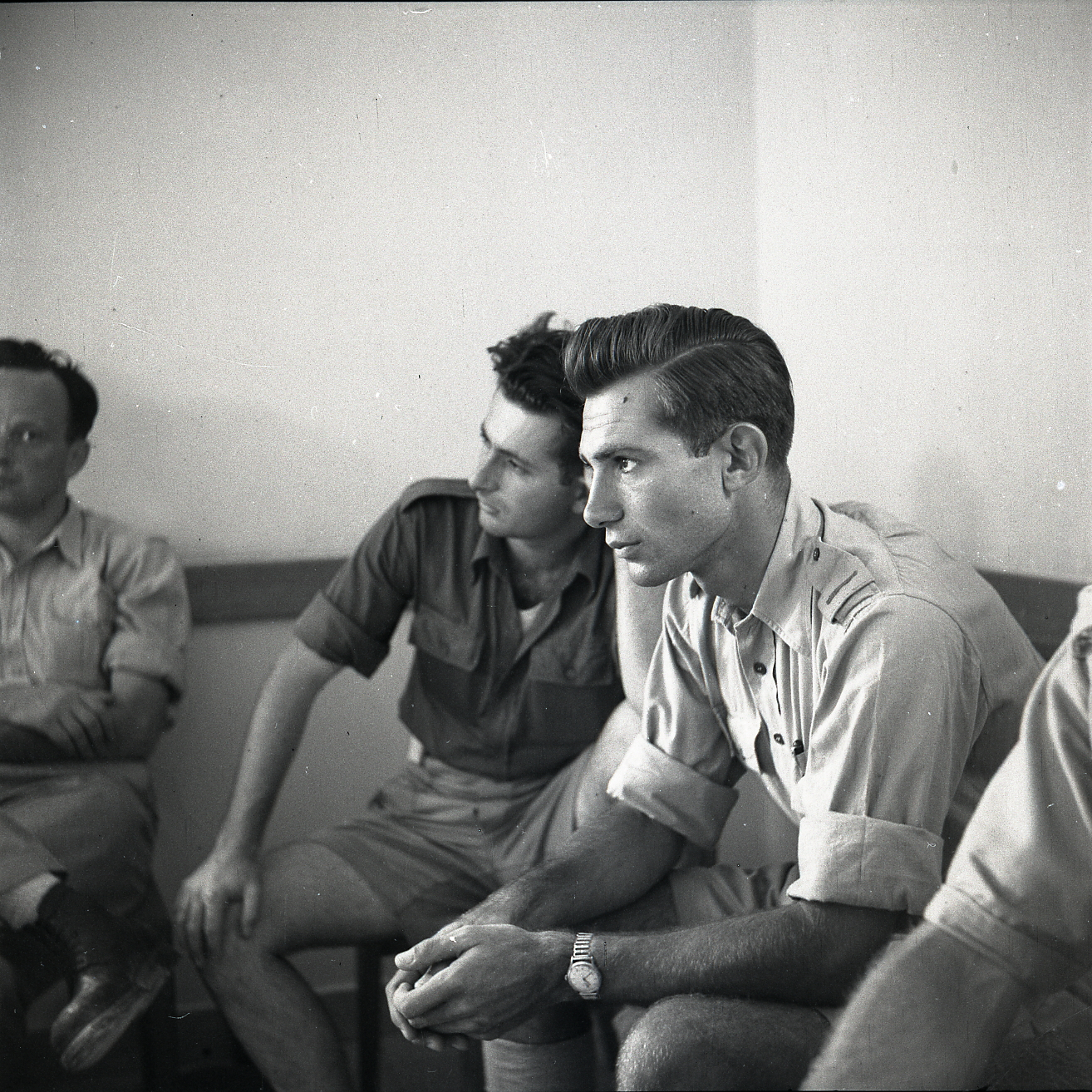
Allon in 1948

In 1945, Allon became Commander in Chief of the Palmach. On June 22, 1948, during David Ben-Gurion's confrontation with the Irgun over the distribution of weapons from the Altalena, Allon commanded the troops ordered to shell the vessel. During the 1948 Arab–Israeli War, he led major operations across three fronts, including Operation Yiftach in the Galilee, Operation Dani in the central region, and Operations Yoav and Horev in the Negev.

Allon's final major military roles as commander were in October and December 1948: Operation Yoav toward the Hebron Hills and Operation Horev along the southern Egyptian front. As Operational Commander of the Southern Command, Allon was responsible for security along the borders with Egypt and parts of Jordan. On June 4, 1949, he declared an 8 kilometres (5 mi) wide closed military zone along the border.

Allon's successes in the war are often credited to his intuition and foresight, though these traits sometimes led to military failures.

On October 18, 1949, during an official visit to Paris, Allon was informed by his French hosts that Ben-Gurion had decided to replace him with Moshe Dayan as Operational Commander. Many of Allon's staff officers resigned in protest. Allon retired from active service in 1950.

== Political career (1950–1980) ==
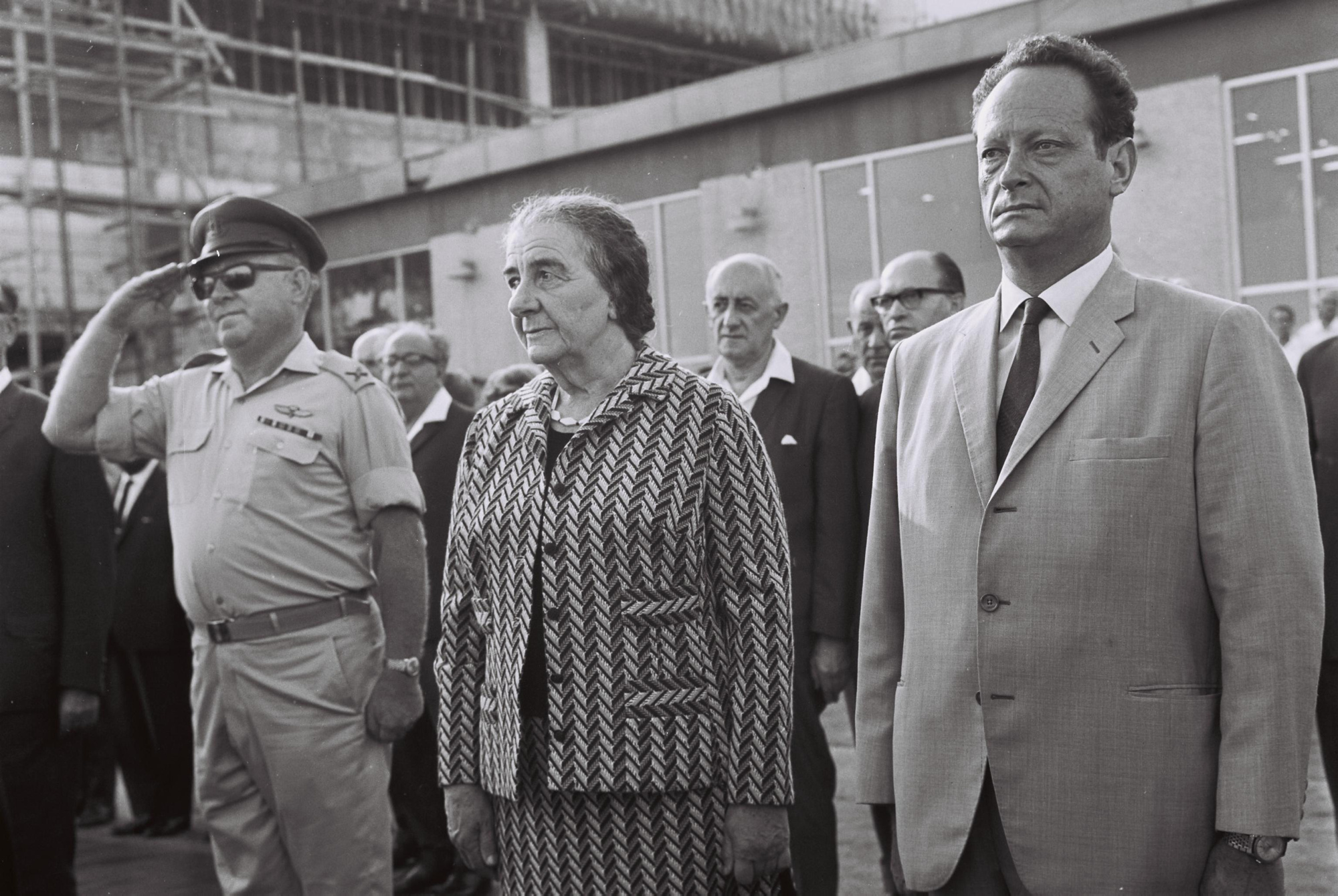
Allon (right) with Golda Meir, 1969.

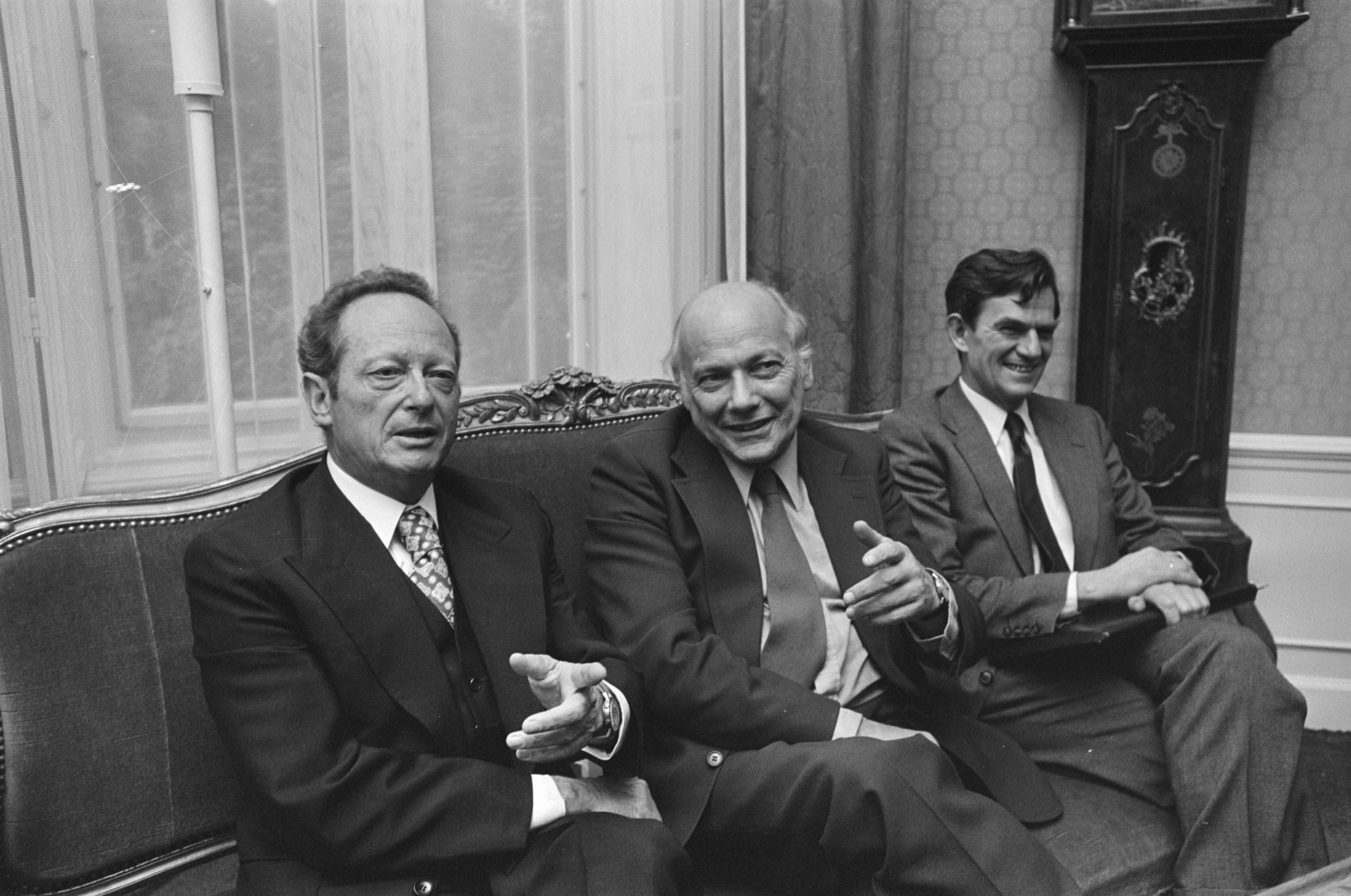
Foreign Minister Allon sitting with Joop den Uyl, Prime Minister of the Netherlands.

In January 1948, Allon helped form the Mapam party. Prime Minister Ben-Gurion, leader of the rival governing Mapai party, told Allon to dissociate himself from Mapam, considering it too left-wing and a potential threat to the State of Israel's security. In December 1948, Mapam co-leader Meir Ya'ari criticized Allon's use of tens of thousands of Palestinian refugees for strategic purposes.

From 1950 to 1952, Allon studied philosophy and history at St Antony's College, Oxford.

After concluding his military career, Allon entered public politics. He became a key figure in Ahdut HaAvoda, which had split from Mapam in 1954, and was first elected to the Knesset in 1955, where he served until his death. He was a member of the Economic Affairs Committee, Constitution, Law and Justice Committee, Education and Culture Committee, Joint Committee on the Motion for the Agenda Regarding Sports in Israel, and the Foreign Affairs and Defense Committee.

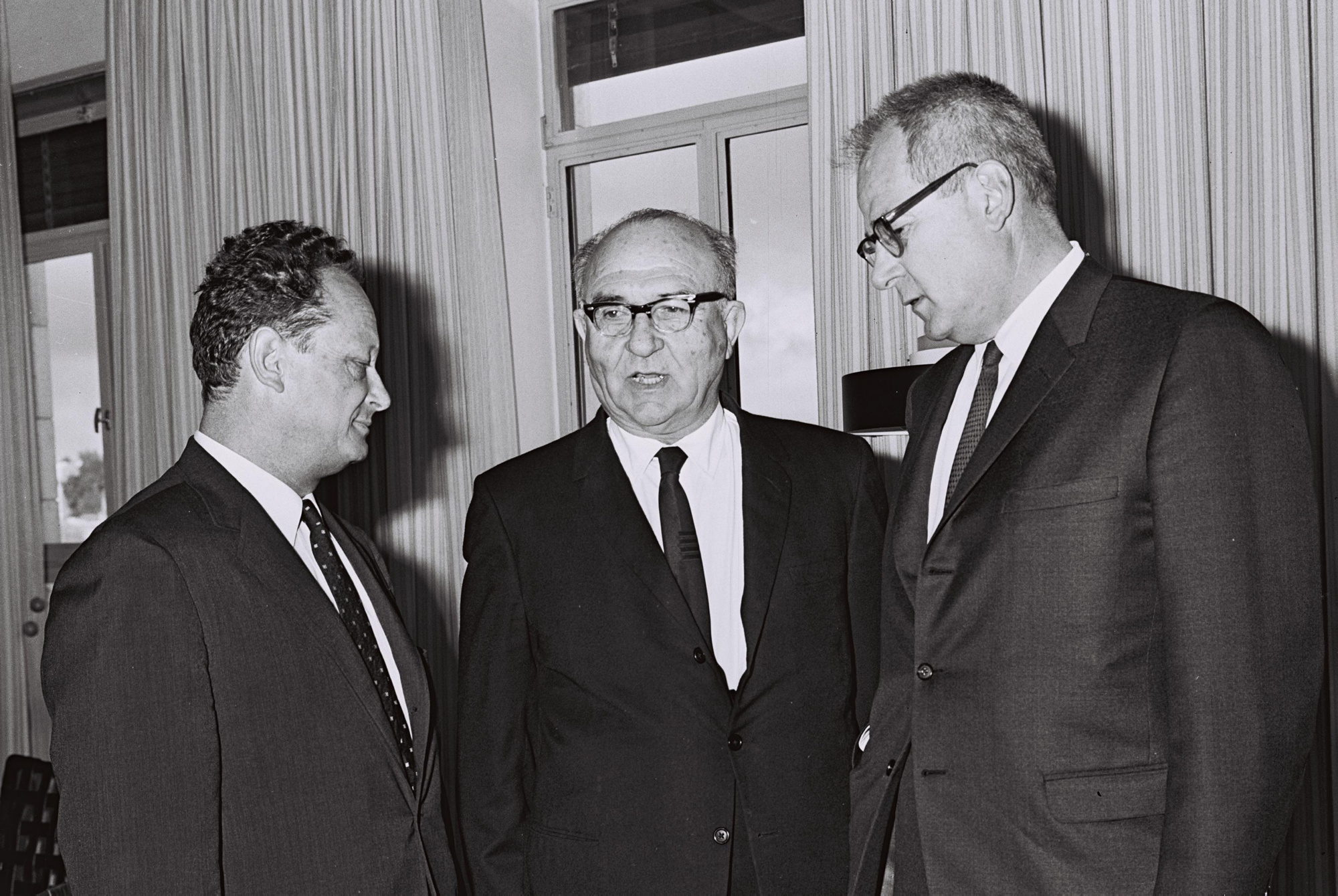
Right to Left: U.S. Secretary of Labor, William Willard Wirtz, Israeli Prime Minister, Levi Eshkol and Israeli Minister of Labor, Yigal Allon.

Allon served as Israel's Labor Minister from 1961 to 1968, where he focused on improving the state employment service, expanding the road network, and promoting labor relations legislation. From 1968 to 1969, he held the positions of Deputy Prime Minister and Minister of Immigrant Absorption.

Following the death of Prime Minister Levi Eshkol on February 26, 1969, Allon briefly served as interim Prime Minister until March 17, 1969, when Golda Meir was elected leader of the Labor Party and became Prime Minister. In Meir's government, Allon served as Deputy Prime Minister and Minister of Education and Culture, a role he held until 1974.

During the September 1970 crisis in Jordan, Allon supported aiding King Hussein against the Palestine Liberation Organization. In 1974, he participated in negotiations related to the Separation of Forces Agreement,

In 1974, Allon was appointed Minister of Foreign Affairs, a position he held until 1977. At the time of his sudden death in 1980, he was a candidate for the leadership of the Alignment, challenging the incumbent leader, Shimon Peres.

=== Allon Plan (1967) ===
Allon was the architect of the Allon Plan, a proposal for a partial Israeli withdrawal from the West Bank after the Six-Day War, aiming to facilitate a negotiated partition of the territory. The plan was presented to the cabinet in July 1967. Although it was never formally adopted, the Allon Plan influenced Israeli settlement policies in the following decade.

According to the plan, Israel would retain approximately one-third of the West Bank, focusing on the Jordan Valley, where a strip of settlements and military installations would be established. The heavily populated mountain ridge to the west of the Jordan Valley, populated by Palestinians, was envisioned as part of a confederation with Jordan. Additional areas, including land flanking the Jericho-Jerusalem road, Gush Etzion, and parts of the Hebron Hills, were to be annexed to Israel. Minor territorial adjustments were proposed along the Green Line, particularly near Latrun.

The plan also included proposals for the development of Jewish neighborhoods in East Jerusalem, the rehabilitation of the Jewish Quarter in the Old City, and the annexation of the Gaza Strip, accompanied by the relocation of its Palestinian population to other areas.

== Death and legacy ==
Allon died of heart failure in Afula on 29 February 1980. He was buried in the cemetery of Kibbutz Ginosar in the Northern District on the shore of the Sea of Galilee. The funeral was attended by tens of thousands of mourners, with condolences extended by many world leaders, including Egyptian president Anwar Sadat.

=== Legacy ===
Explaining the growing admiration for Yigal Allon three decades after his death, Oren Dagan of the Society for the Preservation of Israel Heritage Sites said, "people wish to live in the kind of state Yigal Allon dreamed of, for example on the Arab-Jewish issue. This isn't a post-Zionist approach, neither hesitant nor apologetic. It's an approach of safety and security that says, 'Our place is here,' but still emphasizes the importance of dialogue, and never through condescension or arrogance. Allon extended a hand in peace, and that's the approach we want leaders to adopt today."

== Personal life ==
Allon married Ruth, who immigrated to Palestine from Germany in 1934, a year after the installment of the Machtergreifung. They had three children. Their eldest daughter Nurit (Hebrew: נוּרִית) was on the autism spectrum and could not speak until age 5. Nurit was eventually institutionalized in Scotland, where Allon visited her once a year.

After the establishment of the state of Israel in 1948, Allon changed his surname from "Peikowitz" to "Allon" (Hebrew: אלון), meaning "oak tree".

In the 1950s, the Allons helped their neighbors adopt a child, Tziona Heiman, from a hospital in Jerusalem. This event was later linked to the broader Yemenite Children Affair, during which many Jewish babies, primarily from Yemen, were put up for adoption in Israel. Heiman expressed that she was treated with love and care by her adoptive family. In an interview, Allon's wife stated they had no knowledge of Heiman's origin. As of 2016, Heiman's origins remained unclear.

== Published works ==
- Allon, Yigal (1970). Shield of David. New York: Random House. ISBN 0-297-00133-7.
- Allon, Yigal (1970). The Making of Israel's Army. London: Vallentine, Mitchell. ISBN 0-853-03027-8.
- Allon, Yigal (1975). My Father's House. New York: W. W. Norton.
