= Moshe Dayan =

Israeli military leader and politician (1915–1981)

- משה דיין
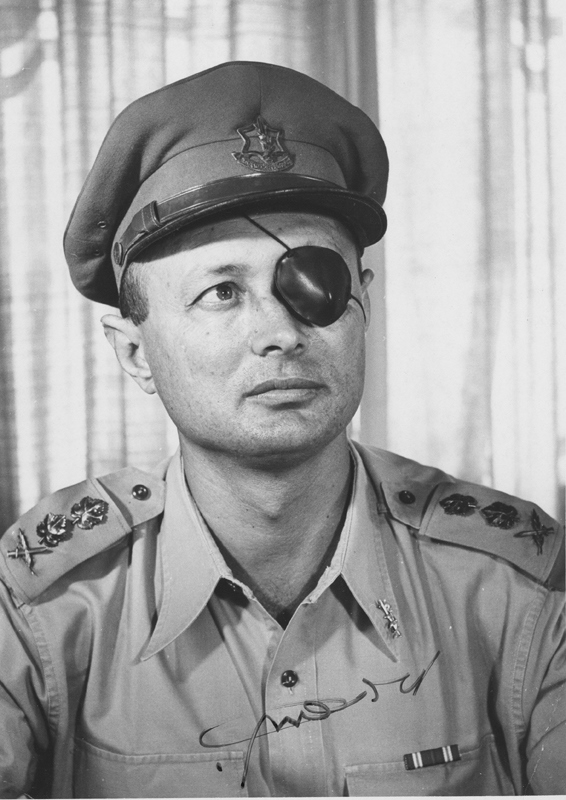
- Dayan as Chief of the General Staff

Ministerial career
- 1959–1964: Minister of Agriculture
- 1967–1974: Minister of Defense
- 1977–1979: Minister of Foreign Affairs

Faction represented in the Knesset
- 1959–1965: Mapai
- 1965–1968: Rafi
- 1968–1969: Labor
- 1969–1977: Alignment
- 1977–1981: Independent
- 1981: Telem

Military roles
- 1949–1951: Head of Southern Command
- 1952: GOC Northern Command
- 1953–1958: Chief of the General Staff

Personal details
- Born: 20 May 1915 Degania Alef, Beirut Vilayet, Ottoman Empire (now Israel)
- Died: 16 October 1981 (aged 66) Ramat Gan, Israel
- Resting place: Nahalal Cemetery
- Awards: Legion of Honour

Military service
- Allegiance: United Kingdom (Arab revolt, World War II); Israel (from 1948)
- Branch/service: Haganah (c. 1929–48); Israel Defense Forces (1948–1959)
- Rank: Rav Aluf (Chief of Staff; highest rank)
- Commands: Chief of the General staff Southern Command; Northern Command
- Battles/wars: Arab Revolt in Palestine; World War II; 1948 Arab–Israeli War; Suez Crisis; Six-Day War; War of Attrition; Yom Kippur War

Moshe Dayan (Hebrew: משה דיין; 20 May 1915 – 16 October 1981) was an Israeli military leader and politician. As commander of the Jerusalem front in the 1948 Arab–Israeli War, Chief of the General Staff of the Israel Defense Forces (1953–1958) during the 1956 Sinai War, and as Defense Minister during the Six-Day War in 1967, he became a worldwide fighting symbol of the state of Israel.

In the 1930s, Dayan joined the Haganah, the pre-state Jewish defense force of Mandatory Palestine. He served in the Special Night Squads under Orde Wingate during the Arab revolt in Palestine and later lost an eye to a sniper in a raid on Vichy forces in Lebanon during World War II. Dayan was close to David Ben-Gurion and joined him in leaving the Mapai party and setting up the Rafi party in 1965 with Shimon Peres. Dayan became Defense Minister just before the 1967 Six-Day War.

During and after Yom Kippur War of late 1973, during which Dayan served as Defense Minister, he was blamed for the lack of preparedness, and he resigned along with the rest of Golda Meir's government in early 1974. In 1977, following the election of Menachem Begin as Prime Minister, Dayan was expelled from the Israeli Labor Party because he joined the Likud-led government as Foreign Minister, playing an important part in negotiating the peace treaty between Egypt and Israel.

== Early life ==
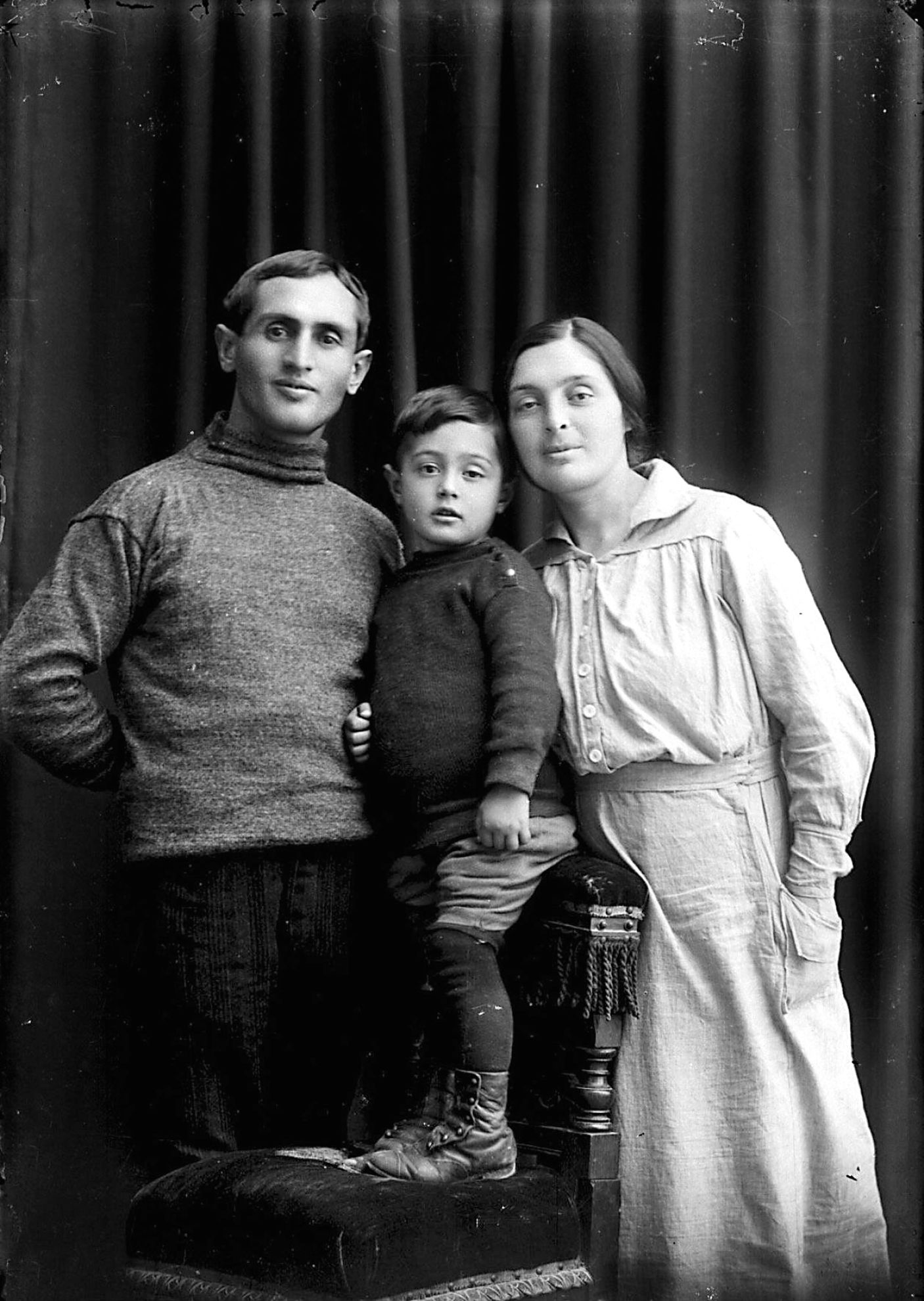
Moshe Dayan with his parents, 1918

Moshe Dayan was born on 20 May 1915 in Kibbutz Degania Alef, near the Sea of Galilee in Palestine, in what was then Ottoman Syria within the Ottoman Empire, one of three children born to Shmuel and Dvora Dayan, Ukrainian Jewish immigrants from Zhashkiv.

Dayan was the first child actually born at Degania; Gideon Baratz (1913–1988) had been born in Tiberias. He was named Moshe after Moshe Barsky, the first member of Degania to be killed in an Arab attack, who died getting medication for Dayan's father. Soon afterward, Dayan's parents moved to Nahalal, the first moshav, or farming cooperative, to be established. He attended the agricultural secondary school in Nahalal.

Dayan was a Jewish atheist. He spoke Hebrew, Arabic, and English.

== Military career ==
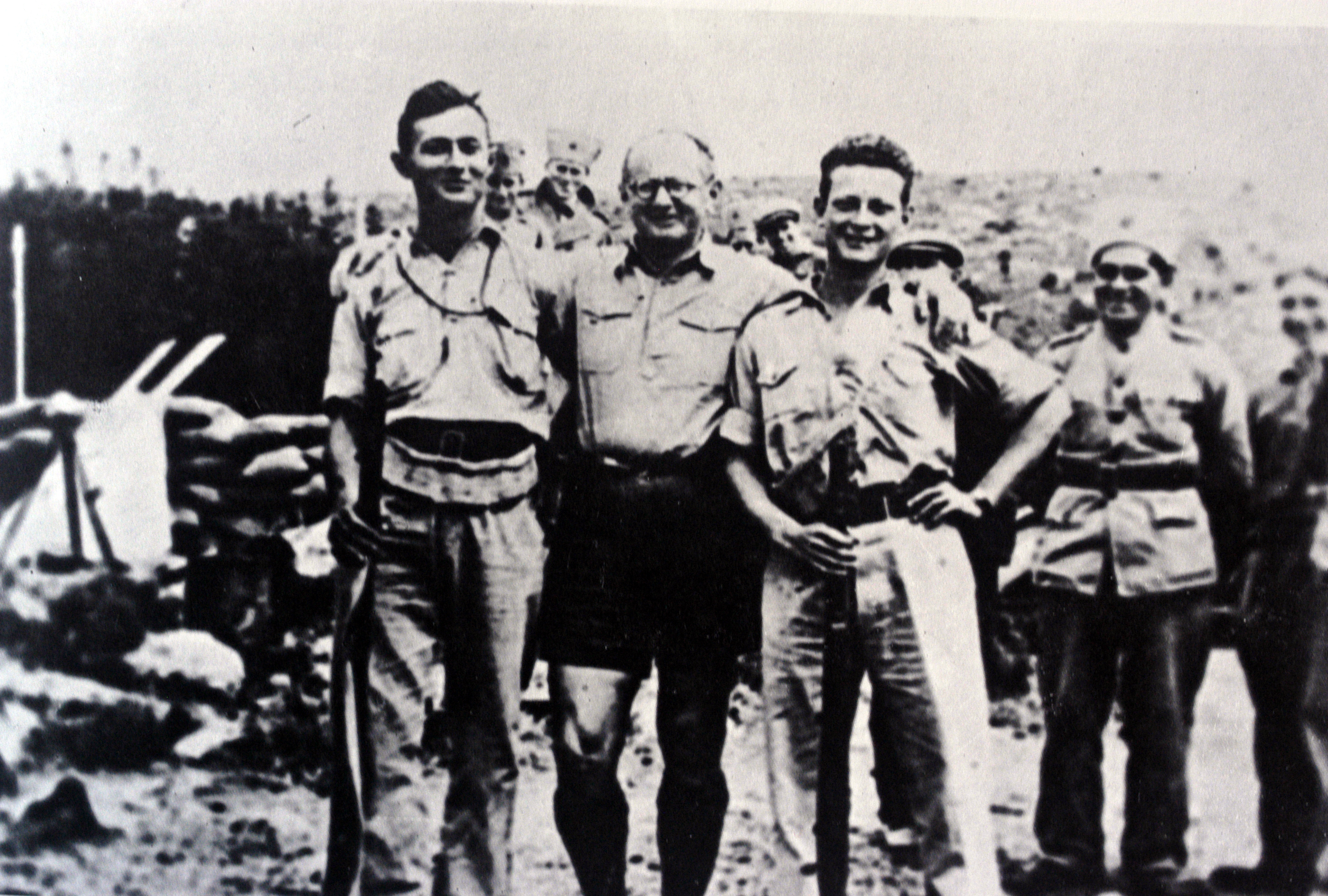
Dayan (left) with Yitzhak Sadeh and Yigal Allon, Kibbutz Hanita, 1938

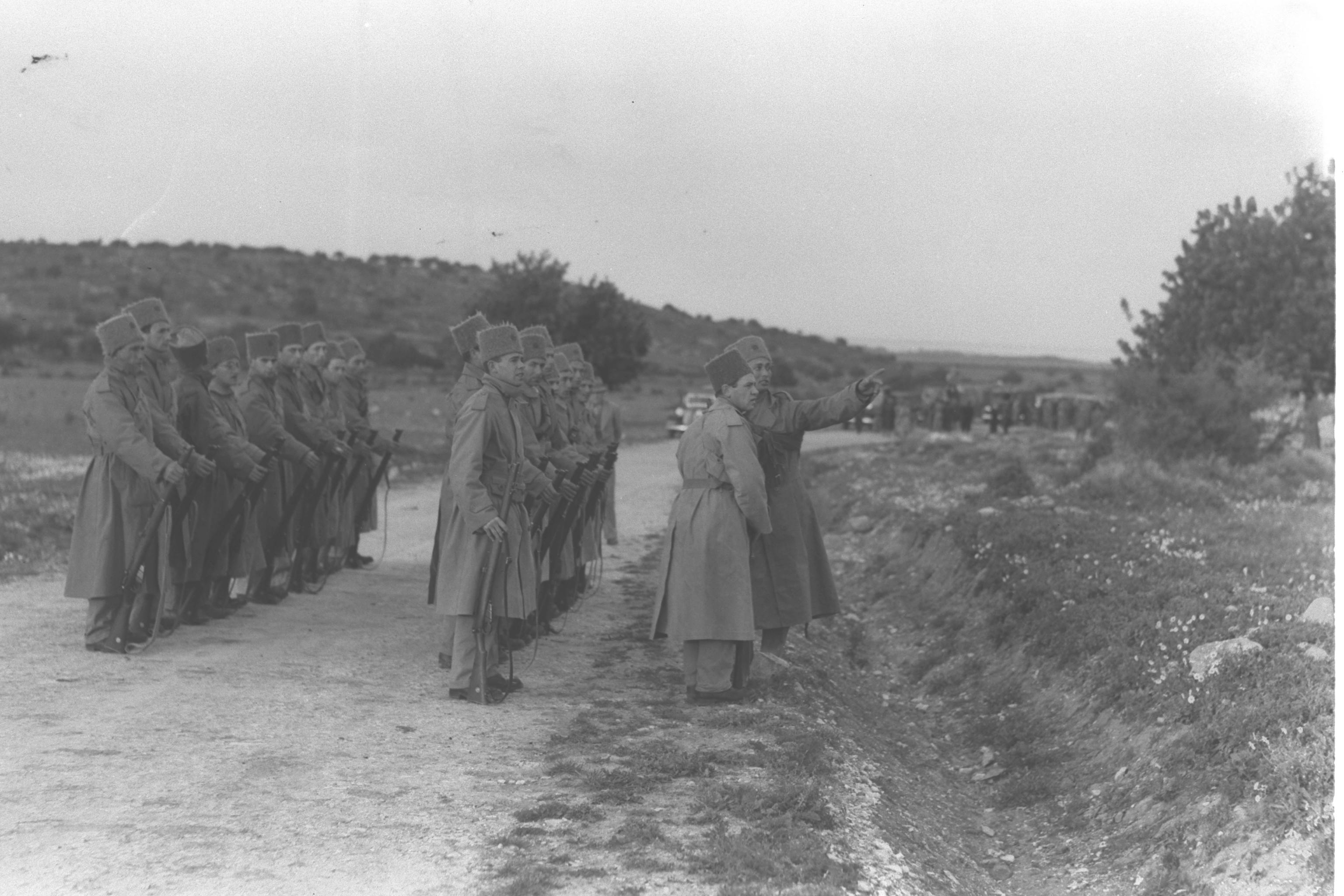
Moshe Dayan commanding a company of Jewish Supernumerary Police, Hanita, March 1938

At the age of 14, Dayan joined the Jewish defence force Haganah. He saw action during the 1936–1939 Arab revolt in Palestine. In 1938, he joined the British-organised irregular Jewish Supernumerary Police and led a small motorized patrol ("MAN"). One of his military heroes was the British pro-Zionist intelligence officer Orde Wingate, under whom he served in the Special Night Squads, participating in several operations. On 3 October 1939, he was the commanding instructor for Haganah commander's courses held at Yavniel when two Palestine Police Force officers discovered a quantity of illegal rifles. Haganah HQ ordered the camp evacuated.

Leading a group of 43 men through Wadi Bira, early the following morning, 12 to 15 Arab members of the Transjordan Frontier Force arrested them. Questions were asked about how such a large force was arrested by a much smaller one. Moshe Carmel, the group's deputy commander, was also critical of Dayan's willingness to talk to his interrogators in Acre Prison. On 30 October 1939, most of the group were sentenced to 10 years in prison.

Seven months later, Dayan was replaced as the prisoners' representative after it was discovered that moves were being made to get him an individual pardon. On 16 February 1941, after Chaim Weizmann's intervention in London, they were all released. Dayan joined the Palmach, which was established as the Haganah's elite strike force, and was assigned to a small Australian-led reconnaissance task force, which also included fellow Palmach members and Arab guides, formed in preparation for the Allied invasion of Syria and Lebanon and attached to the Australian 7th Division. Using his home kibbutz of Hanita as a forward base, the unit frequently infiltrated Vichy French Lebanon, wearing traditional Arab dress, on covert surveillance missions.

=== Eye injury ===
On 7 June 1941, the night before the invasion of the Syria–Lebanon campaign, two Palmach companies were sent in to perform a final reconnaissance of Vichy positions. Their tasks were to cut wires, ambush Vichy patrols guarding bridges, blow up culverts, sabotage roads, and guide Australian troops during the upcoming invasion. The two companies were led by Dayan and Yigal Allon. At the time, Dayan served under the command of British Lieutenant General Sir Henry Maitland Wilson. Dayan's unit secured two bridges over the Litani River. When they were not relieved as expected, at 04:00 on 8 June, the unit perceived that it was exposed to possible attack and—on its own initiative—assaulted a nearby Vichy police station, capturing it. A few hours later, as Dayan was on the roof of the building using binoculars to scan Vichy French positions on the other side of the river, the binoculars were struck by a French rifle bullet fired by a sniper from several hundred yards away, propelling metal and glass fragments into his left eye and causing severe damage. Six hours passed before he could be evacuated. Dayan lost the eye. In addition, the damage to the extraocular muscles was such that Dayan could not be fitted with a glass eye, and he was compelled to adopt the black eye patch that became his trademark.

Letters from this time revealed that despite losing his left eye and suffering serious injuries to the area where the eye was located, Dayan still pleaded with Wilson to be reenlisted in combat. He also underwent eye surgery in 1947 at a hospital in Paris, which proved to be unsuccessful.

In the years immediately following his eye injury, the disability caused him some psychological pain. Dayan wrote in his autobiography: "I reflected with considerable misgivings on my future as a cripple without a skill, trade, or profession to provide for my family." He added that he was "ready to make any effort and stand any suffering, if only I could get rid of my black eyepatch. The attention it drew was intolerable to me. I preferred to shut myself up at home, doing anything, rather than encounter the reactions of people wherever I went."

=== Haganah promotion and 89th Battalion ===
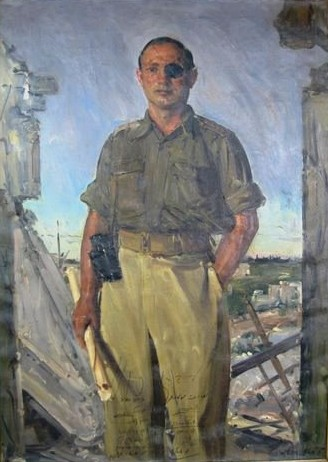
1949 portrait by Ludwig Blum

In 1947, Dayan was appointed to the Haganah General Staff working on Arab affairs, in particular recruiting agents to gain information about irregular Arab forces in Palestine. He served during the 1947–1948 civil war in Mandatory Palestine. Following the Israeli declaration of independence and the start of the 1948 Arab-Israeli War in May 1948 he continued in his position as a Haganah officer, and subsequently as an officer in the newly-formed Israel Defense Forces.

On 14 April 1948, Dayan's younger brother, Zohar "Zorik" Dayan, was killed in combat. On 22 April, Dayan was put in charge of abandoned Arab property in Haifa following its capture. To put a stop to the out-of-control looting, he ordered that anything that could be used by the army be stored in Haganah warehouses and the rest be distributed amongst Jewish agricultural settlements. On 18 May, Dayan was given command of the Jordan Valley sector. In a nine-hour battle, his troops stopped the Syrian advance south of the Sea of Galilee.

In June, he became the first commander of the 89th Battalion, part of Yitzhak Sadeh's 8th Armored Brigade. His methods of recruiting volunteers from other army units, such as the Golani and Kiryati Brigades, provoked complaints from their commanders. On 20 June 1948, two men from one of his companies were killed in a confrontation with Irgun members trying to bring weapons ashore from the Altalena at Kfar Vitkin. During Operation Danny, he led his battalion in a brief raid through Lod in which nine of his men were killed. His battalion was then transferred to the south, where they captured Karatiya, close to Faluja on 15 July. His withdrawal of his troops after only two hours, leaving a company from the Givati Brigade to face an Egyptian counterattack led to Givati Commander Shimon Avidan demanding that Dayan be disciplined. Chief of the General Staff Yigael Yadin instructed the military attorney general to proceed, but the case was dismissed.

=== Jerusalem ===
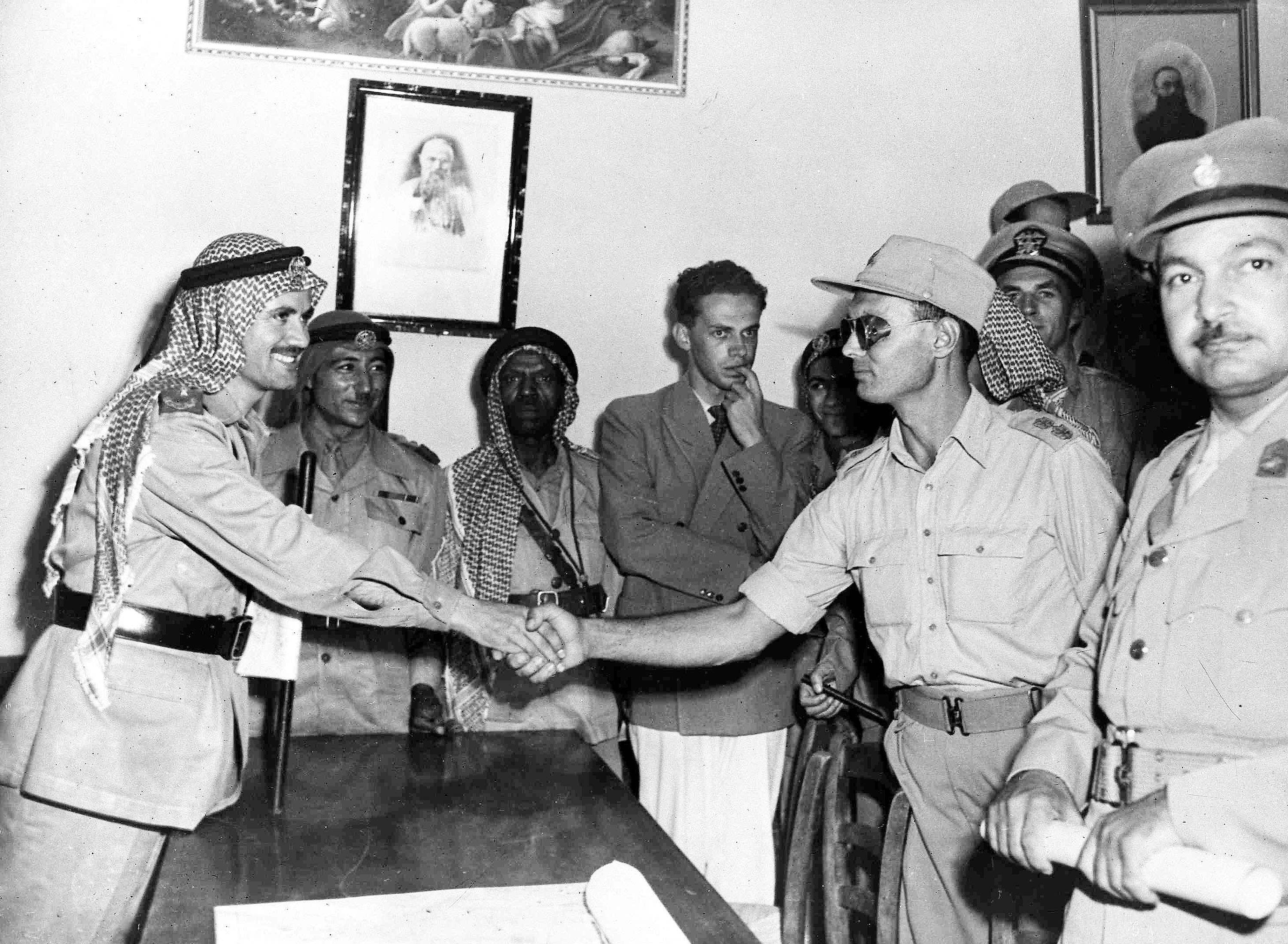
Abdullah el-Tell and Moshe Dayan reach cease-fire agreement, Jerusalem, 30 November 1948

On 23 July 1948, on David Ben-Gurion's insistence over General Staff opposition, Dayan was appointed military commander of Jewish-controlled areas of Jerusalem. In this post, he launched two military offensives. Both were night-time operations and both failed. On 17 August, he sent two companies to attempt to occupy the hillsides around Government House, but they retreated suffering casualties. On the night of 20 October 1948, to coincide with the end of Operation Yoav further south, Operation Wine Press was launched. Its objective was to capture Bethlehem via Beit Jala. Six companies set out but were pinned down by machine-gun fire in the wadi below Beit Jala and were forced to withdraw.

Following the 17 September 1948 assassination of Count Folke Bernadotte, it was over 20 hours before he imposed a curfew over Jewish Jerusalem and began arresting members of Lehi, the underground organisation believed to be responsible. One reason for this delay was the need to bring loyal troops from Tel Aviv into the city.

On 20 October 1948, Dayan commanded the 800-strong Etzioni Brigade during the ill-fated Operation Yeqev, in which the objectives were to join the Harel Brigade in the capture of the mountain range overlooking Beit Jala. The mission was called-off because of misguided navigation, and Ben Gurion's fear of upsetting the Christian world at Israel's capture of Christian sites. A ceasefire went into effect on 22 October.

In the autumn of 1948, he was involved in negotiations with Abdullah el Tell, the Jordanian military commander of East Jerusalem, over a lasting cease-fire for the Jerusalem area. In 1949, he had at least five face-to-face meetings with King Abdullah of Jordan over the Armistice Agreement and the search for a long-term peace agreement. Following a February 1949 incident, he was courtmartialed for disobeying an order from his superior, Major-General Zvi Ayalon OC Central Command. A military court found him guilty and briefly demoted him from lieutenant colonel to major. This did not prevent him from attending the armistice negotiations on Rhodes. On 29 June 1949, he was appointed head of all Israeli delegations to the Mixed Armistice Commission meetings. In September 1949, despite being involved in these negotiations, Dayan recommended to Ben-Gurion that the army should be used to open the road to Jerusalem and gain access to the Western Wall and Mount Scopus.

=== Southern Command ===
On 25 October 1949, he was promoted to major general and appointed commander of the Southern Command. Most of the staff officers resigned in protest of his replacement of Yigal Allon. The major problem in the south of the country was Palestinians crossing the border, "infiltrating", from the Gaza Strip, Sinai, and the Hebron hills. Dayan was an advocate of a "harsh" policy along the border. In Jerusalem, he had given instructions that infiltrators killed in no-man's-land or the Arab side of the border should be moved to the Israeli side before UN inspections. Allon had already introduced a 7 kilometre "free-fire" zone along the southern borders. In the spring of 1950, Dayan authorized the Israeli Air Force to strafe shepherds and their herds in the Beit Govrin area. There were also strafing attacks on bedouin camps in the Gaza area. In early 1950, 700 bedouin, 'Azame, were expelled from the South Hebron area. In September 1950, several thousand more were driven from the demilitarized zone at Al-Ajua During 1950, the remaining population of al-Majdal were transferred to the Gaza Strip In a notorious incident on 31 May 1950, the army forced 120 Arabs across the Jordanian border at 'Arava. "Two or three dozen" died of thirst before reaching safety.

During 1950, Dayan also developed a policy of punitive cross-border reprisal raids in response to fedayeen attacks on Israelis. IDF squads were sent into the Gaza Strip to lay mines. The first retaliation raid on a village occurred 20 March 1950 when six Arabs were killed at Khirbet Jamrura. On 18 June 1950, Dayan explained his thinking to the Mapai faction in the Knesset:

[Retaliation is] the only method that [has] proved effective, not justified or moral but effective, when Arabs plants mines on our side. If we try to search for that Arab, it has no value. But if we harass the nearby village... then the population there comes out against the [infiltrators]... and the Egyptian Government and the Transjordanian government are [driven] to prevent such incidents, because their prestige is [at stake], as the Jews have opened fire, and they are unready to begin a war... The method of collective punishment so far has proved effective... There are no other effective methods.

In 1950, Moshe Dayan also ordered the Israeli army to destroy the Shrine of Husayn's Head, more than a year after hostilities ended. It is thought that the demolition was related to Dayan's efforts to expel the remaining Palestinian Arabs from the region.

On 8 March 1951, 18 were killed at Idna. On 20 October 1951, two Battalion 79 (7th Brigade) companies destroyed several houses and an ice factory in eastern Gaza City; dozens were killed and injured. On 6 January 1952, an armoured infantry company from the same battalion attacked a Bedouin camp, Nabahim, near Bureij refugee camp killing 15. Glubb Pasha wrote that the objective of this new strategy seemed to "be merely to kill Arabs indiscriminately". Dayan saw it as an "eye for an eye". He was a close friend of Amos Yarkoni, an Arab officer in the Israel Defense Forces, At the time, the Military Commander commented that "if Moshe Dayan could be the Ramatkal (Chief of the General Staff) without an eye, we can have a Battalion Commander with a prosthetic hand".

At the end of 1951, Dayan attended a course at the British Army's Senior Officers' School in Devizes, England. In May 1952, he was appointed operational commander of the Northern Command.

=== Chief of the General Staff ===
Chief of the General Staff Moshe Dayan inspecting the honor guard during a ceremony marking the end of officers course at Bahad 1, January 1955

The year 1952 was a time of economic crisis for the new state. Faced with demands of a 20% cut in budget and the discharge of 6,000 IDF members, Yigael Yadin resigned as Chief of the General Staff in November 1952, and was replaced by Mordechai Maklef. In December 1952, Dayan was promoted to Chief of the Operations (G) Branch, the second most senior General Staff post. One of Dayan's actions in this post was to commence work on the canal diverting water from the River Jordan, September 1953.

During 1953, Prime Minister and Defence Minister David Ben-Gurion began to make preparations for his retirement. His choice for defence minister was Pinhas Lavon, who became acting MoD in the autumn of 1953. Lavon and Maklef were unable to work together and Maklef resigned. Dayan was immediately appointed CoS on 7 December 1953. This appointment was Ben-Gurion's last act as prime minister before his replacement by acting Prime Minister Moshe Sharett.

On taking command, based on Ben-Gurion's three-year defence programme, Dayan carried out a major reorganisation of the Israeli army, which, among others, included:

- Strengthened combat units at the expense of the administrative "tail".
- Raising the Intelligence and Training Branches of the Israeli Army.
- Surrendering the activities of stores and procurement to the civilian Defence Ministry.
- Revamping the mobilisation scheme and ensuring earmarking for adequate equipment.
- Starting a military academy for officers of the rank of major and above.
- Emphasised strike forces (Air Force, Armour) and on training of commando battalions.
- Developed GADNA, a youth wing for military training.

In May 1955, Dayan attended a meeting convened by Ben-Gurion. Ben-Gurion raised the issue of a possible invasion of Iraq into Syria, and how this could be used to bring about change in Lebanon. Dayan proposed that:

All that is required is to find an officer, even a captain would do, to win his heart or buy him with money to get him to agree to declare himself the savior of the Maronite population. Then the Israeli army will enter Lebanon, occupy the necessary territory, and create a Christian regime that will ally itself with Israel. The territory from the Litani southward will be totally annexed to Israel, and everything will fall into place.

Prime Minister Moshe Sharett, shocked by the officers' indifference to neighbouring Lebanon, turned down the plan as divorced from reality.

=== Cross-border operations ===
In July 1953, while on the General staff, Dayan was party to the setting up of Unit 101, which was to specialise in night-time cross-border retaliation raids. He was initially opposed to setting up such a group because he argued it would undermine his attempts to prepare the IDF for an offensive war. Unit 101's first official operation was to attack, on 28 August 1953, the Bureij Refugee Camp, during which they killed 20 refugees and suffered 2 wounded.

By October 1953, Dayan was closely involved with 101. He was one of the main architects of the Qibya massacre, on the night of 14/15 October 1953, in response to the killing of 3 Israeli civilians in the Yehud attack on 12 October. The General Staff order stated "temporarily to conquer the village of Qibya – with the aim of blowing up houses and hitting the inhabitants". The Central Command Operation Instructions were more specific: "carry out destruction and maximum killings." One hundred and thirty IDF soldiers, of whom a third came from Unit 101, carried out the operation. They carried 70 kg of explosives, blew up 45 houses, and killed 69 people. The commander who led the attack, Ariel Sharon later said that he had "thought the houses were empty". The international criticism over the killed civilians led to a change of tactics. It was the last large-scale IDF attack on civilian buildings. In the future, targets were to be the Arab Legion, the Frontier Police, and the Egyptian or Syrian Armies. Dayan merged Unit 101 with the Paratroopers Brigade and assigned its command to Sharon.

Dayan had a difficult relationship with MoD Lavon. There were issues over spending priorities and over Lavon's dealings with senior IDF members behind Dayan's back. This ended with Lavon's resignation over who ordered the sabotage operation in Egypt, which led to the trial of a number of Egyptian Jews, two of whom were executed.

Dayan believed in the value of punitive cross-border retaliation raids:

We cannot save each water pipe from explosion or each tree from being uprooted. We cannot prevent the murder of workers in orange groves or of families in their beds. But we can put a very high price on their blood, a price so high that it will no longer be worthwhile for the Arabs, the Arab armies, for the Arab states to pay it.

Prime Minister Sharett was an advocate of restraint and was not as confident in the attacks' effectiveness. When seeking approval for operations, Dayan downplayed the scale of the raids to get approval. There were fewer large-scale cross-border raids in 1954. Between December 1953 and September 1954, at least 48 Arabs were killed in over 18 cross-border raids. Fifteen of the dead were civilians: farmers, shepherds, and a doctor; two were women. With Ben-Gurion's return, this changed. On the night of 28 February 1955, Operation Black Arrow (Mivtza Hetz Shahor) was launched against an Egyptian Army camp south of Gaza City. The IDF force consisted of 120 paratroops and suffered 14 dead; 36 Egyptian soldiers were killed as well as two Palestinian civilians. Ben-Gurion and Dayan had told Sharett that their estimate of Egyptian casualties was 10. On 31 August 1955, despite Sharett's opposition, three paratroop companies attacked the British-built Tegart fort in Khan Yunis. Operation Elkayam directives called for "killing as many enemy soldiers as possible". The police station and a number of other buildings were blown-up and 72 Egyptian and Palestinians were killed.

=== Armaments ===
Between 1955 and 1956, Dayan and Shimon Peres negotiated a series of large weapons contracts with France. On 10 November 1955, an agreement was signed for the delivery of 100 AMX-13 tanks and assorted anti-tank weapons. On 24 June 1956, an $80 million deal was agreed involving 72 Dassault Mystère IV jets, 120 AMX-13 tanks, 40 Sherman tanks and 18 105mm artillery. The Mystere were in addition to 53 already on order. At the end of September 1956, a further 100 Sherman tanks, 300 half-tracks, and 300 6x6 trucks were added.

By the beginning of November 1956, the Israeli army had 380 tanks.

=== Escalation up to the Suez Crisis ===
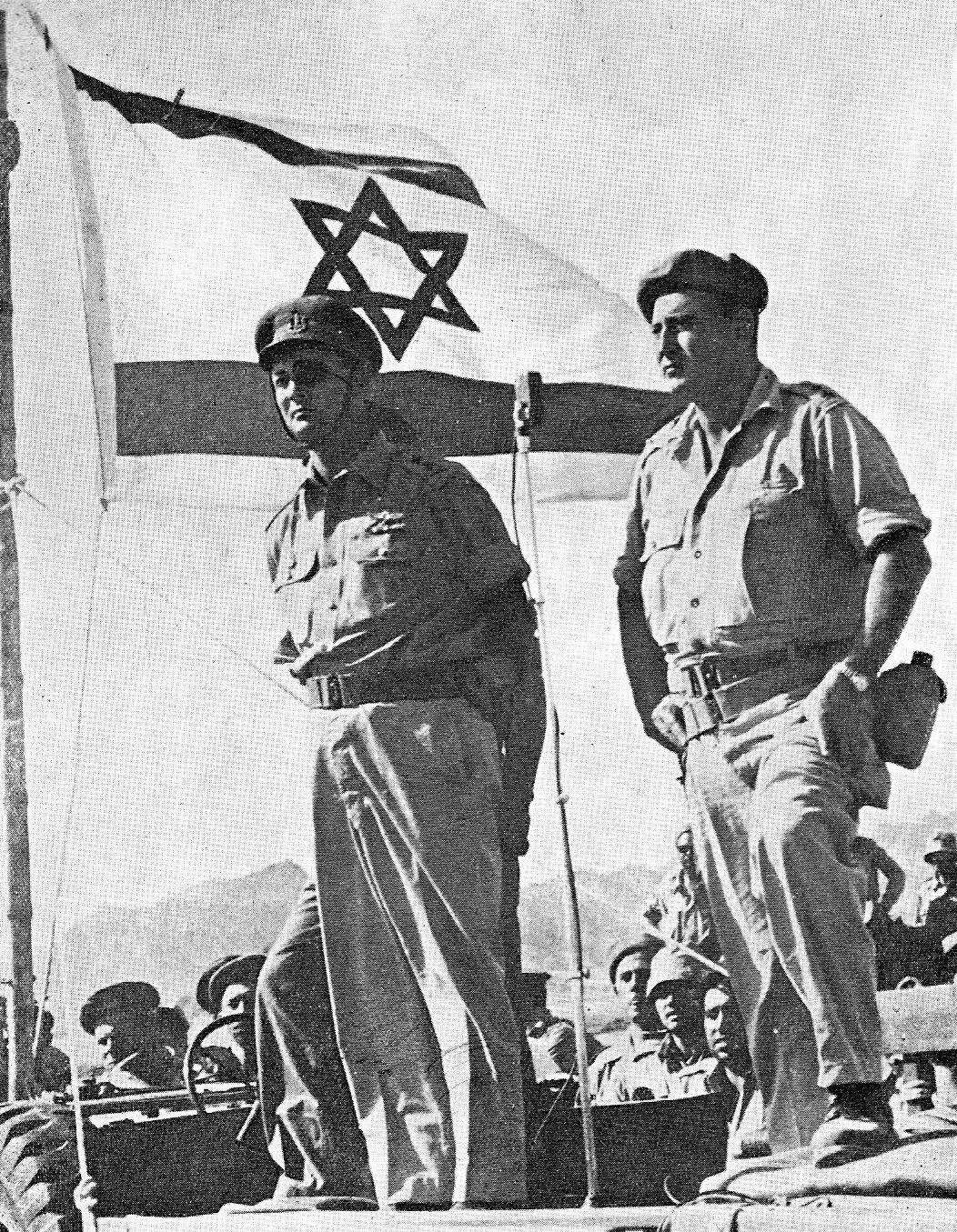
Chief of Staff Moshe Dayan and Avraham Yoffe, commanding officer of the 9th Oded Brigade, at Sharm el-Sheikh after Operation Kadesh

Following the 1955 elections, Ben-Gurion resumed his dual role as prime minister and defense minister. Dayan, who believed in the inevitability of the "Second Round", argued for a preemptive attack on Israel's neighbours, particularly Egypt. The two leaders thought war with Egypt could be achieved by provoking an Egyptian response to retaliation raids, which could then be used to justify an all-out attack. On 23 October 1955, Ben-Gurion instructed Dayan to prepare plans to capture Sharm al Sheikh.

On the night of 27 October 1955, an IDF battalion attacked an Egyptian army post at Kuntilla (Operation Egged), killing 12 Egyptian soldiers. On 2 November, al Sabha, close to the DMZ, was attacked, in Operation Volcano (Mivtza Ha Ga'ash), killing 81 Egyptian soldiers. On 11 December, hoping an attack on Syria would provoke an Egyptian response, Operation Olive Leaves/Sea of Galilee (Mivtza 'Alei Zayit/Kinneret) was launched in which a number of Syrian positions on the eastern shore of the Sea of Galilee were destroyed. Forty-eight Syrian soldiers were killed as well as six civilians. The Egyptians did not react.

A Cabinet meeting on 15 December 1955 voted against further provocations and ruled that any retaliation attacks must have full Cabinet approval. The raids ceased for six months. There was one exception: On 5 April 1956, following two earlier incidents along the border with the Gaza Strip in which four Israeli soldiers were killed, the IDF shelled the centre of Gaza City with 120 mm mortars. Fifty-eight civilians were killed, including 10 children. 4 Egyptian soldiers were also killed. It is not clear whether Dayan had Ben-Gurion's approval to shell the city. Egypt responded by resuming fedayeen attacks across the border, killing 14 Israelis during the period 11–17 April.

During September–October 1956, as plans began to mature for the invasion of the Sinai Peninsula, Dayan ordered a series of large-scale cross-border raids. On the night of 25 September, following a number of incidents including the machine-gunning of large gathering at Ramat Rachel in which four Israelis were killed, and the murder of a girl southwest of Jerusalem, the 890th Battalion attacked the Husan police station and nearby Arab Legion positions close to the armistice lines. Thirty-seven Legionnaires and National Guardsmen were killed as well as two civilians. Nine or ten paratroopers were killed, several in a road accident after the attack.

Following the killing of two workers near Even-Yehuda, Dayan ordered a similar attack, Operation Samaria/Mivtza Shomron, on the Qalqilya police station. The attack took place on the night of 10 October 1956 and involved several thousand IDF soldiers. During the fighting, Jordanian troops surrounded a paratroop company. The Israeli survivors only escaped under close air-cover from four IAF aircraft. The Israelis suffered 18 killed and 68 wounded; 70–90 Jordanians were killed. In the aftermath, paratroop officers severely criticized Dayan for alleged tactical mistakes. It was the last time the IDF launched a reprisal raid at night.

As Israel Defense Forces Chief of the General Staff, Moshe Dayan personally commanded the Israeli forces fighting in the Sinai during the 1956 Suez Crisis. It was during his tenure as Chief of the General Staff that Dayan delivered his famous eulogy of Ro'i Rutenberg, a young Israeli resident of Kibbutz Nahal Oz, killed by fedayeen who ambushed him in the kibbutz fields in 1956. Dayan's words became famous quickly and the euology has served as one of the most influential speeches in Israeli history since. In forceful terms, Dayan condemned the killing and said,

"Early yesterday morning Roi was murdered. The quiet of the spring morning dazzled him and he did not see those waiting in ambush for him, at the edge of the furrow. Let us not cast the blame on the murderers today. Why should we declare their burning hatred for us? For eight years they have been sitting in the refugee camps in Gaza, and before their eyes we have been transforming the lands and the villages, where they and their fathers dwelt, into our estate. It is not among the Arabs in Gaza, but in our own midst that we must seek Roi's blood. How did we shut our eyes and refuse to look squarely at our fate, and see, in all its brutality, the destiny of our generation? Have we forgotten that this group of young people dwelling at Nahal Oz is bearing the heavy gates of Gaza on its shoulders? Beyond the furrow of the border, a sea of hatred and desire for revenge is swelling, awaiting the day when serenity will dull our path, for the day when we will heed the ambassadors of malevolent hypocrisy who call upon us to lay down our arms. Roi's blood is crying out to us and only to us from his torn body. Although we have sworn a thousandfold that our blood shall not flow in vain, yesterday again we were tempted, we listened, we believed.
We will make our reckoning with ourselves today; we are a generation that settles the land and without the steel helmet and the cannon's maw, we will not be able to plant a tree and build a home. Let us not be deterred from seeing the loathing that is inflaming and filling the lives of the hundreds of thousands of Arabs who live around us. Let us not avert our eyes lest our arms weaken. This is the fate of our generation. This is our life's choice – to be prepared and armed, strong and determined, lest the sword be stricken from our fist and our lives cut down. The young Roi who left Tel Aviv to build his home at the gates of Gaza to be a wall for us was blinded by the light in his heart and he did not see the flash of the sword. The yearning for peace deafened his ears and he did not hear the voice of murder waiting in ambush. The gates of Gaza weighed too heavily on his shoulders and overcame him."

== Political career ==
In 1959, a year after he retired from the IDF, Dayan joined Mapai, the Israeli centre-left party, then led by David Ben-Gurion. Until 1964, he was the Minister of Agriculture. In 1965, Dayan joined with the group of Ben-Gurion loyalists who defected from Mapai to form Rafi. Prime Minister Levi Eshkol disliked Dayan. When tensions began to rise in early 1967, however, Eshkol appointed the charismatic and popular Dayan defense minister to raise public morale and bring Rafi into a unity government.

Dayan advocated for continual Israeli occupation of the West Bank and Gaza Strip for a transitional period before the final status, which he envisioned as Israel and Jordan sharing responsibility for the Palestinian territories.

=== Vietnam ===
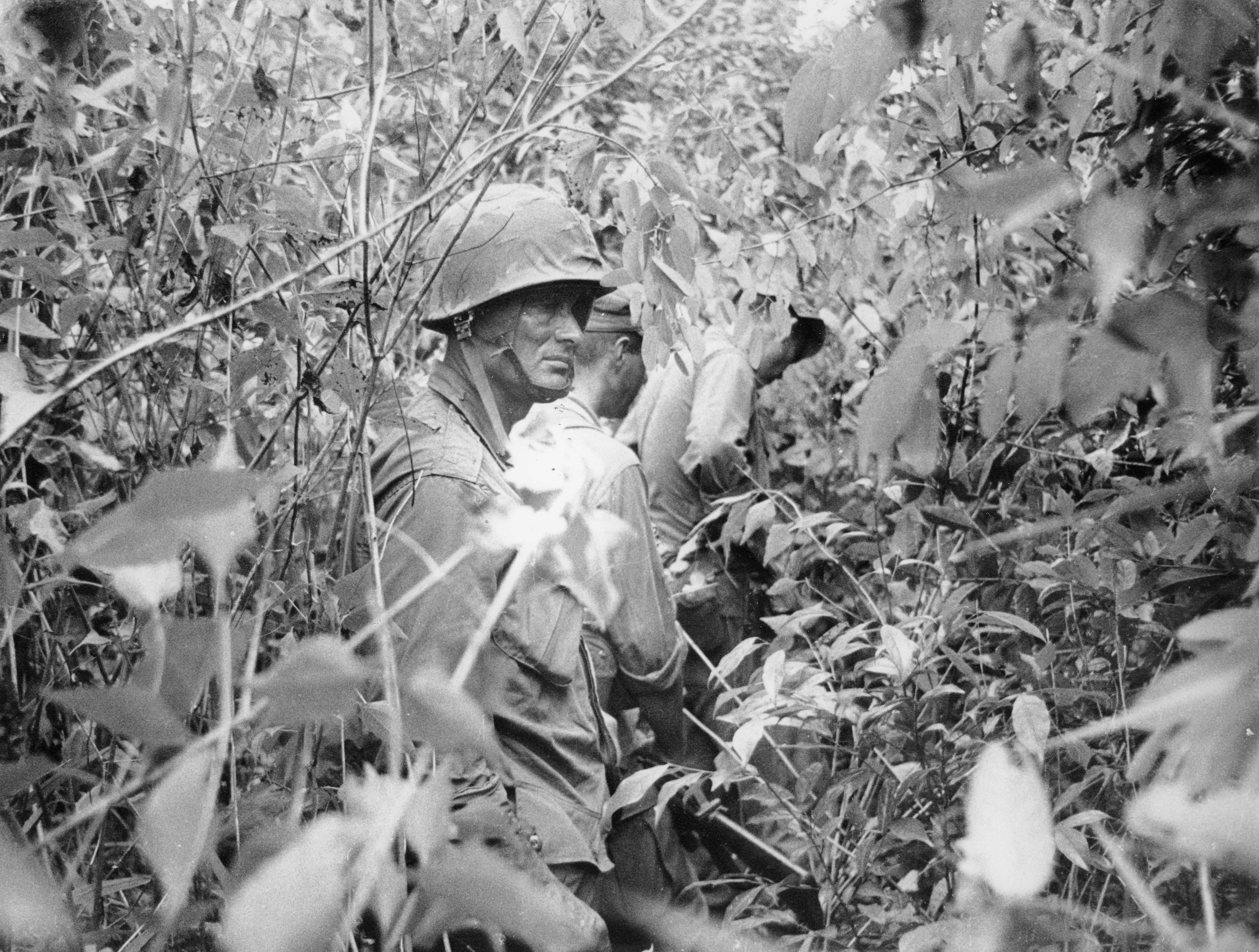
Dayan in Vietnam

In 1966 Dayan used his connections to have himself embedded with American forces fighting the Vietnam War as an observer for Maariv, The Sunday Telegraph, and The Washington Post, for which he wrote a series of articles about the war. Dayan wanted to go to Vietnam due to boredom with his role as a Knesset member and a desire to get another look at war, recalling in his memoir that it had been "ten years since I had been in battle, ten years since I had been at the wrong end of an enemy tank, field gun, and attack plane—and at the right end of our own. I wanted to see for myself, on the spot, what modern war was like, how the new weaponry was handled, how it shaped up in action, whether it could be adopted for our own use." Dayan initially held a series of meetings with experienced military officers to discuss the war. He met Bernard Montgomery in London and French generals who had served in the First Indochina War in Paris before flying to Washington, D.C. and spending a week speaking to American military and political figures, including Walt Rostow, Maxwell D. Taylor, and Robert McNamara. He then spent five weeks in Vietnam, meeting numerous American military officers including General William Westmoreland as well as South Vietnamese political and military leader Nguyễn Văn Thiệu, visiting the aircraft carrier USS Constellation, and joining American units in the field, including a US Marine unit led by First Lieutenant Charles C. Krulak, a future Commandant of the United States Marine Corps. Dayan came away impressed with American firepower, commenting that "what the Americans have at their disposal is all that a commander can visualize in a dream", but critical of American strategy in the war. He doubted that the Communists could overcome the overwhelming US military superiority in Vietnam but commented that they could win politically if the Americans "for political reasons (domestic or foreign)…decide to call a halt to the war before achieving total victory."

=== 1967 Six-Day War ===
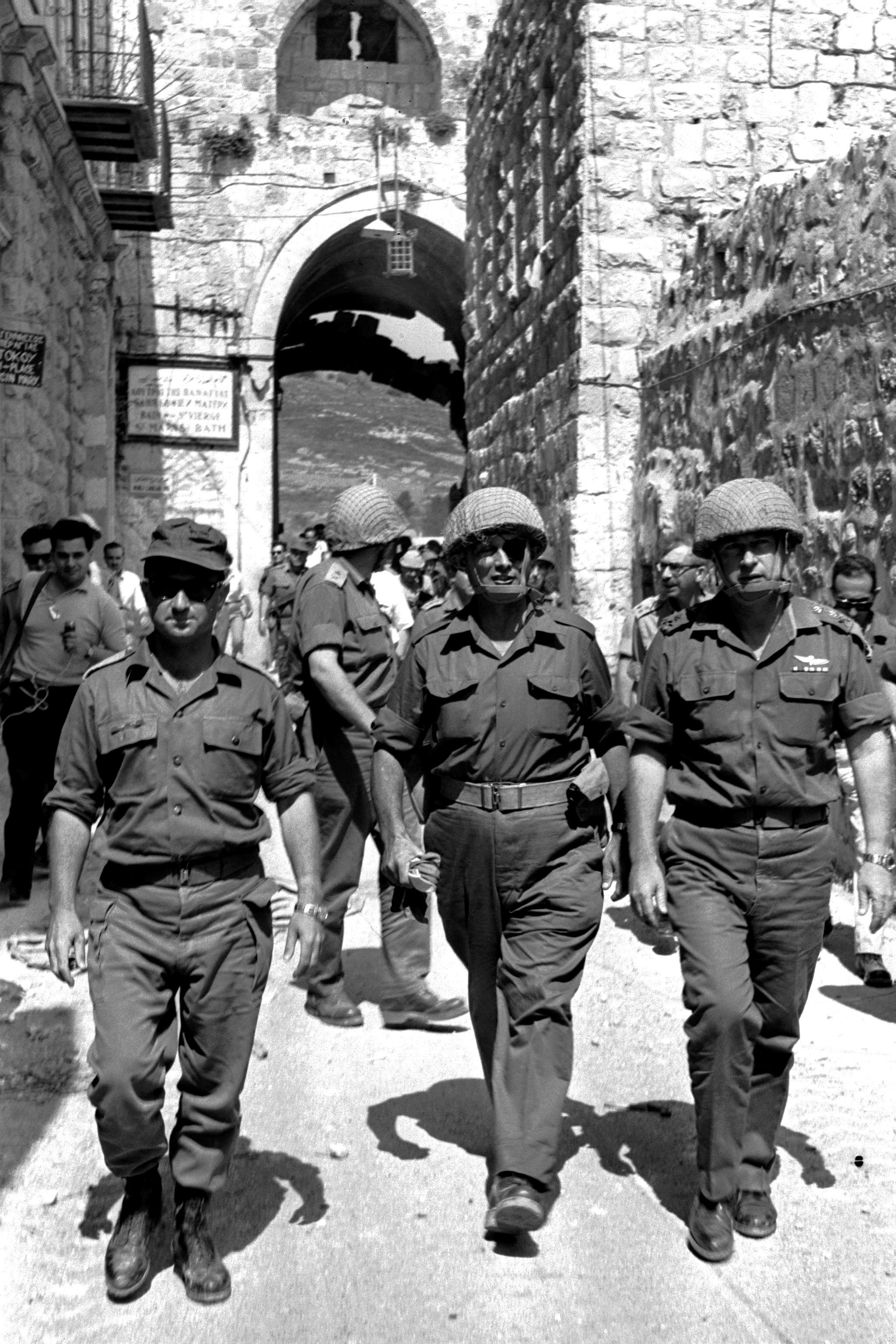
Minister of Defense Moshe Dayan (center) with Chief of Staff Yitzhak Rabin (right) and General Uzi Narkiss (left) in the Old City of Jerusalem after it was taken during the Six-Day War

Dayan became defense minister shortly before the start of the Six-Day War in June 1967. Although he did not take part in most of the pre-war planning, he personally oversaw the capture of East Jerusalem during the 5–7 June fighting. During the years following the war, Dayan enjoyed enormous popularity in Israel and was widely viewed as a potential Prime Minister. At this time, Dayan was the leader of the hawkish camp within the Labor government, opposing a return to anything like Israel's pre-1967 borders. He once said that he preferred Sharm-al-Sheikh (an Egyptian town on the southern edge of the Sinai Peninsula overlooking Israel's shipping lane to the Red Sea via the Gulf of Aqaba) without peace, to peace without Sharm-al-Sheikh. He modified these views later in his career and played an important role in the eventual peace agreement between Israel and Egypt.

Dayan's contention was denied by Muky Tsur, a longtime leader of the United Kibbutz Movement who said "For sure there were discussions about going up the Golan Heights or not going up the Golan Heights, but the discussions were about security for the kibbutzim in Galilee," he said. "I think that Dayan himself didn't want to go to the Golan Heights. This is something we've known for many years. But no kibbutz got any land from conquering the Golan Heights. People who went there went on their own. It's cynicism to say the kibbutzim wanted land."

About Dayan's comments, Israeli ambassador to the United States Michael Oren has said

There is an element of truth to Dayan's claim, but it is important to note that Israel regarded the de-militarized zones in the north as part of their sovereign territory and reserved the right to cultivate them—a right that the Syrians consistently resisted with force. Syria also worked to benefit from the Jordan river before it flowed into Israel, aiming to get use of it as a water source; Syria also actively supported Palestinian terrorist attacks against Israel. Israel occasionally exploited incidents in the de-militarized zones to strike at the Syrian water diversion project and to punish the Syrians for their support of terror. Dayan's remarks must also be taken in context of the fact that he was a member of the opposition at the time. His attitude toward the Syrians changed dramatically once he became defense minister. Indeed, on June 8, 1967, Dayan bypassed both the Prime Minister and the Chief of the General Staff in ordering the Israeli army to attack and capture the Golan.

==== USS Liberty incident ====
During the Six-Day War, Israeli aerial and naval forces attacked the USS Liberty spy ship as she was on patrol in international waters in the eastern Mediterranean Sea, killing 34 American sailors and wounding 174. Israel's official explanation was that the attack was a case of mistaken identity, but this remains disputed. Many Liberty survivors and their supporters maintain that Dayan personally ordered the attack. One of the prevailing theories for the motivation for the attack is that the Israelis wished to keep secret their pending invasion of the Golan Heights, and they feared that the signals intelligence collection ship might have collected intelligence about the pending invasion.

=== 1973 Yom Kippur War ===
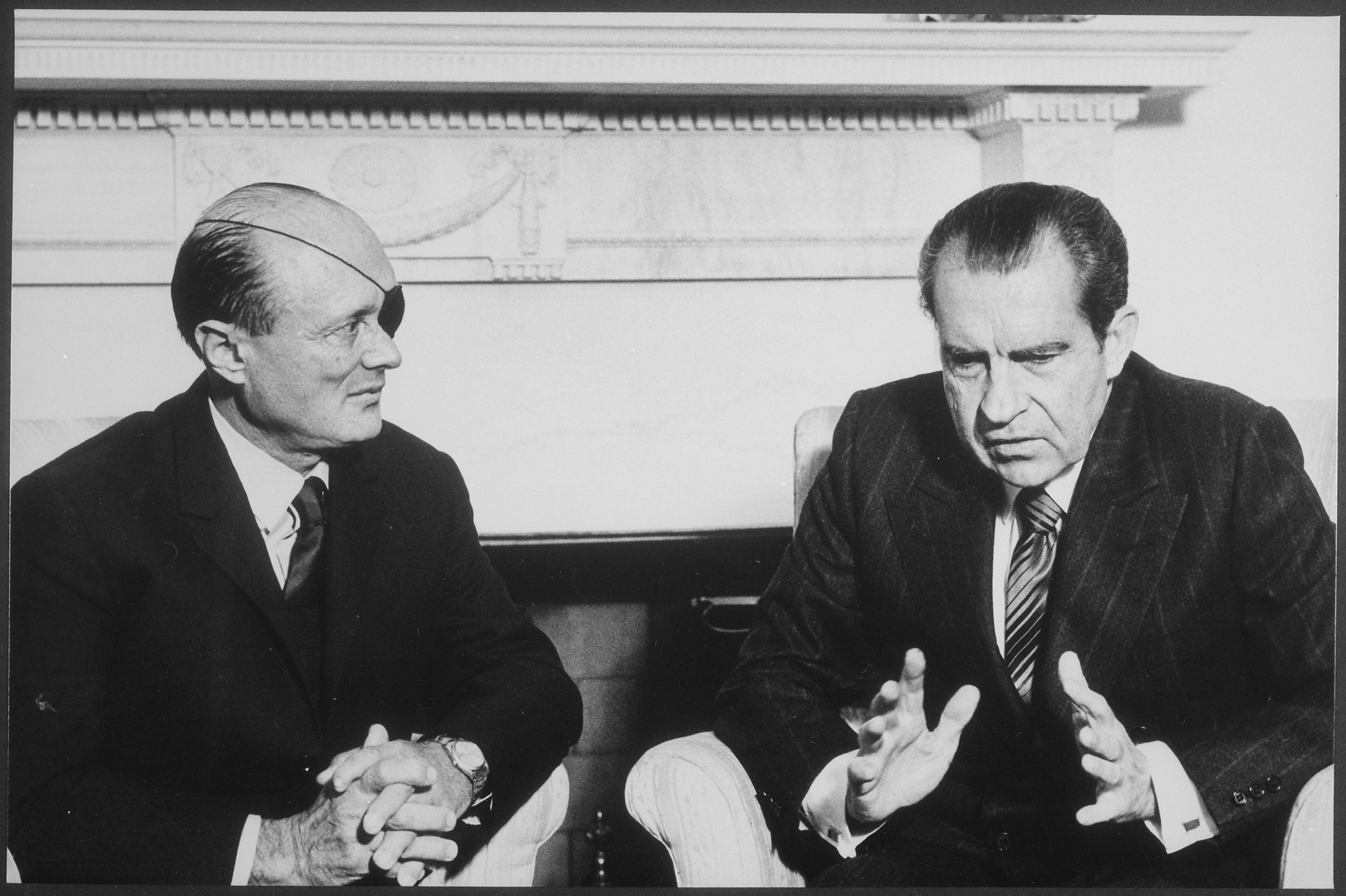
Moshe Dayan with President Richard Nixon (1970)

After Golda Meir became prime minister in 1969 following the death of Levi Eshkol, Dayan remained defense minister.

He was still in that post when the Yom Kippur War began catastrophically for Israel on 6 October 1973. As the highest-ranking official responsible for military planning, Dayan may bear part of the responsibility for the Israeli leadership having missed the signs for the upcoming war. In the hours preceding the war, Dayan chose not to order a full mobilization or a preemptive strike against the Egyptians and Syrians. He assumed that Israel would be able to win easily even if the Arabs attacked and, more importantly, did not want Israel to appear as the aggressor, as it would have undoubtedly cost it the invaluable support of the United States (who would later mount a massive airlift to rearm Israel).

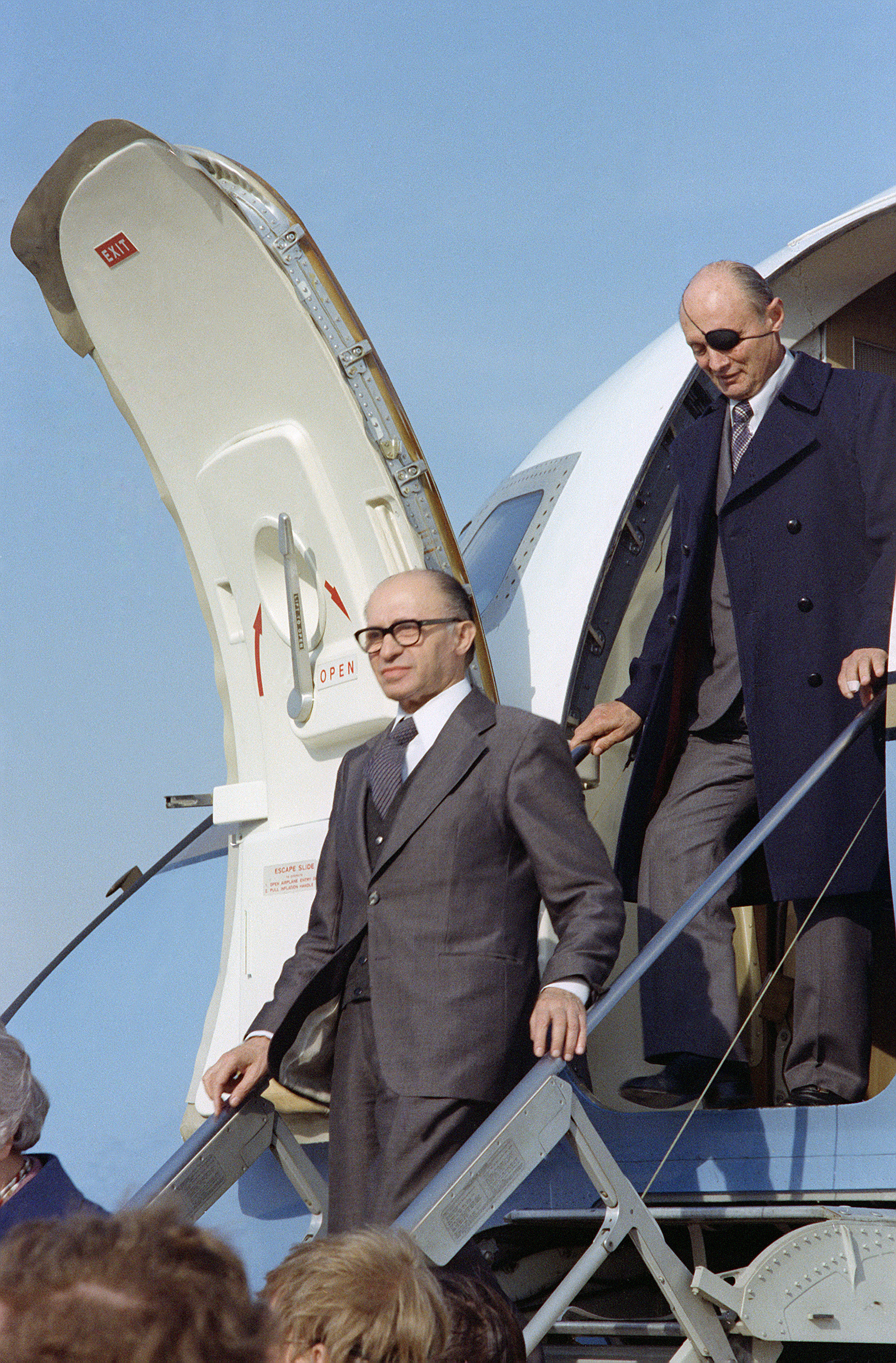
Moshe Dayan and Menachem Begin at Andrews Air Force Base, Maryland (1978)

Following the heavy defeats of the first two days, Dayan's views changed radically; he was close to announcing 'the downfall of the "Third Temple"' at a news conference, but was forbidden to speak by Meir.

Dayan suggested options at the beginning of the war, including a plan to withdraw to the Mitleh Mountains in Sinai and a complete withdrawal from the Golan Heights to carry the battle over the Jordan, abandoning the core strategic principles of Israeli war doctrine, which says that war must be taken into enemy territory as soon as possible. Chief of the General Staff David Elazar objected to these plans and was proved correct. Israel broke through the Egyptian lines on the Sinai front, crossed the Suez Canal, and encircled the 3rd Egyptian Army. Israel also counterattacked on the Syrian front, repelling the Jordanian and Iraqi expeditionary forces and shelling the outskirts of Damascus. Although the war ended with an Israeli victory, the Arab attack destroyed Israel's image of invincibility and eventually led to the Egyptian-Israeli peace treaty and the subsequent withdrawal of Israeli forces from all Egyptian territory.

=== Foreign minister ===
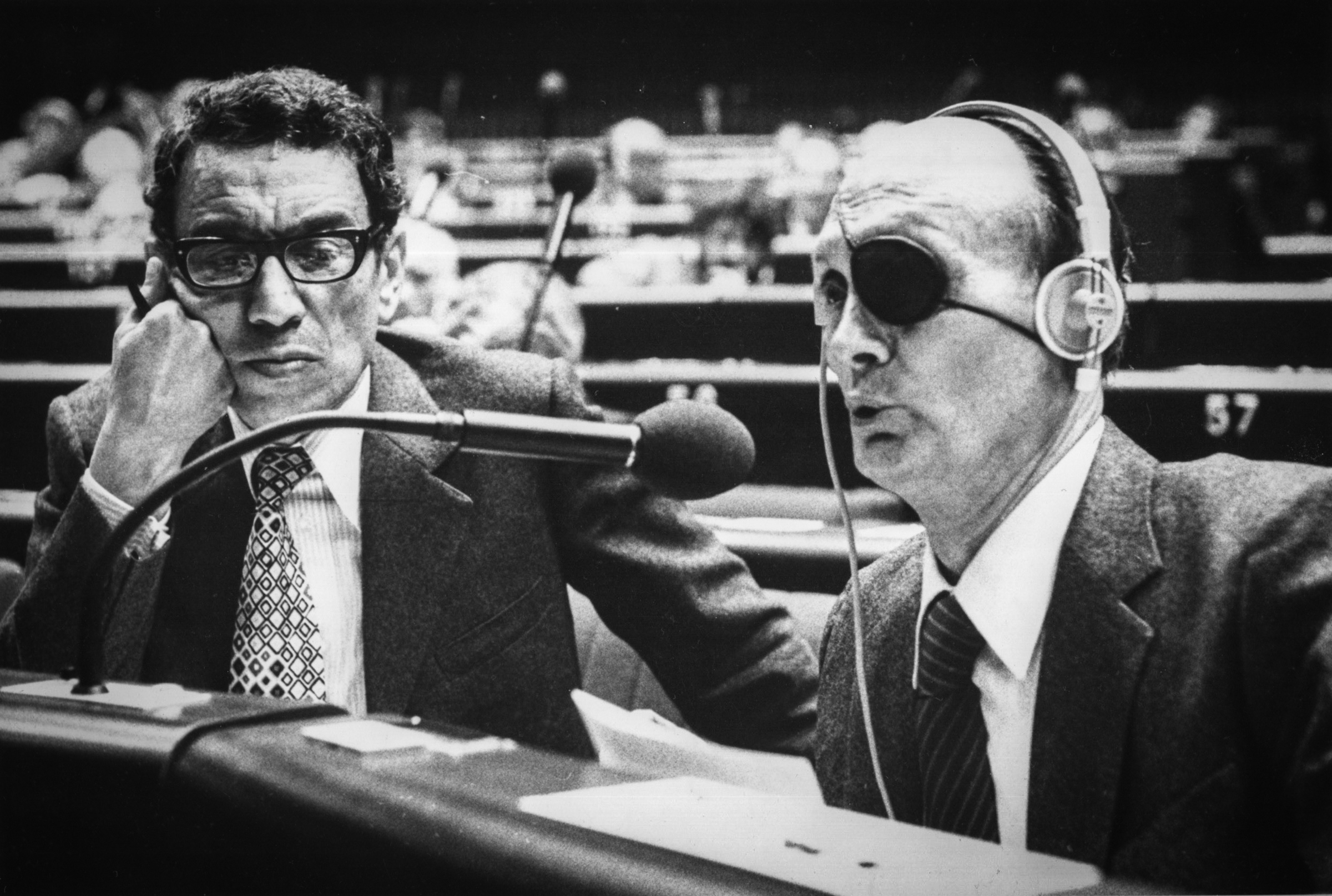
Boutros Boutros-Ghali and Moshe Dayan at Council of Europe in Strasbourg, October 1979

According to those who knew him, the war deeply depressed Dayan. He went into political eclipse for a time. In 1977, despite having been re-elected to the Knesset for the Alignment, he accepted the offer to become Foreign Minister in the new Likud government led by Menachem Begin. He was expelled from the Alignment, and as a result, sat as an independent MK. As foreign minister in Begin's government, he was instrumental in drawing up the Camp David Accords, a peace agreement with Egypt. Dayan resigned his post in October 1979, because of a disagreement with Begin over whether the Palestinian territories were an internal Israeli matter (the Camp David treaty included provisions for future negotiations with the Palestinians; Begin, who did not like the idea, did not put Dayan in charge of the negotiating team). In 1981, he founded a new party, Telem.

== Personal life and family ==
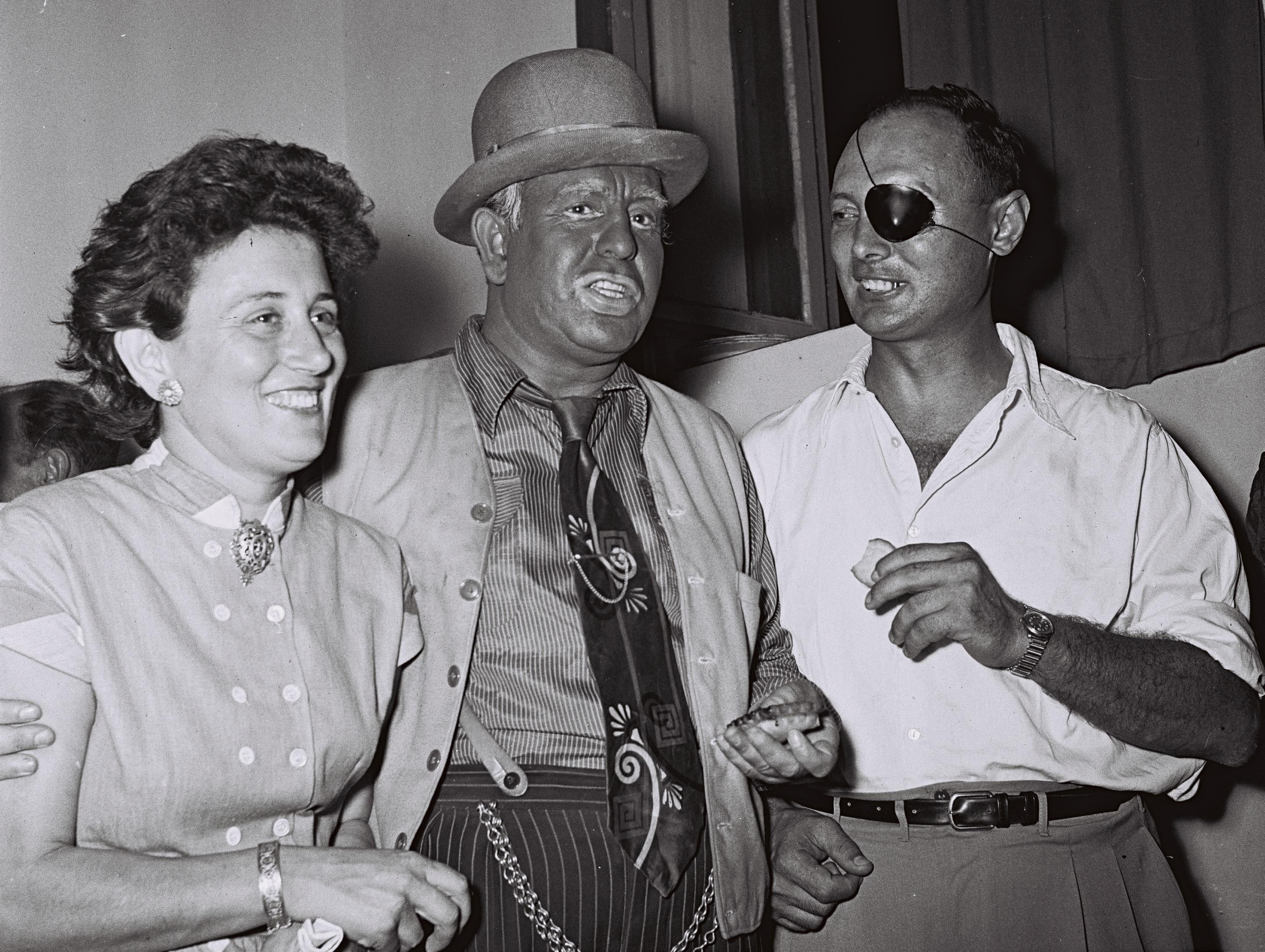
Ruth and Moshe Dayan with a Habima actor, 1953

Dayan was married three times. In 1935, he married Wilhelmina (Miriam) Wagner, an Austrian-Jewish woman, to secure her immigration to Palestine. Later that year, he divorced her and married Ruth Schwartz. He was married to Ruth for 36 years before she divorced him in 1971 due to his numerous extramarital affairs. In the Israeli best-selling book that followed the divorce, Or Did I Dream the Dream?, Ruth Dayan wrote a chapter about "Moshe's bad taste in women". In 1973, two years after the divorce, Dayan married Rachel Korem in a simple ceremony performed by Rabbi Mordechai Piron, the second chief military rabbi of the IDF, at the Pirons' home. The wedding was not announced in advance and Piron had to recruit neighbors to complete a minyan (the 10-man quorum required for a religious ceremony). Dayan humorously told well-wishers that he had no trouble getting a marriage license. "She is divorced and I am divorced. I am no Cohen (priest) and no mamzer (bastard) so there was no trouble." Neither Dayan's daughter and two sons nor Korem's two daughters attended. Dayan left almost his entire estate to Korem in his will.

Moshe's and Ruth's daughter, Yael Dayan, a novelist, is best known in Israel for her book, My Father, His Daughter, about her relationship with her father. She followed him into politics and was a member of several Israeli left-wing parties over the years. She served in the Knesset and on the Tel Aviv City Council, and was a Tel Aviv-Yafo deputy mayor, responsible for social services. One of his sons, Assi Dayan, was an actor and a movie director. Another son, artist and sculptor Ehud "Udi" Dayan, who was cut out of his father's will, wrote a book critical of his father months after he died, mocking his military, writing, and political skills, calling him a philanderer, dismissing his interest in archaeology as a preoccupation with "lousy jars", and accusing him of greed. In his book, Ehud even accused his father of making money from his battle with cancer. He also lamented having recited Kaddish for his father "three times too often for a man who never observed half the Ten Commandments".

== Death and legacy ==
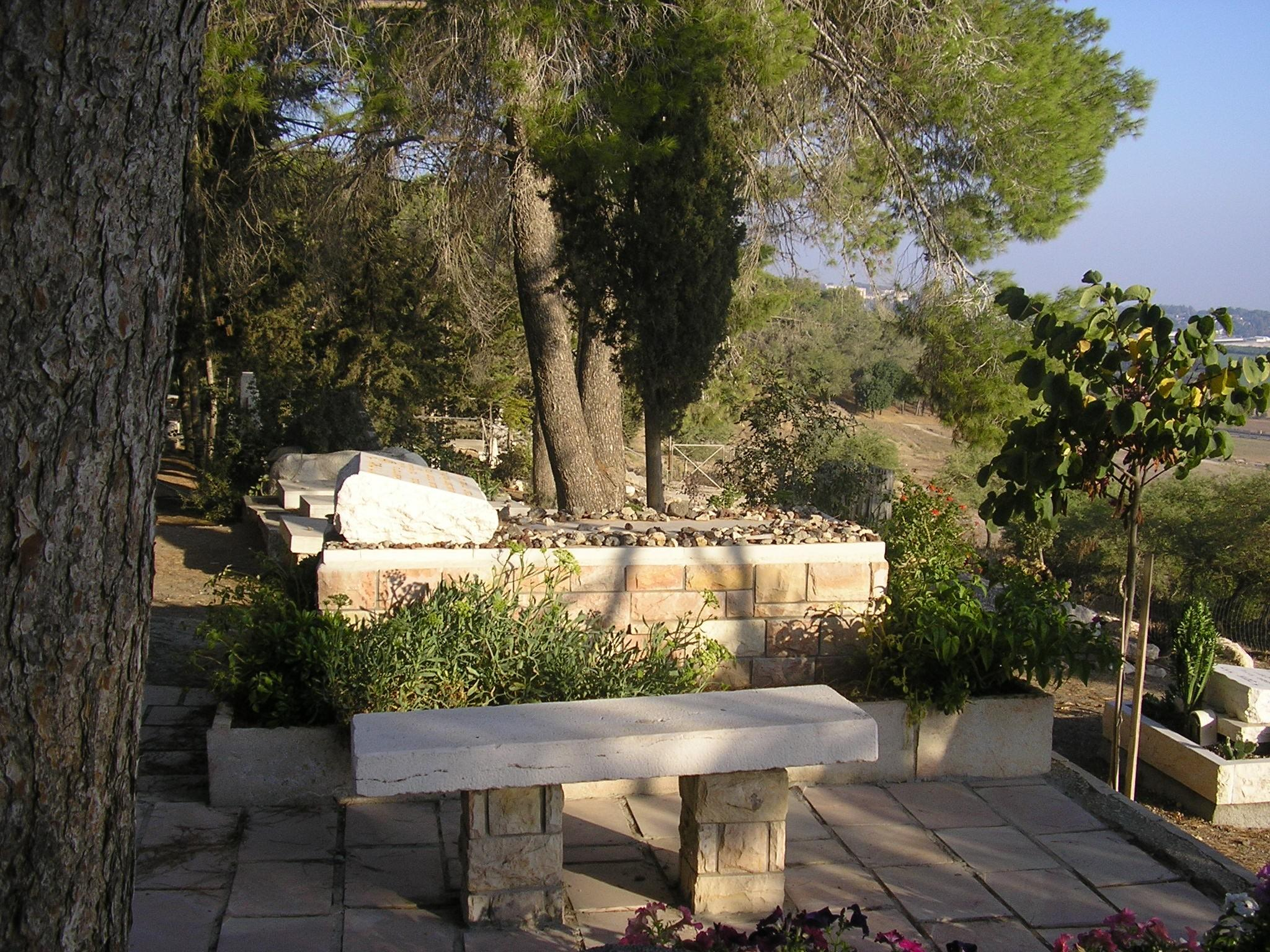
Dayan's grave in the Nahalal Cemetery

In the last years of his life, Dayan was plagued by increasingly ill health. In 1979 he was diagnosed with colon cancer and underwent an operation to remove the tumor, which involved the removal of a small portion of his colon. He had to undergo throat surgery later that year and another operation for a hernia in 1980. Dayan's appearance became increasingly frail and some people who met him during this time noted that his vision seemed to be deteriorating. During the campaign for the 1981 elections his gaunt appearance was noticed by the public.

Dayan's Telem party won two seats in the 30 June 1981 elections, but he died three-and-a-half months later from a heart attack at age 66. Shortly before his death, Dayan was taken to Sheba Medical Center after complaining of chest pains and shortness of breath. His condition further deteriorated in the hospital and he suffered a fatal heart attack. He is buried in Nahalal in the moshav (a collective village) where he was raised. Following his death, the Lubavitcher Rebbe, Rabbi Menachem M. Schneerson, arranged that the yearlong memorial service of kaddish be recited in honor of Dayan. Dayan bequeathed his personal belongings to his bodyguard. In 2005, his eye patch was offered for sale on eBay with a starting bid of US$75,000.

Dayan was a complex character; his opinions were never strictly black and white. He had few close friends; his mental brilliance and charismatic manner were combined with cynicism and lack of restraint. Ariel Sharon noted about Dayan:

He would wake up with a hundred ideas. Of them ninety-five were dangerous; three more had to be rejected; the remaining two, however, were brilliant.

He had courage amounting to insanity, as well as displays of a lack of responsibility. I would not say the same about his civil courage. Once Ben Gurion had asked me—what do I think of the decision to appoint Dayan as the Minister of Agriculture in his government. I said that it is important that Dayan sits in every government because of his brilliant mind—but never as prime minister. Ben Gurion asked: "why not as prime minister?". I replied then: "because he does not accept responsibility".

In 1969, during an address to the students at Technion University in Haifa, Dayan regretted the fact that students are unfamiliar with the Arab villages that once inhabited the land: "We came to this country which was already populated by Arabs, and we are establishing... a Jewish state here. In considerable areas of the country we bought the lands from the Arabs. Jewish villages were built in the place of Arab villages. You do not even know the names of these Arab villages, and I do not blame you, because these geography books no longer exist; not only do the books not exist, the Arab villages are not there either. Nahalal arose in the place of Mahalul, Gevat – in the place of Jibta, Sarid – in the place of Haneifs and Kefar Yehoshua – in the place of Tell Shaman. There is no one place built in this country that did not have a former Arab population."

Dayan combined a kibbutznik's secular identity and pragmatism with a deep love and appreciation for the Hebrew Bible, the Jewish people and the land of Israel—but not an orthodox religious identification. In one recollection, having seen rabbis flocking on the Temple Mount shortly after Jerusalem was captured in 1967, he asked, "What is this? The Vatican?" Dayan later ordered to give administrative control of the Temple Mount over to the Waqf, a Muslim council.

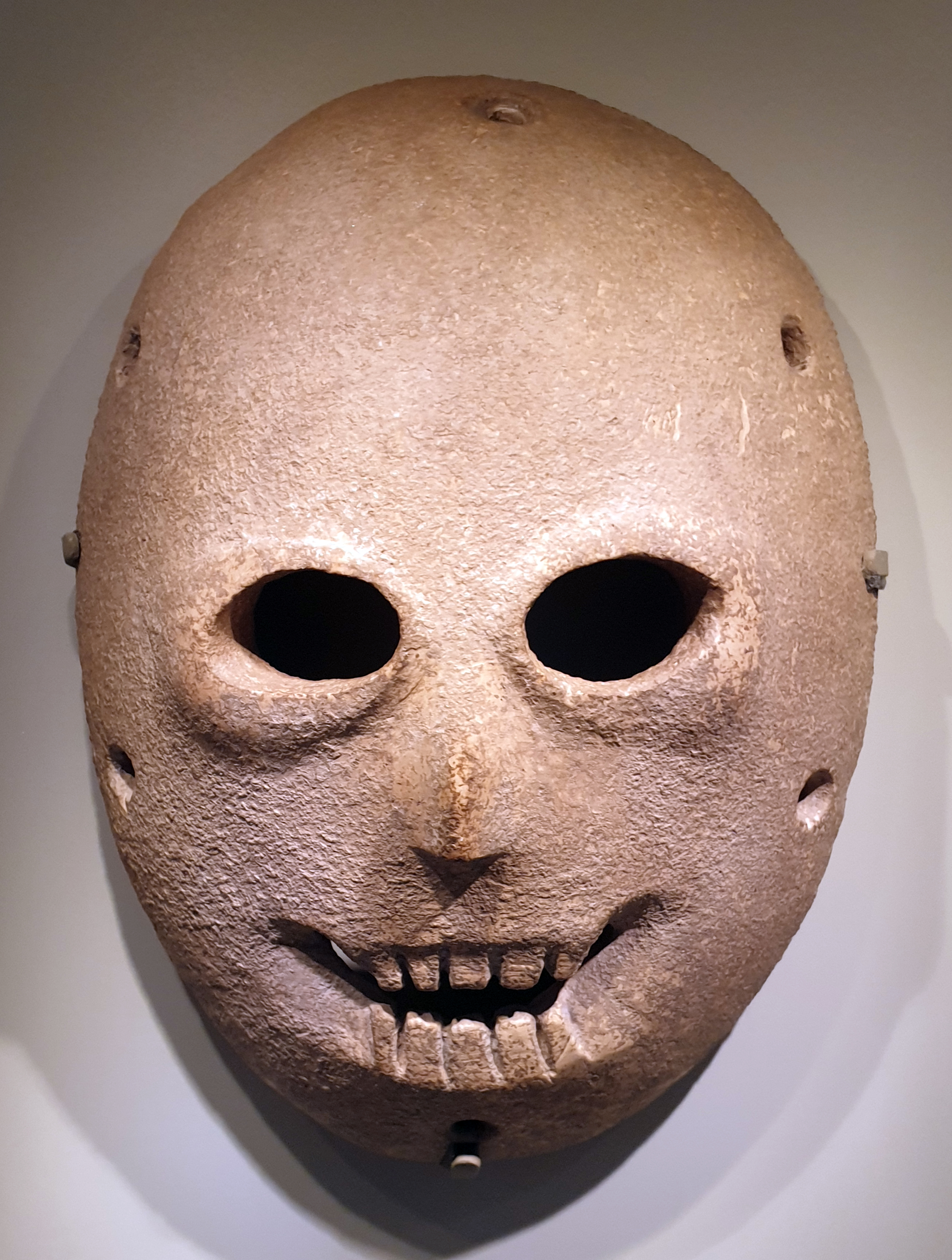
Pre-Pottery Neolithic B Mask, acquired by Dayan from Hirbat Duma, presently in Israel Museum

Dayan was an author and described himself as an amateur archaeologist, the latter hobby leading to significant controversy, as his amassing of historical artifacts, often with the help of his soldiers, seemed to be in breach of a number of laws. Yigael Yadin remarked after one incident: "I know who did it, and I am not going to say who it is, but if I catch him, I'll poke out his other eye, too." Some of his activities in this regard, whether illegal digging, looting of sites, or commerce of antiquities, have been detailed by Raz Kletter from the Israel Antiquities Authority. Following Dayan's death his widow sold his collection of antiquities to the Israel Museum for US$1 million. This prompted debate about the ethics of purchasing illegally acquired antiquities.

American science-fiction writer Poul Anderson published his novel Ensign Flandry at the time when Moshe Dayan's international renown and admiration for him in Israel were at their highest. The far-future Galactic Empire described in the book includes a planet called "Dayan", inhabited by Jews.

== Awards and decorations ==

War of Independence Ribbon	Operation Kadesh Ribbon	Legion of Honour (Grand Officer)

== Published works ==
- Diary of the Sinai Campaign, 1967 (paperback reprint: Da Capo Press, 1991, ISBN 978-0-306-80451-9)
- Living with the Bible: A Warrior's Relationship with the Land of His Forebears, Steimatzky's Agency Ltd, 1978, ASIN B0021OXHOO1978
- Story of My Life, William Morrow and Company, 1976, ISBN 978-0-688-03076-6
- Breakthrough: A Personal Account of the Egypt-Israel Peace Negotiations, Random House, 1981, ISBN 978-0-394-51225-9
- Mapah Hadasha – Yehassim Acherim (A New Map – A Different Relationship), 1968/1969.
