= Battle of 'Auja =

Military engagement between Israel and Egypt

Coordinates: 30°53′10″N 34°25′21″E

The Battle of 'Auja, also called Battle of Nitzana, was a military engagement between the Israel Defense Forces and the Egyptian Army in and around 'Auja (today Nitzana), a small village on the Egypt–Israel border. It was fought on December 26–27, 1948, as part of Operation Horev, an Israeli campaign meant to expel all Egyptian forces from the country. The first stage of the operation was the simultaneous capture of 18 Egyptian positions on the Beersheba–'Auja road, including 7 around 'Auja.

The attack was conducted by 8th Brigade forces, reinforced by troops from the Harel Brigade. It started with maneuvers to the north of 'Auja, which bogged down the Israeli forces that only began the actual assault on December 26. The battle was won in the afternoon of December 27, but only on the morning of December 28 did the 8th Brigade take the two final positions, completing the capture of all 18.

== Background ==
The third and final stage of the 1948 Arab–Israeli War started on October 15, 1948, when Israel launched Operation Yoav on the southern front. While the Israelis made significant tactical and strategic gains in Operation Yoav, the political situation changed little and Egypt was still dragging its feet on proposed armistice talks. Operation Horev was therefore launched in the south with the final aim of expelling all Egyptian forces from Palestine. The main thrust of the operation was planned to be the eastern arm of the Egyptian forces ('Auja-Bir Asluj) with a final aim of cutting the western wing of the Egyptian army off from the bulk of its forces in Israel, by entering the Sinai Peninsula. It was the largest operation launched by the Israelis during the 1948 Arab–Israeli War.

The Israeli Southern Command, commanded by Yigal Allon, outlined a total of 18 positions from north to south that needed to be captured. The first seven of them were on the Bir-Asluj-'Auja road, with position 3–5 overlooking 'Auja itself.

The operation had the Israelis cut the road into 3 parts, by launching units at (north to south): Bir 'Asluj, al Mushrife and 'Auja.

'Auja, also known as 'Auja al-Hafir, was an administrative center built by the Ottoman Empire on the Egypt–Palestine border between 1908 and 1915. It was also the terminus of the Ottoman southern railway in Palestine, which extended to Kusseima in the Sinai, Peninsula.

== Prelude ==
The Israeli force allocated for the conquest of 'Auja consisted of the 8th Armored Brigade—the 82nd Armored Battalion, including four medium tanks, 12 armored vehicles and a mechanized company; the 89th Commando Battalion, including two mechanized companies and two motorized companies; and the 88th Support Battalion that included twelve 3" mortars. These forces were reinforced by the 5th Battalion from the Harel Brigade and an artillery contingent consisting of eight 75 mm cannons, three 120 mm heavy mortars and a battery of anti-tank guns.

The Egyptian garrison consisted of a reinforced 1st Infantry Battalion, including a battery of 3.7" mountain guns. 'Auja's defenses were mainly concentrated in the east, facing Beersheba, because the northwestern path of Wadi 'Auja was considered impassable to vehicles. Therefore, the Israelis decided to attack from the wadi.

On the night of December 24–25, Israeli engineers prepared an ancient Roman road from Halasa to Ruheiba, northwest of 'Auja. However, parts of the planned movement path were not prepared. The 8th and Harel Brigade forces left Ruheiba at 18:00 on December 25. They turned west at Wadi al-Abyad, north of 'Auja. No engineering work was done in the last 3 km of the wadi, and the brigade got bogged down in its advance.

They only got out of this situation, with the help of tractors, in the morning of December 26. A contingent, including the 88th Battalion and a company from the Harel Brigade, went north to block possible reinforcements from the Gaza corridor, while the rest went south to 'Auja. At 07:00, Israeli Harvard aircraft bombed 'Auja, dropping sixteen 50 kg bombs and alerting the Egyptians of the impending attack.

== Battle ==
The Israelis advanced in two columns: the 82nd Battalion in the west through Wadi 'Auja and the 89th Battalion in the east through the Rafah–'Auja road. The battle began at 14:00 on December 26, when the 82nd Battalion assaulted and captured Position 3 in the north. In order to expedite the capture to free up his forces for the march of the Sinai, the 8th Brigade commander Yitzhak Sadeh ordered a motorized company from the 89th Battalion to attack the tell of 'Auja (Position 5) from the well-defended main road. The company suffered heavy casualties, including six dead, from anti-tank fire and retreated. Its commander, Ya'akov "Dov" Garnek, was killed in the attack. Meanwhile, an Egyptian column from Rafah engaged the Israeli blocking force to the north but retreated after losing five armored vehicles. The Israelis suffered two dead.

At this point, the Israeli Southern Command began implementing its backup plan should the 8th Brigade fail to take 'Auja, and sent some of the Negev Brigade forces that participated in the Battle of Bir 'Asluj to the area. This despite the fact that the 8th Brigade had prepared for this eventuality and had a plan to defend itself against an Egyptian counterattack. The 9th Battalion of the Negev Brigade set out to capture the Egyptian positions at al Mushrife (between Bir Thamila and 'Auja), but encountered no resistance.

In the morning of the December 27, the 82nd Battalion moved south and captured Position 4, between the village and the border, thus disconnecting 'Auja's positions from Egypt. An Egyptian column that attempted to come to 'Auja's rescue from Rafah was intercepted by the blocking force to the north, although they initially got through the area meant to be manned by the Harel Brigade, who were late in arriving at the location due to logistical problems. Another column from Abu 'Ageila was intercepted by the 82nd Battalion.

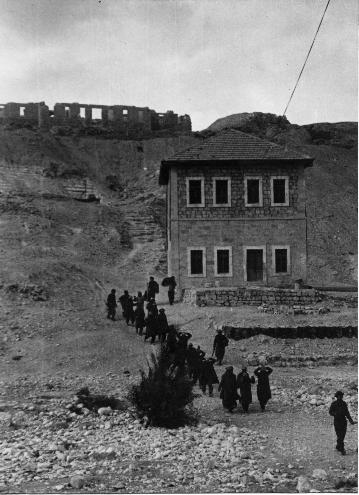
Egyptian soldiers taken prisoner 28 December 1948

Most of the 8th Brigade, supported from the air by Harvard planes and a Beaufighter bomber, then continued to the tell and the village, which they had nearly surrounded. The 82nd Battalion took the tell, while the 89th was stopped by Egyptian aerial bombardment at 07:45, losing two soldiers. They sent a second wave which moved along the Ottoman railway tracks and broke through the defenses, and at the same time, the 82nd Battalion entered the village as well. The Egyptian garrison surrendered at 12:36. In the morning of December 28, the Israeli forces regrouped and set out to clear the area, capturing positions 1 and 2 on the border.

== Aftermath and significance ==
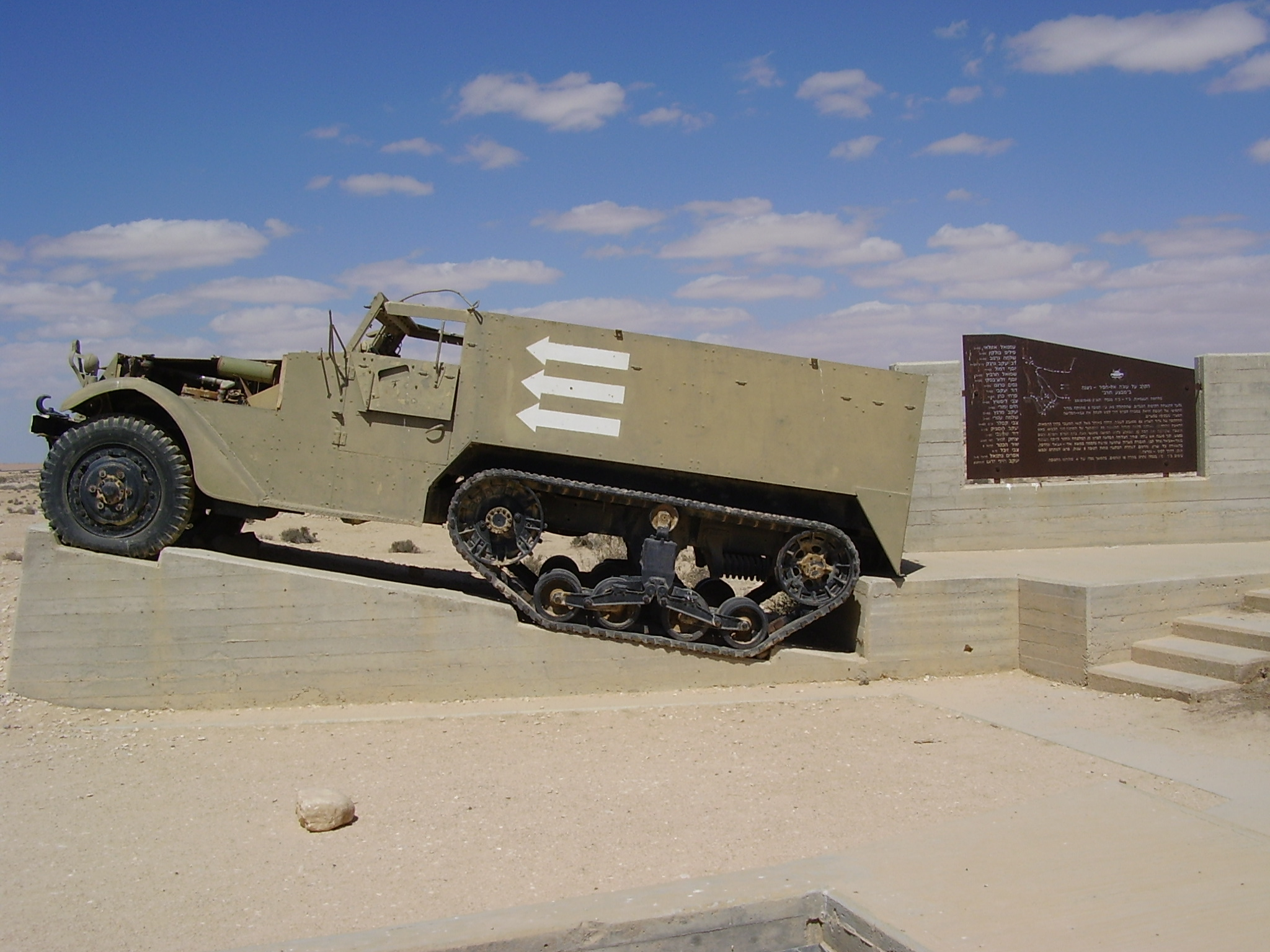
Memorial for the fallen Israeli soldiers in the Battle of 'Auja

The battles of 'Auja, Bir 'Asluj and Bir Thamila triggered a complete withdrawal of Egyptian forces along the Beersheba–'Auja road. The Negev Brigade was able to destroy two Humber armored vehicles and capture six, as well as 20 supply trucks, in the area of Mushrife. Tens of other vehicles escaped south to Egypt. Many Egyptian soldiers, including officers, who retreated on foot, surrendered themselves to Israeli forces after not finding food and shelter in the cold weather. The remaining Egyptian forces that reassembled in the Sinai, under Brigadier General Fouad Thabet, were preparing for a counterattack, but as they advanced, an order was given to withdraw.

The Egyptian Muslim Brotherhood officer Kamal Ismail ash-Sharif commented that the Battle of 'Auja marked the end for the Egyptian campaign in Palestine, and henceforth his army had to fight on Egyptian land. According to Chaim Herzog, the Egyptian eastern wing completely fell apart after the battle, although this was not clear in Egypt or around the world at the time, as the Egyptian government claimed victory.

The capture of 'Auja also enabled the Israeli army to send its forces into the Sinai Peninsula with the objective of surrounding and eventually expelling the Egyptian army from Israel. The crossing of the Egypt–Israel border gave a significant morale boost to the Israelis; according to a local eyewitness, many of the soldiers cried for joy and stopped their vehicles to kiss the ground. The Negev Brigade and the 82nd Battalion were sent into the peninsula. Due to international pressure however, all Israeli forces eventually withdrew.

After the war, 'Auja and its surrounding area became a demilitarized zone. Following a series of incidents and skirmishes, 'Auja was recaptured by Israel in 1955 in Operation Volcano.
