= Operation Volcano (Israeli raid) =

1955 Israeli military operation

- Part of the Retribution operations (during Palestinian Fedayeen insurgency)
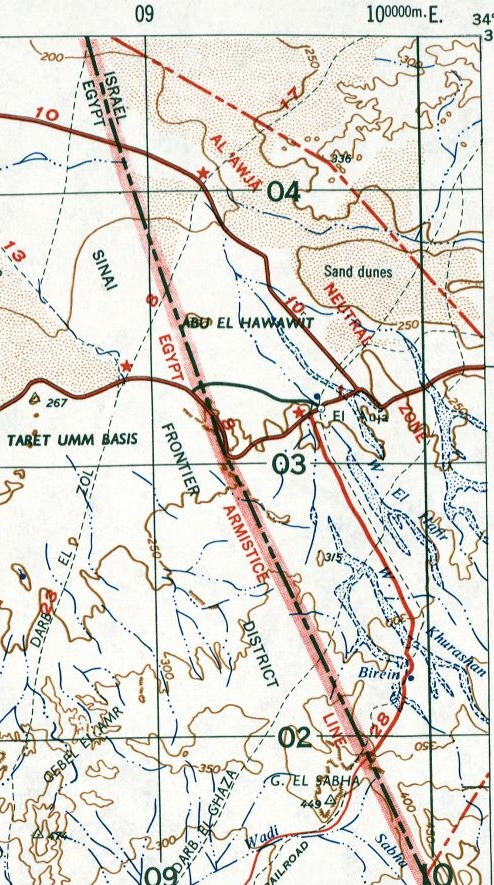
Date	November 2–3, 1955
Location	Nitzana, Demilitarized Zone, Israeli-Egyptian border
Result	Israeli victory
Territorial changes	Israel annex Nitzana

Belligerents
Israel	Egypt

Commanders and leaders
Moshe Dayan; Ariel Sharon; Uri Bar-Ratzon; Haim Ben-David	

Units involved
Golani Brigade; 890th Battalion, Paratroopers Brigade	11th Battalion

Casualties and losses
6 killed and 37 wounded	81 killed and 55 captured. Large amount of weapons and ammunition
- Sources mention only 5 fatalities on the Israeli side. However, these numbers do not include Corporal Aryeh Levy, who died of his wounds later on, on November 6.

Operation Volcano (Hebrew: מבצע הר געש, Mivtza Har Ga'ash), also known as Operation Sabcha, was a large-scale Israel Defense Forces (IDF) military operation carried out on the night of November 2–3, 1955 against Egyptian military positions in and around the Nitzana/Auja vicinity. The operation was successful and resulted in the permanent expulsion of Egyptian forces from the Demilitarized Zone. Eighty-one Egyptian soldiers were killed and fifty-five others were taken prisoner. There were six Israeli fatalities.

== Background ==
IDF troops near Auja during Operation Horev

El-Auja, also known in Hebrew as Nitzana, is a strategic location that sits along the border between Israel and Egypt. It contains a network of four major road arteries, one of which leads directly into Israel toward the vicinity of Be'er Sheva, and three of which lead into Sinai, Egypt. During the 1948 Arab-Israeli war, Egypt invaded Israel through this region. On December 22, 1948 Israeli forces launched a counter-offensive, code-named Operation Horev, against the Egyptians and succeeded in ejecting them from Nitzana. On November 24, 1949 Israel and Egypt signed an armistice whereby the Nitzana region, situated in Israel, was declared a demilitarized zone. The armistice agreement also stipulated that on the Egyptian side of the border "no Egyptian defensive positions shall be closer to El Auja than El Qouseima and Abou Aoueigila." Different interpretations soon arose between Egypt and Israel concerning sovereignty rights in the demilitarized zone which invariably led to a number of border incidents, some of which resulted in fatalities. Egypt believed that the Nitzana demilitarized zone belonged to neither Israel nor Egypt. Israel contended that the zone's demilitarized status did not affect Israel's sovereignty over it and that Nitzana was an integral part of Israel.

In 1953 Israel established the Nahal settlement of Givat Rachel in the zone. Though a violation of the armistice, it proved an effective counter-measure to Bedouin smuggling and Egyptian sponsored fedayeen infiltrations and sabotage operations. A smaller Israeli post just south of Givat Rachel was established in Be'erotaim. These were the only two Israeli positions in the Nitzana/Auja region. In early 1955, Israel, in coordination with Egyptian officials, began marking the border with Egypt in the Nitzana/Auja vicinity. The task was completed on August 5, 1955 and Israel regarded these borders as permanent. However, following the marking of the border, it became clear that two Egyptian positions were within Israeli territory, a claim corroborated by United Nations officials. Egypt nevertheless refused to recognize the newly placed markers and destroyed them in early September 1955. On September 21, Israel sent a force into the zone and evicted Egyptian military personnel stationed adjacent to the UN headquarters, injuring two. The IDF vacated the zone after securing an agreement from the Egyptians not to interfere with the border marking endeavor. However, Egypt now demanded the expulsion of all Israeli presence, civilian as well as military, from the demilitarized zone in order to establish facts concerning sovereignty.

== Battle ==
By October 1955 tensions along the Egyptian-Israeli border were palpably high. Egypt had initiated a blockade of the Gulf of Eilat, preventing Israeli shipping from entering. It had also signed a military pact with Syria and announced a major arms deal with the Soviets that according to U.S. intelligence estimates, "substantially increased the risk of Egyptian-Israeli hostilities." In addition, Egypt continued to sponsor fedayeen terrorist infiltrations into Israel. Against this backdrop, tensions rose significantly with an Egyptian raid on October 26 against the small Israeli post at Be'erotaim that resulted in the killing of one Israeli soldier and the capture of two others. In addition, a large force of Egyptian soldiers reinforced with artillery, armor and anti-aircraft cannon, took up positions on both sides of the demilitarized zone near Sabcha and Ras-Siram. Elements of the Egyptian force penetrated one kilometer into Israeli territory and entrenched themselves near a strategic hill, code-named “Lilly” by the Israelis. Israel's response to the Egyptian provocation was swift but took place in an unexpected sector. On October 28–29, a force of some 200 IDF soldiers under the command of Ariel Sharon attacked an Egyptian military position at Kuntilla, one-hundred miles south of the Nitzana/Auja demilitarized zone, near the Israeli port of Eilat. The Egyptian post was destroyed. Twelve Egyptian soldiers were killed and another twenty-nine were taken prisoner for the loss of two Israelis. The Kuntilla raid, code-named Operation Egged, merely served as a diversion for the main Israeli assault on Egyptian emplacements in and around Sabcha.

Operation Volcano began on November 2 at 20:00 hrs. A force of paratroops from the 890th Battalion augmented by a Nahal company attacked the Egyptian emplacements at Sachba while units from the Golani Brigade's 12th Battalion attacked Egyptian emplacements at Ras-Siram. The attack was supported by mortar and artillery fire. The mission was completed in the early morning hours of November 3 and all the targeted Egyptian emplacements were destroyed. Eighty-one Egyptian soldiers were killed while another fifty-five were captured. The Israelis suffered five fatalities. Large quantities of Egyptian weaponry fell into Israeli hands including 22 military vehicles of various types, anti-aircraft and anti-tank guns, heavy machine guns, mortars, light arms and communications equipment.

== Aftermath ==
Operation Volcano was an unmitigated military success and represented the largest Israeli military undertaking since the 1948 Arab-Israeli war. It also represented another humiliation for the Egyptians in a string of military setbacks beginning with Operation Black Arrow in February 1955. The defeat at Sabcha did not dissuade President Nasser from declaring victory over the Israelis and paying tribute to "the heroes of the battle at el-Sabcha." Nasser flew correspondents to the battle site and attempted to convince them, without success, that the bodies of dead Egyptians strewn about the battlefield were actually Israelis. A skeptical press corps remained unconvinced by Egyptian propaganda claims. Operation Volcano put to an end, once and for all, Egyptian military encroachments into the Demilitarized Zone and established Israel's sovereignty over the Nitzana/Auja region.
