= Operation Egged =

1955 Israeli military operation

- Part of the Retribution operations (Palestinian Fedayeen insurgency)
Date	October 28–29, 1955
Location	Kuntilla, Sinai
Result	Israeli victory

Belligerents
Israel	Egypt

Commanders and leaders
Moshe Dayan; Ariel Sharon	

Casualties and losses
2 killed	12 killed 29 captured

Operation Egged (Hebrew: מִבְצָע אֶגֶד), also known as the Kuntilla operation, was an Israeli military operation carried out on night of October 28–29, 1955 that targeted an Egyptian military post at Kuntilla, located in northeastern Sinai. The operation was a success and resulted in the destruction of the post. Twelve Egyptian soldiers were killed and twenty-nine were taken prisoner. There were two Israeli fatalities.

== Background ==
On October 26, 1955 Egyptian forces raided a small Israeli outpost at Be'erotayim, located in the southern sector of the Nitzana/El-Auja demilitarized zone. One Israel Defense Forces (IDF) soldier was killed and two were captured. Concurrent with this action, sizable Egyptian forces took control of positions in the southern corner of the Demilitarized Zone near El-Sabcha. Elements of this force also penetrated one kilometer into Israeli territory and occupied positions near a strategic hill, which the Israelis code-named "Lilly".

== The battle ==
Moshe Dayan, Israel’s Chief of Staff, authorized an immediate retaliation for the Egyptian border transgression but in an entirely different sector. The chosen target was an Egyptian military post near Kuntilla, one-hundred miles south of the Demilitarized Zone. On the night of October 28–29, 1955 two-hundred paratroopers commanded by Ariel Sharon attacked the Kuntilla post killing twelve Egyptian soldiers and capturing twenty-nine others. The post was leveled. Two Israeli soldiers, Yaakov Mizrahi and Amnon Abukai, were killed. Both were issued posthumous medals (Mizrahi for "Valor" and Abukai for "Courage") for their daring conduct during the assault.

== Aftermath ==
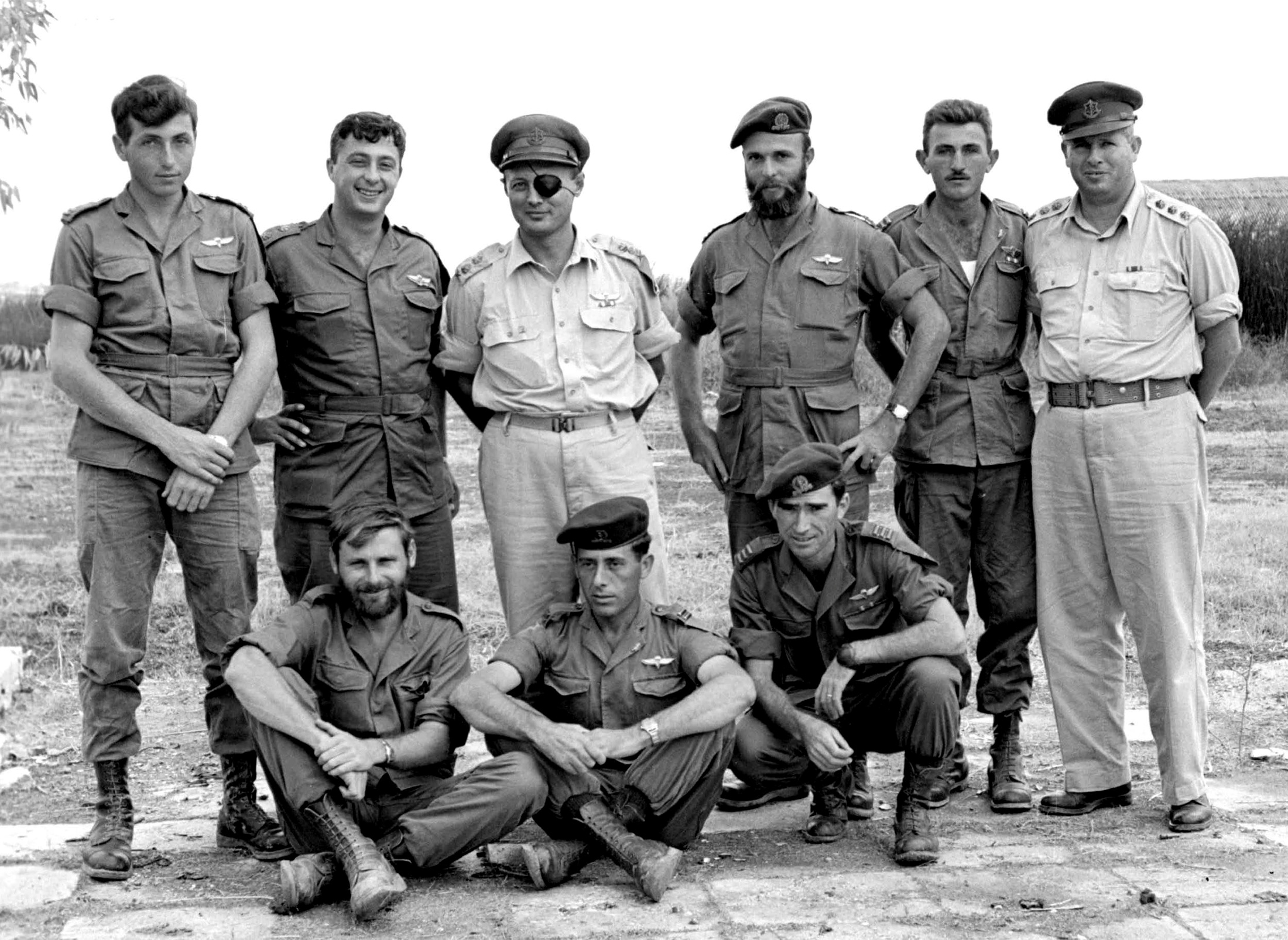
Israeli commanders pose after Operation Egged. Standing left to right: Lt. Meir Har-Zion, Maj. Ariel Sharon, Lt. Gen. Moshe Dayan, Capt. Danny Matt, Lt. Moshe Efron, Col. Asaf Simhoni; crouching, left to right: Capt. Aharon Davidi, Lt. Yaakov Yaakov, Capt. Rafael Eitan

Operation Egged merely served as a diversion for the main Israeli assault which was ultimately directed at Egyptian positions in and around El-Sachba. The ruse worked. On the night of November 2–3, Israel initiated Operation Volcano. Israeli paratroopers as well as additional infantry from the Golani and Nahal Brigades attacked Egyptian positions at El-Sabcha, killing eighty-one Egyptian soldiers and capturing fifty-five others. Following the Sabcha operation, there were no more Egyptian incursions into the Demilitarized Zone.
