= Auja al-Hafir =

Ottoman outpost and Palestinian village

Auja al-Hafir عوجة الحفير El Audja
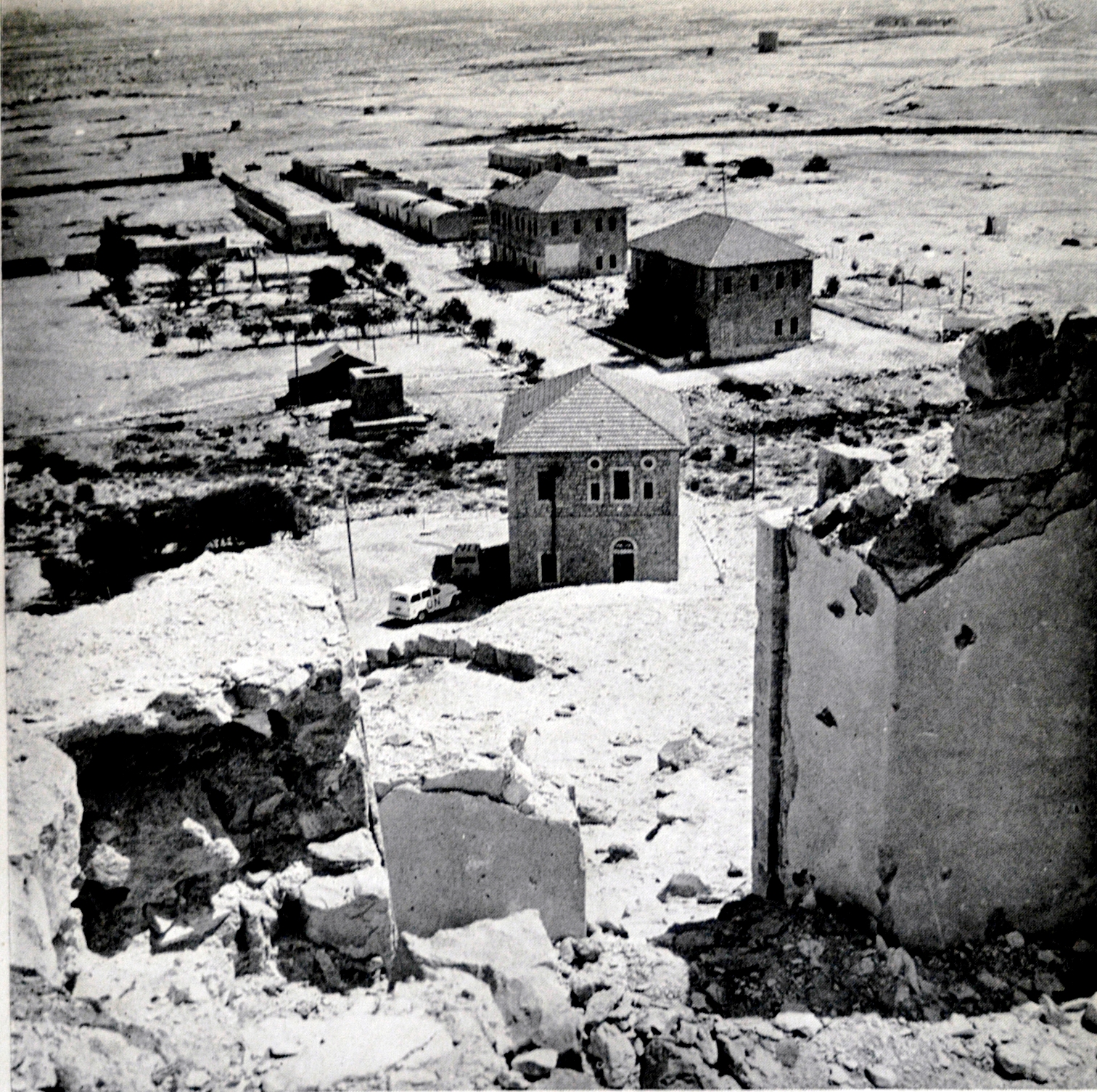
- Interactive map of Auja al-Hafir
- Coordinates: 30°52′27″N 34°26′13″E
- Geopolitical entity: Mandatory Palestine
- Subdistrict: Beersheba
- Date of depopulation: 1967-06-10

Population (1948)
  - Total: 48 + 3,500 'Azazme
- Cause(s) of depopulation: Military assault by Yishuv forces
- Current Localities: Nessana

Auja al-Hafir (Arabic: عوجة الحفير, also Auja) was an ancient road junction close to water wells in the western Negev and eastern Sinai. It was the traditional grazing land of the 'Azazme tribe. The border crossing between Egypt and Ottoman/British Palestine, about 60 km (37 mi) south of Gaza, was situated there. Today it is the site of Nitzana and the Ktzi'ot prison in the Southern District of Israel.

== Etymology ==
Other sources name the locality el-Audja, 'Uja al-Hafeer, El Auja el Hafir and variations thereof.

A‘waj means "bent" in Arabic, and "Al-Auja" is a common name for meandering streams (the Yarkon River in Israel and a smaller stream near Jericho on the West Bank both are called Al-Auja in Arabic).

"Hafir" means a water reservoir built to catch runoff water at the base of a slope; in Sudan it can also mean a drainage ditch.

== History ==
=== 2nd century BCE to 7th century CE ===
Pottery remains found in the area date back to the 2nd century BC. and are associated with the traces of massive foundations of an unknown building probably of Nabataean construction. The area appears to have remained under the Nabatean sphere of influence, outside the Hasmonaean and Herodian Kingdoms, until AD 105 when Trajan annexed the Nabataean Kingdom. A large rectangular hill-top fort probably dates from the 4th century AD. A church and associated buildings have been dated as having been built before AD 464. Auja al-Hafir was struck by the great plague which swept the Eastern Mediterranean around AD 541. During the 1930s a large number of papyri, dating from the 6th and 7th century, were found. One of them is from the local Arab governor granting Christian inhabitants freedom of worship on payment of the appropriate tax. After AD 700 the town appears to have lost its settled population, possibly due to changing rainfall patterns.

=== Late Ottoman period ===
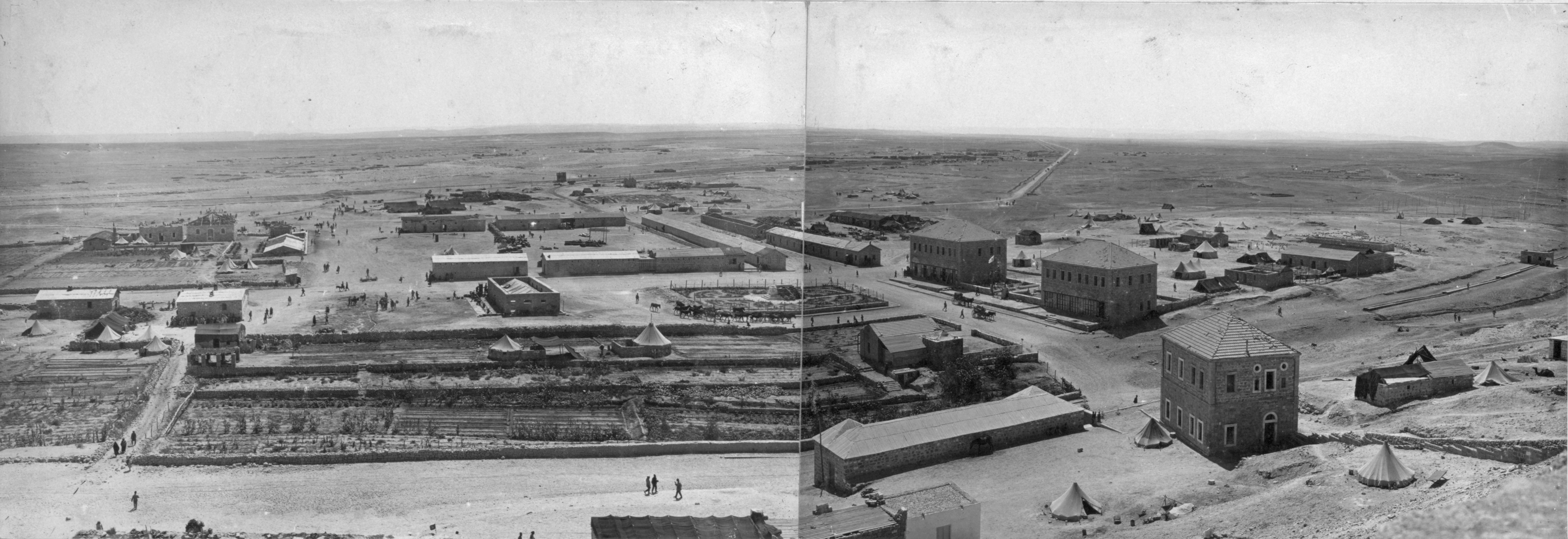
Ottoman military base, 1915

'Auja al-Hafir lay in a tract of 604 dunams privately owned by the Turkish sultan Abdul Hamid II. After the establishment of Beersheba as the main regional center, the governor of Jerusalem Ekram Bey planned for a new city at al-Hafir, 10km to the west of 'Auja, but decided to establish it instead at 'Auja and give it the combined name of 'Auja al-Hafir. A new Kaza was established there. A barracks, inn and a government office were built, and a police station was raised in 1902. From 1905 to 1915 the Ottoman authorities built a railroad, as well as a large administrative centre complete with an apartment building for the clerks.

However, the town didn't develop until it became an outpost on the Egyptian front during World War I. In mid-January, 1915, a Turkish Army force of 20,000 entered Sinai by way of El-Auja on an unsuccessful expedition against the Suez Canal. At this time most of the dressed stone was taken from the ancient buildings for building work in Gaza.

=== British Mandate ===
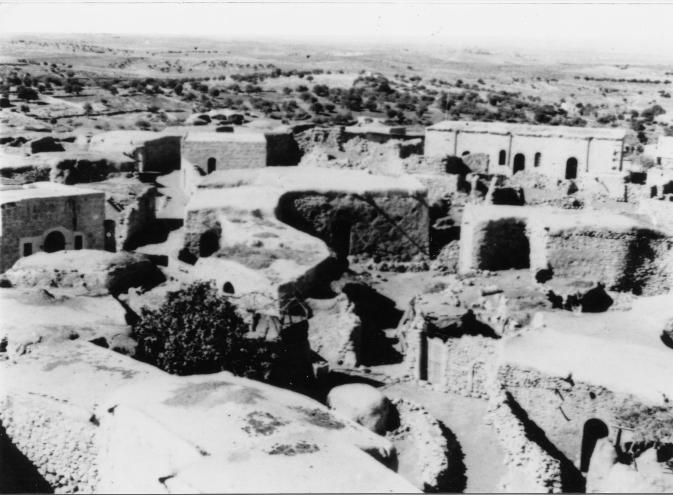
Civilian village at Auja al Hafir. 1948

==== Significance ====
The central route across the desert to the Suez Canal crossed from El Auja to Ismailia, until 1948 this was the only paved road between Palestine and Egypt.

==== Population; partition plan ====
During the British Mandate of Palestine, El Auja was part of the District of Beersheba.

According to the 1931 census Auja al-Hafir had a population of 29 inhabitants, all Muslims, living in 9 houses, in addition to 35 people living at the police post.

An elementary school was established by the Mandate Government, but closed in 1932 due to insufficient and irregular attendance. It was reopened in 1945 at tribal expense and had 23 pupils.

In 1947, 'Auja al-Hafir was granted an official Town Planning Scheme.

According to the United Nations Partition Plan for Palestine, the area was designated as part of the Arab state.

==== Arab revolt; prison camp ====
The local population were not involved in the disturbances of 1929 and 1936 but there was some disorder in the summer of 1938.

At the start of the 1936 disturbances the British Mandate authorities used Auja as a prison camp for arrested Palestinian Arab leaders including Awny Abdul Hadi. It was also used to hold Jewish Communists who were being deported. The prisoners were later transferred to the army base at Sarafand.

=== 1948 Arab–Israeli War ===
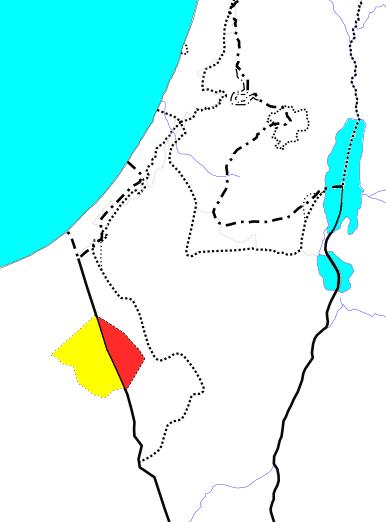
Al 'Awja Neutral Zone

In 1948 the Egyptian Army used the area as a military base. In the Battle of 'Auja, a campaign of the 1948 Arab–Israeli War, it was captured by the 89th Mechanized Commando Battalion of Israel, which had an English-speaking platoon of volunteers from England, Germany, the Netherlands, Rhodesia, South Africa, and the U.S.

=== DMZ and Israeli control ===
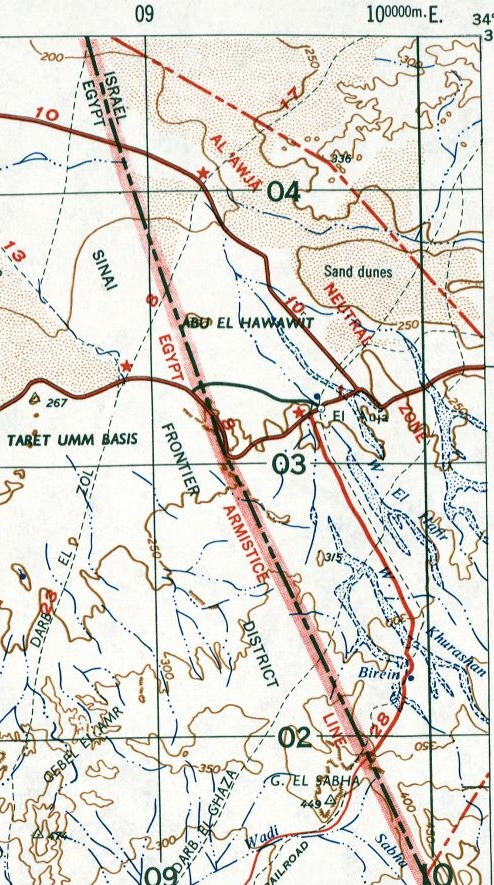
"Al 'Awjā Neutral Zone". US Army Map Service, 1953 status

As a result of the 1949 Armistice Agreements, the area around the village, known as the al-Auja Zone, became a 145 km^{2} (36,000 acres) demilitarized zone (DMZ), with compliance monitored by the United Nations Truce Supervision Organization (UNTSO). On 28 September 1953 the Israeli army established a fortified settlement, Ktzi'ot, overlooking the al-Auja junction. The first name given to this Nahal outpost was Giv'at Ruth -named after the nearby Tell-abu-Rutha. Despite a recent request for compliance with the armistice and over the objections of UNTSO Chief of Staff Burns and UN Secretary General Hammarskjöld, Israel re-militarized the area on September 21, 1955. Israel continued to occupy the area until after its withdrawal from Sinai and Gaza, which ended the 1956 Suez Crisis.

Between 1956 and the 1967 Six-Day War, the DMZ and the border were monitored by the United Nations Emergency Force.

Israel has controlled the area since 1967, and has there a large military base and a detention camp, the Ktzi'ot Prison.

== See also ==
- Nitzana Border Crossing
- Battles of Bir 'Asluj
- Nitzana (Nabataean city)
- Operation Volcano

== Bibliography ==
- Abu-Rab'ia, 'Aref (2001). A Bedouin Century. Berghahn Books.
- Burns, E. L. M (1962). Between Arab and Israeli. George G. Harrap.
- Israel Unit in Neutral Zone, Strategic Village Occupied, The Times, September 21, 1955, page 8.
- Mills, E., ed. (1932). Census of Palestine 1931. Population of Villages, Towns and Administrative Areas. Jerusalem: Government of Palestine.
- Ending Strife in Auja Zone, Egypt Accepts U.N. Plan, Mr. Hammarskjöld's Statement, The Times, January 25, 1956, page 8.
