= Battles of Bir 'Asluj =

Series of battles in the 1948 Arab-Israeli War

Coordinates: 31°0′14″N 34°46′45″E

The Battles of Bir 'Asluj refer to a series of military engagements between Israel and Egypt in the 1948 Arab–Israeli War, around the localities Bir 'Asluj and the nearby Bir Thamila (also Bir Tamila or Bir Tmileh). Bir 'Asluj was a small Bedouin center and a strategic location on the 'Auja–Beersheba road. The Israelis captured the position early in the war, in an attempt to disconnect the Egyptian Muslim Brotherhood forces from the main Egyptian Army concentration on the coastal plain, but set up positions across the road and the threat to their transport was neutralized.

The entire vicinity of Bir 'Asluj, including Bir Thamila, was captured by Israeli Negev Brigade forces on December 25–26, 1948, during Operation Horev. In the first stage, the 7th Battalion took Bir Thamila, but failed to reach the road and retreated with heavy losses. In the morning, armored vehicles from the 9th Battalion assaulted the Egyptian road positions and captured them. This was later followed by the conquest of the entire road to the border at 'Auja, expelling the Egyptian forces from Israel in this region.

== Background ==
Bir 'Asluj was a small center of the Azzazma Bedouin tribe, with a mosque, market, water well, mill and police station. It was strategically located on a curve in the road from Sinai Peninsula, through 'Auja, to Be'er Sheva, Hebron and Jerusalem. The old Railway to Beersheba built by the Ottoman Empire in World War I was nearby. During the British Mandate, a British military base and a police station were located next to Bir 'Asluj. The road in question was used by the invading Egyptian army in the 1948 Arab–Israeli War for transport as its eastern wing into Hebron-Jerusalem corridor.

During the 1947–1948 Civil War in Mandatory Palestine, Bir 'Asluj was used as a base of operations for Bedouin paramilitary forces under Hajj Sa'id, mainly against the nearby Jewish villages of Revivim and Haluza, a few kilometers to the northwest. A Muslim Brotherhood unit situated itself in Bir 'Asluj on May 17, 1948.

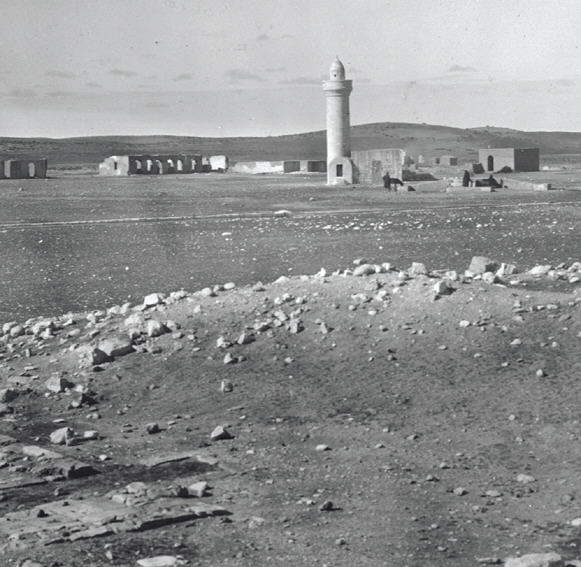
Bir Asjul 1938

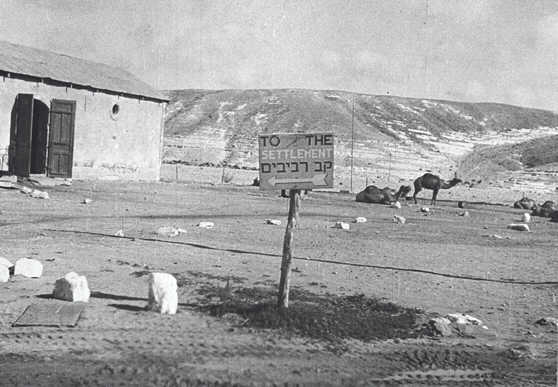
Asluj 1946, signpost to Revivim

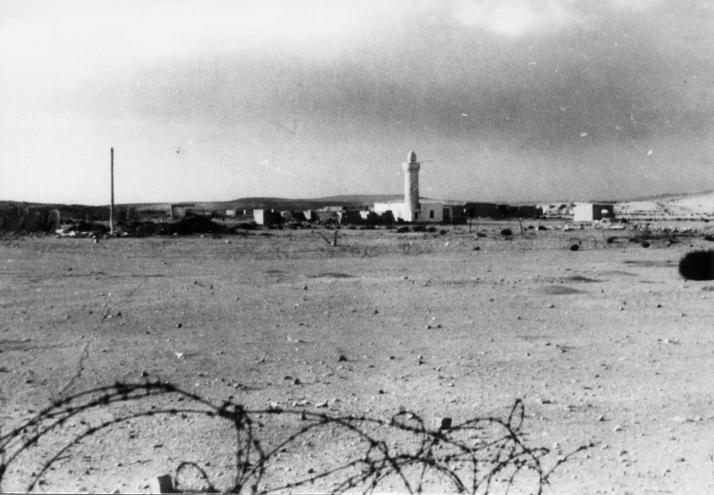
Bir Asjul 6 October 1948

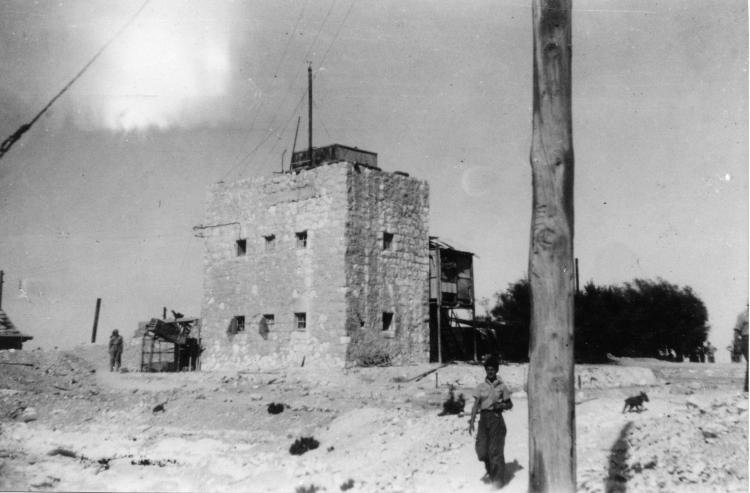
Bir 'Asluj police station.1948

== Battle of June 11 ==
The first Israeli attempt to disconnect the eastern wing of the Egyptian army was during the first stage of the war, right before the first ceasefire came into effect. Forces from the Negev Brigade's 8th Battalion assembled at Revivim, which also served as the headquarters of the 8th Battalion. A jeep-mounted task force split south, in order to block the road for Egyptian reinforcements.That same night, an Egyptian supply convoy entered Bir 'Asluj with ammunition and cannons.

Two other small forces split from the main Israeli group—one to the east to mine the road, and a mortar contingent that went northwards to Beersheba to divert the attention of the Egyptians from the main attack. The Israeli attack started at 05:30, lasting until 07:00 and ending in a victory. Five Israelis and an estimated 25 Egyptians were killed. Fourteen Egyptians were captured. However, a team of Negev Brigade troops then entered the police station, which was booby trapped, and 10 were instantly killed.

Immediately after the battle, when the first truce came into effect, the Egyptians set up positions on the other side of the road and created a new path that would not be in range of the Israelis. During the truce, Egypt strengthened its hold on the al-Majdal – Bayt Jibrin road to the north, giving its forces a safe corridor between the western wing (on the Mediterranean coast) and eastern wing, and at the same time blocking Israeli transport to the Negev, making it an enclave. The next Israeli–Egyptian battles were therefore concentrated in that area. A skirmish took place in Bir 'Asluj on July 18, 1948; Egyptian forces attacked the Israeli positions but were repulsed.

== December battle ==
=== Prelude ===
The third and final stage of the 1948 Arab–Israeli War started on October 15, 1948, when Israel launched Operation Yoav on the southern front. While the Israelis made significant tactical and strategic gains in Operation Yoav (for example, reconnecting the Negev, that was an enclave for several months), the political situation changed little and Egypt was still dragging its feet on proposed armistice talks. Operation Horev was therefore launched in the south with the final aim of expelling all Egyptian forces from Israel. The main thrust of the operation was planned to be towards the eastern arm, with the final aim of cutting the western wing of the Egyptian army off from the bulk of its forces in Israel.

The Israeli Southern Command outlined a total of 18 positions from west to east that needed to be captured. Six of them (No. 13–18) were in the Thamila theater. Four of them (No. 13–16) were referred to as the Thamila Positions, on the junction of the main road with a north–south dirt road, placed in an arrow formation. The 17th position was Bir Thamila itself, while the 18th was the approach to Bir 'Asluj.

On December 25, a company-sized commando force from the Negev Brigade took the position of al-Mushrife, situated on the road between of Bir 'Asluj and 'Auja, thus cutting the Egyptian forces into two. The unit prepared for a lengthy battle, but found the place deserted. This also gave the Israelis the opportunity to listen in on Egyptian telephone communications between 'Auja and Bir 'Asluj. The bulk of the brigade's strike force, however, was unable to organize in time due to harsh weather conditions and could start the main attack only on December 25, one day later than planned. David Ben-Gurion, the prime minister and defense minister, personally came to see off the troops.

=== Battle ===
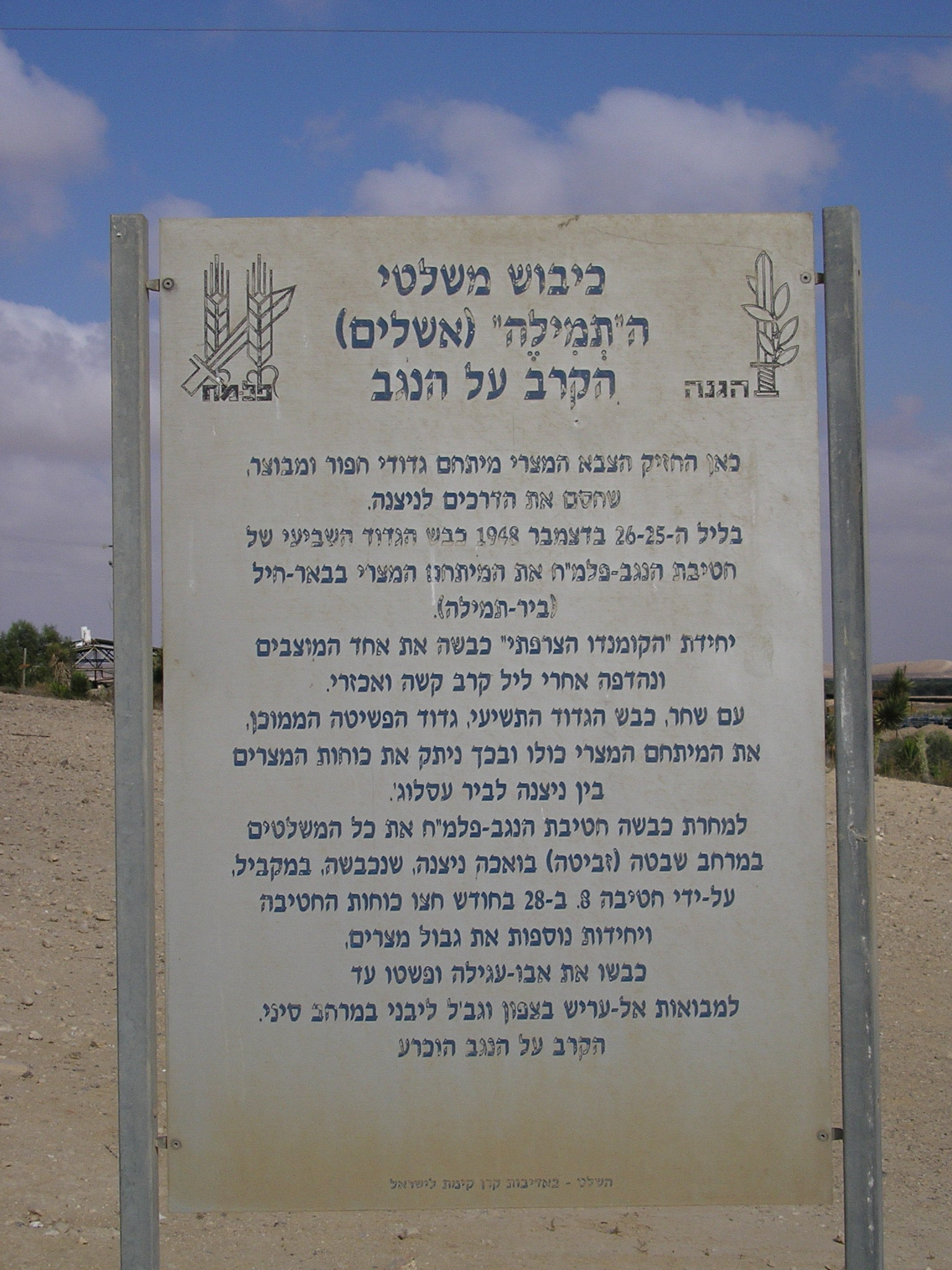
Plaque telling the story of the battle for Bir Thamila

The task force allocated for the battle of Bir Thamila – Bir 'Asluj set off from Halutza at 17:00 on December 25. They took up positions in the Umm Suweila range, between Wadi Thamila (HaBesor Stream) and Wadi 'Asluj (Revivim Stream). At 20:30, the 7th Infantry Battalion attacked in two forces: the main one against Bir Thamila (Position 17), and the other, an overseas volunteer unit called the French Commando, against Position 13 on the junction. The main force managed to sneak in to Bir Thamila unnoticed, reaching the position's southern fence before opening fire. The two southern outposts were taken in a quick battle, after which the defenses crumpled. By 23:30, the 7th Battalion was in control of the location, finding a lot of abandoned munitions.

By 22:30, the French Commando had captured Position 13 and the rest of the battalion had taken Position 17. Three Egyptian positions adjacent to #13 were still manned, and the troops there began a counterattack and slowly ate away at the French Commando forces. At 01:30 on December 26, the operational reserve, which had arrived at Bir Thamila, came to reinforce Position 13. However, by dawn about half of the Israeli forces there had been dead or wounded, and they retreated. The 9th Mechanized Battalion forces, which had also arrived by that time and were meant to provide further reinforcements, got bogged down in the dirt and could provide no immediate assistance. The retreating French Commando had left several wounded under the old railway bridge near the position, in hopes of collecting them later.

When the 9th Battalion troops managed to free themselves and continue moving, the victorious Egyptian troops were following the French Commando. The 9th Battalion was able to inflict significant damage to these forces and continue to Position 13. Even though some of the vehicles were bogged down in the dirt and quicksand, and two were blown up by land mines, they nevertheless outflanked and recaptured the position at 04:30. The 9th Battalion quickly began moving east to positions 14–15 in order to create chaos and pin down the remaining Egyptian forces. Meanwhile, another contingent of the battalion set out from Bir Thamila and captured the 14th position. A jeep platoon encircled the Egyptians from the east and helped complete the capture of the 15th and 16th positions.

The Thamila Positions were entirely in Israeli hands by 09:00 on December 16. The Egyptian forces fled to 'Auja and the southern Bir 'Asluj positions, which were now cut off and later found abandoned. The French Commando, which returned to look for their wounded, found them dead with their bodies mutilated. In a fit of revenge, they killed several Egyptians captured during the battle. As a result, the unit was disbanded.

== Aftermath ==
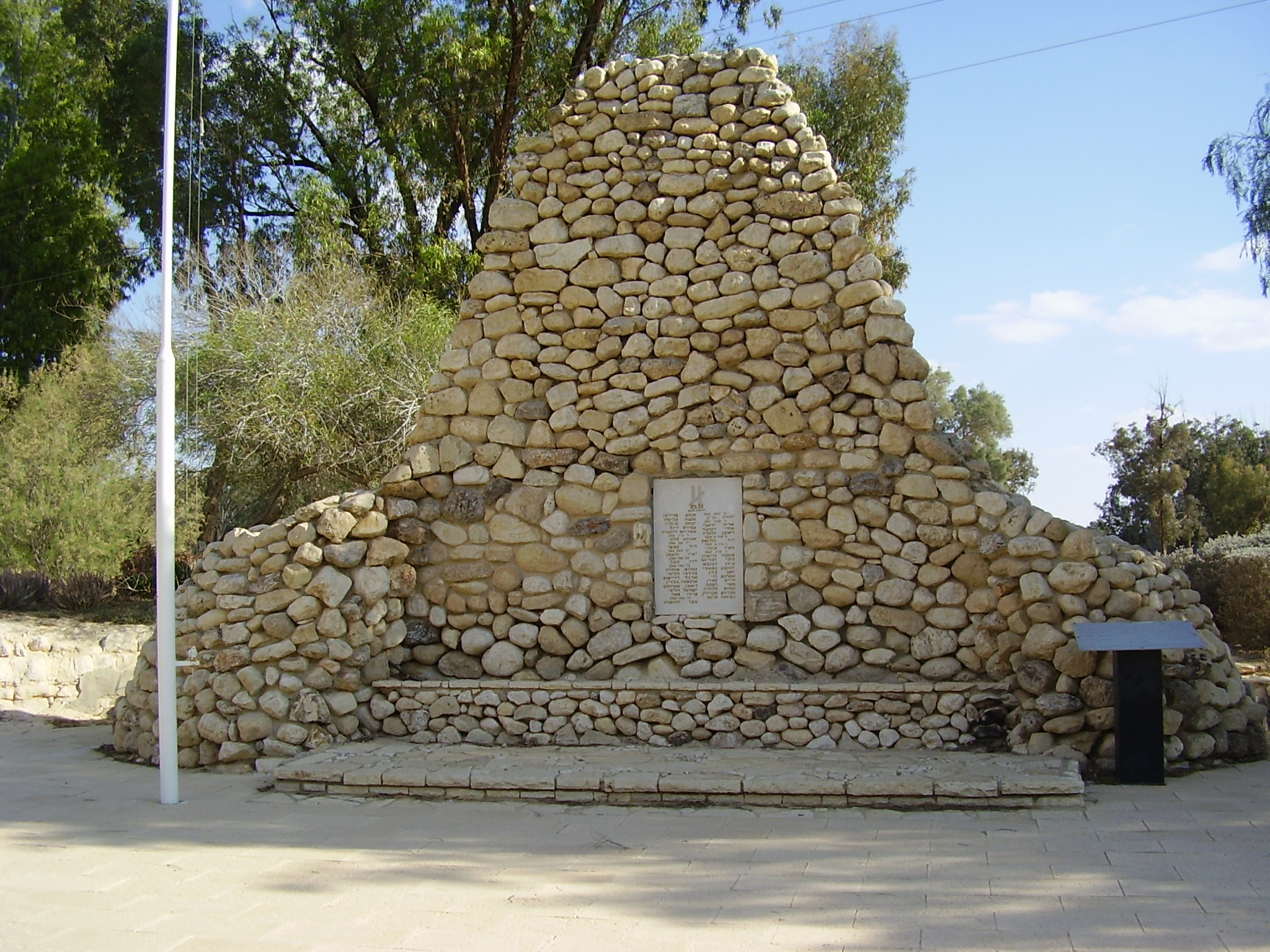
Monument for the fallen in the battles of Bir 'Asluj

'Auja was taken by the 8th Brigade on December 25–27, and by the afternoon of December 27, all of the Egyptian positions between Beersheba and 'Auja were in Israeli hands. In light of the success, already on December 28, much of the Negev Brigade and 82nd Battalion of the 8th Brigade advanced into the Sinai Peninsula, capturing Abu Ageila and almost reaching al-Arish, aiming to cut off the western wing of the Egyptian forces. The Israeli forces retreated due to international pressure.

After the end of the war, Bir 'Asluj started to be called by its Hebrew name, Be'er Mash'abim. A monument was erected there on June 1, 1949, to remember the 8th Battalion soldiers who were killed in action there throughout the war. It was built by Aryeh Lafka, a resident of Revivim and the father of one of the soldiers who went into the booby-trapped police station on June 11, 1948. The ruins of the station served as construction materials for the monument. The names of the other Negev soldiers who died in the battles of Bir 'Asluj were added on July 20, 1971.
