= Golani Brigade =

Infantry brigade of the Israel Defense Forces

1st "Golani" Brigade
- Golani Tree, the Brigade's symbol "My Golani"
- Active: 1948–present
- Country: Israel
- Branch: Israeli Ground Forces
- Type: Infantry
- Size: 5 battalions
- Part of: 36th Division, Northern Command
- Garrison/HQ: Camp Shraga
- Motto: "The No. 1 Brigade"
- Colors: Brown beret, yellow and green flag
- March: "Golani Sheli" ("My Golani")
- Mascot: Olive Tree
- Engagements: Arab–Israeli conflict; War of Independence; Reprisal operations; Suez Crisis; Six-Day War; Yom Kippur War; Operation Entebbe; 1982 Lebanon War; South Lebanon conflict (1985–2000); Second Intifada; 2006 Lebanon War; Gaza War (2008–09); 2014 Gaza war; Gaza war; 2024 Lebanon war; Israeli invasion of Syria (2024–present); 2026 Iran war; 2026 Lebanon war

Commanders
- Current commander: Colonel Yair Palai

The 1st "Golani" Brigade (Hebrew: חֲטִיבַת גּוֹלָנִי, Hativat Golani) is an Israeli military infantry brigade. It is subordinated to the 36th Division and traditionally associated with the Northern Command. It is one of the five infantry brigades of IDF, the others being the Paratroopers Brigade, the Nahal Brigade, the Givati Brigade and the Kfir Brigade. Its symbol is a green olive tree against a yellow background, with its soldiers wearing a brown beret. It is one of the most highly decorated infantry units in the IDF. The brigade consists of five battalions, including two which it kept from its inception (12th and 13th), and one transferred from the Givati Brigade (51st).

The brigade was formed on February 22, 1948, during the 1948 Arab–Israeli War, when the Levanoni Brigade in the Galilee split into the 1st Golani Brigade and the 2nd Carmeli Brigade. It has since participated in all of Israel's major wars and nearly all major operations, including the Suez Crisis, the Six-Day War, the War of Attrition, the Yom Kippur War, Operation Entebbe, the 1978 South Lebanon conflict, the 1982 and 2006 Lebanon Wars, and various operations during the Palestinian intifadas.

Three of its commanders (Mordechai Gur, Gabi Ashkenazi and Gadi Eizenkot) have become IDF Chiefs of Staff, with many more reaching the rank of aluf (major general).

== History ==
=== Founding and initial organization ===
As the end of the British Mandate of Palestine was fast approaching, the leadership of the Haganah drafted Plan Dalet for its subsequent organization and operations. The plan divided the fighting militia (Field Corps) into six regional brigades – Levanoni in the north, Alexandroni in the Sharon region, Kiryati in the Tel Aviv area, Givati in the Shfela, and Etzioni in the Jerusalem area. On February 28, 1948, the Levanoni Brigade was split into two—Carmeli in the northwest, and Golani in the northeast.

Golani's area of operations included much of the Lower Galilee and Jezreel Valley, the Jordan Valley and the Hula Valley. It extended to al-Jalama and Bat Shlomo in the west. Major population centers included Safed, Tiberias, Beit She'an and Nazareth. The new brigade had five battalions, with its headquarters in Yavne'el:

Number	Name	Meaning	Theater	Comments
11	Alon	Oak	Upper Galilee ("Tel Hai")	Transferred to Oded in May 1948
12	Barak	Lightning	Lower Galilee and Jordan Valley ("Benjamin")	
13	Gideon	Gideon	East Jezreel Valley ("Simeon")	
14	Dror	Named after commander, Ya'akov Dror	Jezreel Valley ("Levi")	
15	Goren	Named after commander, Moshe Goren	Jordan Valley	Created to assist Barak Battalion in the Jordan Valley battles
Sources: Baltheim (1982), pp. 30–31; Etzioni (1951), p. 5

Moshe Mann was the first commander of the Golani Brigade. In mid-1948, Nahum Golan replaced Mann. In the introduction to the book Ilan VeShalach, Nahum Golan wrote regarding the Golani Brigade:

"…We grew up in the Galilean landscape and in the plains of the valleys, and in the expanses of the Negev we broadened our horizons-we matured. It was the settlement in the valleys and in the Galilee that gave the brigade its distinctive character and special mark, and from it the brigade drew its values; for this reason, the brigade was rural in character and loyal to the values it had imbibed in these settlement blocs. It was marked by the qualities of the tiller of the soil and the village dweller: stubbornness, adherence to the mission, rootedness, and calm… Around the settlers, young men from the city and the moshava rallied together (among them not a few traditionally observant Jews), as well as Gahal and Mahal volunteers- all blended and merged within it… Not a few young women served in the brigade's units in various roles, and many of them operated just like the men in every respect-as radio operators or as combat medics…"

— Nachum Golan, Ilan VeShalach

=== War of Independence ===
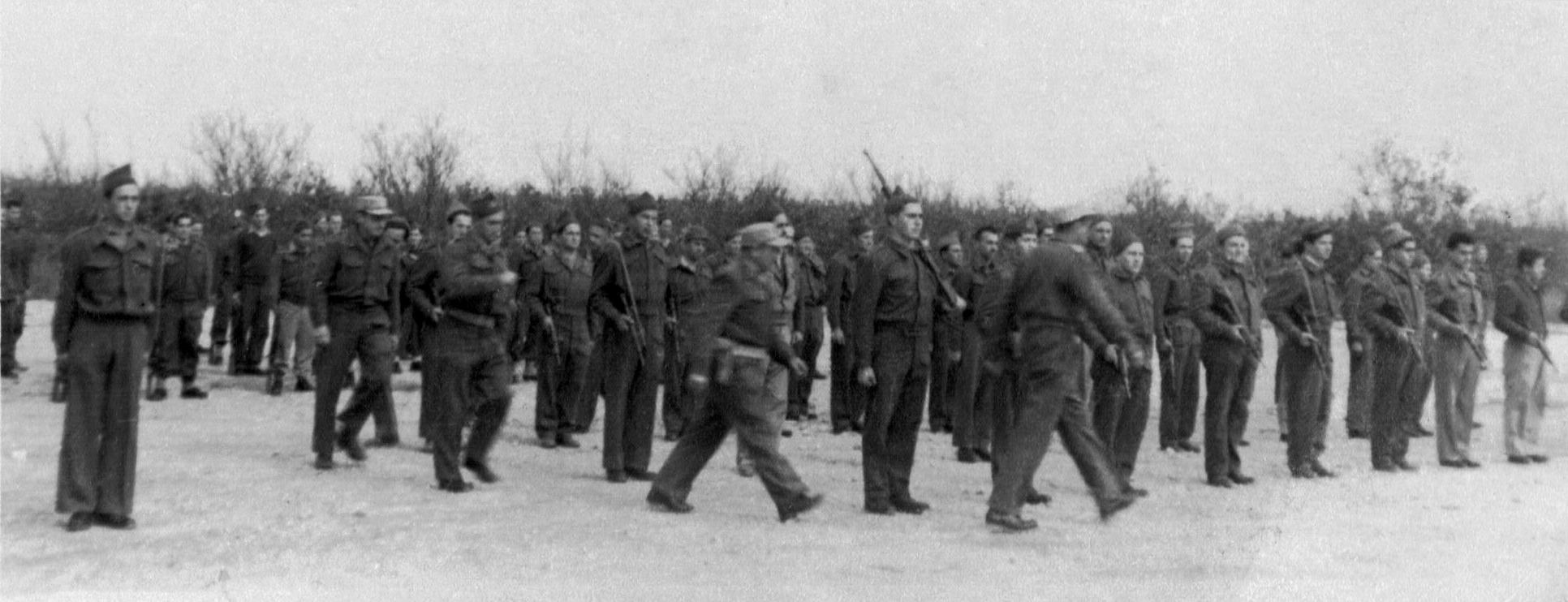
A Golani brigade roll call prior to Operation Uvda, 1949

During the 1947–48 Civil War in Mandatory Palestine, Golani mostly participated in the battles for the mixed cities in the north, such as the Battle of Tiberias and battles in Safed in April–May 1948. The 12th Battalion captured al-Shajara on May 6, 1948, and the 13th Battalion captured Beit She'an on May 12. After these operations, responsibility over the northeastern part of the brigade's sector (the Tel Hai area, 11th Battalion), was handed over to the Oded Brigade and other forces. In December 1948, the 14th and 15th battalions were merged into the Mechanized Attack Battalion.

The first Golani action following the Arab intervention in the 1948 war was the defense of the kibbutzim Degania Alef and Bet from the Syrian Army in the Battles of the Kinarot Valley. Units from the Barak Battalion, with Yiftach (Palmach) and Guard Corps reinforcements, successfully fended off a Syrian attack. The brigade was also successful at repelling Iraqi forces at the Battle of Gesher to the south. After the Jordan Valley battles died out, Golani went on the offensive, attacking a number of Arab villages in its sector, and finally mounting an offensive on Jenin together with the Carmeli Brigade on June 2, 1948. The attack eventually succeeded, but Jenin was retaken by the Iraqi Army shortly after.

During the Battles of the Ten Days between the first and second truces of the war (July 8–18, 1948), Golani managed to repel the Arab Liberation Army attack on Sejera from Lubya, and helped capture Nazareth and eventually Lubya in Operation Dekel. Golani participated in Operation Hiram in October 1948, where at first it staged diversionary attacks from the south. Afterwards captured Eilabun, Mughar, Rameh and other villages in the ALA First Yarmouk Battalion's zone.

In December 1948, the brigade was largely transferred to the south in preparation for Operation Horev. Golani fought the Egyptians in the Gaza Strip, in Operation Assaf, the Battle of Hill 86 and later battles around Rafah. In March 1949, the brigade was tasked with capturing Umm Rashrash, today Eilat, with the 7th Armored Brigade. Golani advanced through the Arabah region in the east and arrived at the location two hours after the 7th. This was the last operation of the war.

=== Border Raids and Suez Crisis ===
After the 1948 Arab–Israeli War, the Golani Brigade participated in a number of reprisal raids in the first part of the 1950s. In 1951, a Syrian patrol entered the demilitarized zone near Tel Mutilla, and was attacked by reservist IDF troops. Golani reinforced a reserve battalion and entered a battle that lasted five days, costing the brigade 40 dead and 72 wounded. The battle caused a number of changes in the IDF doctrine and was a catalyst for the creation of Unit 101. On October 28, 1955, after a border incident with Egypt around the Auja al-Hafir demilitarized zone, Golani was tasked with leading Operation Volcano, an attack on the Egyptian army in the area and the largest military operation at the time since the 1948 war.

In the Suez Crisis of 1956, the brigade's task was to capture the area around the city Rafah. The 51st Battalion, formerly of Givati, led the assault on the Rafah Junction. They were ordered to abandon their vehicles after reaching a minefield and coming under fire from Egyptian artillery, although the battalion's sappers slowly created a way forward for a line of vehicles and the battalion captured the intended Egyptian positions. The 12th Battalion captured positions on the Rafah – Khan Yunis road, and the 13th—positions south of Rafah.

In early 1960, after a border incident on the backdrop of the Israeli–Syrian water dispute, Golani destroyed the abandoned village al-Tawafiq, which overlooked Tel Katzir and was used by the Syrians as a military base. In March 1962, Golani launched Operation Swallow against the Syrians at Nuqeib on the east bank of the Sea of Galilee, in response to constant Syrian harassment of Israeli fishermen in the lake. In May 1965, as part of a larger operation, Golani conducted a raid on Shunat Nimrin in Jordan.

=== Six-Day War ===
On June 7, 1967, Golani units joined Israeli armored units in its assault on Nablus, capturing the city by 15:00. The remainder of the brigade was kept in the north for the planned thrust against the Syrian army on the Golan Heights. Planning called for the 12th Battalion to capture Tel Faher and Burj Babil, Banias, Tel Hamra and Ayn Fit. The 51st took Bahriat, Tel Azaziat and Khirbet as-Suda. The 13th Battalion was left as an operational reserve in the northeastern tip of Israel.

On June 9, the 51st Battalion crossed the border and advanced north along the Syrian patrol road. Its 3rd Company turned west to find Bahriat abandoned, while 2nd Company turned west and flanked Tel Azaziyat. The soldiers drove into a minefield and were forced to abandon their half-tracks, advancing to the trenches of Tel Azaziyat on foot. The battle continued from 16:21 to 17:06, ending in a Syrian surrender. At 16:46, 3rd Company captured Khirbet as-Suda, along with a T-54 tank. Meanwhile, the 12th Battalion split up to assault Burj Babil and Tel Faher. The forces at Tel Faher met stiff resistance and the 2nd Company now in Burj Babil was called to assist them. By 16:20, the southern position at Tel Faher had been taken. At 17:30, the Golani reconnaissance company came from the southeast to reinforce the 12th. By 18:20, Tel Faher was in Israeli hands.

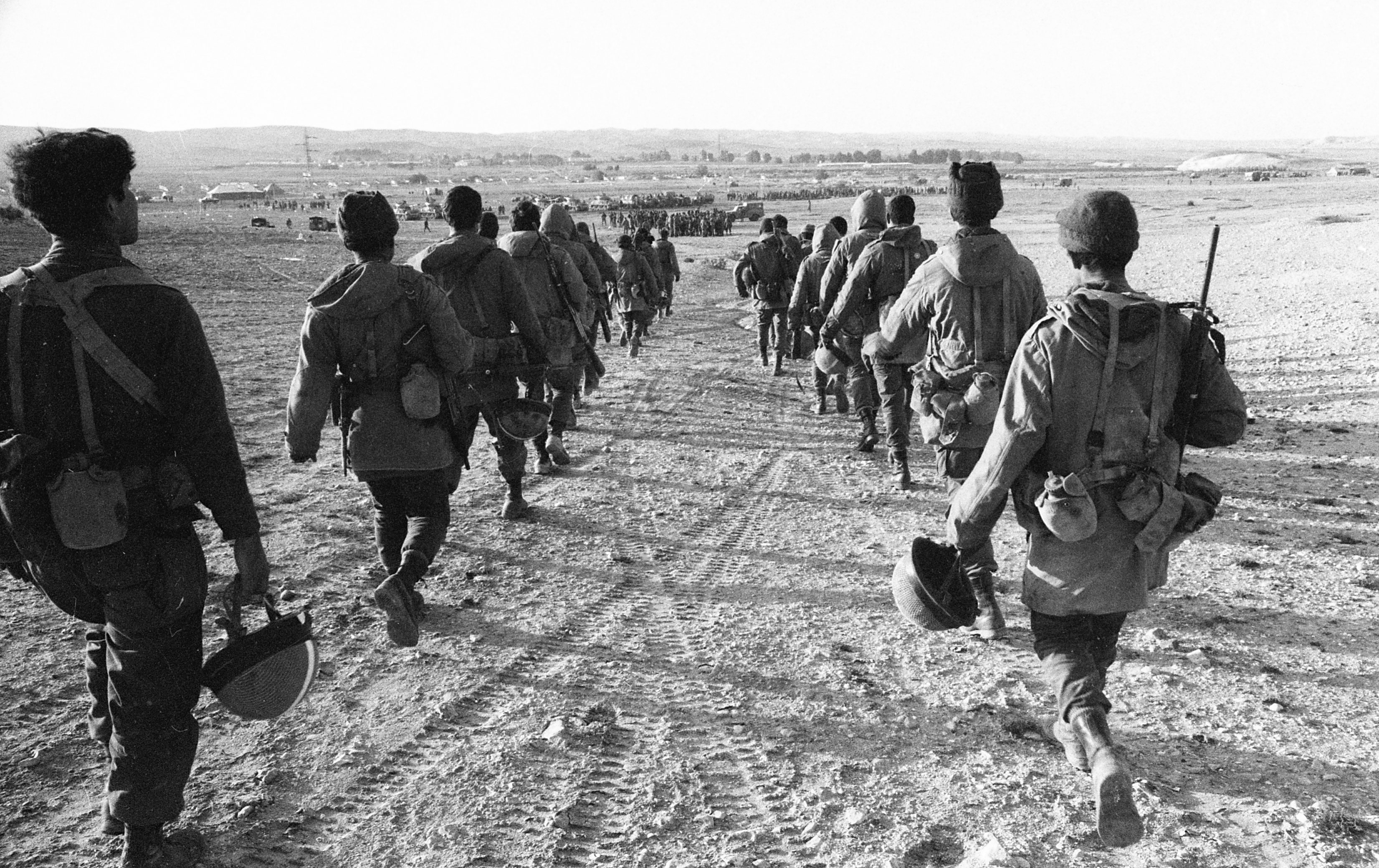
Golani Brigade in Sinai, 1972

The 13th Battalion was called to help the 8th Brigade which was operating in the same area. They helped capture a position north of Za'ura, and the village Jbab al-Mis to the south. Just before dawn, the 51st assaulted Banias and captured it. Reinforcements from the 45th Brigade captured Tel Hamra slightly to the north. During the course of the war, the Golani Brigade suffered 59 dead and 160 wounded, of them 23 in the Battle of Tel Faher.

=== Counter-insurgency activities ===
After the Six-Day War, the activity in northern Israel where Golani was based was mostly limited to raids against fedayeen (guerrilla) bases in Jordan, Lebanon and the West Bank, now under Israeli control. The objectives of these raids were to undermine the fedayeen bases in order to prevent attacks against Israelis. The three main raids against Jordan during this period were: the attack on the village Wadi al-Yabis across the river from Tirat Tzvi; the attack on the Cones Position across from Ashdot Ya'akov; and the attack on the Jordanian Ghor canal and defensive line.

The raid on Wadi al-Yabis, code-named Operation Asuta 12, was carried out by the Golani reconnaissance unit and the 12th Battalion on May 4, 1969. The forces did not meet any resistance and returned after completing the mission of destroying a number of structures. The Cone Position, named after a cone-shaped building on the premises, was attacked by the reconnaissance unit in July 1969. The guerrillas fled, but alerted the Jordanians who opened artillery fire on the Israelis. After blowing up two bunkers, the Israelis returned.

The destruction of the Ghor canal was a punitive measure against the Jordanian farmers of the area, from where numerous guerrilla attacks against Israeli farmers were initiated. The three positions defending it did not notice the Israeli forces. While the attack did not go as planned when the bombs laid near the canal were detonated prematurely, it was destroyed and the water drained into the Yarmouk River.

On the Lebanese front, Golani participated in numerous raids into southern and eastern Lebanon. In October 1969, the brigade's forces attacked Itarun (Operation Double Bass 1), Tel Sadr al-Arus and 'Arab Zahiran. Twenty-four buildings were destroyed across the three villages. Another operation, Double Bass 10, involved a retaliatory raid on Kfar Kila on January 2, 1970, in response to the kidnapping of an elderly guard from Metula by Fatah two days earlier. Another retaliatory strike came on December 27, 1970, against the village Yatar, a major guerrilla base.

A major attack was carried out in response to the 1972 Munich Massacre. On September 16, 1972, Operation Extended Turmoil 4 was launched against bases in southern Lebanon, containing an estimated 600 guerrillas. Golani forces reached the Litani river in the east, while Paratroopers reached Juwaya just south of the river. Most of the guerrilla forces did not engage the Israelis and chose to retreat, with over 40 of them killed.

In the Gaza Strip, Golani operated according to the new counter-resistance IDF doctrine calling for the adoption of guerrilla tactics, and operating in small teams and in open areas. During this period, Golani units were also stationed along the Bar Lev line and participated in the War of Attrition, especially in the Qantara East area.

On July 4th, 1976, a detachment of Golani took part in Operation Entebbe, to rescue hostages held in Uganda held by at least six Palestinians and two German hijackers supported by regular Ugandan soldiers. The mission was a resounding success, although there were three hostages killed as well as Lieutenant Colonel Yonatan Netanyahu, the commander of Sayeret Matkal who spearheaded the attack.

=== Yom Kippur War ===
Like the rest of the IDF, the Golani Brigade was caught by surprise with the first Arab attack of the Yom Kippur War. The brigade's sector in the Golan Heights was lightly manned, and most of its units were either on leave or preparing for a planned major ceremony. The Syrians attacked in three major locations: near Khushniya, Quneitra and Mas'ada. The 13th Battalion's position on Mount Hermon was overrun on October 6–7, 1973. The brigade was assigned defence of the northern Golan, in preparation for a push to retake the Hermon.

After helping fend off two major Syrian offensives, armored forces joined the battle in the area and gave Golani time to reorganize. A northern and southern force were created, with the southern force taking and defending major positions in the heart of the Golan, including Nafakh, a military base and junction on the Petroleum Road. The Petroleum Road crosses diagonally the northern Golan Heights and the Nafakh base is at the junction with a road which leads down to the strategic Bnot Yaakov Bridge over the Jordan River and into northern Israel. By October 10, those parts of the Golan under the brigade's responsibility were back under Israeli control, and the Syrians were pushed back over the Purple Line. However, the 12th Battalion commander was killed in the battle for Mount Varda.

The Israelis went to the offensive in the northern Golan on October 11. The 12th Battalion captured Jubata al-Khashab and Tel al-Ahmad, and later took positions and fended off Syrian attacks in Mazra'at Beit Jan. The 51st took Tel ad-Dahur, and after a failed attack on Beit Jann, took the village Hadar.

After the events of October 6, Israel was determined to recapture Mount Hermon, nicknamed the "eyes of the country". The Second Battle of Mount Hermon began on October 8, when the 17th Battalion took tanks and half-tracks up the slopes of the Hermon, but its attack failed and the battalion suffered 25 dead and 57 wounded. During the next 13 days, the Israelis exchanged artillery fire with the Syrians on the Hermon. The next attack came on October 21. Operation Dessert saw a joint force of Paratroopers and Golani retake the mountain. Golani staged a three-pronged attack by the 51st Battalion, the reconnaissance unit, the 17th Battalion and a motorized battalion. The reconnaissance unit captured the cable car position at dawn with support from elements of the 17th Battalion that were seconded to the Recce Unit. The battle ended at 11:00, when the 51st Battalion reported that it had captured the Israeli Golan position.

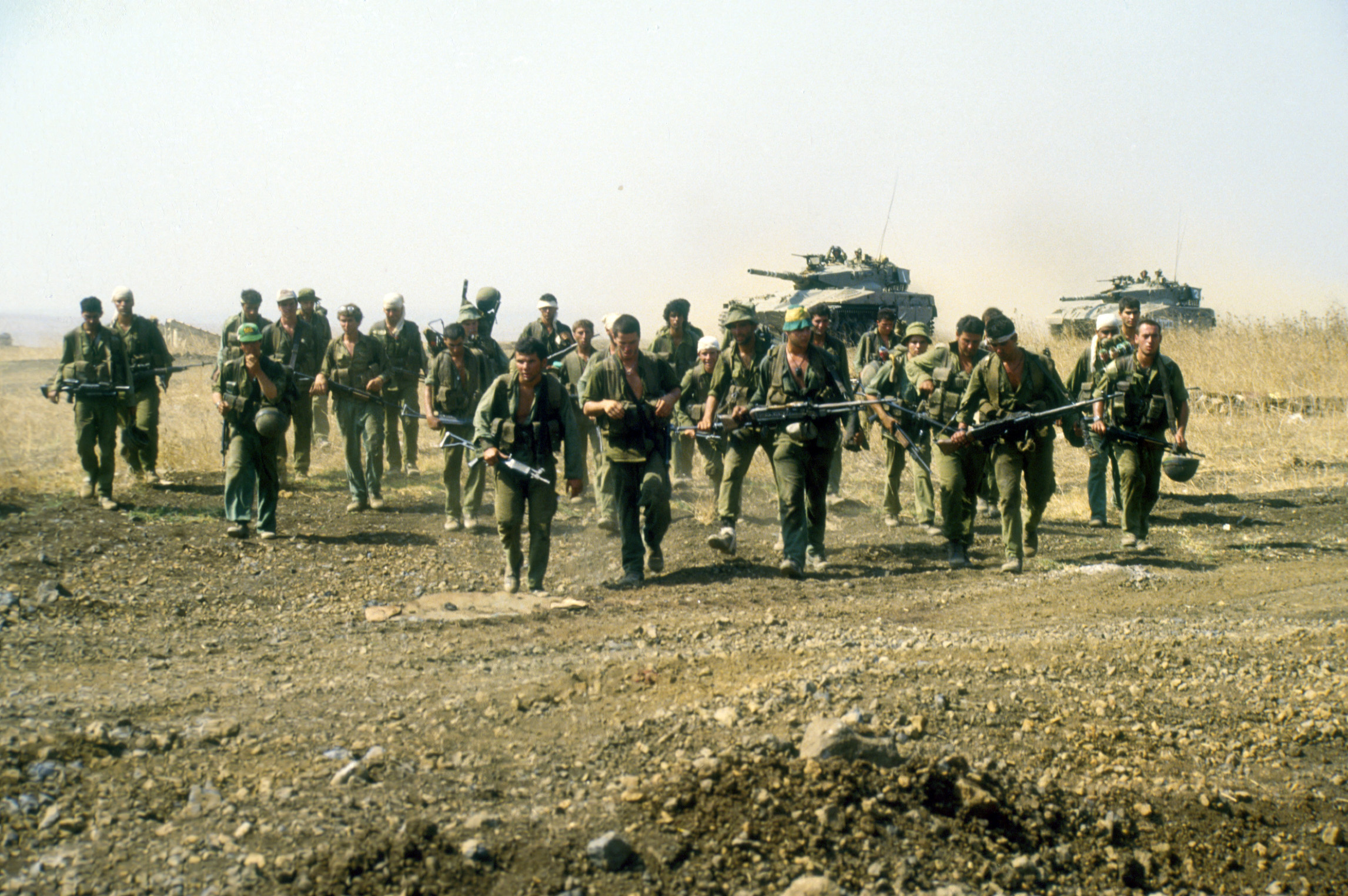
Golani Brigade performing a large scale exercise in 1986

After the Yom Kippur War, Golani forces were involved in a war of attrition with Syria until the disengagement agreement of May 31, 1974. After the agreement was signed, the brigade, which had lost many of its top officers in the war, was transferred into the Sinai to rebuild and train. They were brought back to the Golan Heights in early 1975.

=== Operations in Southern Lebanon and First Lebanon War ===
During the 1970s, Golani conducted frequent raids in Southern Lebanon in its battle against resistance attacks and guerrilla raids by the Palestinian Fatah organization. In March 1978, with the launch of Operation Litani, much of the brigade moved to capture the village al-Hiyam. The 12th Battalion captured Marjayoun and Rashaya al-Fukhar. After clearing these villages, Golani units returned to Israel and advanced west along the Litani River, capturing a number of villages and stopping at Abbasiya just east of Tyre.

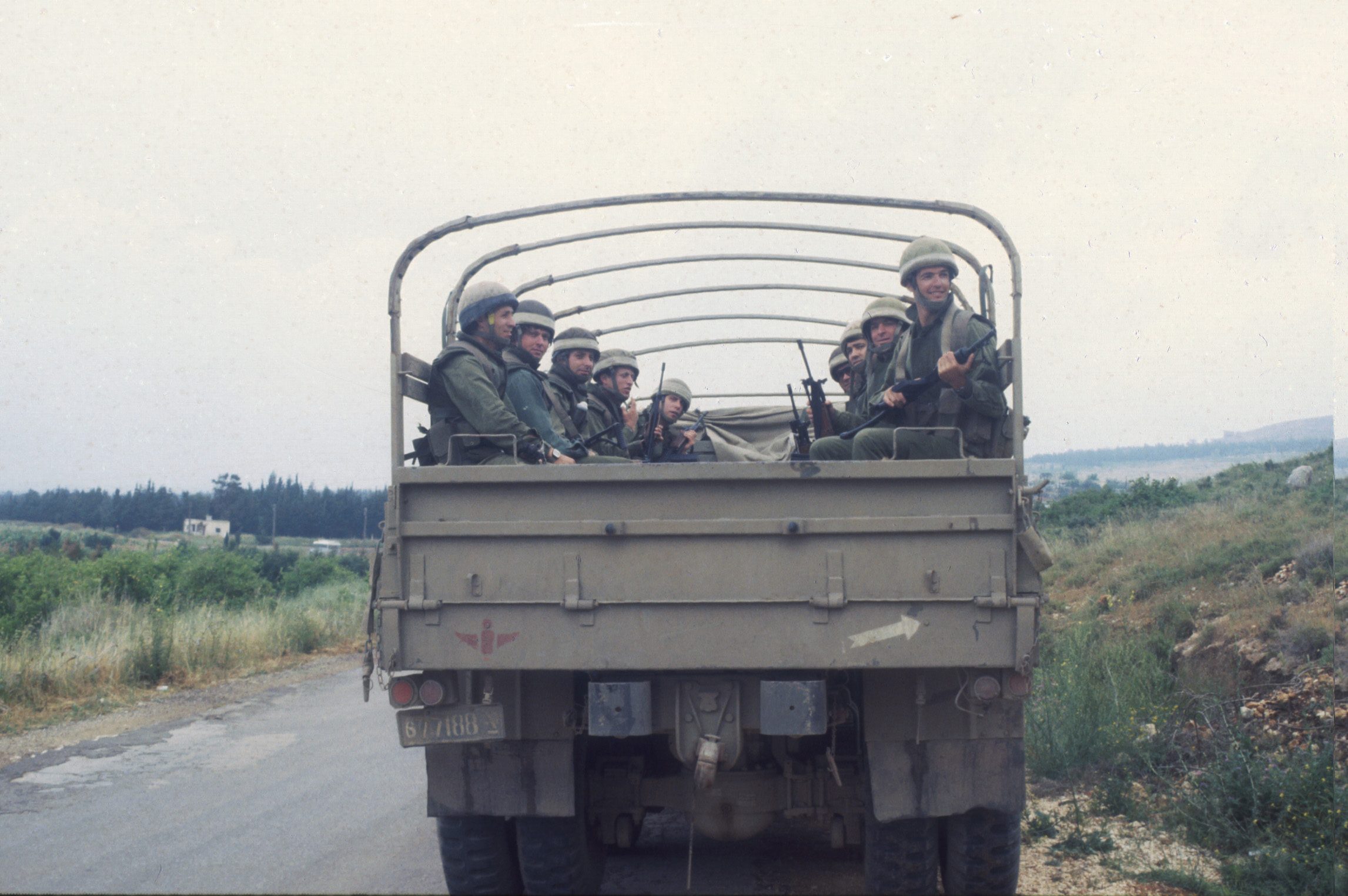
Golani Brigade in Golan Heights, 1986

In Operation Peace for Galilee, which later became known as the First Lebanon War, Golani's 51st Battalion fought in the vicinity of Nabatieh. On June 6, 1982, the reconnaissance unit assaulted the PLO-held Beaufort Castle. The 12th Battalion was subordinated to the Barak Armored Brigade, with a planned thrust along the Lebanese coastal strip to Tyre. This force captured the villages of Doha and Kafr Sil on June 9–10, 1982, on the outskirts of Beirut. The brigade took part in the Siege of Beirut, where its units were present until the end of the war in September 1982.

=== Second Intifada ===
Two years after the start of the Second Intifada in 2000, Israel launched Operation Defensive Shield in response to growing Palestinian resistance attacks against occupation Israeli soldiers. Golani participated in a number of battles against Palestinian militants, including the siege of the Ramallah Mukataa, capture of Tulkarm, and the Battle of Jenin.

=== Second Lebanon War ===
In the Second Lebanon War in July 2006, Golani participated in the Battle of Maroun al-Ras and the 12th and 51st battalions fought in the Battle of Bint Jbeil. During the battle, a hand grenade was thrown over the wall, Major Roi Klein jumped on the live grenade and muffled the explosion with his body. Eight soldiers and commanders from the 51st battalion were killed.

=== 2007–2022 ===
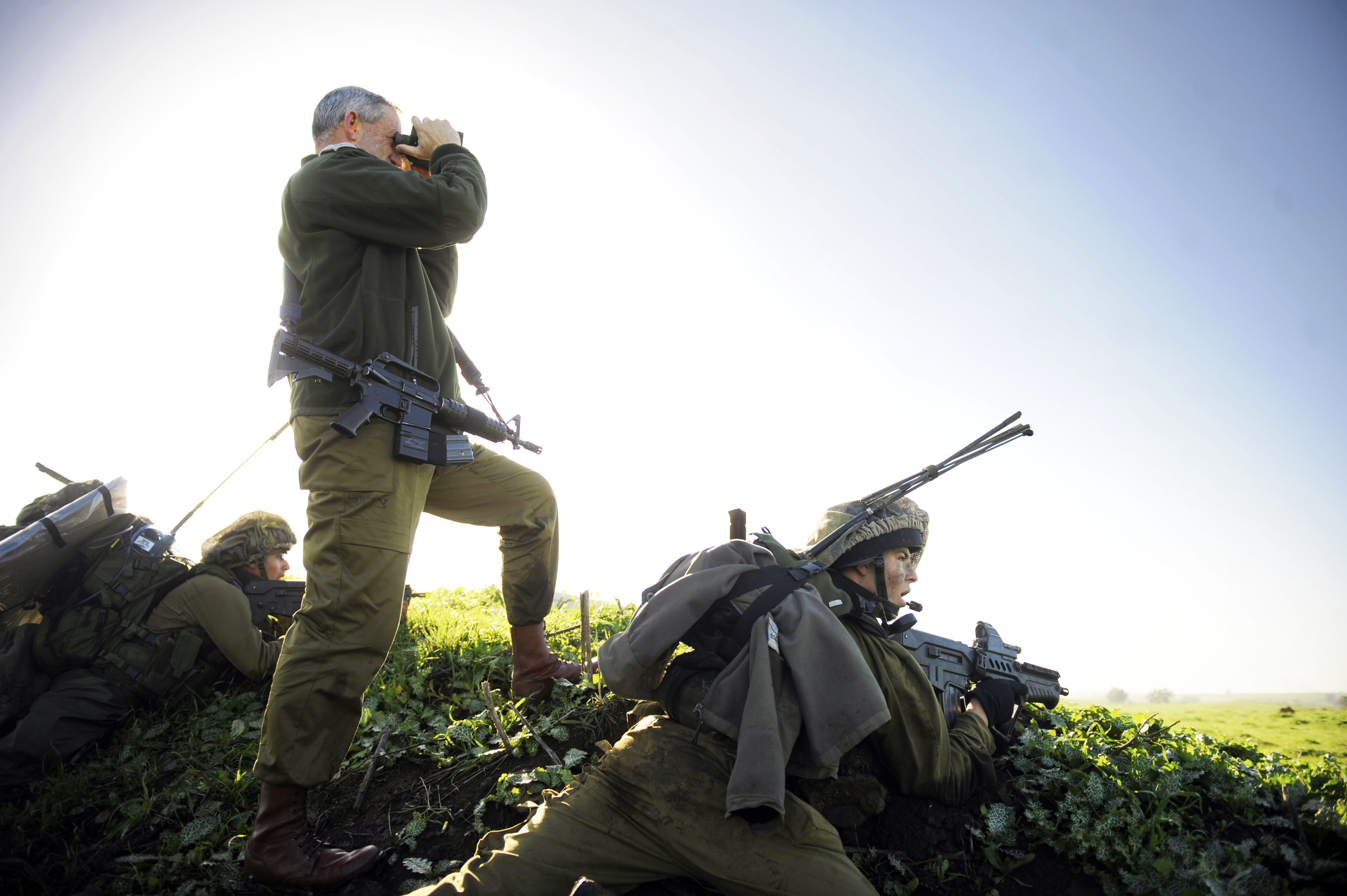
Lt. Gen. Benny Gantz at a military drill conducted by the Barak Battalion in northern Israel, 2011

The Golani Brigade participated in Operation Cast Lead. On January 5, 2009, Golani soldiers Maj. Dagan Wartman (32), Staff Sgt. Nitai Stern (21), and Cpl. Yousef Muadi (19) were killed in northern Gaza in a friendly fire incident when a tank accidentally fired a live round at an abandoned building in Jabalya in which Golani forces were taking cover. Three other soldiers were severely wounded and twenty more had minor injuries.

Following the deployment of Golani soldiers in Hebron in December 2011, there were reports that city residents sensed a 'manifest worsening of soldiers behavior', as a result of 'detention, intimidation, provocation and arrest of children and teenagers; arbitrary detention of Palestinians or blocking access to roads; beating or threatened beating of detained residents; religion-based provocation and insults; forcible entry into homes and violation of Palestinian property' and 'reprisals against local and international human rights activists.'

At 1:05 a.m. on July 20, 2014, during Operation Protective Edge, seven Golani soldiers from the 13th Battalion were killed in the Battle of Shuja'iyya when an M113 armoured personnel carrier they were being transported in caught fire after an explosive device was set off under it. Reportedly, the APC was not fitted with armor that can withstand this type of blast. At 1:30 a.m., a soldier was killed when two soldiers got into a firefight with resistance fighters. At 5:45 a.m., another Golani force got into a firefight with resistance. Two soldiers were killed. At 8:50 a.m., three soldiers were killed when a Golani squad was caught inside a burning building, for a total of thirteen Golani soldiers killed in action that morning.

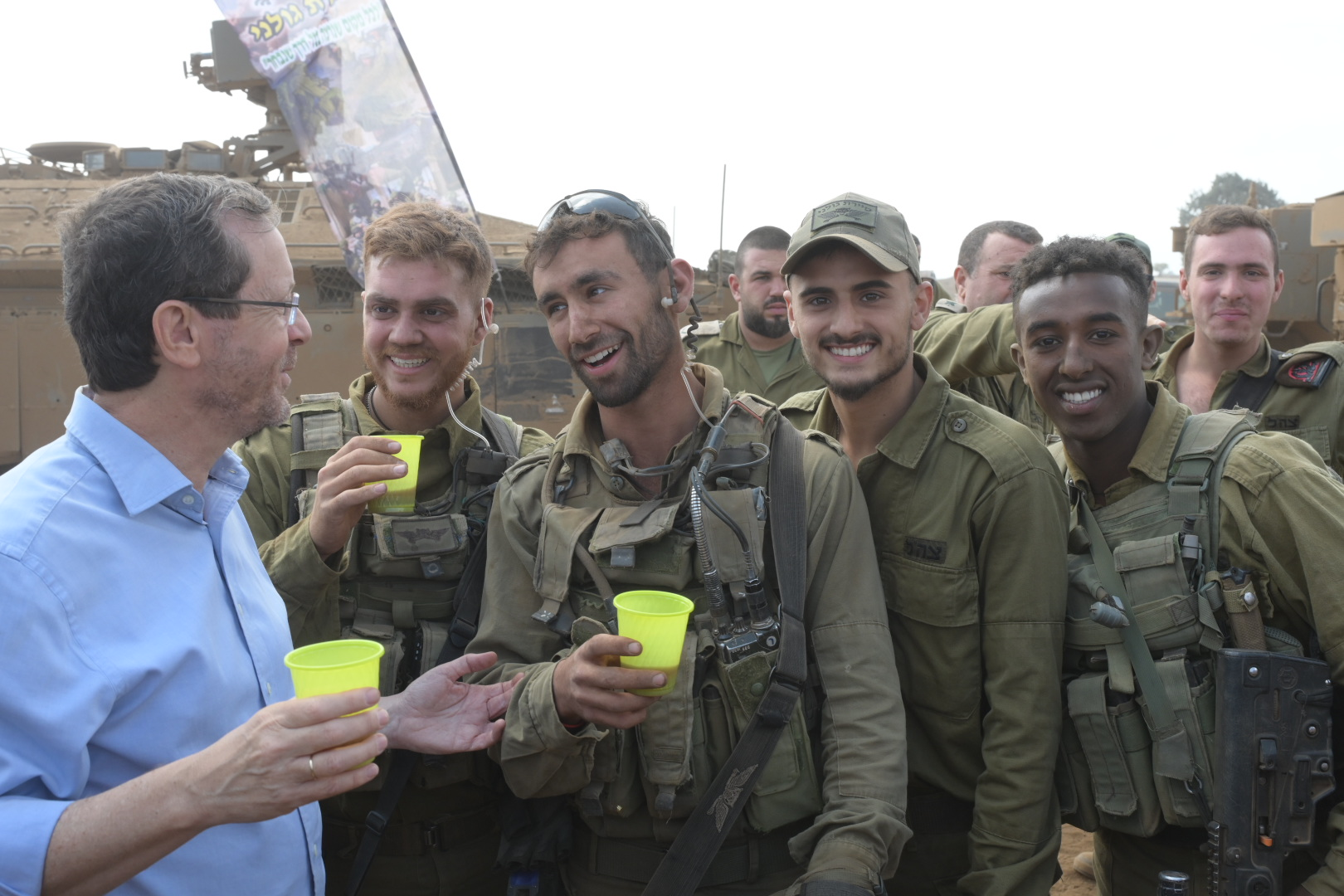
Israeli President Isaac Herzog with soldiers of the Golani Brigade in September 2022

The commander of the Golani Brigade, Colonel Ghassan Alian, the first non-Jewish commander of the brigade and the highest ranking Druze in the IDF, was lightly injured in his eye in an exchange of fire, and later returned to his soldiers after being treated.

=== Gaza war ===
The Golani Brigade's 13th and 51st Battalions suffered heavy casualties during the October 7 attacks in October 2023. According to the IDF, at least 72 of the brigade's soldiers were killed and an unknown number captured while defending the Gaza–Israel barrier. This was by far the highest number of fatalities for any single unit in the IDF during the offensive. Golani soldiers were underequipped and overstretched all along the border and were not able to repel the militants on the first line of military bases and kibbutzim that they assigned numerous platoons to defend. Each separate platoon had believed that their specific base or kibbutz was the main point of fighting and it took many hours for them to learn that Hamas had entered through everywhere at 29 points on the Gaza barrier and had reached the second and third lines of the IDF's defenses. This prevented the Golani soldiers from being able to retreat and organize all units and fight back effectively. They had received no intelligence from anybody that Hamas was going to enter through the Iron Wall and were caught completely by surprise. Golani soldiers were completely overwhelmed at all the first line military bases, especially at Nahal Oz and Re'im. The Hamas fighters outnumbered them and were able to defeat these Iron Wall bases with infantry tactics while using RPGs and Toyota pickup trucks and motorcycles for ground vehicles.

The 13th Battalion suffered 41 killed, which was more fatalities than it suffered in the Six-Day War and Yom Kippur War combined, and 91 wounded. Its headquarters were at the military base at Nahal Oz, and that was where many of the Golani soldiers were killed.

On December 12, 2023, seven Golani Brigade soldiers were killed in a booby-trapped building and subsequent ambush during the Siege of Gaza City. Most of the fatalities were high-ranking officers like Colonel Yitzhak Ben-Bashat, commander of the Golani Brigade's forward command team, and Lieutenant Colonel Tomer Grinberg, the commander of the 13th Battalion who had fought in the battles around Nahal Oz in Israel two months earlier. Ben-Basat was the highest-ranking IDF soldier killed during the Israeli invasion of Gaza.

On October 3, 2024, the Islamic Resistance in Iraq launched a kamikaze drone attack on a military base in the Israeli-occupied Golan Heights, killing two soldiers and injuring 24 others of the Golani Brigade's 13th Battalion.

==== War crimes ====
On March 23, 2025, soldiers from the Golani Brigade ambushed a humanitarian convoy and killed 15 Palestinian paramedics in Rafah. The vehicles were crushed and buried with the bodies of the victims. Some of the civilians were found, shot ‘execution-style’ from close range. After an IDF investigation of the massacre, the deputy commander of the brigade was dismissed for "providing an incomplete and inaccurate report". Human rights organizations characterized the massacre as a war crime.

An inquiry by the IDF determined that troops from the Golani Brigade had reported a camera which Israel claimed was the basis for the 2025 Nasser Hospital strikes.

== Insignia ==
The symbol of the brigade is a green olive tree with its roots on a yellow background. It was drawn by the 12th Battalion's intelligence officer, who came from kibbutz Beit Keshet, home to numerous olive trees. However, other sources claim it's an oak located in Yavne'el.

Early Golani soldiers were farmers and new immigrants, so the strong connection to the land (earth) was important to honor. For this reason, Golani's soldiers are designated by brown berets; the brown color symbolizing the brigade's connection with the soil of the Land of Israel.

The Golani Brigade's official song was written by Amos Ettinger, composed by Efi Netzer and popularly performed by Yehoram Gaon. The song mentions the brigade's many battles, including references to Rafah in the Sinai War, Tel Faher in the Six-Day War, and Mount Hermon in the Yom Kippur War.

During the Gaza war and the IDF invasion of the Gaza Strip, another flag of the Golani Brigade has also been witnessed.

== Namesakes ==
At the Golani Interchange in the upper Galilee east of Haifa stands the Golani Brigade Museum commemorating the brigade and its fallen troops. The site is also used for battalion ceremonies.

== Brigade organization ==
- 1st Infantry Brigade "Golani"
  - 11th Reconnaissance-Strike Battalion "Alon" (activated October 2026)
  - 12th Infantry Battalion "Barak"
  - 13th Infantry Battalion "Gideon"
  - 51st Infantry Battalion "HaBok'im HaRishon" (First Breachers)
  - (631st) Patrol Battalion "Golani"
  - 7086th Combat Engineer Battalion "Alon" (Reserve)
  - Logistics Battalion "Golani"
  - 351st Signals Company "Golani"

== Commanders of the Golani Brigade ==
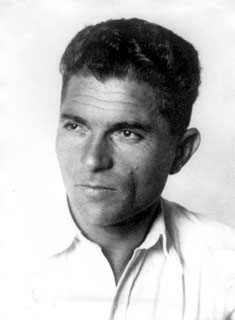
Moshe Mann, the first commander

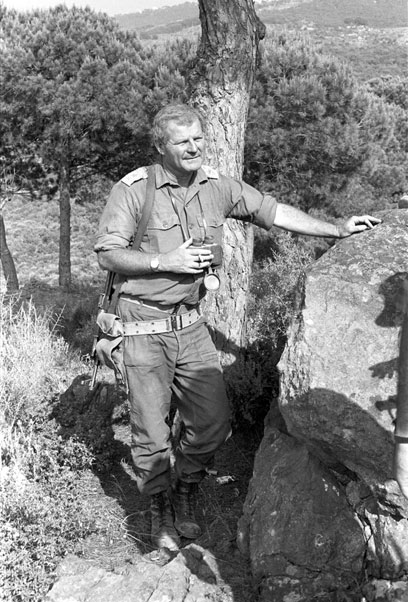
Amir Drori

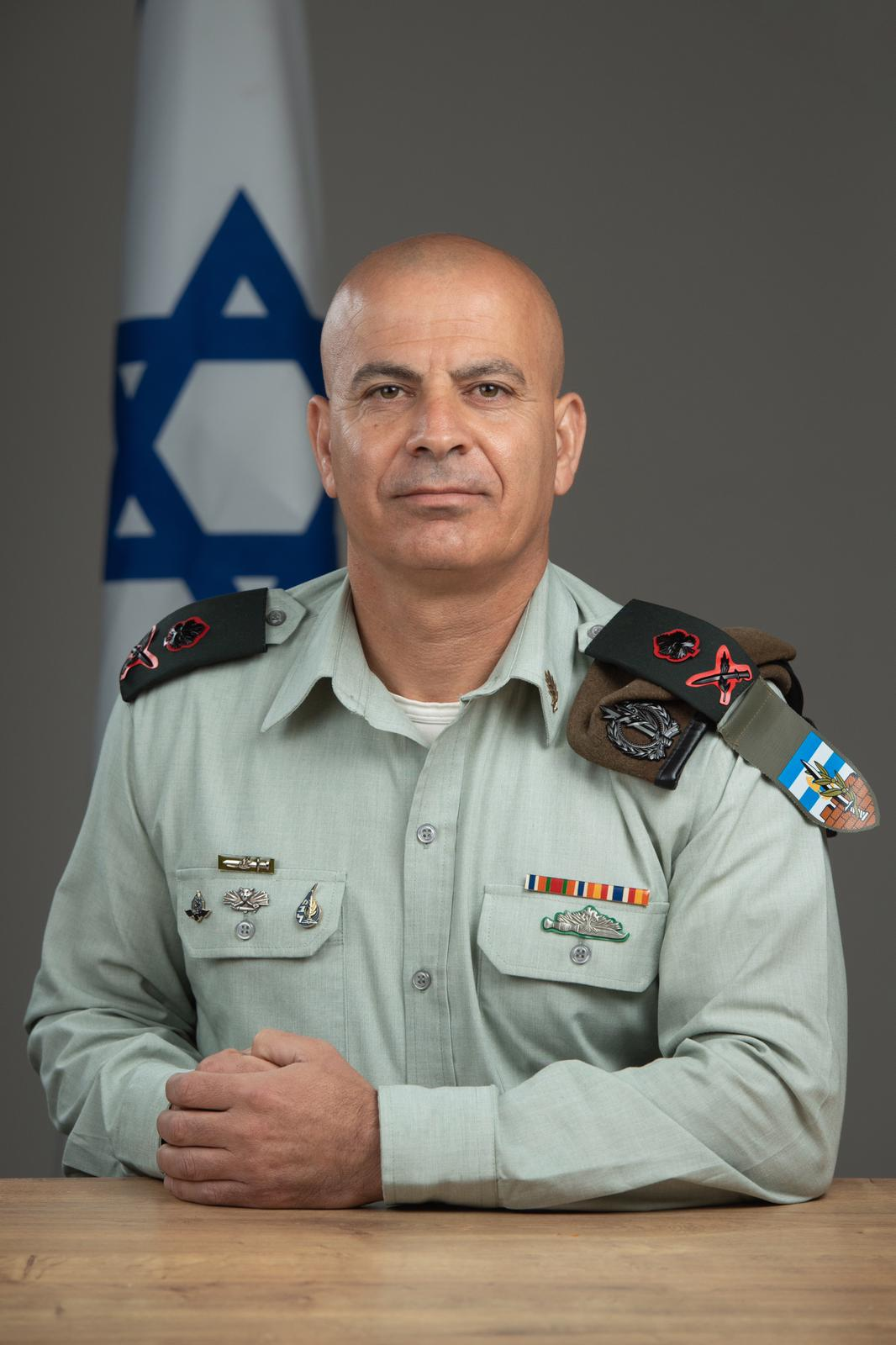
Ghassan Alian, Druze commander

Years	Name	Events during tenure	Rank released
February–May 1948	Moshe Mann	Battles of the Kinarot Valley	Lieutenant Colonel
May–July 1948	Mishael Shaham	Battle of Jenin (1948)	Colonel
1948–1950	Nahum Golan (Spiegel)	Operation Hiram, Operation Uvda	Brigadier General
1950	Dan Laner		Major General
1950–1951	Avraham Yoffe		Major General
1951–1952	Meir Amit (Slutzky)		Major General
1952–1954	Asaf Simhoni		Major General
1954–1955	Issachar Shadmi		Brigadier General
1955–1956	Haim Ben David		Major General
1956–1957	Binyamin Gibli	Suez Crisis	Colonel
1957–1958	Aharon Doron		Major General
1958–1960	Elad Peled		Major General
1960–1961	Aharon Yariv (Rabinovich)		Major General
1961–1963	Mordechai Gur		Lieutenant General
1963–1965	Uri Bar Ratzon		Colonel
1965–1966	Shlomo Alton		Colonel (KIA)
1966–1968	Yona Efrat	Six-Day War	Major General
1968–1970	Yekutiel Adam		Major General (KIA)
1970–1972	Yehuda Golan		Brigadier General
1972–1974	Amir Drori	Yom Kippur War	Major General
1974–1975	Uri Simhoni	War of attrition with Syria	Major General
1975–1976	Haim Binyamini		Brigadier General
1976–1977	Uri Sagi (Eisenberg)		Major General
1977–1978	Amir Reuveni	Operation Litani	Brigadier General
1978–1980	David Katz		Brigadier General
1980–1981	Ilan Biran		Major General
1981–1982	Erwin Lavi	First Lebanon War	Brigadier General
1982–1984	Immanuel Hert		Brigadier General
1984–1986	Zvi Poleg (Farkash)		Brigadier General
1986–1987	Gabi Ofir		Major General
1987–1988	Gabi Ashkenazi		Lieutenant General
1988–1990	Baruch Spiegel		Brigadier General
1990–1991	Moshe Tzin		Brigadier General
1991–1993	Yair Naveh		Major General
1993–1995	Moshe Kaplinsky		Major General
1995–1997	Erez Gerstein		Brigadier General (KIA)
1997–1999	Gadi Eizenkot		Lieutenant General
1999–2001	Shmuel Zakai		Brigadier General
2001–2003	Moshe Tamir (Brigadier General)	Operation Defensive Shield	Brigadier General
2003–2005	Erez Tzukerman		Brigadier General
2005–2008	Tamir Yadai	Second Lebanon War	Brigadier General *
2008–2010	Avi Peled	Operation Cast Lead	Brigadier General
2010–2012	Ofek Bukhris		Brigadier General
2012–2014	Yaniv Asor		Colonel *
2014–2016	Ghassan Alian	Operation Protective Edge	Colonel *
2016–2018	Shlomi Binder		Colonel *
2018–2020	Shai Klapper		Colonel *
2020–2022	Barak Hiram		Colonel *
2022–	Yair Palai		Colonel *
			* – on active duty

=== Bibliography ===
- Baltheim, Avi (1982). "Golani". IDF in its Corps: Army and Security Encyclopedia (in Hebrew). Vol. 11. Revivim Publishing.
- Etzioni, Binyamin, ed. (1951). Tree and Dagger – Battle Path of the Golani Brigade (in Hebrew). Ma'arakhot Publishing.
- Wallach, Jeuda, ed. (1978). "Security". Carta's Atlas of Israel (in Hebrew). Vol. First Years 1948–1961. Carta Jerusalem.
- Wallach, Jeuda, ed. (1980). "Six-Day War". Carta's Atlas of Israel (in Hebrew). Vol. The Second Decade 1961–1971. Carta Jerusalem.
- Wallach, Jeuda, ed. (1983). Carta's Atlas of Israel (in Hebrew). Vol. The Third Decade 1971–1981. Carta Jerusalem.
- Wallach, Jeuda, ed. (2003). Battle Sites in the Land of Israel (in Hebrew). Jerusalem: Carta. ISBN 965-220-494-3.
- Asael Lubotzky (2016). From the Wilderness and Lebanon - A Golani officer's story of war. Koren Publishers Jerusalem. ISBN 978-1592644179.

== See also ==
- IDF code of Ethics
- Nahal brigade
