= Battle of Jenin =

Battle of Jenin may refer to:

- Capture of Jenin (1918), during World War I
- Battle of Jenin (1948), during the 1948 Arab–Israeli War
- Battle of Jenin (2002), during the Second Intifada
- Recurring clashes in Jenin (2023-present) during the Gaza war
