= Brevda =

Russian Jewish surname

Brevda (Russian: бревда, "Truth Teller" or "Justice Deliverer"). It is a surname given to Jewish leaders who were Kohanim (plural of Kohen) in Russia during the Middle Ages. This surname was a modification of Pravda, the Russian word for 'Truth' and 'Justice'.

== Kohanim ==
Kohen families claim direct descent from Aaron, the brother of Moses and many share a common DNA haplogroup.

Kohanim occupy an elevated status in Judaism. Their priestly leadership duties date back to the year 600 BC.

== Brevda Family ==
=== Chaim Noach HaCohen Brevda ===
Rabbi Chaim Noach HaCohen Brevda (1914-1999) was an illustrious and eminent Rabbi in the 20th century. He was born in Baranovitch, Poland, (Lithuania). He studied in various Rabbinical seminaries in Lithuania and he also taught in the Yeshivah in Raduń (also known as Radin). He received his Rabbinical ordination from the Chofetz Chaim. During World War II, he escaped to Japan and later to Shanghai, China, where he studied with the Mir Yeshiva. After the war was over, he entered the United States and ultimately settled in New York City, first in The Bronx and then in Brooklyn. Upon his arrival in New York City, Rabbi Brevda taught in the Yeshiva Chofetz Chaim on the Westside of NYC. After World War II, Rabbi Mendel Zaks, the son - in- law of the Chofetz Chaim, had re-established the yeshivah in the United States. Rabbi Brevda was well known among the survivors of the Rabbinical institutions of Europe, for his knowledge of the oral and written law. He was the Rabbinical leader of Congregation Ahavas Achim of Brownsville and then later of Congregation Bais Avrohum in Brighton Beach. He also established the Yeshivah and Mesifta Tiffereth Avrohum, a post-high school Rabbinical seminary. Rabbi Brevda served as the American liaison for the Yeshivah Shaarai Shamayim, in Jerusalem, Israel. Rabbi Brevda died on September 14, 1999, the 4th of Tishrei 5760. He is buried in Mount Hebron Cemetery in New York.

=== Levi Brevda ===
Levi Brevda was part of an underground Zionist organization in Nesvizh, Belarus in the early 1900s. Brevda relocated Zionist settlers from Lyakhovichi and Minsk out of Eastern Europe to Mandatory Palestine, which later became Israel.

Levi Brevda made aliyah to Israel (then known as the British Mandate) in the 1920s and elected to hebraize his name to Levi Ben Amitai. Once in Israel, Brevda founded the Degania Bet kibbutz, south of the Sea of Galilee, which still exists today. Brevda's kibbutz was integral in defending the Galilee region from the invading Syrian army during the 1948 Arab–Israeli War. "The heroic resistance of the Degania defenders against a regular army [of Syria] gave the people of the young state [of Israel] a large morale boost."

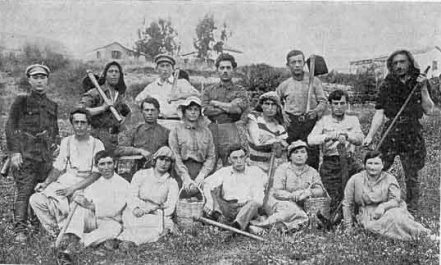
Brevda (pictured in the back row third from the right) founded the Degania Bet Kibbutz in the Galilee region of Israel, before it was officially declared an independent state. Photo: 1921
