= Eli Hurvitz =

Israeli businessman

- אליהו "אלי" הורביץ
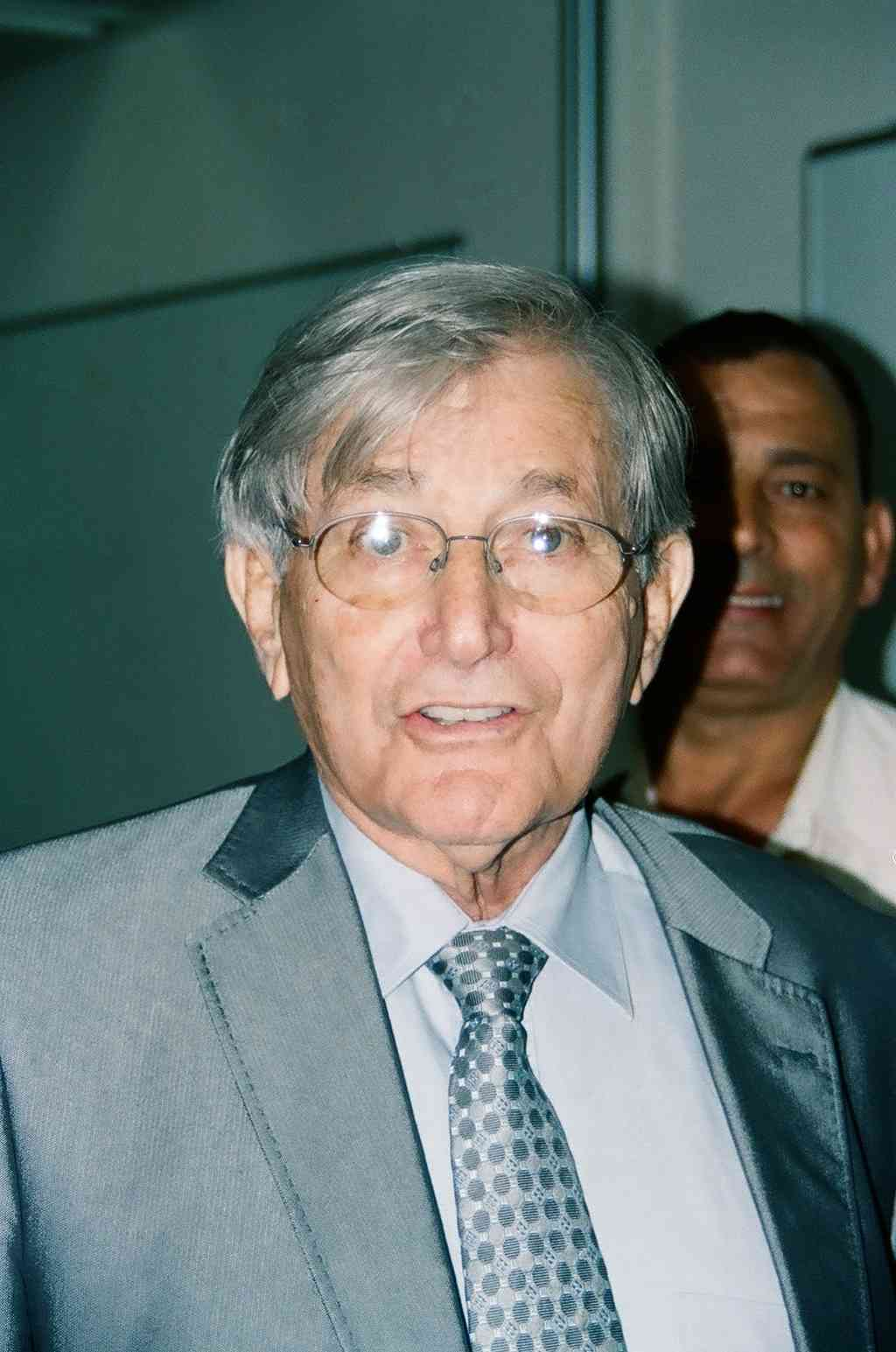
- Born: Eliyahu Hurvitz; April 20, 1932; Jerusalem
- Died: November 21, 2011 (aged 79)
- Citizenship: Israeli
- Education: The Hebrew University of Jerusalem
- Occupation: Industrialist
- Employer: Teva Pharmaceutical Industries
- Title: Chairman of the Board (and former CEO)
- Awards: 2002 Israel Prize for lifetime achievement and special contributions to society and the State

Eliyahu "Eli" Hurvitz (Hebrew: אליהו "אלי" הורביץ; 20 April 1932 – 21 November 2011) was an Israeli industrialist. He was the chairman of the board and former CEO of Teva Pharmaceutical Industries at the time of his death.

== Biography ==
Eliyahu (Eli) Hurvitz was born in Jerusalem, in the British Mandate of Palestine, in 1932. In 1934, his family moved to Tel Aviv. In May 1948, he and his classmates were drafted by the Israel Defense Forces to fight in the 1948 Arab-Israeli War. In early 1949 he resumed his studies for five months and completed his matriculation (Bagrut) exams. After graduation, he joined kibbutz Tel Katzir, where he met Dalia Solomon. In June 1953 they married, and they left the kibbutz in October.

Hurwitz studied economics at the Hebrew University of Jerusalem. He joined Assia Chemical Labs Ltd., a small firm of which Dalia's father was a managing partner, as a dishwasher in the laboratory. After his graduation from Hebrew University in 1957 he began doing office work at Assia and moved to executive ranks. In 1964, Assia merged with Zori and in 1969 acquired a controlling interest in Teva. In 1976, the three firms merged into Teva Pharmaceutical Industries Ltd. with Hurvitz as the CEO. He resigned as CEO in 2002 and handed over the position to Israel Makov, and from then on until his death in 2011 had been the firm's chairman of the board.

Hurvitz served as chairman of the Israel Export Institute from 1974 to 1978. In 1981 he was made president of the Israel Manufacturers Association, a position he held until 1986. From 1985 to 1986 he headed Shimon Peres' economic plan to fight the inflation, for which he was awarded the Industry Prize. In 1986 he was appointed chairman of the board of Bank Leumi. In 1987, he resigned after his name was associated with Israel's bank stock crisis of 1983.

Hurvitz was chairman of the Jerusalem Development Authority from 1989 to 1992; a member of the advisory committee of the Bank of Israel from 1991 to 1995; director of Koor Industries Ltd. from 1997 to 2004; and director of Magal Security System Ltd. from 1992 to 1994. He also served as chairman of the executive committee of the Weizmann Institute of Science from 1989 to 1995. He has been a member of the board of governors of Tel Aviv University since 2001, a director of Vishay Technologies since 1997, and chair of the Israel Democracy Institute since 2002.

In March 1996 he was indicted on charges of an $18 million tax evasion in corporate taxes as head of a Teva subsidiary, Promedico. In 1998 he was convicted by the Jerusalem district court, but was acquitted by the Supreme Court of Israel in 2000.

== Awards and honours ==
Hurvitz received honorary doctorates from the Technion Israel Institute of Technology in 1990, the Weizmann Institute of Science in 1994, Ben-Gurion University in 2002 and Tel Aviv University in 2004.

In 2002, he received the Israel Prize, for lifetime achievement and special contribution to society and the State.

In 2005, Hurvitz was named Business Leader of the Decade by Dun & Bradstreet.

From 2002 to 2005 he served as a member of the international council of the Belfer Center for Science and International Affairs. In 2006, Forbes estimated his wealth at $500 million and listed him as the 30th-richest Israeli.

In 2011, he received the honorary award of the Ariel University Center of Samaria. Horowitz received the award for his many years of promoting high-tech industry, economy and society in Israel.

== See also ==
- List of Israel Prize recipients
