= Moshe Mann =

- משה מן
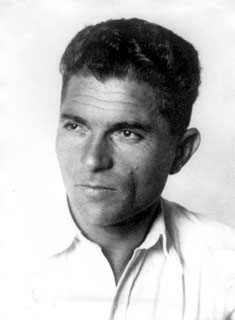
- Moshe, 1948
- Born: 13 April 1907; Turka, Austro-Hungarian Empire
- Died: 17 October 2004 (aged 97); Israel
- Military career
- Allegiance: Israel
- Branch: Palmach; Haganah; Israel Defense Forces
- Service years: 1933–1948
- Commands: Golani Brigade
- Conflicts: 1948 Arab–Israeli War; Battles of the Kinarot Valley

Moshe Mann (Hebrew: משה מן; 13 April 1907 – 17 October 2004) was an Israeli military officer who was the first commander of the Golani Brigade.

== Biography ==
Moshe Mann was born in Turka, Austro-Hungarian Empire (today Ukraine). This area became part of Poland after World War I. He immigrated to Mandatory Palestine in 1926 from Lviv, as part of HaShomer HaTzair movement. He lived in a kibbutz near Haifa and participated in the founding of the National Kibbutz Movement. He joined the Haganah and moved to Merhavia.

== Military career ==
Mann was involved in building several pre-state Jewish police and paramilitary organizations, including the Notrim, Hish and Palmach.

He participated in the Haganah's first rifle course and became an instructor. One of his students was Yigal Allon. He was then responsible for commanding the Afula area forces, and from 1939 the entire Jezreel Valley. During this time he worked with Orde Wingate. In 1942 he was tasked with curbing the activities of the Irgun and Lehi in his area under the nickname "Saadya".

With the forming of the military structure of the Haganah from 1946 onward, Mann was appointed to head the newly created Levanoni Brigade, controlling the north of the country. As the 1947–48 Civil War in Mandatory Palestine broke out, the brigade split into two—Golani and Carmeli—and Mann got the command of Golani. One of Mann's first actions as commander of the north was to organize the Jewish pioneers in the Birya affair.

Mann had tensions with the IDF high command after Moshe Dayan was appointed to an unspecified post in the Golani Brigade, technically higher than a battalion commander (a post usually reserved just for the brigade commander), and Moshe Carmel was appointed his superior as commander of the northern front. After Mann's wife Zilka died in an Iraqi air raid on his home village on 31 May 1948, Mann quit the military and returned home. He died in 2004 at the age of 97.

== See also ==
- Golani Brigade
- Battles of the Kinarot Valley
