= Degania Bet =

Kibbutz in northern Israel

Degania Bet: דְּגַנְיָה ב׳ (Hebrew)

Hebrew transcription(s)
  - Standard: Dganya Bet
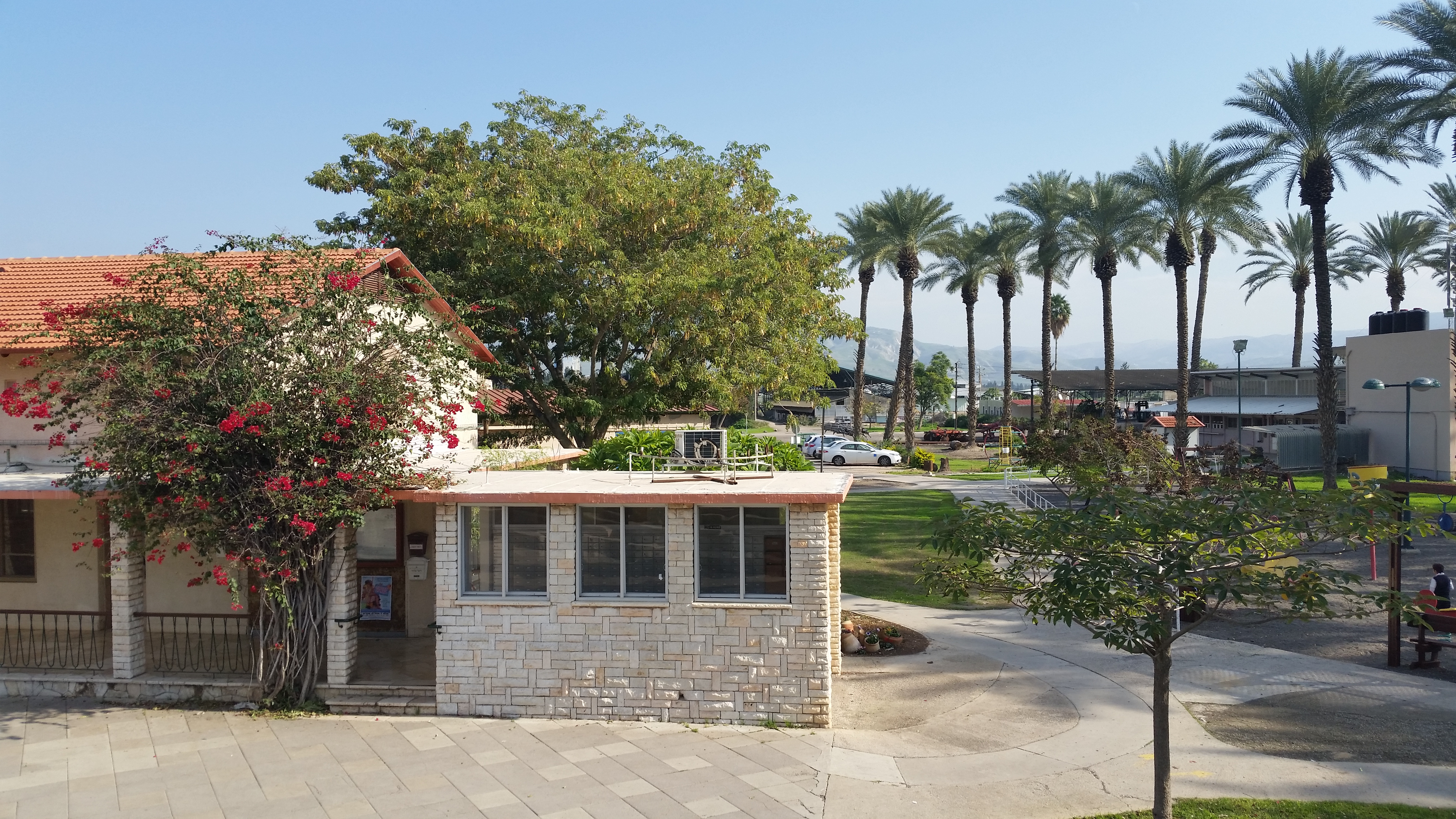

- Location within Northeast Israel Location within Israel
- Coordinates: 32°42′0″N 35°34′33.6″E
- Country: Israel
- District: Northern
- Subdistrict: Kinneret
- Council: Emek HaYarden
- Affiliation: Kibbutz Movement
- Founded: 1920
- Founder: Immigrants from the Second Aliyah
- Population (2024): 765
- Website: www.degania-b.org.il

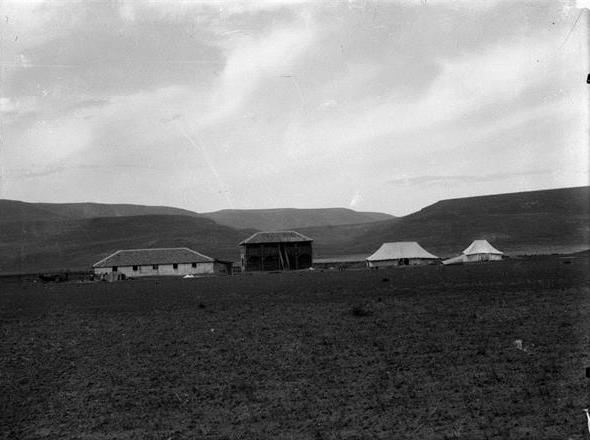
Degania Bet in 1920

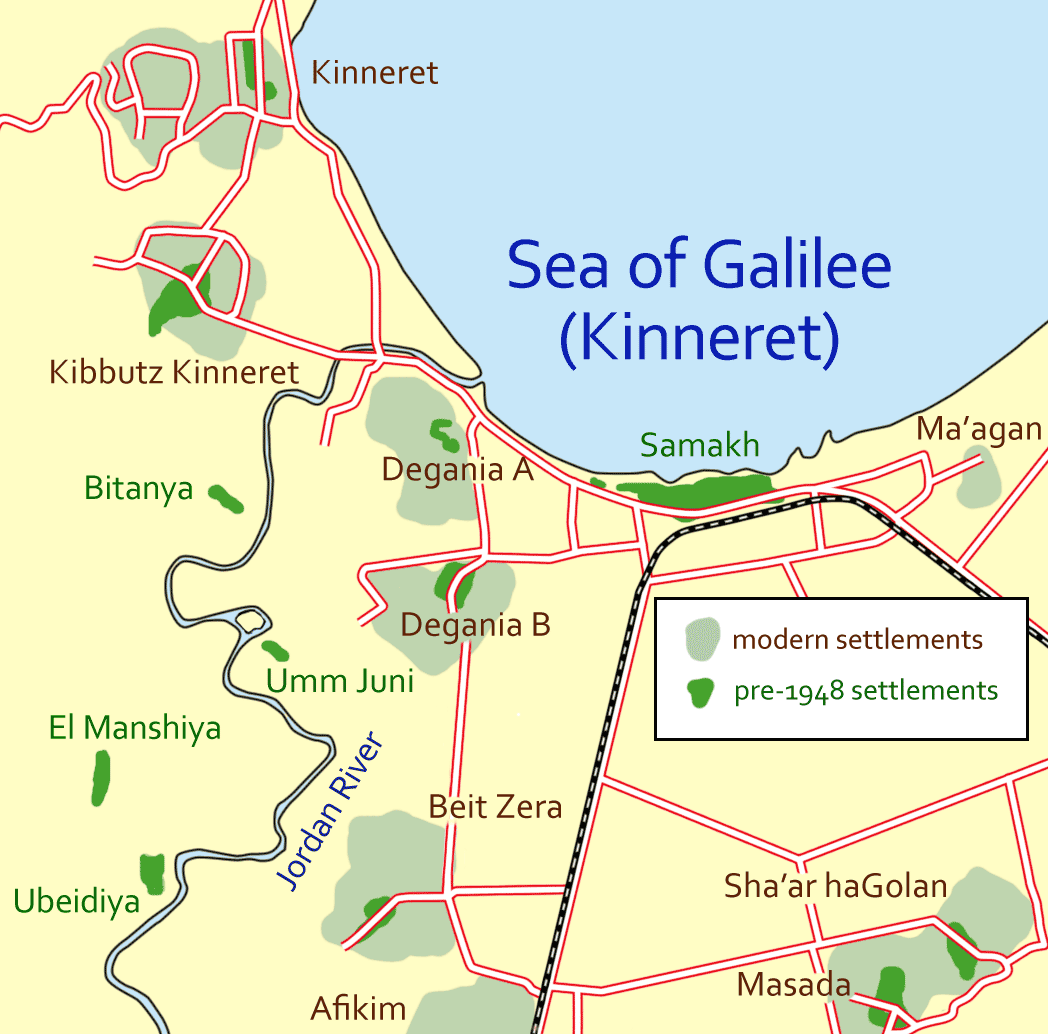
Degania region in historical perspective.

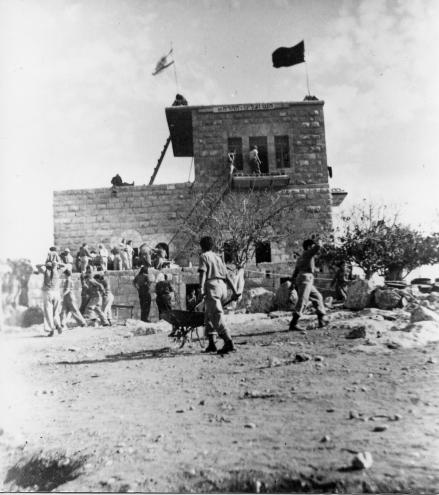
Members of Yiftach Brigade from Kfar Blum training at Degania Bet in 1948

Degania Bet (Hebrew: דְּגַנְיָה ב׳) is a kibbutz in northern Israel. Located to the south of the Sea of Galilee adjacent to Degania Alef, it falls under the jurisdiction of Emek HaYarden Regional Council. Degania Bet was established in 1920. As of 2024, it had a population of 765.

== History ==
Degania Bet was founded in 1920 by immigrants from the Second Aliyah, led by Levi Brevda (Levi Ben Amitai). It was the first planned kibbutz and was designed and built by the German Jewish architect Fritz Kornberg. One of its founders was Levi Eshkol. During the 1920 Palestine riots it was attacked and abandoned for several months.

In the 1931 census of Palestine Degania Bet had a population of 138, all Jews, in a total of 39 houses. During the 1936–39 Arab revolt it served as a base for establishing tower and stockade settlements. Its population had increased to 290, still all Jewish, by the 1945 census.

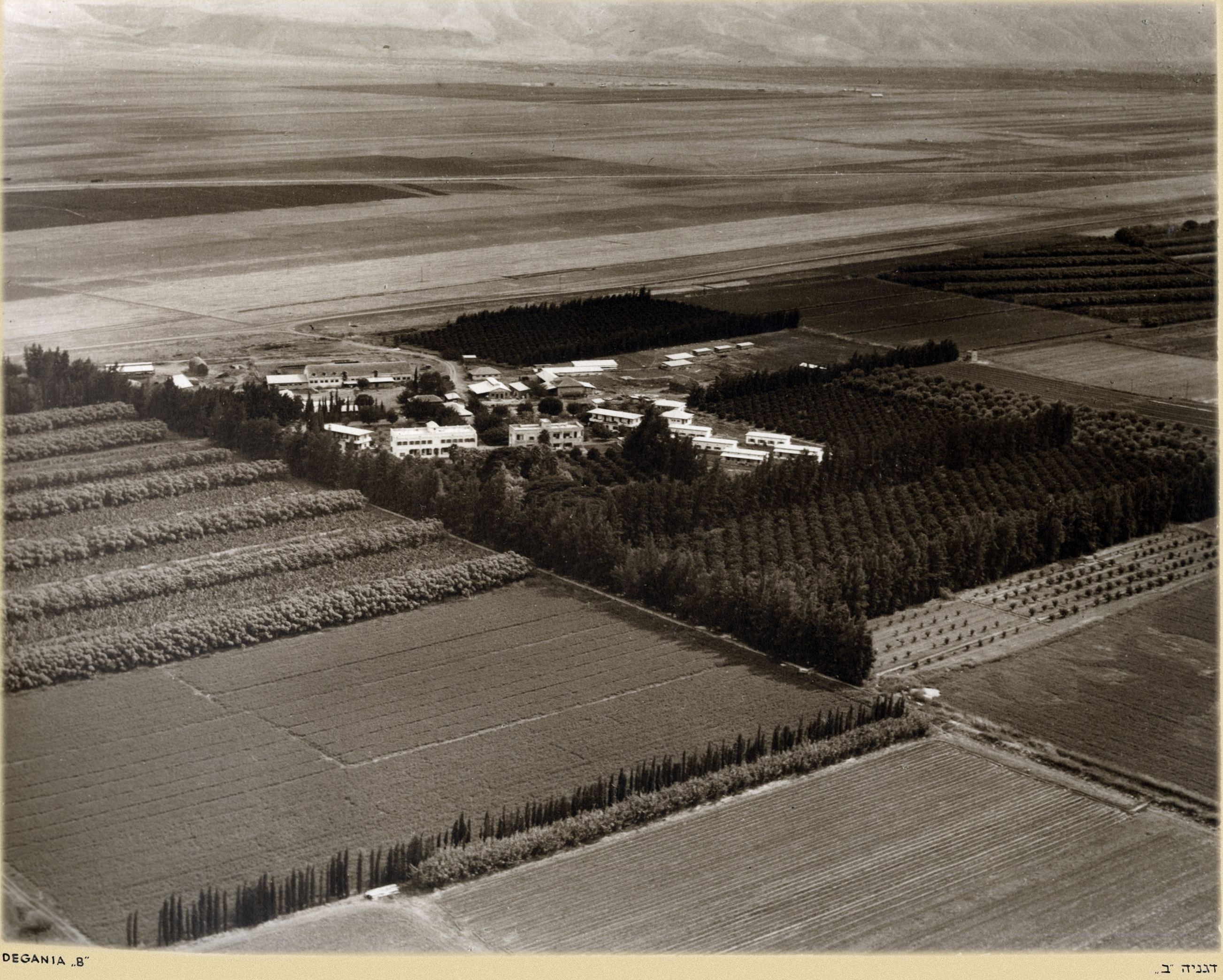
Degania B 1937

On 20 May 1948, during the Battles of the Kinarot Valley, in one of the first battles of the 1948 Arab–Israeli war, the residents of Degania Alef and Bet, assisted by a small number of military personnel, repelled a Syrian attack and succeeded in halting the advance of the Syrian army into the Jordan Valley.

== Economy ==
In addition to its 350 cow dairy herd, crop fields, almond orchards, banana, date and avocado plantations, Degania Bet industrialized in the 1960s with Degania Sprayers, now a green industry; in 1984 it opened the Degania Silicone factory. An additional source of income is its kibbutz cottage tourist accommodation, and it specializes in organized bicycle tours.

== Notable people ==
- Levi Eshkol (1895–1969), third Prime Minister of Israel (1963–69); Degania Bet member
- Michael Kolganov, Soviet-born Israeli sprint canoeist, world champion, bronze medalist at 2000 Summer Olympics; Degania Bet non-member resident in the 2000s
- Kadish Luz, Minister of Agriculture (1955–59) and Speaker of the Knesset (1959–69), acting President for one month in 1963; Degania Bet member
- Gabi Teichner (born 1945), basketball player

== Bibliography ==
- Department of Statistics (1945). Village Statistics, April, 1945. Government of Palestine.
- Mills, E., ed. (1932). Census of Palestine 1931. Population of Villages, Towns and Administrative Areas. Jerusalem: Government of Palestine.
