= Palestinian Intifada =

The term Palestinian Intifada is used to indicate Palestinian uprisings against Israeli control and occupation, and may refer to:

- The First Palestinian Intifada, beginning in 1987, declining in 1991 and coming to an end with the signing of the Oslo accords (August 1993) and the creation of the Palestinian National Authority
- The Second Palestinian Intifada, also known as the al-Aqsa Intifada, beginning in September 2000 and ending on 8 February 2005
