= Battle of Gesher =

Iraqi-Jordanian battle against Israel in 1948

Coordinates: 32°38′30.3″N 35°34′2.6″E

- Part of the 1948 Arab–Israeli War
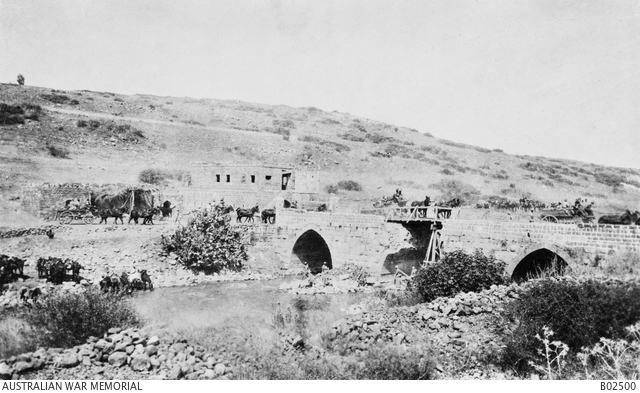
- Bridge connecting Kibbutz Gesher to Naharayim c. 1918
Date	14–22 May 1948
Location	Naharayim, Mandatory Palestine
Result	Israeli victory

Belligerents
Israel	Transjordan; Iraq

Strength
2 infantry battalions 2 French cannons	2 infantry battalions 1 armoured battalion 1 artillery company

Casualties and losses
Unknown	6–21 armoured cars Infantry unknown

The Battle of Gesher was an attempted joint Iraqi-Jordanian advance against the newly created State of Israel during the 1948 Arab-Israeli War. The battle began on May 14, 1948, when the Jewish exclave of Naharayim was stormed by Arab forces in an attempt to reach the town of Afula and link with the First Yarmouk Brigade of the Arab Liberation Army. The battle was a tactical Israeli victory as the Iraqi Army would move south to the cities of Nablus and Jenin to take over the Samarian Front, resulting in the halting of the advance to Afula.

== Background ==
The first stage of the war started when UN Resolution 181 was ratified on November 29, 1947, and the Army of the Holy War along with the Muslim Brothers Group calling to arms the people of the former British Mandate a day later. Gesher was originally a target of the Arab Liberation Army during their original offensives around the Galilee on March 12, 1948. Its strategic position on the confluence of the Jordan, Tabor and Yarmouk rivers and its proximity to both Afula and Naharayim made it a fruitful target for both the Arab Legion and the Royal Iraqi Armed Forces when Transjordan and Iraq invaded the former mandate on May 10 and 14th, respectively. The combined Arab forces had 2 infantry battalions, 1 armoured battalion and 1 artillery company. The forces of the Golani Brigade numbered around 2 infantry battalions and (later in the battle) 2 65mm French cannons.

== Attack ==
On 14 May at 18:00 the Arab Legion and Iraqi forces took over Naharayim, resulting in the bridge connecting Naharayim and Gesher being blown up by sappers from the Golani Brigade on 20:00 local time. However, Arab forces crossed the river at a lower point near the Tabor on the 15th and later crossed the Tabor itself, seizing nearby Camel Hill on the 16th and beginning a siege on the kibbutz. The same day, at 16:00 local time, an Arab offensive into the police fort near the centre of Gesher was repulsed. On the 17th of May, the Golani Brigade conducted an ineffective aerial assault on Camel Hill and was later repulsed during an attack directly afterwards. Around the same time between 6 and 21 armoured cars were destroyed during an offensive on the police fort by Arab forces. Continued failed attacks by both sides would continue until May 21–22 when the Iraqis were repulsed at Belvoir and Kochav Haryaden, later retreating to Narahayim and toward Sea of Galilee before moving a majority of their forces to Nablus and the Samarian Front.
