= Battle of Jenin (1948) =

Battle of the 1948 Arab–Israeli War

- Part of the 1948 Arab–Israeli War
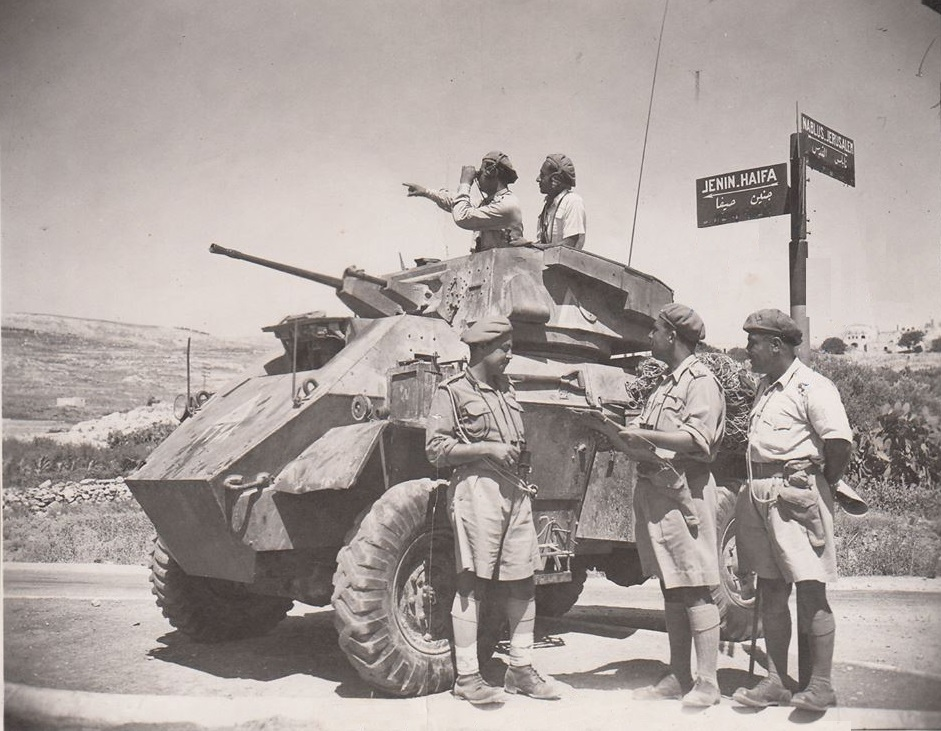
- Soldiers of the Iraqi Army near Jenin, 1948
| Date | 31 May – 4 June 1948 |
| Location | Jenin, Former Mandatory Palestine 32°27′40″N 35°18′00″E |
| Result | Iraqi victory |

Belligerents
| Israel | Kingdom of Iraq; Arab irregulars |

Commanders and leaders
| (Israel) Mordechai Maklef | (Kingdom of Iraq) Omar Ali |

Units involved
| (Israel) Israeli Army; Carmeli Brigade; 13th Battalion, Golani Brigade; (Israel) Israeli Air Force | (Iraq) Iraqi Army; Jenin's garrison; 4th Brigade; 2nd Battalion, 5th Brigade; 1st Battalion, 15th Brigade; Local Arab militias |

Strength
| (Israel) 3,000 | (Iraq) Thousands; 200–300 |

Casualties and losses
| 34 killed, 100 wounded (Israeli claim); 580 killed, 1,000 wounded (Iraqi claim) | 44 Iraqis killed (per local cemetery); 200 killed (Israeli claim) |
- Location within Mandatory Palestine

The Battle of Jenin (31 May – 4 June 1948) was fought between Israel and Iraq, along with Arab irregular forces, during the 1948 Arab–Israeli War.

== Background ==
During the 1948 Arab–Israeli War, the United Nations brokered a ceasefire between the conflict parties, starting on 11 June 1948. The Arab high command consequently sought a way to capture a number of Israeli settlements before the truce would come to effect, with the aim of improving its negotiating position. The Iraqi Army force in Shechem was approached to fulfill this task, and the Iraqi commanders decided to seize Netanya, an important economic hub and harbor town which was considered to be essential for the Israeli war effort. The capture of Netanya would have cut off the northern and southern Israeli forces from each other.

Before attacking Netanya, the Iraqis had to clear the way, and planned to first capture Kfar Yona and then to advance toward the sea. The operation was to start of 4 June. The Iraqi Army's 4th Brigade was supposed to form the bulk of the attacking force, with further support by the 5th Brigade's 2nd Battalion, and the 15th Brigade's 1st Battalion. The offensive was not carried out due to a preemptive IDF offensive in the region, namely against the town of Jenin. Different explanations have been provided for the Israeli offensive: According to historian Pesach Malovany, the Israelis had grown apprehensive about the large number of Iraqi forces concentrated around Shechem and Tulkarm, and wanted to reduce them. According to Northern Command leader Moshe Carmel, it instead was part of a larger operation to cut off the Arab forces from each other along a north–south axis. The direct commander of the offensive, Mordechai Maklef, claimed that the Jenin offensive was actually supposed to prevent the Iraqis in the north from aiding the Jordanian Arab Legion in the south, as the IDF was pushing toward Jerusalem at the time. Carmel has rejected, however, Maklef's version of the events. Yet another reasoning for the offensive has been given by Israeli statesman David Ben-Gurion who said that it was supposed improve Israel's negotiating position before the coming truce. Historian David Tal drew the conclusion that all of these explanations might be partially true, but that the attack on Jenin appears to have been "primarily instinctive".

The IDF ordered about 3,000 troops, mostly part of the Carmeli Brigade (including two mechanized battalions) with support from the Golani Brigade's 13th Battalion to capture Jenin. Meanwhile, several other attacks would take place across the northern frontline, ranging from raids, diversionary actions, to major assaults on important strategic objectives. Besides the Jenin operation, the Alexandroni Brigade was to advance toward Tulkarm, while the Irgun were to capture Ras al-Ein. The entire offensive was codenamed Operation Yitzhak. The attack of Jenin specifically aimed at destroying or at evicting all Arab units from the area. The IDF was in a good position to assault Jenin, as the Golani Brigade had cleared the territory to the town's northeast of Arab irregular forces on 28 May, occupying Megiddo and Lajjun.

== Battle ==
The IDF began its assault on Jenin on 31 May, catching the Arab forces by surprise. The town's garrison was relatively small, consisting of an understrength Iraqi mechanized battalion, a company of armored cars, and a 3.7-inch artillery battery. The Israelis captured the nearby villages of Sandala, Jalame, and Muqeible on the first two days of the battle, while three Israeli planes bombed Jenin. An attack on the Hill 152 north of the town was repelled by the Iraqis, however, and the IDF had to leave military equipment behind as they retreated from the hill. On 2 June, the IDF began to encircle the town to prevent the garrison from fleeing, while the Israeli Air Force continued to carry out bombing raids. By early 3 June, the Israelis had conquered several hills south of Jenin, as well as a fortified Iraqi forward position. Heavy fighting took place, as another assault was launched against Hill 152. The Israelis managed to advance into Jenin and captured most of it, though the garrison continued to hold the old fortress. Despite being greatly weakened by this point, the garrison continued to offer stubborn resistance.

The situation changed, however, as Iraqi reinforcements arrived in the area. The units which had been preparing the offensive against Netanya had been notified of the attack against Jenin, and moved northward. The 4th Brigade's advance force, and the 5th Brigade's 2nd Battalion under Lt. Col. Omar Ali, already arrived on 1 June and helped to stall the Israeli advance south of the town. The Iraqi main force, including heavy artillery, joined the battle on early 3 June. The relief force went into action by striking the IDF at the Qabatiya crossings, and counter-attacking against the southern hills. With increasing numbers of Iraqis arriving in the zone, the Israelis were forced to concede several southern hills. In the night of 3–4 June, an Iraqi assault succeeded in overwhelming the remaining Israeli-held hills around Jenin. The siege was thus broken, though the IDF counter-attacked around 2:15 a.m. on 4 June, aiming at outflanking the Iraqis by conquering the routes from Jenin to Afula and Lajjun. Though bolstered with reinforcements, the Israeli attack was repulsed amid numerous losses.

== Aftermath ==
The exact number of losses among both sides during the battle is disputed. The Israelis argued that they had lost 34 killed, and 100 wounded, while inflicting 200 fatal casualties on the Iraqis and Arab irregulars. Israeli historian Pesach Malovany has considered the IDF claims about Arab losses in the battle to be "somewhat exaggerated" and cited the number of Iraqi soldiers killed as being 27. Iraqi sources claimed far greater IDF casualties, namely 580 Israelis killed and 1,000 wounded. The Iraqis also maintained that they had lost far fewer troops as the Israelis claimed; a local cemetery contains the graves of 44 Iraqi soldiers.

Either way, Jenin marked the only significant Iraqi victory during the war, and was consequently exploited for propaganda purposes. The IDF also won new respect for the Iraqi Army, and Israeli soldiers subsequently called the Iraqis a "frightening nightmare". Back in Iraq, Lt. Col. Omar Ali was treated like a hero for his role in the battle. The Iraqi soldiers killed at Jenin were buried at the "Martyrs' cemetery" in the city; the graves were still maintained and adorned with wreaths and Iraqi flags by 2021, though journalist Alex Shams argued that the role of Iraqi soldiers in the 1948 war was largely forgotten among Palestinians.
