= Tel Katzir =

Kibbutz in northern Israel

Tel Katzir: תל קציר (Hebrew)
- Kibbutz
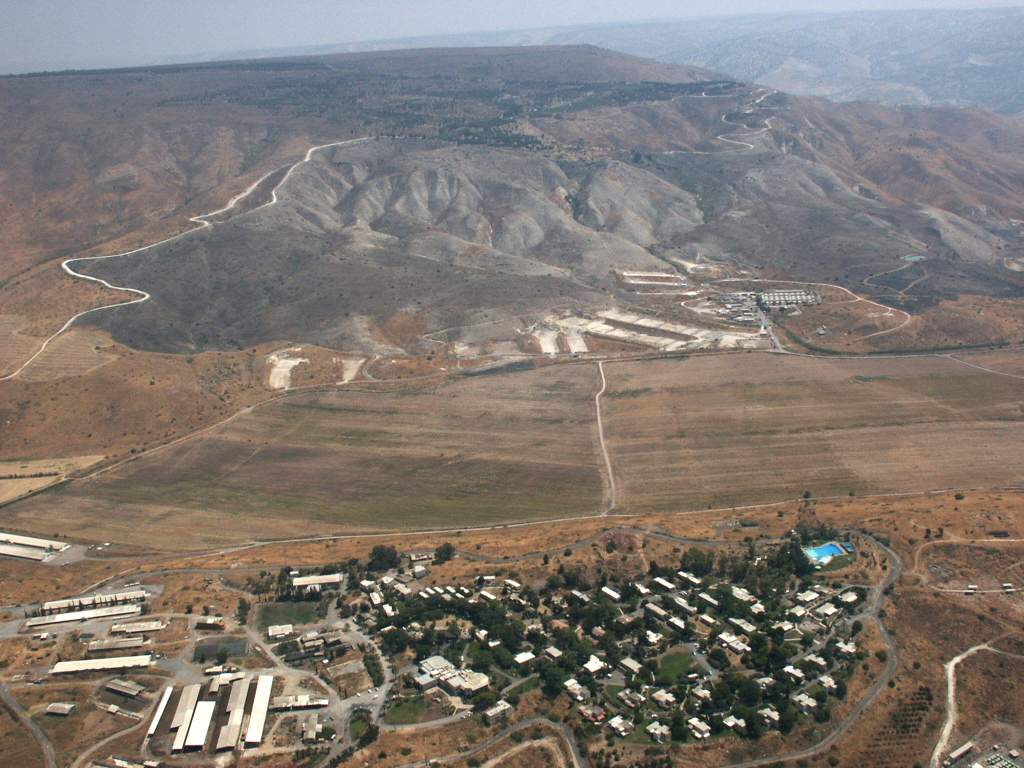
- Etymology: Harvest Hill
- Location within Northeast Israel Location within Israel
- Coordinates: 32°42′21″N 35°37′5″E
- Country: Israel
- District: Northern
- Subdistrict: Kinneret
- Council: Emek HaYarden
- Affiliation: Kibbutz Movement
- Founded: 1949
- Founder: Hebrew Scouts
- Population (2024): 616

Tel Katzir (Hebrew: תל קציר, lit. 'Harvest Hill') is a kibbutz in northern Israel. Located to the south of the Sea of Galilee, it falls under the jurisdiction of Emek HaYarden Regional Council. In 2024 it had a population of 616.

== History ==
The village was founded in 1949 by a gar'in of Hebrew Scouts and a kvutza of youths from kibbutz Afikim.

There is a small museum in the kibbutz about its history and the period between 1948 and 1967. Its name was adapted from the Arabic name for the area, Tell al-Qasr, and also symbolises agriculture. Prime Minister David Ben-Gurion refused to accept the name, insisting that it should be called Beit Katzir because it was not a real tell. However, after the kibbutz's secretariat noted that Tel Aviv was not a real tell, and that Ramat Gan (lit. Garden Heights) was not hilly, they eventually won recognition of their preferred name.

The kibbutz stands 2 km east of the site of the depopulated Palestinian village of Samakh.

Due to the fact it was situated in the Israel–Syria demilitarised zone under the 1949 Armistice Agreements, Tel Katzir was claimed by Syria as its territory during negotiations for a peace agreement in the 1990s. The Israeli government rejected the claims, as it would have led to Syria having territory west of the 1923 border between Mandatory Palestine and the French Mandate of Syria.

== Notable people ==
- Eli Hurvitz (1932–2011), industrialist; chairman of the board and former CEO of Teva Pharmaceutical Industries
- Mark Regev (born 1960), former official spokesperson for the Prime Minister and ambassador to the United Kingdom
