= History of the Israeli–Palestinian conflict =

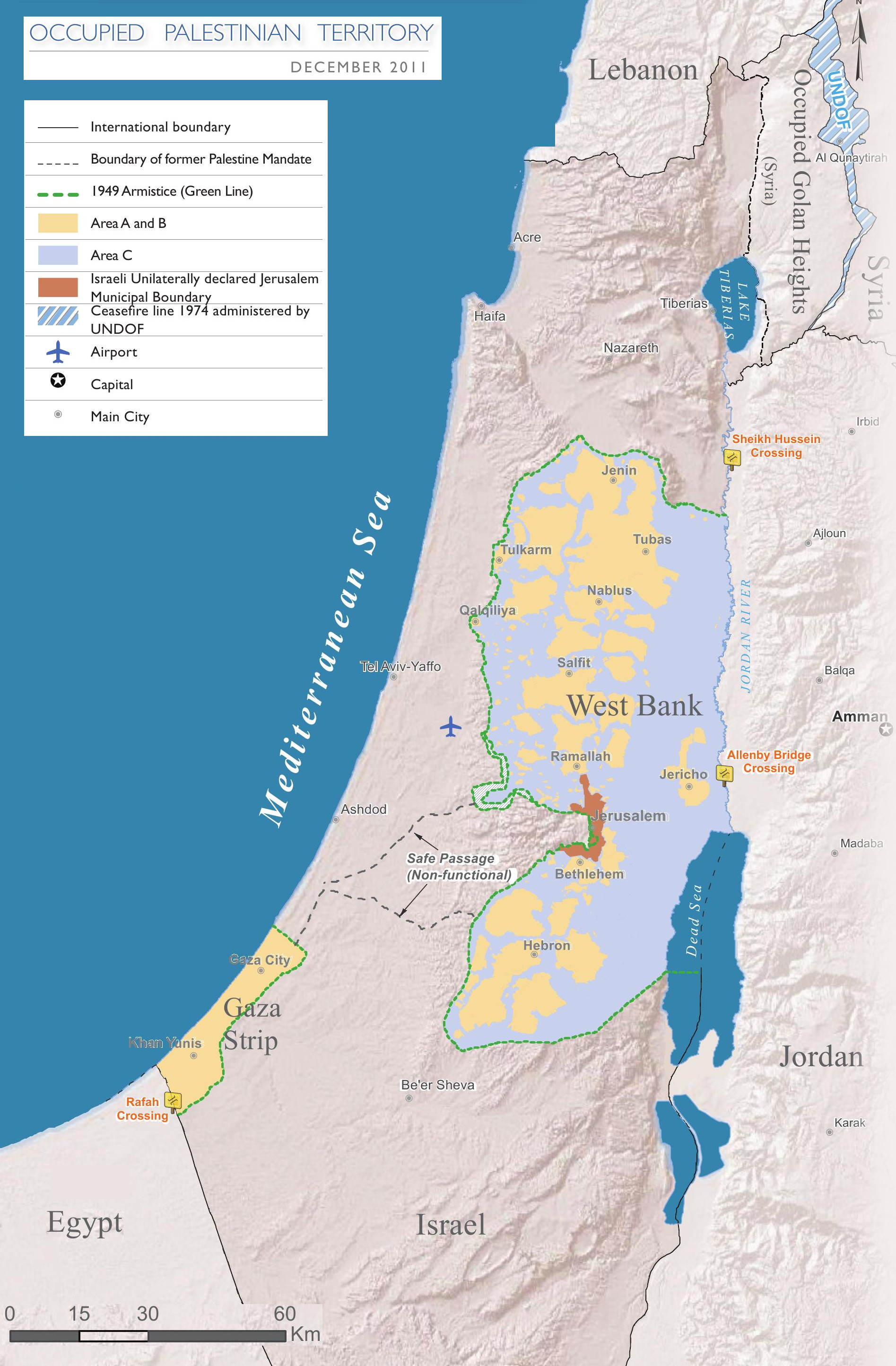
Situation in the Israeli-occupied territories, as of December 2011, per the United Nations OCHA. See here for a more detailed and updated map.

The history of the Israeli–Palestinian conflict traces back to the late 19th century when Zionists sought to establish a homeland for the Jewish people in Ottoman-controlled Palestine, a region roughly corresponding to the Land of Israel in Jewish tradition. The Balfour Declaration of 1917, issued by the British government, endorsed the idea of a Jewish homeland in Palestine, which led to an influx of Jewish immigrants to the region. Following World War II and the Holocaust, international pressure mounted for the establishment of a Jewish state in Palestine, leading to the creation of Israel in 1948.

The establishment of Israel, and the war that followed and preceded it, led to a major demographic change in the form of displacement of hundreds of thousands of Palestinians, sparking a decades-long conflict between Israel and the Palestinian people. In the 1967 war, Israel expanded its borders to include, among others, the West Bank and the Gaza Strip, territories that in 1948 absorbed a large part of the displaced Palestinian population. The Palestinians seek to establish their own independent state in at least one part of historic Palestine. Israel cites defense of its own borders and Palestinian internal political violence as reasons why a Palestinian state is not feasible. A majority of United Nations member states recognise Palestine as an independent state, but this does not currently reflect the situation on the ground; Israel maintains effective control over the West Bank, while the Gaza Strip, despite not being under direct Israeli control since 2005, has been under a blockade by Israel and Egypt.

Numerous peace negotiations have taken place over the years, but a long-term settlement has not been reached. The conflict has been marked by violence, including Palestinian political violence and Israeli military operations. The United States and other countries have played a role in attempting to broker peace, although Israel views the United States as its strategic ally rather than a neutral third party. Numerous obstacles remain, including the issue of Israeli settlements in the West Bank, the status of Jerusalem, and the ultimate fate of Palestinian refugees.

== Background ==
=== National movements ===
Before World War I, the region regarded as Palestine, then the southern part of Ottoman Syria, was under the control of the Ottoman Empire for nearly 400 years, and under the control of Muslims for about 1250-1300 years, minus the roughly 200-year intervening period of the Crusades. (Note: The Rashidun Caliphate, a Muslim state, conquered Palestine in 636-640, replacing the Byzantine Empire, a Christian state, as the rulers of the territory. The Crusaders reached Palestine in 1097 and their rule ended with the fall of Acre in 1291.)

Towards the end of the 19th century, Palestine, which was divided between the Mutasarrifate of Jerusalem, Syria Vilayet and Beirut Vilayet, was inhabited predominantly by Arab Muslims, both farmers and Bedouin (the latter living principally in the Negev and Jordan Valley), with smaller numbers of Christians (mostly Arabs), Druze, Circassians and Jews (predominantly Sephardic). At that time most of the Jews worldwide lived outside Palestine, predominantly in eastern and central Europe, with significant communities in the Mediterranean, the Middle East and the Americas.

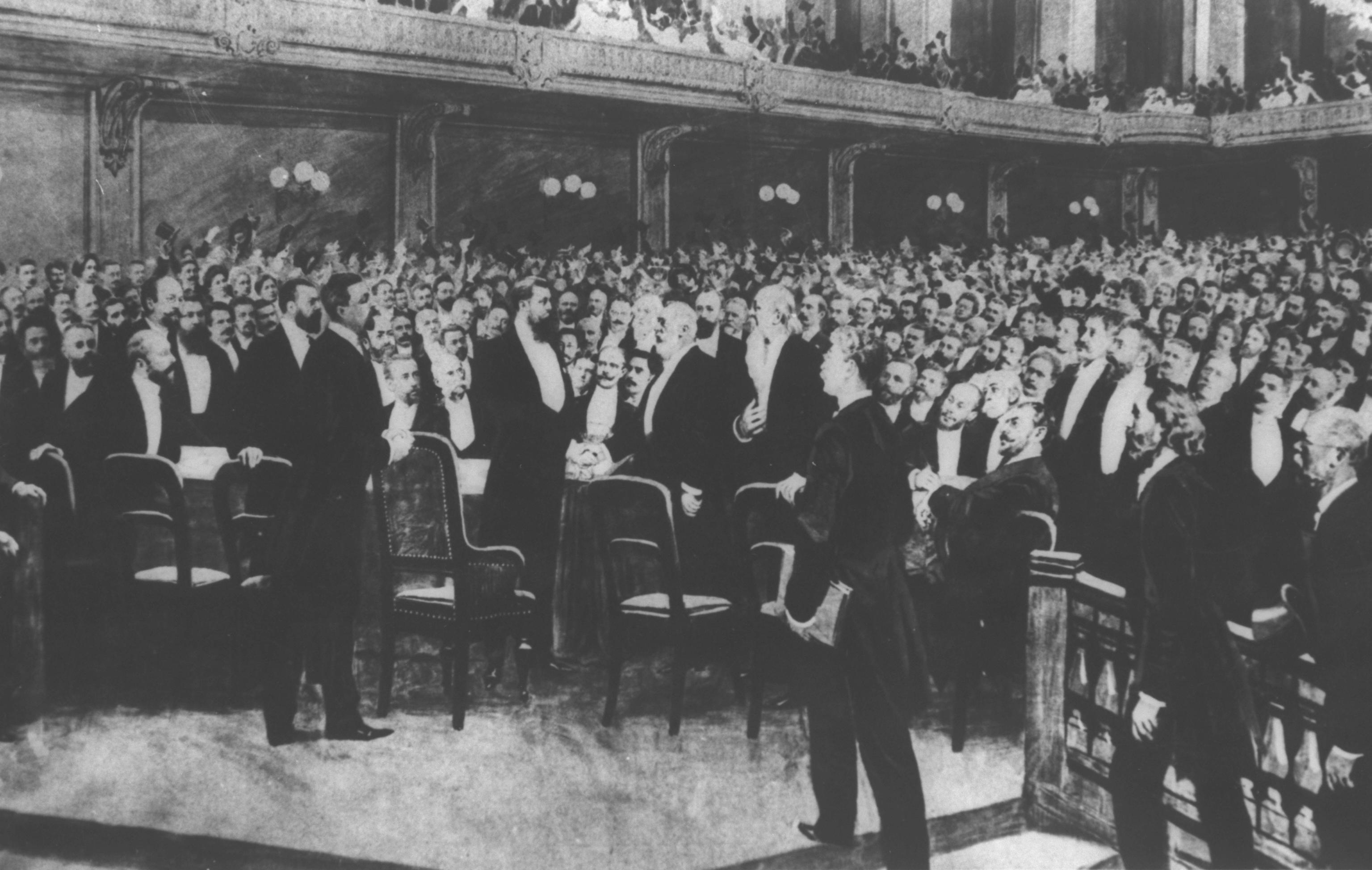
The delegates at the First Zionist Congress, held in Basel, Switzerland (1897)

The roots of the conflict can be traced to the late 19th century, with the rise of national movements, including Zionism and Arab nationalism. Though the Jewish aspiration to return to Zion had been part of Jewish religious thought for more than a millennium, the Jewish population of Europe and to some degree Middle East began to more actively discuss immigration back to the Land of Israel, and the re-establishment of the Jewish Nation, only between 1859 and the 1880s, largely as a solution to the widespread persecution of Jews, and antisemitism in Russia and Europe. As a result, Zionism was established as a political movement in 1897.

The Zionist movement called for the establishment of a nation state for the Jewish people in Palestine, which would serve as a haven for the Jews of the world and in which they would have the right of self-determination. Zionists increasingly came to hold that this state should be in their historic homeland, which they referred to as the Land of Israel. The World Zionist Organization and the Jewish National Fund encouraged immigration and funded purchase of land, both under Ottoman rule and under British rule, in the region of Palestine. Meanwhile, Arab nationalism, at least in an early form, and Syrian nationalism were the dominant tendencies, along with continued loyalty to the Ottoman state, in the area.

According to Benny Morris, among the first recorded violent incidents between Arabs and the newly immigrated Jews in Palestine was the accidental shooting death of an Arab man in Safed, during a wedding in December 1882, by a Jewish guard of the newly formed moshava (Jewish agricultural settlement) Rosh Pinna. In response, about 200 Arabs descended on the Jewish settlement throwing stones and vandalizing property. Another incident happened in Petah Tikva (the first modern Jewish agricultural settlement, moshava, in Palestine), where in early 1886 the Jewish settlers demanded that their Arab tenants vacate the disputed land and started encroaching on it. On March 28, a Jewish settler crossing this land was attacked and robbed of his horse by Yahudiya Arabs, while the settlers confiscated nine mules found grazing in their fields, though it is not clear which incident came first and which was the retaliation. The Jewish settlers refused to return the mules, a decision viewed as a provocation. The following day, when most of the settlement's men folk were away, fifty or sixty Arab villagers attacked Petach Tikva, vandalizing houses and fields and carrying off much of the livestock. Four Jews were injured and a fifth, an elderly woman with a heart condition, died four days later.

By 1908, thirteen Jews had been killed by Arabs, with four of them killed in what Benny Morris calls "nationalist circumstances", the others in the course of robberies and other crimes. In the next five years twelve Jewish settlement guards were killed by Arabs. Settlers began to speak more and more of Arab "hatred" and "nationalism" lurking behind the increasing depredations, rather than mere "banditry".

Zionist ambitions were increasingly identified as a threat by the Arab leaders in Palestine region. Certain developments, such as the acquisition of lands from Arab owners for Jewish settlements, which led to the eviction of the fellaheen from the lands which they cultivated as tenant farmers, aggravated the tension between the parties and caused the Arab population in the region of Palestine to feel dispossessed of their lands. Ottoman land-purchase regulations were invoked following local complaints in opposition to increasing immigration. Ottoman policy makers in the late 19th century were apprehensive of the increased Russian and European influence in the region, partly as a result of a large immigration wave from the Russian Empire. The Ottoman authorities feared the loyalty of the new immigrants not so much because of their Jewishness but because of concern that their loyalty was primarily to their country of origin, Russia, with whom the Ottoman Empire had a long history of conflicts: immigrant loyalty to Russia might ultimately undermine Turkish control in the region of Palestine. This concern was fomented by the example seen in the dismantling of Ottoman authority in the Balkan region. European immigration was also considered by local residents to be a threat to the cultural make-up of the region. The regional significance of the anti-Jewish riots (pogroms) in Russia in the late 19th and early 20th centuries and anti-immigration legislation being enacted in Europe was that Jewish immigration waves began arriving in Palestine (see First Aliyah and Second Aliyah). As a result of the extent of the various Zionist enterprises which started becoming apparent, the Arab population in the Palestine region began protesting against the acquisition of lands by the Jewish population. As a result, in 1892 the Ottoman authorities banned land sales to foreigners. By 1914 the Jewish population in Palestine had risen to over 60,000, with around 33,000 of these being recent settlers.

=== World War I and aftermath (1917–1920) ===
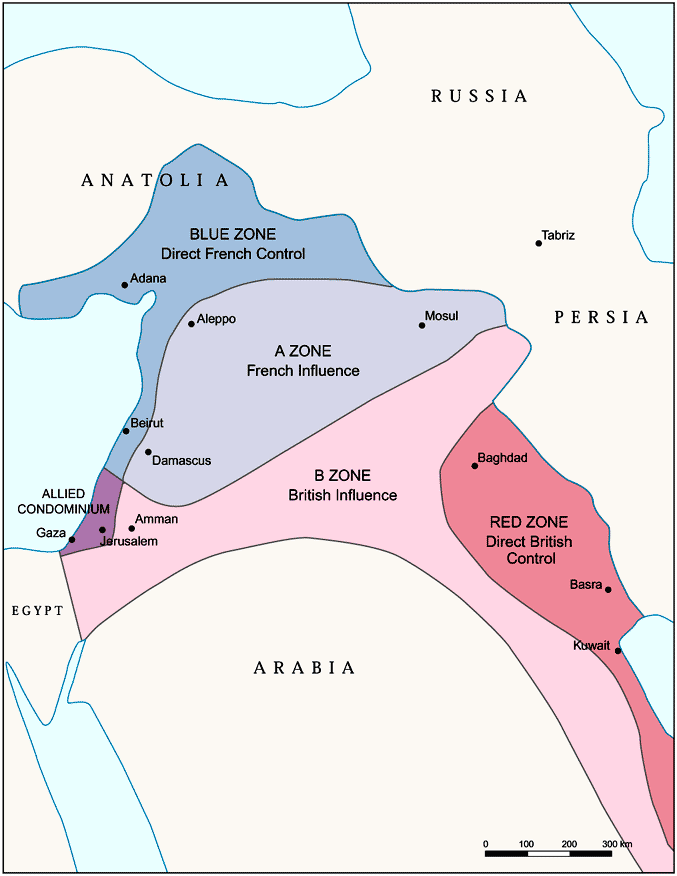
French and British influence and control according to the 1916 Sykes–Picot Agreement

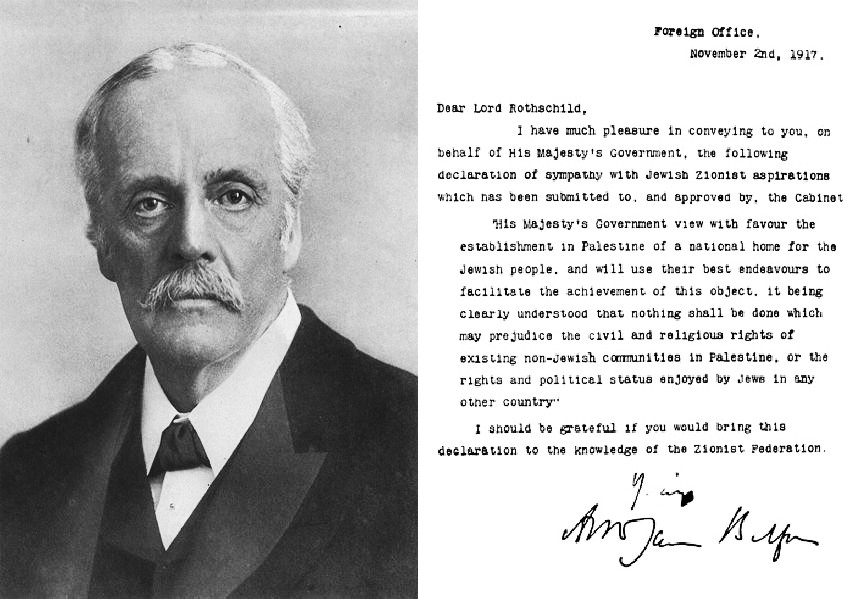
The 1917 Balfour Declaration, which supported the establishment of a Jewish homeland in Palestine and protected the civil and religious rights of existing non-Jewish communities

As a result of a mutual defense treaty that the Ottoman Empire made with Germany, during World War I the Ottoman Empire joined the Central Powers opposed to Great Britain and France. The possibility of releasing Palestine from the control of the Ottoman Empire led the new Jewish population and the Arab population in Palestine to support the alignment of the United Kingdom, France, and Russia during World War I. In 1915, the McMahon–Hussein Correspondence was formed as an agreement with Arab leaders to grant sovereignty to Arab lands under Ottoman control to form an Arab state in exchange for the Great Arab Revolt against the Ottomans. However, Palestine was "ambiguously omitted" from the Arab state and the Balfour Declaration in 1917 proposed to "favour the establishment in Palestine of a national home for the Jewish people, but that nothing should be done to prejudice the civil and religious rights of the existing non-Jewish communities in Palestine." In 1916, the Anglo-French Sykes–Picot Agreement allocated to the British Empire the area of present-day Jordan, Israel, the Palestinian territories, and the area of present-day Iraq. The Balfour Declaration was seen by Jewish nationalists as the cornerstone of a future Jewish homeland on both sides of the Jordan River, but increased the concerns of the Arab population in the Palestine region.

In 1917, the British succeeded in defeating the Ottoman Turkish forces and occupied the Palestine region. The land remained under British military administration for the remainder of the war.

On January 3, 1919, future president of the World Zionist Organization Chaim Weizmann and the future King Faisal I of Iraq signed the Faisal-Weizmann Agreement in which Faisal provisionally accepted the Balfour Declaration conditional on the fulfillment of British wartime promises of Palestine being included in the area of Arab independence.

At the 1919 Paris Peace Conference and Treaty of Versailles, Turkey's loss of its Middle East Empire was formalized.

=== Intercommunal violence in Mandatory Palestine ===
==== Before World War II ====
After World War I and the collapse of the Ottoman Empire, in April 1920 the Allied Supreme Council meeting at San Remo granted to Britain the mandates for Palestine and Transjordan (the territories that include the area of present-day Israel, Jordan, West Bank and the Gaza Strip), endorsing the terms of the Balfour Declaration. Historian Laura Robson has described this as part of the "colonial practice of territorializing sectarian identity" whereby the "designation "Jewish" would carry with it all sorts of political baggage totally absent from the prior experience of the many Jewish communities of the Arab Ottoman world and their Muslim and Christian compatriots".

In August 1920, this was officially acknowledged in the Treaty of Sèvres. Both Zionist and Arab representatives attended the conference, where they met and signed an agreement to cooperate. The agreement was never implemented. The borders and terms under which the mandate was to be held were not finalized until September 1922. Article 25 of the mandate specified that the eastern area (then known as Transjordan or Transjordania) did not have to be subject to all parts of the Mandate, notably the provisions regarding a Jewish national home. This was used by the British as one rationale to establish an autonomous Arab state under the mandate, which it saw as at least partially fulfilling the undertakings in the Hussein-McMahon Correspondence. On April 11, 1921, the British passed administration of the eastern region of the British Mandate to the Hashemite Arab dynasty from the Hejaz region (a region located in present-day Saudi Arabia) and on May 15, 1923 recognized it as an autonomous state, thereby eliminating Jewish national aspirations on that part of the Mandatory Palestine. The mandate over Transjordan ended on May 22, 1946, when the Hashemite Kingdom of Transjordan (later Jordan) gained independence.

Palestinian nationalism was marked by a reaction to the Zionist movement and to Jewish settlement in Palestine as well as by a desire for self-determination by the Arab population in the region. Jewish immigration to Palestine continued to grow significantly during the period of the British Mandate in Palestine, mainly due to the growth of anti-Semitism in Europe. Between 1919 and 1926, 90,000 immigrants arrived in Palestine because of the anti-Semitic manifestations, such as the pogroms in Ukraine in which 100,000 Jews were killed. Some of these immigrants were absorbed in Jewish communities established on lands purchased legally by Zionist agencies from absentee landlords. In some cases, a large acquisition of lands, from absentee landlords, led to the replacement of the fellahin tenant farmers with European Jewish settlers, causing Palestinian Arabs to feel dispossessed. Jewish immigration to Palestine was especially significant after the rise of the Nazis to power in Germany, following which the Jewish population in Palestine doubled, although German Jews accounted for no more than about one-fourth of Jewish migrants to Palestine during 1932-1939. (Note: 247,000 Jewish migrants arrived in Palestine from 1932 to 1939. The number of German Jews who migrated to Palestine from the beginning of 1933 until the end of 1937 is 43,000 and the number of German Jews who migrated to Palestine from August 1933 until 1939 under the Haavara Agreement is estimated at 60,000 or less.)

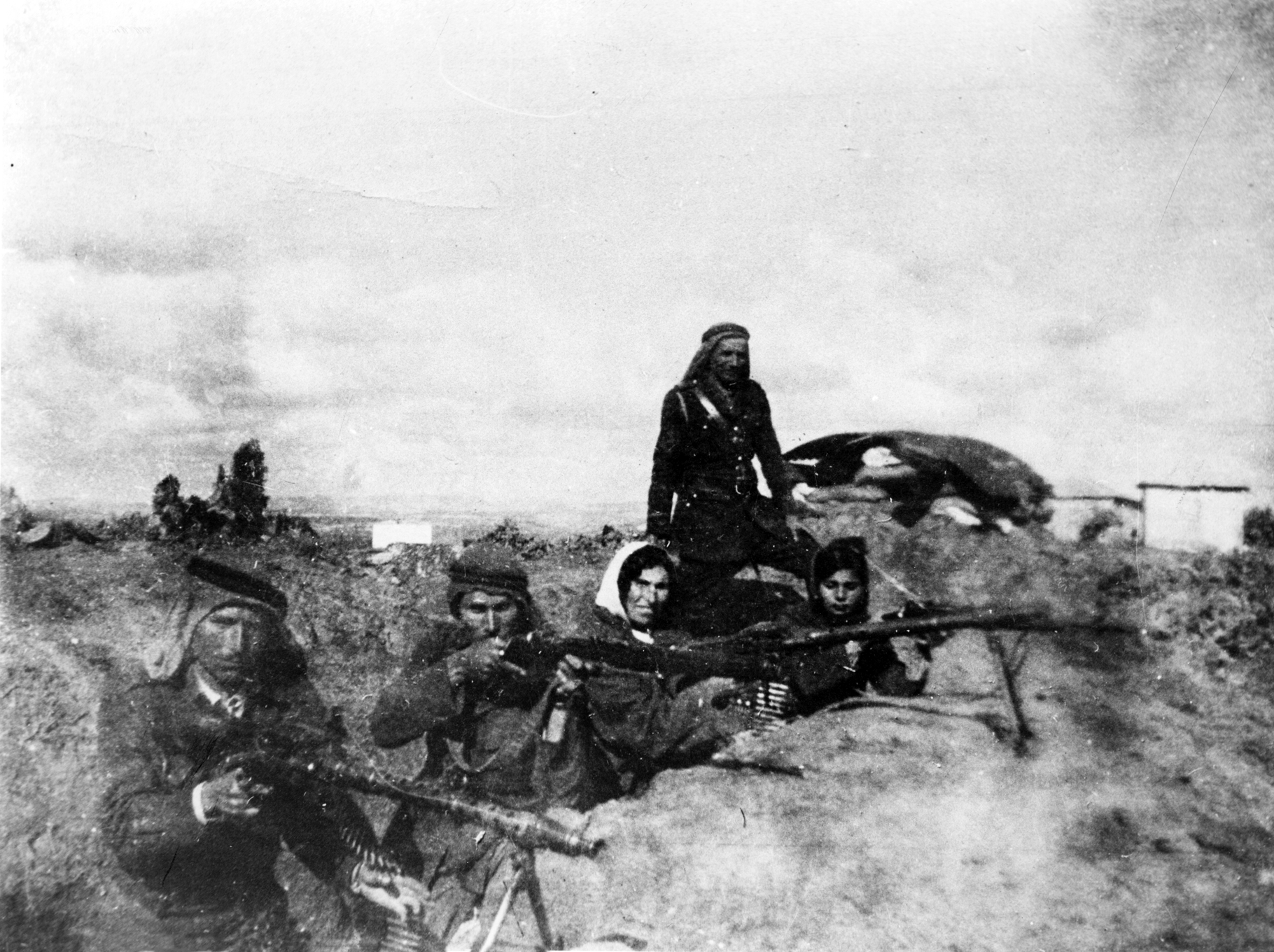
1936–39 Arab revolt in Palestine

The Arab population in Palestine opposed the increase of the Jewish population because the new immigrants refused to lease or sell land to Palestinians, or hire them. During the 1920s relations between the Jewish and Arab populations deteriorated and the hostility between the two groups intensified.

From 1920, the Grand Mufti of Jerusalem Haj Mohammad Amin al-Husayni became the leader of the Palestinian Arab movement and played a key role in inciting religious riots against the Jewish population in Palestine. The Mufti stirred religious passions against Jews by alleging that Jews were seeking to rebuild the Jewish Temple on the site of the Dome of the Rock and Jami Al-Aqsa.

The first major riots against the Jewish population in Palestine were the Jaffa riots in 1921. As a result of the Jaffa riots, the Haganah was founded as a defense force for the Jewish population of the British Mandate for Palestine. Religious tension over the Kotel and the escalation of the tensions between the Arab and Jewish populations led to the 1929 Palestine riots. In these religious-nationalist riots, Jews were massacred in Hebron. Devastation also took place in Safed and Jerusalem.

==== Haavara Agreement and uptick in migration ====
In August 1933, Germany and Zionist organizations signed the Haavara Agreement, which promoted migration of German Jews to Mandatory Palestine. According to calculations published in 1938, out of 135,000 Jews who were driven out of Germany from the beginning of 1933 until the end of 1937, 43,000 went to Palestine. This was one of multiple factors resulting in the doubling of Palestine's Jewish population from about 175,000 in 1931 to an estimated 384,000 in 1936.

==== 1936–1939 Arab revolt in Palestine ====
The 1936-1939 Arab revolt in Palestine was a conflict between Palestinian Arabs on one side, and British and Jewish armed formations on the other. The revolt was suppressed by the British and by the Notrim (Jewish Settlement Police and Jewish Supernumerary Police), which, while formally answering to the British authorities, were actually controlled by the Zionist militant organization Haganah.

In October 1935, in the so-called "Cement Incident", an attempt by the Haganah to smuggle weapons and 400,000 rounds of ammunition into Mandatory Palestine was discovered. The next month, al-Qassam, a Palestinian leader advocating an armed uprising against the Zionists and the British, was killed. In April 1936, armed Arabs, presumably followers of al-Qassam, killed two random Jews; then the Haganah killed two random Arabs. On 19 April 1936, clashes began in Jaffa; when a crowd of Arabs marched on a Jewish-owned bank, police or guards fired into the crowd, killing two Arabs, and mobs of Arabs killed nine Jews in the streets. The British government of Palestine proclaimed a state of emergency. An Arab general strike and revolt ensued that lasted until October 1936.

However, after the Peel Commission proposed, in July 1937, the partition of Mandatory Palestine into a Jewish state and an Arab state, the revolt resumed, and in September 1937 L.Y. Andrews, a British official, was assassinated by Palestinians. Amin al-Husayni, the mufti of Jerusalem who was wanted by the British, fled Palestine and took refuge successively in Lebanon, Iraq, Italy and finally Nazi Germany.

The number of Arab fatalities resulting from 1936–39 Arab revolt in Palestine is estimated to be 5,000 while the number of Jewish fatalities is estimated to be about 500.

==== British proposals ====
The British responded to the outbreaks of violence with the Haycraft Commission of Inquiry (1921), the Shaw Report (1930), the Peel Commission of 1936–1937, the Woodhead Commission (1938) and the White Paper of 1939.

The Peel Commission of 1937 was the first to propose a two-state solution to the conflict, whereby Palestine would be divided into two states: one Arab state and one Jewish state. The Jewish state would include the coastal plain, Jezreel Valley, Beit She'an and the Galilee, while the Arab state would include Transjordan, Judea and Samaria, the Jordan Valley, and the Negev. The 2 main Jewish leaders, Chaim Weizmann and David Ben-Gurion convinced the Zionist Congress to approve continued negotiations with the British even though it rejected the detailed plan. The Arab leadership in Palestine rejected the conclusions and refused to share any land in Palestine with the Jewish population. The rejection of the Peel Commission's proposal by The Arabs led to the establishment of the Woodhead Commission. The Woodhead Commission considered three different plans, one of which was based on the Peel plan. Reporting in 1938, the Commission rejected the Peel plan primarily on the grounds that it could not be implemented without a massive forced transfer of Arabs (an option that the British government had already ruled out). With dissent from some of its members, the Commission instead recommended a plan that would leave the Galilee under British mandate, but emphasised serious problems with it that included a lack of financial self-sufficiency of the proposed Arab State. The British Government accompanied the publication of the Woodhead Report by a statement of policy rejecting partition as impracticable due to "political, administrative and financial difficulties".

In May 1939 the British government released a new policy paper which sought to implement a one-state solution in Palestine, significantly reduced the number of Jewish immigrants allowed to enter Palestine by establishing a quota for Jewish immigration which was set by the British government in the short-term and which would be set by the Arab leadership in the long-term. The quota also placed restrictions on the rights of Jews to buy land from Arabs, in an attempt to limit the socio-political damage. These restrictions remained until the end of the mandate period, a period which occurred in parallel with World War II and the Holocaust, during which many Jewish refugees tried to escape from Europe. As a result, during the 1930s and 1940s the leadership of the Yishuv arranged a couple of illegal immigration waves of Jews to the British Mandate of Palestine (see also Aliyah Bet), which caused even more tensions in the region.

Ben-Gurion said he wanted to "concentrate the masses of our people in this country [Palestine] and its environs." When he proposed accepting the Peel proposals in 1937, which included a Jewish state in part of Palestine, Ben-Gurion told the twentieth Zionist Congress, "The Jewish state now being offered to us is not the Zionist objective. [...] But it can serve as a decisive stage along the path to greater Zionist implementation. It will consolidate in Palestine, within the shortest possible time, the real Jewish force, which will lead us to our historic goal". In a discussion in the Jewish Agency he said that he wanted a Jewish-Arab agreement "on the assumption that after we become a strong force, as a result of the creation of the state, we shall abolish partition and expand to the whole of Palestine."

==== During World War II ====
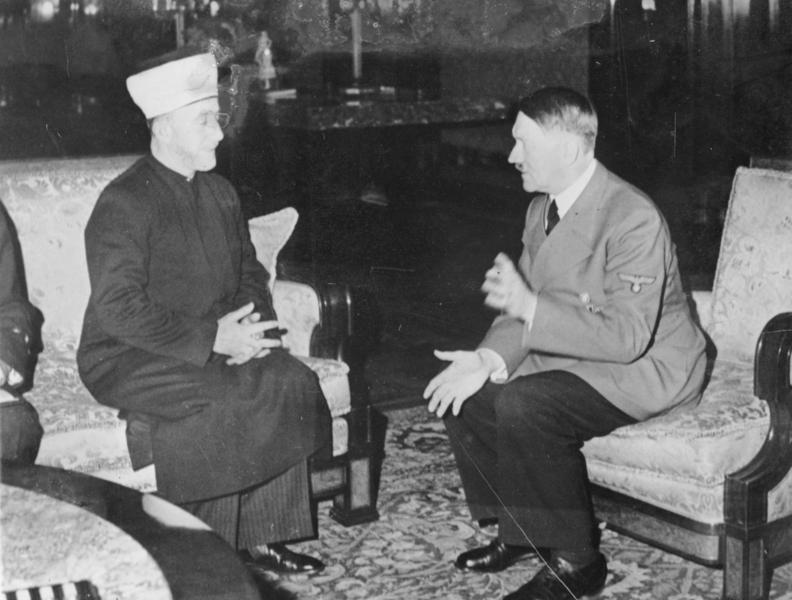
Haj Amin al-Husayni meeting with Adolf Hitler in December 1941

Both Yishuv soldiers and Palestinian Arab soldiers served in the Allied forces in WWII (in the Palestine Regiment).

In May 1941, amid the Anglo-Iraqi war, mufti of Jerusalem Amin al-Husayni, who was in exile in Iraq, issued a fatwa for a holy war against Britain. In 1941, during a meeting with Adolf Hitler, Amin al-Husayni asked Germany to oppose, as part of the Arab struggle for independence, the establishment of a Jewish national home in Palestine. He received a promise from Hitler that Germany would eliminate the existing Jewish foundations in Palestine after the Germans had gained victory in the war. During the war al-Husayni served as a propagandist for Germany, and took part in recruitment of Muslim soldiers of various ethnicities fighting on the side of Nazi Germany.

==== After World War II ====
After World War II, as a result of the British policies, the Jewish resistance organizations united and established the Jewish Resistance Movement which coordinated armed attacks against the British military which took place between 1945 and 1946. Following the King David Hotel bombing (in which the Irgun blew up the King David Hotel in Jerusalem, the headquarters of the British administration), which shocked the public because of the deaths of many innocent civilians, the Jewish Resistance Movement was disassembled in 1946. The leadership of the Yishuv decided instead to concentrate their efforts on the illegal immigration and began to organize a massive immigration of European Jewish refugees to Palestine using small boats operating in secrecy, many of which were captured at sea by the British and imprisoned in camps on Cyprus. About 70,000 Jews were brought to Palestine in this way in 1946 and 1947. Details of the Holocaust had a major effect on the situation in Palestine and propelled large support for the Zionist movement.

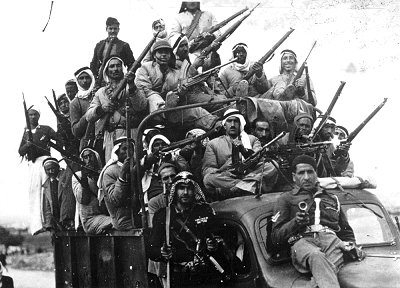
Palestinian Arab fighters, 1947

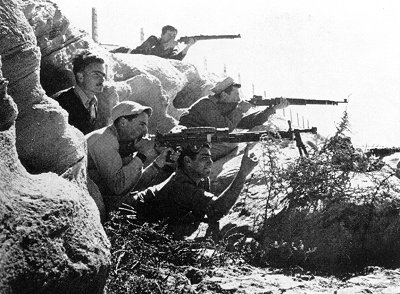
Haganah fighters, 1947

==== 1947 partition ====
On May 15, 1947, the General Assembly of the newly formed United Nations resolved that a committee, (United Nations Special Committee on Palestine), be created "to prepare for consideration at the next regular session of the Assembly a report on the question of Palestine". The Committee was to consist of the representatives of Australia, Canada, Czechoslovakia, Guatemala, India, Iran, Netherlands, Peru, Sweden, Uruguay and Yugoslavia.

In Chapter VI of the report of September 3, 1947, the majority of the Committee proposed recommendations for consideration by the General Assembly that "Palestine within its present borders, following a transitional period of two years from September 1, 1947, shall be constituted into an independent Arab State, an independent Jewish State, and the City of Jerusalem". The Arab state was supposed to comprise roughly 4,300 square miles (11,000 km^{2}) and would contain a tiny Jewish population. The Jewish State was supposed to be roughly 5,700 square miles (15,000 km^{2}) in size and was supposed to contain a sizable Arab minority population. Neither state would be contiguous. Jerusalem and Bethlehem were to be put under the control of the United Nations. Neither side was satisfied with the Partition Plan. The Jews disliked losing Jerusalem—which had a majority Jewish population at that time—and worried about the tenability of a noncontiguous state. However, most of the Jews in Palestine accepted the plan, and the Jewish Agency (the de facto government of the Yishuv) campaigned fervently for its approval. The more extreme Jewish groups, such as the Irgun, rejected the plan. The Arab leadership argued that it violated the rights of the majority of the people in Palestine, which at the time was 67% non-Jewish (1,237,000) and 33% Jewish (608,000). Arab leaders also argued a large number of Arabs would be trapped in the Jewish State. Every major Arab leader objected in principle to the right of the Jews to an independent state in Palestine, reflecting the policies of the Arab League.

On November 29, 1947, the General Assembly adopted a resolution recommending "to the United Kingdom, as the mandatory Power for Palestine, and to all other Members of the United Nations the adoption and implementation, with regard to the future government of Palestine, of the Plan of Partition with Economic Union", (a slightly amended version of the plan in Chapter VI of the report of September 3, 1947), as Resolution 181(II)). Thirty-three states voted in favor of the resolution, while 13 countries opposed it. Ten countries abstained from the vote. The Yishuv accepted the plan, but the Arabs in Palestine and the surrounding Arab states rejected the plan. The Arab countries (all of which had opposed the plan) proposed to query the International Court of Justice on the competence of the General Assembly to partition a country against the wishes of the majority of its inhabitants, but were again defeated.

The Plan (PART I A., Clause 3.) provided that "Independent Arab and Jewish States and the Special International Regime for the City of Jerusalem, should come into existence in Palestine two months after the evacuation of the armed forces of the mandatory Power has been completed but in any case not later than October 1, 1948 ...."

==== 1947–1948 war: Conflict between the Yishuv and Palestinian Arabs ====
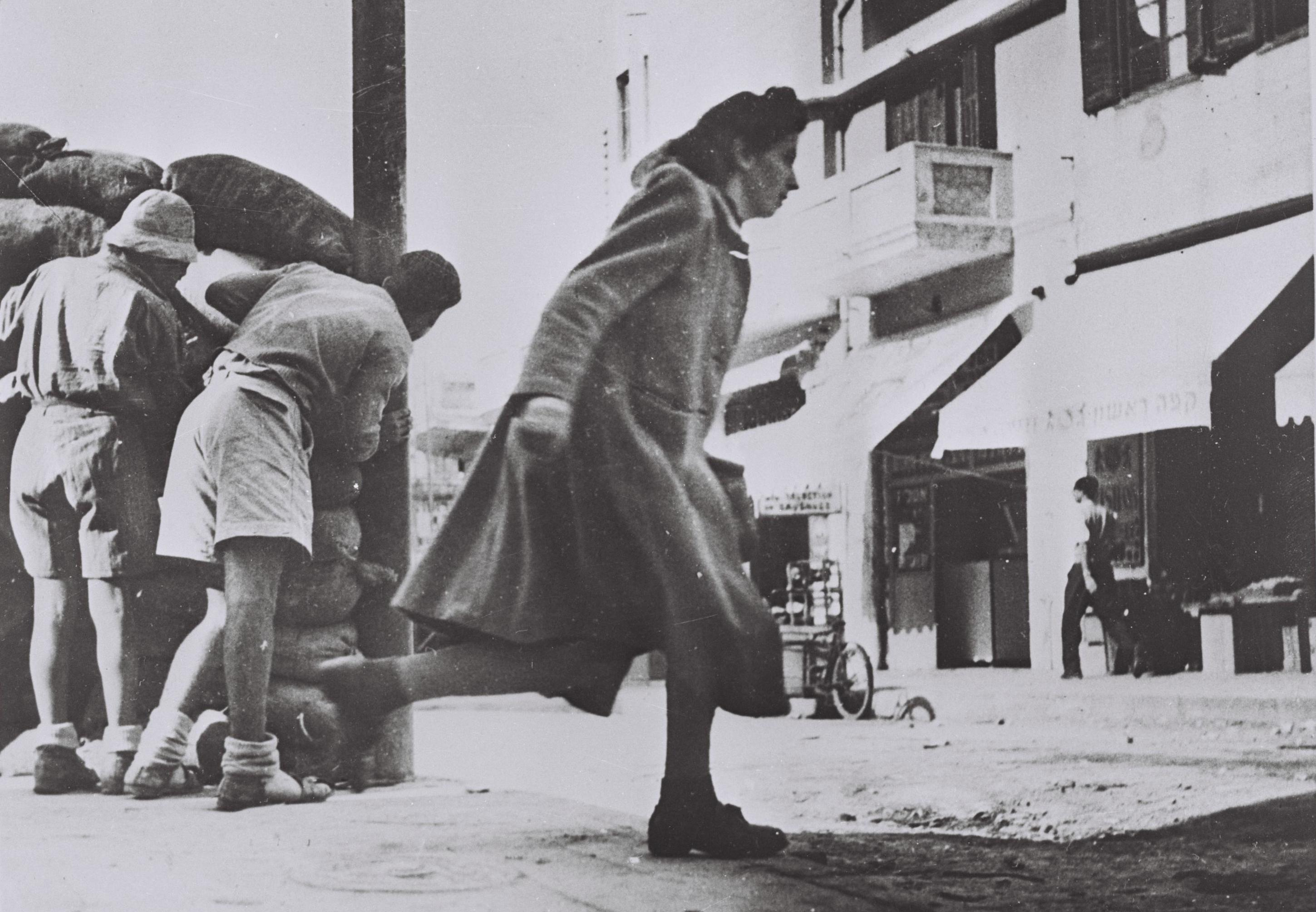
Tel Aviv civilians trying to hide from Arab snipers shooting at the Carmel market from Hassan Beck mosque on, 25 February 1948

The approval of the plan sparked attacks carried out by Arab irregulars against the Jewish population in Palestine. Fighting began almost as soon as the Resolution of November 29, 1947 was approved. Shooting, stoning, and rioting continued apace in the following days. The consulates of Poland and Sweden, both of whose governments had voted for partition, were attacked. Bombs were thrown into cafes, Molotov cocktails were hurled at shops, and a synagogue was set on fire. Arab gunmen attacked Jewish cars and trucks, snipers in Jaffa began firing at passers-by in Tel Aviv and Jaffa Arabs attacked close Tel Aviv neighborhood.

As the British evacuation from the region progressed, the violence became more prevalent. Murders, reprisals, and counter-reprisals came fast on each other's heels, resulting in dozens of victims killed on both sides in the process. The Deir Yassin massacre took place on April 9, 1948, when around 120 fighters from the Irgun Zevai Leumi and the Israeli Stern Gang Zionist paramilitary groups attacked Deir Yassin near Jerusalem, a Palestinian Arab village of roughly 600 people. The sanguinary impasse persisted as no force intervened to put a stop to the escalating cycles of violence. During the first two months of the war, about 1,000 people were killed and 2,000 injured. By the end of March, the figure had risen to 2,000 dead and 4,000 wounded.

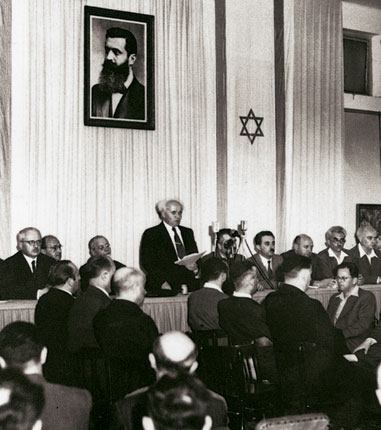
David Ben-Gurion publicly pronouncing the Declaration of the State of Israel, May 14, 1948

On May 14, 1948, one day before the British Mandate expired, Ben-Gurion declared "the establishment of a Jewish State in Eretz-Israel, to be known as the State of Israel". The declaration was stated to be "by virtue of our natural and historic right and on the strength of the resolution of the United Nations General Assembly". The Declaration stated that the State of Israel would "ensure complete equality of social and political rights to all its inhabitants irrespective of religion, race or sex; it will guarantee freedom of religion, conscience, language, education and culture; it will safeguard the Holy Places of all religions; and it will be faithful to the principles of the Charter of the United Nations".

== The conflict ==
=== 1948–1949 war: Israel and the Arab states ===
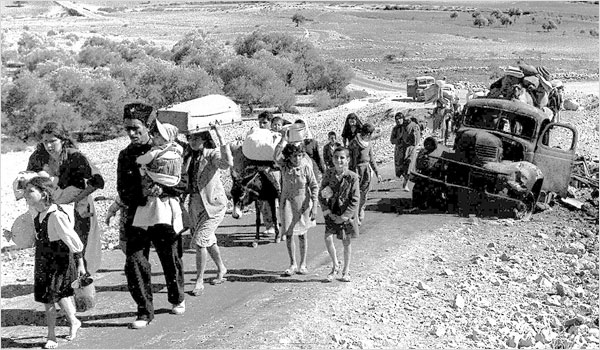
Palestinian refugees in 1948

The termination of the British mandate over Palestine and the Israeli Declaration of Independence sparked a full-scale war (1948 Arab–Israeli War) which erupted after May 14, 1948. On 15–16 May, the four armies of Jordan, Syria, Egypt and Iraq invaded/intervened in what had been the area of the British Mandate followed not long after by units from Lebanon.

In the introduction to the cablegram from the Secretary-General of the League of Arab States to the UN Secretary-General on May 15, 1948, the Arab League gave reasons for its "intervention", "On the occasion of the intervention of Arab States in Palestine to restore law and order and to prevent disturbances prevailing in Palestine from spreading into their territories and to check further bloodshed". Clause 10.(a) of the Cablegram provided:

"10. Now that the Mandate over Palestine has come to an end, leaving no legally constituted authority behind in order to administer law and order in the country and afford the necessary and adequate protection to life and property, the Arab States declare as follows:
"(a) The right to set up a Government in Palestine pertains to its inhabitants under the principles of self-determination recognized by the Covenant of the League of Nations as well as the United Nations Charter".

United Nations Partition Plan for Palestine 1947

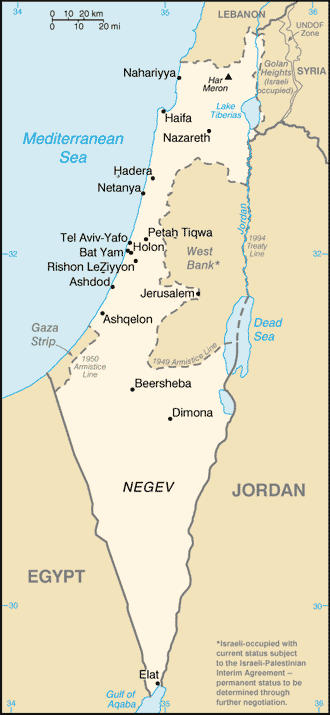
The 1949 Green Line borders

While Arab commanders ordered villagers to evacuate for military purposes in isolated areas, there is no evidence that the Arab leadership made a blanket call for evacuation and in fact most urged Palestinians to stay in their homes. Assaults by the Haganah on major Arab population centers like Jaffa and Haifa as well as expulsions carried out by groups like the Irgun and Lehi such as at Deir Yassin and Lydda led to the exodus of large portions of the Arab masses. Factors such as the earlier flight by the Palestinian elite and the psychological effects of Jewish atrocities (stories which both sides propagated) also played important roles in the Palestinian flight.

The war resulted in an Israeli victory, with Israel annexing territory beyond the partition borders for a proposed Jewish state and into the borders for a proposed Palestinian Arab state. Jordan, Syria, Lebanon, and Egypt signed the 1949 Armistice Agreements with Israel. The remaining territories, the Gaza Strip and the West Bank, were occupied by Egypt and Transjordan, respectively. Jordan also annexed East Jerusalem while Israel administered West Jerusalem. In 1950, the West Bank was unilaterally incorporated into Jordan.

=== Refugees ===
Between 700,000 and 750,000 Palestinian Arabs fled or were expelled from the area that became Israel and became what is known today as the Palestinian refugees. The Palestinian refugees were not allowed to return to Israel and most of the neighboring Arab states, with the exception of Transjordan, denied granting them—or their descendants—citizenship. In 1949, Israel offered to allow some members of families that had been separated during the war to return, to release refugee accounts frozen in Israeli banks, and to repatriate 100,000 refugees. The Arab states rejected this compromise, at least in part because they were unwilling to take any action that might be construed as recognition of Israel. As of today, most of them still live in refugee camps and the question of how their situation should be resolved remains one of the main issues of the Israeli–Palestinian conflict.

Due to the 1948 Arab–Israeli war, about 856,000 Jews fled or were expelled from their homes in Arab countries and most were forced to abandon their property. Jews from Libya, Iraq, Yemen, Syria, Lebanon and North Africa left due to physical and political insecurity, with the majority being forced to abandon their properties. 260,000 reached Israel in 1948–1951, 600,000 by 1972.

While most of the Palestinian Arab population that remained in Israel after the war was granted an Israeli citizenship, Arab Israelis were subject to martial law up to 1966. A variety of legal measures facilitated the transfer of land abandoned by Arabs to state ownership. In 1966, security restrictions placed on Arab citizens of Israel were lifted completely, the government set about dismantling most of the discriminatory laws, and Arab citizens of Israel were granted the same rights as Jewish citizens.

After the 1948 war, some of the Palestinian refugees who lived in camps in the West Bank within Jordanian controlled territory, the Gaza Strip Egyptian controlled territory and Syria tried to return by infiltration into Israeli territory, and some of those Palestinians who had remained in Israel were declared infiltrators by Israel and were deported. Ben-Gurion emphatically rejected the return of refugees in the Israeli Cabinet decision of June 1948 reiterated in a letter to the UN of August 2, 1949 containing the text of a statement made by Moshe Sharett on August 1, 1948 where the basic attitude of the Israeli Government was that a solution must be sought, not through the return of the refugees to Israel, but through the resettlement of the Palestinian Arab refugee population in other states.

=== 1950–1967: Six-Day War ===
Violence was ongoing during almost the entire period from 1950 through 1967. It includes attacks on civilians in Israel carried out by the Jordanian Army, such as the Ramat Rachel archaeologists shooting attack, mass-casualty attacks on Israeli civilians carried out by Palestinian militants then usually called fedayeen, include the Yehud attack, the Ma'ale Akrabim massacre, the Beit Oved attack, the Shafir shooting attack, the 1956 Eilat bus ambush, the Ein Ofarim killings, and the Negev desert road ambush; major Israeli attacks include the Beit Jalla, the Qibya massacre, the Nahalin reprisal raid, and the Rantis and Falameh reprisal raids. The Lavon Affair led to a deeper distrust of Jews in Egypt, from whose community key agents in the operation had been recruited, and as a result Egypt retaliated against its Jewish community. After Israel's raid on an Egyptian military outpost in Gaza in February 1955 killed 37 Egyptian soldiers the Egyptian government began to actively sponsor, train, and arm the Palestinian volunteers from Gaza as fedayeen units which committed raids into Israel.

In 1967, after years of Egyptian-aided Palestinian fedayeen attacks stemming from the Gaza Strip, the Egyptian expulsion of UNEF, Egypt's amassing of an increased number of troops in the Sinai Peninsula, and several other threatening gestures from other neighboring Arab nations, Israel launched a strike against Egypt that they described as a preemptive move to prevent an anticipated invasion by Egypt. The strike and the operations that followed became known as the Six-Day War. At the end of the Six-Day War, Israel had captured, among other territories, the Gaza Strip from Egypt and the West Bank from Jordan (including East Jerusalem). Shortly after Israel seized control over Jerusalem, Israel asserted sovereignty over the entire city of Jerusalem and the Palestinian residents of East Jerusalem were given a permanent resident status in Israel. The status of the city as Israel's capital and the occupation of the West Bank and Gaza Strip created a new set of contentious issues in the conflict. This meant that Israel controlled the entire former British mandate of Palestine that under the Balfour Declaration was supposed to allow a Jewish state within its borders. Following the Six-Day War, the United Nations Security Council issued a resolution with a clause affirming "the necessity ... for achieving a just settlement of the refugee problem," referring to the Palestinian refugee problem.

At the end of August 1967, Arab leaders met in Khartoum in response to the war, to discuss the Arab position toward Israel. They reached consensus that there should be no recognition, no peace, and no negotiations with the State of Israel, the so-called "three no's".

Following years of attacks by the Palestinian fedayeen, the Palestine Liberation Organization (PLO) was established in 1964. Its goal was the liberation of Palestine through armed struggle. The original PLO Charter stated the desire for a Palestinian state established within the entirety of the borders of the British mandate prior to the 1948 war (i.e. the current boundaries of the State of Israel) and said it is a "national duty ... to purge the Zionist presence from Palestine." It also called for a right of return and self-determination for Palestinians.

=== 1967–93 ===
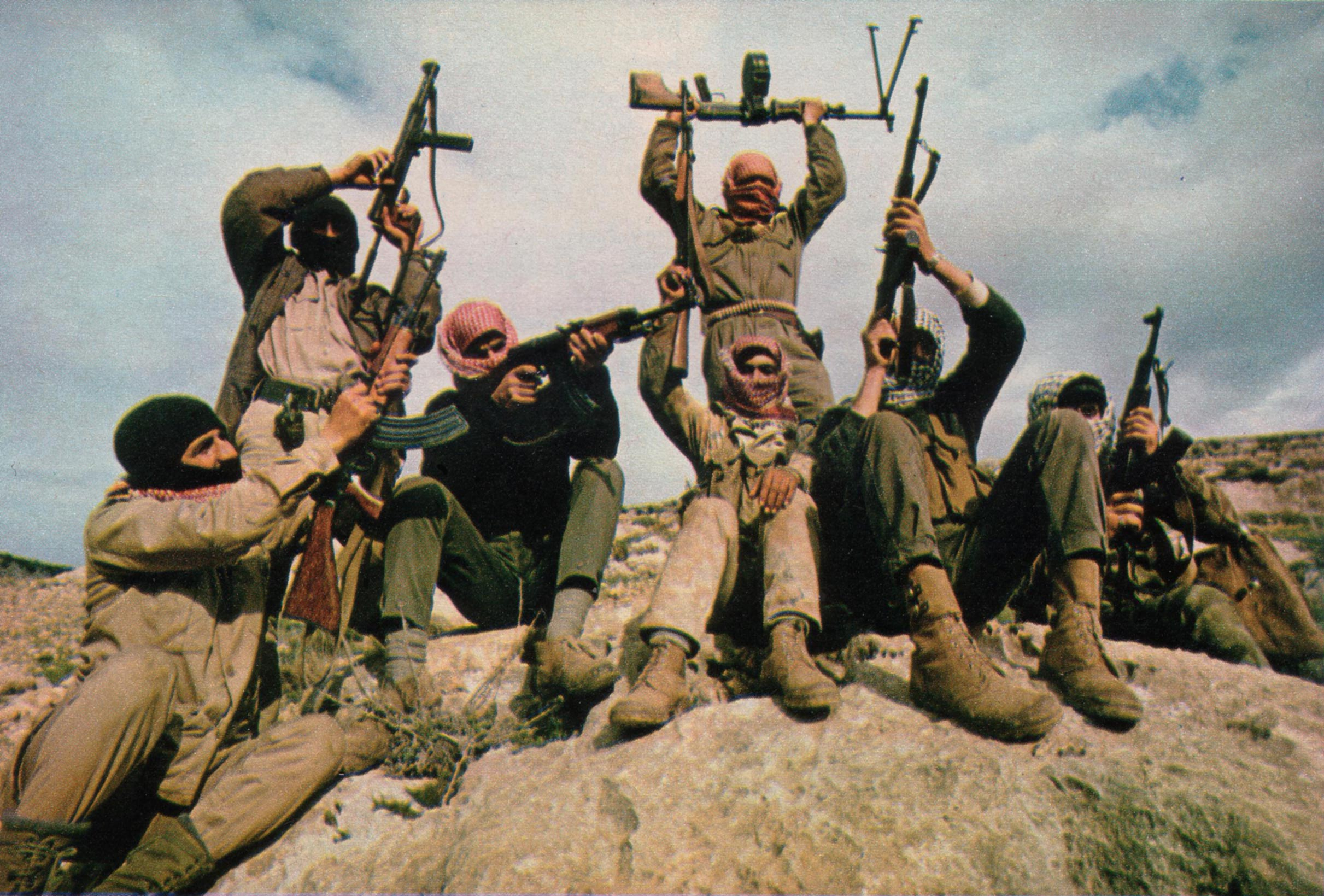
Palestinian fedayeen militants in Jordan belonging to the PFLP, 1969

The defeat of the Arab countries in the Six-Day War prompted fractured Palestinian political and militant groups to give up any remaining hope they had placed in pan-Arabism. In July 1968 armed, non-state actors such as Fatah and the Popular Front for the Liberation of Palestine achieved the majority of the Palestinian National Council votes, and on February 3, 1969, at the Palestinian National Council in Cairo, the leader of the Fatah, Yasser Arafat was elected as the chairman of the PLO. From the start, the organization used armed violence against civilian and military targets in the conflict with Israel. The PLO tried to take over the population of the West Bank, but the Israel Defense Forces (IDF) deported them into Jordan, where they began to act against the Jordanian rule (Palestinians in Jordan comprised about 70% of the total population, which mostly consisted of refugees) and from there attacked Israel numerous times, using the infiltration of terrorists and shooting Katyusha rockets. This led to retaliations from Israel.

In the late 1960s, tensions between Palestinians and the Jordanian government increased greatly. In September 1970 a bloody military struggle was held between Jordan and the Palestinian armed organizations. King Hussein of Jordan was able to quell the Palestinian revolt. During the armed conflict, thousands of people were killed, the vast majority of whom were Palestinians. The fighting continued until July 1971 with the expulsion of the PLO to Lebanon. A large number of Palestinians immigrated to Lebanon after Black September and joined the tens of thousands of Palestinian refugees already there. The center of PLO activity then shifted to Lebanon, where they established bases to stage attacks on Israel and launch an international terror campaign, largely aimed at abducting airplanes. The 1969 Cairo agreement gave the Palestinians autonomy within the south of the country, increasing the Palestinian control of the area. The area controlled by the PLO became known by the international press and locals as "Fatahland", which created tensions with local Lebanese and contributed to the 1975–1990 Lebanese Civil War.

The PLO took advantage of its control of southern Lebanon in order to launch Katyusha rocket attacks at Galilee villages and execute terror attacks on the northern border. At the beginning of the 1970s the Palestinian terror organizations, headed by the PLO and the Popular Front for the Liberation of Palestine waged an international terror campaign against Israelis, primarily in Europe. In an attempt to publicize the Palestinian cause, frustrated Palestinian guerrilla groups in Lebanon attacked Israeli civilian 'targets' like schools, buses and apartment blocks, with occasional attacks abroad—for example, at embassies or airports—and with the hijacking of airliners. The peak of the Palestinian terrorism wave against Israelis occurred in 1972 and took form in several acts of terrorism, most prominently the Sabena Flight 572 hijacking, the Lod Airport massacre and the Munich massacre.

On March 15, 1972 King Hussein of Jordan unveiled his plan for a "United Arab Kingdom", which would have been a federation consisting of the Hashemite Kingdom of Jordan and a federal district in the West Bank which was formerly under Jordan's control. According to King Hussein's proposal each state would have its own parliament and would be united under one monarch. Hussein conditioned the establishment of the UAK on a treaty between Jordan and Israel in which Israel would concede the control of East Jerusalem to the Jordanian-Palestinian federation so that it would become the capital of the Palestinian Arab federal district. The plan was eventually ruled out after the PLO and other Arab states strongly opposed the plan and after Israel rejected the notion of transferring the control of East Jerusalem to such a federation.

The 1972 also saw increasing Soviet involvement. Defector Ion Mihai Pacepa claimed that the KGB and Securitate organized trainings on covert bombing and plane hijacking for PLO and published propaganda (such as The Protocols of the Elders of Zion) in Arabic language to further fuel the conflict.

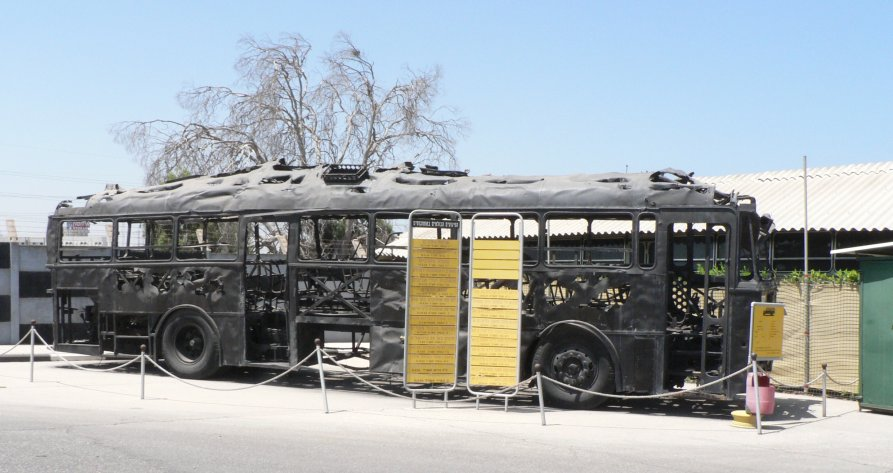
Coastal Road massacre: The charred remains of the hijacked Egged coach, at the Egged museum in Holon. 38 Israeli civilians were killed in this PLO attack.

The Munich massacre was perpetrated during the 1972 Summer Olympics in Munich. 11 members of the Israeli team were taken hostage by Palestinian terrorists. A botched German rescue attempt led to the death of all 11 Israeli athletes and coaches. Five of the terrorists were shot and three survived unharmed. The three surviving Palestinians were released without charge by the German authorities a month later. The Israeli government responded with an assassination campaign against the organizers and a raid on the PLO headquarters in Lebanon. Other notable events include the hijacking of several civilian airliners, the Savoy Hotel attack, the Zion Square explosive refrigerator and the Coastal Road massacre. During the 1970s and the early 1980s, Israel suffered attacks from PLO bases in Lebanon, such as the Avivim school bus massacre in 1970 and the Ma'alot massacre in 1974 in which Palestinians attacked a school in Ma'alot killing twenty-two children.

In 1973 The Syrian and Egyptian armies launched the Yom Kippur War, a well-planned surprise attack against Israel. The Egyptians and Syrians advanced during the first 24–48 hours, after which momentum began to swing in Israel's favor. Eventually a Disengagement of Forces agreement was signed between the parties and a ceasefire took effect that ended the war. The Yom Kippur War paved the way for the Camp David Accords in 1978, which set a precedent for future peace negotiations.

In 1974 the PLO adopted the Ten Point Program, which called for the establishment of a national authority "over every part of Palestinian territory that is liberated" with the aim of "completing the liberation of all Palestinian territory". The program implied that the liberation of Palestine may be partial (at least, at some stage), and though it emphasized armed struggle, it did not exclude other means. This allowed the PLO to engage in diplomatic channels, and provided validation for future compromises made by the Palestinian leadership.

In the mid-1970s many attempts were made by Gush Emunim movement to establish outposts or resettle former Jewish areas in the West Bank and Gaza Strip. Initially the Israeli government forcibly disbanded these settlements. However, in the absence of peace talks to determine the future of these and other occupied territories, Israel ceased enforcement of the original ban on settlement, which led to the founding of the first settlements in these regions.

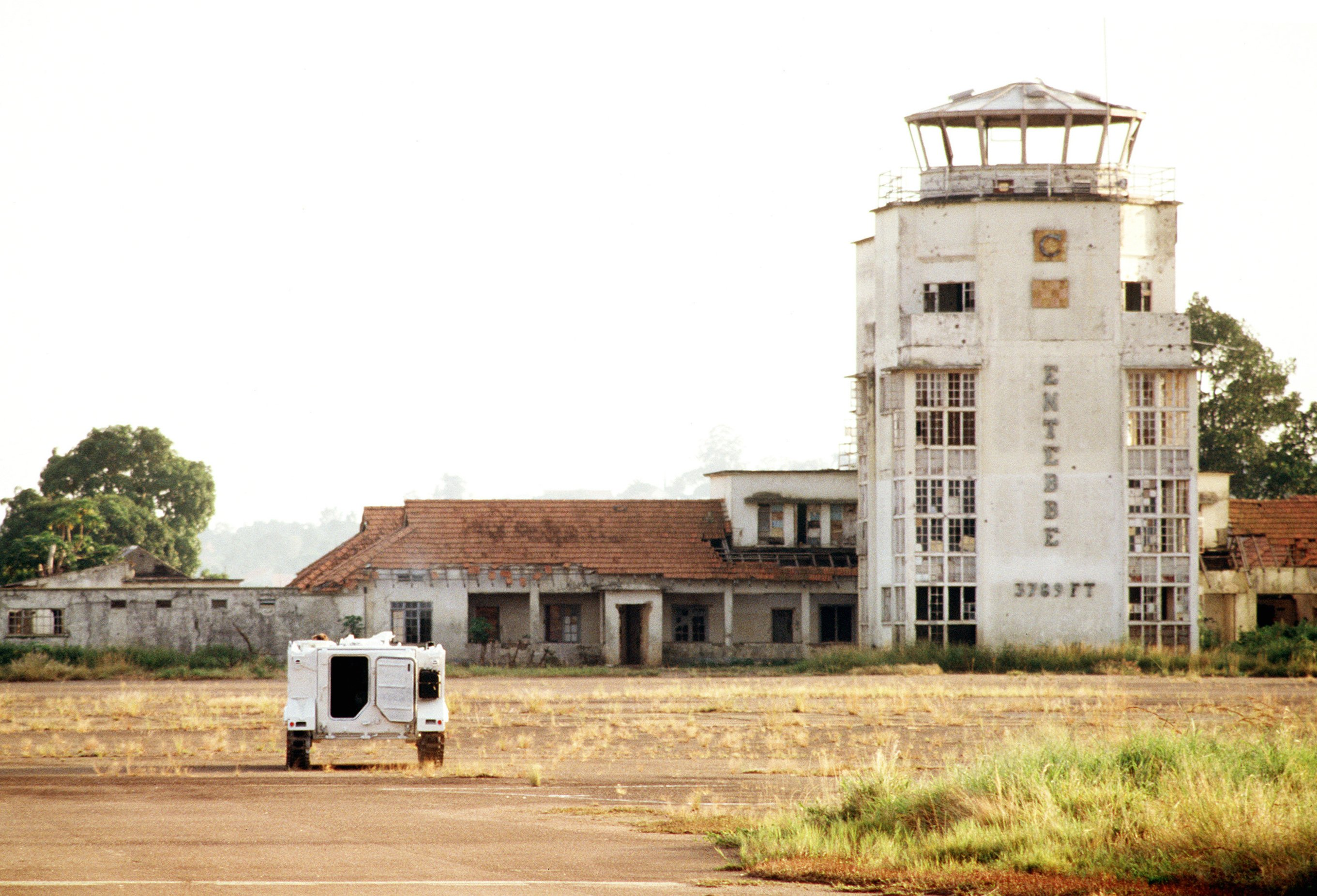
The site of Operation Entebbe

In July 1976, an Air France plane carrying 260 people was hijacked by Palestinian and German terrorists and flown to Uganda. There, the Germans separated the Jewish passengers from the Non-Jewish passengers, releasing the non-Jews. The hijackers threatened to kill the remaining 100-odd Jewish passengers (and the French crew who had refused to leave). Israel responded with a rescue operation in which the kidnapped Jews were freed.

The rise of the Likud party to the government in 1977 led to the establishment of a large number of Israeli settlements in the West Bank.

On March 11, 1978, a force of nearly a dozen armed Palestinian terrorists landed their boats near a major coastal road in Israel. There they hijacked a bus and sprayed gunfire inside and at passing vehicles, killing thirty-seven civilians. In response, the IDF launched Operation Litani three days later, with the goal of taking control of Southern Lebanon up to the Litani River. The IDF achieved this goal, and the PLO withdrew to the north into Beirut. After Israel withdrew from Lebanon, Fatah forces resumed firing rockets into the Galilee region of Israel. During the years following operation Litani, many diplomatic efforts were made which tried to end the war on the Israeli–Lebanese border, including the effort of Philip Habib, the emissary of Ronald Reagan who in the summer of 1981 managed to arrange a lasting cease-fire between Israel and the PLO which lasted about a year.

Israel ended the ceasefire after an assassination attempt on the Israeli Ambassador in Britain, Shlomo Argov, in mid-1982 (which was made by Abu Nidal's organization that was ostracized from the PLO). This led Israel to invade Lebanon in the 1982 Lebanon War on June 6, 1982 with the aim to protect the North of Israel from terrorist attacks. IDF invaded Lebanon and even occupied Beirut. To end the siege, the US and European governments brokered an agreement guaranteeing safe passage for Arafat and Fatah—guarded by a multinational force—to exile in Tunis. During the war, Israeli allied Phalangist Christian Arab militias carried out the bloody Sabra and Shatila Massacre in which 700–3,500 unarmed Palestinians were killed by the Phalangist militias while the Israeli troops surrounded the camps with tanks and checkpoints, monitoring entrances and exits. For its involvement in the Lebanese war and its indirect responsibility for the Sabra and Shatila Massacre, Israel was heavily criticized, including from within. An Israeli Commission of Inquiry found that Israeli military personnel, among them defense minister and future prime minister Ariel Sharon, had several times become aware that a massacre was in progress without taking serious steps to stop it, leading to his resignation as Israel's Defense Minister. In June 1985, Israel withdrew most of its troops from Lebanon, leaving a residual Israeli force and an Israeli-supported militia in southern Lebanon as a "security zone" and buffer against attacks on its northern territory.

Meanwhile, the PLO led an international diplomatic front against Israel in Tunis. Following the wave of terror attacks including the murder on MS Achille Lauro in October 1985, Israel bombed the PLO commandership in Tunis during Operation Wooden Leg.

According to information obtained from the Israeli Department of Defense, Israel revoked the residency status of more than 100,000 residents of the Gaza Strip and of around 140,000 residents of the West Bank during the 27 years between Israel's occupation of the West Bank and Gaza Strip in 1967 and the establishment of the Palestinian Authority in 1994. Working in secret, the Israeli government revoked the residency status of Palestinians who studied or lived abroad for longer than a period of time and the revocations have barred nearly a quarter of a million Palestinians and their descendants from returning to Israel/Palestine. Israel is now employing a similar residency right revocation procedure for Palestinian residents of East Jerusalem.

The first Palestinian Intifada (uprising) erupted in December 1987 and lasted until the Madrid Conference of 1991, despite Israeli attempts to suppress it. It was a partially spontaneous uprising, but by January 1988, it was already under the direction from the PLO headquarters in Tunis, which carried out ongoing terrorist attacks targeting Israeli civilians. The riots escalated daily throughout the territories and were especially severe in the Gaza Strip. The Intifada was renowned for its stone-throwing demonstrations by youth against the heavily armed Israeli Defense Forces. Over the course of the First Intifada, a total 1,551 Palestinians and 422 Israelis were killed. In 1987, Ahmed Yassin co-founded Hamas with Abdel Aziz al-Rantissi. Since then, Hamas has been involved in what it calls "armed resistance" against Israel, which includes mainly terrorist acts against Israeli civilian population.

On November 15, 1988, a year after the outbreak of the first intifada, the PLO declared the establishment of the Palestinian state from Algiers, Algeria. The proclaimed "State of Palestine" is not and has never actually been an independent state, as it has never had sovereignty over any territory in history. The declaration is generally interpreted to have recognized Israel within its pre-1967 boundaries, and its right to exist. Following this declaration, the United States and many other countries recognized the PLO.

During the Gulf War in 1990–91, Arafat supported Saddam Hussein's invasion of Kuwait and opposed the US-led coalition attack on Iraq. After the Gulf War, Kuwaiti authorities forcibly pressured nearly 200,000 Palestinians to leave Kuwait. The policy which partly led to this exodus was a response to the alignment of PLO leader Yasser Arafat with Saddam Hussein. Arafat's decision also severed relations with Egypt and many of the oil-producing Arab states that supported the US-led coalition. Many in the US also used Arafat's position as a reason to disregard his claims to being a partner for peace. After the end of hostilities, many Arab states that backed the coalition cut off funds to the PLO which brought the PLO to the brink of crisis.

In the aftermath of the 1991 Gulf War, the coalition's victory in the Gulf War opened a new opportunity to advance the peace process. The U.S launched a diplomatic initiative in cooperation with Russia which resulted in the October 1991 Madrid peace conference. The conference was hosted by the government of Spain and co-sponsored by the US and the USSR. The Madrid peace conference was an early attempt by the international community to start a peace process through negotiations involving Israel and the Palestinians, as well as Arab countries including Syria, Lebanon, and Jordan. The Palestinian team due to Israeli objections, was initially formally a part of a joint Palestinian-Jordanian delegation and consisted of Palestinians from the West Bank and Gaza without open PLO associations.

=== 1993–2000: Oslo peace process ===
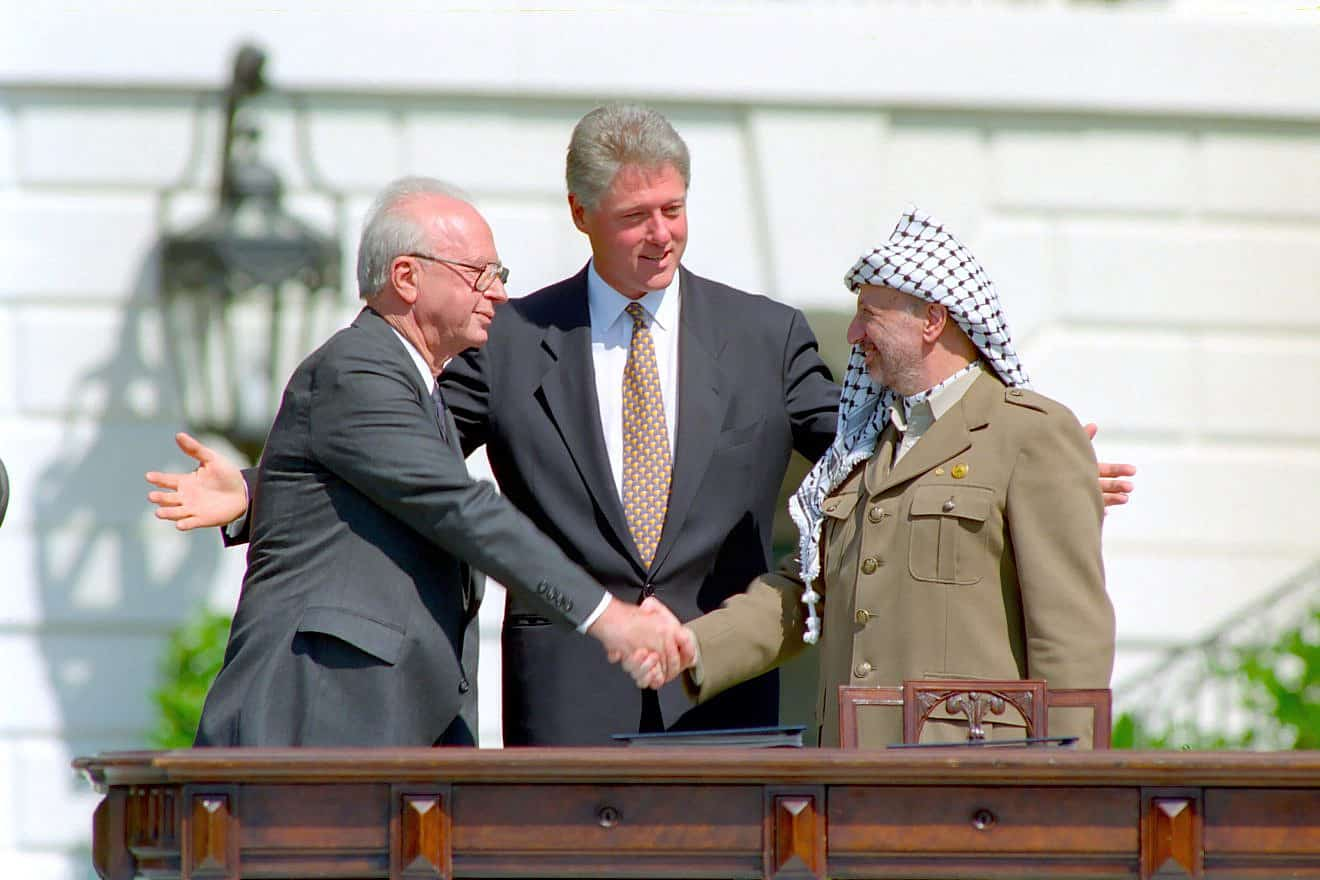
Yitzhak Rabin, Bill Clinton, and Yasser Arafat during the Oslo Accords on September 13, 1993

In January 1993, Israeli and Palestine Liberation Organization (PLO) negotiators began secret negotiations in Oslo, Norway. On September 9, 1993, Yasser Arafat sent a letter to Israeli Prime Minister Yitzhak Rabin, stating that the PLO officially recognized Israel's right to exist and officially renouncing terrorism. On September 13, Arafat and Rabin signed a Declaration of Principles in Washington, D.C., on the basis of the negotiations between Israeli and Palestinian teams in Oslo, Norway. The declaration was a major conceptual breakthrough achieved outside of the Madrid framework, which specifically barred foreign-residing PLO leaders from the negotiation process. After this, a long process of negotiation known as the "Oslo peace process" began. One of the main features of the Oslo Peace Process was the establishment of the autonomous governmental authority, the Palestinian Authority and its associated governing institutions to administer Palestinian communities in the Gaza Strip and the West Bank.

In February 1994, Baruch Goldstein, a follower of the Kach party, murdered 29 Palestinians and wounded 125 at the Cave of the Patriarchs in Hebron, which became known as the Cave of the Patriarchs massacre. In an act of revenge for the massacre, in April 1994, Hamas launched suicide attacks targeting the Israeli civilian population in many locations throughout Israel, and it has since become one of the regular methods Hamas uses to attack Israel.

On September 28, 1995, Prime Minister Yitzhak Rabin and PLO chairman Yasser Arafat signed an interim agreement on the West Bank and the Gaza Strip in Washington. The agreement marked the conclusion of the first stage of negotiations between Israel and the PLO. The agreement allowed the PLO leadership to relocate to the occupied territories and granted autonomy to the Palestinians with talks to follow regarding final status. In return, the Palestinians recognized Israel's right to exist and promised to abstain from the use of terror.

Tensions in Israel, arising from the continuation of terrorism and anger at the loss of territory, led to the assassination of Rabin by Yigal Amir, a right-wing Jewish extremist, on November 4, 1995. Upon Rabin's assassination, the Israeli prime minister's post was filled by Shimon Peres. Peres continued Rabin's policies in supporting the peace process.

In 1996, increasing Israeli doubts about the peace process led to Benjamin Netanyahu of the Likud Party winning the election, mainly due to his promise to use a more rigid line in the negotiations with the Palestinian Authority. Netanyahu raised many questions about many central premises of the Oslo process. One of his main points was disagreement with the Oslo premise that the negotiations should proceed in stages, meaning that concessions should be made to Palestinians before any resolution was reached on major issues, such as the status of Jerusalem, and the amending of the Palestinian National Charter. Oslo supporters had claimed that the multi-stage approach would build goodwill among Palestinians and would propel them to seek reconciliation when these major issues were raised in later stages. Netanyahu said that these concessions only gave encouragement to extremist elements, without receiving any tangible gestures in return. He called for tangible gestures of Palestinian goodwill in return for Israeli concessions.

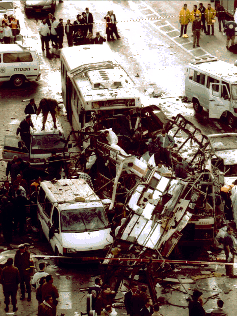
Aftermath of the Jaffa Road bus bombings. 26 people were killed in the Hamas suicide attack.

In January 1996, Israel assassinated the chief bombmaker of Hamas, Yahya Ayyash. In reaction to this, Hamas carried out a wave of suicide attacks in Israel. Following these attacks, the Palestinian Authority began to act against the Hamas and oppress their activity.

In January 1997, Netanyahu signed the Hebron Protocol with the Palestinian Authority, resulting in the redeployment of Israeli forces in Hebron and the turnover of civilian authority in much of the area to the Palestinian Authority.

In 1997, after two deadly suicide attacks in Jerusalem by Hamas, Israeli secret agents were sent to Jordan to eliminate the political head of the Department of Hamas, Khaled Mashal, using a special poison. The operation failed and the secret agents were captured. In return for their release Israel sent over the medicine which saved his life and freed a dozen Palestinian prisoners including Sheikh Ahmad Yassin. This release and the increase of the security forces of the Palestinian Authority led to a cease-fire in the suicide attacks until the outbreak of the Second Intifada.

The lack of progress in the peace process led to new negotiations, which produced the Wye River Memorandum, which detailed the steps to be taken by the Israeli government and Palestinian Authority to implement the earlier Interim Agreement of 1995. It was signed by Israeli Prime Minister Benjamin Netanyahu and PLO chairman Yasser Arafat, and on November 17, 1998, Israel's 120 member parliament, the Knesset, approved the Wye River Memorandum by a vote of 75–19.

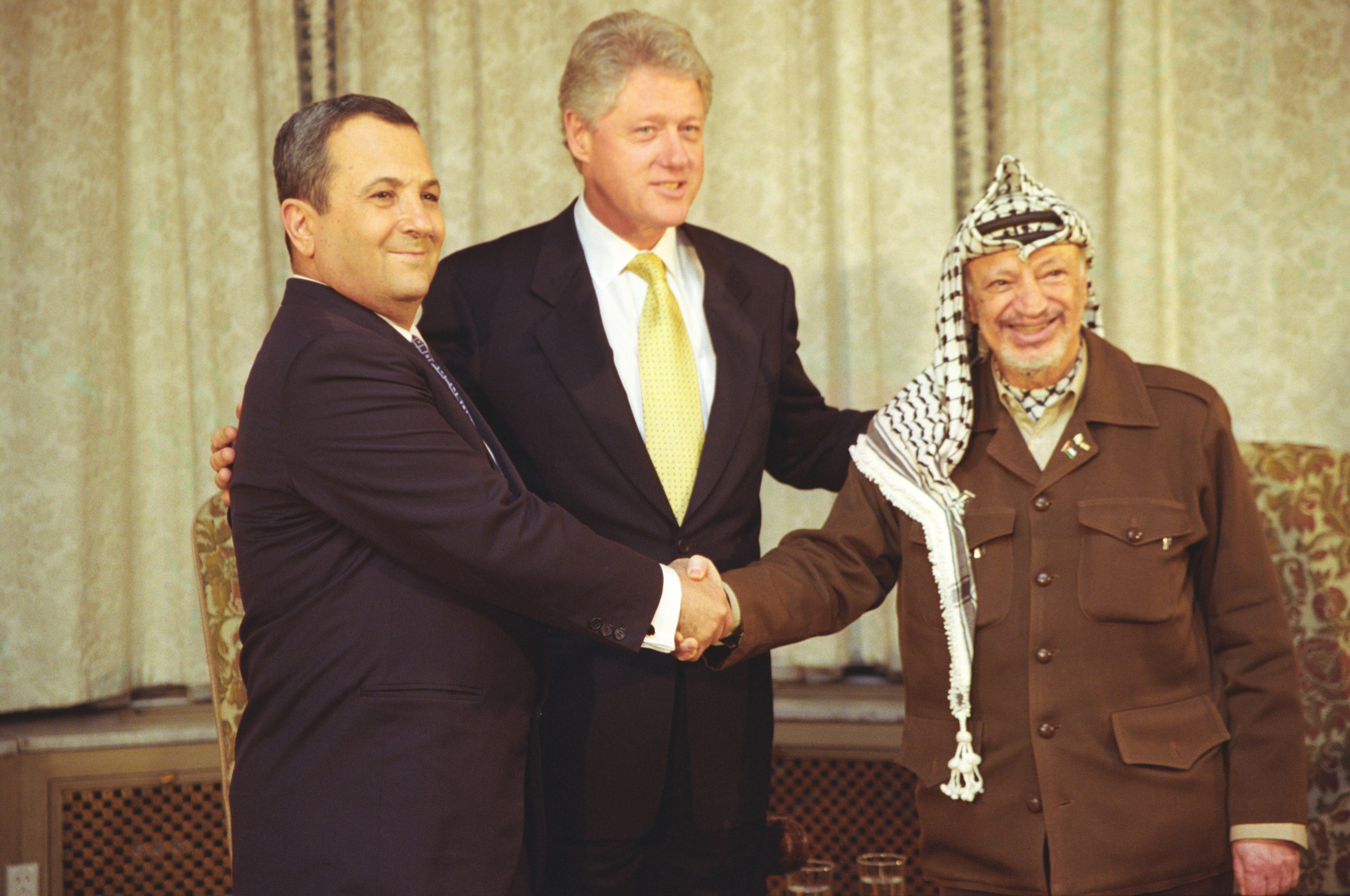
Ehud Barak, Bill Clinton, and Yasser Arafat during the 2000 Camp David Summit

In 1999, Ehud Barak was elected prime minister. Barak continued Rabin's policies in supporting the peace process. In 2000, 18 years after Israel occupied Southern Lebanon in the 1982 Lebanon War, the occupation ended as Israel unilaterally withdrew its remaining forces from the "security zone" in southern Lebanon.

As the violence increased with little hope for diplomacy, in July 2000 the Camp David 2000 Summit was held which was aimed at reaching a "final status" agreement. The summit collapsed after Yasser Arafat would not accept a proposal drafted by American and Israeli negotiators. Barak was prepared to offer the entire Gaza Strip, a Palestinian capital in a part of East Jerusalem, 73% of the West Bank (excluding eastern Jerusalem) raising to 90–94% after 10–25 years, and financial reparations for Palestinian refugees for peace. Arafat turned down the offer without making a counter-offer.

=== 2000–2005: Second Intifada ===
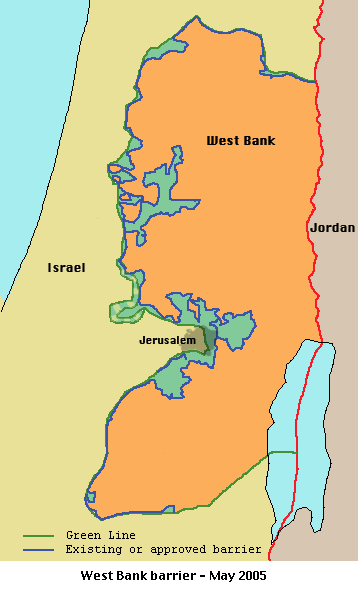
The approved West Bank barrier route as of May 2005

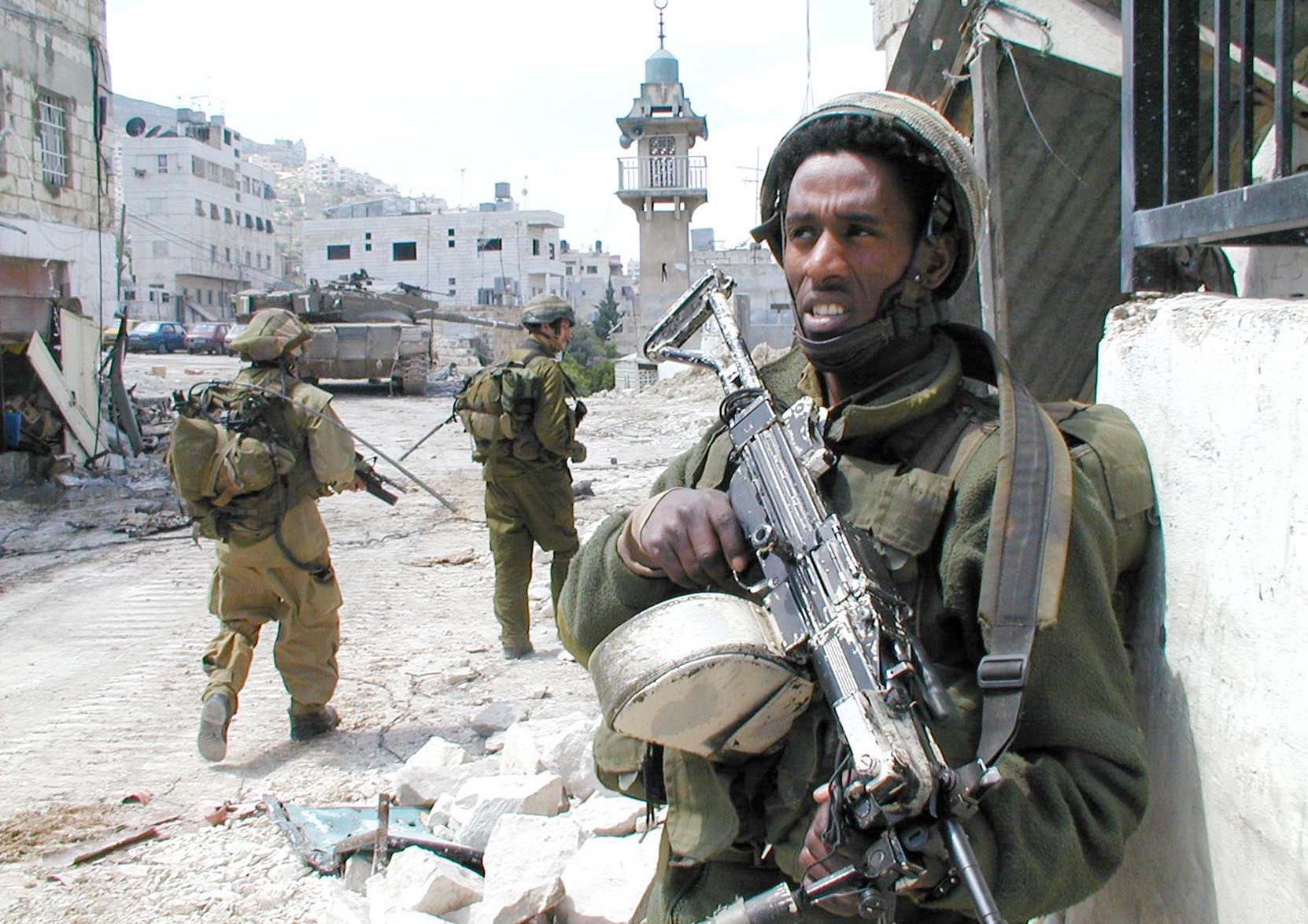
Israeli soldiers deployed in Nablus during Operation Defensive Shield, April 2002

After the failure of the 2000 Camp David Summit, which was expected to reach a final agreement on the Israeli–Palestinian peace process in July 2000, the Second Intifada, a major Palestinian uprising against Israel, erupted. The outbreaks of violence began in September 2000, after Ariel Sharon, then the Israeli opposition leader, made a provocative visit to the Al-Aqsa compound on the Temple Mount in Jerusalem.

After the collapse of Barak's government, Ariel Sharon was elected Prime Minister on February 6, 2001. Sharon invited the Israeli Labor Party into the coalition to shore up support for the disengagement plan. Due to the deterioration of the political situation, he refused to continue negotiations with the Palestinian Authority at the Taba Summit, or under any aspect of the Oslo Accords.

At the Beirut Summit in 2002, the Arab League proposed an alternative political plan aimed at ending the Israeli–Palestinian conflict. Later on the proposal was formulated as a political plan widely accepted by all Arab states as well as the Arab League. As part of this plan all Arab states would normalize their relations with Israel and bring to an end to the Arab–Israeli conflict in exchange for a full Israeli withdrawal from the Golan Heights, the Gaza Strip and West Bank (including East Jerusalem). In addition, the plan required Israel to allow the establishment of an independent Palestinian state and, what the plan describes as a "just solution" for the Palestinian refugees in accordance with UN General Assembly Resolution 194. Israel rejected the wording of the initiative, but official spokespersons expressed gladness about an Arab initiative for peace and Israel's normalization in the region.

Following a period of relative restraint on the part of Israel, after a lethal suicide attack in the Park Hotel in Netanya which happened on March 27, 2002, in which 30 Jews were murdered, Sharon ordered Operation Defensive Shield, a large-scale military operation carried out by the Israel Defense Forces between March 29 until May 10, 2002 in Palestinian cities in the West Bank. The operation contributed significantly to the reduction of Palestinian terror attacks in Israel.

As part of the efforts to fight Palestinian terrorism, in June 2002, Israel began construction of the West Bank barrier. After the barrier went up, Palestinian suicide bombings and other attacks across Israel dropped by 90%. However, this barrier became a major issue of contention between the two sides as 85% of the wall is within territory that is Palestinian according to the 1948 Green Line.

Following the severe economic and security situation in Israel, the Likud Party headed by Ariel Sharon won the Israeli elections in January 2003 in an overwhelming victory. The elections led to a temporary truce between Israel and the Palestinians and to the Aquba summit in the May 2003 in which Sharon endorsed the Road map for peace put forth by the United States, European Union, and Russia, which opened a dialogue with Mahmoud Abbas, and announced his commitment to the creation of a Palestinian state in the future. Following the endorsing of the Road Map, the Quartet on the Middle East was established, consisting of representatives from the United States, Russia, EU and UN as an intermediary body of the Israeli–Palestinian conflict.

On March 19, 2003, Arafat appointed Mahmoud Abbas as the Prime Minister. The rest of Abbas's term as prime minister continued to be characterized by numerous conflicts between him and Arafat over the distribution of power between the two. The United States and Israel accused Arafat of constantly undermining Abbas and his government. Continuing violence and Israeli "target killings" of known terrorists forced Abbas to pledge a crackdown in order to uphold the Palestinian Authority's side of the Road map for peace. This led to a power struggle with Arafat over control of the Palestinian security services; Arafat refused to release control to Abbas, thus preventing him from using them in a crackdown on militants. Abbas resigned from the post of Prime Minister in October 2003, citing lack of support from Israel and the United States as well as "internal incitement" against his government.

In the end of 2003, Sharon embarked on a course of unilateral withdrawal from the Gaza Strip, while maintaining control of its coastline and airspace. Sharon's plan has been welcomed by both the Palestinian Authority and Israel's left wing as a step towards a final peace settlement. However, it has been greeted with opposition from within his own Likud party and from other right-wing Israelis, on national security, military, and religious grounds. In January 2005, Sharon formed a national unity government that included representatives of Likud, Labor, and Meimad and Degel HaTorah as "out-of-government" supporters without any seats in the government (United Torah Judaism parties usually reject having ministerial offices as a policy). Between August 16 and 30, 2005, Sharon controversially expelled 9,480 Jewish settlers from 21 settlements in Gaza and four settlements in the northern West Bank. The disengagement plan was implemented in September 2005. Following the withdrawal, the Israeli town of Sderot and other Israeli communities near the Gaza strip became subject to constant shelling and mortar bomb attacks from Gaza with only minimal Israeli response.

=== 2005–2019 ===
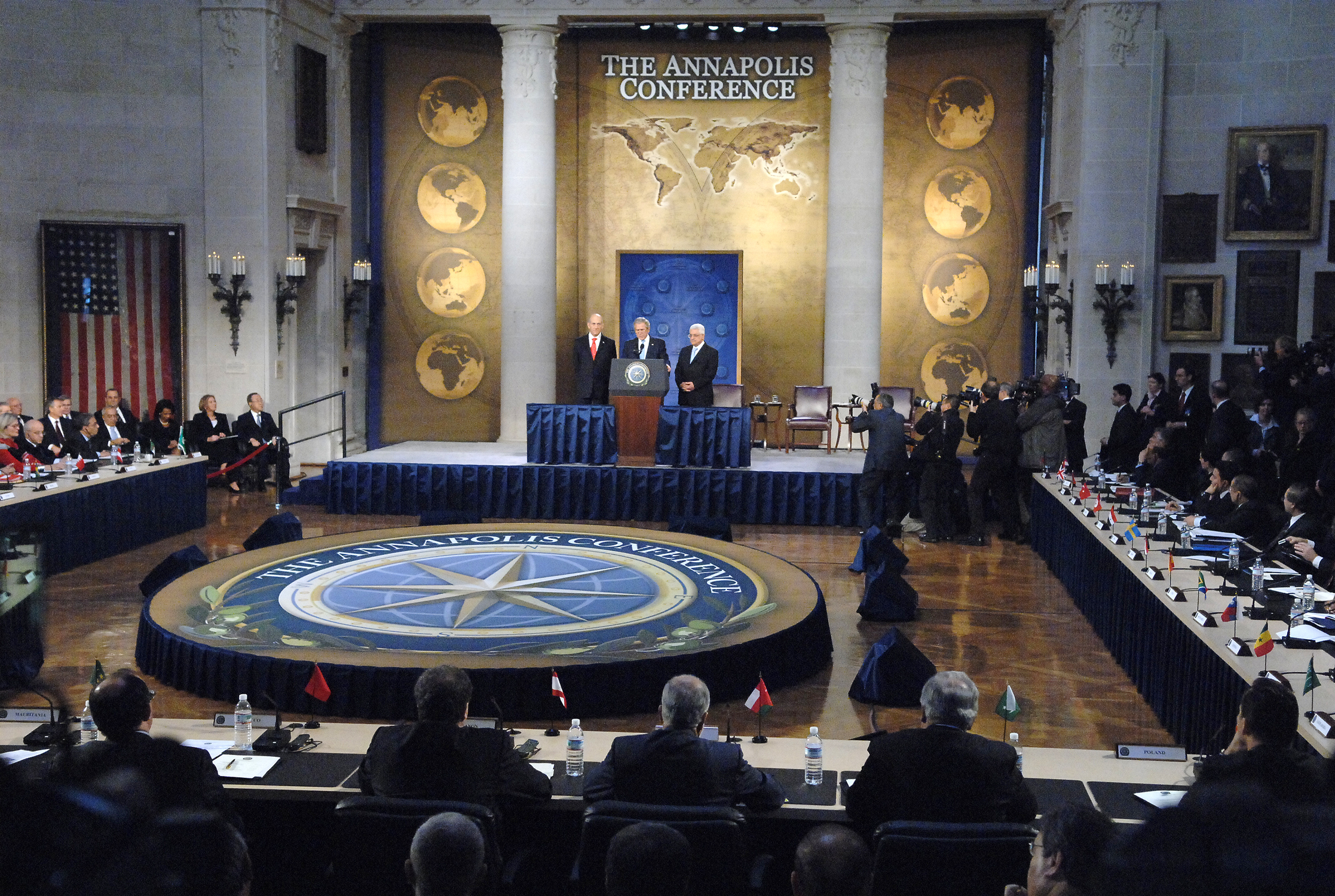
Israeli Prime Minister Ehud Olmert, US President George Bush and Palestinian Authority President Mahmoud Abbas, Annapolis Conference

Following the November 2004 death of long-time Fatah party PLO leader Palestinian Authority chairman Yasser Arafat, Fatah member Mahmoud Abbas was elected President of the Palestinian National Authority in January 2005.

In the 2006 Palestinian legislative elections, Hamas won a majority in the Palestinian Legislative Council, prompting the United States and many European countries to cut off all funds to Hamas and the Palestinian Authority, insisting that Hamas must recognize Israel, renounce violence and accept previous peace pacts. Israel refused to negotiate with Hamas, since Hamas never renounced its denial of Israel's right to exist. EU countries and the United States threatened an economic boycott if Hamas does not recognize Israel's existence, renounce terrorism and support the peace agreements signed between the PLO and Israel in the past. Hamas officials openly stated that the organization does not recognize Israel's right to exist, even though the organization expressed openness to hold a long-term truce. Hamas is considered by Israel and 10 other countries to be a terrorist organization and therefore not entitled to participate in formal peace negotiations.

Footage of a rocket attack in Southern Israel, March 2009

In June 2006, during a well-planned operation, Hamas managed to cross the border from Gaza, attack an Israeli tank, kill two IDF soldiers and kidnap wounded Israeli soldier Gilad Shalit back into the Gaza Strip. Following the incident and in response to numerous rocket firings by Hamas from the Gaza Strip into southern Israel, fighting broke out between Hamas and Israel in the Gaza Strip.

In the summer of 2007, a Fatah–Hamas conflict broke out, which eventually led to Hamas taking control of the Gaza Strip, which in practice divided the Palestinian Authority into two. Various forces affiliated with Fatah engaged in combat with Hamas, in numerous gun battles. Most Fatah leaders escaped to Egypt and the West Bank, while some were captured and killed. Fatah remained in control of the West Bank, and President Abbas formed a new governing coalition, which some critics of Fatah said subverts the Palestinian Constitution and excludes the majority government of Hamas.

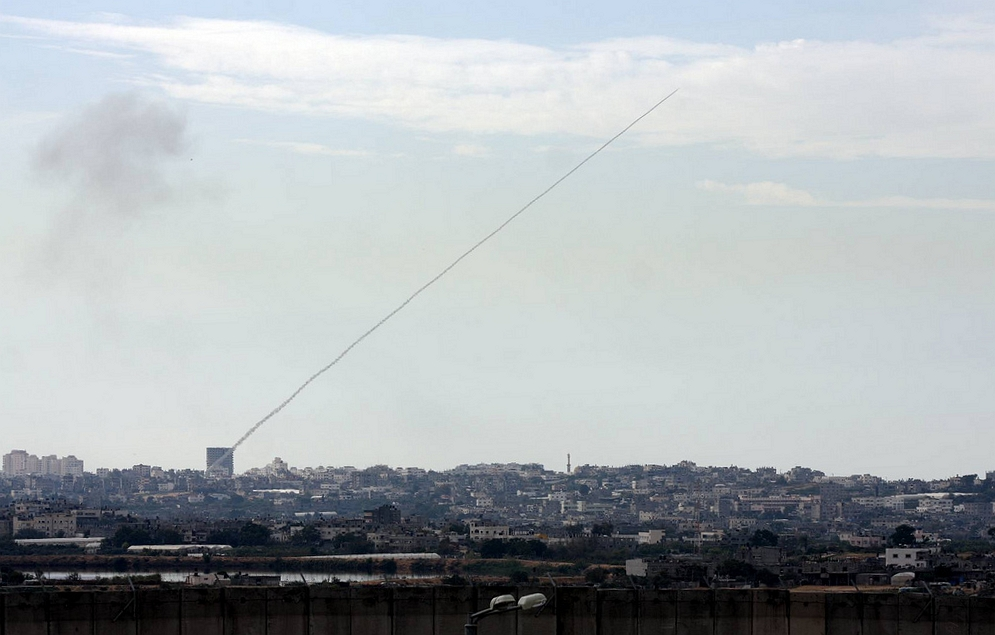
A Qassam rocket fired from a civilian area in Gaza towards southern Israel, January 2009

In November 2007, the Annapolis Conference was held. The conference marked the first time a two-state solution was articulated as the mutually agreed-upon outline for addressing the Israeli–Palestinian conflict. The conference ended with the issuing of a joint statement from all parties.

A fragile six-month truce between Hamas and Israel expired on December 19, 2008. Hamas and Israel could not agree on conditions to extend the truce. Hamas blamed Israel for not lifting the Gaza Strip blockade, and for an Israeli raid on a purported tunnel, crossing the border into the Gaza Strip from Israel on November 4, which it held constituted a serious breach of the truce. Israel accuses Hamas of violating the truce citing the frequent rocket and mortar attacks on Israeli cities.

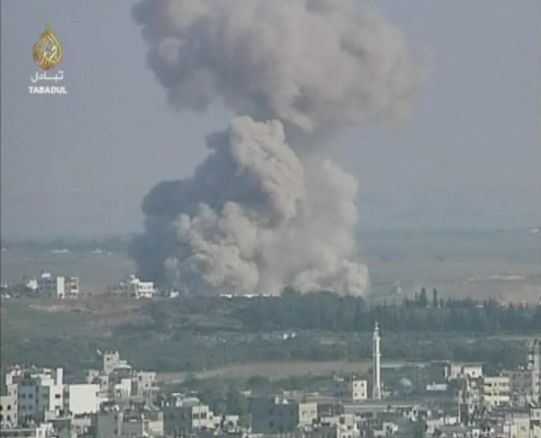
An explosion caused by an Israeli airstrike in Gaza during the Gaza War

The Israeli operation began with an intense bombardment of the Gaza Strip, targeting Hamas bases, police training camps, police headquarters and offices. Civilian infrastructure, including mosques, houses, medical facilities and schools, were also attacked. Israel has said many of these buildings were used by combatants, and as storage spaces for weapons and rockets. Hamas intensified its rocket and mortar attacks against targets in Israel throughout the conflict, hitting previously untargeted cities such as Beersheba and Ashdod. On January 3, 2009, the Israeli ground invasion began. The operation resulted in the deaths of more than 1,300 Palestinians. The IDF released a report stating that the vast majority of the dead were Hamas militants. The Palestinian Centre for Human Rights reported that 926 of the 1,417 dead had been civilians and non-combatants.

From 2009 onwards, the Obama administration repeatedly pressured the Israeli government led by Prime Minister Benjamin Netanyahu to freeze the growth of Israeli settlements in the West Bank and reignite the peace process between Israel and the Palestinian people. During President Obama's Cairo speech on June 4, 2009 in which Obama addressed the Muslim world Obama stated, among other things, that "The United States does not accept the legitimacy of continued Israeli settlements". "This construction violates previous agreements and undermines efforts to achieve peace. It is time for these settlements to stop." Following Obama's Cairo speech Netanyahu immediately called a special government meeting. On June 14, ten days after Obama's Cairo speech, Netanyahu gave a speech at Bar-Ilan University in which he endorsed, for the first time, a "Demilitarized Palestinian State", after two months of refusing to commit to anything other than a self-ruling autonomy when coming into office. The speech was widely seen as a response to Obama's speech. Netanyahu stated that he would accept a Palestinian state if Jerusalem were to remain the united capital of Israel, the Palestinians would have no army, and the Palestinians would give up their demand for a right of return. He also claimed the right for a "natural growth" in the existing Jewish settlements in the West Bank while their permanent status is up to further negotiation. In general, the address represented a complete turnaround for his previously hawkish positions against the Israeli–Palestinian peace process. The overture was quickly rejected by Palestinian leaders such as Hamas spokesman Sami Abu Zuhri, who called the speech "racist".

On November 25, 2009, Israel imposed a 10-month construction freeze on all of its settlements in the West Bank. Israel's decision was widely seen as due to pressure from the Obama administration, which urged the sides to seize the opportunity to resume talks. In his announcement Netanyahu called the move "a painful step that will encourage the peace process" and urged the Palestinians to respond. On September 2, United States launched direct negotiations between Israel and the Palestinian Authority in Washington.

During September 2011 the Palestinian Authority led a diplomatic campaign aimed at getting recognition of the State of Palestine within the 1967 borders, with East Jerusalem as its capital, by the Sixty-sixth session of the United Nations General Assembly. On September 23 President Mahmoud Abbas submitted a request to recognize the State of Palestine as the 194th UN member to the Secretary-General Ban Ki-moon. The Security Council has yet to vote on it. The decision was labeled by the Israeli government as a unilateral step.

On November 29, 2012 the UN General Assembly approves a motion granting Palestine non-member observer state status. UN observer state status voting results were: In favour Against Abstentions Absent Non-members

In 2012, the Palestinian Authority applied for admission as a United Nations non-member state, which requires only a majority vote by the United Nations General Assembly. Hamas also backed the motion. The draft resolution was passed on November 29, 2012 by a vote of 138 to 9, with 41 abstentions. Regardless of the UN recognition, as of this writing, no Palestinian state exists except on a symbolic level. Israel indicated that an actual, real-world Palestinian state can only come into existence if Palestinians succeed in negotiating peace with Israel.

On November 14, 2012 Israel began Operation Pillar of Defense in the Gaza Strip with the stated aims being to halt the indiscriminate rocket attacks originating from the Gaza Strip and to disrupt the capabilities of militant organizations. The operation began with the targeted killing of Ahmed Jabari, chief of Hamas military wing. The IDF stated it targeted more than 1,500 military sites in Gaza Strip, including rocket launching pads, smuggling tunnels, command centers, weapons manufacturing, and storage buildings. According to Palestinians sources civilian houses were hit and Gaza Health officials state that 167 Palestinians had been killed in the conflict by November 23. The Palestinian militant groups fired over 1,456 Iranian Fajr-5, Russian Grad rockets, Qassams and mortars into Rishon LeZion, Beersheba, Ashdod, Ashkelon and other population centers; Tel Aviv was hit for the first time since the 1991 Gulf War, and rockets were aimed at Jerusalem. The rockets killed four Israeli civilians—three of them in a direct hit on a home in Kiryat Malachi—two Israeli soldiers, and a number of Palestinian civilians. By November 19, over 252 Israelis were physically injured in rocket attacks. Israel's Iron Dome missile defense system intercepted about 421 rockets, another 142 rockets fell on Gaza itself, 875 rockets fell in open areas, and 58 rockets hit urban areas in Israel. A bomb attack against a Tel Aviv bus that wounded over 20 civilians received the "blessing" of Hamas. On November 21 a ceasefire was announced after days of negotiations between Hamas and Israel mediated by Egypt.

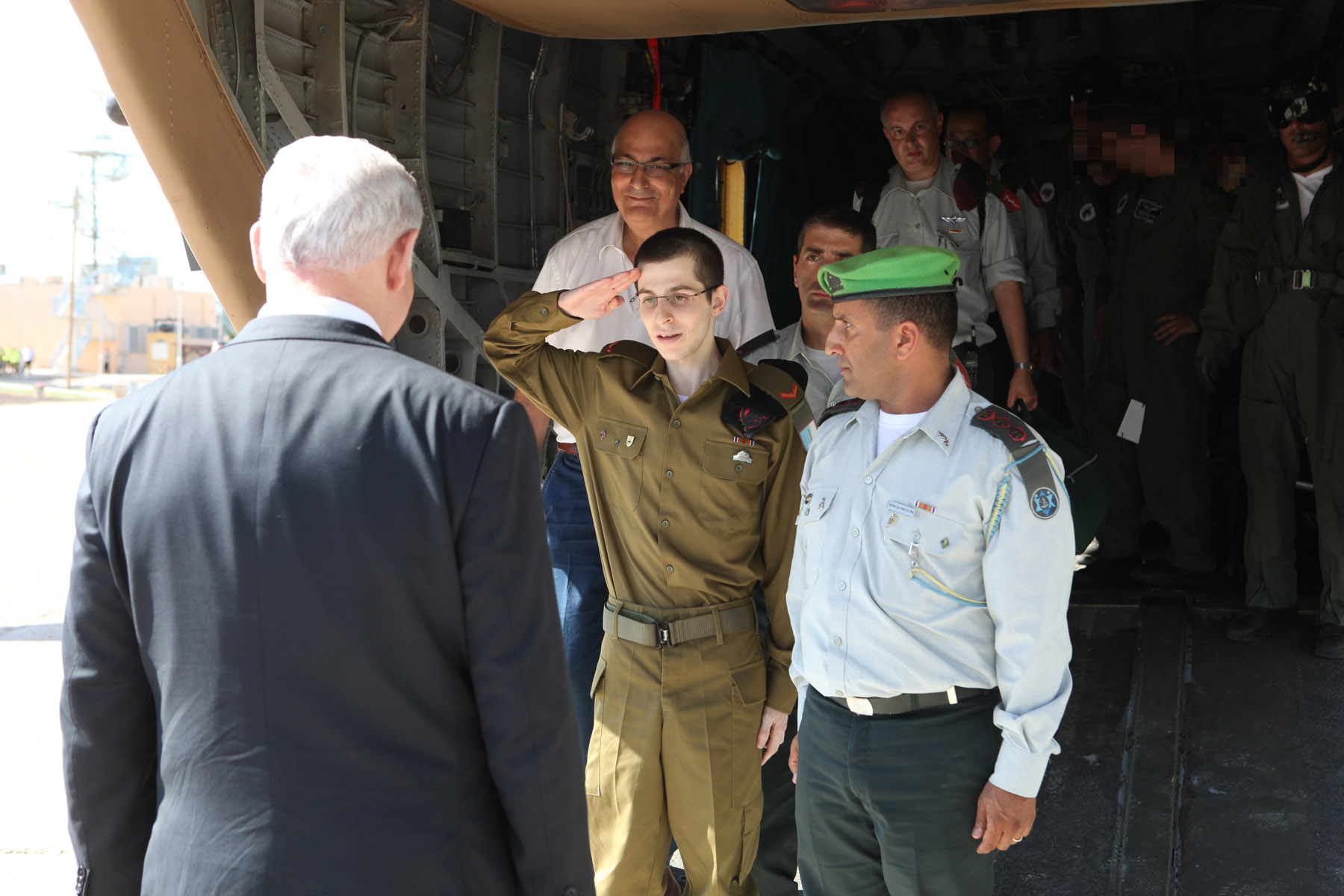
During 2011, as part of the Gilad Shalit prisoner exchange, 1,027 Palestinians and Arab-Israeli prisoners were released in exchange for the captured Israeli soldier Gilad Shalit.

In October 2011, a deal was reached between Israel and Hamas, by which the captured Israeli soldier Gilad Shalit would be released in exchange for 1,027 Palestinians and Arab-Israeli prisoners, 280 of whom had been sentenced to life in prison for planning and perpetrating various terror attacks against Israeli targets. The military Hamas leader Ahmed Jabari was quoted later as confirming that the prisoners released as part of the deal were collectively responsible for the killing of 569 Israeli civilians.

In 2014, another war between Israel and Gaza occurred resulting in over 70 Israeli casualties and over 2000 Palestinians casualties.

=== 2020s ===
In 2021, another war between Israel and Gaza occurred resulting in over 250 casualties. As the war went on, intercommunal conflict occurred within Israel as well. Policy analysts believe that the war decreased the chances of Israeli-Palestinian bilateral talks.

In November 2022, with the election of the 37th government of Israel, a coalition government led by Netanyahu and notable for its inclusion of far-right politicians, violence in the conflict increased, with a rise in military actions such as the July 2023 Jenin incursion and Palestinian political violence producing the highest death toll in the conflict since 2005.

On October 7, 2023, Hamas and other Palestinian militant groups launched a large-scale attack on Israel, during which it initially fired at least 2,200 rockets at Israel from the Gaza Strip. Simultaneously, hundreds of Palestinian militants breached the border, entering Israel on foot and with motor vehicles. They engaged in gun battles with Israeli security forces, killed Israeli civilians and took over Israeli towns and military bases. The attack resulted in 1,139 Israelis and foreign nationals killed, including 766 civilians and 373 security forces; an additional 251 Israelis and foreign nationals were kidnapped to Gaza. In response, Israeli forces cleared Hamas militants from southern Israel before launching extensive airstrikes on the Gaza Strip followed by a large-scale ground invasion, leading to more than 68,000 Palestinian casualties and a humanitarian crisis; a consensus of scholarship has concluded that Israel's actions during this war amounted to genocide, though Israel and its supporters reject this.

=== Death timelines ===
Data is from the United Nations Office for the Coordination of Humanitarian Affairs, showing casualties from January 24, 2008 through May 7, 2024.

- Israeli fatalities
- Palestinian fatalities

== Demographic history ==
The following section presents the demographic history of the Jewish and Arab populations in Palestine, Israel and the Palestinian territories spanning through the last two centuries which has been taken from census results and official documents which mention demographic composition.

=== 19th century to 1948 ===
Demographics of Palestine
Year	Jews	Arabs	Total
1800	7,000	268,000	275,000
1880	24,000	525,000	549,000
1915	87,500	590,000	678,000
1931	174,000	837,000	1,011,000
1936	400,000	800,000	1,200,000
1947	630,000	1,310,000	1,940,000

UN Partition Plan (1947)
Area allotted for the Jewish state		Area allotted for the Arab state	
Jews	Arabs	Jews	Arabs
498,000	407,000	10,000	725,000

=== 1949 to 1967 ===
Demographics in Israel
Year	Israel		Total
Year	Jews	Arabs	Total
1949	1,014,000	159,000^{1}	1,173,000
1961	?	?	?

^{1} The decrease in the Arab population between 1947 and 1949 is due to the 1948 Palestinian expulsion and flight.

Demographics in the Egyptian-occupied Gaza Strip and in the Jordanian-ruled West Bank
Year	Egyptian-occupied Gaza Strip		Jordanian-occupied West Bank		Total
Year	Jews	Arabs	Jews	Arabs	Total
1950	?	240,000	?	765,000	?
1960	?	302,000	?	799,000	?

=== 1967–present ===
Demographics in Israel
Year	Israel		Total
Year	Jews^{2}	Arabs	Total
1967	2,384,000	393,000	2,776,000
1973	2,845,000	493,000	3,338,000
1983	3,413,000	706,000	4,119,000
1990	3,947,000	875,000	4,822,000
1995	4,522,000	1,005,000	5,527,000
2000	4,955,000	1,189,000	6,144,000
2006	5,138,000	1,440,000	6,653,000

^{2} Data includes the Israeli settlements in the West Bank and Gaza Strip as well.

Demographics in the Israeli-occupied Gaza Strip and in the Israeli-occupied West Bank
Year	Israeli-occupied Gaza Strip		Israeli-occupied West Bank		Total
Year	Jews	Arabs	Jews	Arabs	Total
1970	?	368,000	?	677,000	?
1980	?	497,000	?	964,000	?
1985	?	532,000	?	1,044,000	?
1990	?	643,000	?	1,255,000	?
1995	?	875,000	?	1,627,000	?
2000	?	1,132,000	?	2,020,000	?
2006	0	1,429,000	256,000	2,460,000	4,145,000

=== In Jerusalem ===
Demographics of Jerusalem
Year	Jews	Arabs	Total
1860	6,000	6,000	12,000
1892	26,000	16,000	42,000
1922	34,000	29,000	63,000
1942	86,000	54,000	140,000
1948	100,000	66,000	165,000
1967 (July)	200,000	66,000	266,000
1995	417,000	174,000	591,000
2000	437,000	220,000	658,000

== See also ==
- History of Israel
- History of Palestine
- Israeli casualties of war
- Israeli–Palestinian peace process
- Military operations of the Israeli–Palestinian conflict
- Palestinian casualties of war
- Palestinian rocket attacks on Israel
- Timeline of the Arab–Israeli conflict
- Timeline of the Israeli–Palestinian conflict

== Bibliography ==
- Conforti, Yitzhak (March 2024). "Zionism and the Hebrew Bible: from religious holiness to national sanctity". Middle Eastern Studies. 60 (3). Taylor & Francis: 483–497. doi:10.1080/00263206.2023.2204516. ISSN 1743-7881. LCCN 65009869. OCLC 875122033. S2CID 258374291.
- ——— (2014). The Israel-Palestine Conflict: One Hundred Years of War. Cambridge University Press. ISBN 978-1-107-47077-4.
- Gorni, Yosef (1987). Zionism and the Arabs, 1882-1948 : a study of ideology. ISBN 9780198227212.
- LeVine, Mark; Mossberg, Mathias (2014). One Land, Two States: Israel and Palestine as Parallel States. University of California Press. ISBN 978-0-520-95840-1.
- Morris, Benny (2011) [1999]. Righteous Victims: A History of the Zionist-Arab Conflict, 1881–1998. Knopf Doubleday. ISBN 978-0307788054.
  - 2001 edition, New York: Vintage Books
- Morris, Benny (2004). Charles R. H. Tripp (ed.). The Birth of the Palestinian Refugee Problem Revisited. Cambridge Middle East Studies. Cambridge University Press. ISBN 0521009677. ISSN 1365-5698.
- Morris, Benny (2009). One State, Two States: Resolving the Israel/Palestine Conflict. Yale University Press. ISBN 978-0300156041.
- Motyl, Alexander J. (2001). Encyclopedia of Nationalism, Volume II. Academic Press. ISBN 978-0-12-227230-1.
- Sachar, Howard M. (1976). A History of Israel: From the Rise of Zionism to Our Time. New York: Alfred A. Knopf. OCLC 29329907.. See at Google Books the 2013 revised edition of Knopf Doubleday, ISBN 0804150494.
- Sela, Avraham, ed. (2002). The Continuum Political Encyclopedia of the Middle East. New York: Continuum.
- Shillony, Ben-Ami (2012). Jews & the Japanese: The Successful Outsiders. Tuttle Publishing. ISBN 978-1-4629-0396-2.
