= Military operations of the Israeli–Palestinian conflict =

The following is a list of military operations of the Israeli–Palestinian conflict.

== Before Second Intifada (–2001) ==
- 1946
  - King David Hotel bombing _{July}
- 1947:
  - Acre Prison siege May
  - Irgun bombing of police headquarters in Haifa September
  - Battle of Hatikvah Neighborhood December
  - Al-Khisas raid December
  - Balad al-Shaykh massacre December–January 1948
  - Battle for Jerusalem December–July 1948
  - Nakba December–present
- 1948:
  - Semiramis Hotel bombing January
  - Battle of 3 Shevat January
  - Sa'sa' massacre February
  - Ben Yehuda Street bombings (1948) February
  - Operation Nachshon _{April}
  - Operation Cast Thy Bread _{April}
  - Deir Yassin massacre _{April}
  - Operation Hametz _{April}
  - Battle of Haifa (1948) _{April}
  - Hadassah medical convoy massacre _{April}
  - Tantura massacre _{May}
  - Ein al-Zeitun massacre _{May}
  - Al-Kabri massacre _{May}
  - Abu Shusha massacre _{May}
  - Kfar Etzion massacre _{May}
  - Battle of Jenin (1948) _{May–June}
  - Operation HaHar October
  - Operation Hiram October
    - Safsaf massacre
    - Sa'sa' massacre
    - Eilabun massacre
  - Operation Yoav October
    - Al-Dawayima massacre
  - Arab al-Mawasi massacre November
- 1949:
  - Palestinian Fedayeen insurgency 1949–1956
- 1952:
  - 1952 raid on Beit Jala
- 1953:
  - Qibya massacre
- 1955:
  - Operation Black Arrow February
  - Operation Elkayam August
  - Operation Egged October
  - Operation Olive Leaves December
- 1956:
  - Palestinian Fedayeen insurgency 1949–1956
  - Negev desert road ambush October
  - Operation Samaria October
- 1966:
  - 1966 attack on Samu
- 1967:
  - Six-Day War _{June}
  - Naksa
- 1968:
  - Battle of Karameh
- 1980
  - June 1980 West Bank bombings _{June}
- 1982:
  - Bhamdoun abduction operation
- 1985:
  - Operation Wooden Leg October
- 1987:
  - Night of the Gliders November
  - First Intifada December–September 1993
- 1989
  - 13 April 1989 Nahalin raid _{April}
- 2001:
  - Beit Rima raid

== Second Intifada (2002–2005) ==
- 2002:
  - Karine A affair January
  - Battle of Jenin (2002) April
  - Siege of the Church of the Nativity April–May
  - Battle of Nablus April
  - Operation Defensive Shield March–May
  - Operation Determined Path June–July
- 2004:
  - 2004 Israeli operation in Rafah May–June
  - 2004 Beit Hanoun raid June–August
  - 2004 Israeli operation in the northern Gaza Strip September–October
- 2005:
  - Israeli disengagement from the Gaza Strip

== Post-Second Intifada (2006–present) ==
Israeli and Palestinian deaths preceding the Gaza war. Of the Palestinian deaths, 5,360 were in Gaza, 1,007 in the West Bank, and 37 in Israel. Most were civilians on both sides.

- 2006:
  - Operation Bringing Home the Goods March
  - 2006 Gaza beach explosion June
  - 2006 Gaza–Israel conflict June–November
  - 2006 shelling of Beit Hanoun November
  - 2006 Israeli operation in Beit Hanoun October–November
- 2008
  - Operation Hot Winter February–March
  - 2008 Israel–Hamas ceasefire June–November
  - Gaza War 2008–2009
- 2009:
  - List of Israeli attacks on Gaza in 2009
  - Abd Rabbo family incident January
  - Francop Affair November
- 2010:
  - March 2010 Israel–Gaza clashes March
  - 2010 Gaza flotilla raid May
- 2011:
  - Victoria Affair March
  - 2011 southern Israel cross-border attacks August
- 2012
  - March 2012 Gaza–Israel clashes March
  - 2012 Gaza War November
- 2013: 2013 raid on Qalandia
- 2014:
  - Klos C cargo ship seizure March
  - 2014 Nahal Oz attack July
  - 2014 Gaza War July–August
- 2015:
  - Ashkelon rocket attacks June–September
  - 2015–2016 wave of violence in Israeli–Palestinian conflict
- 2016: 2015–2016 wave of violence in Israeli–Palestinian conflict
- 2018: November 2018 Gaza–Israel clashes
- 2021:
  - 2021 Israel–Palestine crisis May
  - 2021 Wehda Street airstrikes May
- 2022:
  - 2022 Gaza–Israel clashes

=== Gaza war ===
- 2023:
  - January 2023 Jenin incursion January
  - February 2023 Nablus incursion February
  - April 2023 Nablus incursion April
  - June 2023 Jenin incursion June
  - July 2023 Jenin incursion July
  - October 7 attacks _{October}
    - Battle of Nir Am
  - Gaza war _{2023–present}
    - Israeli invasion of the Gaza Strip _{2023–present}
    - Israeli incursions in the West Bank during the Gaza war _{2023–present}
  - Israel–Hezbollah conflict _{2023–present}
- 2025:
  - 2025 Israeli military operation in the West Bank January–present

== See also ==
- Casualties of Israeli attacks on the Gaza Strip
- List of Israel Defense Forces operations
- List of Palestinian suicide attacks
- Palestinian political violence
- Palestinian rocket attacks on Israel
- Palestinian animal bomb attacks
- Targeted killings by Israel
- Timeline of the Israeli–Palestinian conflict
