= Beit Rima raid =

2001 Israeli assault on West Bank village

- Part of the Second Intifada
- Location: 32°2′28″N 35°6′6″E; Beit Rima, West Bank, State of Palestine
- Date: October 24, 2001
- Victims: 6–9 Palestinians, including 4–5 policemen from the Palestinian national security forces
- Perpetrator: Israeli Defense Force

The Beit Rima raid took place on 24 October 2001 when Israeli Defence Forces swept into the West Bank village of Beit Rima with tanks and attack helicopters in a search for militants that resulted in the deaths of at least 6 people and the serious injury of dozens of others.

The stated purpose of the raid was to capture those responsible for the death of a Rehavam Ze'evi, a cabinet minister assassinated by the People's Front for the Liberation of Palestine, though it is unclear if any of those involved were present.

It was the first major Israeli military raid into Palestinian-controlled territory, according to Human Rights Watch.

== Sequence of events ==
The incident began when Israeli forces, including tanks, armored vehicles, paratroops, special forces and helicopter gunships, entered Beit Rima, a village of 4,000 people, in the early hours of the night on Wednesday, 24 October 2001.

The assault began at about 01:00 AM with machine gun fire followed by tanks. Mahmoud Suleiman, a member of the Palestinian security forces posted to the village at the time told The Guardian: "There were 30 or 40 vehicles – tanks, armored personnel carriers, jeeps. It felt to me like they didn't leave anything behind in Israel. It was a real war." Suleiman also claimed to be among the first to be hit when an Israeli helicopter fired at his post, killing two of his comrades. Witness reports confirmed that helicopters had strafed the town hall and an outlying police post.

In an interview with The New York Times, the Israeli commander of the operation said the helicopters accompanying the ground forces killed "two or three security men" who were running through the village at the time. Palestinian witnesses later reported that the policemen had been attempting to escape. The commander also reported that his troops killed two policemen, one who approached his soldiers with a rifle but did not fire before he was killed, and another policeman who shot first.

In all, the ensuing violence from the attack, which evolved into a 22-hour siege, resulted in the death of at least 6 people, including the 4–5 policemen killed in the initial assault. Palestinian sources claiming nine dead and dozens wounded. The IDF also detained and interrogated 43 residents of the town alongside the 11 arrests.

According to The New York Times, "three of five men closely connected to killing" had lived in the village at some point, but none were among those arrested or killed that night. Israeli officials later claimed that two men had been connected to the killing, but the details were not released.

The IDF also demolished several buildings and burned another down.

Following the attack, the Israeli army declared the village a closed military area and prevented Palestinian ambulances and medical teams were prevented from entering the village. The measure also prevented a proper count of the casualties.

Under the Oslo Accords, Beit Rima was under the civil and security control of the Palestinian Authority and the Palestinian security forces were licensed to carry weapons. The attack was the first major Israeli military raid into Palestinian-controlled territory, according to Human Rights Watch.
