= Negev desert road ambush =

1956 attack on Israeli civilians by Palestinian Arab fedayeen

- Part of Palestinian Fedayeen insurgency
- Native name: פיגוע הירי בכביש סדום-באר שבע
- Location: Highway 25, Southern Israel
- Date: 4 October 1956; 70 years ago
- Attack type: Ambush, mass shooting
- Weapon: Machine gun
- Deaths: 5 Israeli civilians
- Injuries: 1 Israeli civilian
- Perpetrator: Palestinian Fedayeen squad
- No. of participants: 10

The Negev desert road ambush was a terrorist attack which occurred on Thursday, 4 October 1956 at Highway 25, Israel when a squad of 10 armed Palestinian fedayeen fired at two civilian vehicles. As a result, 5 Israeli civilians were killed and 1 was injured.

== The attack ==
During the afternoon of 4 October 1956, a squad of 10 armed Palestinian Fedayeen militants infiltrated Israel from Jordan. In broad daylight, the militants swooped down on two jeeps on the Sodom–Beer Sheva road (Highway 25), which were traveling on the road section which goes through the southern part of the Dead Sea, 7 miles (11 km) west of the Jordanian border with Israel. The vehicles were carrying employees of the Solel Boneh company.

The militants began by attacking the first vehicle with machine gun fire, killing all four of the passengers in the car. Afterwards the militants attacked the second vehicle. One of the passengers in the second car jumped out in an attempt to escape the militants and save his life. The militants killed him as well with machine-gun fire.

Only one person, an American engineer who was driving the second car, managed to escape the incident.

=== Fatalities ===
- Gabriel Benjamin Dahan (born 1931)
- Ephraim Waldman (born 1907)
- Arie Lahav (born 1921)
- Jacob Lustig (born 1916)

== Aftermath ==
The squad members were arrested on their return to Jordan by a Jordanian police force. Shortly thereafter, King Hussein of Jordan ordered the release of the assailants.

An Israeli Foreign Ministry spokesman blamed the killings on a "well trained and organized group from Jordan." He also stated that the incident "shows a continuation of Jordan's policy of aggression and border harassment".

=== Operation Samaria ===
As a result, Israel decided to retaliate in response to Negev desert road ambush and to an 4 October attack in which infiltrators from Jordan killed two Israeli laborers in an orchard near Even Yehuda and cut off their ears. On 10 October, the Israeli military conducted a counterattack codenamed Operation Samaria in which the IDF attacked the Qalqilya police station at the Tegart fort. After a fierce battle the fort was blown up. 18 IDF soldiers died in the operation and 68 were injured. About 88 Jordanians were killed and 15 were wounded.
