= History of the Israel Defense Forces =

The history of the Israel Defense Forces (IDF) intertwines in its early stages with history of the Haganah.

== Before 1948 ==
Following the 1947 UN Partition Plan, which divided the British Mandate of Palestine, the country became increasingly volatile and fell into a state of civil war between the Jews and Arabs after the Arab residents rejected any plan that would allow for the displacement of so many Arabs. In accordance with Plan Dalet the Haganah tried to secure the areas allotted to the Jewish state in the partition plan and the blocks of settlements that were in the area allotted to the Arab state.

== 1948 Arab–Israeli War ==
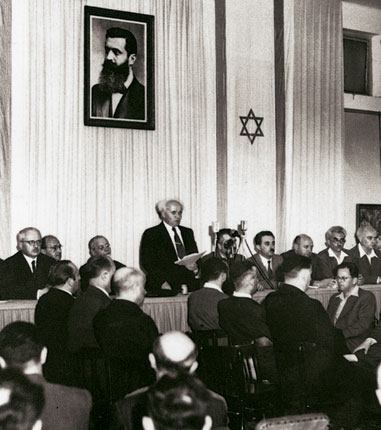
David Ben-Gurion, Israel's first Prime Minister and Minister of Defense, proclaims the State of Israel, 14 May 1948

David Ben-Gurion proclaimed the Israeli Declaration of Independence on 14 May 1948. His first order was the formation of the IDF – The Israel Defense Forces.

The IDF was based on the personnel who had served in the Haganah and the Palmach (itself the elite force of the Haganah) and was declared as the only legal armed force in Israel. Another main source of manpower were the immigrants from Europe. Some of them Holocaust survivors and others veterans from World War II.

Following the declaration of independence in 1948, Arab armies invaded Israel. Egypt came from the south, Lebanon and Syria from the north, and Jordan from the east backed by Iraqi and Saudi troops, in what Azzam Pasha, Arab League Secretary speaking on Cairo radio, declared would be "a war of extermination and a momentous massacre."

In the initial phase of the war, the IDF was inferior in both numbers and armament. Invading Arab armies boasted 270 tanks, 150 field guns and 300 aircraft. The IDF had zero planes and three tanks. Due to a number of reasons, the Arabs never managed to exploit their superiority in numbers. The Israelis managed to successfully defend themselves in virtually all battlefields with the notable exception of East Jerusalem. After the first truce 11 June to 8 July, the Israelis managed to seize the initiative due to new troop enrollments and supplies of arms. Notable achievements of the IDF include the conquest of Eilat (Um Rashrash), Nazareth, and the capture of the Galilee and the Negev.

The war continued until 20 July 1949, when the armistice with Syria was signed. By then the IDF had managed to repel the Egyptians to the Gaza Strip while Jordan took over the West Bank, including East Jerusalem.

See 1949 Armistice Agreements.

== Founding ==
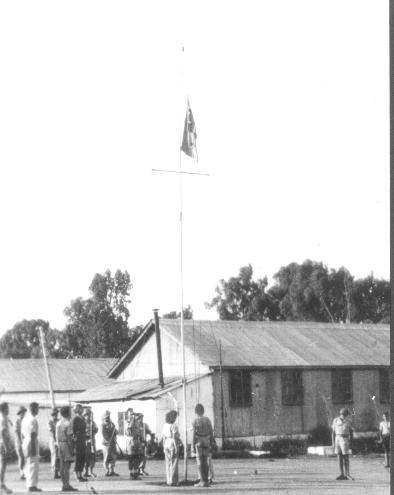
Members of the Yiftach Brigade in ceremony marking the establishment of the IDF. Sarafand 1948

The evolution from several underground militias to a state army is not simple. Many in the Haganah felt it was their High Command's natural role to become the leadership of the new army. The First Law of the Provisional State Council, Paragraph 18, of the Order of Government and Legal Arrangement stated that "the Provisional Government is empowered to set up armed forces on land, sea and air, which will be authorised to carry out all necessary and legal actions for the defence of the country." The sensitivity of this issue is indicated by the delay of two weeks before, on 26 May 1948, David Ben-Gurion, for the Provisional Government, published the Israel Defense Forces Ordinance Number 4. It covered the establishment of the IDF, conscription duties, the oath of allegiance, and the prohibition of any other armed forces. The execution of the Ordinance was assigned to the Minister of Defence, David Ben-Gurion. His priority was the dissolution of military organisations affiliated to political parties. This led to a series of confrontations with leaders of the Palmach known as The General's Revolt.

The army was officially set up on 31 May. This involved renaming existing Haganah and Palmach Brigades and bringing them under one central command. Its officers began to take their oaths of allegiance on 27 June. Lehi and Irgun came under central control in the following months.

Despite several further ordinances the actual role and responsibilities of the Minister of Defense were not defined. Nor was there any legal definition of the Cabinet's civil authority over the army.

== 1949–1956 ==
In those years the IDF started to rebuild itself as a modern army. It acquired heavier weapons and established an armored corps and the Israeli Air Force.

In order to enhance the morale and organization of the army and to combat the resurgent problem with Palestinian infiltration, Unit 101 was formed. It was led by Ariel Sharon, and carried out a number of retaliatory strikes on Jordanian territory to deter the infiltrators. After committing the notorious Qibya Massacre in 1953 it was merged with the Paratroopers Battalions and Sharon became its commander. Unit 101 is regarded as the mother of the IDF's strike force units.

In those years the IMI Uzi SMG and the FN FAL rifle were issued as standard infantry weapons.

== Suez Crisis ==
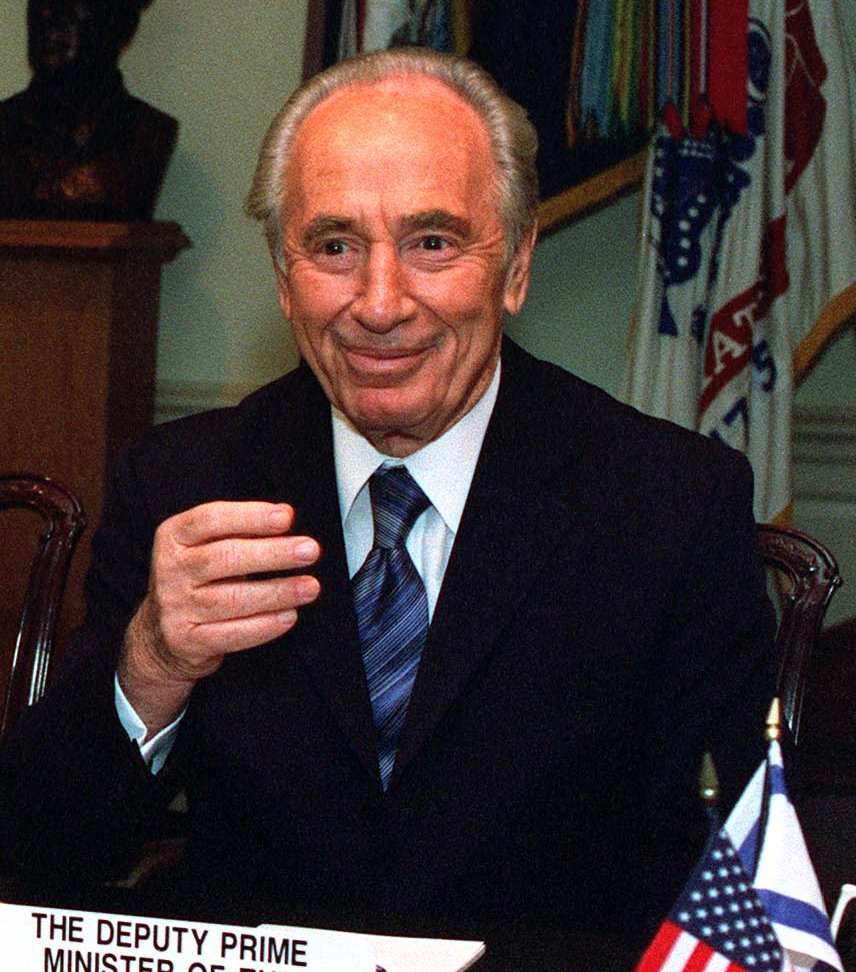
Shimon Peres, Israeli (former) Prime Minister and Minister of Defense: Negotiated France's military and nuclear aid to Israel.

From 1954 and 1955 Egypt established a special force unit known as the Fedayeen. It led to the escalation of hostilities over the Israeli-Egyptian border and eventually contributed to the 1956 Suez War.

In mid 1956, The Egyptian President Gamal Abdul Nasser, encouraged by support from the Soviet Union, nationalized the Suez Canal. In response, United Kingdom and France planned Operation Musketeer (1956) aiming at regaining Western control of the Suez Canal and removing the Egyptian president Nasser. In late 1956, the bellicosity of recent Arab statements prompted Israel to remove the threat of the concentrated Egyptian forces in the Sinai, and Israel invaded the Egyptian Sinai peninsula. Other Israeli aims were elimination of the Fedayeen incursions into Israel that made life unbearable for its southern population, and opening the blockaded Straits of Tiran for Israeli ships. Israeli armour, equipped with tanks, such as M4 Sherman and AMX-13 quickly defeated the Egyptian forces and took control over the Sinai within a few days. As agreed, within a couple of days, Britain and France invaded too and recaptured the canal. Britain, France and Israel withdrew from Sinai under international pressure, particularly by the United States. But the IDF had achieved numerous goals; the borders dramatically tranquilized, Nasser promised to disband the Fedayeen, the Straits of Tiran were once again opened to Israeli ships and maybe most important of all, Israel had illustrated its military strength. The successful war elevated the reputation of the IDF and contributed highly to the morale of the soldiers.

== 1956–1966 ==
Following the successful campaign in Sinai, the IDF used this relatively quiet decade to arm on a great scale and increase military professionalism. The main suppliers of weapons was France, which provided Israel rifles, tanks and jet fighters, including the Dassault Mirage III. The peak of France's assistance was the construction of the Negev Nuclear Research Center near Dimona in 1960.

== Six-Day War ==
By 1966, Israeli-Arab relations had deteriorated to the point of actual battles taking place between Israeli and Arab forces. In 1967, Egypt expelled UN peacekeepers, stationed in the Sinai Peninsula since 1957, and announced a partial blockade of Israel's access to the Red Sea. In May 1967 a number of Arab states began to mobilize their forces. Israel saw these actions as a casus belli.

On the morning of 5 June 1967, the Israeli Air Force (IAF) launched a massive airstrike that destroyed the majority of the Egyptian air force on the ground. By noon, the Egyptian, Jordanian and Syrian air forces, with about 450 aircraft, were annihilated. This strike was code-named Operation Focus, Mivtza Moked.

The Egyptians persuaded Syria and Jordan to join the war by lying to them and reporting on "amazing victories" at Sinai. The two Arab countries reluctantly joined the war, Jordan by shelling the Israeli part of Jerusalem and Syria by entering Israel from the Golan Heights.

Meanwhile, the IDF ground forces quickly overran the Egyptian army in Sinai and were about to reach Alexandria. About 15,000 Egyptian soldiers were killed, 4482 fell into captivity and 80% of the Egyptian tanks were destroyed. 338 Israeli were killed in Sinai and of Israel's losses there were about 63 tanks.

All of the Sinai peninsula was captured. The IDF later captured the Golan Heights from the Syrians and the West Bank from Jordan.

On 7 June Israeli troops (the Harel unit; Yerushalmi unit; and elite paratroopers accompanied by tanks) captured the Old City of Jerusalem The conquest of the Western Wall and Temple Mount was considered as the highlights of the war and a dramatic and emotional peak by the Israeli people. The reunification of east and west Jerusalem as one city under Jewish control were celebrated widely in Israel.

The Six-Day War had great consequences for the state of Israel and the IDF. In six days Israel had defeated three Arab armies – Egypt, Jordan and Syria. Yitzhak Rabin, Moshe Dayan, Israel Tal, Moshe Peled and Mordechai Gur were admired by the public as "war heroes" while the IAF pilots won unprecedented prestige and were considered to be "the best pilots in the world" (even today, the IAF is considered to be one of the most competent air forces in the world).

== War of Attrition ==
Israel's alleged pre-emptive strike in the Six Day War resulted in a French embargo banning all weapon sales to Israel. Israel overcame the embargo by finding other suppliers (such as the United States) and developing and making its own weapons. A strategic decision was made then to make an Israeli battle tank, an Israeli fighter jet, and an Israeli warship – for example: the Kfir fighter jet and the Merkava tank.

After the Six-Day War was over, IDF outposts on the Suez Canal were shelled by the Egyptian army. It was a long and bitter war that ended after three years due to Israeli air superiority.

There were also frictions and battles with Syrian forces on the northern border. In the Israeli reprisal operation ("Three Day Battles" 24–27 June 1970) about 350 Syrian soldiers were killed.

== Yom Kippur War ==
The Yom Kippur War, also known as the "10th of Ramadan War" in Arab countries, tempered Israeli confidence created after the victory of the Six-Day War. This time, Jordan stayed out and wasn't involved in the war. The war opened on 6 October 1973 on Yom Kippur, the holiest Jewish holiday.

Egypt and Syria attempted to regain the territory Israel had acquired in the Six-Day War. Their armies launched a joint surprise attack on the Jewish Yom Kippur holiday (the most sacred Jewish day of all in which each Jew must atone for his sins, pray and avoid eating and drinking) – the Syrian forces attacking fortifications in the Golan Heights and the Egyptian forces attacking fortifications around the Suez Canal and on the Sinai Peninsula. The troops inflicted heavy casualties on the Israeli army. After three weeks of fighting, though, and with U.S. air-lifted reinforcements of weapons and equipment (first shipment arrived on 9 October 1973), the IDF pushed the Syrian forces beyond the original lines.

In the Golan Heights, small groups of tank commanders such as Avigdor Kahalani managed to hold back dozens of Syrian tanks. By 10 October, the IDF recaptured the entire Golan Heights and on 11 October Israeli armored forces invaded Syria and destroyed the Iraqi reinforcements. On 22 October, the Golani infantry brigade captured Mount Hermon (an important strategic outpost).

In the Sinai Peninsula, Israeli armor was unable to prevent or push back Egyptian infantry crossing the Suez Canal. Most of the fortified Bar Lev Line was captured within the first two days of the war. Subsequent Israeli counterattacks launched by reserve forces arriving to the front were disastrous, and the Israelis were forced to withdraw to a new defensive line. On 14 October, the Israelis repelled a renewed Egyptian attack, and the following day launched their counteroffensive. On 16 October the Israelis crossed the Suez Canal and attempted to capture the towns of Ismailia and Suez and to cut off Egyptian supply lines. The Israelis failed to capture either town, but succeeded on 24 October in cutting off the supply lines of the Egyptian Third Army to the south after breaking for a few hours a United Nations ceasefire resolution. The price of the war was heavy. 2,800 Israelis were killed and 9,000 were wounded. About 300 Israeli soldiers were taken captive. Egyptian and Syrian casualties are estimated at 15,000 and about 30,000 were wounded. 8,300 Egyptian soldiers and 400 Syrian soldiers were captured.

In Israel, the war caused a public outrage, forcing the government to appoint an investigation commission. The Agranat Commission found serious flaws in the functioning of the intelligence forecasting branch, which failed to foresee the war and ignored various warnings. The Chief of Staff, David Elazar ("Dado") resigned after harsh criticism by the commission. Although the commission praised Israeli Prime Minister Golda Meir on her leadership during the war, she resigned following the war and was replaced by Yitzhak Rabin.

== 1974–1978 ==
Until 1974, the IDF was countering Syrian and Egyptian attacks meant to weaken IDF posts on the border and force the Israeli government to withdraw. However, the IDF managed to sustain low casualties. The IDF reprisal strikes on the Egyptians and Syrians inflicted heavy casualties. After international negotiations in 1974, the attacks stopped.

Following the French embargo and the U.S. air-lift of supplies, weapons and ammunition, the IDF started to base itself upon American and Israeli made weapons and technologies. The American M16 assault rifle entered service along with the IMI Galil assault rifle – an Israeli variant of the Soviet AK-47. M14 were issued as sniper rifles along with surplus of M1 Carbines given to the Police.

In those years the IDF invested most of its efforts in countering international terror, such as the Munich Massacre, committed by the PLO following its deportion from Jordan to Lebanon in the "Black September" of 1970. The PLO focused mainly on hijacking airlines and kidnapping and its terrorists hijacked several commercial airline flights.

In 1976, a group of PLO terrorist hijacked an airliner with 83 Israeli passengers and held them hostages in the Entebbe airport in Uganda. Israeli elite SF unit – Sayeret Matkal – went on a complex hostages-rescue operation and managed to save 80 of the passengers, with only one soldier lost, the commander, lt. colonel Yonatan Netanyahu, the elder brother of Benjamin Netanyahu. The operation, officially called Operation Johnathan but widely referred to as Operation Entebbe, is regarded by military experts as one of the brightest and most successful covert operations ever conducted.

In those years the IAF received a new generation of warplanes. In 1977 the first F-15 Eagle American warplanes arrived in Israel and only a year later, they logged their first kill in the world when IAF F-15s shot down Syrian MiG (Mikoyan-Gurevich) fighters. In 1980 the F-16 Fighting Falcon arrived and the model's first aerial kill was also credited to the Israeli Air Force.

== 1978 South Lebanon conflict ==
Because of waves of terrorist attacks (most notably the Coastal Road massacre in which 38 civilians and one soldier were killed) coming from the PLO in Lebanon, the IDF undertook Operation Litani, a wide-ranging and thorough anti-terrorist operation that included occupying part of Southern Lebanon in 1978.

== 1979–1981 ==
In 1979 the first Israeli-made Merkava Mk1 main battle tank entered service. The tank was fully developed and manufactured by Israel and exceeded the enemies' tanks in every parameter. It first saw active service in Lebanon and proved to be a great success.

In 1979 the Egypt–Israel peace treaty was signed, when Menachem Begin and Anwar Sadat agreed on peace in return for Israel returning the entire Sinai Peninsula to Egypt. The peace agreement, still valid today, closed the bitter southern front and let the IDF focus on the raging northern border.

In 1981 the Israeli Air Force destroyed Iraq's Osiraq nuclear reactor. The Israeli government suspected that the Iraqis would use the nuclear reactor to build atomic weapons (WMD). On 7 June, four F-16 fighters, covered by F-15 jets, flew 1,100 km to Iraq from Israel, and bombed the nuclear reactor, thus, thwarting the Iraqi nuclear program and severely holding back the Iraqi plans for getting a nuclear bomb.

== 1982 Lebanon War and the South Lebanon conflict ==
On 6 June 1982, following an assassination attempt against its ambassador in London by the Abu Nidal Organization, Israeli forces under direction of Defense Minister Ariel Sharon invaded southern Lebanon in their "Operation Peace for the Galilee". They eventually reached as far north as the capital Beirut in an attempt to drive the PLO forces out of the country.

In 1987 a revolt erupted in the Palestinian territories, leading to the Oslo Accords.

Although the Israelis did succeed in driving the PLO from Beirut and out of Lebanon, they had to remain within southern Lebanon for the next 18 years to secure a buffer zone between other terrorist groups supported by Syria operating in Lebanon and Israel. In 2000, in response to a UN resolution calling for this buffer zone to be maintained by the Lebanese government, and for the Syria to end its occupation of Lebanon, Israel withdrew its troops.

Although Syria eventually withdrew from Lebanon, it maintained its influence via Hezbollah who continued to attack Northern Israel long after the withdrawal had been certified by UNIFL. Four years later, the UN passed resolution 1559 calling for disarming Hezbollah. The failure of the Lebanese government to do so has led to the strengthening of Hezbollah's militants and to the building of an immense arsenal of 13,000 rockets all aimed at civilian centers within Israel.

The rocket attacks by Hezbollah continued unabated for the next two years, and it was these attacks coupled with the incursion of Hezbollah militants into Northern Israel to kill and kidnap IDF soldiers that led to the 2006 war between Hezbollah and Israel.

== 2006 Lebanon War ==
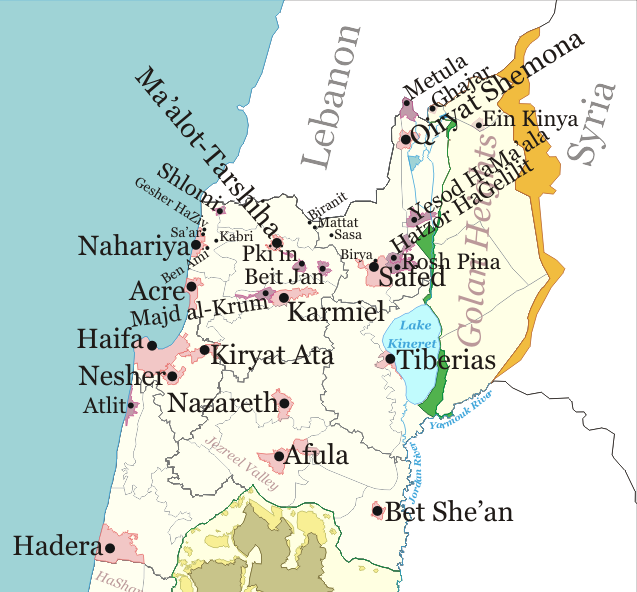
Map showing Israeli localities attacked by rockets fired from Lebanese soil as of Sunday, 16 July.

After the abduction of an Israeli soldier by Hamas on 25 June, the IDF began an air and ground campaign in the Gaza Strip to get back their kidnapped soldier, and end the fire of rockets onto Israeli territory.

At 9:05 am on 12 July Hezbollah's military wing staged a cross-border attack on two Israeli Humvees. The attacks came two weeks after the beginning of the Gaza-focused Operation Summer Rains. Eight Israeli soldiers were killed and two were captured. Later on 12 July Israeli Prime Minister Ehud Olmert called the captures an "act of war" warranting a "severe and harsh response" and threatened to "turn Lebanon's clock back 20 years." In response, the Israel Defense Forces (IDF) launched a military offensive into Lebanon. In the following days, hostilities between Israel and Hezbollah increased to a point of both parties exchanging tough rhetoric and escalating into deadly military campaigns. Israel proceeded by destroying energy and transportation infrastructure throughout Lebanon, focusing on highway infrastructure initially claiming they were trying to prevent the kidnapped soldiers from being removed to Iran. Israeli sources later justified their assault on the infrastructure claiming the roads and airports are used to transport the missiles launched from southern Lebanon toward Israeli civilian population centers. After several days of Israeli attacks Hezbollah leader Hassan Nasrallah declared an "open war" with Israel.

IDF Special Operations took place within the borders of Lebanon. On 22 July Israeli troops in large numbers moved into Lebanon to demolish Hezbollah outposts, and diminish Hezbollah missile capabilities.

== 2023-present Israel-Palestine War ==
The Gaza war (Note: Also referred to as the "Israel–Hamas war", "war on Gaza", "Operation Iron Swords" (Hebrew: מלחמת חרבות ברזל), the "battle of al-Aqsa Flood" (Arabic: معركة طوفان الأقصى), "October 7 war", and others. For more information, see Names.) is an armed conflict in the Gaza Strip and Israel, fought since 7 October 2023, as part of the unresolved Israeli–Palestinian and Gaza–Israel conflicts dating back to the 20th century. On 7 October 2023, Hamas and other Palestinian militant groups launched a surprise attack on Israel, in which 1,195 Israelis and foreign nationals, including 815 civilians, were killed, and 251 taken hostage with the stated goal of forcing Israel to release Palestinian prisoners. Since the start of the Israeli offensive that followed, over 63,000 Palestinians in Gaza have been killed, (Note: 58,380 Palestinians of which have been fully identified as of 17 July 2025.) almost half of them women and children, and more than 160,000 injured. A study in The Lancet estimated 64,260 deaths in Gaza from traumatic injuries by June 2024, while noting a potentially larger death toll when "indirect" deaths are included. As of May 2025, a comparable figure for traumatic injury deaths would be 93,000.

The report from the Israeli army in August 2025 indicated that the rise in fatalities among its soldiers was due to suicide, psychological trauma resulting from the prolonged conflict, and the distressing experiences encountered during the war.

== Appendices ==
=== Other famous generals and soldiers ===
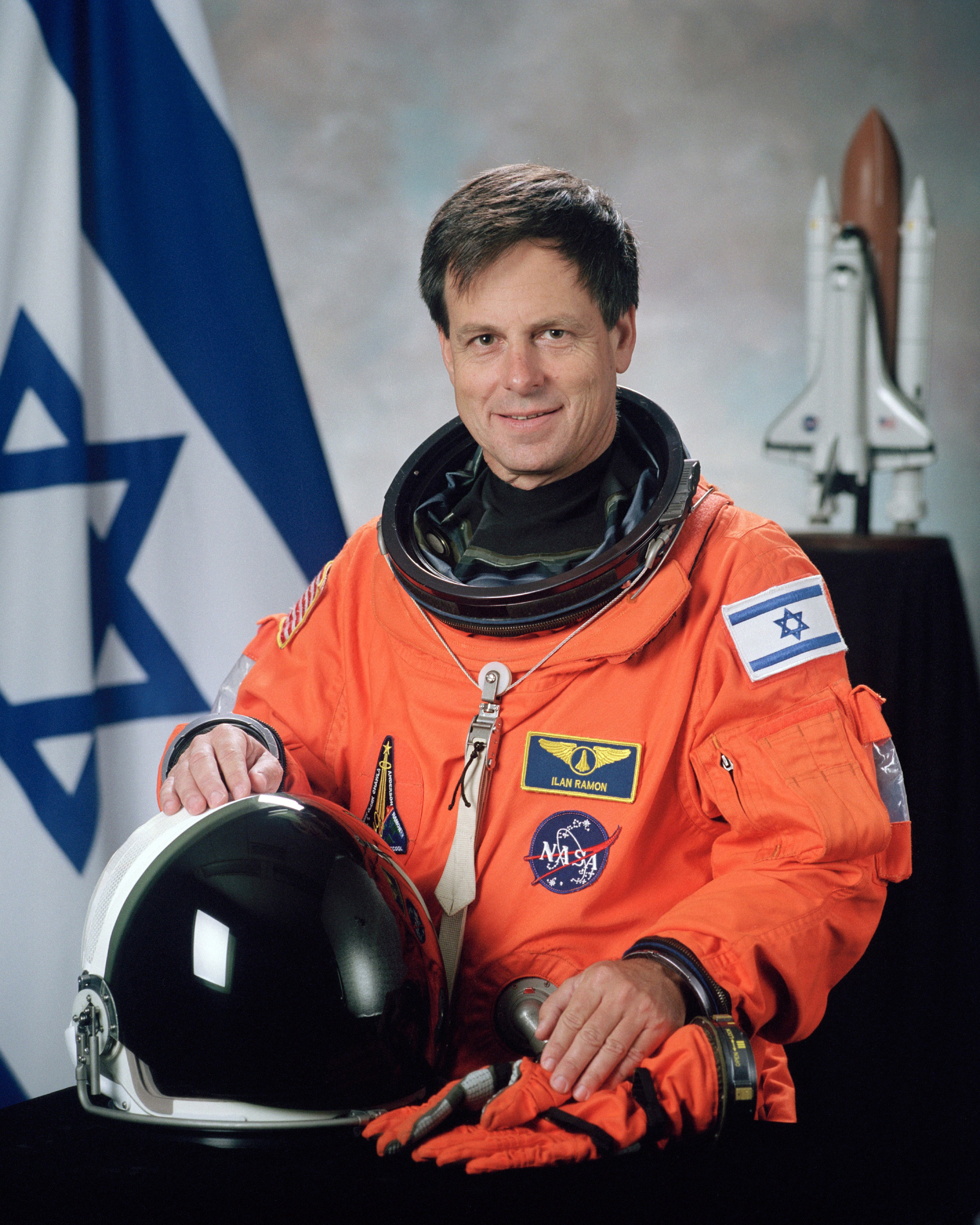
F-16 pilot and astronaut Ilan Ramon

- Yanush Ben Gal, Yom Kippur War hero, held back Syrian forces
- Tat-Aluf (Brigadier General) Efi Eitam, head of the National Religious Party
- Aluf (Major General) Yair Naveh, highest ranking religious combat general
- Tat-Aluf Arie Eldad, chief military physician, professor of medicine
- Aluf-Mishne (Colonel) Imad Fares, Druze officer, commander of Givati Brigade (2001–2003)
- Amos Yarkoni, the first commander of the Shaked Reconnaissance Battalion of the Givati Brigade, and one of six Israeli Arabs to be awarded the Medal of Distinguished Service
- Meir Har-Zion, Unit 101 commando raider
- Avigdor Kahalani, Yom Kippur War general, held back Syrian forces
- Zvika Greengold, tank commander who fought against enormous odds in the Golan Heights in the early hours of the Yom Kippur War
- Colonel Yonatan Netanyahu, a war hero of Sayeret Matkal, killed in Operation Entebbe
- Meir Pa'il, commander of the IDF officers' college, and military historian
- Aluf (Major General) "Musa" Moshe Peled, armor general
- Aluf Mishne Ilan Ramon, senior F-16 pilot, bombed Iraqi reactor in 1981, first Israeli astronaut, died in the Columbia Space Shuttle disaster
- Aluf Ariel Sharon, commander of Unit 101, general of armored division during Yom Kippur War, prime minister until 11 April 2006.
- Tat-Aluf Yiftah Spector, senior F-16 pilot, bombed Iraqi reactor
- Aluf "Talik" Israel Tal, the "Father" of the Merkava main battle tank project
- Aluf Matan Vilnai, general and Labour Party member
- Aluf Amram Mitzna, general, former Labor party leader
- Aluf Yitzhak Mordechai, senior paratroop commander, former defense minister
- Admiral Ami Ayalon, commander of the Israeli Navy and later head of the Shin Bet internal security service.
- Aluf Meir Zorea, Major-General and Commander of Tank Corps during 1967 War.
- Rav aluf Benny Gantz, served as the 20th Chief of General Staff of the IDF from 2011 to 2015. From 2020 to 2021, he was the first alternate prime minister.

== See also ==
- History of Israel
- History of the Israeli Air Force
- History of the Arab–Israeli conflict
- History of the Israeli–Palestinian conflict
- Israeli casualties of war
- Israeli war crimes
- Jewish military history
- List of modern conflicts in the Middle East
- List of the Israel Defense Forces operations
- List of wars involving Israel
- Palestinian political violence
- Timeline of the Arab–Israeli conflict
- Timeline of Israeli history
- Zionist political violence
