= Yehud attack =

1953 attack on Israeli civilians by Palestinian Arab fedayeen

- Part of Palestinian Fedayeen insurgency
- The attack site
- Location: 32°02′11″N 34°53′44″E; Yehud, Israel
- Date: 12 October 1953; 73 years ago
- Attack type: Terrorist attack
- Weapon: Hand grenade
- Deaths: 3 civilians
- Perpetrator: Palestinian Fedayeen squad

The Yehud attack was an attack on a civilian house in the village of Yehud carried out by a Palestinian fedayeen squad on 12 October 1953. Three Israeli Jewish civilians, a mother and her young children, were killed in the attack.

== The attack ==
On Monday, 12 October 1953, a Palestinian Fedayeen squad infiltrated into Israel from Jordan. The militants reached the Jewish village Yehud, located about 13 kilometers (8 mi) east of Tel Aviv, where they threw a grenade into a civilian house.

A Jewish woman, Suzanne Kinyas, and her two children (a 3-year-old girl and a 1 1/2-year-old boy) were killed.

The tracks of the perpetrators led to the Palestinian village of Rantis, then under the control of Jordan, located about five miles north of Qibya.

The attack shocked the Israeli public, both because it was the first terror attack committed in the center of Israel and because the victims of the attack were a woman and her young children, who were killed in their sleep.

== Israeli retaliation ==
Although the commander of the Arab Legion (as the Jordanian Armed Forces were known at the time), Glubb Pasha, promised that Jordan would catch the perpetrators and bring them to justice, on the morning of 13 October a decision was made by the Israeli Prime Minister David Ben-Gurion, and the Chief of Staff Mordechai Maklef, deputy chief of staff Moshe Dayan and acting defense minister Pinhas Lavon, of retaliation in response to the Yehud attack. About 130 IDF soldiers participated in the reprisal codenamed Operation Shoshana (after the three-year-old girl killed in the Yehud attack), which was commanded by Ariel Sharon. The IDF force arrived at the village of Qibya, threw grenades and fired through the windows and doors of the houses. Then blew up 45 houses, a school, and a mosque. About 60 civilians, mostly women and children, were killed.

The act was condemned by the U.S. State Department, the UN Security Council, and by Jewish communities worldwide.
