= Ma'ale Akrabim massacre =

1954 attack on Israeli civilians by Arab fedayeen

- Part of the Palestinian Fedayeen insurgency
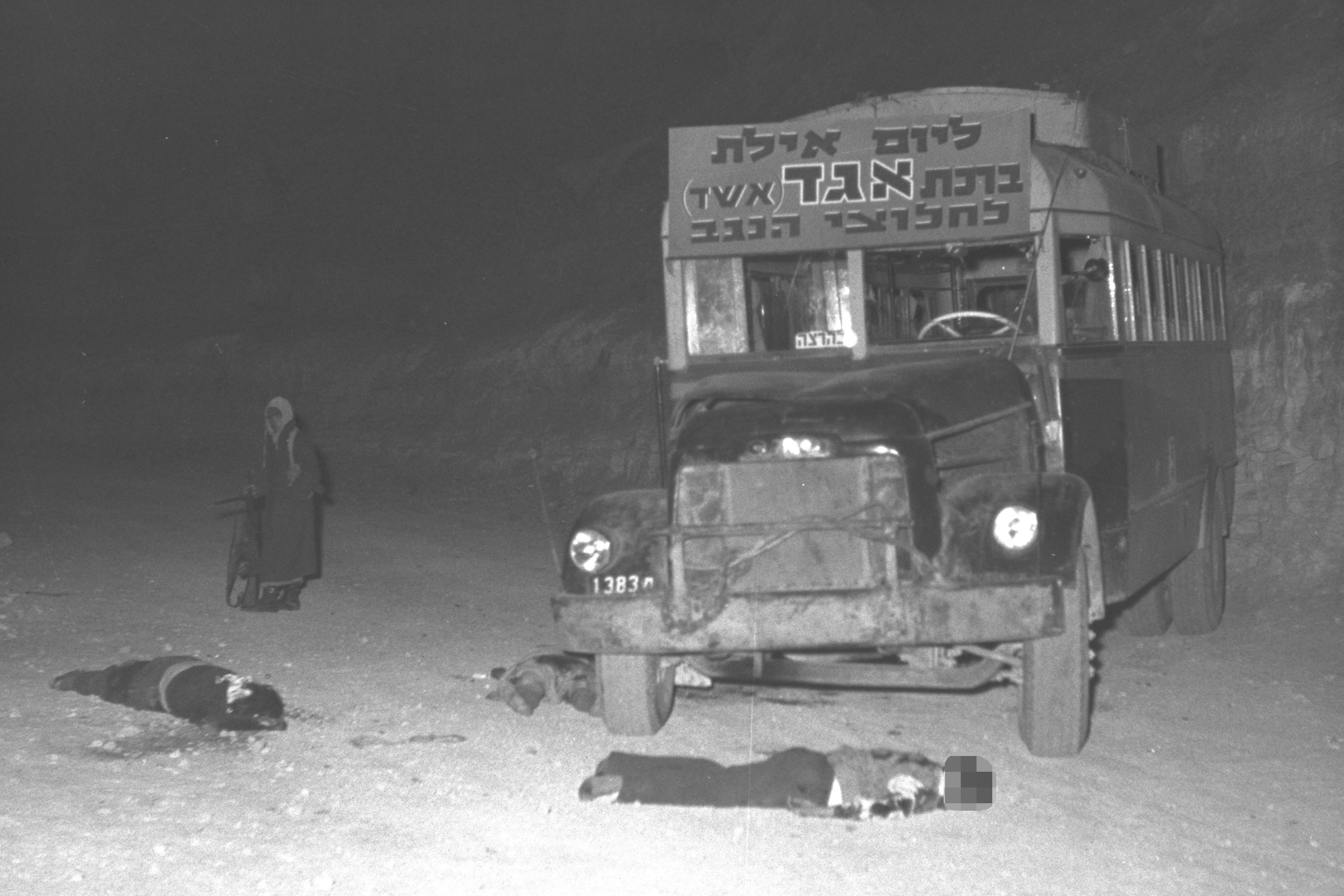
- The bus after the incident

- Location of the attack (Near the Ein Netafim spring, on Highway 12, Southern Israel)
- Location: 30°54′24″N 35°07′53″E; Scorpions Pass, south of Makhtesh Katan
- Date: 16/17 March 1954 (IST, UTC +2)
- Attack type: Ambush
- Deaths: 12
- Injuries: 2

The Ma'ale Akrabim massacre, known in English as the Scorpions' Pass Massacre, was an attack on an Israeli passenger bus, carried out on 17 March 1954, in the middle of the day. Eleven passengers were shot dead by the attackers who ambushed and boarded the bus. One passenger died 32 years later of his injuries, in a state of paralysis and partial consciousness. Four passengers survived, two of whom had been injured by the gunmen.

== Background ==
Scorpions' Pass (Hebrew: מעלה עקרבים, Ma'ale Akrabim) is a narrow, winding grade on the old road connecting Eilat and Beersheba, just south of Makhtesh Katan, and roughly 60 miles south of Beersheba. The pass was on the primary route between Eilat and central Israel in 1954. The 1948 Arab–Israeli war ended with the signing of several armistice agreements between Israel and her neighboring Arab states, but border clashes began almost immediately after the signing agreements. On the Israeli–Jordanian border lines, infiltrations, unarmed (71%) and armed (29%), were not infrequent from both sides.

According to Israeli sources, between June 1949 and the end of 1952, a total of 57 Israelis, mostly civilians, were killed by infiltrators from Jordan. The Israeli death toll for the first 9 months of 1953 was 32.

Over roughly the same time (November 1950 – November 1953), the Hashemite Kingdom of Jordan/Israel Mixed Armistice Commission (HJK/IMAC) condemned Israeli military reprisal actions 44 times and claimed it suffered 629 killed and injured from Israeli incursions.

Similar attacks, carried out largely by Palestinian commandos likely with some Egyptian support, originated from across the Egyptian border and the Gaza strip. Israeli historian Benny Morris states that, between 1949 and 1956, between 200 and 250 Israelis were killed by infiltrators and a similar number of Israeli soldiers were killed in action. Other sources give a total of 1,300 killed over this period. Morris wrote, in Israel's Border Wars, 1949–1956, that "Israel's defensive anti-infiltration measures resulted in the death (sic) of several thousand mostly unarmed Arabs during 1949–56."

A group called the "Black Hand", composed of predominantly Bedouins from 'Azazme and Tarrabin tribes living within the al-Auja Demilitarised zone, were carrying out 'revenge raids' principally against suspected informers but also against Israeli targets.

In the Negev, Israel embarked on development projects, which became the target of theft by Bedouins. Israeli security forces' shooting of these Bedouin had created blood feuds in the area.

== The attack ==
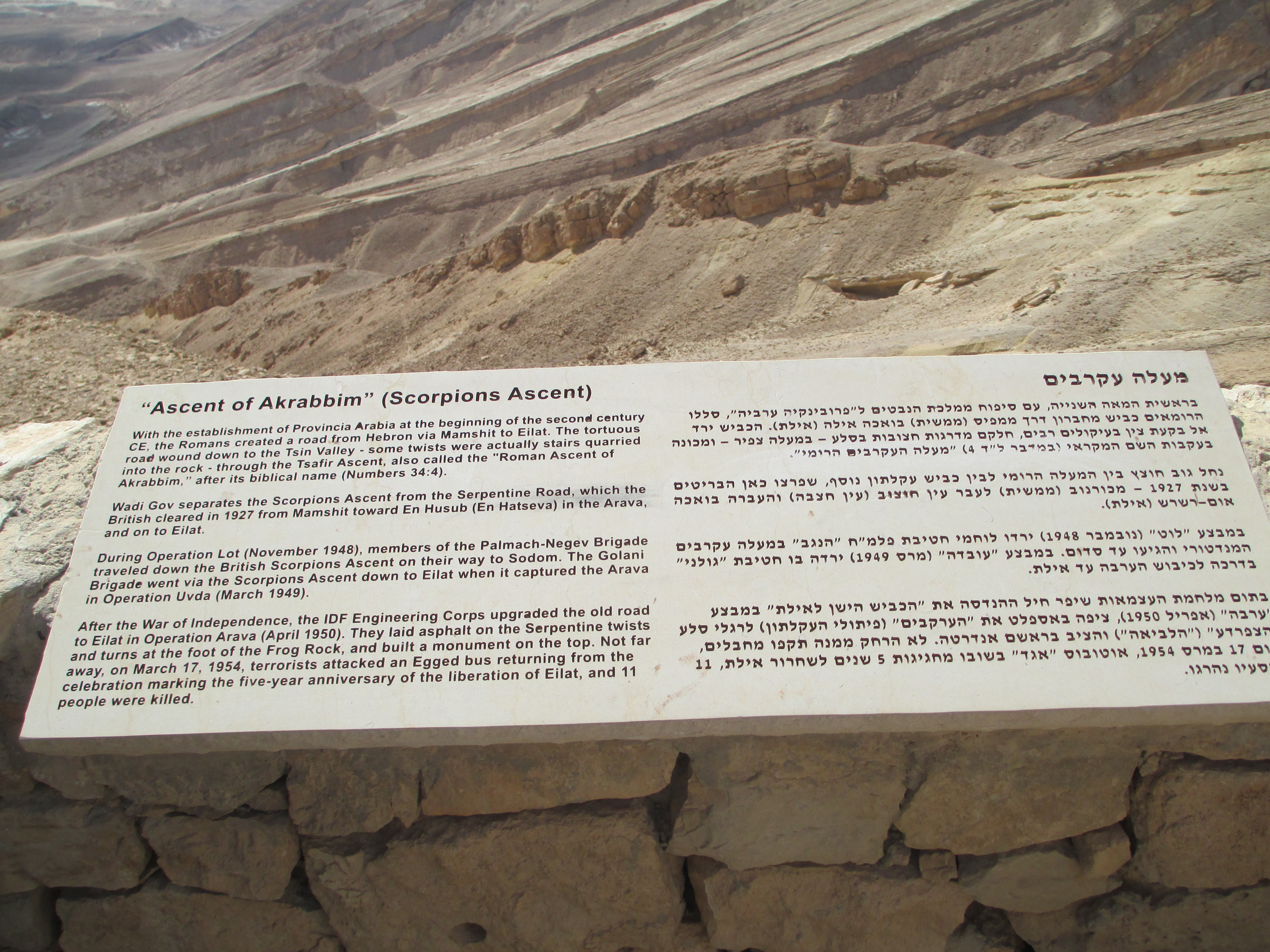
Memorial plate in Ma'ale Akrabim

On the night of 16 March, a bus operated by the Egged Israel Transport Cooperative Society on an unscheduled journey carrying 14 passengers made its way from Eilat to Tel Aviv. As it was ascending the steep grade, it was ambushed by gunmen who shot and killed the driver and passengers who tried to escape; they then proceeded to board the bus and shoot and pilfer from the remaining passengers.

Both the driver, Kalman Esroni, and the alternate driver, Efraim Firstenberg, were killed, along with seven male passengers and two female passengers. Among the passengers killed was Efraim Firsteinberg's wife Hannah who was raped outside the bus and subsequently killed in the sand. The four survivors were two Israeli soldiers, a woman, and a 5-year-old girl, Miri Firstenberg, Efraim and Hannah Firstenberg's daughter, after one of the soldiers riding the bus defended her and her 9-year-old brother, Chaim, with his body.

After the terrorists got out of the bus, Chaim got up, called to his sister and asked her, "Are they gone?" The terrorists heard his voice, returned and shot him in the head. He did not regain consciousness, and spent 32 years in a state of paralysis and partial recognition until he died on 4 September 1986 at the age of 42, becoming the 12th fatality of the massacre.

== Tracking ==
The next day, Israeli trackers assisted by police dogs and accompanied by UN observers followed the attackers' tracks to a point 6 miles west of the Jordanian border, where the tracks were lost.

Relying on informants, Israeli intelligence sources named 3 suspects from the Jordanian village of Ghor es-Safi as the perpetrators, and Lt. Colonel Shalev passed the names to Elmo Hutchison. The Jordanians continued in their endeavours to discover the perpetrators of the attack.

== Aftermath ==
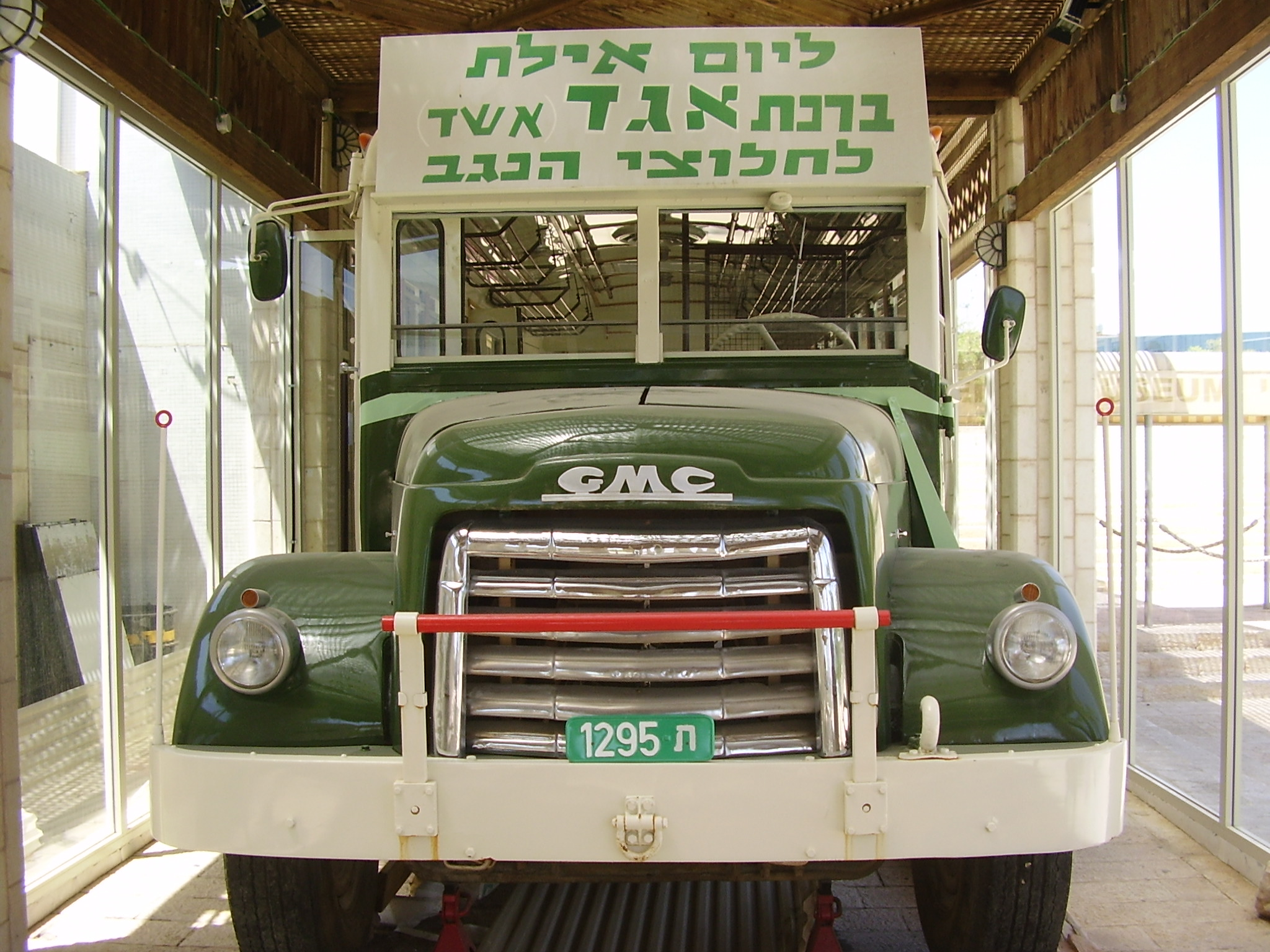
Reconstructed model of the civilian bus that was attacked by the Arab gang at Scorpion Pass.

Despite public outcry and call for military retaliation against Jordan, Israel's prime minister Moshe Sharett called for restraint and diplomatic measures, as less than six months before the events, Unit 101 had attacked the village of Qibya as part of Israel's retaliation policy, which resulted in the deaths of 69 people and worldwide condemnation.

"In Israel, there was a hue and cry for retaliation against Jordan. But Sharett favoured restraint, which helped to repair Israel's image in the West, opposed a reprisal while the memory of Qibya was still fresh. Uncertainty about the perpetrators identity facilitated restraint."

Nevertheless, Israel did retaliate militarily. The Israeli cabinet authorized a "limited" response to the massacre as well as the murder of a guard moshav Ksalon. On 28 March 1954, the Israel Defense Forces conducted a raid codenamed Operation Lion against the village of Nahhalin. A force of the Israeli Paratroopers Brigade raided the village, killing four National Guardsmen, three Jordanian soldiers, the village mukhtar, and a woman.

Israel requested that the Jordan–Israel Mixed Armistice Commission (HJK/IMAC) denounce Jordan for the crime. Jordan's representative to the HJK/IMAC pointed out the possibility of the atrocity being carried out by Israeli Bedouin, and HJK/IMAC Chairman, Commander Hutchison abstained as there was no conclusive proof, resulting in no decision. As a result, Israel left the HJK/IMAC.

Hutchison suggested that the attackers were either Gaza Bedouin or Israeli Bedouin. John Bagot Glubb suggested that the culprits were from Gaza or the Sinai. Glubb offered a £100 reward for the killers' capture. This theory gained credibility when, in 1956, an ID from the Ma'ale Akrabim incident was found in Gaza by Israeli troops during the Suez Crisis. Many believe Glubb had been right and Israel wrong, and that the Ma'ale Akrabim killers had indeed come from Egyptian-controlled territory rather than Jordan.

In 1968, Israeli troops of the Sayeret Shaked special forces unit killed Said Abu Bandak, who was identified as the leader of the group that had carried out the attack, in a clash with a militant cell in the Sinai.

The Israeli Foreign Ministry cited the Ma'ale Akrabim incident, among many others, as evidence that "major Arab terrorist attacks" preceded the 1967 Six-Day War, in which Israel occupied the West Bank and Gaza Strip, to challenge what they describe as common claims by Palestinian and Arab spokesmen "that the recent Palestinian terrorism is the result of the Israeli 'occupation'".

In 2007, a reconstructed bus was placed in the Eilat City Museum.

== Bibliography ==
- Morris, Benny (1997) Israel's Border Wars, 1949–1956: Arab Infiltration, Israeli Retaliation, and the Countdown to the Suez War, Oxford University Press. ISBN 0-19-829262-7
- Hutchison E (1955) Violent Truce: A Military Observer Looks At The Arab-Israeli Conflict 1951–1955
- Political Affairs By Trade Union Educational League (U.S.), Earl Browder, Herbert Aptheker, Communist Party of the United States of America, Gus Hall Published by Political Affairs Pub., 1967
- Avi Plascov, (1981) The Palestinian Refugees in Jordan 1948–1957: 1948–1957 By Published by Routledge, 1981 ISBN 0-7146-3120-5
- Miri Furstenberg, (2018) The Girl From Scorpions Pass: Surviving a desert massacre was just the beginning, Amazon Digital Services LLC ASIN B0791B1MPQ
