= Reprisal operations =

Military operations by Israel in response to Arab fedayeen attacks

- Part of the Palestinian Fedayeen insurgency (during the Arab–Israeli conflict)
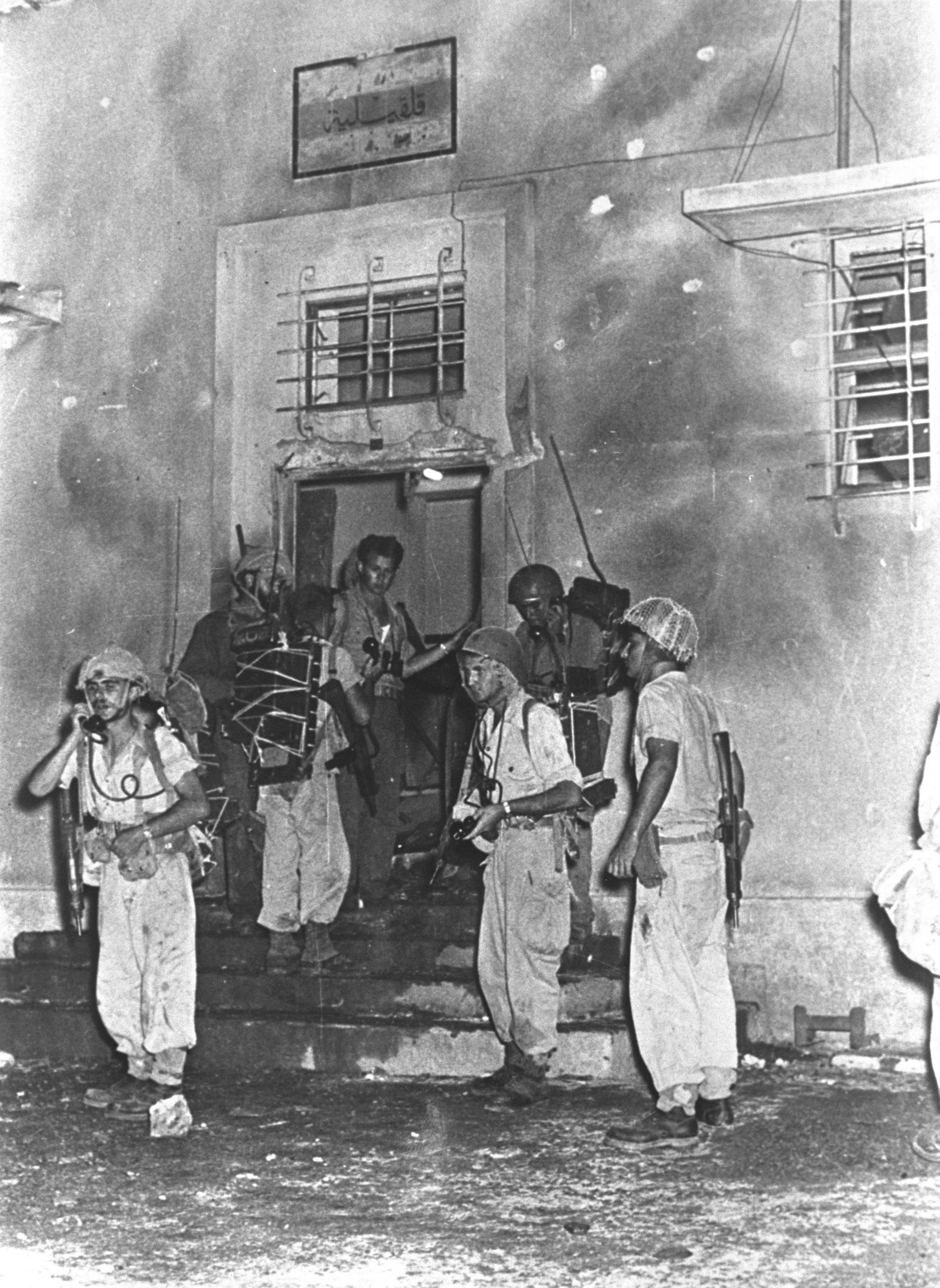
- Israeli raid on Qalqilya police station in October 1956
Date	1950s–1960s
Location	Middle East
Result	Inconclusive

Belligerents
Israel	All-Palestine: Palestinian fedayeen; Supported by: Kingdom of Egypt (1950–1953); Egypt (1953–1958); Egypt (UAR) (1958–1970); Jordan; Syria

Commanders and leaders
Israeli Presidents; Chaim Weizmann (1948–1952); Yosef Sprinzak (1952); Yitzhak Ben-Zvi (1952–1963); Kadish Luz (1963); Zalman Shazar (1963–1970); Israeli Prime Ministers; David Ben-Gurion (1948–1954, 1955–1963); Moshe Sharett (1954–1955); Levi Eshkol (1963–1969)	Gamal Abdel Nasser; President of Egypt (1956–1970); Hafez al-Assad; President of Syria (1971-2000); Hussein bin Talal; King of Jordan (1952–1999)

Casualties and losses
400–967 civilians and soldiers killed during this period by fedayeen attacks (1951–55)	2,700–5,000 civilians and soldiers killed by retribution operations (1951–55)

Reprisal operations (Hebrew: פעולות התגמול, romanized: Pe'ulot HaTagmul) were raids carried out by the Israel Defense Forces in the 1950s and 1960s in response to frequent fedayeen attacks during which armed Arab militants infiltrated Israel from Syria, Egypt, and Jordan to carry out attacks on Israeli civilians and soldiers. Most of the reprisal operations followed raids that resulted in Israeli fatalities. The goal of these operations was—to varying degrees—to compel locals and Arab governments to punish fedayeen groups, to prod Arab states into premature war, or to improve morale in Israel. Two other factors behind the raids were restoring public morale and training newly formed army units. The amount of casualties enacted by the Israeli operatrions onto Palestinian villagers and civilians in these operations was disproportionately larger than that suffered by all Israelis during the fedayeen's attacks; this would culminate in the 1953 Qibya massacre.

== Background: 1949–1956 ==
Reprisal operations were carried out following raids by armed infiltrators into Israel during the entire period from 1948 Arab–Israeli War until October 1956. Most of Reprisal operations followed raids that resulted in Israeli fatalities. From 1949 to 1954 the reprisal operations were directed against Jordan. In 1954 the Jordanian authorities decided to curb the infiltration due to fierce Israeli activity, and the cross-border infiltration from Jordan substantially declined, along with the number of victims. The IDF stopped the reprisals against Jordan from September of that year.

From 1949 there were infiltrations from Gaza Strip under Egyptian control, and the Egyptian authorities tried to curb them. The Egyptian republican regime told Israel during secret talks that such acts as the blockade and armed infiltration were political necessities for Egypt and Israel had to accept it. From February 1954, Egyptian soldiers opened fire against Israeli border patrols, and infiltrators from the Gaza Strip planted mines on the patrol routes, on top of the conventional infiltrations. However, Moshe Sharet, the Israeli prime minister, did not authorize reprisal attacks against Egypt. In mid 1954 a senior Egyptian military intelligence in the Gaza Strip reported: "The main objective of the military presence along the armistice line is to prevent infiltration, but the Palestinian troops encourage the movement of infiltrators and carry out attacks along the line."

In 1955 Ben Gurion returned to the government, and a reprisal operation against an Egyptian military camp near Gaza was authorized, after a murder of an Israeli civilian in the center of Israel was committed by Egyptian intelligence agents. In the operation the IDF lost eight soldiers, and the Egyptians 38 soldiers. Later Nasser claimed that this operation motivated the Czech arms deal, although Egypt had previously signed arms contracts with Czechoslovakia (which never materialized). Nasser refused to order his army to stop firing at Israeli patrols. Moreover, this shooting was intensified after the Gaza raid. According to Israeli casualty statistics, 7 or 8 Israelis were killed by infiltrators from Gaza annually from 1951 to 1954, with a dramatic rise to 48 in 1955.

Ben Gurion continued to adhere to the status quo and followed the terms of the armistice regime, but in September 1955 Egypt tightened its blockade of the Straits of Tiran, closed the air space over the Gulf of Aqaba to Israeli aircraft, initiated fedayeen attacks against the Israeli population across the Lebanese and Jordanian borders, and announced the Czech arms deal. However, with the revelation of the Czech arms deal, Ben Gurion believed that Nasser now possessed the tools with which to put his aggressive intentions into practice. Ben Gurion therefore attempted to provoke a preemptive war with Egypt.

From December 1955 to February 1956 the Egyptians clamped down on "civilian" infiltration into Israel, yet their soldiers frequently fired across the line at Israeli patrols.

Some infiltration activities were initiated by Palestinian Arab refugees who were ostensibly looking for relatives, returning to their homes, recovering possessions, tending to their fields, collecting their crops, as well as exacting revenge. Half of Jordan's prison population at the time consisted of people arrested for attempting to return to, or illegally enter, Israeli territory, but the number of complaints filed by Israel over infiltrations from the West Bank show a considerable reduction, from 233 in the first nine months of 1952, to 172 for the same period in 1953, immediately before the Qibya massacre. This marked reduction was in good part the result of increased Jordanian efficiency in patrolling. According to some Israeli sources, between June 1949 and the end of 1952, a total of 57 Israelis, mostly civilians, were killed by Palestinian infiltrators from the West Bank and Jordan. The Israeli death toll for the first nine months of 1953 was 32. During roughly the same time period (November 1950 – November 1953), the Mixed Armistice Commission condemned Israeli raids 44 times. Furthermore, during the same period, 1949–1953, Jordan maintained that it had suffered 629 killed and injured stemming from Israeli incursions and cross-border bombings. UN sources for the period, based on the documentation at General Bennike's disposal (prepared by Commander E H Hutchison USNR), lower both estimates.

== Policy ==
Israeli prime minister David Ben-Gurion and Israeli chief of staff Moshe Dayan ordered reprisal raids as a tough response to terror attacks. The message was that any attack on Israelis would be followed by a strong Israeli response. In the words of Ben-Gurion, from his lecture "retribution operations as a means to ensure the Peace":

We do not have power to ensure that the water pipe lines won't be exploded or that the trees won't be uprooted. We do not have the power to prevent the murders of orchard workers or families while they are asleep, but we have the power to set a high price for our blood, a price which would be too high for the Arab communities, the Arab armies and the Arab governments to bear.

This approach dominated in Israel during the 1950s and 1960s, although it was not the only one. Moshe Sharett, the Israeli prime minister during the retribution operations, objected to this policy and after the Ma'ale Akrabim massacre he wrote in his diary:

Committing a severe responsive act to this bloodbath would only obscure its horrors, and put us in an equal level with murderers of the other party. We should rather this instance to raise political pressure on the world powers, to have them exert unprecedented pressure on Jordan.

The head of the United Nations truce observers, Canadian Lieutenant-General E. L. M. Burns, was very critical of what he described as "constant provocation of the Israeli forces and armed kibbutzim." His conclusion was "The retaliation does not end the matter; it goes on and on ..."

== Major operations ==
=== April 1951 – October 1956 ===
- Attack on al-Hamma (התקיפה באל-חמה) – Following the el-Ḥamma incident on 4 April 1951 in which seven Israeli soldiers were killed after attempting to enforce Israel's claimed sovereignty in the demilitarized zone to include the el-Ḥamma enclave – Hamat Gader. The next day the first retribution operation since signing the cease-fire agreements was carried out. Unlike the following retribution operations, this operation was carried out by the Israeli Air Force. The operation failed when the attacking planes missed their target.
- Beit Jala raid – In reprisal for the rape and murder of a Jewish girl in Israeli-controlled Jerusalem, three houses in the Palestinian Arab village of Beit Jalla are blown up, and seven Arab civilians are killed. Israel formally denies involvement, but international investigators blame an IDF platoon for the raid.
- Operation Shoshana (מבצע שושנה), also known as the Qibya massacre – On 14 October 1953, a force commanded by Ariel Sharon, attacked the village of Qibya in the then Jordanian-controlled West Bank during the night, killing 69 villagers, two thirds of them women and children. In addition to that, forty-five houses, a school, and a mosque were destroyed. The Israeli force was made up of paratroopers and members of Unit 101. The massacre occurred following an attack in which an Israeli mother and her two children were killed.
- Operation Black Arrow (מבצע חץ שחור) – Carried out in Egyptian-control Gaza between 28 February until 1 March 1955. The operation was aimed at the Egyptian army. Thirty eight Egyptian soldiers were killed during the operation with 30 injured; eight IDF soldiers were also killed and 13 were injured. According to President Gamal Abdel Nasser, this operation was the main motivation for the Egyptian-Czech arms deal later in 1955.
- Operation Elkayam (מבצע אלקיים) – Carried out on 31 August 1955 against the police forces of Khan Yunis from where attacks had been carried out against Israelis. 72 Egyptian soldiers were killed during the operation. The operation was followed by a massive buildup of Egyptian troops in the Gaza Strip.
- Operation Egged (מבצע אגד) – Following an Egyptian border provocation in the Nitzana Demilitarized Zone, two-hundred paratroopers carried out a reprisal raid against an Egyptian military post at Kuntilla on 28–29 October 1955. Twelve Egyptian soldiers were killed and twenty-nine others were taken prisoner.
- Operation Volcano (מבצע הר געש) – Following the invasion of the Egyptian forces into an Israeli youth village and communal settlement Nitzana in the Demilitarized Zone, the IDF carried out an attack in that area on 2 November 1955. 81 Egyptian soldiers were killed during the operations and 55 were captured. Seven IDF soldiers were killed during the operation.
- Operation Olive Leaves (מבצע עלי זית) – Carried out on 11 December 1955 at Syrian posts located on the eastern coast of the Sea of Galilee in response to constant Syrian attacks on Israeli fishermen. 54 Syrian soldiers were killed and 30 were captured. Six IDF soldiers were killed during the operation.
- Operation Sa'ir (מבצע שעיר) – Carried out on 22 October 1955, the IDF forces raided Syrian outposts on the slopes of the Golan Heights.
- Targeted killings – In July 1956, Israeli military intelligence assassinated two Egyptian officers considered to be key organizers of fedayeen raids into Israel in an operation planned by Major General Yehoshafat Harkabi. Colonel Mustafa Hafez, head of Egyptian intelligence in the Gaza Strip, was assassinated on 11 July 1956 after opening a package containing a bomb that was brought to him by an Egyptian double agent. On 13 July 1956, Colonel Salah Mustafa, the Egyptian military attache in Amman, received a similar package by mail and was killed after opening it.
- Operation Jonathan (1956) (מבצע יונתן) – An attack carried out on 11–12 September 1956 by two paratroop companies on Khirbet al Rahwa police fort, on the Hebron–Beersheba road, in which over twenty Jordanian soldiers and policemen were killed. Amongst the Israeli wounded was Captain Meir Har-Zion.
- Operation Gulliver (מבצע גוליבר) – Carried out on 13 September 1956 in Jordan.
- Operation Lulav (מבצע לולב) – Carried out on 25 September 1956 in the Arab village Husan, near Bethlehem. The operation was in response to the murder of participants in an archaeological conference held in Ramat Rachel and the murder of two farmers from Moshav Aminadav and Kibbutz Maoz Haim.
- Operation Samaria (מבצע שומרון) – Carried out on 10 October 1956 in which IDF forces attacked the Qalqilya police forces. 100 Jordanian soldiers and 17 IDF soldiers were killed during the operation. The operation was carried out in response to the constant infiltrations from the West Bank, and in response to the constant attacks from the Jordanian army aimed at Israeli soldiers and civilians.

=== Casualties 1949–1956 ===
Between 1949 and 1956 cross border attacks from Israel's neighbours killed around 200 Israelis, with perhaps another 200 Israeli soldiers being killed in border clashes or IDF raids. Over the same period between 2,700 and 5,000 Arabs were killed. This figure includes many unarmed civilians who had crossed the border for economic or social reasons. Most were killed during 1949–1951. After which the average was between 300 and 500 killed a year.

=== January 1960 – November 1966 ===
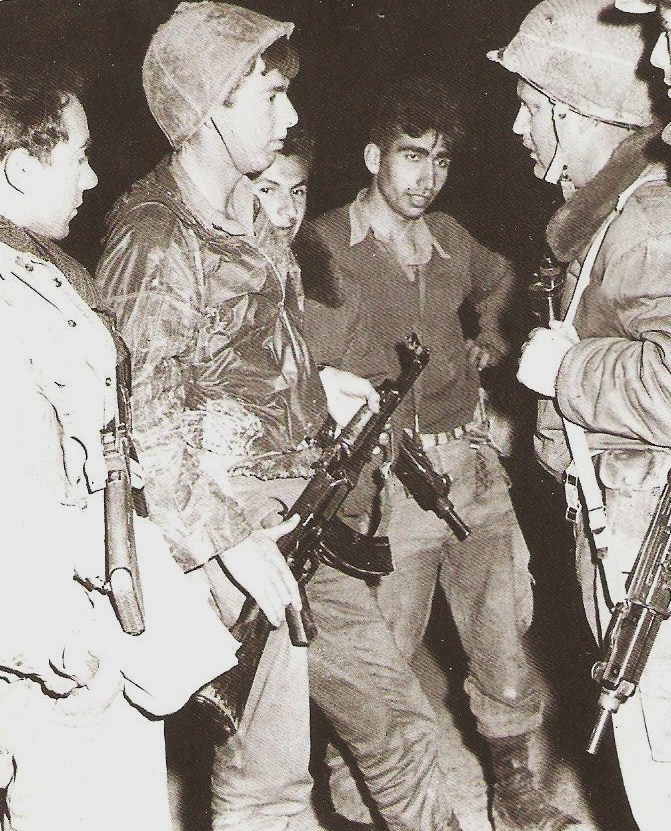
Israeli special forces coordinating an operation in 1960. Different types of firearms are used.

The Sinai War of 1956 ended the first phase of the Israeli retribution operations. The retribution operations policy continued after the Sinai War, but were initiated mainly against Jordan and Syria, because at that time the majority of attacks originated over the Jordanian and Syrian borders. The main retribution operations held after the Sinai War include:

- Operation Cricket (מבצע חרגול) – Carried out on 31 January 1960, was the first Israeli retribution operation carried out after the Sinai war. The operation was carried out by Golani forces at the Syrian village of Tawfiq, in response to attacks on Israelis in Tel Katzir. Tawfiq was designated by the IDF as the center of many Syrian attacks and as a result it was decided that the destruction of the village was vital. During the operation the village was overrun and destroyed while Israeli forces were under attack by Syrian artillery. Six Syrian soldiers were killed during the operation. Three IDF soldiers were killed and seven were injured.
- Operation Swallow (מבצע סנונית) – Another operation which was carried out in retaliation for Syrian attacks on Israeli fishermen in the Sea of Galilee. During the operation (carried out on 16 March 1962), Israeli forces from the Golani Brigade raided Syrian posts in the village of Nuqayb. 30 Syrian soldiers were killed while seven IDF soldiers were killed and seven were injured during the operation.
- Samu Incident (פעולת סמוע) – Carried out on 13 November 1966, brigade strength IDF forces, accompanied by air support, attacked the village of as-Samu, south of the city of Hebron, in response to previous acts of sabotage aimed at Israeli targets. During the operation dozens of houses were bombed while 18 Jordanians were killed. One IDF soldier was also killed – the paratroop battalion commander, Lt. Col. Yoav Shaham. In addition to the ground operation, an air battle was conducted between eight Hawker Hunter aircraft of the Royal Jordanian Air Force and four Dassault Mirage III aircraft of the Israeli Air Force.

== Israeli commemoration of the retribution operations ==
A commemoration site called "Black Arrow" (חץ שחור), which commemorates the various retribution operations and the heritage of the Israeli paratrooper units, is located in the northern Negev near Gaza.

== See also ==
- List of wars involving Israel
- Unit 101
- List of attacks against Israeli civilians before 1967
- Israel's Border Wars 1949–1956
