= Meir Har-Zion =

Israeli commando (1934–2014)

- מאיר הר ציון
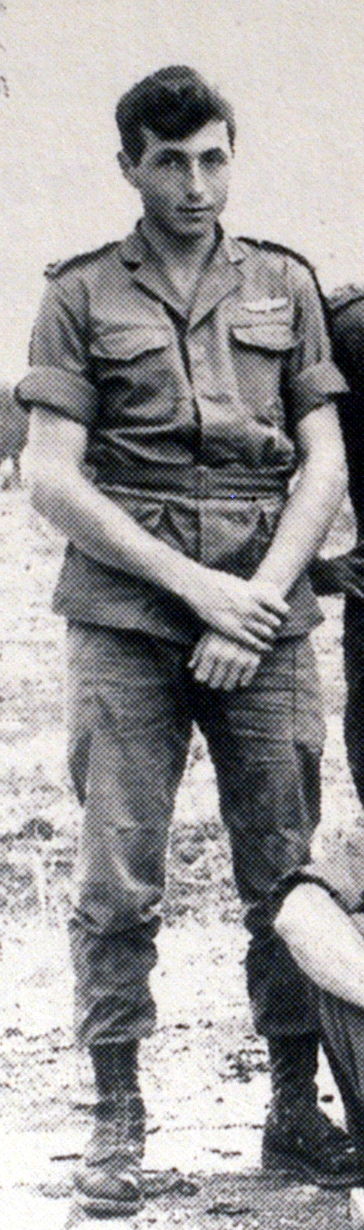
- Meir Har-Zion, 1955
- Born: 25 February 1934
- Died: 14 March 2014 (aged 80)
- Military career
- Allegiance: Israel
- Units: Unit 101; 890th Paratroop Battalion

Meir Har-Zion (Hebrew: מאיר הר ציון; February 25, 1934 – March 14, 2014) was an Israeli military commando.

As a key member of Unit 101, he was highly praised by Chief of Staff Moshe Dayan who described him as "the finest of our commando soldiers, the best soldier ever to emerge in the IDF". Ariel Sharon described him as "the elite of the elite." His three-year military career (1954–56) was cut short by injuries sustained in battle, but he joined in again during the 1967 and 1973 wars. The character of Ari Ben-Canaan in Leon Uris's bestselling novel Exodus is generally believed to have been based on Har-Zion.

== Early life ==
Har-Zion was born in Herzliya in 1934, and was a third generation sabra. His mother, Sarah Goldenberg, had been born in Rishon LeZion to a mother who had been born in Jerusalem to a Sephardi-Jewish family originally from İzmir and a father who had been born in Romania and moved to Palestine with his parents as a child. Har-Zion's father, Eliyahu Horowitz, had moved to Palestine from Russia.

When Har-Zion was three years old, the family moved to Rishpon, where his two sisters Shoshana and Rachel were born. When he was 14, his parents divorced, and Har-Zion moved to kibbutz Ein Harod with his father while his mother and sisters moved to kibbutz Beit Alfa. As a child, Har-Zion spent much of his free time watching nature and taking walks, sometimes crossing the borders of Palestine.

In 1951, he and Shoshana were captured by a shepherd while on the Syrian side of the border. They were held prisoner in Damascus, and the two teenagers were only released by the Syrian government after a month of negotiation by the UN and the governments of both countries, making international headlines.

Being the children of divorced parents, Meir and his younger sister Shoshana had developed a deep emotional bond with each other, and had become extremely close, often illegally crossing into neighbouring Arab countries together.

During the 1950s around a dozen Israeli teenagers were killed attempting to illegally reach the ancient city of Petra, which is located 40 km inside Jordan. Such cross-border treks were considered a rite of passage for elite youth. The song "HaSela HaAdom" (The Red Rock), which praised a group killed attempting the trek, was banned.

At the age of 18, Meir and his girlfriend managed to reach Petra at night, after three days of hiking, crossing Wadi Musa, climbing Mount Hor and bypassing an impassable waterfall. They apparently slipped into the ancient city unnoticed, under cover of darkness, before exploring the Nabatean vestiges. This feat made them legendary figures amongst the Israeli youth of the time, for whom Petra represented an unreachable citadel. "We had only a compass and a map on a small scale, but that was definitely enough to find our way to Petra," Har-Zion recalled.

== Unit 101 ==
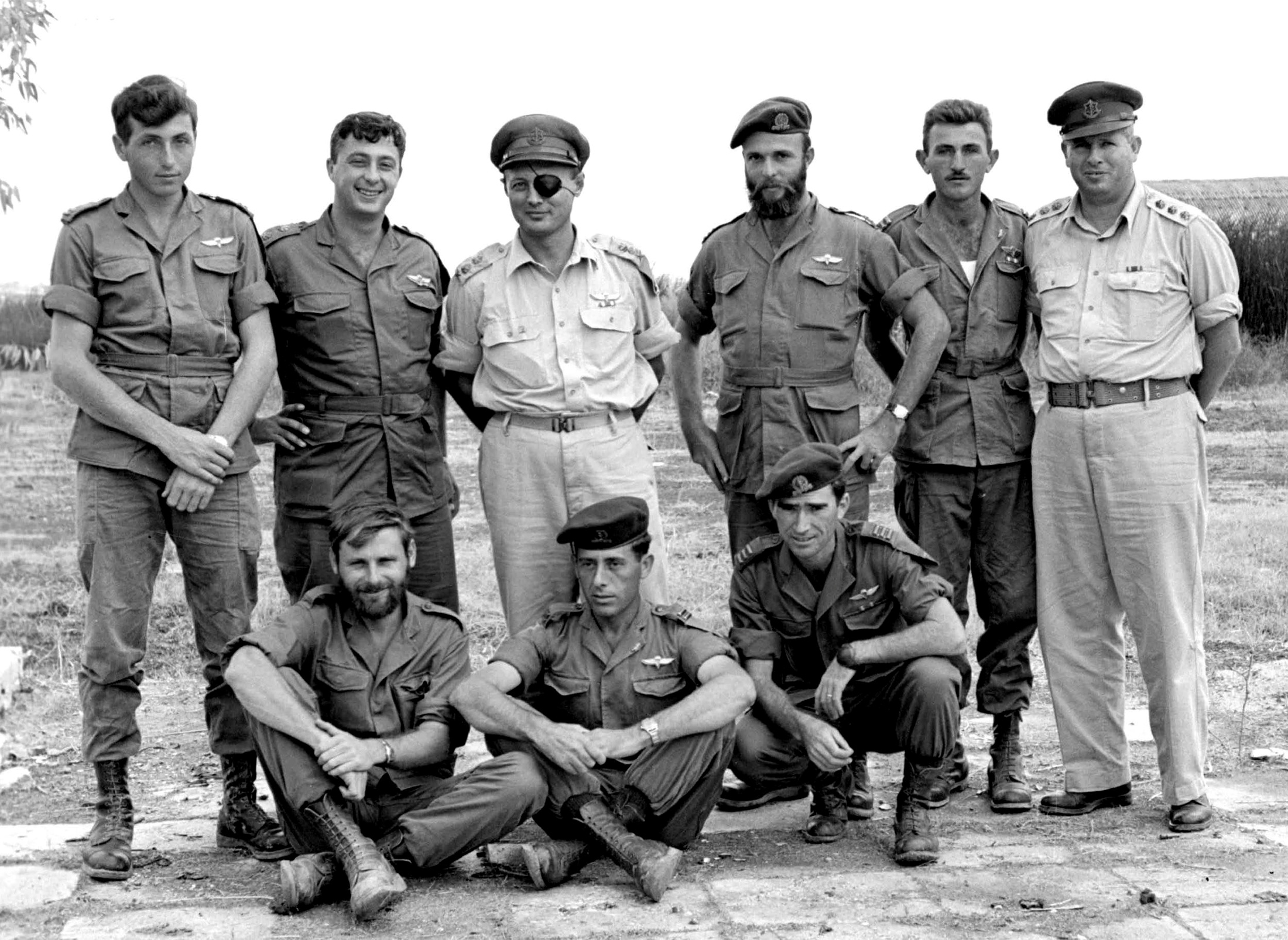
Israeli officers of the parachutist 890e battalion in 1955 with Chief of staff Moshe Dayan. Left to right: Lieutenant Meir Har-Zion – Lieutenant colonel Arik Sharon – Lieutenant General Moshe Dayan (Chief of Staff) Captain Dani Matt – Lieutenant Moshe Efron – Major General Asaf Simchoni – Captain Aharon Davidi Lieutenant Ya'akov Ya'akov – Captain Raful Eitan.

In 1953 he was one of the founding members of Unit 101. He took part in the unit's first operation at the end of August 1953. Sixteen men with two jeeps, two command cars, and a reconnaissance aircraft attacked the 'Azazme Bedouin camps around the wells at al Auja. Their tents were burnt and anyone attempting to reach the well was shot at.

On the night of 14–15 October 1953, around 65 men from Unit 101 joined a larger IDF force in an attack on the village of Qibya, in what became known as the Qibya massacre. Har-Zion commanded one of three squads sent to ambush any reinforcements coming from Ni'lin, Budrus, and Shuqba.

In another nighttime attack on 18–19 December 1953, two Unit 101 squads led by Har-Zion ambushed a car on the Bethlehem-Hebron road. Mansour Awad, a Lebanese-born physician serving in the Arab Legion, was killed. Israeli Prime Minister Moshe Sharett was annoyed that he had not been informed about the attack beforehand. Three nights later. Har-Zion led a four-man squad on a 21-kilometre march to the outskirts of Hebron.

Other missions that Har-Zion took part in included Operation Black Arrow and Operation Elkayam.

== 890th Paratroop Battalion ==
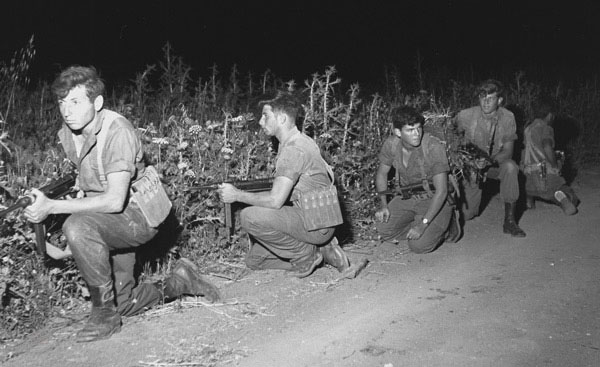
Meir Har-Zion, 1954

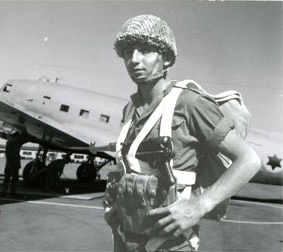
Meir Har-Zion, 1954

The following year, 26 May 1954, Har-Zion was amongst a ten-man squad from the newly formed 890th Paratroop Battalion, led by its commander Ariel Sharon, which carried out a raid near Khirbet Jinba, southwest of Hebron. Two National Guardsmen were killed in an ambush as well as two farmers and two camels. Sharett once again complained about not having been informed, and suspected that Defense Minister Pinhas Lavon had not been consulted either.

On 27–28 June 1954 Har-Zion was in a seven-man squad led by Major Aharon Davidi that launched a surprise attack on an Arab Legion camp at Azzun, 13 km east of Qalqilya. Three Legionnaires were killed as well as a farmer, Rafi'a Abdel Aziz Omar, who was stabbed to death by Har-Zion to prevent him raising the alarm. On their return to Israeli lines, one of the team who had been wounded, Sergeant Yitzhak Jibli, was left behind. On discovering that Sergeant Jibli had been taken prisoner, Chief of Staff Moshe Dayan approved a series of hostage-taking raids.

On 31 July – 1 August 1954 Har-Zion led a group of ten raiders who attacked two police near Jenin, taking one of them prisoner. On their way back, they killed a farmer watching his fields. On the 30–31 August 1954 Har-Zion took part in Operation Binyamin 2. This operation was approved by Prime Minister Moshe Sharett and was commanded by Ariel Sharon. The attackers were divided into four groups. The first attacked a school in the village of Beit Liqya. The other three set ambushes for the expected arrival of reinforcements. Only Har-Zion's group was successful. They had strung a wire across the road with cans of petrol at each end. A car full of soldiers from the Arab Legion drove into the trap. Two were killed, one wounded, and three were taken prisoner.

Sergeant Yitzhak Jibli was released on 29 October 1954, four months after being wounded and captured.

== The Har-Zion Affair ==
In the middle of February 1955 Har-Zion's sister, Shoshana, along with her boyfriend Oded Wegmeister from Degania Bet, both 18, were captured, abused, and murdered by Bedouin tribesmen from Wadi al-Ghar (the central section of the stream called in Hebrew Nahal Arugot, which ends at Ein Gedi) while on an illegal cross-border hike across the Judean desert on Jordanian territory. When he heard of her death, Har-Zion was inconsolable and vowed revenge. On March 4, he and three ex-members of the 890th Battalion drove to the Armistice Line with Jordan. In Wadi al-Ghar, 9 km from the border, they captured six Bedouin from the Jahaleen and 'Azazme tribes. The prisoners were interrogated and five of them killed, four with knives, and the fifth was shot. One of the dead was 16 years old. The sixth was sent back to his tribe to tell what happened. The men probably had nothing to do with the killing of Har-Zion's sister, and had merely belonged to the same tribes as the murderers. David Ben-Gurion told the cabinet that the Israelis did not know enough Arabic to understand what their prisoners were saying. Sharon wrote that it was "the kind of ritual revenge the Bedouins understood perfectly. But the repercussions of what Har-Zion had done were very 20th century. The Jordanians made a formal complaint to the UN."

On their return, Har-Zion and three of his companions were held in custody for 20 days. They were released without charge, as a result of protection and stonewalling by them and their colleagues in the army, and soon rejoined their old unit. Sharett, who suspected that Dayan had advance knowledge of the raid, and who deplored such actions, noted critically in his diary: "The dark soul of the Bible has come alive among the sons of Nahalal and 'Ein Harod".

== End of career ==
Operation Jonathan, 11–12 September 1956, was a retaliatory attack by two paratroop companies on Khirbet ar-Rahwa police fort, on the Hebron–Beersheba road, in which over 20 Jordanian soldiers and police were killed. During the fighting, Har-Zion was wounded in the throat and arm. His life was saved by an army physician who performed a tracheotomy using his pocket-knife while still under fire.

The injuries left Har-Zion unable to continue his army career. He was awarded the Medal of Courage. He had attained the rank of captain.

== 1967 and 1973 wars ==
During the 1967 Six-Day War, Har-Zion was called up as captain in the reserves, and despite the use of only one hand, took part alongside the paratroopers in the battle for the Old City of Jerusalem. In one important exploit in the battle, he killed a Jordanian sniper who had been holding up the Israeli advance: after stalking the sniper across a rooftop, he killed him with hand-grenades.

Har-Zion served again as a captain during the Yom Kippur War, on the Golan front, rescuing injured soldiers behind enemy lines.

== Writing career ==
In 1969 he published his diaries which gave an account of his time as a paratrooper.

Of one of the early attacks he wrote:

Once again I am beset by this strong feeling of discord... the feel of battle, the will to victory, the hatred towards one who wishes to take from you what is most precious of all – your life. These first victories have been too easy.

He also gives an account of the killing of farmer Rafi'a Abdel Aziz Omar during the 27–28 June 1954 operation (details see above):

... A telephone line blocks our way. We cut it and continue. A narrow path leads along the slope of a hill. The column marches forward in silence. Stop! A few rocks roll down the hill. I catch sight of a man surveying the silence. I cocked my rifle. Gibly crawls over to me, "Har, for God's sake, a knife!!" His clenched teeth glitter in the dark and his whole body is tight, his mind alert, "For God's sake," ... I put my tommy down and unsheath my machete. We crawl toward the lone figure as he begins to sing a trilled Arab tune. Soon the singing will turn into a death moan. I am shaking, every muscle in my body is tense. This is my first experience with this type of weapon. Will I be able to do it? We draw closer. There he stands, only a few meters in front of us. We leap. Gibly grabs him and I plunge the knife deep into his back. The blood pours over his striped cotton shirt. With not a second to lose, I react instinctively and stab him again. The body groans, struggles and then becomes quiet and still.

== Late life and death ==
During the latter part of his life he lived in Ahuzat Shoshana "Shoshana's Farm", a 6,500-dunam farm built on a hilltop of Kawkab al-Hawa (Hebrew: הר הרוחות, "Mount of the Spirits") within the Issachar Plateau above the Jordan Valley, just north and in sight of kibbutz Beit Alfa, right next to the ruins of the Crusader's Belvoir Fortress within the Belvoir National Park (Kochav haYarden Park). The farm is named after his sister and her name is written on the gate to the farm. Har-Zion was married and had four children.

He became a right-wing writer and patron to movements such as Homesh First. In 2005, in an interview he criticized his former colleague Ariel Sharon for his policy of disengagement from Gaza Strip.

Har-Zion died on March 14, 2014, from natural causes at the age of 80 at his farm.

Har-Zion was buried at Kochav Hayarden park. His funeral was attended by Prime Minister Benjamin Netanyahu, President Shimon Peres, Defense Minister Moshe Ya'alon, and other ministers and dignitaries.
