= United Nations Security Council Resolution 101 =

UN Security Council Resolution 101
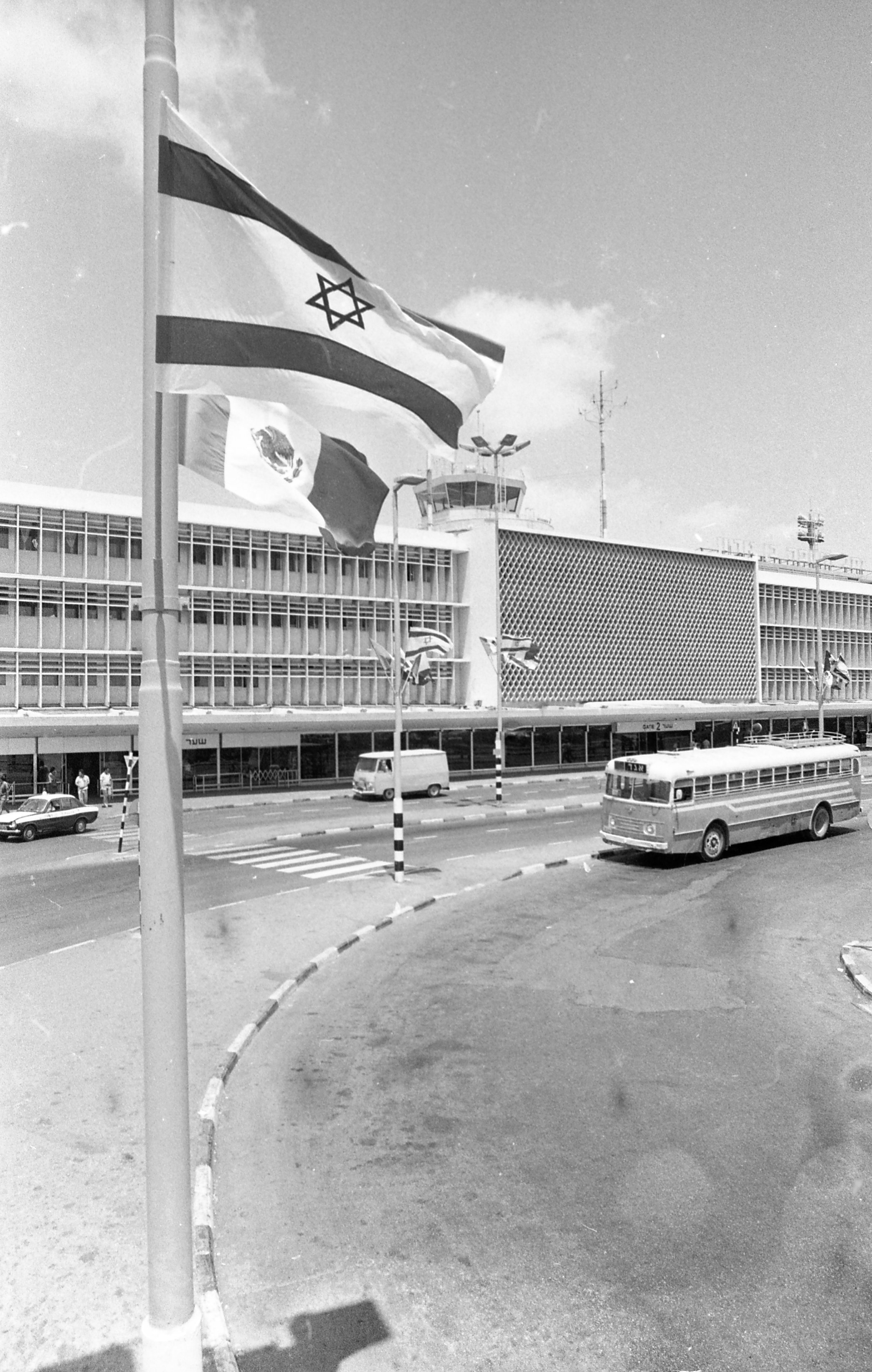
- Israel flag
- Date: November 24 1953
- Meeting no.: 642
- Code: S/3139/Rev.2 (Document)
- Subject: The Palestine Question
- Voting summary: 9 voted for; None voted against; 2 abstained
- Result: Adopted

Security Council composition
- Permanent members: China; France; Soviet Union; United Kingdom; United States
- Non-permanent members: Chile; Colombia; Denmark; Greece; Lebanon; Pakistan

United Nations Security Council Resolution 101, adopted on November 24, 1953, noting reports by the United Nations Truce Supervision Organization in Palestine the Council found that the retaliatory action taken by Israeli forces at Qibya on October 14–15 and all such action constitute a violation of the cease-fire provisions of United Nations Security Council Resolution 54 and are inconsistent with the parties’ obligations under the General Armistice Agreement between Israel and Jordan as well as the Charter of the United Nations. The Council expressed the strongest possible censure of this action and took note of the substantial evidence of crossings of the demarcation line by unauthorized persons. The Council then called on the Israeli and Jordanian governments to co-operate with each other and requested that the Chief of Staff of the TSO report within three months with recommendations.

The resolution was adopted by nine votes to none; Lebanon and the Soviet Union abstained from the vote.

== See also ==
- List of United Nations Security Council Resolutions 101 to 200 (1953–1965)
