= Shlomo Baum =

Israeli military commando fighter

- שלמה באום
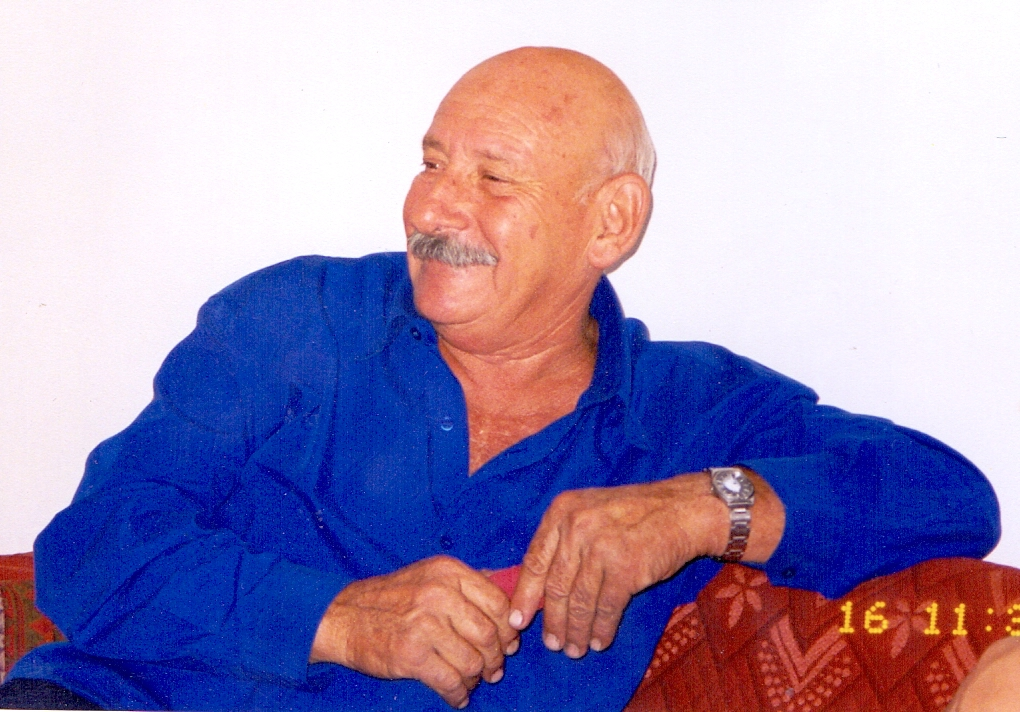
- Citizenship: Israel
- Occupation: Defense Force

Shlomo Baum (Hebrew: שלמה באום; June 21, 1928 – January 17, 1999) was an Israeli military commando fighter. He was one of the founders of Unit 101 of the Israel Defense Forces, where he served as Ariel Sharon's deputy in command.

== Biography ==
Baum lived in Abu Tor, the mixed Jewish-Arab neighborhood of Jerusalem.

Baum was known for his right-wing politics, his support of Israeli settlement in the territories captured by Israel in the Six-Day War, and for his opposition to territorial compromise.
