= Mordechai Maklef =

Israeli general

- מרדכי מקלף
- Mordechai Maklef
- Born: 19 January 1920; Motza, Jerusalem, Mandatory Palestine
- Died: 22 February 1978 (aged 58); Mainz, West Germany
- Military career
- Allegiance: United Kingdom (1942–1946); Israel (from 1948)
- Branch: Haganah; British Army (World War II); Israel Defense Forces
- Service years: 1932–1953
- Rank: Rav Aluf (highest rank); Chief of Staff
- Nickname: Motke
- Conflicts: Arab revolt in Palestine; World War II (North African campaign & Italian campaign); 1948 Arab–Israeli War (Operation Hiram)

Mordechai (Motke) Maklef (or Makleff) (Hebrew: מרדכי (מותקה) מקלף; 19 January 1920 – 22 February 1978) was the third Chief of Staff of the Israel Defense Forces (IDF) and later, director-general of many important public companies in the Israeli economy.

== Early life ==
Maklef was born in the village of Motza, near Jerusalem in the British Mandate of Palestine in 1920. His parents, Aryeh Leib and Batya Haya (born Chmersanky), were among the founders of this first modern village outside Jerusalem, located along the road to Jaffa. During the 1929 Palestine riots, inhabitants of the neighbouring Arab village of Qalunya attacked the Maklef home, which was located along the perimeter of Motza, and killed the entire family, except the young Mordechai, who managed to escape the massacre by jumping from a second story window. The murderers included a shepherd employed by the family and the local policeman, who was the only person in the area to own a gun. The murder shocked the Jewish population of Palestine, and was one of the most remembered events of the riots. With his immediate family now dead, Mordechai Maklef was raised by relatives in Jerusalem and Haifa.

== Military career ==
As a teen, Maklef was active in the Haganah and in Orde Wingate's Special Night Squads. With the outbreak of World War II, he enlisted in the British Army, serving in the Palestine Regiment and subsequently the Jewish Brigade. He served in the North African and Italian campaigns. He was commissioned from the rank of sergeant in July 1942 and became an officer, serving as a company commander in the Jewish Brigade's 2nd battalion during the Italian campaign. Upon his discharge from the British Army with the rank of major in August 1946, he remained in Europe, engaging in illegal Jewish immigration to Palestine and acquisition of arms for the emerging Jewish state. He later returned to Palestine and rejoined the Haganah.

During the 1948 Arab-Israeli War, Maklef fought in the Carmeli Brigade, as its senior operation officer and later as brigade commander, leading Jewish forces in the battle of Haifa (Note: Pappé 2006) and in operations near Acre. He also took part in Operation Hiram, in which Jewish forces captured the entire Galilee region for Israel.

Court documents revealed in 2026 showed that Maklef had testified about the 1948 Palestinian expulsions that "There were operations in which the potential enemy, namely civilians, was annihilated. In Safsaf, Jish, Ilaboun, Lod, Ramle and in the south, on a large scale. The intention was to expel. It is impossible to expel 114,000 people who lived [in the Galilee] without terror. There had to have been an element of initial terror for them to leave."

After the war, he headed the Israeli delegation to talks with Lebanon and Syria. In November 1949, he was appointed Deputy Chief of Staff to Yigael Yadin and senior operations officer of the IDF. Following Yadin's resignation in 1952, Makleff, then just 32 years old, was appointed to replace him as Chief of Staff. He agreed to accept the position for a period of one year only. His tenure as Chief of Staff was marked by his battles with the Ministry of Defence, and in particular with Shimon Peres. David Ben-Gurion commented in his diary "I had the clear impression that M. suffered from an inferiority complex and suspected that his authority was being undermined". Maklef resigned on 11 October 1953, after repeated demands that relations between the army and the Ministry of Defence be reformed.

During that time, Israel was faced with increasing attacks from fedayeen, Palestinian raiders from the West Bank and Gaza Strip, who attacked Israeli border settlements. In response to this, Maklef appointed Major Ariel Sharon to form a commando unit to attack the fedayeen bases across the border and put an end to the attacks on Israeli civilians. Sharon, in turn, created Unit 101, which conducted a lengthy series of retaliatory raids throughout 1953, when it was merged into the Paratroopers Brigade.

He was also responsible for the establishing of Unit 131 which set up clandestine cells in Arab states to be activated in the event of war. A year later, the cell in Egypt was exposed in events that led to the Lavon Affair.

== Civilian career ==
On 7 December 1953, exactly one year after he assumed the position, Maklef resigned as Chief of Staff. He went on to serve in a number of key positions in the Israeli public sector. From 1955 to 1968, he was Director General of the Dead Sea Works, developing the local phosphate industry in that region. He also served as Director General of the Citrus Marketing Board and Israel Chemicals.

Maklef died from a heart attack in Germany in 1978, and was buried in the military cemetery in Kiryat Shaul, Israel.
