= Unit 101 =

Former special forces unit of the Israel Defense Forces

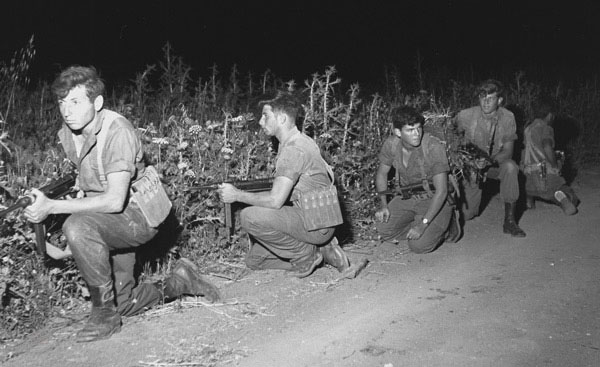
- Unit 101 in 1954
- Active: August 1953 – January 1954
- Disbanded: January 1954
- Country: Israel
- Branch: Israeli Ground Forces
- Type: Sayeret
- Size: 50
- Garrison/HQ: Tel Aviv, Israel.
- Engagements: Bureij; Qibya massacre

Commanders
- Notable commanders: Ariel Sharon; Meir Har-Zion

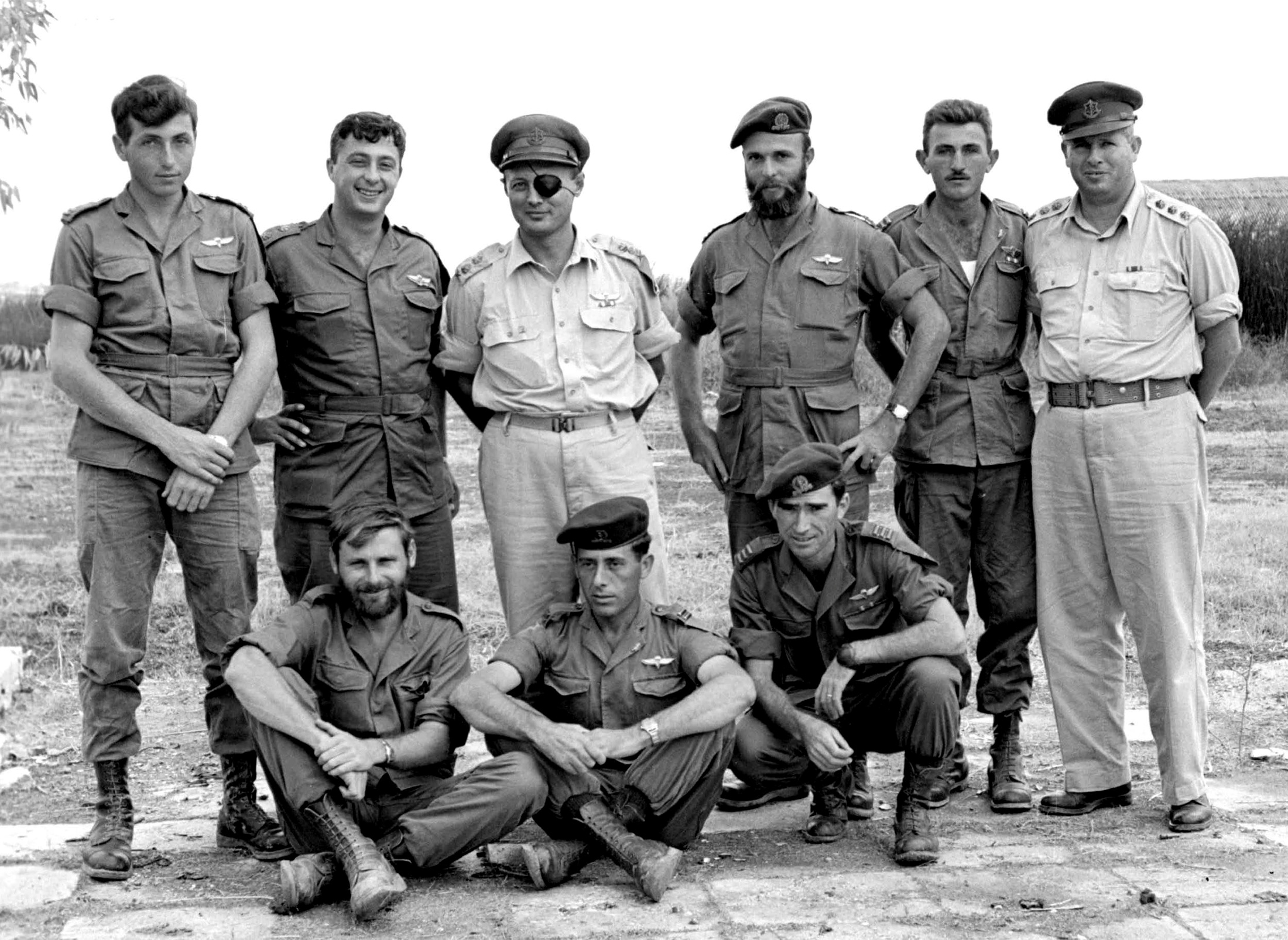
Various Israeli officers of the Paratrooper Battalion 890 in 1955 with Moshe Dayan (standing, third from the left). Unit 101 merged with Paratrooper Battalion 890 upon disbandment. Meir Har-Zion is standing, first from the left and Ariel Sharon is standing, second from the left.

Commando Unit 101 (Hebrew: יחידה 101) was a sayeret (commando) unit of the Israel Defense Forces (IDF), founded and commanded by Ariel Sharon on orders from Prime Minister David Ben-Gurion in August 1953. They were armed with non-standard weapons and tasked with carrying out retribution operations across the state's borders—in particular, establishing small unit maneuvers, activation and insertion tactics.

Members of the unit were recruited only from agricultural kibbutzim and moshavim. Membership in the unit was by invitation only, and any new member had to be voted on by all existing members before they were accepted.

The unit was merged into the 890th Paratroop Battalion during January 1954, on orders of General Moshe Dayan, Chief of Staff, because he wanted their experience and spirit to be spread among all infantry units of IDF starting with the paratroopers. They are considered to have had a significant influence on the development of subsequent Israeli infantry-oriented units.

== Background ==
Following the 1948 Arab–Israeli War, Israel was faced with cross-border raids and infiltrations by Arab militants and non-militants respectively. Many of these were small scale infiltrations that consisted of unarmed Palestinian refugees attempting to rejoin their families and of smugglers bringing in contraband for Israeli markets. These were later followed with attacks launched by refugees often motivated by economic reasons, but they were quickly adopted by the military of the neighboring Arab states, who organized them into semi-formal brigades which mounted larger scale operations from 1954 onwards. According to Israel, about 9,000 attacks were launched from 1949 to 1956, resulting in hundreds of Israeli civilian casualties.

At the same time the IDF was ill-prepared to respond to these raids. The Palmach, its three best combat units of the 1948 war, had been disbanded at Ben-Gurion's instruction. Many experienced officers had left the army after the war, and Israeli society had undergone a difficult period of impoverishment. As a result, the IDF did not have any units capable of effective reprisal, and did not perform well in offensive operations.

The Palestinians must learn that they will pay a high price for Israeli lives.

— A conversation between David Ben-Gurion and Ariel Sharon.

As a response to this problem the IDF formed Unit 30 in 1951—a secret unit that belonged to the IDF Southern Command. Their purpose was to execute retribution missions while operating in compact and well-trained teams. Unfortunately for the IDF the officers lacked the required training and executed their duties poorly, leading to the unit's disbandment in 1952.

One of Sharon's final operations before leaving the army in 1952 was the semi-successful Operation Bin Nun Alef into Jordan. During the operation he suffered serious injuries, after which Sharon had recommended to the General Staff that an elite force, trained in commando tactics, be set up for reprisal operations. After a series of unsuccessful retribution infiltrations by existing IDF units, Ben Gurion pressed Chief of Staff Mordechai Maklef to establish such a special forces unit in the summer of 1953. This was Israel's first, and reservist Ariel Sharon was recalled to duty.

Sharon was given the rank of Major and chosen to command the company-sized unit, with Shlomo Baum as deputy in command. The unit was to consist of 50 men, most of them former Tzanhanim and Unit 30 personnel. They were armed with non-standard weapons and tasked with carrying out special reprisals across the state's borders—mainly establishing small unit maneuvers, activation and insertion tactics that are utilized even today.

The new unit began a hard process of day and night training. Some of their exercises frequently took them across the border, as enemy engagement was seen as the best preparation. The recruits went on forced marches and undertook weapons and sabotage training at their base camp at Sataf, a depopulated Arab village just west of Jerusalem.

In addition to the unit's tactical variation, they were also unique in two ways:

- They were first IDF Special Forces unit formed from scratch, rather than modify a previously existing infantry oriented unit—such as with the Golani Brigade Special Reconnaissance Platoon.
- No other unit ever before received its orders directly from the IDF General Staff—the IDF High Command MATKAL, rather than from a lower sub-command.

Originally T'zanhanim (Hebrew: הצנחנים, Paratroopers) company's officers were the biggest opposition against the creation of Unit 101. The reason for this was simply that they didn't want another competitor for retaliation missions. Before the formation of Unit 101 only they undertook these missions. One of the unit's tactical commanders was Meir Har-Zion, who was later awarded the rank of an officer solely for his conduct in battle. The tactics of Unit 101 was politically very effective and soon the fighters simply could not keep up with the attrition.

This meant that the attacks on Israel decreased and the political objective of Unit 101 was accomplished. The creation of Unit 101 was a major landmark in the Israeli Special Forces history. Beside the Sayeret Matkal, they are considered to be the unit with the most influence on the Israeli infantry oriented units including both special and conventional units.

== Recruitment ==
Members of the unit were recruited exclusively from agricultural kibbutzim and moshavim, with the view that only those who were raised as farmers on the land had the spirit to defend it. Membership in the unit was by invitation only, and any new member had to be voted on by all existing members before they were accepted.

== Operations ==
=== Palestinian refugee camp ===
According to Yoav Gelber, after one month of training a patrol of Unit 101 infiltrated into the Gaza Strip as an exercise. Some sources estimate that a result of the infiltration was 20 killed Arabs. Unit 101 suffered two wounded soldiers. The raid was heavily condemned by foreign observers, who called it "an appalling case of deliberate mass murder", and was publicly criticized in the Israeli cabinet by at least one minister.

=== Qibya massacre ===
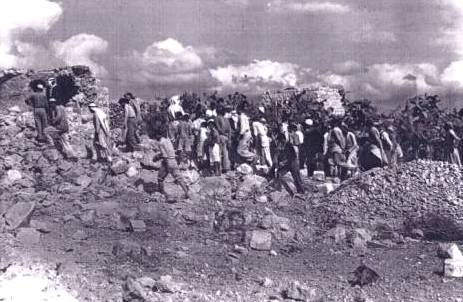
Inhabitants of Qibya coming back to their village after the attack

Two months later, in October, the unit was involved in the raid into the village of Qibya in the northern West Bank, then a part of Jordan. During this operation that inflicted heavy damage on the Arab Legion forces in Qibya 42 villagers were killed, and 15 wounded. According to United Nations observers, bullet-riddled bodies near the doorways and multiple bullet hits on the doors of the demolished houses indicated that the inhabitants may have remained inside until their homes were blown up over them.

The international outcry caused by the operation required a formal reply by Israel. The Israelis denied responsibility, claiming that Israeli settlers or a local kibbutz had carried out the raid on their own initiative.

== Disbandment ==
After realizing the huge success of Unit 101, the Chief of Staff, General Moshe Dayan decided that the experience gained by it must be shared with all IDF infantry units starting with the Paratroopers Battalion 890. This was done by merging the two together under the command of Ariel Sharon who was then promoted to the rank of Lt. Colonel. After the merger and the addition of a Nachal Mutznach ("airborne Nachal") battalion, the combined outfit turned into a brigade size unit, named Brigade 202 (now the 35th Paratroopers Brigade). Sharon became the commander of the merged brigade which was now composed of two battalions—890 and 88 and a few months later joined by reserve battalion 771 which included ex-101 members together with reserve paratroopers and Nachal paratroopers.

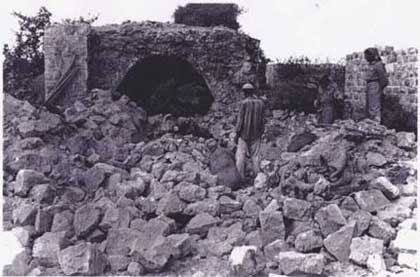
A resident of Qibya at the ruins of his house after the attack by Israeli forces in October 1953

The merge with Tzanhanim company was actually ironic since their officers were originally the biggest opposition against the creation of Unit 101. This was because they didn't want a competitor for retaliation missions. Before the formation of Unit 101 only they undertook these missions.

Operating within the brigade, they carried out a large-scale attack on the Egyptian army positions in the Gaza strip during February 1955. Sharon personally led the raid, codenamed Operation Black Arrow. It resulted in 42 Egyptian soldiers killed and 36 wounded, versus 8 Israeli dead. The newly formed brigade did most of the Israeli special forces operations during the remainder of the 1950s.

Egyptian shock over the magnitude of their losses is often cited as one of the catalysts for the Soviet-Egyptian arms deal that opened the Middle East to the Soviet Union. Up to 20 such attacks were carried out between 1955 and 1956, culminating in the Qalqilya Police raid of October 1956. This particular raid targeted a position of the Jordanian Arab Legion in one of the old British police forts, during which 18 Israeli soldiers and up to a hundred Legionnaires were killed.

During the end of the 1950s the IDF realized that they were lacking a small SF unit, since the Tzanhanim company had turned into an infantry brigade. That is the main reason why Avraham Arnan formed the Sayeret Matkal in 1958. In various ways the Sayeret Matkal combined the operational experience gathered by Unit 101 and utilised the structure of the British Special Air Service. After losing their special forces title, the Tzanhanim company formed its own SF unit—the Sayeret Tzanhanim in October 1958.

== See also ==
- Ariel Sharon
- List of special forces units
- Meir Har-Zion
- Sayeret
- Special Air Service
