= Qibya massacre =

1953 killing of 69 Palestinian civilians by Israeli forces

Operation Shoshana
- Part of the Palestinian Fedayeen insurgency and the Israeli reprisal operations
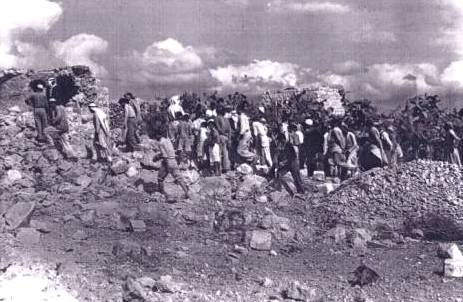
- Palestinian villagers returning to the village of Qibya after the Israeli massacre

- Qibya massacre (Israel)
- Location: 31°58′39″N 35°00′35″E; Qibya, West Bank
- Date: October 14, 1953; 73 years ago
- Target: Palestinian Arabs
- Attack type: Mortar and dynamite attack
- Deaths: 69 Palestinian civilians
- Perpetrator: Israel Defense Forces: Unit 101; Ariel Sharon
- Motive: Retaliation for the Yehud attack cited as motive by the Israeli government

The Qibya massacre occurred during Operation Shoshana, an Israeli reprisal operation that occurred in October 1953, when IDF's Unit 101 led by future Israeli prime minister Ariel Sharon attacked the village of Qibya in the West Bank, which was then under Jordanian control, and killed more than 69 Palestinian civilians, two-thirds of whom were women and children.

Forty-five houses, a school, and a mosque were destroyed. Ariel Sharon wrote in his diary that "Qibya was to be an example for everyone," and that he ordered "maximal killing and damage to property". Post-operational reports speak of breaking into houses and clearing them with grenades and shooting.

The attack followed cross-border raids from the West Bank. Israel framed the Qibya massacre as a response to the Yehud attack, in which an Israeli woman and her two children were killed.

The massacre was condemned by the U.S. State Department, the UN Security Council, and by Jewish communities worldwide. The State Department described the raid as "shocking" and used the occasion to confirm publicly that economic aid to Israel had been suspended previously, for other non-compliance regarding the 1949 Armistice Agreements.

== Background ==
Historian Benny Morris writes that "During 1948–49, most of the infiltrators crossed the borders to harvest crops left behind, to plant new crops in their abandoned lands, or to retrieve goods. Many others came to resettle in their old villages or elsewhere inside Israel, or to visit relatives, or simply to get a glimpse of their abandoned homes and fields. During the following years the vast majority came to steal crops, irrigation pipes, farm animals, or other property belonging to settlers, or to graze their flocks. [...] Others moved through Israeli territory in order to reach other Arab countries, most frequently from the Gaza Strip to the West Bank. Most of the infiltrators were unarmed individuals, though it appears that the proportion who came armed and in groups steadily increased after 1950."

Half of Jordan's prison population at the time consisted of people arrested for attempting to return to, or illegally enter, Israeli territory, but the number of complaints filed by Israel over infiltrations from the West Bank show a considerable reduction, from 233 in the first nine months of 1952, to 172 for the same period in 1953, immediately before the attack. This marked reduction was in good part the result of increased Jordanian efficiency in patrolling. Between June 1949 and the end of 1952, a total of 57 Israelis, mostly civilians, were killed by Palestinian infiltrators from the Jordanian West Bank. The Israeli death toll for the first nine months of 1953 was 32. Over roughly the same time (November 1950 – November 1953), the Mixed Armistice Commission condemned Israeli raids 44 times. For the same period, 1949–1953, Jordan maintained that it alone suffered 629 killed and injured from Israeli incursions and cross-border bombings. UN sources for the period, based on the documentation at General Bennike's disposal (prepared by Commander E H Hutchison USNR), lower both estimates.

Over the year leading up to the raid, Israeli forces and civilians had conducted many punitive expeditions, causing destruction of infrastructure and crops and many civilian casualties against Palestinian villages, with Latrun, Falameh (Falāma, Falamya), Rantis, Qalqiliya, Khirbet al-Deir, Khirbet Rasm Nofal, Khirbet Beit Emin, Qatanna, Wadi Fukin, Idhna, and Surif being the most notable examples. Meanwhile, Palestinian guerilla raids into Israel continued. Over a two-week period in late May and early June, four raids by Palestinian fedayeen killed 3 and wounded 6 people in Israel, at Beit Arif, Beit Nabala, Tirat Yehuda and Kfar Hess which, according to the UN, greatly concerned both the Israeli and Jordanian governments.

The specific incident which the Israeli government used to justify its assault on Qibya occurred on 12 October 1953, when a Jewish woman, Suzanne Kinyas, and her two children were killed by a grenade thrown into their house in the Israeli town of Yehud, some 10 kilometers (6 mi) inside of the Green Line. The attack initially drew a sharp rebuke to Jordan from the Mixed Armistice Commission. The Israeli government immediately claimed that the killings were perpetrated by Palestinian infiltrators, a charge queried by Jordanian officials, who were skeptical, and who offered to collaborate with Israel in order to apprehend the guilty parties, whoever and wherever they were. Moshe Sharett said later that "the Commander of the Jordan Legion, Glubb Pasha, had asked for police bloodhounds to cross over from Israel to track down the Yahud attackers". On the other hand, some weeks later, while assisting a United Nations and Jordanian team following the tracks of the person(s) who on 1 November had blown up a water-line in Jordanian territory supplying the Arab quarter of Jerusalem, tracks that led to the Scopus fence, the Israeli inspector delegated to the team denied them permission to enter the Jewish area around Mount Scopus and prosecute their investigation. For the first time, Israel accepted Jordan's offer of assistance and the tracks of the perpetrator were traced to a point 1400m over the border, to a road near Rantis, but dried up there. The United Nations observer team's investigation failed to find any evidence indicating who committed the crime, and the Jordanian delegate to the Mixed Commission condemned the act in strong language on 14 October. The Chief of Staff of the Arab Legion in Amman flew to Jerusalem to ask that no retaliatory actions take place that might compromise Jordanian investigations underway on their side of the border.

According to the former Time correspondent to Jerusalem, Donald Neff: "Force had to be used to demonstrate to the Arabs that Israel was in the Middle East to stay, Ben Gurion believed, and to that end he felt strongly that his retaliatory policy had to be continued."

Defense Minister Pinhas Lavon gave the order, in coordination with Prime Minister David Ben-Gurion. The Israeli elected governing cabinet was not informed, and though Minister of Foreign Affairs Moshe Sharett was privy to prior deliberations on whether or not such a punitive raid ought to be conducted, he expressed strong disapproval of the proposal, and was deeply shocked when informed of the outcome.

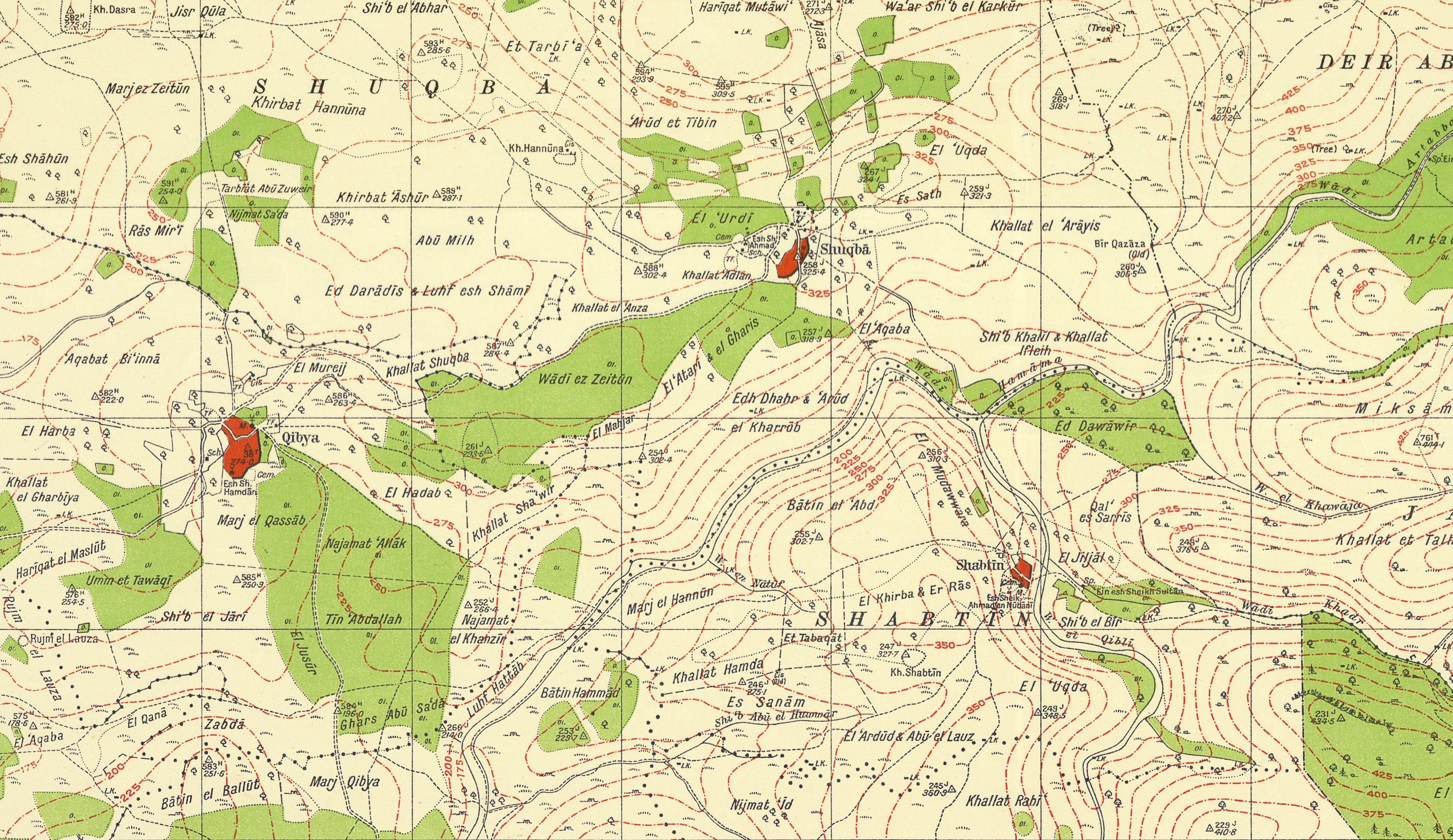
Qibya 1944 1:20,000

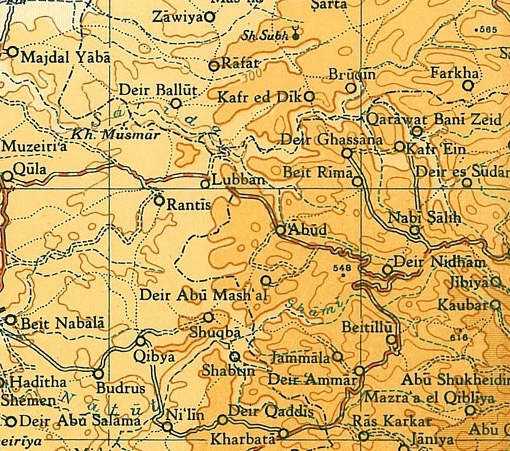
Qibya 1945 1:250,000

== The attack ==
According to the Mixed Armistice Commission report, approved on the afternoon immediately following the operation, and delivered by Major General Vagn Bennike to the UN Security Council, the raid at Qibya took place on the evening of 14 October 1953 at around 9.30 pm, and was taken by roughly half a battalion strength of soldiers from the Israeli regular army. Later sources state the force consisted of 130 IDF troops of whom a third came from Unit 101. The American chairman of the Mixed Armistice Commission in his report to the UN Security Council estimated that between 250 and 300 Israeli soldiers were involved in the attack. The raid was personally led by future Israeli Prime Minister Ariel Sharon, who at the time was a Major in the IDF and the commander of Unit 101.

The attack began with a mortar barrage on the village until Israeli forces reached the outskirts of the village. Israeli troops employed Bangalore torpedoes to breach the barbed-wire fences surrounding the village, and mined roads to prevent Jordanian forces from intervening. At the same time at least 25 mortar shells were fired into the neighbouring village of Budrus. The Israeli troops simultaneously entered the village from three sides. IDF soldiers encountered resistance from soldiers and village guards, and in the gunbattle that followed, 10–12 soldiers and guards defending the village were killed and an Israeli soldier was lightly wounded. Military engineers dynamited dozens of buildings across the village, killing scores of civilians. In the words of historian Rashid Khalidi, the operation “blew up forty-five homes with their inhabitants inside." At dawn, the operation was considered complete, and the Israelis returned home.

Ariel Sharon later wrote in his diary that he had received orders to inflict heavy damage on the Arab Legion forces in Qibya: "The orders were utterly clear: Qibya was to be an example for everyone." Original documents of the time showed that Sharon personally ordered his troops to achieve "maximal killing and damage to property", and post-operational reports speak of breaking into houses and clearing them with grenades and shooting. UN observers noted that they observed bodies near doorways, and bullet marks on the doors of demolished houses, and later concluded that residents might have been forced by heavy fire to stay in their homes.

== International reaction ==
An emergency meeting of the Mixed Armistice Commission (MAC) was held in the afternoon of 15 October and a resolution condemning the regular Israel army for its attack on Qibya, as a breach of article III, paragraph 2,62/ of the Israel-Jordan General Armistice Agreement was adopted by a majority vote.

The UN Security Council subsequently adopted Resolution 100 on 27 October 1953. On 24 November, the UN Security Council passed Resolution 101 and expressed the "strongest possible censure of this action."

The attack was universally condemned by the international community. The U.S. State Department issued a bulletin on 18 October 1953, expressing its "deepest sympathy for the families of those who lost their lives" in Qibya as well as the conviction that those responsible "should be brought to account and that effective measures should be taken to prevent such incidents in the future." The State Department described the raid as "shocking", and used the occasion to confirm publicly that economic aid to Israel had been previously suspended. The aid, as Israel had been informed on 18 September, had been "deferred" until Israel saw fit to cooperate with the United Nations in the Demilitarized Zone, in relation to its ongoing water diversion work near Bnot Ya'akov Bridge; that site had been chosen as the original location for the intake of Israel's National Water Carrier, but it would be moved downstream to the Sea of Galilee at Eshed Kinrot, following this US pressure.

== Israeli reaction ==
The international outcry caused by the operation required a formal reply by Israel. Intense discussions took place, and Moshe Sharett summed up, in his diary on 16 October, the opinion that:

Now the army wants to know how we (the Foreign Ministry) are going to explain the issue. In a joint meeting of army and foreign ministry officials Shmuel Bendor suggested that we say that the army had no part in the operation, but that the inhabitants of the border villages, infuriated by previous incidents and seeking revenge, operated on their own. Such a version will make us appear ridiculous: any child would say that this was a military operation. (16 October 1953)

Notwithstanding Sharett's advice that broadcasting this version would make Israel appear patently "ridiculous", on 19 October Ben-Gurion publicly asserted that the raid had been carried out by Israeli civilians.

None deplores it more than the Government of Israel, if ... innocent blood was spilled ... The Government of Israel rejects with all vigor the absurd and fantastic allegation that 600 men of the IDF took part in the action ... We have carried out a searching investigation and it is clear beyond doubt that not a single army unit was absent from its base on the night of the attack on Qibya. (Statement by Prime Minister David Ben-Gurion, ISA FM 2435/5)

On Israeli Radio that same day, Ben-Gurion addressed the nation, repeating the accusation that the massacre had been perpetrated by Israeli civilians:

The [Jewish] border settlers in Israel, mostly refugees, people from Arab countries and survivors from the Nazi concentration camps, have, for years, been the target of (...) murderous attacks and had shown a great restraint. Rightfully, they have demanded that their government protect their lives and the Israeli government gave them weapons and trained them to protect themselves. But the armed forces from Transjordan did not stop their criminal acts, until [the people in] some of the border settlements lost their patience and after the murder of a mother and her two children in Yahud, they attacked, last week, the village of Kibya across the border, that was one of the main centers of the murderers' gangs. Every one of us regrets and suffers when blood is shed anywhere and nobody regrets more than the Israeli government the fact that innocent people were killed in the retaliation act in Kibya. But all the responsibility rests with the government of Transjordan that for many years tolerated and thus encouraged attacks of murder and robbery by armed powers in its country against the citizens of Israel.

Israeli historian Avi Shlaim observed that the official Israeli version was not believed, and it did nothing to reduce the damage to Israel's image. "This was not Ben-Gurion's first lie for what he saw as the good of his country, nor was it to be the last, but it was one of the most blatant."

Sharon later claimed that he had "thought the houses were empty" and that the unit had checked all houses before detonating the explosives. In his autobiography Warrior (1987) Sharon wrote:

I couldn't believe my ears. As I went back over each step of the operation, I began to understand what must have happened. For years Israeli reprisal raids had never succeeded in doing more than blowing up a few outlying buildings, if that. Expecting the same, some Arab families must have stayed in their houses rather than running away. In those big stone houses [...] some could easily have hidden in the cellars and back rooms, keeping quiet when the paratroopers went in to check and yell out a warning. The result was this tragedy that had happened.

Uri Avnery, founder and editor of the magazine HaOlam HaZeh, relates that he had both his hands broken when he was ambushed for criticizing the massacre at Qibya in his newspaper.

== Results ==
According to Daniel Byman, the attack, "controversial, brutal, and bloody – worked," leading Jordan to arrest more than a thousand fedayeen and stepped up its patrolling of the border.

Following the attack, the Arab Legion deployed soldiers on the border segment near Qibya to stop further infiltrations and deter further Israeli incursions. There was a brief overall reduction in incursions along the border.

After this incident, Israel restricted attacks on civilian targets. Despite the U.S. request that those involved be brought to account, Sharon was not prosecuted. The independence of Unit 101 was cancelled and several weeks later it was dismantled altogether.

Defense Minister Pinhas Lavon's words to the General Staff in July 1954 were, "Guys, you have to understand [that] there can be the greatest and most successful military operation, and it will turn into a political failure, meaning eventually a military failure as well. I'll give a simple example: Qibya."

== See also ==
- List of massacres in the Palestinian territories
- List of attacks against Israeli civilians before 1967

== Sources ==
- Ze'ev Schiff, Israel Army Lexicon
- The 1953 Qibya Raid Revisited: Excerpts from Moshe Sharett's Diaries
