= Qibya =

- Municipality type C

Arabic transcription(s)
  - Arabic: قبية
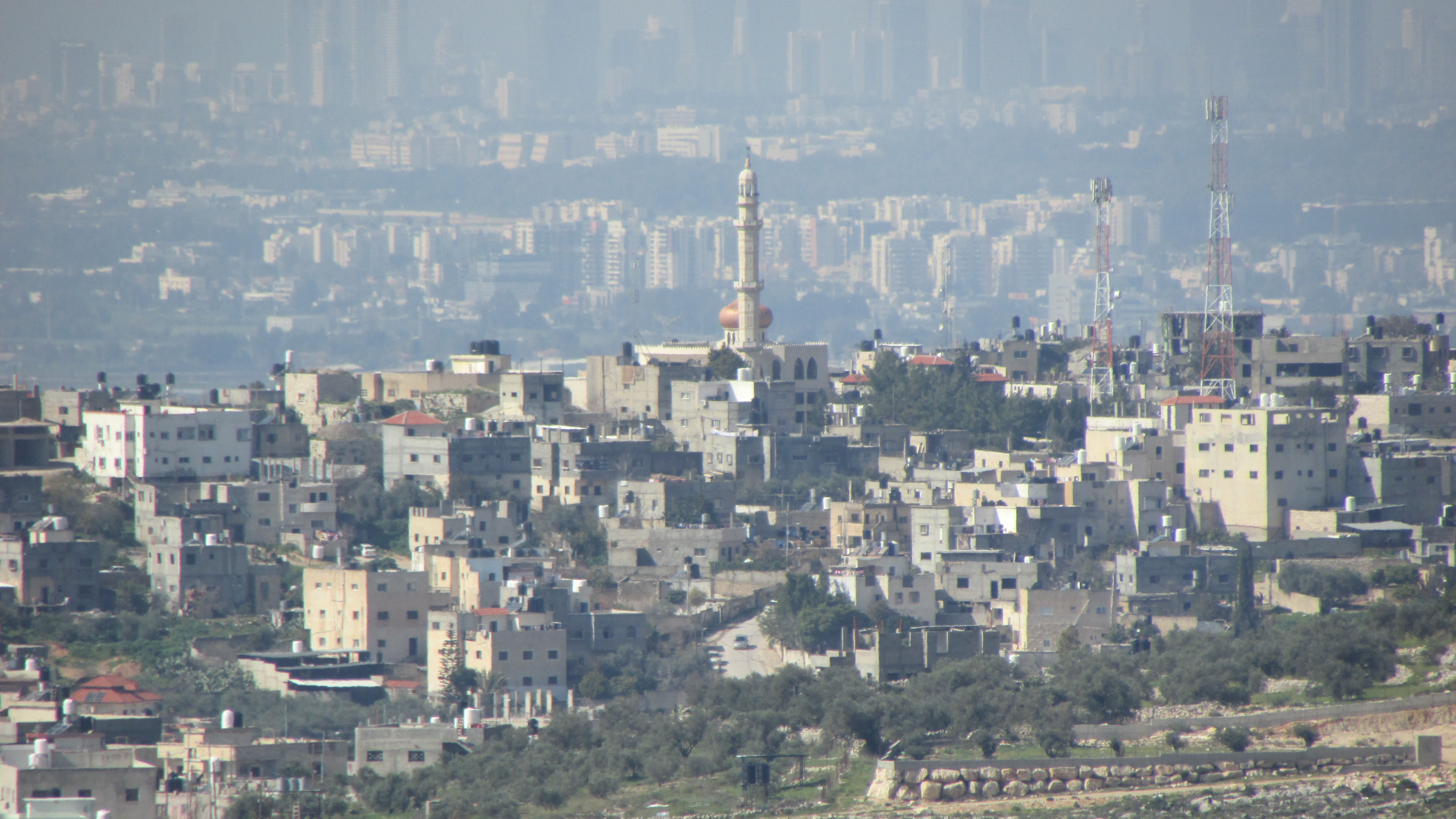
- Qibya

- Location of Qibya within Palestine
- Coordinates: 31°58′39″N 35°00′35″E
- Palestine grid: 151/153
- State: State of Palestine
- Governorate: Ramallah and al-Bireh

Government
  - Type: Municipality
  - Head of Municipality: Fahmi Makhtub

Area
  - Total: 16.5 km^{2} (6.4 sq mi)

Population (2017)
  - Total: 6,090
  - Density: 369/km^{2} (956/sq mi)
- Name meaning: Domed

Qibya (Arabic: قبية) is a Palestinian village in the West Bank, located 30 kilometers (19 mi) northwest of Ramallah and exactly north of the large Israeli city of Modi'in. It is part of the Ramallah and al-Bireh Governorate, and according to the Palestinian Central Bureau of Statistics, it had a population of approximately 6,090 in 2017.

The village is known for being the site of the 1953 Qibya massacre.

== Etymology ==
The name Qibyā is Aramaic, and means “The cistern”.

== Location ==
Qibya is located 19.9 kilometers (12.4 mi) (horizontally) northwest of Ramallah. It is bordered by Ni'lin to the east, Shuqba to the north, the Green line to the west, and Budrus and Ni'lin to the south.

== History ==
A Bar Kokhba Revolt coin dated to between 134 and 136 was found in a Karst cave near this village, suggesting that Jews who rebelled against the Roman Empire had found refuge in this cave. Potsherds from the Roman/Byzantine, Byzantine Empire, Mamluk and early Ottoman period have been found in the village.

A building, possibly dating to the Crusader era have been found here.

=== Ottoman period ===
Qibya, like the rest of Palestine, was incorporated into the Ottoman Empire in 1517, and in the census of 1596, the village was located in the Nahiya of Ramla of the Liwa of Gaza. It had an entirely Muslim population of 29 households. They paid a fixed tax rate of 25% on wheat, barley, summer crops, olives, fruit trees, lintels, goats and/or beehives, in addition of taxes for a press for olives or grapes; a total of 6,000 akçe.

According to Marom, in the 18th or early 19th centuries, residents of Qibya affiliated with the Yamani camp during the Qays and Yaman conflicts, alongside residents of Dayr Tarif and part of the residents of Bayt Nabala. They fought several skirmishes against rivals from Deir Abu Mash'al and Jayyous.

In 1882, the PEF's Survey of Western Palestine described the village (then named Kibbiah), as "a very small hamlet with olive-trees, on high ground".

=== British Mandate period ===
In the 1922 census of Palestine, conducted by the British Mandate authorities, the village, (named Kibbia), had a population of 694 inhabitants, all Muslims. In the 1931 census the population of Qibya was 909, still all Muslim, in 204 inhabited houses.

In the 1945 statistics, the population of Qibya was 1,250, all Muslims, who owned 16,504 dunams of land according to an official land and population survey. 4,788 dunams were used for cereals, while 32 dunams were built-up (urban) land.

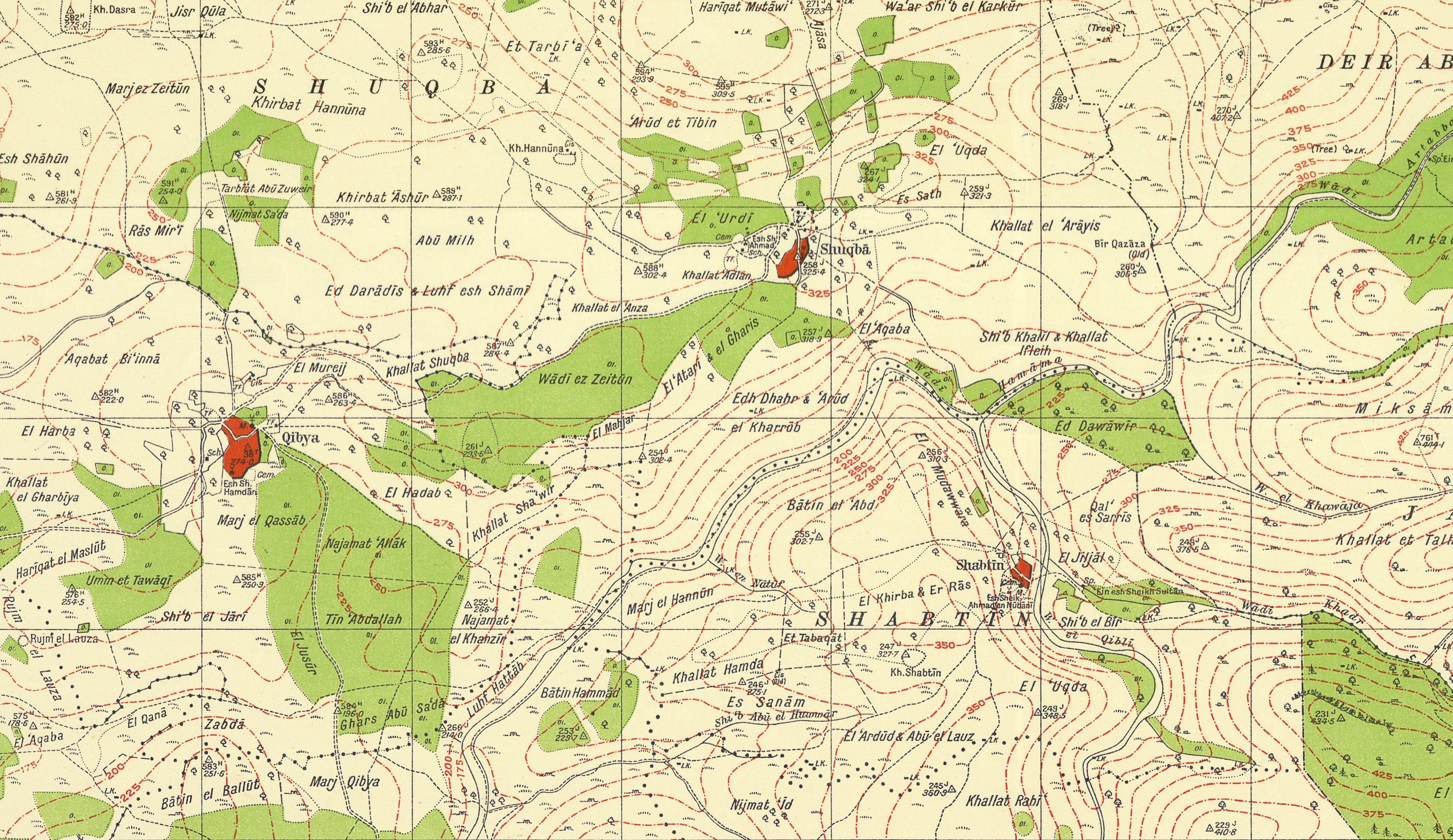
Qibya 1944 1:20,000

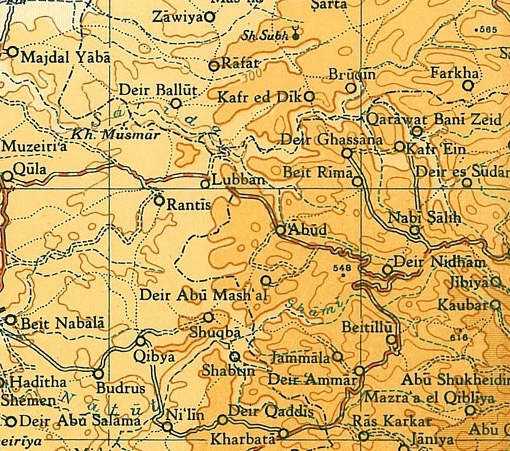
Qibya 1945 1:250,000

=== Jordanian era ===
In the wake of the 1948 Arab–Israeli War, and after the 1949 Armistice Agreements, Qibya came under Jordanian rule.

==== Massacre ====
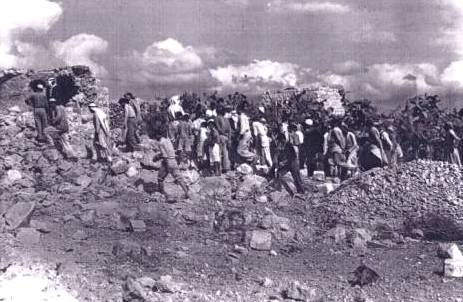
Villagers returning home after the 1953 massacre

In October 1953 Qibya was the target of an Israeli raid known as the Qibya massacre by Unit 101 commanded by a young Ariel Sharon which resulted in the death of 67 or 69 unarmed civilians and large-scale destruction of the village. On October 18, 1953, the U.S. State Department issued a bulletin expressing its "deepest sympathy for the families of those who lost their lives" in Qibya as well as the conviction that those responsible "should be brought to account and that effective measures should be taken to prevent such incidents in the future." The United States temporarily suspended economic aid to Israel.

The Jordanian census of 1961 found 1,635 inhabitants in Qibya.

=== Post-1967 ===
Since the Six-Day War in 1967, Qibya has been under Israeli occupation.

After the 1995 accords, 21.5% of Qibya land was classified as Area B, the remaining 78.5% as Area C. Israel has confiscated land from Qibya in order to construct the Israeli West Bank barrier.

Qibya received media coverage again in the run-up to the 2001 Israeli general election when it was correctly forecast that Sharon would become the next Israeli Prime Minister.

== Bibliography ==
- Barron, J.B., ed. (1923). Palestine: Report and General Abstracts of the Census of 1922. Government of Palestine.
- Conder, C.R.; Kitchener, H.H. (1882). The Survey of Western Palestine: Memoirs of the Topography, Orography, Hydrography, and Archaeology. Vol. 2. London: Committee of the Palestine Exploration Fund.
- Finkelstein, I.; Lederman, Zvi, eds. (1997). Highlands of many cultures. Tel Aviv: Institute of Archaeology of Tel Aviv University Publications Section. ISBN 965-440-007-3.
- Government of Jordan, Department of Statistics (1964). First Census of Population and Housing. Volume I: Final Tables; General Characteristics of the Population (PDF).
- Government of Palestine, Department of Statistics (1945). Village Statistics, April, 1945.
- Hadawi, S. (1970). Village Statistics of 1945: A Classification of Land and Area ownership in Palestine. Palestine Liberation Organization Research Center.
- Hütteroth, W.-D.; Abdulfattah, K. (1977). Historical Geography of Palestine, Transjordan and Southern Syria in the Late 16th Century. Erlanger Geographische Arbeiten, Sonderband 5. Erlangen, Germany: Vorstand der Fränkischen Geographischen Gesellschaft. ISBN 3-920405-41-2.
- Mills, E., ed. (1932). Census of Palestine 1931. Population of Villages, Towns and Administrative Areas. Jerusalem: Government of Palestine.
- Palmer, E.H. (1881). The Survey of Western Palestine: Arabic and English Name Lists Collected During the Survey by Lieutenants Conder and Kitchener, R. E. Transliterated and Explained by E.H. Palmer. Committee of the Palestine Exploration Fund.
- Pringle, D. (1997). Secular buildings in the Crusader Kingdom of Jerusalem: an archaeological Gazetter. Cambridge University Press. ISBN 0521-46010-7.
