= 1952 barrel incident =

Israeli weapon trafficking into Jordanian territory

Barrel incident
| Date | June 4 – July 10, 1952 |
| Location | Mandelbaum Gate and Jerusalem |
| Result | Barrel returned to Israel: Contents determined to be other than oil; Barrel unopened |

Belligerents
| (United Nations) UNTSO: HJK-I-MAC; Jordan | Israel |

Commanders and leaders
| (Belgium) Major General Bennett L. de Ridder (France) Commandant Delseries (United States) Lieutenant General William E. Riley | (Israel) Lieutenant Colonel Ramati |

Casualties and losses
| UN MAC Headquarters taken (returned) | 1 oil barrel seized (returned) |

The barrel incident was a 1952 incident involving the UN HJK-I-MAC, Israel and the Hashemite Kingdom of Jordan. It involved Israel allegedly smuggling weapons through Jordanian territory, violating the General Armistice Agreement by sending soldiers into no-man's land, and taking over the UN MAC headquarters with armed force.

== Background ==
The Mount Scopus area runs north and includes Mount of Olives, which overlooks the city of Jerusalem. After the 1948 Arab–Israeli War, Jordan had control of Mount Olives with exception of land containing the Hadassah Medical Center and Hebrew University of Jerusalem, which were under administration by the United Nations who allowed Israel to maintain police guards in these areas under UNTSO supervision.

Every two weeks, a convoy would cross from Jerusalem into Jordanian territory through Mandelbaum Gate to provide supplies and a change of guard to the Israeli police force.

== Incident ==
On June 4, during a regular convoy check, a UN guard dropped a test rod into an oil drum, which struck a metal object in the center, and was unable to reach the bottom. Commandant Delseries, the French UN observer in charge of the Scopus convoy checks, ordered the barrel off the truck and sent for tools to open it. The Israeli truck driver quickly sped off back into Jerusalem and left the barrel behind in no-man's land.

Before tools to open the barrel could be acquired, Israeli Lieutenant Colonel Ramati violated the General Armistice Agreement by moving with Israeli soldiers into no-man's land, demanding the return of the barrel, and ordering his soldiers roll it back to Jerusalem themselves. Firearms of the observing Jordanians were audibly cocked to which UN Guards and Observers attempted to de-escalate the situation by placing their feet on the barrel and refusing to allow the Israeli soldiers to roll it. MAC Chairman Major General Bennett L. de Ridder managed to defuse the situation by offering to bring the barrel back to UN MAC Headquarters and to hold it until a decision was made by UNTSO Chief of Staff Lieutenant General William E. Riley.

The barrel was taken back to UN MAC Headquarters in Jerusalem. General Riley, who was in New York City, granted permission for HJK-I-MAC to open the barrel on June 20 at 1230 Israel Standard Time (IST). On June 20 at 1200 IST, three Israeli officers, armed with pistols and supported by two Israeli soldiers, armed with Thompson submachine guns, stormed UN MAC Headquarters with the soldiers stationing themselves outside the door to the room containing the barrel. They claimed the right to do so as the headquarters were within Israeli territory. General de Ridder set up a guard of his own and communications watch, and the Israeli officers started taking all incoming calls.

US Captain John Schofield went home to get his camera. A scene was set in which Commandant Delseries attempted to reach for the lock of the door leading to the barrel room to which the Israeli guards would block him, and Schofield would take a picture of it. That was repeated to ensure good lighting. Upon hearing of that, Israeli Minister of Foreign Affairs Moshe Sharett issued an aide-mémoire demanding the replacement of all UN Staff involved.

The Israelis ultimately placed another lock on the barrel room door and stole the key to the UN MAC Headquarters, which was locked at night. Elmo H. Hutchison called Chairman of ISMAC Colonel Samuel Taxis, the senior United States officer present, when the Israelis refused Hutchison's request to leave the door open one night. Taxis managed to convince the Israelis to leave the door open, but they still retained the key to the headquarters.

When General Riley arrived he successfully demanded the withdrawal of the aide-mémoire for the photograph and condemned Israel both for crossing into no man's land and for taking over UN Headquarters. On July 10 at 0902 IST, the Israeli officers and soldiers were withdrawn from the building. Soon, General Riley arrived along with delegates from Israel and Jordan, and they crowded into the barrel room. To the surprise of the UN Staff, Riley did not order it opened but instead requested a dipping rod. The dipping rod was dropped into the barrel and did not go within six inches of the bottom, and when slanted towards the center, it struck an unknown object. That was repeated until General Riley determined that the barrel contained matter other than fuel oil, which violated manifest as an item not part of the convoy, and he ordered it returned to Israel.

== Aftermath ==
The Jordanians were incensed that Riley refused to open the barrel. He stated that the barrel was not part of the convoy since its contents were not part of the manifest and so General Riley essentially gave the Israelis a free pass to smuggle as they wished.

UN Headquarters was moved to Mandelbaum Gate, within no-man's land, to ensure the Israelis could not take it over in the future.

== See also ==
- Folke Bernadotte
