= City Line (Jerusalem) =

Boundary separating Israel and Jordan (1948–1967)

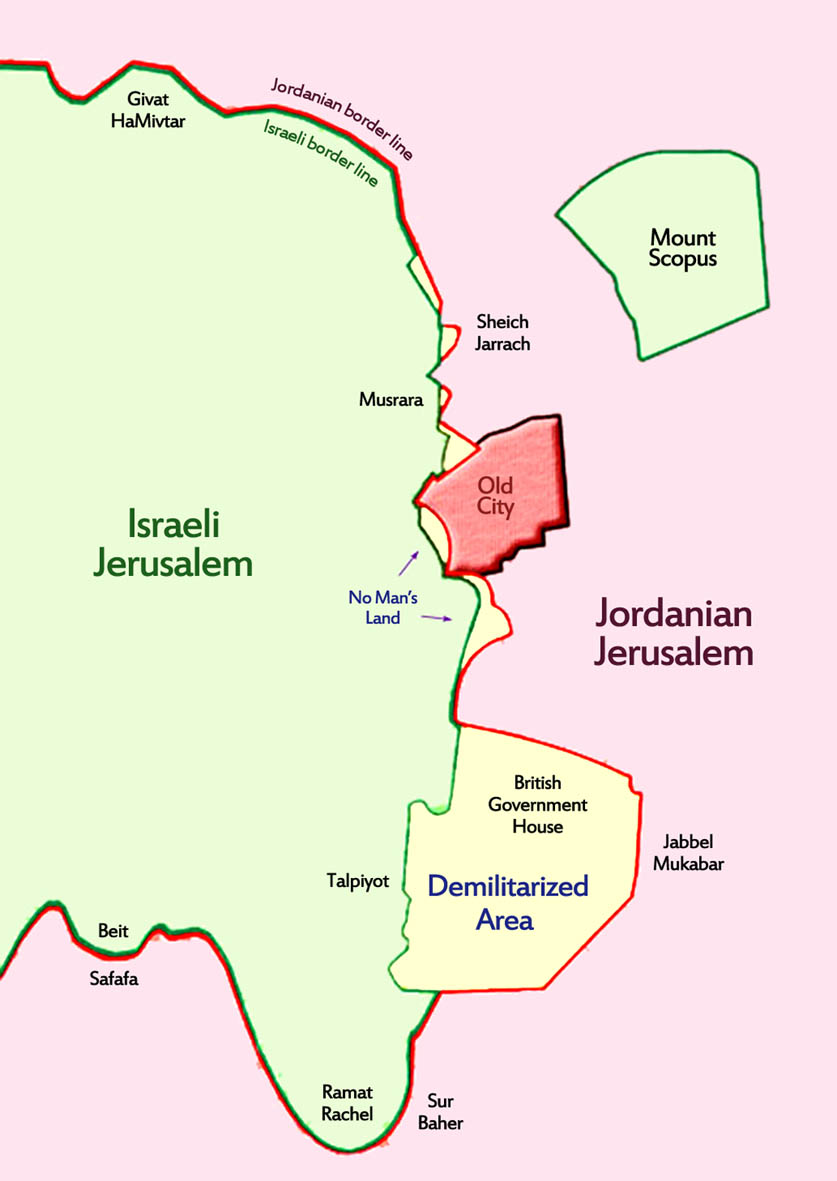
The "City Line" separating West Jerusalem (part of Israel) and East Jerusalem (part of Jordan) between 1948 and 1967. Jordan's half of Jerusalem included the Old City and the Israeli exclave of Mount Scopus. The "Demilitarized Area" surrounding the British Government House was controlled by the United Nations.

In Jerusalem, the "City Line" (Hebrew: הקו העירוני, romanized: HaKav HaIroni; Arabic: خط المدينة, romanized: Khaṭṭ al-Madīna) was a 7-kilometre (4.3 mi) segment of the Green Line that divided the city between Israel and Jordan as part of the 1949 Armistice Agreements, which ended the 1948 Arab–Israeli War. On one side was West Jerusalem, which was part of Israel, and on the other side was East Jerusalem, which was part of the Jordanian-annexed West Bank; East Jerusalem also included the Old City and the Israeli exclave of Mount Scopus. Additionally, a "Demilitarized Area" surrounding the British Government House was controlled by the United Nations. The City Line had numerous fortifications and obstacles on both sides, and various buildings in the city that were situated along the boundary were used as military posts. This arrangement was in place until the 1967 Arab–Israeli War, when Israel captured the entirety of Jerusalem. In 1988, six years before the Israel–Jordan peace treaty, the Jordanian government formally renounced the country's territorial claim to Jerusalem in favour of supporting the establishment of a Palestinian state, though the Jordanian Waqf continues to exercise authority over the Al-Aqsa Mosque compound in the Old City. Pursuant to the two-state solution laid out by the Oslo Accords, East Jerusalem has been sought by the Palestine Liberation Organization as the capital city of the State of Palestine.

== History ==
In November 30, 1948, after the end of the 1948 Arab–Israeli War in Jerusalem, Moshe Dayan, commander of the Israeli Etzioni Brigade, and Abdullah el-Tell, the Jordanian commander, met in an abandoned house in the Musrara neighborhood. The two parties reached agreement that day on a “complete and sincere ceasefire” covering Jerusalem and Mount Scopus. The two officers drew a map at the scale of 1:20,000, which outlined the boundaries of the ceasefire in Jerusalem. Dayan drew the positions under Israeli control with a green wax pencil line, and el-Tell used a red pencil to outline the positions under Jordanian control. The area between the two lines, along with the thickness of pencils that drew the two lines on the map, determined a "no man's land" between the lines. As the parties assumed that they were drawing a temporary ceasefire line, they attached no special significance to the inaccuracies and errors resulted from the thickness of the pencils, slight deviations in the drawings and segments of discontinuous lines, as well as places where the two lines overlapped.

A few months later, in April 1949 during the meetings in Rhodes over the 1949 Armistice Agreements at the end of the war, the Dayan and el-Tell map was found to be the only official document indicating the line dividing Jerusalem that was agreed upon by both parties. The inaccurate lines that were drawn loosely thus became a binding international border. The rough map lines had cut across neighborhoods, streets and houses, and were the source of many disputes between the two states. Along the lines, both sides came to hold positions and fortifications – some in residential and urban public institutions. In the no man's lands, landmines were deployed.

The entire Old City and the neighborhoods north of it, and the Mount of Olives, were in the Jordanian territories. The west of the city, as well as the Mount Scopus enclave in the north-east of the city was within the Israeli territories, where it included the campus of Hebrew University of Jerusalem opened in 1925 and the Hadassah Medical Center established in 1939, forcing both to relocate. The British Government House (Armon HaNetziv) area was a demilitarized zone controlled by the United Nations, and the house itself was determined to be the headquarters for UN observers. Between the two parts of the city was the Mandelbaum Gate. The crossing was managed by Jordanian and Israeli customs, and primarily served diplomats and UN personnel, as well as Christian pilgrims at Christmas. The crossing also oversaw a bi-weekly convoy to the Israeli enclave on Mount Scopus.

1961 map issued by the Jordanian tourism agency, showing its territory (yellow), Israel (hatched in red with no details shown), and a white no man's land along the City Line.

In West Jerusalem, neighborhoods along the line were considered dangerous, and became slum neighborhoods populated by indigents and characterized by poverty and neglect. These included the Shmuel HaNavi neighborhood, Mea Shearim, Musrara, Mamilla, and Yemin Moshe.

The city line divided Jerusalem for 19 years, until the Six-Day War in June 1967. At noon on June 5, 1967, the Jordanians occupied the British Government House from the UN, which marked the beginning of the ground fighting in Jerusalem. The same day, the Israeli Jerusalem Brigade (Brigade 16) captured the British house and the positions to its south. At dawn on June 6, the second day of the war, Israeli paratroop forces broke into the city line in the north, and proceeded to capture the neighborhoods north of the Old City, joining the isolated Mount Scopus. At noon on June 6, the Jerusalem Brigade broke the fences dividing the Abu Tor neighborhood, and the neighborhood conquest completed the encirclement of the Old City. The Old City fell to the IDF on June 7, 1967. Immediately upon the end of the war, fences and concrete walls dividing streets and neighborhoods were torn down, the fortifications were dismantled, and the mines were removed. Israeli sovereignty over East Jerusalem was established, and the two parts of the city were consolidated under the Israeli Jerusalem Municipality, which has made great efforts to obscure and hide the scars of the former city line.

The City line no longer exists as a political border, but in many ways it continues to exist to this very day, dividing the city along ethnic and cultural lines. It is commonly referred as the "Seam line", where the crossing of it is still felt, even in the absence of walls and fences.

== Outline ==
Route of the City line (Green Line) compared to the current municipal boundaries (in red)

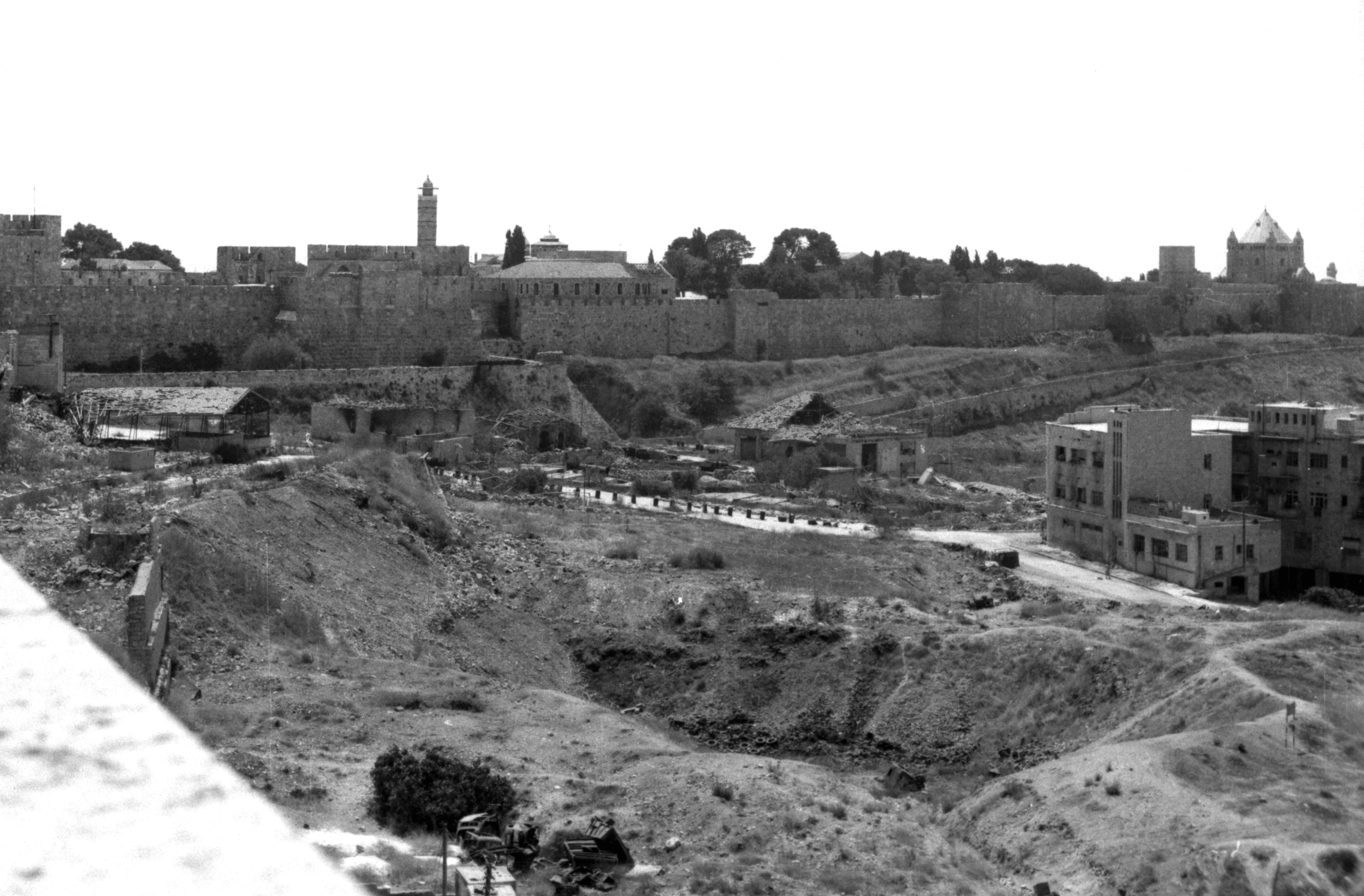
No Man's Land in Jerusalem, between Israel and Jordan. The photo (taken approx. 1964) depicts the Old City wall, Dormition Abbey (on the far right), and Tower of David (center-left). It was taken from the building of the geology department of the Hebrew University of Jerusalem, then located on Mamilla street.

The Green Line encircled Israeli Jerusalem (West Jerusalem) on the south, east and north in the form of a backwards "C". The southern side of the line crossed through the Arab village of Beit Safafa (today a neighborhood in Jerusalem), dividing it in two, separating clans, and leaving families on both sides of the border. From there it went eastward, encircling Kibbutz Ramat Rachel and separating it from the Arab village of Sur Baher, then it turned north, separating the eastern border of the Arnona and Talpiyot neighborhoods from the demilitarized No Man's Land. The future Diplomat Hotel's (former Ganey Yehuda Hotel) western corner would be within 100 metres (330 ft) of the line where it passes through the U.S. consular services building complex. East of Talpiyot, the line crosses the ridge containing the 1933 British Government House (Armon HaNetziv) in the demilitarized No Man's Land under UN auspices where the headquarters of UN observers who supervised the armistice was located. Continuing north, the line crossed through the Abu Tor neighborhood and divided it into two. Unlike in Beit Safafa, there were no Arabs left on the western side of the line; their homes were abandoned and later occupied by Jews, who lived very close to their Arab neighbors across the border.

From the Abu Tor ridge the line went down to the Hinnom Valley and Sultan's Pool, crossing through the remains of neighborhoods of Bete Shamaa and Jurat al Anab ("Hutzot Hayotzer"), on the way including in the Israeli territories Mount Zion, adjacent to the Old City on the south, but with no road leading to it. It was only in 1964 that Israel and Jordan jointly built the "Pope's Road" that connected western Jerusalem and Mount Zion, in honor of the visit of Pope Paul VI to the Holy Land. The Sultan's Pool was in no-man's-land, which bordered the houses of the Mishkenot Sha'ananim and Yemin Moshe neighborhoods. From there the line continued north, where it separated the western wall of the Old City (where the Jaffa Gate and the Tower of David are located) from the Mamilla neighborhood and the Jerusalem Old Town Hall. The historic Town Hall, which is located at the IDF Square has bullet holes as evidence of the conflicts at this location.

From the City Hall building the line paralleled the north-west section of the old city wall, where it separated the Christian Quarter in the north-west of the Old City from the religious institutions that were built by the Christians outside the wall in the "French compound": Saint-Louis Hospital and the Notre-Dame de Jérusalem. The line passed along the northern wall of the Old City past the New Gate to the Damascus Gate along what is now called Paratroopers Street, and then turned north through the Musrara houses along the route now known as the "Engineering Corps Road" and "Bar Lev Road". It is in this area where the Street of the Prophets was partitioned, where the central and western parts of the street were in Israeli territories, while the eastern part remained in Jordan. It separated the neighborhoods of Mea Shearim and Beit Yisrael on the Israeli side from the neighborhood of Husseini, the American Colony and Sheikh Jarrah on the Jordanian side. It is also in this area where the Mandelbaum Gate border crossing was agreed upon, which enabled the passage between the two parts of the city and the Israeli connection to its Mount Scopus enclave.

The northern section of the line, in the area of Jerusalem's contemporary neighborhoods of Ma'alot Dafna and Ramat Eshkol, passed between the neighborhoods of Shmuel HaNavi and Sanhedria on the Israeli side, and the Jordanian positions on Ammunition Hill, the Police Academy, and Givat HaMivtar. Near the line in that section is Sanhedria Cemetery, which was established by the Israelis as an alternative to the cemetery on Mount of Olives, which was controlled by the Jordanians after the 1948 Arab–Israeli War.

== Gallery ==
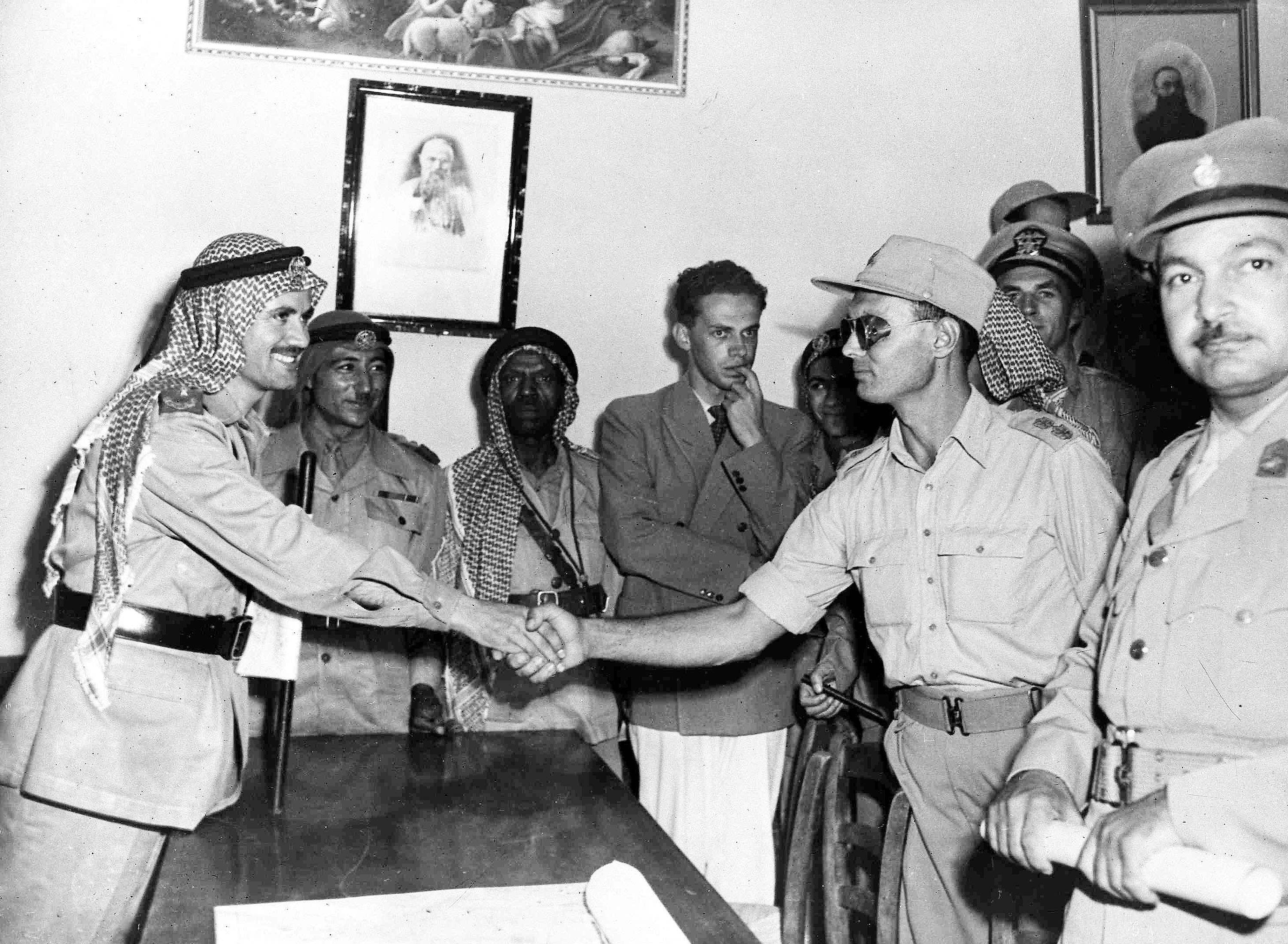
Moshe Dayan and Abdullah el Tell reach cease fire agreement, Jerusalem, 30 November 1948

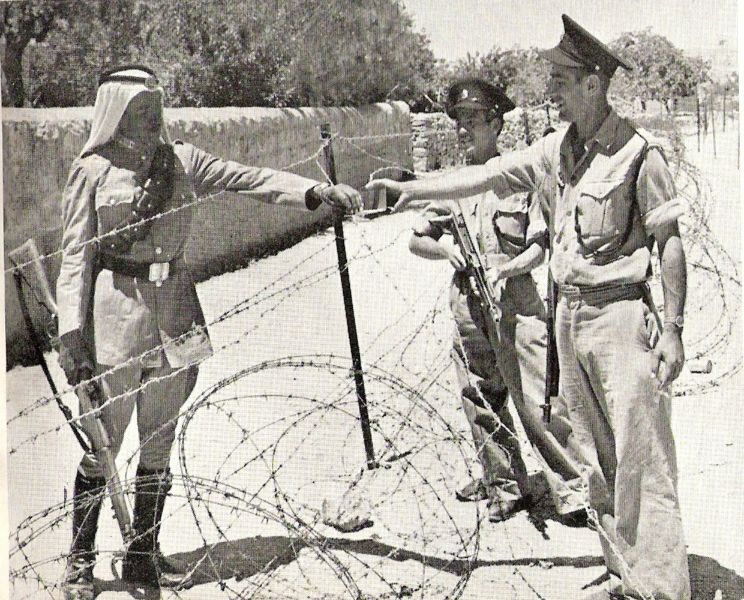
Israeli policemen meet a Jordanian legionnaire near the Mandelbaum Gate. Around 1950

A border sign in Jerusalem, 1951; in the background: Tower of David

Street scene on the Israeli side of the City Line, 1963: note the crude concrete walls behind

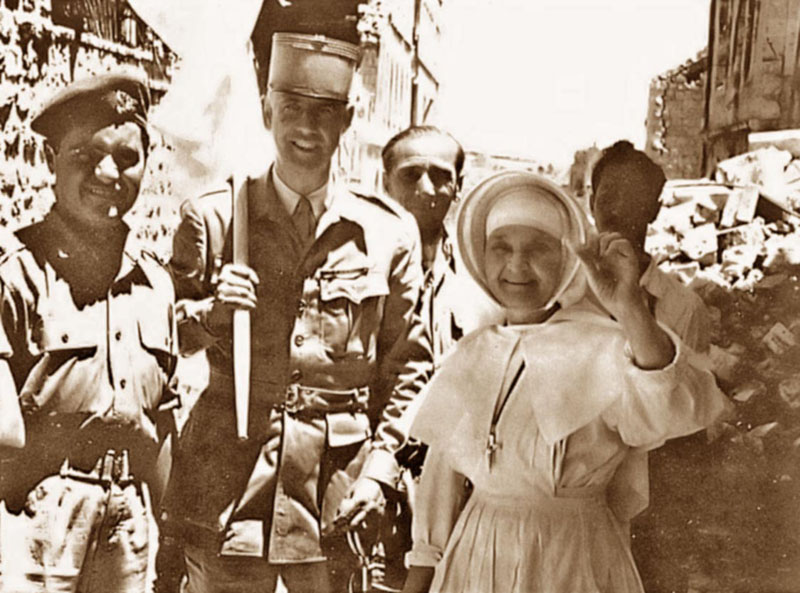
Light-hearted picture from LIFE, 1956: a Catholic nun helps to retrieve dentures that had fallen from a window into the No Man's Land along the Line

== See also ==
- Green Line (Israel)
- 1949 Armistice Agreements
- Israeli West Bank barrier
- West Jerusalem
- East Jerusalem
- Greater Jerusalem
