= Mixed Armistice Commissions =

United Nations organization that monitors ceasefire lines around Israel

The Mixed Armistice Commissions (MAC) is an organisation for monitoring the ceasefire along the lines set by the General Armistice Agreements. It was composed of United Nations Military Observers and was part of the United Nations Truce Supervision Organization peacekeeping force in the Middle East. The MAC comprised on four sections to monitor each of the four truce agreements, the Hashemite Kingdom of Jordan/Israel MAC, the Israel/Syrian MAC, the Israel/Lebanon MAC and the Egypt/Israel MAC. The various MACs were located on the cease fire lines and, through close liaison with headquarters in Jerusalem, were charged with supervising the truce, investigating border incidents, and taking remedial action to prevent the recurrence of such incidents.

== Background ==
From the Arab Israeli conflict the United Nations inaugurated the United Nations Truce Supervision Organization (UNTSO), this became the premier UN peacekeeping organization in the Middle East. It was clearly given a bi-fold mission which reads as follows: "first, to observe and report on the truce which was established on June 18, 1948, and, secondly, to maintain the organization of the Mixed Armistice Commissions (MAC).

Included in each General Armistice Agreement was a clause which provided for the creation of Mixed Armistice Commissions (MACs). The MACs were composed of an equal amount of representatives from the participating factions to the Armistices (one MAC for Israel and each of her bordering countries). UNTSO provided the chairman which was always its ranking member. In the same accord, UNTSO provided each MAC with a number of observers to detail the nature of complaints (regardless of which country who had lodged the grievance) in order to preserve the Truce. Logistic and administrative support grew within UNTSO as the observers were placed in remote locations. This requirement laid the foundation for UNTSO's existing support structure as we know it today.

UNTSO formed four separate Mixed Armistice Commissions (MACs). The Hashemite Kingdom of Jordan/Israel MAC and the Israel/Syrian MAC each had five members, while the Egypt/Israel MAC and Lebanon/Israel MAC had seven members. In the HKJ/I MAC and I/S MAC, each party designated two members, whereas in the I/E MAC and I/L MAC, each party designated three. The Chairman of each MAC was the United Nations Chief of Staff of the Truce Supervision Organization or a senior officer from the Observer personnel, appointed after consulting both parties. The Chairman also cast the deciding vote in any violation investigation. The observers' responsibilities consisted of investigating complaints brought by one or both parties, observe the ceasefires to theoretically supervise the execution of the provisions of the GAAs and to report to the UN. The partiality mechanism inherent in MAC voting soon damaged relations with both sides. UNTSO chairmen sided with one or other of the parties during an investigation, but they had no effective mechanism to sanction the guilty. UNTSO's role was simply to supply the UN with "adequate and objective information of such kind as may be required, rather than to enforce agreements or make peace."

The Military Observers (MOs') recorded tabulations and handed down judgements resulted in nothing concrete, not even shaming the parties in the court of world opinion. UNTSO's understaffed and unarmed investigators could not supervise, let alone enforce, the armistice agreements. Moreover, when the organization refused to consistently side with the Israeli version of events, its one common member obstructed the entire operation. For this reason, most Canadian MOs came to the region pro-Israeli, and departed pro-Arab. In spite of its questionable relevance UNTSO kept on, maintaining an international presence on the ground in Israel proper, nurturing a core group familiar with regional problems, and forming the proto-nuclei for inevitable future peacekeeping operations.

The MACs were very different from one another, bringing about four unique UNTSO peacekeeping missions. Disputes on the Israel-Syria Mixed Armistice Commission (ISMAC) centred on the most precious Middle Eastern commodity: water. In the period between 1949 and 1967, the Israel-Lebanon Mixed Armistice commission (ILMAC) was set up to continue marking the border under the observation of UNTSO. Contentions in the HKJIMAC concerned the divided city of Jerusalem, the Mount Scopus Israeli enclave in Jerusalem, Latrun and infiltration across the armistice demarcation line. The infiltration by Palestinians was initially unarmed groups crossing to regain possessions, harvest their crops or visit relatives; later infiltrations became armed individuals and then progressing into small retaliatory raids. As John Bagot Glubb explained:-

Some deep psychological urge which impels a peasant to cling to and die on his land. A great many of these wretched people are killed now, picking their own oranges and olives just beyond the line. The value of the fruit is often negligible. If the Jewish patrols see him he is shot dead on the spot, without questions. But they will persist in returning to their farms and gardens.

Israeli infiltration being organised retaliatory raids by military units such as Qibya and Nahhalin raids. Israel's frustration with the UN and the other parties led to their withdrawal from ISMAC in 1951 and HKJIMAC in 1954. The functioning of the Israel Lebanon MAC remained smooth due to the more relaxed attitude of the Israeli patrols towards returnees and infiltrators. Disputes with Egypt, who banned Israel-bound shipping from the Suez Canal and blockaded the Gulf of Aqaba, pertained to the al-Auja DMZ. By 1955, Israel ceased attending the Egyptian MAC and stepped up raids into the Gaza Strip and Sinai to which Egypt retaliated by sponsoring the Palestinian fedayeen (self-sacrificer) raids. The full-scale 1956 invasion of Egypt by British, French and Israeli forces, The invasion followed Egypt's decision of 26 July 1956 to nationalize the Suez Canal after the withdrawal of an offer by Britain and the United States to fund the building of the Aswan Dam.The invasion demonstrated UNTSO's irrelevance in the process.

== Headquarters ==
The overall headquarters of the UNTSO after moving from Cairo to Haifa ended up in Government House Jerusalem.

The Israel/Lebanon Mixed Armistice Commission (ILMAC) maintained its headquarters at the frontier post North of Metulla and the Lebanese frontier post at En Naqoura.

Hashemite Kingdom of Jordan/Israel Mixed Armistice Commission (HKJIMAC) maintained its headquarters (HQ) in the Jerusalem, after the "Barrel Incident" the HKJIMAC HQ was moved into the Demilitarised Zone (DMZ) close to the Mandelbaum Gate.

Israel/Syria Mixed Armistice Commission (ISMAC) maintained its headquarters at the Customs House near Jisr Banat Yakub and at Mahanayim.

Israel/Egyptian Mixed Armistice Commission maintained its headquarters at El Auja

== Local Area Commanders agreements ==
Mount Scopus Demilitarisation Agreement of 7 July 1948 the agreement was initialled by Franklyn M Begley a UN official, the local Jordanian commander and by the Israeli local commander

Mount Scopus Demilitarisation Agreement of 21 July 1948 Israeli and Jordanian local commanders with subsidiary agreement initialled by Franklyn M Begley and the local Jordanian commander but not by the Israeli commander.

== International Day of United Nations Peacekeepers ==
29 May has been designated as the "International Day of United Nations Peacekeepers" by the UN. 29 May 2008 being the sixtieth anniversary of United Nations Peacekeeping Forces being deployed.

Sixty years ago on that date, the United Nations Security Council established the first peacekeeping operation, the United Nations Truce Supervision Organization (UNTSO), based in the Middle East. In 2001, the General Assembly proclaimed 29 May as the International Day of United Nations Peacekeepers to pay tribute to the men and women who serve in United Nations peacekeeping operations and honour the memory of those who have lost their lives in the cause of peace.

=== First casualty ===
On 6 July 1948 the UN observers had their first casualty with the death of the French Observer Commandant Rene Labarriere, he was wounded near the Afula area and later died in the Jewish Hospital at Afula. He was wounded while investigating an alleged violation of the truce provisions by Jewish forces.

=== Mount Scopus incidents ===
On 24 July 1956 in the disputed armistice line of Jerusalem's Mount Scopus demilitarized zone, Jordan's Arab Legion occupied a house close to what was claimed as Jewish property on Mount Scopus. Israeli fire from the Hebrew University of Jerusalem was soon brought to bear on the Jordanian position; a protracted fire-fight ensued. Canadian officers Major Marcel Breault and Major George Flint who were serving as observers with the United Nations Truce Supervision Organization (UNTSO), managed to arrange a local ceasefire. However, while attempting to reach the Palestinian Arab house in question and confer directly with the Jordanians, one of the officers detonated an anti-personnel mine, the explosion severely wounding both soldiers.

The day after the wounding of MOs Breault and Flint, a Jordanian mob attacked Swedish observer Lt.-Col. E.H. Thalin.

On 26 May 1958 at 1654 Local time Lieutenant-Colonel Flint was killed apparently by a single sniper round from Jordan while trying to evacuate wounded Israelis from an Israeli police patrol. After Lt.-Colonel Flint had proceeded 40 to 50 metres towards the place where the body of the previously killed Israeli officer was situated, carrying a white flag, there was a single shot and he was hit by a bullet of apparently the same origin, as the one which had hit the Israeli policeman a few minutes earlier. An unwounded Israeli lying only two metres from Lt.-Colonel Flint shouted that the latter was not moving and that he could see the entrance hole of the bullet. An UNMO who was at a short distance saw the impact of the bullet and, as Lt.-Colonel Flint had fallen immediately, concluded that he must have been killed instantly.

=== Captain Jack Holly, USMC. ===
Captain Jack Holly, USMC joined UNTSO in May 1973, several months before the outbreak of the Yom Kippur War. In the period just after the Yom Kippur cease fire was declared, Captain Holly and his OP partner, an Irish UNMO, were on post high on the elevated ridges of Mt. Hermon. Late one evening, an over-enthusiastic Arab soldier burst on the scene and forced them out of their racks. The Arab soldier commenced a gun-point march toward Damascus with both Holly and the Irish UNMO wearing only their skivies. Under the security of darkness, the Arab soldier marched them barefoot over very rocky terrain. They passed an Israeli strong point, went through Syrian lines, and then walked halfway to Damascus. Once the Syrian Government realized the situation, both the Irish and U.S. Marine UNMO were returned to UN custody. Nevertheless, their feet were severely damaged. Captain Holly was in a convalescent status for a prolonged period and the Irish UNMO experienced a nervous breakdown in addition to tremendous physical problems.

== See also ==
- 1952 Beit Jala raid
- Mount Scopus
- Qibya massacre
