= Greater Jerusalem =

Metropolitan area of Jerusalem

In Israel, the Jerusalem metropolitan area is the area encompassing the approximately one hundred square miles surrounding the Old City of Jerusalem with a population of 1,253,900. The expansion of Jerusalem under Israeli law followed its official annexation of the city in the aftermath of the 1967 Six-Day War. Greater Jerusalem is divided into three areas: the outer ring, the New City/Center, and The Historical Center/Inner Ring. The rings are mainly used as an administrative tool to incorporate, public transit, housing, and utility services under a common structure. Greater Jerusalem can be said to encompass the entire City of Jerusalem (both its Western and Eastern parts) and its suburbs. It is the second largest metropolitan area in Israel, behind Gush Dan.

== History ==
Though the core ring, made up of the city of Jerusalem, is ancient, the metropolitan area is relatively new. Following the 1948 Arab–Israeli War, Jerusalem was divided between the Israel and Jordan. Immediately after the establishment of the state of Israel, the government designated Jerusalem as the capital, and from then until the Six-Day War, only a few metropolitan processes took place around Jerusalem, as the area surrounding the city within the borders of the State of Israel was narrow, small, and limited (and was therefore referred to as the “Jerusalem Corridor”). Following the Six-Day War in 1967, the two parts of Jerusalem were united under Israeli rule, the city's borders were expanded, and today it is the largest city in the country by area. In the following years, new neighbourhoods were built on the outskirts of the city, such as Pisgat Ze’ev in the north of the city.

== Metropolitan rings ==
The area is divided into three areas, known as "Metropolitan Rings", which are used primarily as an administrative tool. These areas are the suburbs, which are primarily composed of settlements, the new city centre and the old city centre, or historical centre. These are known as the outer ring, centre, and core respectively.

=== Outer ring ===
This area is composed of state-authorized settlements and unauthorized settlement outposts. They are connected to each other and to Jerusalem by a network of roads and checkpoints. The three major settlements with a degree of local autonomy are Ma‘ale Adumim, Gush Etzion, and Giv’at Ze’ev.

=== Historical centre ===
It is an ancient city from which the other parts of the city sprang from. During the 1948 Arab–Israeli War, West Jerusalem was among the areas incorporated into Israel, while East Jerusalem, including the Old City, was occupied and annexed by Jordan. Israel occupied East Jerusalem from Jordan during the 1967 Six-Day War and subsequently annexed it into the city's municipality, together with additional surrounding territory.

== Demographics ==
Metropolitan rings in the Jerusalem metropolitan area
Metropolitan ring	Localities	Population (2016 estimate)				Population density (per km^{2})	Annual Population growth rate
Metropolitan ring	Localities	Total	Jews and others	Thereof: Jews	Arabs	Population density (per km^{2})	Annual Population growth rate
Core	1	882,700	550,100	536,600	332,600	7,051.4	2%
Outer Ring	85	371,200	359,000	353,200	12,200	559.7	3.7%
Western Section	56	193,200	181,200	177,300	12,000	559.7	4.4%
Judea and Samaria Section	8	178,100	177,800	175,900	300	-	2.9%
Total	86	1,253,900	909,100	889,800	344,800	2287.4	2.5%

Notes

1. The population of "Jews and others" incl. Jews, non-Arab Christians and those not classified by religion.
2. Includes the city of Jerusalem.
3. Includes the cities Bet Shemesh, Maale Adumim, Mevasseret Zion, as well as many smaller towns (local councils). It does not include nearby Arab communities in the West Bank, such as Ramallah, Al-Bireh, Bethlehem, Abu Dis, or Bethany. Instead, they these Arab communities are part of East Jerusalem metropolitan area, notified by the Palestinian Authority.

== See also ==
- Old City (Jerusalem)
- West Jerusalem
- East Jerusalem
- Jerusalem District
- City Line (Jerusalem)
- Green Line (Israel)
- Positions on Jerusalem
- Jerusalem Governorate
