= Vagn Bennike =

Danish army engineer and demolitions expert (1888–1970)

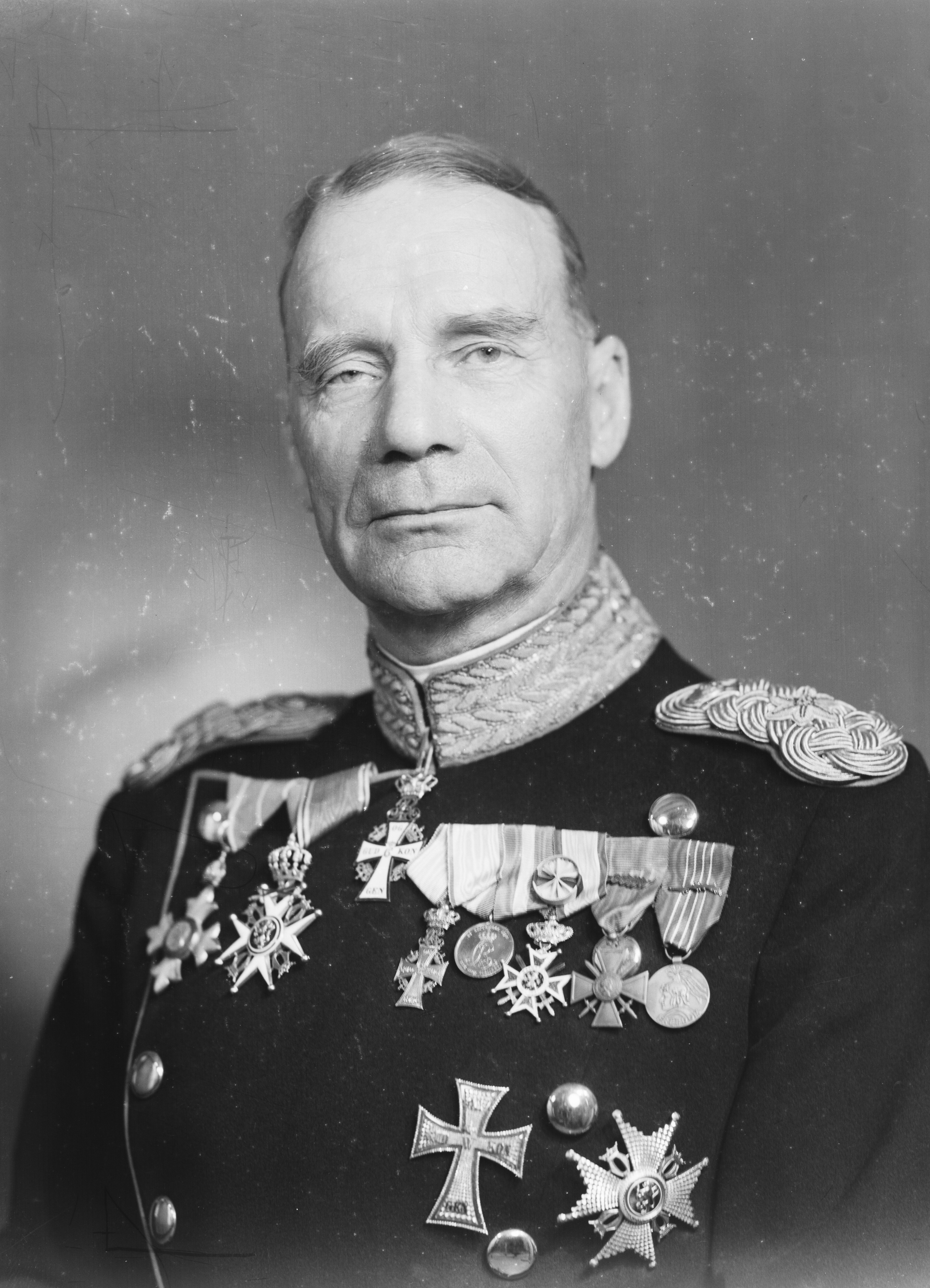
- Born: 6 January 1888; Frederiksberg, Denmark
- Died: 30 November 1970 (aged 82); Hellerup, Denmark
- Burial place: Hellerup Cemetery
- Military career
- Allegiance: Denmark
- Branch: Royal Danish Army
- Service years: 1912–1953
- Rank: Generalmajor
- Nickname: GOAL
- Conflicts: World War II

Vagn Bennike (6 January 1888 – 30 November 1970) was a Danish army officer and resistance fighter. Following the end of World War II, Bennike became Generalmajor and served as Commander of UNTSO.

== Early life ==
Vagn Bennike was born on 6 January 1888 to Estrid (nee Høgsbro) (d. 1944) and Lieutenant Colonel H.F. Bennike (d. 1920). His brothers were Helge, Holger and Ove Bennike.

== Career ==
Bennike was from a military family and joined the Danish Army. He became a First Lieutenant in 1912, a Captain in 1922 and was a teacher at the Royal Danish Military Academy between 1923 and 1945. He was commander in the Ingeniørkorpset (Engineers' Corps) in 1930, Chief of Staff at the Ingeniørtropperne 1932-1937 and Lieutenant Colonel and Commander of the First Pioneer Battalion in 1937.

=== World War II ===
During the occupation of Denmark during World War II he worked in the Danish resistance movement in Jutland, attached to the army's illegal tasks unit.

When Resistance leader Flemming Juncker had to leave the country in April 1944, Vagn Bennike and Christian Ulrik Hansen took over the leadership in Jutland but Hansen was caught by the Gestapo and executed in the summer of 1944. Bennike was formally subject to the Danish Freedom Council, but was effectively under the command of Den lille Generalstab, the Danish Army's illegal leadership, which operated under the army chief, General Ebbe Gørtz. Bennike organised and streamlined the Jutland resistance, but was often at odds with Jens Toldstrup, who was responsible for the resistance movement in North Jutland. His code name was GOAL, but also worked under a number of aliases and code names including (Mr.) Middelbo, Uncle, Uncle Christian, Engineer Søndergaard, Gustav Olsen, Generalen, Cousin, Goal, Gustav, Hans, Jørgensen.

=== Post war ===
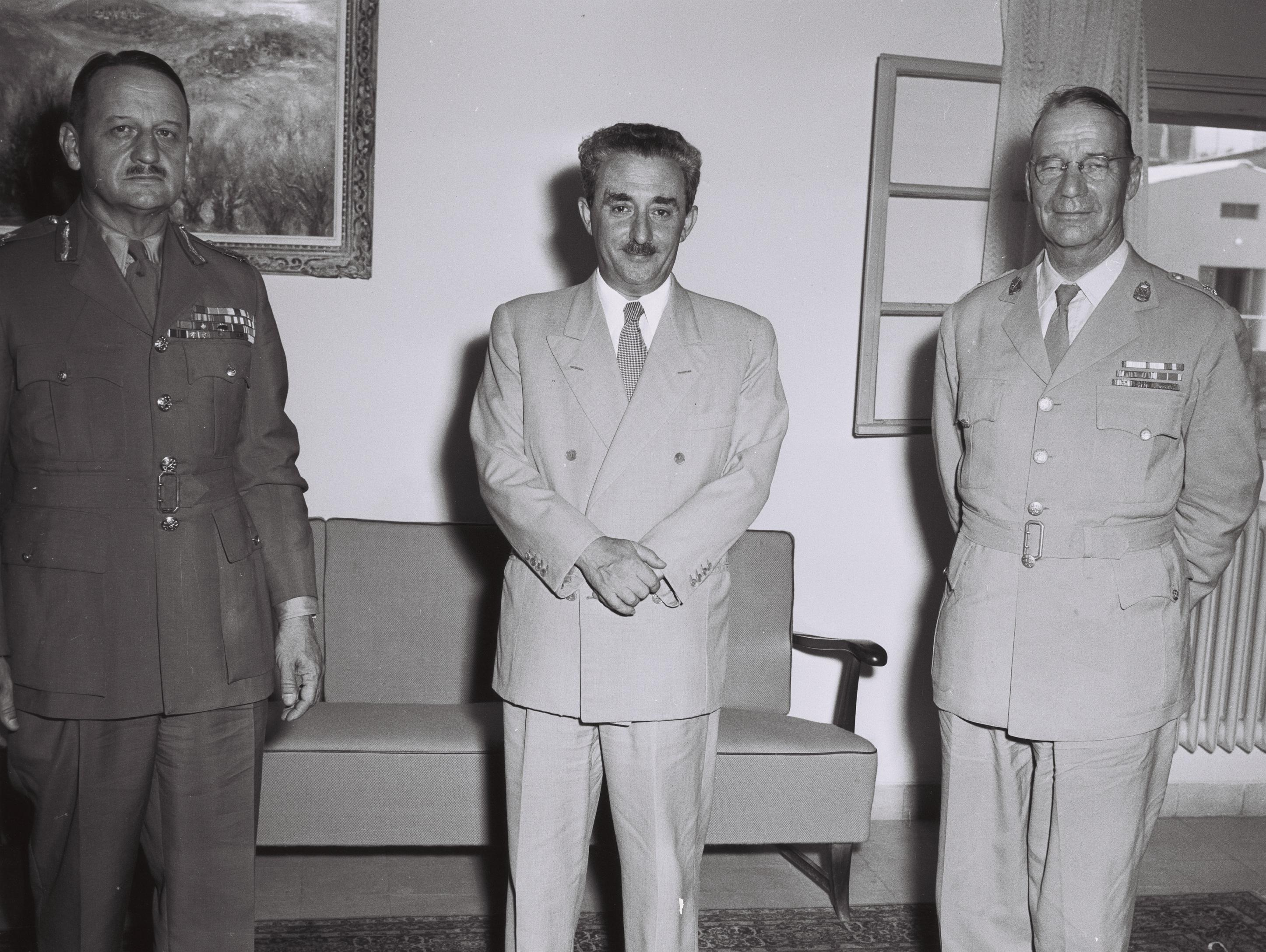
Left to right: General E. L. M. Burns, UNTSO, Moshe Sharett, Israeli Prime Minister, General Vagn Bennike, UNTSO. 1954

On 28 April 1945, with the liberation of Denmark, Bennike was promoted to Major General, and spent the next 8 years as Inspector General of Engineers. He was subsequently appointed in 1953 to succeed William E.Riley as the UN overseer in charge of monitoring the truce lines between Israel and her Arab neighbours, becoming Chief of Staff of UNTSO, the United Nations Truce Supervision Organization, a post in which he served for the period between June 1953 and August 1954. One of his first decisions, in September 1953, was to overrule his predecessor Riley's go-ahead to Israel for work on the proposed hydro-electric project from B'not Yaakov Bridge to Lake Kinneret, which ran through part of the demilitarized zone. Bennike suspended the work until multilateral negotiations could settle the dispute.

After the 1953 Qibya massacre, in which sixty-nine Palestinian civilians (the majority of whom were women and children) were murdered by the Israel Defence Force, he was called to testify before the United Nations Security Council in October 1953.

Bennike wrote a foreword to his colleague Commander E.H. Hutchison's book Violent Truce: The Arab-Israeli conflict 1951-1955.

Bennike died in Hellerup on 30 November 1970, aged 82.

== Awards ==
- Order of the Dannebrog, Commander 1st Class (4 October 1949)
- Dannebrogordenens Hæderstegn (6 July 1942)
- Army Long Service Medal
- Order of St. Olav, commander with Star
- Order of the British Empire, Commander
- Order of Orange-Nassau, officer
- Croix de Guerre 1939–1945, with bronze palm
- Medal of Freedom, with bronze palm

Military offices
Preceded by William E. Riley	Chief of Staff, United Nations Truce Supervision Organization; 1953–1954	Succeeded by E. L. M. Burns
