= William E. Riley =

U.S. Marine Corps Lieutenant General

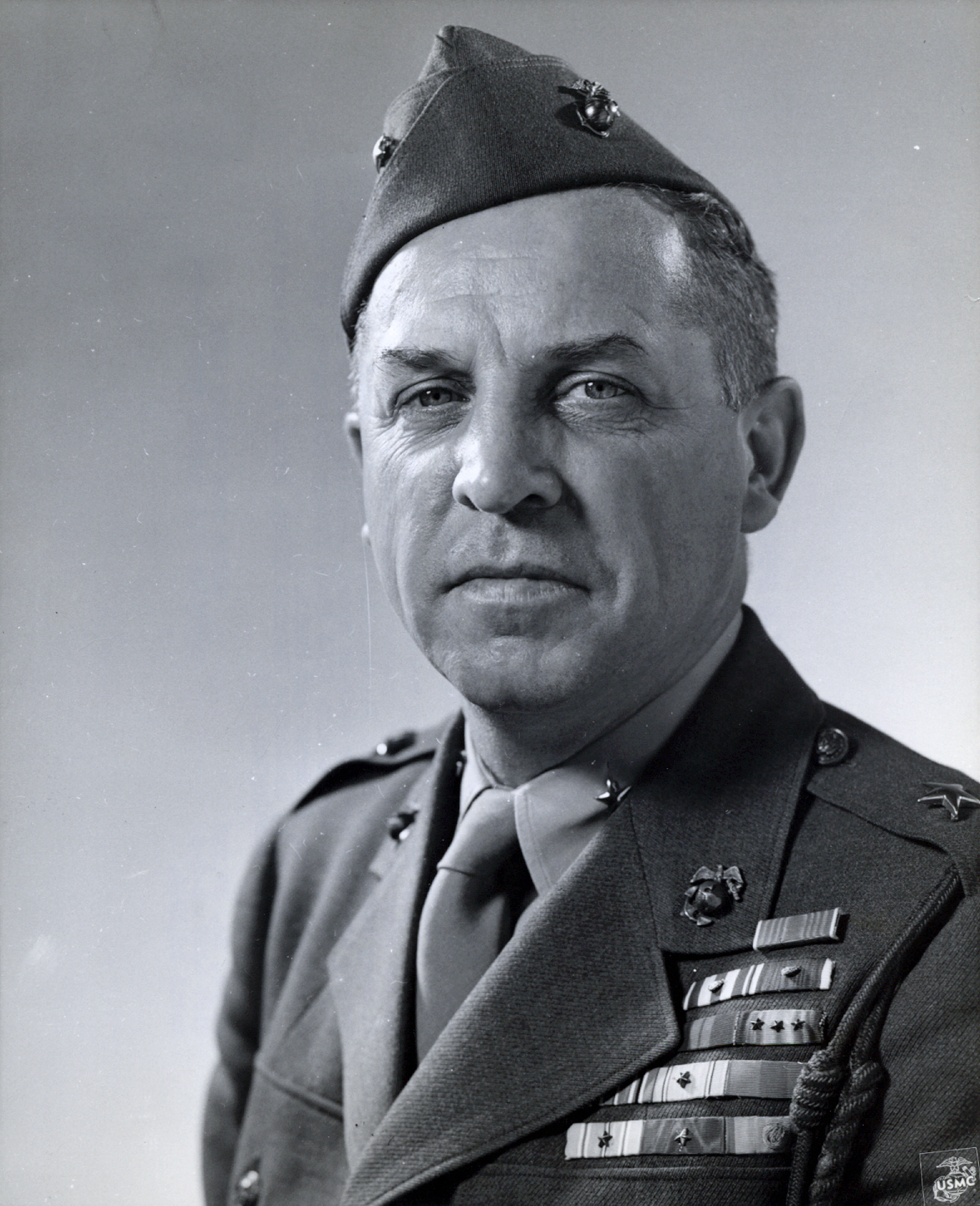
- Born: February 2, 1897; Minneapolis, Minnesota
- Died: April 28, 1970 (aged 73); Annapolis, Maryland
- Military career
- Allegiance: United States
- Branch: United States Marine Corps
- Service years: 1917–1953
- Rank: Lieutenant General
- Service number: 0-829
- Commands: United Nations Truce Supervision Organization; 3rd Marine Division
- Conflicts: World War I: Battle of Belleau Wood; Battle of Château-Thierry; Battle of Soissons; United States occupation of Haiti; World War II: Bougainville Campaign; Palau Island Campaign; Philippines Campaign; 1948 Arab–Israeli War
- Awards: Navy Distinguished Service Medal; Silver Star (2); Legion of Merit (2); Purple Heart (2)

William Edward Riley (February 2, 1897 – April 28, 1970) was a lieutenant general in the United States Marine Corps, who served on the staff of Admiral William Halsey Jr. during World War II. He was also Chief of Staff of the United Nations Truce Supervision Organization in Palestine from 1948 to 1953.

== Early career ==
William E. Riley was born on February 2, 1897, in Minneapolis, Minnesota. He attended the College of St. Thomas in Saint Paul, Minnesota, and graduated in June 1917 with a Bachelor of Arts degree. Riley decided to enlist as a private in the United States Marine Corps during his studies and after graduation, he was commissioned Second lieutenant in the Marine Corps. He was subsequently assigned to the Marine Corps Rifle Range in Winthrop, Maryland, for basic training.

After the finishing of his training, Riley was appointed a platoon leader within the 74th Company, 1st Battalion, 6th Marine Regiment and sailed for France in October 1917. The 6th Regiment participated in the further training activities after its arrival, before entered the trenches in Toulon sector near Verdun in March 1918. During the April of the same year, Germans used combat gas and 74th Company was almost wiped out. Second Lieutenant Riley was also wounded, but he was able to return soon to the frontline, but was transferred to the 95th Company, 1st Battalion, 6th Marine Regiment.

Riley participated in the famous Battle of Belleau Wood in June 1918 and also in the Battle of Château-Thierry, where he was awarded the Silver Star Citation for gallantry in action. He was also promoted to rank of first lieutenant on July 1, 1918. During the Battle of Soissons, Riley participated in the frontal attack. When the company commander was mortally wounded, Riley assumed command of the company and led it forward under heavy enemy machine gun and artillery fire until he himself was severely wounded. His wounds were so serious, that Riley was evacuated back to the United States in December 1918. For his leadership of the company, Riley was decorated with his second Silver Star Citation for heroism in action. He was also awarded the Croix de guerre with Guilt Star and Fourragère by the Government of France.

== World War II ==
With the United States entry to World War II, Riley still served as Fleet Marine Officer with Atlantic Squadron under the command of Admiral Royal E. Ingersoll. During that time, Riley was promoted to rank of colonel on January 1, 1942. At the end of April 1942, Colonel Riley was transferred to the War Plans Division within Headquarters of commander in chief, United States Fleet, where he served under the command of Admiral Ernie King. For his outstanding service in that capacity, Riley was decorated with Navy Commendation Medal.

On April 1, 1943, Riley was promoted to the rank of brigadier general and transferred to the Pacific theater, where he was appointed Assistant War Plans officer on the staff of Commander South Pacific Area under Admiral William Halsey. He was later appointed assistant chief of staff of war plans within South Pacific Area Command. In this capacity, admiral Halsey asked Riley for advice in the matter of I Marine Amphibious Corps new commander. Both agreed on the name of major general Roy S. Geiger.

During his service in this capacity, Riley was awarded the Legion of Merit and later also with Navy Distinguished Service Medal. The citation for his Navy Distinguished Service Medal reads:

The President of the United States of America takes pleasure in presenting the Navy Distinguished Service Medal to Brigadier General William E. Riley (MCSN: 0-829), United States Marine Corps, for exceptionally meritorious and distinguished service in a position of great responsibility to the Government of the United States as Assistant War Plans Officer and subsequently as Assistant Chief of Staff, War Plans, on the Staff of the Commander, South Pacific Area and South Pacific Force in the preparations for the operations of troops of that command from 22 July 1943 to 8 April 1944. Displaying keen insight into the problems of amphibious warfare, painstaking care in planning, and shrewd and skillful judgment, Brigadier General Riley was instrumental in preparing plans for the assault of Vella Lavella, Bougainville, Green and Emirau Island which materially advanced the progress of the war and resulted in the saving of large numbers of lives of Allied troops. His thorough knowledge of landing operations and his grasp of the strategic situation contributed in large part toward enabling the theater commander to by-pass heavily defended enemy bases, thereby hastening operations at a minimum cost in casualties. The comprehensive knowledge, brilliant strategic planning, and careful preparation displayed by Brigadier General Riley throughout this period reflected great credit upon himself and upheld the highest traditions of the United States Naval Service.

Riley later served again under admiral Halsey as assistant chief of staff of war plans within his United States Third Fleet. Riley participated with this command in the Palau Island Campaign and Philippines Campaign and later in 1944 served as advisor to Admiral Halsey on amphibious and ground operations in the Western Pacific and Southwest Pacific areas. For his service in this capacity, Riley was awarded his second Legion of Merit with Combat "V".

On May 12, 1945, Riley was transferred to the 3rd Marine Division under the command of Major General Graves B. Erskine and served as assistant division commander. Division was stationed on Guam at that time. On October 21, Graves was transferred back to the United States and Riley was appointed commanding general of the 3rd Marine Division. He only oversaw the inactivation of the division, which was finished on December 28, 1945.

== Postwar career ==
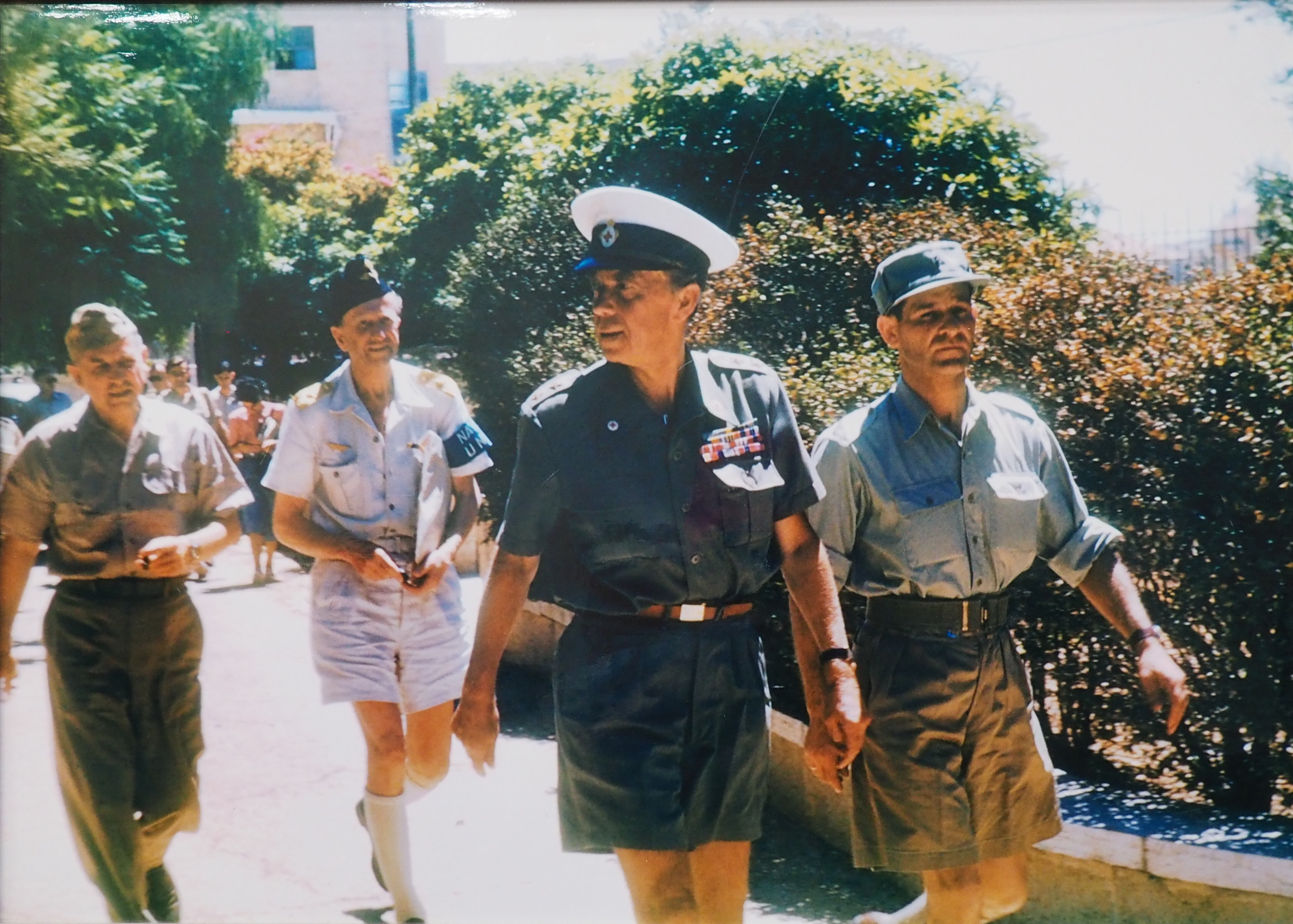
William E. Riley (left), Jerusalem, 1948, with Folke Bernadotte

Riley returned from the Pacific and was appointed director, Division of Public Information within Headquarters Marine Corps in Washington D.C. serving until June 1946, when he was appointed director, Division of Recruiting. On May 31, 1948, Riley was transferred to Camp Lejeune, North Carolina, where he was detached for brief period to 2nd Marine Division.

During the August 1948, Riley was sent to Middle East and was appointed Commander of the United Nations Truce Supervision Organization (UNTSO). In this capacity, he served as Senior US observer in Palestine, who was in charge of co-ordination of assistance and inspecting of US observers under mediator Folke Bernadotte. During that time, he was also promoted to the rank of major general and was involved in the "Barrel Incident".

Riley retired from the Marine Corps in June 1953. He was advanced to the rank of lieutenant general on the retired list due to having been specially commended in combat. After his retirement from the Marine Corps, Riley was appointed deputy director for management of United States Foreign Operations Administration in September 1953. Within this agency, he was appointed director of United States Operations Mission in Turkey. He finally retired in May 1955.

Riley died on April 28, 1970, in Naval Hospital in Annapolis, Maryland. He was survived by his wife Katherine and son William E. Riley Jr., and daughter Katherine E. Ward. His son was also career Marine Corps officer, who served in Korea and Vietnam and was decorated multiple times, including award of the Legion of Merit with Combat "V". They are all buried at Arlington National Cemetery, Virginia.

== Decorations ==
Here is the ribbon bar of Lieutenant General Riley:

1st Row	Navy Distinguished Service Medal	Silver Star Medal with Oak leaf cluster	Legion of Merit with 5/16 inch gold star & Combat "V"	Navy Commendation Medal
2nd Row	Purple Heart Medal with Oak leaf cluster	Marine Corps Expeditionary Medal	World War I Victory Medal with three battle clasps	Haitian Campaign Medal
3rd Row	American Defense Service Medal with Fleet clasp	American Campaign Medal	Asiatic-Pacific Campaign Medal with four 3/16 inch service stars	World War II Victory Medal
4th Row	National Defense Service Medal	French Croix de guerre 1914–1918 with Gilt Star	Haitian Order of Honour and Merit, Officer	Philippine Liberation Medal with two stars

Military offices
Preceded by Åge Lundström	Chief of Staff, United Nations Truce Supervision Organization; 1948–1953	Succeeded by Vagh Bennike
Preceded by Graves B. Erskine	3rd Marine Division; October – December 1945	Unit deactivated
