= Jordan–Israel Mixed Armistice Commission =

United Nations organisation of observers

Hashemite Kingdom of Jordan/Israel Mixed Armistice Commission (HKJI MAC) was the United Nations organisation of observers which dealt with complaints from Jordan and Israel to maintain the fragile cease fire along the demarcation line (Green Line) between Israel and Jordan. At the closing of the 1948 Arab-Israeli War, on 3 April 1949, the Hashemite Kingdom of Jordan signed a truce with Israel called the 1949 Armistice Agreements. The United Nations Truce Supervision Organization posted Military Observers as part of the Mixed Armistice Commissions (MACs) to observe the truce on the cease fire line and to liaise with the Israeli and Jordanian local area commanders. While the 1948 war was concluded with the 1949 Armistice Agreements it has not marked the end of the Arab–Israeli conflict. The HKJ/IMAC was the organisation which monitored the Jordan/Israel truce agreement, the HJK/IMAC Headquarters was located in Jerusalem close to the Green Line and, through close liaison with the UNTSO headquarters in Government House, Jerusalem, was charged with supervising the truce, investigating border incidents, and taking remedial action to prevent the recurrence of such incidents along the Jordan/Israel Green Line.

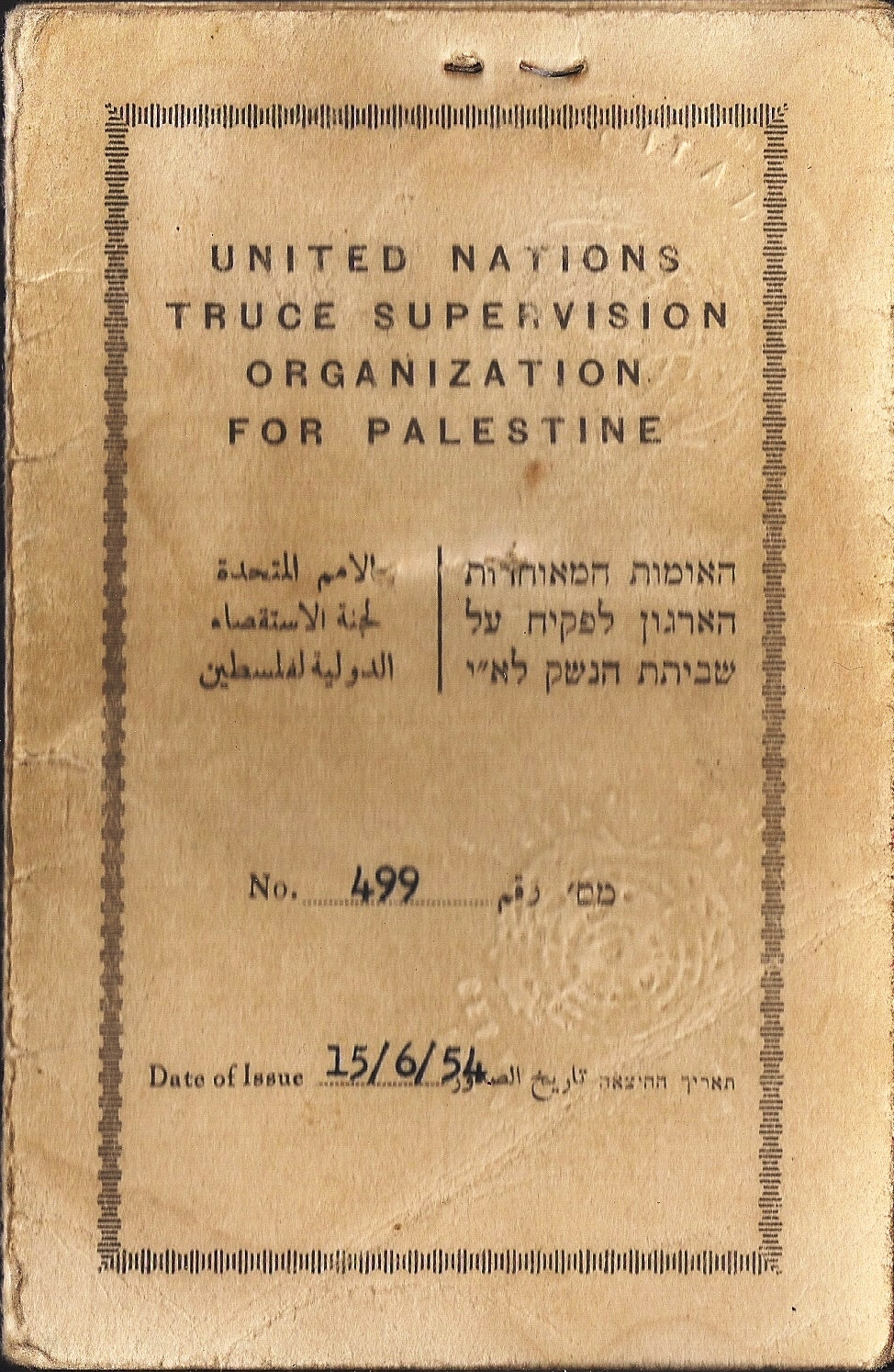
1954 issued United Nations special ID & pass to commission head Lt. Col. Charles F. Brewster

== Headquarters ==
Hashemite Kingdom of Jordan/Israel Mixed Armistice Commission (HKJIMAC) maintained its headquarters (HQ) in Jerusalem. After the "Barrel Incident" the HKJIMAC HQ was moved into the Demilitarised Zone (DMZ) close to the Mandelbaum Gate. The overall HQ of the UNTSO after moving from Cairo to Haifa ended up in Government House, Jerusalem.

== Local area commanders' agreements ==
Mount Scopus Demilitarisation Agreement of 7 July 1948 the agreement was initialled by Franklyn M Begley, a UN official, Colonel Abdullah el Tell and by Colonel David Shaltiel, the Jordanian and Israeli military commanders in Jerusalem.

Mount Scopus Demilitarisation Agreement of 21 July 1948 Israeli and Jordanian local commanders with subsidiary agreement initialled by Franklyn M Begley and the local Jordanian commander but not by the Israeli commander.

In late 1951 General de Ridder negotiated a local commanders' agreement in an effort to reduce border tension. On the first day of February 1952, a new agreement went into effect and for three full months all complaints were handled by the local commanders. Incidents did occur during the period of February to May but they were considered as less serious and far fewer than before. In May 1952 the Local Commanders' Agreement fell before the constant criticism of the Israeli delegates to the MAC. They claimed it was ineffective and yet their own Local Commanders spoke highly of the arrangement. By the end of May 1952 occurrence of incidents was more frequent and they were also becoming more serious.

Further "Agreements on measures to curb infiltration" which was put in force from May 1952. The new agreement stipulated that instructions would be given to all local authorities and commanders to-strengthen measures to ensure the prevention of all illegal crossings of the demarcation line. It was also provided that firing would he reduced to a strict minimum; that it would be prohibited during the day-time on people who had crossed the demarcation line, unless they resisted arrest. Stolen property was to be returned as soon as found, without waiting for any-thing to be handed over by the other side in return; flocks found grazing on the wrong side of the demarcation line would be returned immediately subject to payment, according to fixed rates, for their keep and also for the damage they might have caused. It was, moreover, agreed that complaints would be kept at a minimum by attempting to settle minor incidents at the local, commander's level. A few days after that new agreement had come into force, the Jordanians captured an Israel driving-school vehicle which had made an apparently strange mistake in leaving the Jerusalem-Tel Aviv highway and crossing the demarcation line in very difficult terrain in the Latrun area. There were in the vehicle a civilian and three soldiers. The new agreement provided that members of the security forces of either Party who crossed the demarcation line "by mistake" should be returned after interrogation. The Jordanians having delayed the return of the three soldiers, Israel announced on 8 January 1953 that the new agreement to reduce and solve incidents was null and void. The agreement provided that, if it came to expiration, the old "agreement on measures to curb infiltration", signed on 13 May 1952, would automatically re-enter into force. On 8 January 1953, Israel also gave formal notice of its desire to terminate the old agreement to two weeks' time, as permitted by the text of that agreement. On 22 January 1953, the local commander's agreement for the prevention and settlement of minor incidents, particularly the crossing of the line by infiltrators or by flocks, came to an end. On that day an Israeli soldier was killed when an Israeli patrol crossed the demarcation line and exchanged fire with the. inhabitants of Falameh village.

Following the 101 (1953). Resolution of 24 November 1953 [S/3139/Rev.2] where the Security Council "took note of the fact that there is substantial evidence of crossing of the demarcation line by unauthorized persons often resulting in acts of violence and requests the Government of Jordan to continue and strengthen the measures which they are already taking to prevent such crossing." The Jordanian authorities carried out the following measures:

(a) Increase of the number of police assigned to the border area;

(b) Increase of the number of patrols;

(c) Replacement of village mukhtars and area commanders, where laxity of border control was suspected;

(d) Removal from the border area of suspected infiltrators and imposing of heavy sentences on known infiltrators;

Commander E H Hutchison USMC (Chairman of the MAC) was able to confirm and verify that Jordan had increased the number of border police and border patrols by over 30 per cent and that three village Mukhtars and thirteen area commanders had been moved from their sectors because of laxness in border control. Also that the jails at Nablus, Hebron, and Amman were "loaded" with prisoners, many of whom were being held on nothing more than suspicion of infiltration. Commander E H Hutchison USMC had seen the order that was sent out from Arab Legion Headquarters to area commanders to prevent illegal cultivation. At the same time new powers had been granted to local judges to enable them to take firmer measures against those who grazed their flocks too close to the border or cultivated beyond the UN line of demarcation. Bedouin tribes living east of the Wadi Araba in the southern part of Jordan had been warned to stay back from the frontier area. The UN observers were aware of all of Jordan's efforts to curb infiltration and that those efforts had reached the total capabilities of the country.

== Truce Violations ==
The HKJIMAC condemned Israel expelling some 200 inhabitants of the village of Wadi Fukin and sending them across the Armistice Agreement lines on 15 July 1949.

=== Beit Jalla Reprisal Raid 1952 ===
In late December 1951 a rape murder occurred. The MAC investigating officer, Major Loreaux, reported to the Chairman of the Mixed Armistice Commission, Commander E H Hutchison USNR and Commandant Bouvet that the body of the girl had been found hidden in a cave about a mile from the Jordan/Israel border, "the girl had been raped, murdered and that her face had been mutilated". Major Loreaux reported that at the scene there was nothing, however, that indicate that Jordanian infiltrators had committed the crime. The case had not therefore been discussed by the Mixed Armistice Commission. Major Loreaux further

"expressed the opinion that the Israeli police would have a better chance of finding the killer than the Arabs would".

On 6 January 1952 at Beit Jalla an Israeli "reprisal raid" occurred where three houses were demolished by explosive charges. In the first house targeted the upper floor had been completely destroyed by a demolition charge. The lower part of the house which had been built into the side of the hill, was still partially intact, although bullet holes pockmarked the walls and doors.

The inhabitants of the first house, a twenty-three-year-old Arab and his wife, had been killed by the blast.

"There was little left for burial."

At the second target the demolition charge had been less effective and only one wall was damaged the windows, however, were all shattered and the walls, as with the first house targeted, were again pockmarked by the heavy rifle and sub-machine gun fire. Commander E H Hutchison then searched the vicinity for evidence and interrogated witnesses. The adult male occupant of the second house was brought to the investigators for interrogation. While relating the events, the father held tightly to his little three-year-old daughter "as if he might lose her at any moment."

The fathers' version of events was that on hearing a blast, this was his neighbor's house being demolished by explosive, just seconds before the wall of his own home was blown in.

"He had grabbed a rifle and told his wife to take their daughter and rush to the main part of the village for safety. The wife, who was eight-months pregnant, moved cautiously to follow his orders. She had taken only a few steps from the back door when the Israelis, who were firing from behind a stone wall, turned their fire in her direction. The bullet that passed through her body from the back snuffed out the life she was carrying, but her own life was miraculously spared".

The third house targeted contained the bodies of a mother and her four children, ranging in age from 6 to 14.

"They were sprawled about the room their bodies riddled by bullets and grenade fragments".

Commander Hutchison then collected up the available evidence; there was abandoned demolition charges bearing the Israeli markings. Pinned to the three targeted houses was also a "rose coloured leaflet".

"The messages, written in Arabic Translated as, "There will always be arrows in our quiver': "On 4 December 1951, persons from Beit Jalla killed a young Jewess near Beit Vaghan after committing towards her a crime that will never be expiated. What we have done here now is recompense for this horrendous crime we can never remain silent when it comes to criminals. There will always be arrows in our quivers for the likes of these. Let those who would know, (know) BEWARE".

The United Nations Truce Supervision Organization issued a condemnation to Israel for the "serious breach of the General Armistice Agreement" in the Beit Jalla reprisal raid.

The Israeli delegates did not deny the guilt of Israel they abstained in the voting. No Israeli attempt to bring to trial the estimated 45 persons responsible for this crime was ever made known to the Commission. Those Observers who had been on the mission for many months merely shrugged it off: "People carrying out official orders are seldom brought to trial

=== Rantis and Falameh reprisal raid ===
22nd and 28–29 January 1953 Israeli military forces estimated at 120 to 150 men, using 2-inch mortars, 3-inch mortars, P.I.A.T. (projectors, infantry, anti-tank) weapons, bangalore torpedoes (long metal tubes containing an explosive charge), machine-guns, grenades and small arms, crossed the demarcation line and attacked the Arab villages of Falameh (22 January) and Rantis (28/29 January). At Falameh (Falāma, Falamya) the mukhtar was killed, seven other villagers were wounded, and three houses were demolished. The attack lasted four and a half hours. Israel was condemned for this act by the Mixed Armistice Commission. The body of an Israeli soldier with an Israeli identification disc marked with the number 232046 and the name Yehuda Kacim, in Hebrew was handed over to two officers of the Israeli Army who accepted it as that of an Israeli soldier without any reservations on 23 January.

22 April 1953, firing broke out at sunset within Jerusalem along the demarcation line on a length of about 4 kilometres. It lasted two hours, until the cease-fire arranged by United Nations observers came into effect. On the following day, there were isolated shots in the early morning and in the afternoon. There were twenty Jordanian casualties-ten killed and ten wounded. Six Israelis were wounded. The Jerusalem incident was investigated by United Nations observers. After studying the evidence thus collected, my predecessor, General Riley, in a report to the Security Council on the violation of the cease-fire [S/3607], stated that it appeared impossible to determine who fired the first shot.

On 25, 26 and 27 May 1953, the two parties submitted complaints alleging violation of the General Armistice Agreement by civilians and military personnel in the Al-Dawayima area. In an emergency meeting of the Mixed Armistice Commission, both parties agreed to a mixed investigation. United Nations observers accompanied the representatives to the demarcation line to establish the facts. Despite the cease-fire which had been previously arranged, heavy firing broke out during the investigation. The origin of the incident was the illegal cultivation by Jordanians of land in Israel territory. Armed Jordanians had penetrated Israel territory to harvest crops, and other Jordanians had fired across the demarcation line to protect the harvesters. On the other hand, Israel troops had fired across the demarcation line at Jordanians in Jordan territory, and Israeli soldiers had burned crops in Jordan territory. The use of specially manufactured incendiary bombs to destroy a lorry inside the village of Qibya. The necks and trigger attachments of these bombs which were found near the burned vehicle at Qibya was the type of bomb used by Israel military forces to burn the field of grain inside Jordan on 28 May 1953 in the Al-Dawayima area. This incident was discussed at the 122nd Mixed Armistice Commission meeting.

During the latter part of May 1953, incidents took place which cost the lives of three persons and in which six others were wounded. There seemed to be no motive for these crimes other than killing for the sake of killing. On the night of 25–26 May, an armed group from Jordan attacked two homes in Beit Arif, wounding two women. The same night, armed Jordanians attacked a home in Beit Nabala, killing a woman and wounding her husband and two children. Jordan was condemned for all three of these attacks. On the night of 9 June, armed Jordanians blew up a house in Tirat Yehuda, killing one man, And two nights later an armed band struck at a house in Kfar Hess, killing a woman and seriously wounding her husband. Jordan was again condemned by the Mixed Armistice Commission for these attacks. Both Governments were greatly concerned over the happenings during this fortnight, and a great effort was made to stop the work of these groups, which seemed bent on creating tension along the border.

11 August 1953, Israel military forces using demolition mines, bangalore torpedoes, 2-inch mortars, machine-guns and small arms attacked the villages of Idna, Surif and Wadi Fukin, inflicting casualties among the inhabitants and destroying dwellings. The body of an Israel soldier in full uniform with identification tag was found in the village of Idna after the attack. The Mixed Armistice Commission condemned Israel for these attacks.

2 September 1953: Palestinian infiltrated from Jordan, and reached the neighbourhood of Katamon, in the heart of Jerusalem. They threw hand grenades in all directions. Miraculously, no one was hurt.

2 October 1953: The explosion of a land mine on the Israel railway north of Eyal derailed an Israel freight train. The Mixed Armistice Commission has held Jordan responsible for this act of violence which caused no loss of life and relatively little damage, as the train was made up of empty tank cars.

=== Qibya ===
14 15 October 1953: Qibya massacre The crossing of the demarcation line by a force approximating one half of a fully equipped battalion from the Israel regular army. Into Qibya village, to attack the inhabitants by firing from automatic weapons, throwing grenades, and using Bangalore torpedoes together with TNT explosive. Forty-one dwelling houses and a school building were destroyed. Resulting in the murder of forty-two lives (later increased to 53) including men, women [and] children, and the wounding of fifteen persons and the damage of a police car, [and] at the same time, the crossing of a part of the same group into Shuqba village, [are] a breach of article III, para-graph 2 of the General Armistice Agreement. With the report of E. H. HUTCHISON "Commander, United States Navy"

Israel Unit 101 commanded by Ariel Sharon, attacks Qibya in the West Bank killing 53 Palestinians. between thirty and forty buildings had been completely demolished, including the school, the water-pumping station, the police station and the telephone office. Bullet-riddled bodies near the doorways and multiple bullet hits on the doors of the demolished houses indicated that the inhabitants had been forced to remain inside until their homes were blown up over them. Witnesses were uniform in describing their experience as a night of horror, during which Israel soldiers moved about in their village blowing up buildings, firing into doorways and windows with automatic weapons and throwing hand grenades. A number of unexploded hand grenades, marked with Hebrew letters indicating recent Israel manufacture, and three bags of TNT were found in and about the village.

By the time the acting chairman of the Mixed Armistice Commission left Qibya, twenty-seven bodies had been dug from the rubble. The villagers were digging for others who they claimed were still buried beneath the building stones. They believed that the number of dead might reach sixty. Six wounded persons were seen in the village, and the acting chairman was told that there were other wounded persons in the hospital.

=== Two Israeli soldiers killed ===
16 December 1953, two Israeli soldiers were killed while on patrol inside Israel territory (approximate M. R. 1433–1097). On 21 December, the Mixed Armistice Commission condemned Jordan for this incident.

18 December 1953, a car was ambushed on the Hebron road (approximate M.R. 1658–1221) inside Jordan and an Arab Legion medical officer was killed. Israel was condemned by the Mixed Armistice Commission for this incident (21 December).

21 December 1953, an armed group attacked a Bedouin camp near Tarqumiya (approximate M.R. 1512–1092) wounding one man. Israel was condemned by the Mixed Armistice Commission for this incident (23 December).

21 December, an armed group, using explosives and automatic weapons, attacked a house near Hebron (approximate M.R. 1591–1066) killing one pregnant woman and two men, and wounding another man. Israel was condemned for this incident (24 December). The last three incidents were apparently reprisal attacks for the killing of the two Israeli soldiers on 16 December. Two Arabs responsible for this crime were arrested by the Jordan police a few days later.

14 February 1954, an Israeli villager on guard duty at Mahasyia, near Deiraban, (approximate M. R. 1510–1282) in the central area, was killed. No evidence was introduced to indicate that Jordanians were guilty of this crime and on 18 February the chairman voted against the Israeli draft resolution condemning Jordan.

18 February, the Mixed Armistice Commission condemned Israel and Jordan for firing across the demarcation line on 14 February near Deir al-Ghusun (approximate M. R. 1575–1955) in the northern area. This firing resulted in the killing, of one Jordanian.

16 March 1954, Israelis of the Ein Gev colony began ploughing 130 dunums of land situated near the colony and belonging to the Arab population of demilitarised Nuqeib, in violation of the verbal agreement concluded at Samara in 1950 to the effect that the two parties should retain and work the said land until the problem was settled.

=== Scorpion Pass ===
17 March 1954: Ma-aleh Akrabim incident. A Party of Arabs ambushed a bus travelling from Eilat to Tel Aviv, and opened fire at short range when the bus reached the area of Ma'ale Akrabim in the northern Negev. In the initial ambush, the gunmen killed the driver and wounded most of the passengers. The gunmen then boarded the bus, and shot each passenger, one by one. Eleven passengers were murdered. Survivors recounted how the murderers spat on the bodies and abused them. The Israeli claimed that the gunmen could clearly be traced back to the Jordanian border, some 20 km from the site of the attack. The MAC investigation found that the claim could not be substantiated and that the attack was more likely to have been by Bedouin tribesman from within Israel and the Israeli complaint was not upheld.

=== Israel Government cease using MAC ===
23 March 1954: The Israel Government has severed all connections with the MAC. It has also discontinued attendance at the local commanders' meetings provided for under a separate Israel-Jordan agreement. Israel communications referring to alleged violations by Jordan of the General Armistice Agreement have been addressed to the Secretary-General of the United Nations, with the request that they should be circulated to the members of the Security Council. The Chief of Staff of the Truce Supervision Organization in Jerusalem has been informed of such alleged violations of the General Armistice Agreement only on receiving from New York a copy of the Security Council document. The non-co-operation of the Israel Government has prevented the investigation of such alleged violations in conformity with the provisions of the General Armistice Agreement.

=== Nahalin reprisal raid ===
29 March 1954 at 07.00 hours, local time, at Nahalin village, some 35 kilometres from the demarcation line "an Israel armed force, well equipped, surrounded the village from three directions and penetrated inside the village and opened fire from different automatic weapons, threw hand-grenades and placed mines at some houses, including the mosque of the village. As a result of this brutal attack, 9 persons—8 men and 1 woman—were killed, and 14 others were injured and taken to hospital. Fire lasted for about one hour and a half, and was returned by the village guards. Then the aggressors withdrew. Mines, grenades and other warlike materials bearing Hebrew markings were found on the spot.

=== As Samu Raid ===
13 November 1966, the police fort at Rujm al-Madfa' was destroyed when seventeen tanks took up position and opened fire against the police post, using explosive charges. The shelling lasted 10 minutes. At as as-Samu the village medical clinic, a 6-classroom school and a workshop had been completely demolished. In addition, one mosque and 28 houses had been damaged. Twenty Jordanian army trucks, 2 Jordanian army jeeps and one civilian, bus were totally demolished. One Jordanian army truck had been damaged by machine-gun fire. In a flour mill, 2 explosive charges were found which had failed to detonate. The United Nations Military Observers also observed in the area, one Bedouin dwelling tent and 3 Jordanian army tents completely destroyed. 20 domestic animals which had been killed either by explosions or by small arms fire. At Kh Jimba a column of 60 to 70 vehicles, including armored cars, jeeps and tanks, crossed the ADL towards the villages of Kh Jimba and Kh El Markaz. The tanks and armored cars shelled and opened automatic fire on both villages, while troops on foot preceded them, firing their personal weapons. The tanks and armored cars came near the 2 villages end took position while troops went into the village of Kh Jimba and set demolition charges at 14 houses. 15 stone huts had been totally destroyed, 7 damaged and one water well had been destroyed by demolition.
