= 1949 Armistice Agreements =

Formal ceasefire which ended the 1948 Arab–Israeli War

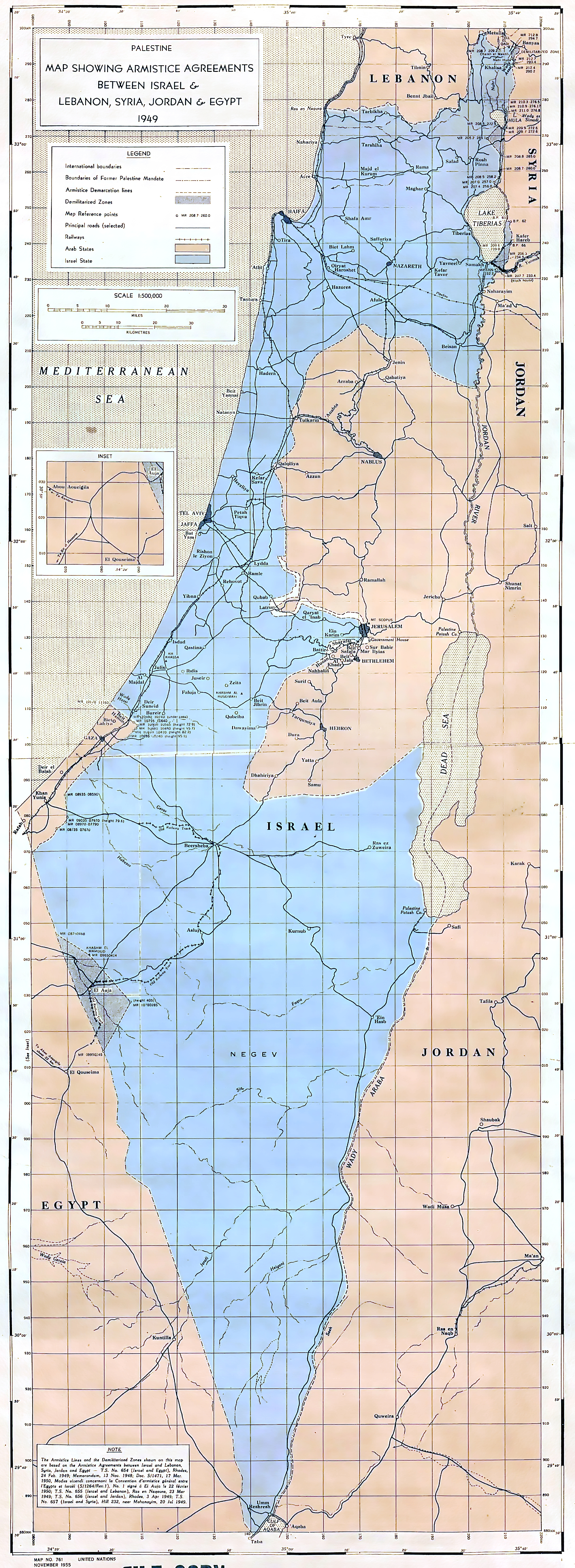
1955 United Nations map showing the Armistice Agreements, with original map reference points ("MR") on the Palestine grid referenced in the respective agreements.

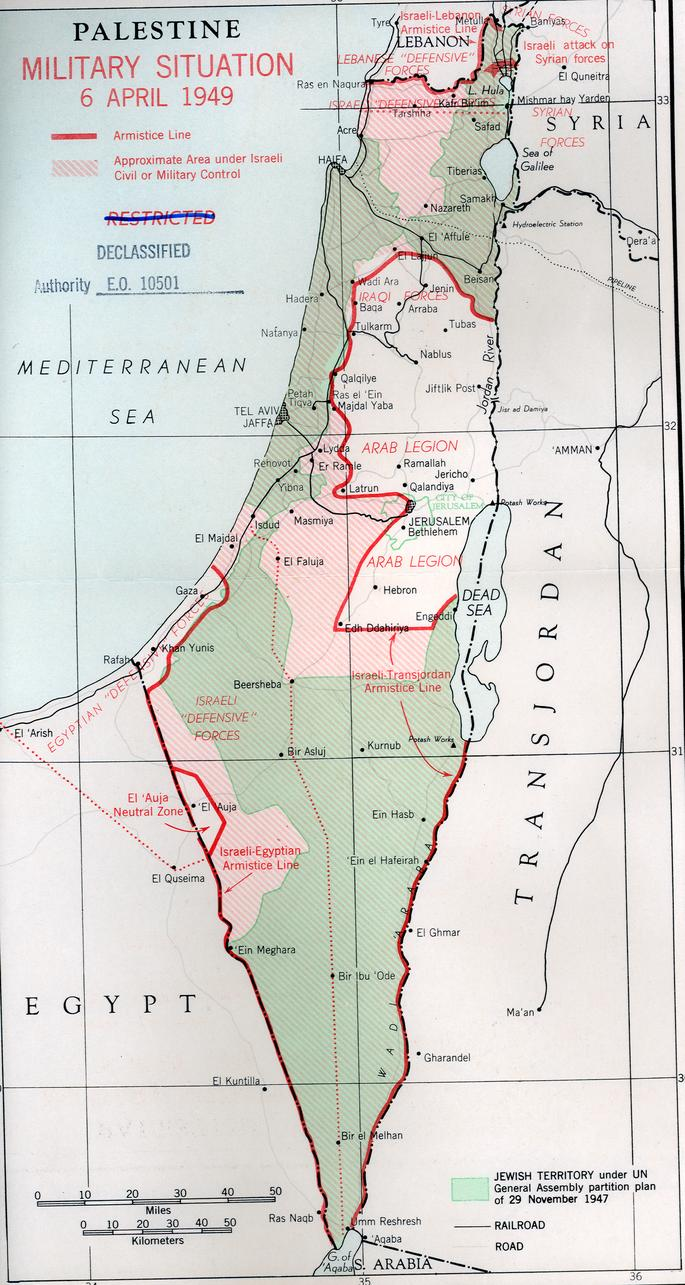
Palestine Military Situation, April 6, 1949. Truman Papers

The 1949 Armistice Agreements were signed between Israel and Egypt, Lebanon, Transjordan, and Syria. They formally ended the hostilities of the 1948 Palestine War and also demarcated the Green Line, which separated Arab-controlled territory (i.e., the Jordanian-annexed West Bank and the Egyptian-occupied Gaza Strip) from Israel until the latter's victory in the 1967 Six-Day War.

To monitor the agreed-upon de facto border, the United Nations (UN) established supervising and reporting agencies; discussions related to the ceasefire's enforcement led to the signing of the separate Tripartite Declaration of 1950, in which the United States, the United Kingdom, and France pledged to take action within and outside of the UN in order to prevent violations of the frontiers. It also outlined their commitment to peace and stability in the area, their opposition to the use or threat of force, and reiterated their opposition to the development of an arms race between Arab countries and Israel.

== Agreements ==
=== With Egypt ===
On 6 January 1949, Ralph Bunche announced that Egypt had finally consented to start talks with Israel on an armistice. The talks began on the Greek island of Rhodes on 12 January. Shortly after their commencement, Israel agreed to the release of a besieged Egyptian brigade in Faluja, but soon rescinded their agreement. At the end of the month, the talks floundered. Israel demanded that Egypt withdraw all its forces from the former area of Mandate Palestine. Egypt insisted that Arab forces withdraw to the positions which they held on 14 October 1948, as per the Security Council Resolution S/1070 of 4 November 1948, and that the Israeli forces withdraw to positions north of the Majdal–Hebron road.

The deadlock culminated on 12 February 1949 with the murder of Hassan al-Banna, leader of the Islamist group Muslim Brotherhood. Israel threatened to abandon the talks, whereupon the United States appealed to the parties to bring them to a successful conclusion.

On 24 February the Israel–Egypt Armistice Agreement was signed in Rhodes. The main points of the armistice agreement were:

- The Armistice Demarcation Line is not to be construed in any sense as a political or territorial boundary, and is delineated without prejudice to rights, claims and positions of either Party to the Armistice as regards ultimate "settlement of the Palestine question".
- The armistice demarcation line was drawn for the most part along the 1922 international border between Egypt and Mandatory Palestine, except near the Mediterranean Sea, where Egypt remained in control of a strip of land along the coast, which became known as the Gaza Strip.
- The Egyptian forces besieged in the Faluja Pocket were allowed to return to Egypt with their weapons, and the area was handed over to Israeli military control.
- A zone on both sides of the border around 'Uja al-Hafeer was to be demilitarized, and became the seat of the bilateral armistice committee.

=== With Lebanon ===
The agreement with Lebanon was signed on 23 March 1949. The main points were:

- The provisions of this agreement being dictated exclusively by military considerations.
- The armistice line ("Green Line", see also Blue Line [Lebanon]) was drawn along the international boundary between Lebanon and Mandatory Palestine.
- Israel withdrew its forces from 13 villages in Lebanese territory, which were occupied during the war.

=== With Jordan ===
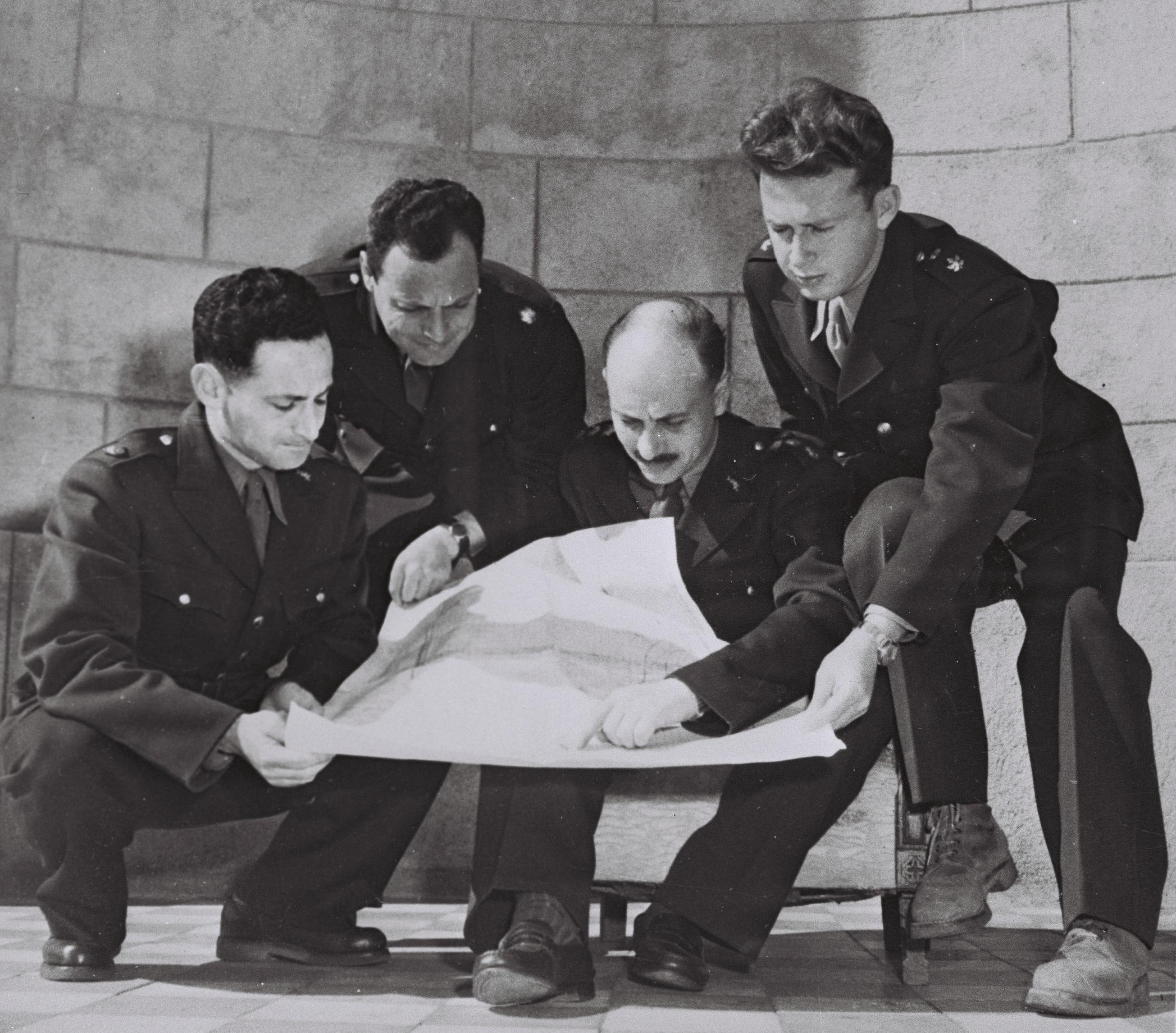
The Israeli delegation to the 1949 Armistice Agreements talks. Left to right: Commanders Yehoshafat Harkabi, Aryeh Simon, Yigael Yadin, and Yitzhak Rabin (1949)

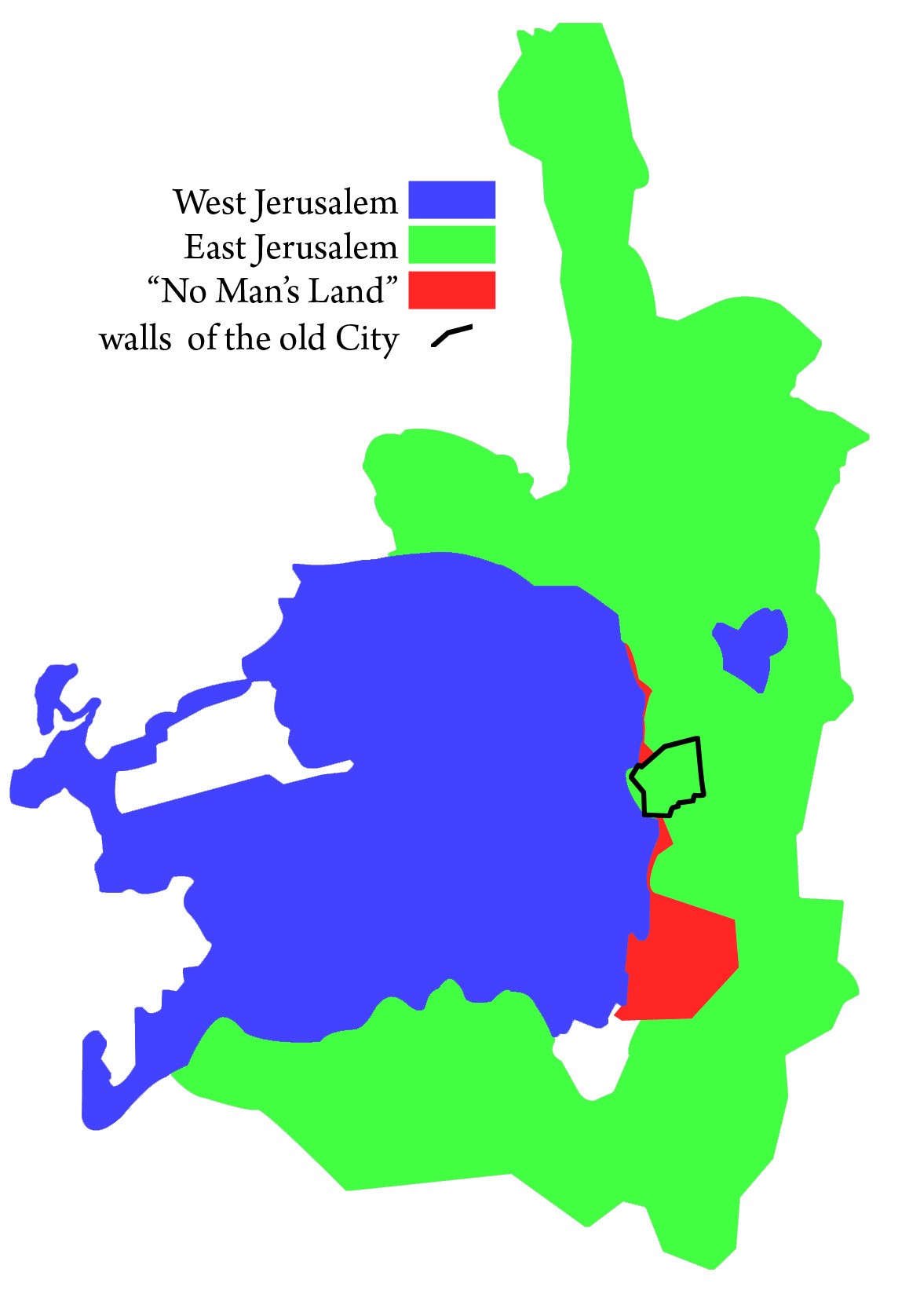
The ceasefire agreement between Israel and Jordan split Jerusalem into "West Jerusalem" under Israeli sovereignty, "East Jerusalem" under Jordanian sovereignty, along with a buffer no man's land region. The blue "West Jerusalem" exclave was the Mount Scopus campus of the Hebrew University. (Note: The map displays the municipal boundaries of Jerusalem as they existed in the first decade of the 21st century. When the agreements were signed in 1949, the municipal area for the city was much smaller.)

These armistice talks began on 4 March, and were conducted on Jordanian territory. Despite the insistence by Ralph Bunche that in all four talks, the ceasefire be strictly observed, while negotiating with Jordan Israel engaged in military operations to occupy extensive swathes of territory in both the central and southern Negev desert. It also managed to secure further land by using the threat of military intervention unless some claims were accepted. The agreement with Jordan was signed on 3 April 1949. The main points:

- No provision of this Agreement shall in any way prejudice the rights, claims and positions of either Party hereto in the ultimate peaceful settlement of the Palestine question, the provisions of this Agreement being dictated exclusively by military considerations.
- Jordanian forces remained in most positions held by them, particularly East Jerusalem which included the Old City.
- Jordan withdrew its forces from their front posts overlooking the Plain of Sharon. In return, Israel agreed to allow Jordanian forces to take over positions previously held by Iraqi forces.
- Exchange of territorial control: Israel received control in the area known as Wadi Ara and the Little Triangle in exchange for territory in the southern hills of Hebron.

In March 1949 as the Iraqi forces withdrew from Palestine and handed over their positions to the smaller Jordanian legion, 3 Israeli brigades maneuvered into positions of advantage in Operation Shin-Tav-Shin and Operation Uvda. The operations allowed Israel to renegotiate the cease fire line in the southern Negev (giving access to the Red Sea) and the Wadi Ara area in a secret agreement reached on 23 March 1949 and incorporated into the General Armistice Agreement. The Green Line was then redrawn in blue ink on the southern map to give the impression that a shift of the Green Line had been made. The events that led to a change in the Green Line was an exchange of fertile land in the Bethlehem area to Israeli control and the village of Wadi Fukin being given to Jordanian control. On 15 July when the Israeli Army expelled the population of Wadi Fukin after the village had been transferred to the Israeli-occupied area under the terms of the Armistice Agreement concluded between Israel and the Jordan Kingdom the Mixed Armistice Commission decided on 31 August, by a majority vote, that Israel had violated the Armistice Agreement by expelling villagers across the demarcation line and decided that the villagers should be allowed to return to their homes. However, when the villagers returned to Wadi Fukin under the supervision of the United Nations observers on September 6, they found most of their houses destroyed and were again compelled by the Israeli Army to return to Jordanian controlled territory.

The United Nations Chairman of the Mixed Commission, Colonel Garrison B. Coverdale (US), pressed for a solution of this issue to be found in the Mixed Armistice Commission, in an amicable and UN spirit. After some hesitation, this procedure was accepted and finally an agreement was reached whereby the Armistice Demarcation Line was changed to place Wadi Fukin under Jordanian authority who, in turn, agreed to transfer of some uninhabited, but fertile territory south of Bethlehem to Israel control.

- A Special Committee was to be formed to make arrangements for safe movement of traffic between Jerusalem and Mount Scopus campus of Hebrew University, along the Latrun-Jerusalem Highway, free access to the Holy Places, and other matters.

=== With Syria ===
1949 ceasefire lines separating Israel from Syrian in relation to other historical boundaries (both before and after 1949)

Armistice talks with Syria started at Gesher B'not Yaacov, on the River Jordan, in April 1949, after the other armistice agreements had been concluded. The agreement with Syria was signed on 20 July 1949.

Syria withdrew its forces from most of the territories it controlled west of the international border, which became demilitarized zones. The territory retained by Syria that lay west of the 1923 Palestinian Mandate border and which had been allocated to the Jewish state under the UN partition plan comprised 66 square kilometers in the Jordan Valley. These territories were designated demilitarized zones (DMZs) and remained under Syrian control. It was emphasised that the armistice line was "not to be interpreted as having any relation whatsoever to ultimate territorial arrangements." (Article V)

== Iraq ==
Iraq, whose forces took an active part in the war (although it has no common border with Israel), withdrew its forces from the region in March 1949. The front occupied by Iraqi forces was covered by the armistice agreement between Israel and Jordan, and there was no separate agreement with Iraq.

== Cease-fire line vs permanent border ==
The new military frontiers for Israel, as set by the agreements, encompassed about 78% of mandatory Palestine as it stood after the independence of Transjordan (now Jordan) in 1946. The Arab populated areas not controlled by Israel prior to 1967 were the Jordanian ruled West Bank and the Egyptian occupied Gaza Strip.

The armistice agreements were intended to serve only as interim agreements until replaced by permanent peace treaties. However, it took three decades to achieve a peace treaty between Israel and Egypt, and it took another 15 years after that to achieve a peace treaty between Israel and Jordan. To this day, no peace treaty has been signed between Israel and Lebanon (Note: A peace treaty between Israel and Lebanon was signed in 1983, but it was nullified by Lebanon within 10 months.) nor between Israel and Syria.

The armistice agreements were clear (at Arab insistence) that they were not creating permanent borders. The Egyptian-Israeli agreement stated "The Armistice Demarcation Line is not to be construed in any sense as a political or territorial boundary, and is delineated without prejudice to rights, claims and positions of either Party to the Armistice as regards ultimate settlement of the Palestine question."

The Jordanian-Israeli agreement stated: "... no provision of this Agreement shall in any way prejudice the rights, claims, and positions of either Party hereto in the peaceful settlement of the Palestine questions, the provisions of this Agreement being dictated exclusively by military considerations" (Art. II.2), "The Armistice Demarcation Lines defined in articles V and VI of this Agreement are agreed upon by the Parties without prejudice to future territorial settlements or boundary lines or to claims of either Party relating thereto." (Art. VI.9)

As the Armistice Demarcation Lines were technically not borders, the Arabs considered that Israel was restricted in its rights to develop the DMZ and exploitation of the water resources. Further that as a state of war still existed with the Arab nations, the Arab League was not hindered in their right to deny Israel the freedom of navigation through the Arab League waters. Also it was argued that the Palestinians had the right of return and that the Israeli use of abandoned property was therefore not legitimate.

In the Knesset then Foreign Minister and future Prime Minister Moshe Sharett called the armistice lines "provisional boundaries" and the old international borders which the armistice lines, except with Jordan, were based on, "natural boundaries". Israel did not lay claim to territory beyond them and proposed them, with minor modifications except at Gaza, as the basis of permanent political frontiers at the Lausanne Conference of 1949.

After the 1967 Six-Day War several Israeli leaders argued against turning the Armistice Demarcation Lines into permanent borders on the grounds of Israeli security:

- Prime Minister Golda Meir said the pre-1967 borders were so dangerous that it "would be treasonable" for an Israeli leader to accept them (The New York Times, December 23, 1969).
- The Foreign Minister Abba Eban said the pre-1967 borders have "a memory of Auschwitz" (Der Spiegel, November 5, 1969).
- Prime Minister Menachem Begin described a proposal for a retreat to the pre-1967 borders as "national suicide for Israel."

The internationally recognized border between Egypt and Israel was eventually demarcated as part of the Egypt–Israel peace treaty. The border between Israel and Jordan (except for Jordan's border with the post-1967 West Bank) was demarcated as part of the Israel–Jordan peace treaty. This occurred after Jordan had recognized Palestine, which had not declared its borders at the time. In its application for membership to the United Nations, Palestine declared its territory to consist of the West Bank and Gaza, implying that some of Jordan's previous border with Israel is now with Palestine.

== Violations ==
In each case Mixed Armistice Commissions (MACs) were formed under the auspices of the United Nations Truce Supervision Organization, (UNTSO) which investigated complaints by all parties and made regular reports to the UN Security Council.

As part of its dispute with Syria over use of the Demilitarized Zone created by the Israel-Syria Armistice Agreement, Israel from 1951 refused to attend meetings of the Israel/Syria Mixed Armistice Commission. The U.N. Security Council, in its resolution of 18 May 1951, criticized Israel's refusal to participate in Mixed Armistice Commission meetings as being "inconsistent with the objectives and intent of the Armistice Agreement".

The discussion of complaints by the Hashemite Kingdom of Jordan/Israel Mixed Armistice Commission during the year 1952 resulted in:

1. Jordan being condemned for 19 violations of the General Armistice Agreement;
2. Israel being condemned for 12 violations of the General Armistice Agreement;

Statistics Taken from The Official Records of The Hashemite Kingdom of Jordan/Israel Mixed Armistice Commission Period from 1 January 1953 Through 15 October 1953:

- The discussion of the 171 Israeli complaints by the Mixed Armistice Commission resulted in Jordan being condemned for 20 violations of the General Armistice Agreement.
- The discussion of the 161 Jordanian complaints by the Mixed Armistice Commission resulted in Israel being condemned for 21 violations of the General Armistice Agreement.

=== Specific incidents ===
Boundaries defined in the 1947 UN Partition Plan for Palestine: Area assigned for a Jewish state Area assigned for an Arab state Planned Corpus separatum with the intention that Jerusalem would be neither Jewish nor Arab Armistice Demarcation Lines of 1949 (Green Line): Israel per 1949 armistice lines West Jerusalem and other areas under Israeli control from 1949 Gaza and the West Bank (including East Jerusalem) under Egyptian and Jordanian control till 1967

On 28–29 January 1953 Israeli military forces estimated at 120 to 150 men, using 2-inch (51 mm) mortars, 3-inch mortars, PIAT weapons, bangalore torpedoes, machine-guns, grenades and small arms, crossed the demarcation line and attacked the Arab villages of Falameh (Falāma, Falamya) and Rantis. At Falameh the mukhtar was killed, seven other villagers were wounded, and three houses were demolished. The attack lasted four and a half hours. Israel was condemned for this act by the Mixed Armistice Commission.

22 April 1953, firing broke out at sunset within Jerusalem along the demarcation line on a length of about 4 kilometres. It lasted two hours, until the cease-fire arranged by United Nations observers came into effect. On the following day, there were isolated shots in the early morning and in the afternoon. There were twenty Jordanian casualties—ten killed and ten wounded. Six Israelis were wounded. The Jerusalem incident was investigated by United Nations observers. After studying the evidence collected, General Riley, in a report to the Security Council on the violation of the cease-fire [S/3607], stated that it appeared impossible to determine who fired the first shot.

On 25, 26, and 27 May, the two parties submitted complaints alleging violation of the General Armistice Agreement by civilians and military personnel in the Al-Dawayima area. In an emergency meeting of the Mixed Armistice Commission, both parties agreed to a mixed investigation. United Nations observers accompanied the representatives to the demarcation line to establish the facts. Despite the cease-fire which had been previously arranged, heavy firing broke out during the investigation. Israel troops had fired across the demarcation line at Jordanians in Jordan territory in response to illegal border trespassing by Jordanian farmers and Israeli soldiers were suspected to have burned crops in Jordan territory. The origin of the incident was the illegal cultivation by Jordanians of land in Israel territory. Armed Jordanians had penetrated Israel territory to harvest crops, and other Jordanians had fired across the demarcation line to protect the harvesters. The Jordanian government took no action to encourage or prevent the actions taken, though later considerations were made.

During the latter part of May 1953, incidents took place which cost the lives of three persons and in which six others were wounded. On the night of 25–26 May, an armed group from Jordan attacked two homes in Beit Arif, wounding two women. The same night, armed Jordanians attacked a home in Beit Nabala, killing a woman and wounding her husband and two children. Jordan was condemned for all three of these attacks. On the night of 9 June, armed Jordanians blew up a house in Tirat Yehuda, killing one man, and two nights later an armed band struck at a house in Kfar Hess, killing a woman and seriously wounding her husband. Jordan was again condemned by the Mixed Armistice Commission for these attacks. Both governments were greatly concerned over the happenings during this fortnight, and a great effort was made to stop the work of these groups, which seemed bent on creating tension along the border.

11 August 1953, Israel military forces using demolition mines, bangalore torpedoes, 2-inch mortars, machine-guns and small arms attacked the villages of Idna, Surif and Wadi Fukin, inflicting casualties among the inhabitants and destroying dwellings. The body of an Israel soldier in full uniform with identification tag was found in the village of Idna after the attack. The Mixed Armistice Commission condemned Israel for these attacks.

2 September 1953: Arabs, infiltrated from Jordan, reached the neighbourhood of Katamon, in the heart of Jerusalem where they threw hand grenades in all directions. Miraculously, no one was hurt.

3 September 1953: Sovereignty over the DMZ (Demarcation Zone) between Syria Israel is questioned when Israel start a creeping border attempt by using a water diversion in DMZ; USA threatens to end aid channelled to Israel by the Foreign Operations Administration. Israel moves intake out of DMZ.

In September 1953 the General Headquarters orders Unit 101 to drive Bedouins out from the Negev and push them southward to Sinai. Unit 101 soldiers act aggressively: they raid the Bedouin camp, shooting aimlessly, confiscating arms and burning tents. The Bedouins run away, leaving many wounded behind. For a few days Unit 101 pursuits the Bedouins until they are out of the Negev.

2 October 1953: The explosion of a land mine on the Israel railway north of Eyal derailed an Israel freight train. The Mixed Armistice Commission has held Jordan responsible for this act of violence which fortunately caused no loss of life and relatively little damage, as the train was made up of empty tank cars.

14 October 1953: Qibya massacre – 130 Israeli troops crossed the demarcation line into Qibya village, attacking the inhabitants by firing from automatic weapons and explosives. Forty-one dwelling houses and a school building were destroyed. Resulting in the murder of forty-two lives and the wounding of fifteen persons and the damage of a police car, and at the same time, the crossing of a part of the same group into Shuqba village, breaching article III, paragraph 2 of the General Armistice Agreement. A number of unexploded hand grenades, marked with Hebrew letters and three bags of TNT were found in and about the village.

24 November 1953: Resolution 101 the Security Council is passed which "took note of the fact that there is substantial evidence of crossing of the demarcation line by unauthorized persons, ten resulting in acts of violence and requests the Government of Jordan to continue and strengthen the measures which they are already taking to prevent such crossing." The Security Council condemned Israel for the operation in Qibya.

December 1953: The Jordanian authorities carried out the following measures:-

- (a) Increase of the number of Jordanian police assigned to the border area;
- (b) Increase of the number of patrols of the Jordanian border by Jordanian forces;
- (c) Replacement of village mukhtars and area commanders, where laxity of border control was suspected;
- (d) Removal from the border area of suspected infiltrators and imposing of heavy sentences on known infiltrators;

16 December 1953, two Israeli soldiers were killed while on patrol inside Israel territory (approximate M. R. 1433–1097). On 21 December, the Mixed Armistice Commission condemned Jordan for this incident.

18 December 1953, a car was ambushed on the Hebron road (approximate M.R. 1658–1221) inside Jordan and an Arab Legion medical officer was killed. Israel was condemned by the Mixed Armistice Commission for this incident (21 December).

21 December 1953, an armed group attacked a Bedouin camp near Tarqumyia (approximate M.R. 1512–1092) wounding one man. Israel was condemned by the Mixed Armistice Commission for this incident (23 December).

21 December, an armed group, using explosives and automatic weapons, attacked a house near Hebron (approximate M.R. 1591–1066) killing one pregnant woman and two men, and wounding another man. Israel was condemned for this incident (24 December). The last three incidents were apparently reprisal attacks for the killing of the two Israeli soldiers on 16 December. Two Arabs responsible for this crime were arrested by the Jordan police a few days later.

14 February 1954, an Israeli villager on guard duty at Mahasyia, near Deiraban, (approximate M. R. 1510–1282) in the central area, was killed. No evidence was introduced to indicate that Jordanians were guilty of this crime and on 18 February the chairman voted against the Israeli draft resolution condemning Jordan.

17 February 1954: the Israel delegation complained that five armed persons dressed in khaki crossed the demarcation line during the night and, on the morning of 16 February, stole a flock of 260 sheep belonging to an Israeli kibbutz. According to the complaint, the Israeli shepherd and his flock were taken into caves and kept there till 5.30 p.m. when the shepherd was released and the marauders returned to the Gaza Strip with the flock crossing the demarcation line at M.R. 1067–1024. The Israel delegation considered that "the above was a carefully planned action ordered by the Egyptian authorities and carried out by a well-trained military unit."

17 February 1954: the Israel delegation complained that two Arabs crossed the demarcation line into Israel at M.R. 1018–0992, on 16 February. According to the complaint, they started to escape when challenged by Israeli guards, and fire having been opened on them, one was hit and was dragged over the demarcation line by the second.

18 February, the Mixed Armistice Commission condemned Israel and Jordan for firing across the demarcation line on 14 February near Deir el Ghusun (approximate M. R. 1575–1955) in the northern area. This firing resulted in the killing, of one Jordanian.

18 February: the Israel delegation complained that on 18 February at 1 p.m. two armed Egyptian soldiers crossed the demarcation line at M.R. 10884–10486. According to the complaint, the Egyptian soldiers refused to stop, when challenged by an Israeli patrol; two warning shots were fired; one of the Egyptian soldieries escaped, and the other was killed 15 meters inside Israel territory

18 February: the Israel delegation complained that on 18 February four armed infiltrators crossed the demarcation line into Israel and that when challenged by an Israel patrol at M.R. 1023–1123 they started to escape while firing on the patrol. During the exchange of fire one of the infiltrators was killed.

19 February: the Egyptian delegation complained that on 18 February, at M.R. 1087–1050, a patrol of two Egyptian soldiers in Egyptian territory was attacked by armed Israelis hiding in ambush. One of the Egyptian soldiers was kidnapped and killed inside Israel-controlled territory, close to the demarcation line (Cf. sub-paragraph (c) above summarizing an Israeli complaint dated 18 February).

19 February: the Egyptian delegation complained that on 19 February armed Israelis opened automatic fire across the demarcation line at an Arab working in his field at M.R. 0952–0931. The Arab was seriously injured.

24 February: One Arab was reported killed and another wounded by the Egyptian delegation.

16 March 1954, Israelis of the Ein Gev colony began ploughing 130 dunums of land situated near the colony and belonging to the Arab population of demilitarised Nuqeib, in violation of the verbal agreement concluded at Samara in 1950 to the effect that the two parties should retain and work the said land until the problem was settled.

17 March 1954: Ma'ale Akrabim massacre [Scorpion Pass]. Terrorists ambushed a bus traveling from Eilat to Tel Aviv, and opened fire at short range when the bus reached the area of Maale Akrabim in the northern Negev. In the initial ambush, the terrorists killed the driver and wounded most of the passengers. The terrorists then boarded the bus, and shot each passenger, one by one. Eleven passengers were murdered. Survivors recounted how the murderers spat on the bodies and abused them. The Israeli claimed that the terrorists could clearly be traced back to the Jordanian border, some 20 km from the site of the terrorist attack. The MAC investigation found that the claim could not be substantiated and that the attack was more likely to have been by Bedu tribesman from within Israel and the Israeli complaint was not upheld.

23 March 1954: The Israel Government has severed all connections with the Mixed Armistice Commission. It has also discontinued attendance at the local commanders' meetings provided for under a separate Israel-Jordan agreement. Israel communications referring to alleged violations by Jordan of the General Armistice Agreement have been addressed to the Secretary-General of the United Nations, with the request that they should be circulated to the members of the Security Council. The Chief of Staff of the Truce Supervision Organization in Jerusalem has been informed of such alleged violations of the General Armistice Agreement only on receiving from New York a copy of the Security Council document. The non-co-operation of the Israel Government has prevented the investigation of such alleged violations in conformity with the provisions of the General Armistice Agreement.

On 29 March 1954, at 07.00 hours, local time, the Jordanian delegation presented to the Chairman of the Mixed Armistice Commission a verbal complaint dealing with an incident which had occurred on 29 March 1954 at 07.00 hours, local time, at Nahhalin village, some 35 kilometers from the demarcation line "an Israel armed force, well equipped, surrounded the village from three directions and penetrated inside the village and opened fire from different automatic weapons, threw hand-grenades and placed mines at some houses, including the mosque of the village. As a result of this brutal attack, 9 persons—8 men and 1 woman—were killed, and 14 others were injured and taken to hospital. Fire lasted for about one hour and a half, and was returned by the village guards. Then the aggressors withdrew. Mines, grenades and other warlike materials bearing Hebrew markings were found on the spot. This complaint was upheld by the Mixed Armistice Commission

30 June 1954, two Israeli armoured launchers attacked the Syrian post of El Koursi, situated on Syrian soil, with their 20-mm. and 57-mm. guns, this time with the support of Israel field artillery sited in the defensive area. This artillery continued firing for approximately one hour and 45 minutes, causing material damage to the post.

5 December 1954, at approximately 16.30 hours, a group of 8 armed Israel State policemen stationed approximately at MR 209600 233400 opened fire on two Arab farmers at approximately MR 209600 233450 in the southern demilitarised zone (Tawafiq). The fire was returned by the two Arabs. One of them was hit by a bullet and immediately taken to hospital. The MAC Decided that the presence of a regular Israel police force in the southern demilitarised zone is a flagrant violation of article V of the General Armistice Agreement and requested that the Israel authorities to pay to the wounded Arab civilian an appropriate compensation.

A list of 29 complaints are alleged in the 27 October 1953 Report by the Chief of Staff of the Truce Supervision Organization. See appendix I, II and II for a tabulated list of Israel and Jordanian complaints to the MAC the number of condemnations given to each country as a result of MAC investigations infractions of the agreement by Jordan was submitted on April 6, 1954. These alleged infractions included alleged Jordanian attacks on an Israeli civilian bus, killing 11 people (see 17 March above), attacks on Israeli farmers and Bedouin shepherds, sniping at Israeli civilians from the Old City of Jerusalem, kidnappings, shooting at civilian aircraft, ambushing roads and laying mines. In violation of the agreements, the Jordanians denied Jewish access to the holy places in Jerusalem, prohibited visits to Rachel's Tomb and vandalized the Jewish cemetery on the Mount of Olives, using tombstones for construction of pavements and latrines. The 'Uja al-Hafeer demilitarized zone on the Israeli-Egyptian border was the site of numerous border incidents and armistice violations. In September 1955, Ariel Sharon's paratroopers entered the United Nation sector of the demilitarized zone. Benny Morris writes that Sharon "didn't realize that the UN area was off limits for his men." On May 28, 1958, Israel reported a shooting incident in the demilitarized zone on Mount Scopus in which 4 Israel police officers patrolling the botanical gardens of the Hebrew University of Jerusalem, along with the United Nations observer sent to extricate them, were killed by Jordanian fire from Issawiya. Israel sent soldiers into Jordanian territory to conduct raids in retaliation for incursions by armed persons into Israel. From their positions on the Golan Heights Syrian forces shelled Israeli settlements in the demilitarized zone, attacked fishing boats on the Kinneret and fired on agricultural workers.

== See also ==
- 1947–1948 civil war in Mandatory Palestine
- 1948 Arab–Israeli War
- Arab–Israeli conflict
- Blue Line
- Israeli–Palestinian peace process
- United Nations Conciliation Commission for Palestine
- United Nations Partition Plan for Palestine

=== Arab–Israeli peace diplomacy and treaties ===
- 2000 Camp David Summit
- Arab–Israeli peace projects
- Camp David Accords
- Egypt–Israel peace treaty (1979)
- Faisal–Weizmann agreement (1919)
- International law and the Arab–Israeli conflict
- Israel–Jordan peace treaty (1994)
- List of Middle East peace proposals
- Madrid Conference of 1991
- May 17 Agreement (1983)
- Oslo Accords (1993)
- Paris Peace Conference (1919–1920)

== Texts ==
The complete texts of the Armistice Agreements can be found at The Avalon Project at Yale Law School

- Egyptian-Israeli General Armistice Agreement, February 24, 1949
- Jordanian-Israeli General Armistice Agreement, April 3, 1949
- Lebanese-Israeli General Armistice Agreement, March 23, 1949
- Israeli-Syrian General Armistice Agreement, July 20, 1949

A search at the United Nations web site for "Mixed Armistice Commission" will reveal many of the reports made to the UN by those commissions.
