= Mandelbaum Gate =

Former checkpoint between the Israeli and Jordanian sectors of Jerusalem

Coordinates: 31°47′14.94″N 35°13′36.53″E

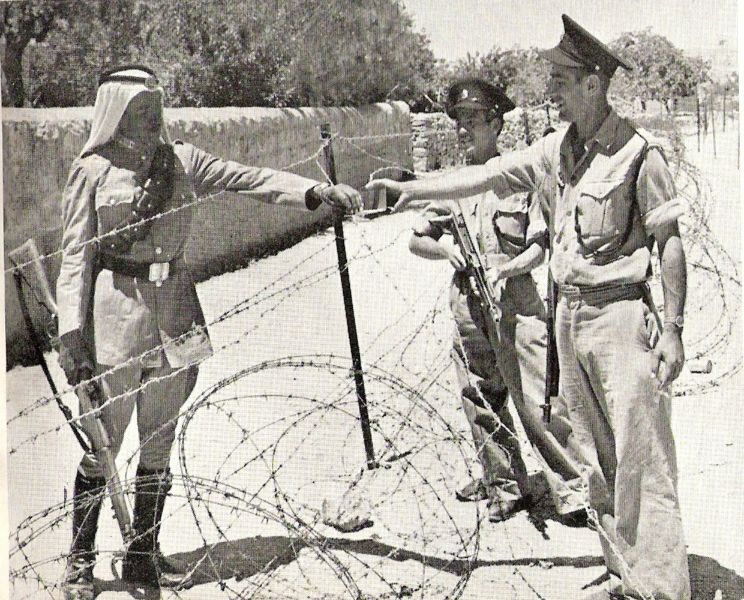
Israeli policemen meet a Jordanian legionnaire near the Mandelbaum Gate

The Mandelbaum Gate is a former checkpoint between the Israeli and Jordanian sectors of Jerusalem, just north of the western edge of the Old City along the Green Line. The first checkpoint for the Hashemite Kingdom of Jordan/Israel Mixed Armistice Commission at the Mandelbaum Gate, from the close of the 1948 Arab–Israeli War in 1949 until August 1952, was moved from the Israeli side of the Gate to the Demilitarised Zone after the "Barrel Incident". The second checkpoint existed until the 1967 Six-Day War. The Gate became a symbol of the divided status of the city.

== History ==
=== Mandelbaum House ===
The crossing was named after the Mandelbaum House, a three-story building that stood at that location from 1927 to 1948. The house was built by a Jewish merchant named Simcha Mandelbaum, who had raised his ten children in the Old City but who needed a home with more space to accommodate his married children and guests. Rather than build in more populated areas like Jaffa Road or Rehavia, he chose to build on a lot at the end of Shmuel HaNavi Street, near the location of the Third Wall from the time of King Agrippas. Although Mandelbaum wanted to set an example for other Jews to build in the area and expand Jerusalem's northern boundary, the Waqf owned large tracts in the area and forbade Arabs from selling any more land to Jews, so the house stood alone. During the uprisings of 1929 and 1936, the Haganah Israeli paramilitary group took up positions in the house to drive back the Arabs leaving Damascus Gate toward the Mea Shearim and Beit Yisrael neighborhoods.

During the 1948 Arab–Israeli war, the Mandelbaum House stood between the Jewish neighborhoods and the area under Jordanian control. Mandelbaum's widow, Esther Liba, and her family members abandoned the house on less than a day's notice after being asked to do so by the Haganah. The Haganah then took up residency and repelled Jordanian attacks in the surrounding neighborhoods until a cease-fire was signed. During this period the roof of the house was "protected" by painted plywood cutouts designed to look from above like anti-aircraft guns. As per the status quo agreement, the house remained on the Israeli side. In July 1948, the Jordanians attacked the house with a huge quantity of explosives and the building collapsed with 35 Haganah members inside. Part of the front wall with the entry gate remained standing until 1967 as a memorial to the divided Jerusalem. Outside this gate was the official crossing between Israel and Jordan.

A few days after the Six-Day War and the unification of Jerusalem in June 1967, Mayor Teddy Kollek sent in heavy equipment to demolish the remains of the Mandelbaum House. "When a journalist asked him why he committed this act, which was probably beyond his authority to order, he explained that it was a period of chaos in terms of distribution of responsibility, and he did not want to leave this geographic landmark and make the area hefker (abandoned). He was totally unaware of the story behind the house, except for his acquaintance with the Mandelbaum Gate. When asked whether he knew who Mandelbaum had been, he shrugged his shoulders and replied, 'Some German doctor, I think'."

=== Mandelbaum Gate ===
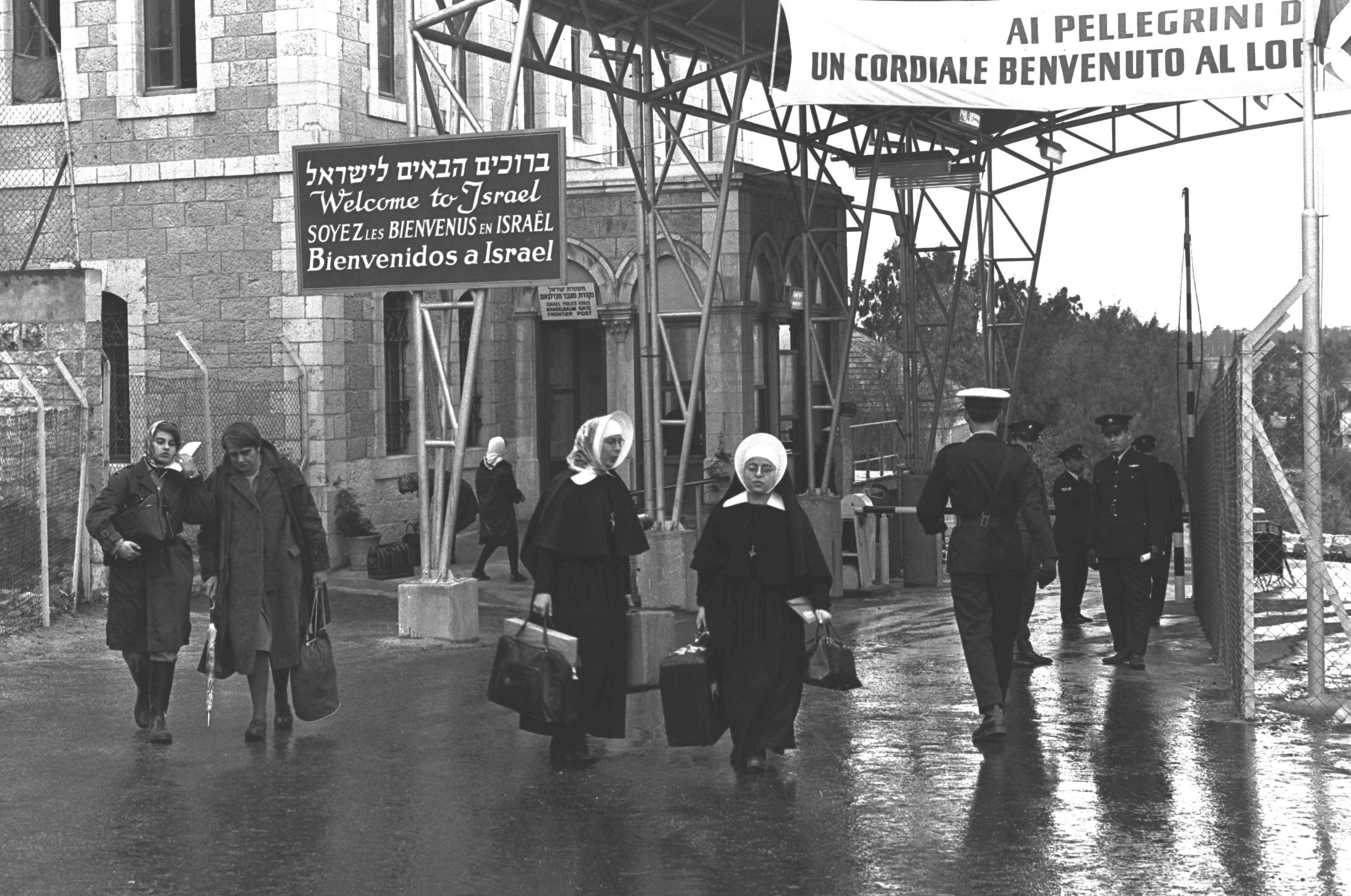
The Mandelbaum Gate in operation, 1955

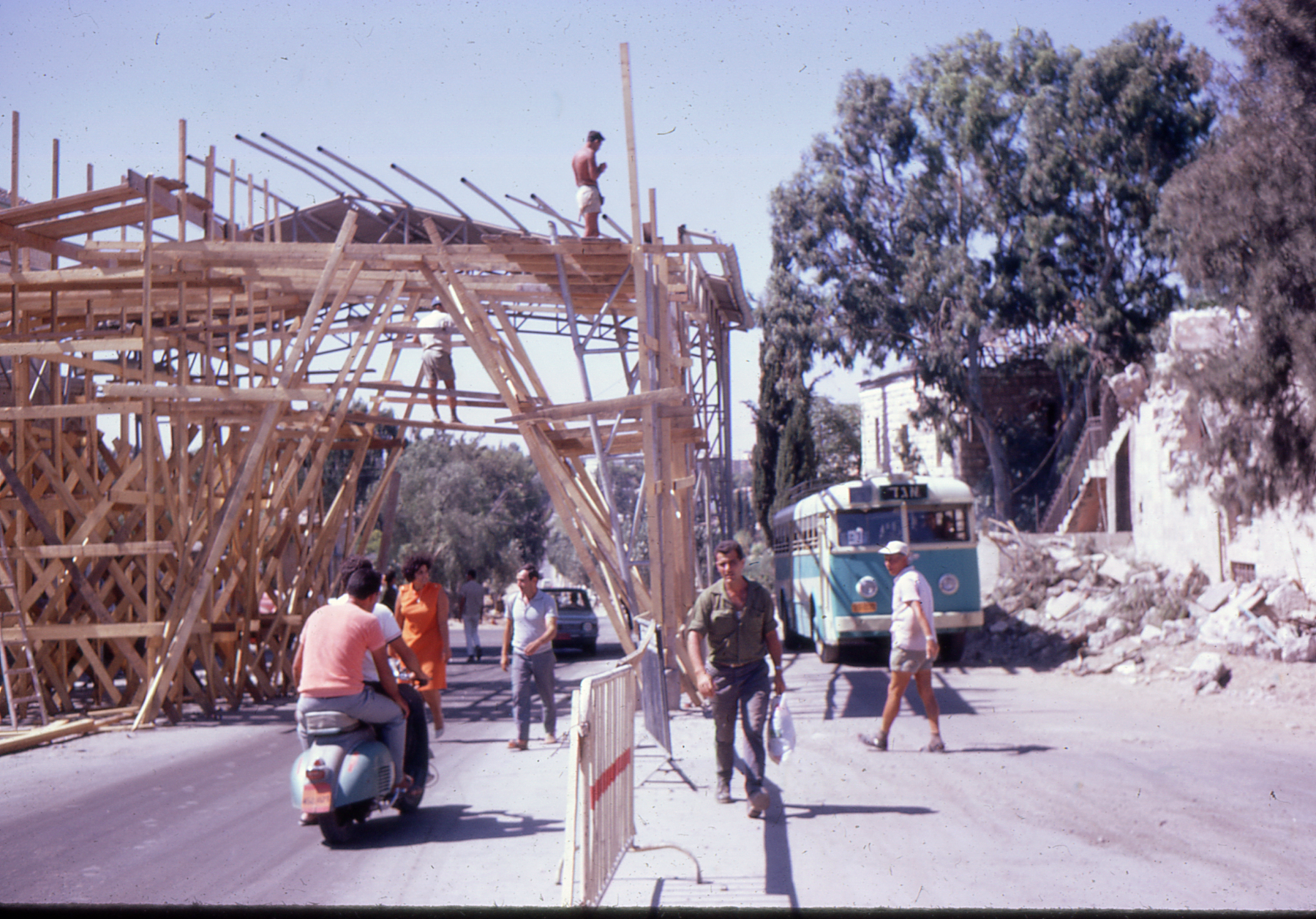
Dismantling the Mandelbaum Gate

The location of the checkpoint was determined by the entrance into the city of the Anglo-Jordanian Arab Legion following the withdrawal of British troops in May 1948. The Jordanians pushed Jewish defenders west and out of the Sheikh Jarrah area.

Clergy, diplomats and United Nations personnel used the 50-yard (46 m) gateway to pass through the concrete and barbed wire barrier between the sectors, but Jordanian officials allowed only one-way passage for non-official traffic. Anyone with an Israeli stamp in their passport was denied passage. The Jordanians permitted a twice-monthly supply convoy from the Israeli sector to access Jewish property on Mount Scopus, and an annual Christmas crossing for Israeli Christians making a pilgrimage to Bethlehem. In 1964, special arrangements were made for the Israelis to greet Pope Paul VI as he crossed from Jordan to Israel at Mandelbaum Gate. The original sites of Hebrew University and Hadassah Hospital were technically under the protection of the United Nations, but despite the "Mount Scopus agreement", the institutions were not permitted to reopen.

The last person to pass through the Gate was the American journalist Flora Lewis, shortly before the outbreak of the Six-Day War in June 1967. Jordanian forces joined the war on June 5, with a massive bombardment of the Israeli sector of the city.

Israeli forces captured the Jordanian part of Jerusalem within two days and soon tore down the Mandelbaum Gate. Only a historical marker remains.

== See also ==
- "The Mandelbaum Gate" (بوابة مندلباوم), a short story by Emile Habibi (1954)
- The Mandelbaum Gate, a novel by Muriel Spark (1965)
