= Kfar Szold =

Place in Northern Israel

Kfar Szold: כפר סאלד (Hebrew)
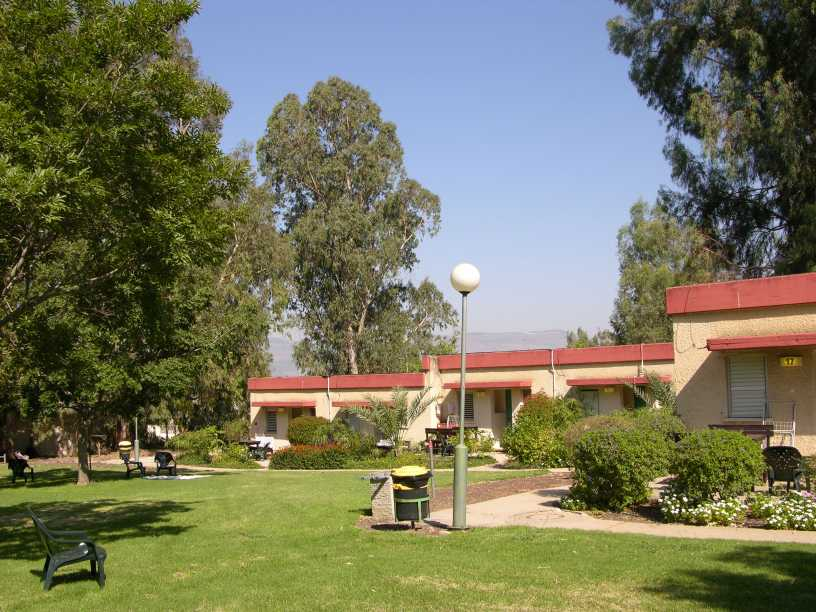

- Location within Northeast Israel
- Coordinates: 33°11′43″N 35°39′27″E
- Country: Israel
- District: Northern
- Subdistrict: Safed
- Council: Upper Galilee
- Affiliation: Kibbutz Movement
- Founded: 13 November 1942
- Founder: Central European Jewish immigrants
- Population (2024): 720

Kfar Szold (Hebrew: כפר סאלד, lit. 'Szold Village') is a kibbutz in northern Israel. Located in the Hula Valley in the Galilee Panhandle, it falls under the jurisdiction of Upper Galilee Regional Council. In 2024 it had a population of 720.

== Archaeology ==
In a 2026 study, historical-geographic research identified the ancient village of Migēramē (Μιγηραμη), recorded in Diocletianic boundary stones, with the microtoponym al-Muqārināt located in Wadi Shimdin, northeast of Kfar Szold. The toponym is believed to have evolved through the phonetic assimilation of the final consonant from M-G-R-M to M-G-R-N'. Archaeological evidence at the site includes ruins and pottery spanning the Middle Bronze II through the Mamluk periods, with a Late Roman phase consistent with the boundary stone inscriptions. This identification suggests a significantly higher degree of toponymic preservation in the northern Hula Valley than previously assumed by scholars.

== History ==
Kfar Szold was founded in the early 1940s by Jewish immigrants from Hungary, Austria and Germany and was named after Henrietta Szold, who founded Hadassah, the Women's Zionist organization. During World War II, she helped rescue children in the Holocaust and transported them to Mandate Palestine, including places such as Kfar Szold.

On 9 January 1948, about 200 Arabs crossed the Syrian border and attacked the kibbutz in reprisal for the Haganah attack on the nearby Palestinian village of al-Khisas a few weeks before. The British Army joined forces with the Jewish defenders, using artillery fire and killing 25 of the attackers.

Prior to the Six-Day War in 1967, Kfar Szold had been a constant target for the Syrian artillery position on the Golan Heights.

Over the years (List of projectile attacks from Lebanon) Katyusha rockets fired by Hezbollah and PLO from Lebanon struck a number of communities in the Hula Valley. The region was also a target of several terrorist infiltrations; one such case happened in kibbutz Misgav-Am.

== Economy ==
The main agricultural products of the kibbutz are apples, citrus fruits, avocados, corn, watermelons and cattle. Alongside agriculture, the kibbutz operates the metal factory Lordan, specialized in heat- and fluid-conducting instruments.

Like many kibbutzim, Kfar Szold has a guesthouse for travelers. The kibbutz also has a sculpture garden.

Since the kibbutz went a process of privatization, several local businesses and services are provided by members.

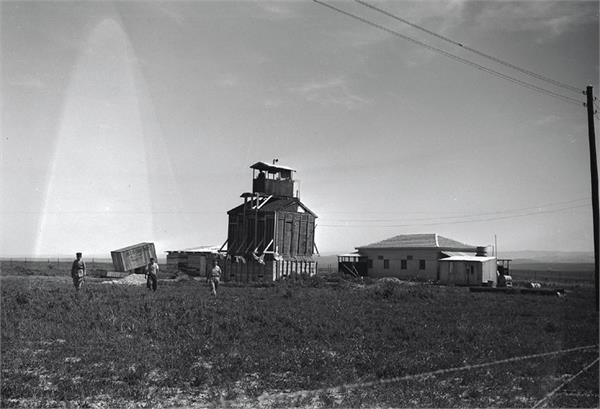
Kfar Szold 1939

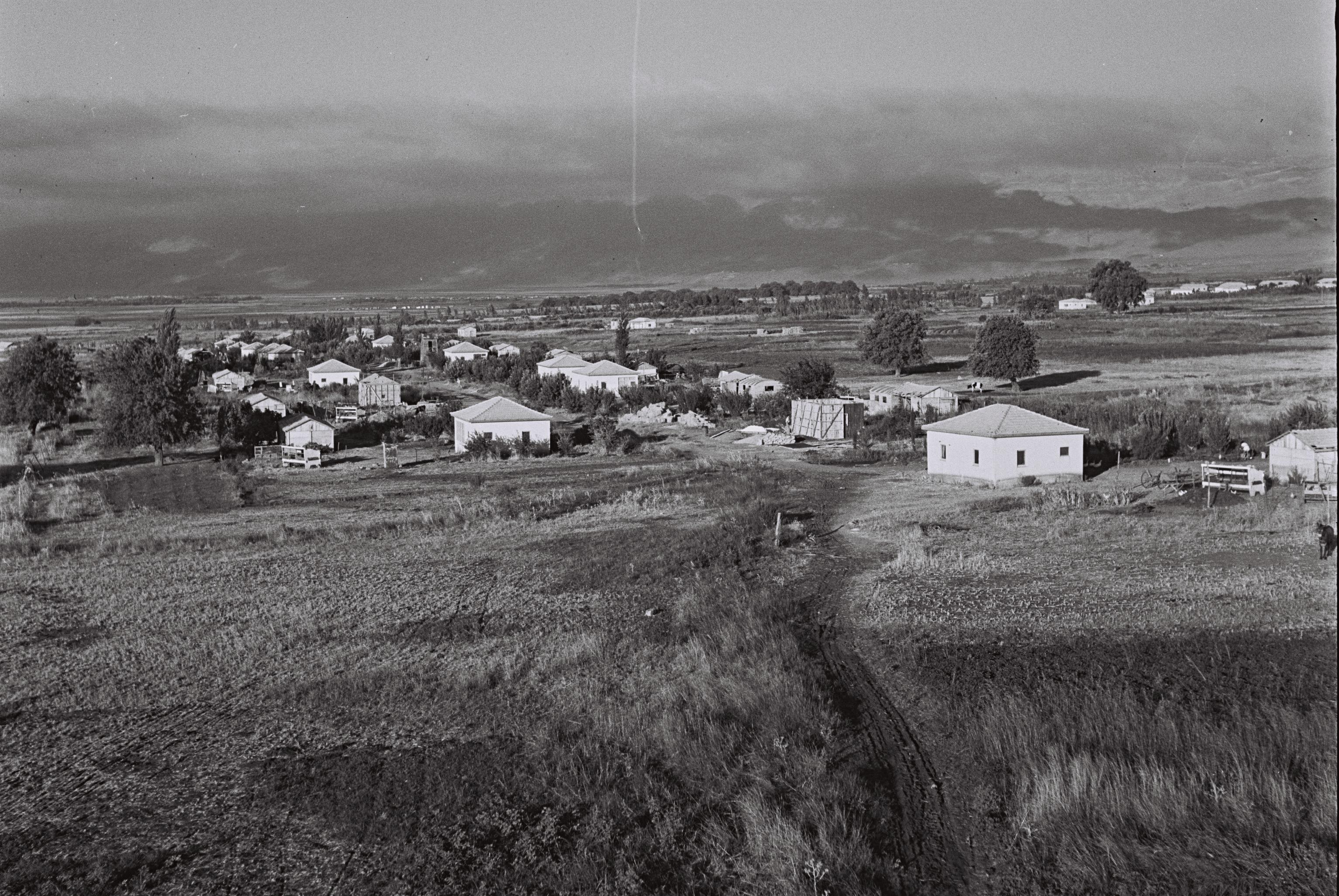
Kfar Szold, 1946

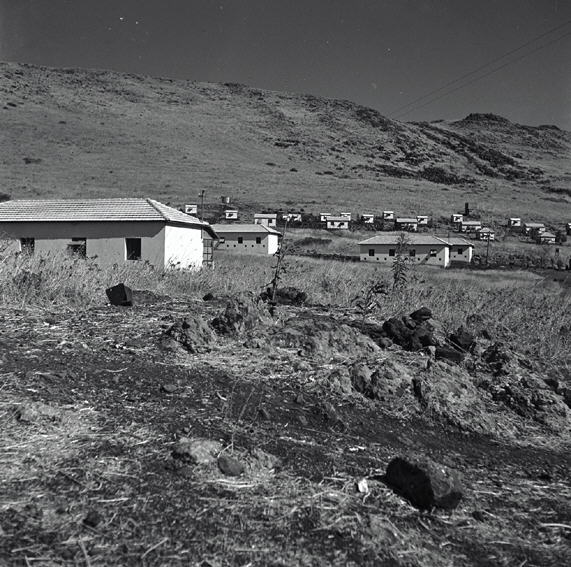
Kfar Szold 1947
