= Al-Khisas raid =

Raid on Arab village, mandatory palestine

- Part of the 1947–1949 Palestine war and the Nakba
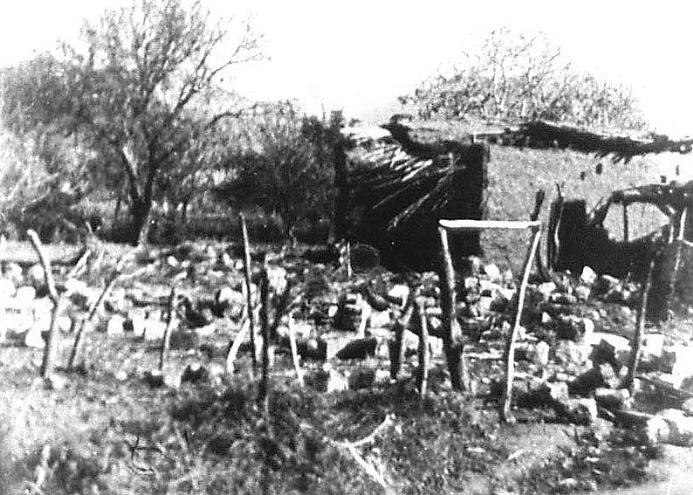
- Remains of a house destroyed in the attack
- Location: 33°13′31″N 35°37′10″E; Al-Khisas, Mandatory Palestine
- Date: 18 December 1947
- Target: Palestinian Arabs
- Attack type: Arson, Massacre
- Deaths: 10-15 villagers, including 5 children
- Perpetrators: Palmach, Haganah

The al-Khisas raid, also known as the al-Khisas massacre, was an attack on the Palestinian village of al-Khisas carried out by the Palmach on December 18, 1947, during the 1948 Palestine war. 10-15 Palestinian villagers were killed in the attack, including 5 children.

== Background ==
The attack took place during the civil war phase of the 1948 Palestine war and was conducted as a reprisal for the killing of a Jewish man near Al-Khisas. (Note: Reports differ as to the details of this killing, with Meron Benvenisti writing that "a horse-cart from an adjacent kibbutz was fired upon while traveling past al-Khisas, and one of the passengers was killed." Benny Morris writes that a Jewish man from kibbutz Ma'ayan Baruch was killed as revenge for the shooting of an Arab a few days prior. (Morris 2004) Saleh Abdel Jawad writes that "a settlement police car was attacked, which killed one man." (Jawad, 2007, Zionist Massacres: the Creation of the Palestinian Refugee Problem in the 1948 War)) Local Palmach commanders decided to launch a retaliatory attack on the village, arguing that "if there was no reaction to the murder, the Arabs would interpret this as a sign of weakness and an invitation to further attacks". The Haganah High Command approved the action on condition that the attack be directed against "men only and they should burn [only] a few houses".

== The attack ==
The massacre was carried out by the Palmach's 3rd Battalion, which later became part of the Yiftach Brigade.

According to Haim Levenberg:

One unit attacked with hand-grenades a four-roomed house killing two men and five children, and wounding five other men. At the same time, another unit attacked a house in the village owned by Amir Al-Fa’ur of Syria, in which one Syrian and two Lebanese peasants were killed and another Lebanese and two local men were wounded. According to HQ British Troops in Palestine, the villagers did not use any firearms to defend themselves.

10-15 Palestinian villagers were killed in the attack, 5 of them children. (Note: Pappé 2006, "Fifteen villagers, including five children, were killed in the attack.") (Note: Benny Morris, 1948 and After (1990), "ten Arab civilians, including five children")

== Aftermath and reactions ==
Following the attack a large number of al-Khisas' residents fled their homes, becoming a part of the 1948 Palestinian expulsion and flight. (Note: Morris 2004, "Following the raid, a large part of Khisas’s population left their homes")

The events led to an escalation in violence that rapidly spread through the Upper Galilee region; the region had generally been quiet before the massacre, which was blamed for unnecessarily widening the hostilities.

The Jewish leadership at the time sharply criticized the attack. Three weeks later, Arab forces crossed the Syrian border and carried out a reprisal attack on the kibbutz Kfar Szold, but suffered heavy losses and were repulsed.

During the operation a female member of the battalion had refused to throw a grenade into a room in which she could hear a child crying; following the event the battalion's commander Moshe Kelman argued that women should not be used on front line duties but should be used as "cooks and service people."

On the night of 5 June 1949, the remaining inhabitants of Khisas were forcibly expelled as part of the 1949–1956 Palestinian expulsions. Some time after the village was destroyed.

== See also ==
- Killings and massacres during the 1948 Palestine war
