= Defence (Emergency) Regulations =

The Defence (Emergency) Regulations are an expansive set of regulations first promulgated by the British authorities in Mandatory Palestine in 1945, The British repealed them before withdrawing from Palestine in 1948. Along with the entire body of Mandate legislation, they were incorporated into Israel's domestic legislation after the state's establishment in 1948, except for provisions explicitly annulled. They remain in force today with many amendments.

The regulations as amended form an important part of the legal system in the West Bank. They permit the establishment of military tribunals to try civilians, prohibitions on the publication of books and newspapers, house demolitions, indefinite administrative detention, extensive powers of search and seizure, the sealing off of territories and the imposition of curfews.

== British Mandate ==
In the midst of the Arab revolt, the British King made the "Palestine (Defence) Order in Council, 1937", authorizing the British High Commissioner in Palestine to enact such regulations "as appear to him in his unfettered discretion to be necessary or expedient for securing public safety, the defence of Palestine, the maintenance of public order and the suppression of mutiny, rebellion, and riot and for maintaining supplies and services essential to the life of the community." In 1945, such regulations as had been introduced, and many others, were declared as the "Defence (Emergency) Regulations, 1945". They consisted of 147 regulations occupying forty-one pages of the Palestine Gazette. Professor Alan Dowty writes that the Regulations reflected the preoccupations of a colonial power facing widespread unrest and the threat of war, and effectively established a regime of martial law.

A major part of the Regulations concerned military courts, which could be established by the chief military commander as he deemed necessary. Such courts could try any person for offences committed under the Regulations. Trials would be conducted summarily by three military officers, with no limits to what evidence could be admitted, and no right of appeal. Police and military officers were given authority, on the basis of a suspicion of a violation of a Regulation, to search any place or person and seize any object. Indefinite detention without trial could be imposed by the High Commissioner or a military commander, and any person could be deported even if they were native-born. Extensive powers of censorship, suspension of civil courts, expropriation of property, closure of businesses, and imposition of curfews were also granted.

Although emergency regulation were first introduced in response to Arab rebellion, they were also used against Jewish militant organizations like the Irgun and to fight illegal immigration of Jews. The Jewish population in Palestine vigorously protested the Regulations after they were first issued. Bernard (Dov) Joseph, who later became the Israeli Minister of Justice, said that the Regulations "deprived [the country] of the elementary protection which the laws of any civilized country afford its inhabitants", while Richard Crossman, a member of the Anglo-American Committee of Inquiry in 1946 concluded that, "Palestine today is a police state."

== Suppressed revocation ==
On 12 May 1948, two days before British rule in Palestine was to come to an end, the British King signed the Palestine (Revocations) Order in Council, 1948, to come into operation on 14 May. The Order revoked a sequence of Orders in Council that included the Order under which the Defence (Emergency) Regulations were issued. Under the Interpretation Ordinance, 1945, the Palestine (Revocations) Order was valid law throughout the territories. However, Ben-Gurion saw that this posed a challenge to the transfer of power and suppressed all news of the revocation. Israelis were not made aware of the revocation until 1985, when human rights lawyer Leah Tsemel presented it as an argument against deportation.

== Israeli law ==
The Defence (Emergency) Regulations along with most of the existing Mandatory law were incorporated into Israeli domestic law by the country's Provisional State Council's first legislative act – a reception statute known as the "Law and Administration Ordinance of 1948". The existing laws were adopted "with such modifications as may result from establishment of the State or its authorities." As such, regulations involving immigration were excluded, and Jews whose entry into Palestine had been illegal were retrospectively legalized, but the rest of the Regulations remain intact except where explicitly annulled or superseded by subsequent Israeli legislation.

Ben-Gurion attempted multiple times to push a bill through the Provisional State Council which would retroactively nullify the Palestine (Revocations) Order. Since the order was unknown to the Provisional State Council, the initial attempts were seen as ambiguous and failed. The nullification was eventually passed in the Knesset in August 1949 as the "Hidden Law Amendment." The Palestine (Revocations) Order was never hidden, but continues to be treated as an invalid, hidden law in Israeli jurisprudence as of 2025.

Initially a few judges refused to apply the Regulations, but the Supreme Court accepted them as part of Israeli law. The Regulations were used against Jews a few times in the early state, for example in order to abolish the underground group Lehi in the wake of the Bernadotte assassination, but their primary use has been against Arabs. They were the basis of the military government imposed on Israeli Arabs from 1950 to 1966. They are also a key part of the legal framework applied in the West Bank today.

Attempts to repeal or partly repeal the Regulations in 1951 and 1966 were unfruitful. In 1951 the Knesset directed the Constitution, Law, and Justice Committee to draft a bill for their repeal; however, this was not enacted, as the military government was still in force. After the cancellation of military rule in 1966, a committee was established to draw up a plan to repeal the regulations, but its work was halted by the Six-Day War.

After the 1967 war, the Israeli military governor in the territories which had been occupied issued orders to the effect that existing domestic law in those places would be continued, and that they included the Defence (Emergency) Regulations, arguing that they were not revoked during the Jordanian or Egyptian administration of those areas and therefore continued to be in effect since 1945. This position was confirmed by the Israel Supreme Court. The regulations became the basis for the Israeli Military Governorate.

There has been significant debate in Israel surrounding the Defence Regulations. While most of the provisions incorporated into Israeli legislation have never been invoked by the executive branch, a few have been and continue to be repeatedly invoked, "precipitating public and legal debates concerning the appropriate balance between security considerations and democratic premises." (See Application section below for more.)

Following the passage of the Counterterrorism Act, 2016 by the Knesset, many of the regulations have been revoked.

== Application ==
The provisions of the Regulations most frequently applied in the occupied territories are those dealing with censorship, address restriction, detention, and deportation, and closure of areas. The context in which they have been invoked is inextricably linked to the Arab–Israeli conflict and has had an impact upon relations between Jews and Arabs in Israel. These provisions of the Regulations are generally invoked much less frequently within Israel itself today than was the case in the past.

The provisions that apply to publishing houses and published materials allow for the summary closure of publications and restrictions on distribution. The military censor can prevent the publication not only of sensitive security material, but anything that is deemed prejudicial to public order.

== See also ==
- Land and Property laws in Israel
- Media of Israel and freedom of the press
- Prevention of Infiltration Law
- Palestinian prisoners in Israel
