= Palestinian return to Israel =

Part of the Israeli–Palestinian conflict

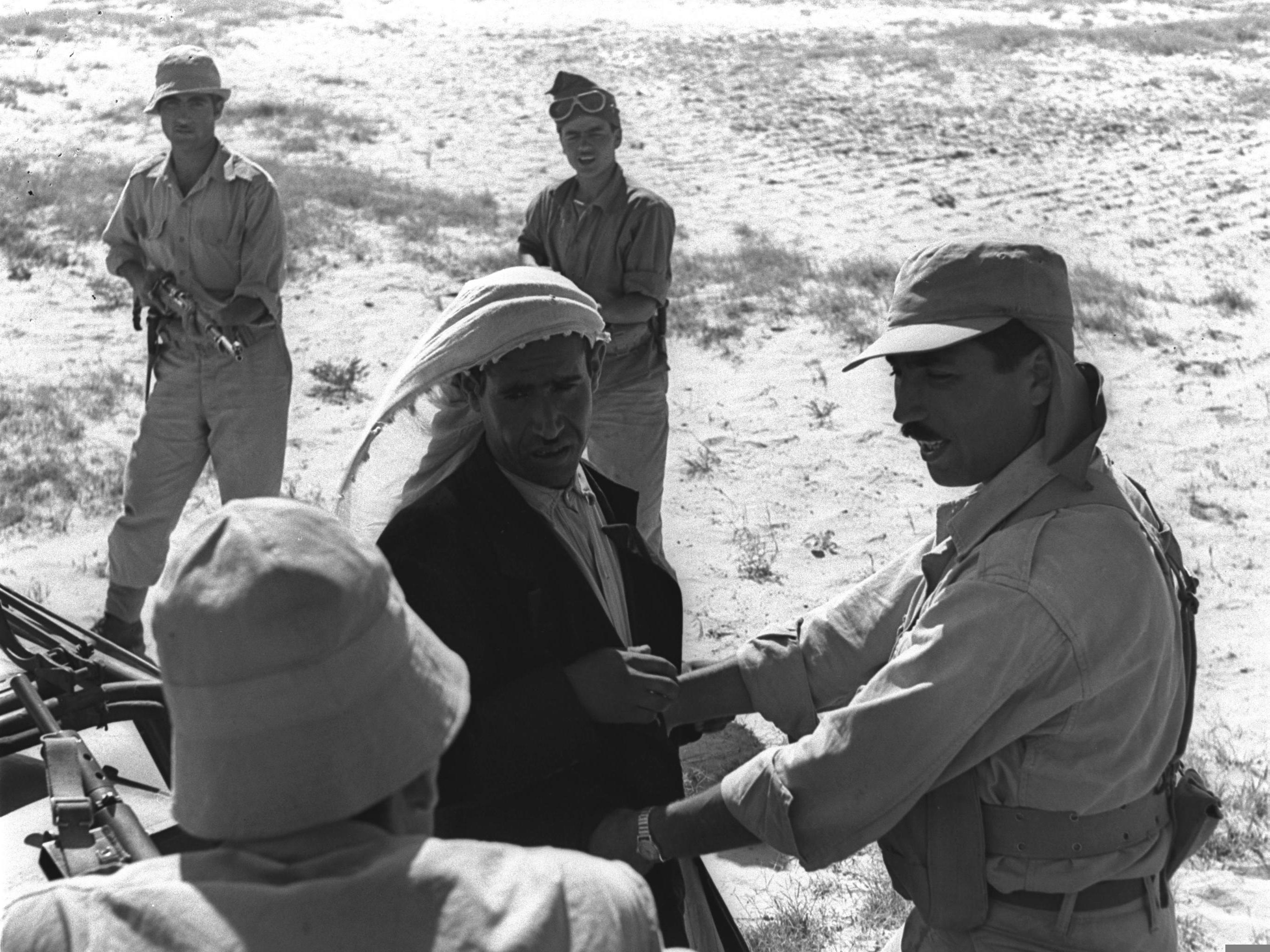
Confrontation between Israeli guards and a Palestinian man attempting to enter Israel from the Egyptian-occupied Gaza Strip, 1954

Following the 1949 Armistice Agreements, which ended the 1948 Arab–Israeli War, many Palestinian Arabs began attempting to cross the Green Line and return to their homes in the recently established State of Israel. Most of these crossings took place from the Jordanian-annexed West Bank and the Egyptian-occupied Gaza Strip, and were largely motivated by dismay among Palestinians who had fled or been expelled from Israeli territory. Although the majority of Palestinian crossers sought to return unarmed to retrieve their belongings or possibly settle among Arab communities in Israel, this period also witnessed the Palestinian Fedayeen insurgency, which was met with Israeli reprisal operations. Approximately 2,700 to 5,000 Palestinians were killed by Israeli troops until the 1956 Arab–Israeli War, when the frequency of these crossings died down significantly.

During the 1967 Arab–Israeli War, Israel captured the West Bank from Jordan and the Gaza Strip from Egypt. A period of mass employment inside of the Israeli-occupied territories was then facilitated by the regular entry of Palestinians into Israel. Nevertheless, the incentive for both sides—higher wages for Palestinian workers in Israel and the growing reliance of the Israeli economy on them—kept conditions relatively stable until the First Intifada (1987–1993), when Palestinian attacks against Israelis prompted Israel to increasingly restrict Palestinian entry into the country. For the next decade, however, as many as 140,000 Palestinians from the occupied territories successfully obtained legal residency in Israel by right of spousal unification, which could be claimed by an Israeli citizen upon marriage to a non-citizen.

The Second Intifada (2000–2005) drastically intensified Israel's policy of separating Israel proper from the occupied territories. In 2003, the Citizenship and Entry into Israel Law made Israeli citizens ineligible to apply for a permit for their Palestinian spouse to immigrate to Israel from the occupied territories. Most notably, while the Gaza Strip barrier had already existed since the 1970s, Israel also constructed the West Bank barrier, which is monitored by built-in military checkpoints and watchtowers to prevent unauthorized Palestinian crossings into Israeli territory. Work permits issued by Israel to Palestinians living under the Palestinian National Authority have generally decreased and are often cancelled entirely during phases of surging violence in the Israeli–Palestinian conflict.

== Israeli policy on Palestinian immigration ==
=== Refugees of the 1948 Arab–Israeli War ===
Israeli policy to prevent the refugees returning to their homes was initially formulated by David Ben-Gurion and Yosef Weitz and formally adopted by the Israeli cabinet in June 1948. In December of that year, the UN General Assembly adopted resolution 194, which resolved "that the refugees wishing to return to their homes and live at peace with their neighbors should be permitted to do so at the earliest practicable date, and that compensation should be paid for the property of those choosing not to return and for loss of or damage to property which, under principles of international law or in equity, should be made good by the Governments or authorities responsible." Despite much of the international community, including American president Harry Truman, insisting that the repatriation of Palestinian refugees was essential, Israel refused to accept the principle. In the intervening years Israel has consistently refused to change its position and has introduced further legislation to hinder Palestinians refugees from returning and reclaiming their land and confiscated property.

In 1950, the Israeli Foreign Ministry published a booklet arguing against the return of Palestinian refugees to the country. It stated that any return of refugees would introduce the problem of a national minority, "which has been almost eliminated by the war".

Yitzhak Pundak, commander of the 6th brigade, later testified:

One day I was summoned to the central front. In the bureau of Maj. Gen. Zvi Ayalon, and in the presence of intelligence officer Binyamin Jibli, I was ordered to liquidate every infiltrator encountered by our forces, and as deterrence to leave the body in the field, to make an example of it. ... When I asked why there was no order in writing, the general and the intelligence officer emphasized that they were speaking in the name of the chief of staff. Gradually the trails filled up with bloated bodies. ... The stench that spread through the area reached our outposts and soldiers started to suffer from headaches, dizziness, nausea and breathing difficulties.

=== Residency permits and settlement ===
Alan Baker, then legal adviser to the Israeli Ministry of Foreign Affairs, said that from 1948 until 2001, Israel allowed about 184,000 Palestinians to settle in Israel. The then deputy minister of the Israeli Ministry of Public Security, Gideon Ezra, said that 57,000 Jordanians came illegally from 1998 to 2001. An expert in the Ministry of Labor said that number is "totally illogical".

== History ==
=== 1949–1956: Palestinian insurgency and Israeli reprisal ===
Palestinian infiltration refers to numerous border-crossings by Palestinians considered illegal by the Israeli authorities, during the first years of Israeli statehood. Most of the people in question were refugees attempting to return to their homes, take back possessions that had been left behind during the war and to gather crops from their former fields and orchards inside the new Israeli state. Between 30,000 and 90,000 Palestinian refugees returned to Israel as a result. Meron Benvenisti states that the fact that the infiltrators were for the most part former inhabitants of the land returning for personal, economic and sentimental reasons was suppressed in Israel as it was feared that this may lead to an understanding of their motives and to the justification of their actions.

The return of Palestinian refugees to take up permanent residence in their homes, or alternatively, if their homes had been destroyed or occupied by Jewish immigrants, to take up residence among still extant Arab communities, was seen as a major problem by the Israeli authorities. They worried that such a return of refugees may reverse the effect of the Palestinian exodus during the 1948 war, which had created a Jewish majority within the borders of Israel and opened up massive amounts of formally Arab-owned land for Jewish settlement.

In 1951, Palestinian infiltrators killed an Israeli teenage girl at her home in Jerusalem. On June 9, 1953, Palestinian infiltrators attacked Hadera and Lod killing a Lod resident. The attacks came just one day after Jordan agreed to prevent armed infiltration to Israel. During June 1953, infiltrators destroyed a house in Mishmar Ayalon. In the same month Palestinian gunmen killed a couple in Kfar Hess. During May 1954, Arab militants attacked an Israeli bus killing its passengers one by one. The attack known as Ma'ale Akrabim massacre, resulted in the death of 11 passengers and according to the testimonies of the survivors, the bodies of the victims were desecrated. During 1955, infiltrators killed two hikers at Judean Hills and a young girl attending a wedding party. In 1956, infiltrators opened fire at a synagogue in the farming community of Shafrir killing three children. Also in the same year, a resident of Ashkelon was killed. During September and October 1956, many Israeli civilians, including four archeologists, were killed in series of attacks.

Israeli leadership came to the conclusion that only retaliatory strikes would be able to create the necessary factor of deterrence, that would convince the Arab armies to prevent infiltration.

This was the cause for the establishment in August 1953 of Unit 101, an elite commando unit specialised in cross border raids. Initially, the Israeli strategy would allow the destruction of civilian targets; however, following the wave of internal and external criticism after the Qibya massacre in October 1953, during which 60–70 Palestinian civilians were killed, the decision was made to confine the strikes to military targets.

During the years 1954–1956, a number of such raids took place. The reprisals led to more Arab hatred and the infiltrations became increasingly more violent, up to the point of the Fedayeen becoming a formal Egyptian Army unit in 1954. The tactical success of the raids led to the establishment of a very unstable balance of threat, which essentially left Israel in a state of border warfare. The resulting strategic dilemma was one of the reasons for Israel's participation in the 1956 Suez Crisis, after which U.N. peacekeepers were positioned in Gaza, and Jordan tightened security over its border.

==== Involvement of Arab countries ====
The Israeli government has accused the Arab governments of supporting and sponsoring the infiltrations, as a means to bring about the collapse of the recently created Israel. The Egyptian formal adoption of the Fedayeen in 1954 seems to support this claim; moreover, Israel points out that after its retaliatory operations, the Arab countries managed to significantly decrease the number of infiltrations by deploying on the borders and by other measures. The non-prevention of armed infiltration (even of non-governmental forces) over an agreed border is widely considered an act of war; therefore Israel argued that their retaliatory strikes, which were also acts of war, were justified.

The terms of the Armistice Agreement restricted Egypt's use and deployment of regular armed forces in the Gaza. The Palestinian border police was created in December 1952. The border police were placed under the command of ‘Abd-al-Man’imi ‘Abd-al-Ra’uf, who was the member of Muslim Brotherhood. 250 Palestinian volunteers started training in March 1953, with further volunteers coming forward for training in May and December 1953. Part of the border police personnel were placed under ‘Abd-al-‘Azim al-Saharti command.

According to Martin Gilbert, towards the end of 1954, the Egyptian government supervised the formal establishment of fedayeen groups in Gaza and the northeastern Sinai. Lela Gilbert in The Jerusalem Post writes that General Mustafa Hafez, appointed by Egyptian president Gamal Abdel Nasser to command Egyptian army intelligence, was the one who founded the Palestinian fedayeen units in Egypt "to launch terrorist raids across Israel's southern border."

In addition, Arab leaders had begun using even harsher rhetoric and condemning Zionism as an ideology, while refusing coexistence or compromise with Israel. On August 31, 1956, Nasser said that:

"Egypt has decided to dispatch her heroes, the disciples of Pharaoh and the sons of Islam and they will cleanse the land of Palestine... There will be no peace on Israel's border because we demand vengeance, and vengeance is Israel's death."

Between 1950 and 1955, 969 Israelis were killed in attacks carried out by infiltrators from Jordan and Egypt.

The Arabs denied support for infiltration. Avi Shlaim (p. 85) writes in an interview with king Hussein of Jordan:

"His puzzlement was all the greater given that the Jordanian authorities had been doing everything that they could 'to prevent infiltration and to prevent access to Israel.'"

Shlaim writes that an Israeli historian and reserve general, Yehoshafat Harkabi, supported this position:

"…having personally made a detailed study of the whole phenomenon of infiltration, he had arrived at the conclusion that Jordanians and especially the [Arab] Legion were doing their best to prevent infiltration, which was a natural, decentralized and sporadic movement." (The Iron Wall p.93, Shlaim)

Other Israeli officials have supported that view. He proceeds by saying that the Israeli claims were unfounded, basing on an interview with an individual named Aryeh Eilan, who is described as an official in the Israeli Ministry of Exterior:

"If Jordanian complicity is a lie, we have to keep lying. If there is no proofs, we have to fabricate them" (Israel's Border Wars p.67, Benny Morris)

Glubb Pasha, the British officer who commanded the Jordan Arab Legion at the time, wrote that

"the Arab Legion was doing its level best to maintain a peaceful border with Israel". (A Soldier with the Arabs 1957, Glubb and Violence of the Jordan-Israel Border: A Jordanian View, Foreign Affairs, 32, no.4, 1954)

A number of documents captured by Israel during the Six-Day War were publicized, such as a letter from the minister of defence wrote to the prime minister demanding drastic steps to prevent infiltration, dated 27 February 1952.

Morris (Righteous Victims p. 270) concludes that:

…the Arab authorities operated with insufficient vigor and means. Often infiltrators and local civil and military authorities collaborated. Many of the latter turned a blind eye in return for bribes, especially the men of the Jordanian National Guard."

=== 1967–1993: Palestinian workers in Israel ===
The armistice line separating Israel from the Israeli-occupied West Bank remained open and relatively unpatrolled after capture in the 1967 war until the 1990s. Tens and eventually hundreds of thousands of Palestinians became migrant workers in Israel. Their migration was not legalized until 1969, but unpermitted workers formed a major proportion of laborers throughout this period. In an attempt to prevent Palestinian residency, workers were required to return home each night, though in practice this requirement was not always followed (Bartram 1998).

==== Spousal unification ====
From 1993 to 2003, between 100,000 and 140,000 Palestinians from West Bank and Gaza became legal residents and have settled in Israel. After 2003, the process was halted as a result of the Citizenship and Entry into Israel Law.

== See also ==
- Prevention of Infiltration Law (1954)
- Palestinian Fedayeen insurgency
  - Israeli reprisal operations
- Citizenship and Entry into Israel Law (2003)

== Sources ==
- David V. Bartram, "Foreign Workers in Israel: History and Theory," International Migration Review, Vol. 32, No. 2. (Summer, 1998), pp. 303–325.
- Benny Morris, Israel's Border Wars 1949–1956 (1993).
