= 1949–1956 Palestinian expulsions =

Continuation of the 1948 Palestinian exodus

The expulsions of Palestinian people from 1949 to 1956 were a continuation of the 1948 expulsion and flight from Israeli-controlled territory that occurred after the signing of the 1949 ceasefire agreements. This period of the exodus was characterised predominantly by forced expulsion during the consolidation of the state of Israel and the growing tension along ceasefire lines that ultimately led to the 1956 Suez Crisis.

Between 1948 and 1950, according to historian Benny Morris, Israel displaced and expelled between 30,000 and 40,000 Palestinians and Bedouin. Many villages along the ceasefire lines and the Lebanon border area were leveled, and many emptied villages were resettled by new Jewish immigrants and demobilized Israeli military forces.

Israel argued this was motivated by security considerations linked with the situation at the borders. During the consolidation period, Israel was more intent on gaining control of the demilitarized zones on the Syrian, Jordanian and Egyptian fronts than on its image abroad.

== Background ==
Immediately after the 1948 Arab–Israeli War, Israel began a process of nation-building; its first general elections were held on 25 January 1949. Chaim Weizmann was installed as Israel's first President, and David Ben-Gurion (head of the Mapai party ) attained the position of Prime minister of Israel that he had previously held in the provisional government. Ben-Gurion emphatically rejected the return of refugees in the Israeli Cabinet decision of June 1948. This position is reiterated in a letter to the UN of 2 August 1949 containing the text of a statement made by Moshe Sharett on 1 August 1948 where the basic attitude of the Israeli government was that a solution must be sought, not through the return of the refugees to Israel, but through the resettlement of the Palestinian Arab refugee population in other states.

The Israeli government was of the view that the armistice agreements gave them three indisputable rights:

1. The ceasefire was binding on regular armies, irregular forces and civilians.
2. The ceasefire line should be treated as an international border, pending full de jure recognition in a final peace agreement.
3. The right to settle Jews on all the land within their territory, with the right to develop the economy without having to take into account the rights of the previous owners.

The Arab nations conversely also saw the General Armistice Agreements as conferring three rights:

1. The agreements were a truce and therefore did not end the state of war.
2. The ceasefire lines were temporary and were not an international border.
3. The Armistice Agreements did not cancel out the refugees' right of return.

=== Security ===
Israeli security was conceptualized on two levels: general security and daily security. General security covered the threat of invasion while daily security aimed to secure Israeli territory from infiltration. This was achieved by three processes: the transfer of Israeli Arabs away from the ceasefire lines to urban areas of concentration such as Jaffa and Haifa; the resettlement of the areas cleared along the ceasefire lines, mainly by Mizrahi Jews in moshavim; and operating a free fire policy.

Once the fighting phase of the 1948 Arab-Israeli war had ceased with a truce, the Israeli bureaucracy was faced with the task of ruling over dozens of severely disrupted Israeli Arab villages and towns, where thousands of displaced Palestinians had taken refuge. Since the Israeli state did not trust its Israeli Arab citizens, seeing them as a potential fifth column, it placed this entire population under a tight military regime supervised by the Central Committee for Arab Affairs. Established in 1954, the committee had representatives from the police and the domestic intelligence agency, Shabak, as well as the prime minister's consultant for Arab affairs and the commander-in-chief of military rule. In concert, the committee presided over three regional sub-committees (south, center and north), which dealt with the daily business of governance.

The Registration of Residents ordinance of 1949 left unregistered Palestinian Arabs without legal status and vulnerable to deportation. The Abandoned Property law of 1950, where the moveable and immovable property belonging to the refugees was effectively appropriated by the state of Israel, applied not only to Palestinian refugees who had left Israeli territory but also to Palestinian Arabs who had remained in Israel but who had left their ordinary place of residence. One quarter of the Arab citizens of Israel are "internal refugees," who until 1948 resided in villages that were destroyed in the war.

==== Infiltration ====
From 1949 to 1956, an estimated 90% of infiltration was motivated by social and economic concerns. It was naturally difficult to prevent refugees who were living on a bare subsistence level from crossing lines beyond which they hoped to find fodder for their hungry sheep, or for scarce fuel. Additionally, occasional nightly clandestine smuggling occurred between Gaza and Hebron. The smuggling was largely motivated by the great discrepancy in prices between the two areas. In 1950, most of these complaints concerned the shooting by Israelis of refugee civilians and livestock, said to have illegally crossed the demarcation lines. In the most serious case of this kind, Egypt complained that on the 7 and 14 October 1950, Israeli military forces shelled and machine-gunned the Arab villages of Abasan al-Kabira and Beit Hanoun in the Egyptian-controlled territory of the Gaza strip, killing seven civilians and the wounding twenty. Israel complained of infiltration incidents leading to the death of four Israeli settlers and the wounding of twenty others.

The pejorative term 'infiltrator' was also applied to refugee non-residents who had not left Israel, as was the case in Nazareth. On 21 November 1949, the Arab member of the Knesset Mr. Amin Jarjura (Mapai) asked the Knesset permission for the 6,000 refugees of Nazareth to return to their surrounding villages; at the same time the IDF were conducting a sweep through the city of Nazareth, rounding up non-residents who the Jerusalem Post then termed infiltrators.

==== Arab countries anti-infiltration policies ====
The Israeli government claimed that as an extension of the Arab-Israeli conflict, Arab countries were aiding and abetting infiltrators by using them as guerillas. Some historians consider this claim inaccurate.

The problem of establishing and guarding the demarcation line separating the Gaza Strip from the Israeli-held Negev area, proved a challenging one, largely due to the presence of more than 200,000 Palestinian Arab refugees in the Gaza area. The terms of the Armistice Agreement restricted Egypt's use and deployment of regular armed forces in the Gaza strip. The Egyptian government circumvented this restriction by forming a Palestinian para-military police force, the Palestinian Border police, in December 1952. The Border police were placed under the command of ‘Abd-al-Man’imi ‘Abd-al-Ra’uf, a former Egyptian air brigade commander, member of the Muslim Brotherhood and member of the Revolutionary Council. 250 Palestinian volunteers started training in March 1953 with further volunteers coming forward for training in May and December 1953. Part of the Border police personnel were attached to the Military Governor's office and placed under ‘Abd-al-‘Azim al-Saharti to guard public installations in the Gaza strip.

To prevent future incidents caused by infiltration on the Egyptian ceasefire line and DMZ, the Mixed Armistice Commission finally decided that a system of mixed border patrols comprising officers and enlisted men from each side would decrease tension and lessen infiltration. Initially, the mixed patrols along the Egyptian demarcation line worked satisfactorily. The Egyptian Authorities maintained a policy of "incarcerating" the inhabitants of the Gaza strip until 1955.

==== Free fire policy ====
The IDF adopted a free fire policy which included patrols, ambushes, laying mines, setting booby traps and carrying out periodic search operations in Israeli Arab villages. The "free fire" policy in the period of 1949 to 1956 has been estimated to account for 2,700 to 5,000 Palestinian Arab deaths. During anti-infiltration operations, Israeli forces committed atrocities including gang rape, murder and the dumping of 120 suspected infiltrators in the Avara desert without water.

Additionally the IDF carried out operations, mainly in Jordanian-held territory and Egyptian-held territory. The early reprisal raids failed to achieve their objectives and managed to increase hatred for Israel amongst Arab countries and refugees. The disruptive and destabilizing nature of the raids put the Western plans for the defence of the Middle East in jeopardy, leading Western powers to apply pressure on Israeli to desist.

== Continued displacement and dispossession ==
From November 1948 through the summer of 1949 and the signing of the General Armistice Agreements, an additional 87 villages were occupied, 36 of which were emptied by force.

According to statistics taken from the official records of the Hashemite Kingdom of Jordan/Israel Mixed Armistice Commission for the period of June 1949 through December 1952, Jordan complained of 37 instances of expulsion of Arabs from Israel. For the period 1 January 1953 through to 15 October 1953, Jordan complained of 7 instances of expulsion of Arabs from Israel involving 41 people.

The Jewish National Fund under Yosef Weitz actively encouraged Palestinian Arab emigration. In the village of Ar'ara 2,500 dunums (625 acres) were purchased. The purchase price was paid in Jordanian currency and the Palestinian Arabs were then transported to the ceasefire line with their luggage and from there transported to Tulkarem.

=== Galilee ===
During Operation Hiram in the upper Galilee, Israeli military commanders received the order: "Do all you can to immediately and quickly purge the conquered territories of all hostile elements in accordance with the orders issued. The residents should be helped to leave the areas that have been conquered." (31 October 1948, Moshe Carmel) The UN's acting Mediator, Ralph Bunche, reported that United Nations Observers recorded extensive looting of villages in Galilee by Israeli forces, which carried away goats, sheep and mules. This looting, United Nations Observers report, appeared to have been systematic as army trucks were used for transportation. The situation, states the report, created a new influx of refugees into Lebanon. Israeli forces, he stated, have occupied the area in Galilee formerly occupied by Kaukji's forces, and have crossed the Lebanese frontier. Bunche goes on to say "that Israeli forces now hold positions inside the south-east corner of Lebanon, involving some fifteen Lebanese villages which are occupied by small Israeli detachments".

An example of the use of "rumours" is given where Glazer comments on the use of psychological warfare against civilians and quotes Nafez Nazzal's description of the Galilee exodus:

The villages of Ghuwayr Abu Shusha were persuaded by neighbouring Jewish Mukhtars to leave to Syria...The villagers heard how ruthless and cruel the Jews were to the people of Deir Yassin and the nearby village of Nasr ed Din. They [the villagers] were not prepared to withstand the Jewish attack and decided to accept their neighbours advice and leave.

The method of planting false atrocity stories to engineer an exodus is borne out by Yigal Allon's Palmach plans to force the exodus of the Palestinian Arabs of Galilee:

The long battle had weaken our forces and before us stood great duties of blocking the routes of invasion. We therefore looked for means which did not force us into employing force, in order to cause the tens of thousands of sulky Arab who remained in the Galilee to flee, for in case of an Arab invasion they were likely to strike us in the rear. I gathered all the Jewish Mukhtars who had contact with Arabs in different villages, and asked to whisper in the ear of some Arabs that great Jewish reinforcements had arrived in Galilee and that it is going to burn all the villages of the Huleh. They should suggest to those Arabs, as a friend, to escape while there is still time.

The villages of al Mansura, Tarbikha, Iqrit and Kafr Bir'im in Galilee were invaded by IDF forces during late October and early November 1948 after Operation Hiram. Because the villages were located in an area within 5 km of to the Israel-Lebanon border, they were to be evacuated of their Palestinian Arab population. For security reasons, the Israeli forces wanted the villages populated primarily by Jews. On 13 November 1948 the inhabitants of Kafr Bir'im were instructed by the IDF to "temporarily" evacuate in expectation of an Arab counter-attack. Emmanuel Friedman, an intelligence officer of the 7th Brigade, explained the evacuation orders to the villagers. The order was issued by Bechor Sheetrit. The villagers of Kafr Bir'im initially sought protection in a nearby cave. Seeing the elderly, women and children living in the cave, the Minister of Police Bechor Sheetrit suggested that the villagers move further south to the town of Jish, where there were 400 abandoned houses, "until the military operations are over". Approximately 700 of the Kafr Bir'em villagers found accommodation within Israel, and the remaining 250 were encouraged to cross into Lebanon. Archbishop Elias Chacour, originally a resident of Iqrit, relates in his autobiography how in the spring of 1949, the IDF rounded up all the men and older boys in the village (including his own father and three eldest brothers), and trucked them to the border with Jordan. There they were let out and ordered to go to Jordan. The soldiers opened fire, aiming just above their heads, meaning to drive them from their homeland for good. However, Chacour's father and brothers managed to return three months later. The operation to achieve a Palestinian Arab free Israel/Lebanon border zone came to an end on 15 16 November, leaving Fassuta (Christians), Jish (Maronites), Rihaniya (Circassians), Mi'ilya (Christians) and Jurdiye (Muslims) within the 5–7 km zone.

The first legal action against the state of Israel was brought in 1951 by 5 men of Iqrit with Muhammad Nimr al-Hawari acting as their lawyer. On 31 July 1951 the Israeli courts recognised the rights of the villagers to their land and their right to return to it. The court said the land was not abandoned and therefore could not be placed under the custodian of enemy property.

In 1953 the (by now former) inhabitants of Kafr Bir'im pleaded to the Supreme Court of Israel to allow them to return to their village. Early in September 1953 the Supreme Court decided that the authorities had to answer to why the inhabitants were not allowed to return home. The result was devastating: on 16 September 1953 the Israeli air force and army in a joint operation bombed the village until it was completely destroyed. At the same time it was announced that 1,170 hectares of land belonging to the village had been expropriated by the state.

On 16 January 1949, an attempt to move the remaining Palestinian Arab inhabitants of Tarshiha to the neighbouring towns of Mi'ilya and Majd al Kurum was prevented by UN and Christian clerical intercession. Pressure from kibbutz and the military in the Galilee panhandle mounted to remove the Palestinian inhabitants of the area. On 5/6 June the inhabitants of Khisas and Qeitiya were forced into trucks and dumped near 'Akbara just south of Safad.

=== Wadi Ara ===
In March 1949, as Iraqi forces withdrew from Palestine and handed over their positions to the smaller Jordanian legion, three Israeli brigades manoeuvred into threatening positions in Operation Shin-Tav-Shin in a form of coercive diplomacy. The operation allowed Israel to renegotiate the ceasefire line in the Wadi Ara area of the Northern West Bank in a secret agreement reached on 23 March 1949 and incorporated into the General Armistice Agreement. The Green Line was then redrawn in blue ink on the southern map to give the impression that a movement in the Green line had been made. However, this replacement involved a considerable change of the lines, a change which could not be carried out without inflicting serious hardships upon the population and the affected areas. It was inevitable that thousands of people, in the course of this redrawing of demarcation lines, were cut off from the fields that were their livelihood, cut off from their only resources of water and from the meager pastures on which they used to graze their cattle. An estimated 15 villages were ceded to Israel and a further 15,000 Palestinian Arabs became refugees.

During the Lausanne Peace Conference the US consul, William Burdett, reported on a meeting of the Jordan/Israel Armistice Commission which dealt with a case where 1,000 (UN estimates 1,500) Palestinian Arab inhabitants of Baqa al-Gharbiyye had been expelled and forced across the ceasefire line. The Mixed Armistice Commission decided, by majority vote, that Israel had violated the General Armistice Agreement by driving the civilians across the demarcation line into the territory of the Hashemite Jordan Kingdom.

In January/February 1949 approximately 700 people from Kfar Yassif were expelled across the Jordanian/Israeli ceasefire line as they had moved into Kfar Yassif from the surrounding villages during the period of fighting in 1948.

=== Majdal ===
On 17 August 1950 the remaining Palestinian Arab population of Majdal were served with an expulsion order (The Palestinians had been held in a confined area since 1948) and the first group of them were taken on trucks to the Gaza Strip. Majdal was then renamed Ashkelon by the Israelis in an ongoing process of de-Arabisation of the topography as described by Meron Benvenisti. Egypt accepted the expelled civilian Palestinian Arabs from Majdal on humanitarian grounds as they would otherwise have been exposed to "torture and death". That however did not mean their voluntary movement. Furthermore, testimony of the expelled Arabs and reports of the Mixed Armistice Commission clearly showed that the refugees had been forcibly expelled.

Ilan Pappé reports that the last gun-point expulsion occurred in 1953 where the residents of Umm al-Faraj were driven out and the village destroyed by the IDF. "

=== Abu Ghosh ===
Abu Ghosh expulsion.

=== Wadi Fukin ===
The expulsion at Wadi Fukin led to a change in the Green line where an exchange of fertile land in the Bethlehem area to Israeli control and the village of Wadi Fukin being given to Jordanian control. On 15 July when the Israeli Army expelled the population of Wadi Fukin after the village had been transferred to the Israeli-occupied area under the terms of the Armistice Agreement concluded between Israel and the Jordan Kingdom. The Mixed Armistice Commission decided on 31 August, by a majority vote, that Israel had violated the Armistice Agreement by expelling villagers of Wadi Fukin across the demarcation line and decided that the villagers should be allowed to return to their homes. However, when the villagers returned to Wadi Fukin under the supervision of the United Nations observers on 6 September, they found most of their houses destroyed and were again compelled by the Israeli Army to return to Jordanian controlled territory. The United Nations Chairman of the Mixed Commission, Colonel Garrison B. Coverdale (US), pressed for a solution of this issue to be found in the Mixed Armistice Commission, in an amicable and UN spirit. After some hesitation, an adjustment in the Green Line was accepted and finally an agreement was reached whereby the Armistice line was changed to give back Wadi Fukin to the Jordanian authority who, in turn, agreed to transfer some uninhabited, but fertile territory south of Bethlehem to the Israeli authority.

=== Northern District ===
Israeli forces attacked Jalbun village, with small arms, on the 5 December 1949, they then expelled the inhabitants from their village causing fatal casualties amongst the villagers. The Jordanian government strongly protested against unwarranted Israeli action and call on UN secretary General to notify the security council to take prompt and strict measures to return expelled Palestinians to their village, to hand back their looted belongings, and to compensate the villagers for all losses and damages.

In the lake Huleh area, during 1951, Israel initiated a project to drain the marsh land to bring 15,000 acres (61 km^{2}) into cultivation. The project caused a conflict of interests between the Palestinian Arab villages in the area, consequently 800 inhabitants of the villages were forcibly evacuated from the DMZ.

In 1954 Israel "evacuated" the Palestinian villages of Baqqara and Ghannama in the central sector of the Israel/Syria demilitarized zone the Chief of Staff of the UNTSO made a report in January 1955 to the United Nations where it was decided that:

- "(a) Decides that Arab civilians who have been removed from the demilitarized zone by the Government of Israel should be permitted to return forthwith to their homes and that the Mixed Armistice Commission should supervise their return and rehabilitation in a manner to be determined by the Commission; and
- "(b) Holds that no action involving the transfer of persons across international frontiers, armistice lines or within the demilitarized zone should be under-taken without prior decision of the Chairman of the Mixed Armistice Commission..."

30 October 1956 When Israel attacked Egypt across the Sinai peninsula in co-ordination with an Anglo-French attack on Suez. The remainder of the Palestinians living in the DMZs were driven into Syria. The villages of Baqqara and Ghannama now lie as rubble and are empty.

=== Negev ===
Between 1949 and 1959, Bedouin communities were repeatedly expelled across Israel's armistice lines into Egypt, Jordan, and the West Bank. Particularly affected were the Azazima, a tribal confederation whose lands lay in the Negev Mountains south of the Beersheba–Arad valley; an estimated 7,000 to 8,000 members of the Azazima were displaced even after the end of the war.

==== Beersheba ====
According to the Jordanian minister of foreign affairs at the time, on 7 November 1949, Israeli forces expelled two thousand men, women, children from Beersheba area into the Jordanian controlled sector. Before the Palestinian Arabs were expelled they were severely maltreated, their homes destroyed, their cattle, sheep, belongings looted.

==== Auja al-Hafir ====
20 August 1950 Israeli authorities expelled into Egyptian territory all the Bedouin living in the demilitarized zone of Auja al-Hafir in Palestine. United Nations observers found that thirteen Arabs, including women and children, had died during the exodus and bodies of several more had been found crushed by armoured vehicles. By 3 September, the number of expelled Arabs had reached 4,071. Most of them had lived in the Beersheba area of Palestine during the period of the British Mandate and was driven from their homes for the first time when the Israeli forces had occupied Beersheba. The Bedouin had gone to settle in Auja al-Hafir and had been living there for more than two years. The Bedouin made representation to return to el-Auja under United Nations protection.

==== es-Sani are returned to Israel ====
One of the best-documented cases concerns the es-Sani tribe. In their case, displacement had already begun in late 1948. Following the fall of Beersheba, members of the tribe were forcibly removed from their lands in the al-Shariʿa (Zummarā) region—located in the area of present-day Netivot west of Beersheba—and transferred "for security reasons" to their other tribal lands at al-Laqiya, northeast of Beersheba.

In al-Laqiya, the es-Sani remained until the early 1950s. In 1952, the Israeli military government informed Sheikh al-Hajj Ibrahim that the tribe was to be relocated to Tel Arad, an undeveloped and arid area. The Sheikh objected to the relocation, as he was familiar with the region and did not believe that his tribe could survive there. He insisted on receiving a written deportation order. According to historian Gadi Algazi, this demand could not be met because the planned relocation was illegal under Israeli law. Israel nevertheless sought to enforce the relocation by cultivating the land with tractors, dismantling es-Sani tents, and transporting part of the tribe to Tel Arad.

The Sheikh filed complaints with Israeli courts, which subsequently prohibited the Israeli authorities from cultivating the land and ruled that the es-Sani were entitled to remain there. As Israeli pressure continued to intensify, the Sheikh announced that he would rather migrate to Jordan than accept relocation to Tel Arad. A subsequent inspection by Commander Elmo H. Hutchison of the Hashemite Kingdom of Jordan/Israel Mixed Armistice Commission counted over 100 families—nearly 1,000 people—encamped inside Jordan.

Jordan refused to absorb the group permanently, fearing that doing so would create a precedent encouraging further expulsions. The majority of the es-Sani therefore returned to Israel. Israeli authorities subsequently cited this double migration as evidence that the es-Sani were "nomads," thereby denying them land rights, and ultimately settled them at Tel Arad in contravention of the earlier court ruling.

== See also ==
- 1948 Palestinian expulsion and flight
- 1967 Palestinian exodus
- Palestinian exodus from Kuwait (Gulf War)
- Palestinian refugees
- Arab citizens of Israel
- 1952 Beit Jala Raid
- Qibya massacre
- Jewish exodus from Arab and Muslim countries
- Transfer Committee

== Bibliography ==
- Karmi, Ghada; Cotran, Eugene, eds. (28 January 1999). The Palestinian Exodus: 1948-1998. Ithaca Press. ISBN 0-86372-244-X.
- Morris, Benny (1993). Israel's Border Wars, 1949-1956; Arab Infiltration, Israeli Retaliation and the Countdown to the Suez War. Oxford Clarendon Press. ISBN 0-19-829262-7.
- Morris, Benny (2004). Birth of the Palestinian Refugee Problem Revisited (2nd ed.). Cambridge University Press. ISBN 0-521-00967-7.
- Pappé, Ilan (2006). The Ethnic cleansing of Palestine. Oneworld Publications. ISBN 978-1-85168-467-0.
- Segev, Tom (1998). 1949; The first Israelis. Henry Holt and Company. ISBN 0-8050-5896-6.
- Shlaim, Avi (2000). The Iron Wall; Israel and the Arab World. Penguin Books. ISBN 0-14-028870-8.
- Shlaim, Avi (2004). The Politics of Partition; King Abdullah, The Zionists, and Palestine 1921-1951 (Revised ed.). Oxford University Press. ISBN 0-19-829459-X.
