= HaGoshrim =

HaGoshrim: הגושרים (Hebrew)
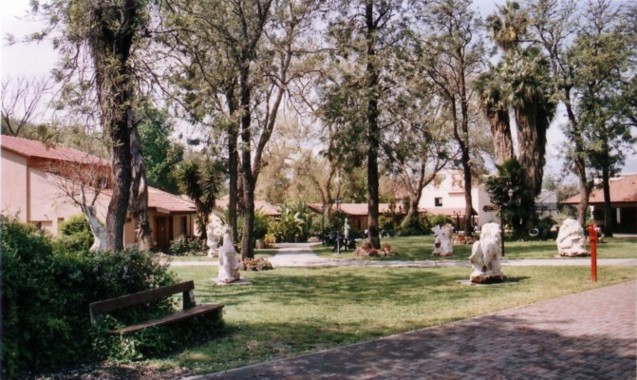

- Location within Northeast Israel Location within Israel
- Coordinates: 33°13′15″N 35°37′25″E
- Country: Israel
- District: Northern
- Subdistrict: Safed
- Council: Upper Galilee
- Affiliation: Kibbutz Movement
- Founded: 1948
- Founder: Turkish Jews
- Population (2024): 1,232
- Website: www.hagoshrim.co.il

HaGoshrim (Hebrew: הַגּוֹשְׁרִים, lit. 'The Bridge Builders') is a kibbutz in the Galilee Panhandle in northern Israel, 5 km (3 miles) east of Kiryat Shmona. The kibbutz is adjacent to the Hurshat Tal National Park and bisected by tributaries of the Jordan River, the Snir (Hatsbani), Koren, itself a tributary of the Dan and Tal. In 2024 it had a population of 1,232.

== History ==
Kibbutz HaGoshrim was founded in 1948 mostly by Jewish immigrants from Turkey. The kibbutz was established near the former Palestinian village of al-Khisas, which was depopulated during the 1948 Arab-Israeli War. The kibbutz opened a hotel in the manor house of Emir Faour, chief of the al-Fadel tribe, for whom the villagers worked as tenant farmers.

== Economy ==
The chief economic branches are agriculture and tourism. The kibbutz also owns Mepro, which manufactures carpenters' levels and military optics, and the Epilady company, established in 1986. Epilady is a hand-held device developed by two Israeli engineers that revolutionized hair removal.

== Archaeology ==
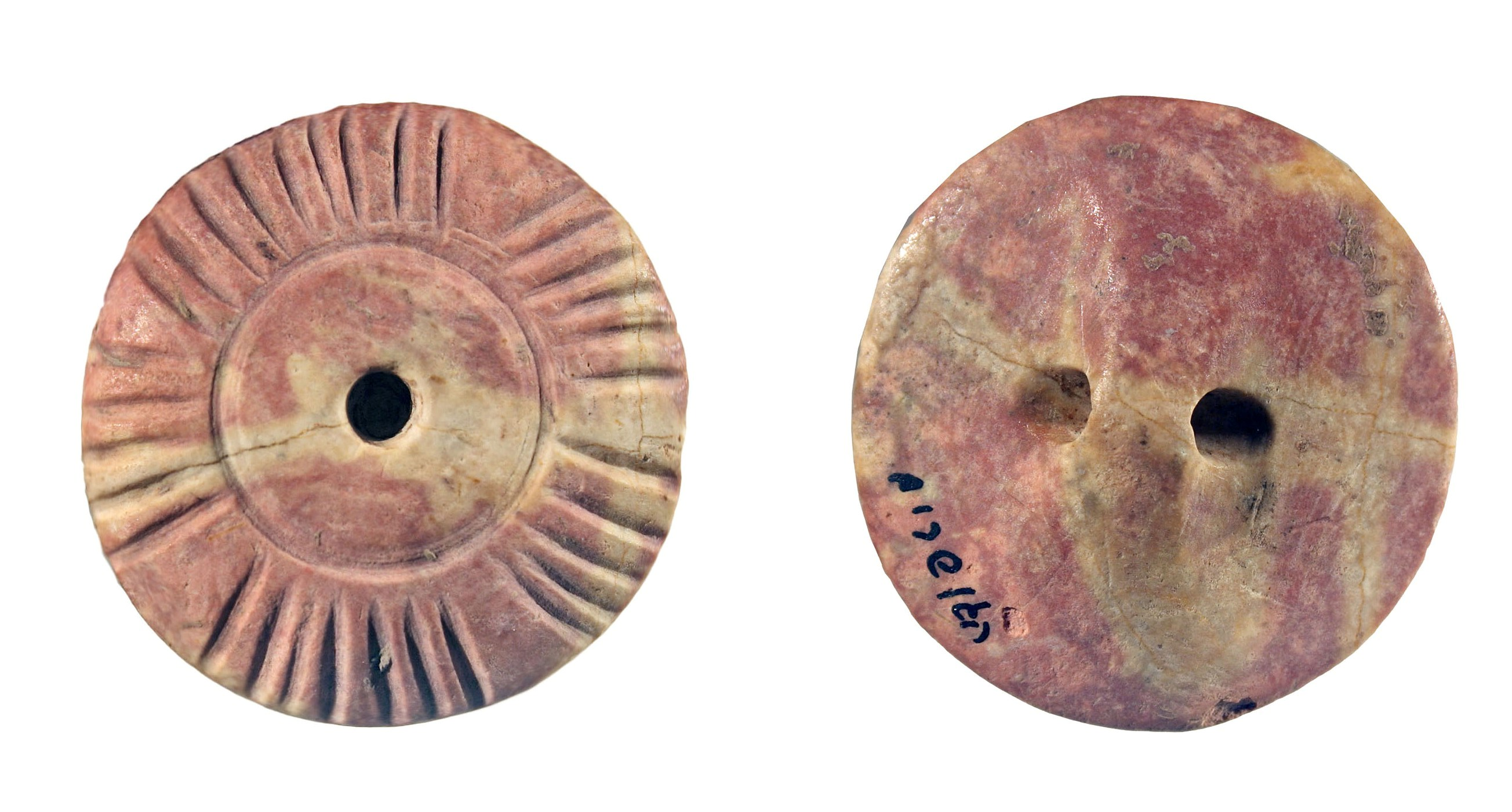
Early Chalcolithic seal from Hagoshrim

Excavations at the Early Chalcolithic site of Hagoshrim in 2003 yielded a large assemblage of skeletal fragments, mainly of cattle and pigs, providing evidence of the domestication of these taxa in the southern Levant.
