= Al-Khisas =

al-Khisas الخصاص 'Arab al-Khisas
- Village
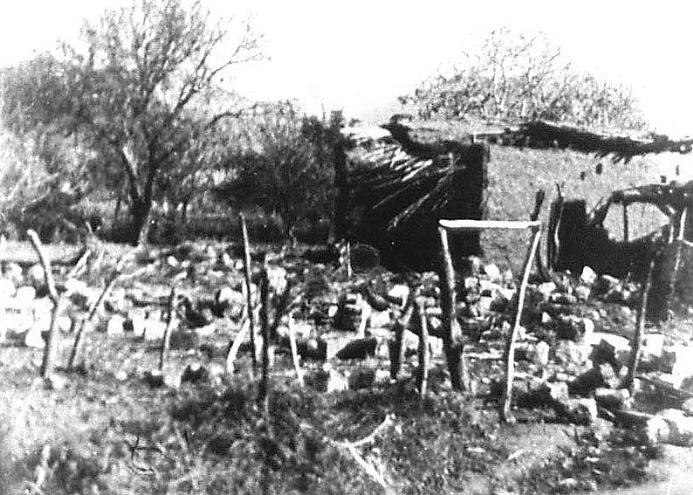
- Ruins of a destroyed house in Al-Khisas after the 1947 Al-Khisas raid

- Location within Mandatory Palestine
- Coordinates: 33°13′31″N 35°37′10″E
- Palestine grid: 208/292
- Geopolitical entity: Mandatory Palestine
- Subdistrict: Safad
- Date of depopulation: 25 May 1948/June 1949

Area
  - Total: 4,795 dunams (4.795 km^{2}; 1.851 sq mi)

Population (1945)
  - Total: 530 (470 Arabs and 60 Jews)
- Cause(s) of depopulation: Violence and direct expulsions
- Current Localities: HaGoshrim (ha-Gosherim)

Al-Khisas (Arabic: الخصاص), also known as Khisas or Khissas, was a Palestinian Arab village in the Safad Subdistrict in Mandatory Palestine. It was located 31 kilometers (19 mi) northeast of Safed on a natural terrace about 100 meters (330 ft) wide that formed when Lake al-Hula receded. To the west of the village was a valley known as Wadi al-Hasibani through which ran the Hasbani River.

During the 1948 Palestine war, and as part of the Nakba, the village was attacked by the Palmach in a punitive raid and 10-15 of its residents were massacred. The village was subsequently depopulated and destroyed by Israeli forces. Today the Israeli kibbutz of HaGoshrim exists on the village's former lands.

== History ==
The Arab geographer Yaqut al-Hamawi described al-Khisas as falling within the administrative jurisdiction of Banias in Syria.

=== Ottoman era ===
Evidence of the long history of habitation in the village includes the nearby shrine of a local sage known as al-Shaykh 'Ali and the presence of rock-hewn tombs. Under the Ottoman Empire, al-Khisas was administered as part of a sanjak in the vilayet of Damascus, and was later redesignated a part the vilayet of Sidon (renamed the vilayet of Beirut).

=== British Mandate ===
In 1917, al-Khisas lay north of the Sykes Picot line, a straight line between the midpoint of the Sea of Galilee and Nahariya in the area to be incorporated under a French sphere of influence. The Syria-Lebanon-Palestine boundary was a product of the post-World War I Anglo-French partition of Ottoman Syria. British forces had advanced to a position at Tel Hazor against Turkish troops in 1918 and wished to incorporate all the sources of the river Jordan within the boundaries of British controlled Palestine. Due to the French inability to establish administrative control, the frontier between Syria and Palestine became 'fluid'. The international boundary between Palestine and Syria was finally set by joint agreement between Great Britain and France in 1923 in conjunction with the Treaty of Lausanne, after Britain had been given a League of Nations Mandate for Palestine in 1922; thus, al-Khisas came under British jurisdiction.

In the 1931 census of Palestine the population of Khisas was 386, all Muslims, in a total of 73 houses.

Types of land use in dunams in the village in 1945:

Land Usage	Arab	Jewish
Irrigated and plantation	1,438	2,728
Cereal	0	0
Cultivable	1,438	2,728
Urban	30	10
Non-cultivable	12	0

The land ownership of the village in dunams:

Owner	Dunams
Arab	1,480
Jewish	2,738
Public	577
Total	4,795

=== 1948 Palestine war and aftermath ===
Al-Khisas had been selected, along with Al-Na'ima and Jahula, by the Palmach as a target for a Haganah operation which was then cancelled before it was undertaken. Leaflets was distributed in villages on Palestine's border that warned the population not to engage in combat:

"If the war will be taken to your place, it will cause massive expulsion of the villagers, with their wives and their children. Those of you who do not wish to come to such a fate, I will tell them: in this war there will be merciless killing, no compassion. If you are not participating in this war, you will not have to leave your houses and villages."

==== Al-Khisas massacre ====
On the night of 18–19 December 1947, the Palmach conducted a massacre in al-Khisas with orders calling for "hitting adult [or the adult] males" and "killing adult [or the adult] males in the palace of the Emir Faur", which was thought to hide a man responsible for shooting a resident of kibbutz Ma'ayan Baruch in revenge for the shooting of a Palestinian a few days earlier. They blew up Faur's house and a neighbouring house, killing many occupants including women and children. The number of villagers killed is estimated at 10-15, including 5 children. (Note: Pappé 2006, "Fifteen villagers, including five children, were killed in the attack.") (Note: Benny Morris, 1948 and After (1990), "ten Arab civilians, including five children") Following the attack a large number of al-Khisas' residents fled their homes, becoming a part of the 1948 Palestinian expulsion and flight. (Note: Morris 2004, "Following the raid, a large part of Khisas’s population left their homes")

Local Jewish leaders and Arab affairs experts had tried to prevent the attack, but had been overridden by Yigal Allon. Afterwards the Political Department of the Jewish Agency criticized the attack and Yosef Sapir of the Defence Committee called for the punishment of those responsible, but no action was taken. David Ben-Gurion issued a denial that the raid had been authorised and issued a public apology, but it was later included by him in a list of successful operations. The Yishuv held a meeting on 1–2 January to discuss the policy of reprisal operations, the outcome of which was a formulation of guidelines by the Jewish High Command for the conduct and execution of retaliatory raids.

==== Depopulation and destruction ====
The first wave of villagers left al-Khisas after the 18 December 1947 attack, forming a part of the 1948 Palestinian expulsion and flight. Although an estimated 50-55 villagers remained in their homes and maintained good relations with neighboring Jewish settlements, they were eventually evicted on the night of 5–6 June 1949 as part of the 1949–1956 Palestinian expulsions. The villagers were forced into trucks and transported to the village of 'Akbara, south of Safad. Those expelled remained at 'Akbara for 18 years until agreeing to resettlement in Wadi Hamam.

==== Resettlement ====
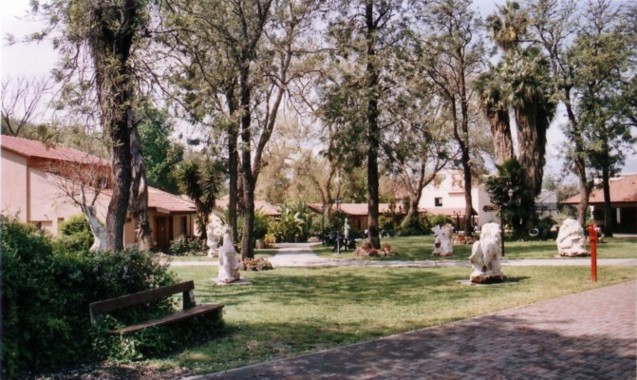
Former manor house of Emir Faour of Al-Khisas, now a hotel in kibbutz HaGoshrim.

On September 26, 1948, kibbutz HaGoshrim was established a few hundred meters south of the village, on the village's lands. The kibbutz opened a hotel in the manor house of Emir Faour.

== See also ==
- Depopulated Palestinian locations in Israel
- List of villages depopulated during the Arab-Israeli conflict
- Killings and massacres during the 1948 Palestine War

== Bibliography ==
- Benvenisti, M. (2000). Sacred Landscape: The Buried History of the Holy Land Since 1948. Maxine Kaufman-Lacusta (translator). University of California Press. ISBN 0-520-92882-2.
- Department of Statistics (1945). Village Statistics, April, 1945. Government of Palestine.
- Finkelstein, N. (2003). Image and reality of the Israeli-Palestine conflict (2 ed.). Verso Press. ISBN 978-1-85984-442-7. (pp. 56, 79 83- 84)
- Fromkin, D. (2010). A Peace to End All Peace: The Fall of the Ottoman Empire and the Creation of the Modern Middle East. New York: Owl. ISBN 978-1-4299-8852-0.
- Khalidi, W. (1992). All That Remains:The Palestinian Villages Occupied and Depopulated by Israel in 1948. Washington D.C.: Institute for Palestine Studies. ISBN 0-88728-224-5.
- Khatib, Hisham (2003). Palestine and Egypt Under the Ottomans: Paintings, Books, Photographs, Maps and Manuscripts. I.B.Tauris. ISBN 1-86064-888-6.
- MacMillan, M. (2011). Peacemakers: The Paris Conference of 1919 and Its Attempt to End War. Hachette UK. ISBN 978-1-8485-4668-4.
- Mills, E., ed. (1932). Census of Palestine 1931. Population of Villages, Towns and Administrative Areas. Jerusalem: Government of Palestine.
- Morris, B. (2004). The Birth of the Palestinian Refugee Problem Revisited. Cambridge University Press. ISBN 978-0-521-00967-6.
- Pappé, I. (2007). The ethnic cleansing of Palestine. (reprint). Oneworld Publications Limited. ISBN 978-1-78074-056-0.
- Shapira, A. (1999). Land and Power; The Zionist Resort to Force, 1881-1948. Stanford University press. ISBN 0-8047-3776-2.
