= Prevention of Infiltration Law =

1954 Israeli law

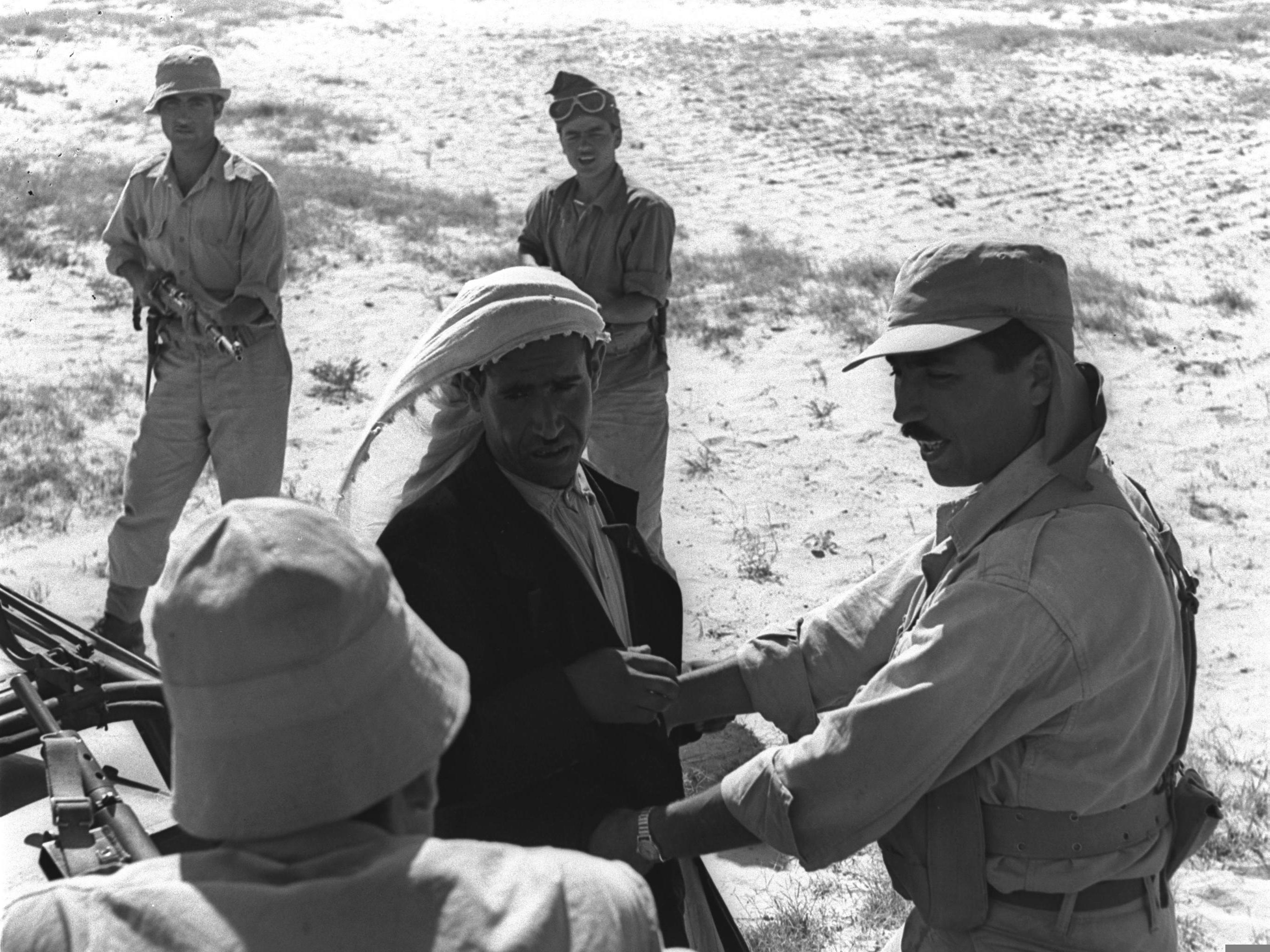
An Arab man from the Egyptian-occupied Gaza Strip being detained by Israeli soldiers, 10 May 1954

The Prevention of Infiltration Law (Hebrew: חוק למניעת הסתננות (עבירות ושיפוט)) is a 1954 Israeli law that deals with the offense of unauthorized entry by armed and unarmed foreigners into Israel. It authorizes the Minister of Defense to order the immediate deportation of any detained infiltrator before or after their conviction.

One of the primary objectives of the law was to prevent the entry of Palestinian fedayeen into Israel's territory, as defined by the 1949 Armistice Agreements, and allows for their expulsion.

After the 1948 Arab–Israeli War and the 1948 Palestinian expulsion and flight, many Palestinian Arabs who either fled or were expelled from their homes, whether they had altogether ventured beyond what became Israel (largely into the neighbouring Arab countries: Lebanon, Syria, Jordan, and Egypt) or were internally displaced, tried for many years since then to return to the places they had left.

The law also originally designated Lebanon, Egypt, Syria, Saudi Arabia, Jordan, Iraq, and Yemen as "enemy states" of Israel. Egypt and Jordan were removed from the list after the signing of peace accords with these countries in 1979 and 1994, while Iran was added to the list after the Islamic Revolution in 1979. Israeli citizens may not visit countries designated as enemy states without a permit issued by the Israeli Interior Ministry. In January 2020, Israel's Minister of the Interior said Israeli citizens, both Muslims and Jews, can travel to Saudi Arabia for religious and business purposes. (These countries also generally ban entry of Israelis, though they have permitted entry in exceptional circumstances.)

The law was amended in 2013, in the context of Illegal immigration into Israel from Africa, setting limitations on the time an infiltrator could be detained, increasing the number of anti-infiltration enforcement officers, and increase compensation to infiltrators who willingly returned to their own countries.

== Context ==
Palestinian infiltration into Israel began with Palestinian refugees of the 1948 Arab–Israeli War, living in camps in Jordan, Lebanon, Egypt, and Syria. Most of the infiltration at this time was economic in nature, with Palestinians crossing the border seeking food or the recovery of property lost in the 1948 war. Between 1948 and 1955, Palestinian infiltration into Israel was firmly opposed by Arab governments.

The problem of establishing and guarding the demarcation line separating the Gaza Strip from the Israeli-held Negev area, proved a vexing one: largely due to the presence of more than 200,000 Palestinian Arab refugees in the Gaza Strip. The terms of the Armistice Agreement restricted Egypt's use and deployment of regular armed forces in the Gaza Strip. In keeping with this restriction the Egyptian Government formed a Palestinian para-military police force, the Palestinian Border police, in December 1952. The Border police was under the command of 'Abd-al-Man'imi 'Abd-al-Ra'uf, a former Egyptian air brigade commander, member of the Muslim Brotherhood and member of the Revolutionary Council. 250 Palestinian volunteers started training in March 1953 with further volunteers coming forward for training in May and December 1953. Part of the Border police personnel were attached to the Military Governor's office and placed under 'Abd-al-'Azim al-Saharti to guard public installations in the Gaza Strip. It was only after Israel's raid on an Egyptian military outpost in Gaza in February 1955, in which 37 Egyptian soldiers were killed, that an Arab government—in this case the Egyptian—began to actively sponsor fedayeen raids into Israel. According to the Jewish Agency for Israel between 1951 and 1956, 400 Israelis were killed and 900 wounded in fedayeen attacks.

From time to time, too, the Israeli authorities arrested groups of Arabs who had stayed in the country without being granted Israeli nationality and pushed them over the frontier. These Arabs would often return and, through their relatives, obtain decisions from the Israeli courts allowing them to stay in Israel.

During the 1949–1956 period the motivation of infiltration was social or economic concerns.

For some time these practices continued to embarrass the Israeli authorities until finally they passed a law forbidding Palestinians to enter Israel, those who did so being regarded as "infiltrators.". Most of the people in question were refugees attempting to return to their homes inside Israel. Between 30,000 and 90,000 Palestinian refugees returned to Israel as a result. They wanted to return to what were their homes prior to the Arab–Israeli War, looking for their lost loved ones, harvesting crops from fields that were confiscated, and to reclaim property other than land. There were also Bedouin to whom the concept of newly established borders were foreign.

Arabs declare the infiltration into Israel's territory to have been a direct consequence to the displacement and dispossession of the Palestinian refugees during the 1948 Arab–Israeli War. To Israel, the infiltration was a large problem. Israel's answer to this was to establish new settlements along the border and raze the abandoned Arab villages. A "free fire" policy towards infiltrators was adopted—a policy of shooting those crossing the international armistice line illegally. Eventually, the Israeli leadership came to the conclusion that only retaliatory strikes would be able to create the necessary deterrence, that would convince the Arab countries to prevent infiltration. Although the strikes were sometimes confined to military targets (particularly, at the later stages of the infiltration), numerous civilians were killed, prompting the question whether the strikes were a form of collective punishment.

== Prevention of Infiltration Law ==
The Prevention of Infiltration (Offences and Jurisdiction) Law, 5714-1954 defined as an "infiltrator" anyone who (Article 1(a)):

...has entered Israel knowingly and unlawfully and who at any time between the 16th Kislev, 5708 (29 November 1947, i.e. the date of UNGA Resolution 181) and his entry was -

(1) a national or citizen of the Lebanon, Egypt, Syria, Saudi-Arabia, Trans-Jordan, Iraq or the Yemen; or
(2) a resident or visitor in one of those countries or in any part of Palestine outside Israel; or
(3) a Palestinian citizen or a Palestinian resident without nationality or citizenship or whose nationality or citizenship was doubtful and who, during the said period, left his ordinary place of residence in an area which has become a part of Israel for a place outside Israel.

According to COHRE and BADIL (p. 38), under the Prevention of Infiltration (Offences and Jurisdiction) Law, 5714-1954, the definition of 'infiltrators' corresponded closely with that of 'absentees'. The law established strict penalties for such 'infiltration'. Under this law, 'internal refugees' (Palestinians who were declared absent from their own villages but inside Palestine at the time Israel was created) were also barred from returning to their villages. When caught, these were then expelled from Israel. Over the ensuing years, several thousand internally displaced Palestinians were expelled in this manner, paving the way for Jewish immigration and colonisation of their lands.

According to Kirsbaum over the years, the Israeli Government has continued to cancel and modify some of the Defense (Emergency) Regulations of 1945, but mostly it has added more as it has continued to extend its declared state of emergency. For example, even though the Prevention of Infiltration Law of 1954 is not labelled as an official "Emergency Regulation", it extends the applicability of the Defence (Emergency) Regulation 112 of 1945 giving the Minister of Defence extraordinary powers of deportation for accused infiltrators even before they are convicted (Articles 30 and 32), and makes itself subject to cancellation when the Knesset ends the State of Emergency upon which all of the Emergency Regulations are dependent.

According to a Tel-Aviv University document the Law does not consider the motives of the person for crossing the border and entering Israel. It also enables the establishment of Tribunals for the Prevention of Infiltration, in which judges will preside who are military officers (but who do not necessarily possess legal knowledge) and enables the tribunal to deviate from the rules of evidence. The penalties for infiltration are severe—and may reach imprisonment for five years. The author states that in practice, no uniform practice is employed in relation to persons who cross the border and apply for asylum. Some have been held for periods of two or three years in prison, others have been released from prison on various conditions, while others have not been allowed to enter Israel at all and were returned to the place from which they came (in possible breach of the principle of non-refoulement).

A new government bill, updating the Infiltration Prevention Law, was passed in a vote after the first reading in the last Israeli Knesset term in May 2008, and is being debated in the Committee of Interior in preparation for the second vote and, if this passes, the final vote in the plenum. The bill would allow officers of the Israel Defense Forces to deport asylum seekers, many from Darfur, South Sudan, and Eritrea, back to Egypt. This could be done without providing for a Refugee Status Determination process, as required under in the 1951 Geneva Convention for the protection of Refugees. In the discussions in the Knesset committee, a UNHCR representative emphasized that the international community may criticize Israel if the law did not follow international law. This bill was dropped in July 2010.

A new amendment was brought into the Knesset, which was passed in first reading on 28 March 2011. The law was passed on 9 January 2012 and became law on 3 June 2012.

== See also ==
- Law of Return
- 1948 Palestinian expulsion and flight
- Qibya massacre
- Law of Israel
- Basic Laws of Israel
- Israeli military order 1650
- Palestinian immigration (Israel)
