= Israel's Border Wars, 1949–1956 =

Book by Benny Morris

- Author: Benny Morris
- Publication date: 1993
- ISBN: 978-0198292623

Israel's Border Wars 1949–1956 is a 1993 book written by Benny Morris about the Arab infiltration from Egypt, Jordan, Lebanon and Syria into Israel after the 1948 Arab–Israeli War and before the 1956 Suez Crisis.

Morris contends that the "Arab infiltration" into Israel and the Israeli retaliatory response, including the 1952 raid on Beit Jala, that left four civilians dead, and the Qibya Massacre, that left at least 65 civilians dead, set patterns of behavior that were to characterize the Arab–Israeli conflict for decades to come.

== See also ==
- 1952 Beit Jala raid
- Qibya massacre
- Unit 101
- Reprisal operations
- 1949–1956 Palestinian expulsions
