= Yiftah =

Kibbutz in northern Israel

Yiftah: יפתח (Hebrew)
- Kibbutz
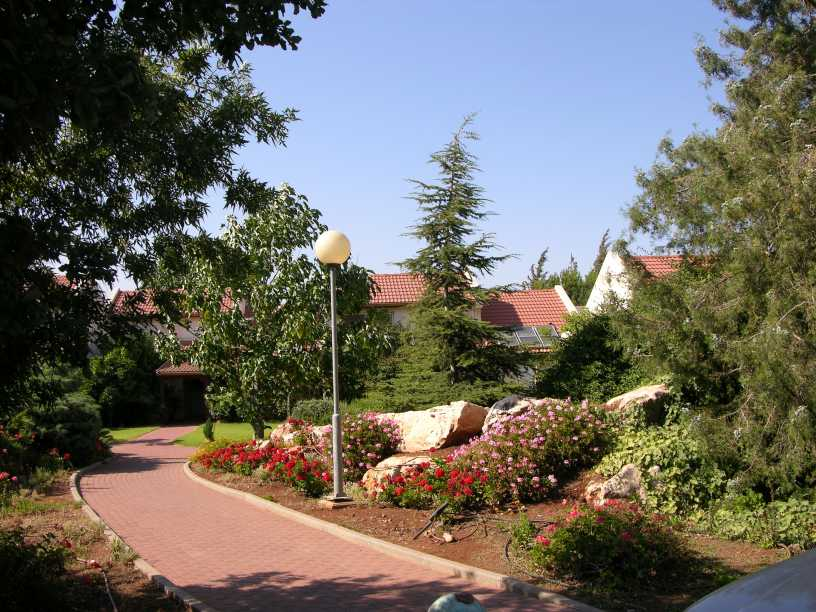
- Etymology: He will open
- Location within Northeast Israel Location within Israel
- Coordinates: 33°7′40″N 35°33′6″E
- Country: Israel
- District: Northern
- Subdistrict: Safed
- Council: Upper Galilee
- Affiliation: Kibbutz Movement
- Founded: 18 August 1948; 78 years ago
- Founder: Demobilised Palmach soldiers
- Population (2024): 636
- Website: yiftah.kibbutz.org.il

Yiftah (Hebrew: יפתח, lit. 'He will open') is a kibbutz in northern Israel. Located on the Naftali Mountains of the Upper Galilee, near the Lebanese border, it falls under the jurisdiction of Upper Galilee Regional Council. In 2024 it had a population of 636.

== History ==
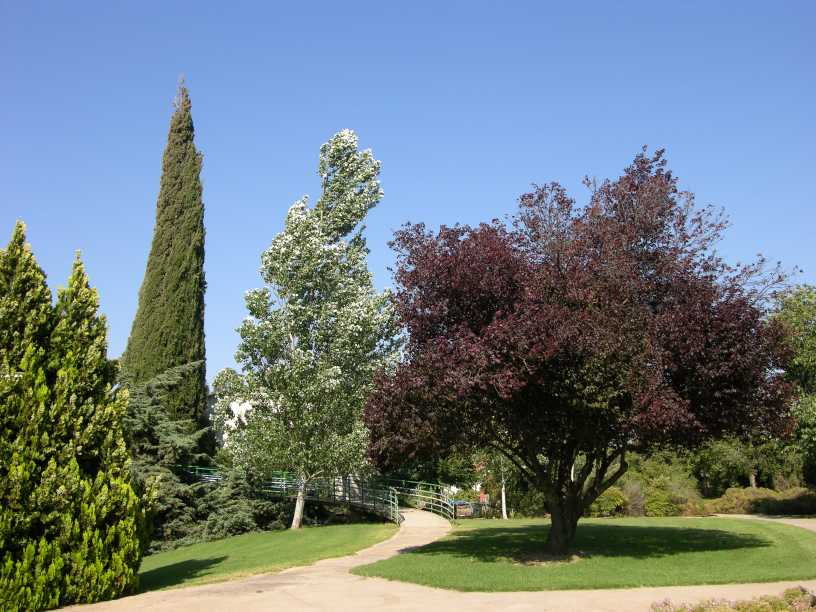
Garden in Yiftah

Yiftah was founded on 18 August 1948 by demobilised Palmach soldiers who were members of the Yiftach Brigade, after which the kibbutz is named. Yiftah is located near the depopulated Palestinian village of Jahula, but on the land belonging to the Palestinian village of Qadas. Metzudat Koach is located nearby.

During the Gaza war, northern Israeli border communities, including Yiftah, faced targeted attacks by Hezbollah and Palestinian factions based in Southern Lebanon, and were evacuated. On 5 November 2023, a driver operating an Israeli water tank for the Israel Defence Forces (IDF) was killed by an anti-tank missile launched by Hezbollah operatives near the kibbutz. On 19 December, Hezbollah fired artillery shells at Yiftah.

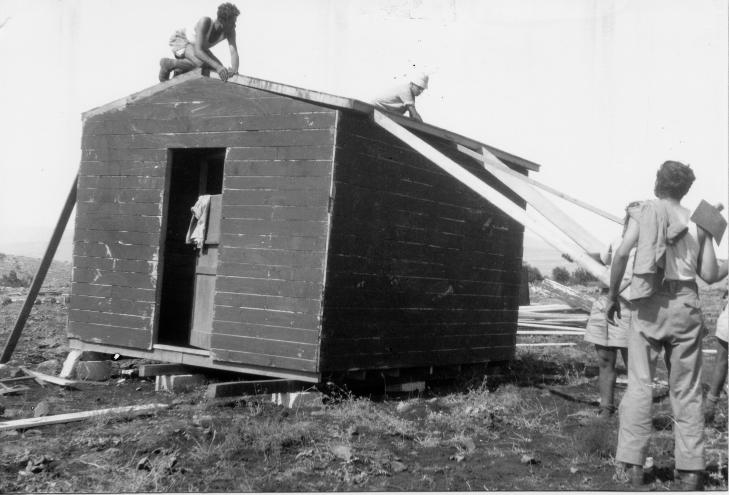
Yiftah under construction, 1948

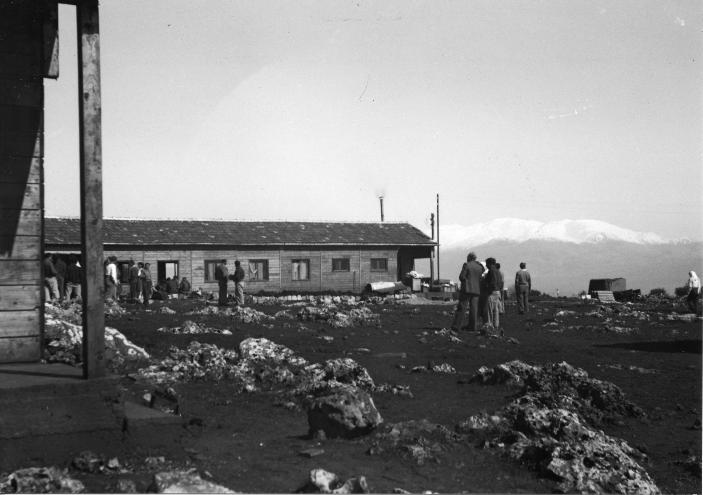
Opening of dining hall with Mount Hermon in distance, 1948

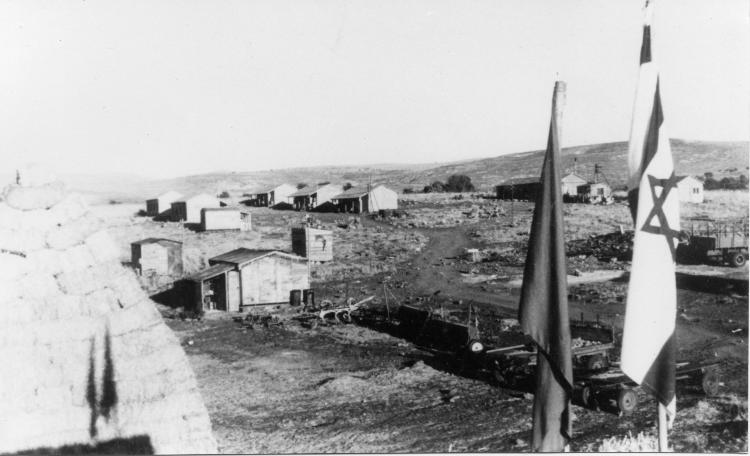
Houses in Yiftah, 1949

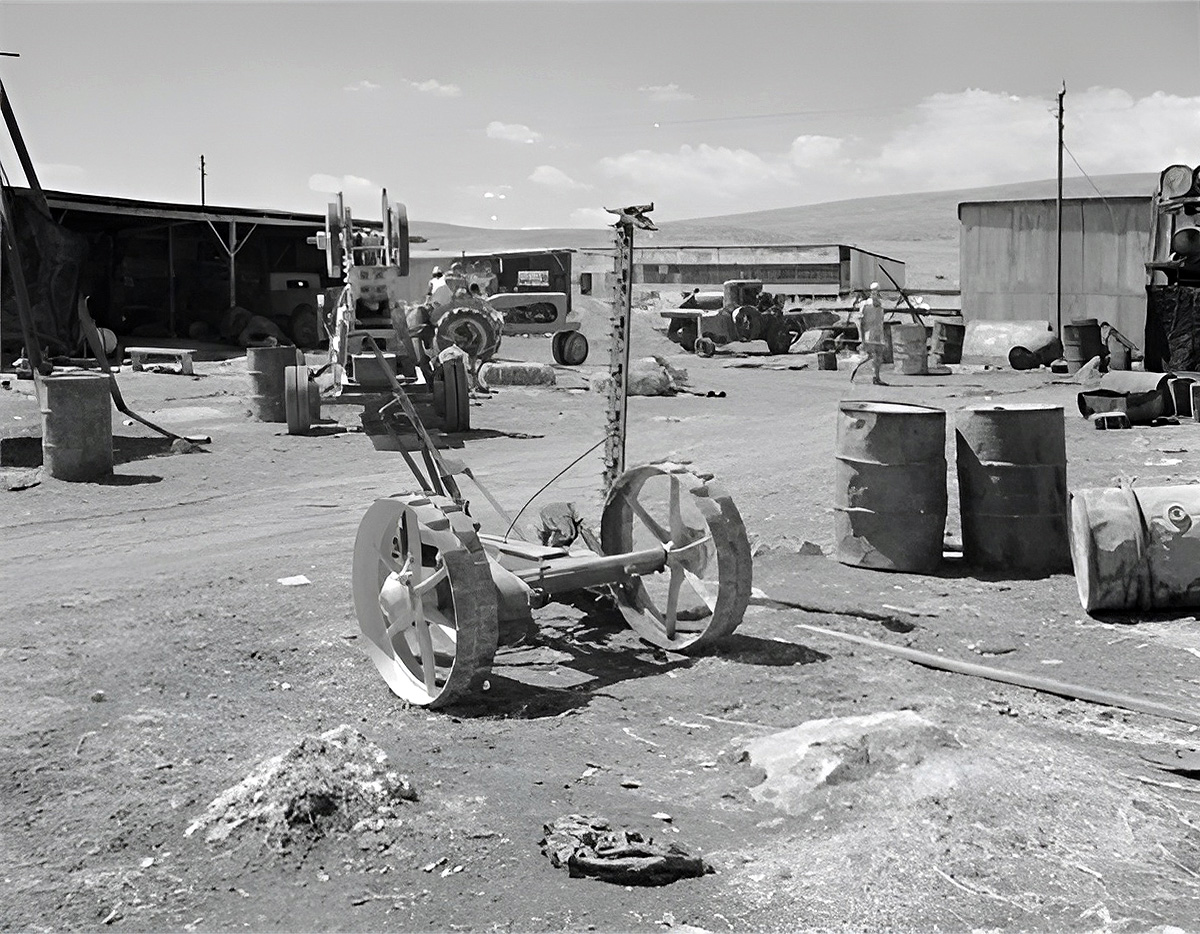
Workshop for agricultural tools in Yiftah, 1949

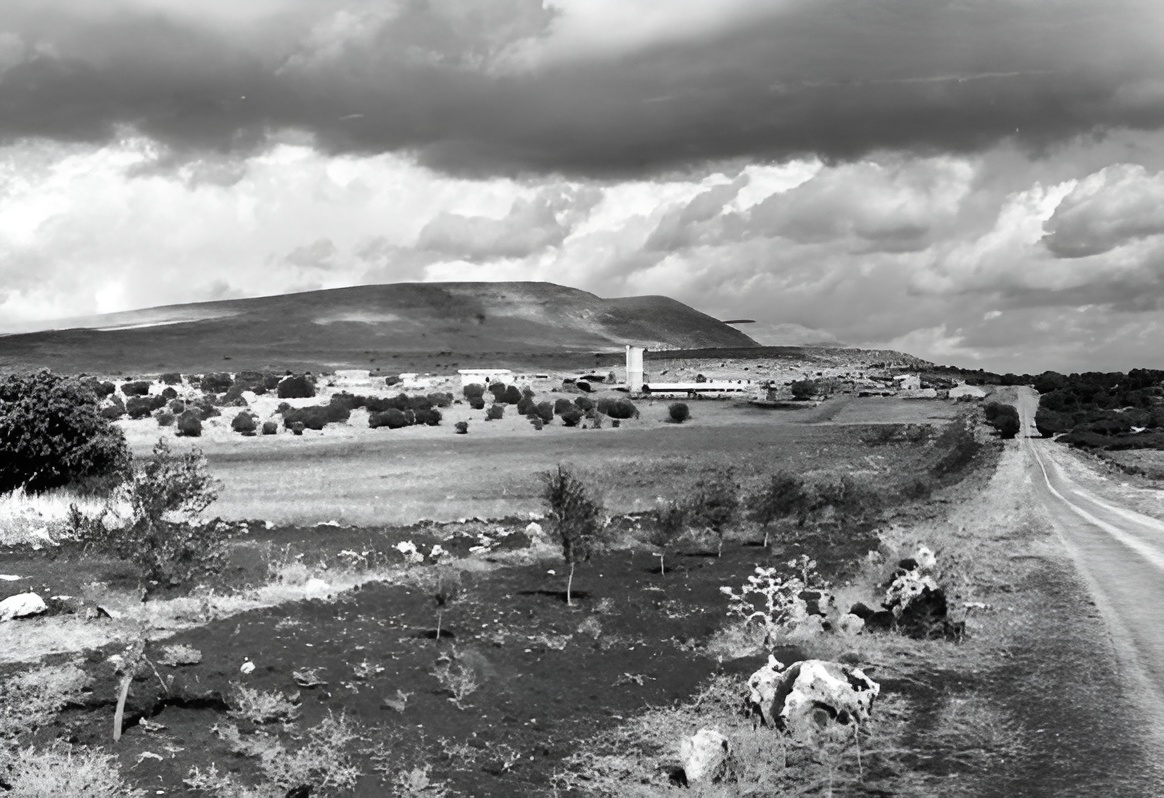
Yiftah fields, 1952

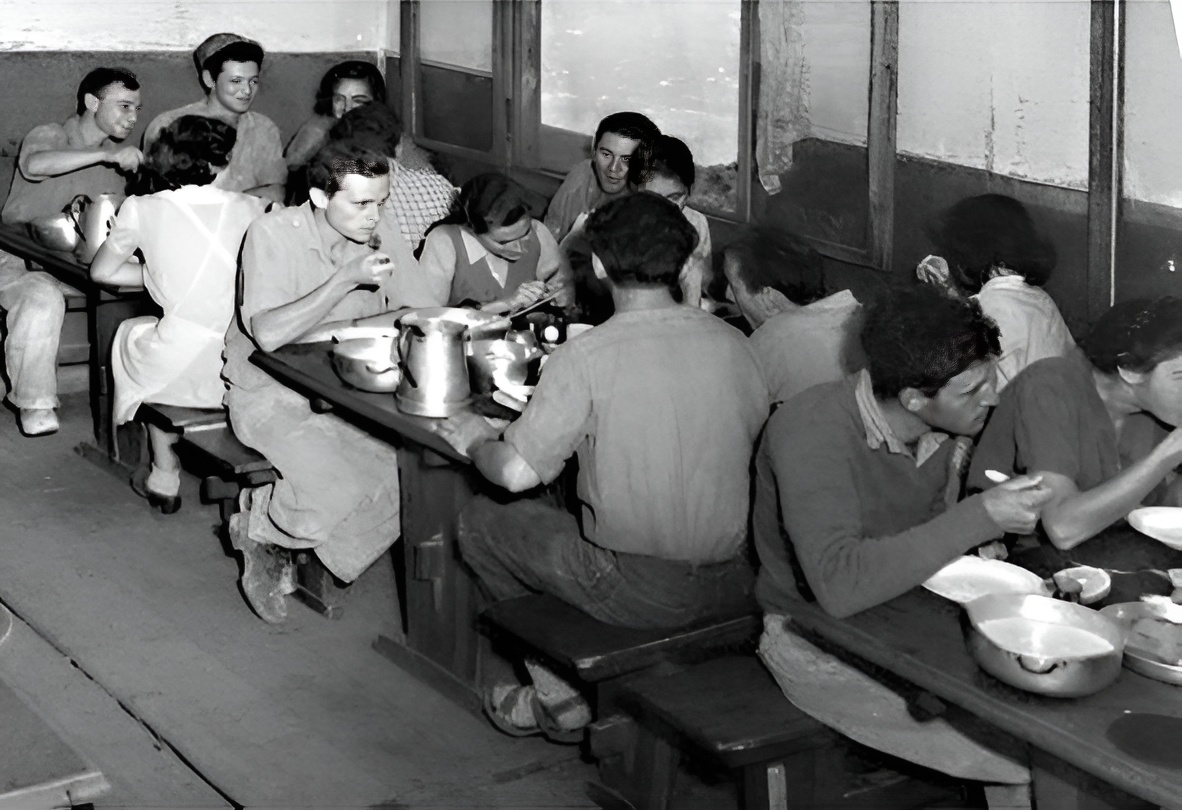
Dining hall of Yiftah, 1952
