= Israeli law =

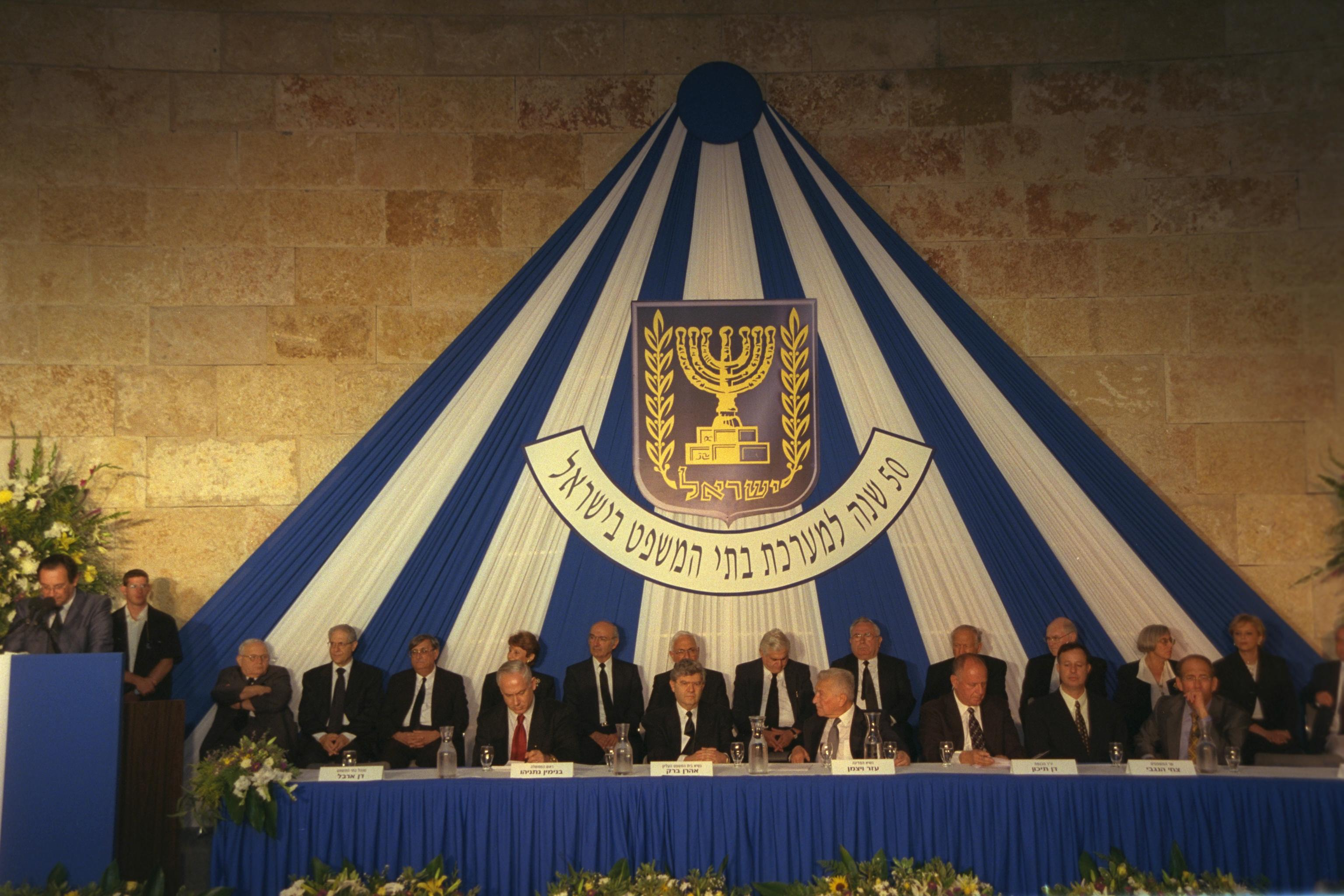
Israeli Supreme Court, 50th anniversary celebration

Israeli law is based mostly on a common law legal system, though it also reflects the diverse history of the territory of the State of Israel throughout the last hundred years (which was at various times prior to independence under Ottoman, then British sovereignty), as well as the legal systems of its major religious communities. The Israeli legal system is based on common law, which also incorporates facets of civil law. The Israeli Declaration of Independence asserted that a formal constitution would be written, though it has been continuously postponed since 1950. Instead, the Basic Laws of Israel (Hebrew: חוקי היסוד, romanized: ḥuqe ha-yesod) function as the country's constitutional laws. Statutes enacted by the Knesset, particularly the Basic Laws, provide a framework which is enriched by political precedent and jurisprudence. Foreign and historical influences on modern-day Israeli law are varied and include the Mecelle (Hebrew: מג'לה; the civil code of the Ottoman Empire) and German civil law, religious law (Jewish Halakha and Muslim Sharia; mostly pertaining in the area of family law), and British common law. The Israeli courts have been influenced in recent years by American Law and Canadian Law and to a lesser extent by Continental Law (mostly from Germany).

== History ==
The core of Israeli law derives from the common law legal system established by the British in the territories they captured during the Palestine Campaign of 1918. This legal system was established by senior judicial officer, Orme Bigland Clarke, who was appointed by General Edmund Allenby in 1918. This legal system continued to operate during the British military administration of Palestine (1917–20) and the civilian government of Mandatory Palestine, which operated under the Palestine Order in Council. This common-law system derived from English law, with certain modifications such as the absence of jury trials. Other aspects of the law were codified, such as the criminal law, which was practically the same as the criminal code used in British India and various other British colonies.

On 14 May 1948 the Israeli Declaration of Independence was signed, declaring the creation of the new State of Israel. This declaration includes a list of principles of the new state:

THE STATE OF ISRAEL will be open for Jewish immigration and for the Ingathering of the Exiles; it will foster the development of the country for the benefit of all its inhabitants; it will be based on freedom, justice and peace as envisaged by the prophets of Israel; it will ensure complete equality of social and political rights to all its inhabitants irrespective of religion, race or sex; it will guarantee freedom of religion, conscience, language, education and culture; it will safeguard the Holy Places of all religions; and it will be faithful to the principles of the Charter of the United Nations.

However, the declaration is not a constitution and the principles outlined have been held to not be legally binding directly by Israeli Supreme Court. Instead, the declaration is seen as a outlining the principles of the Israeli state that are to be taken into account by judges when interpreting legislation or the common law. For example, in Movement for Quality Government in Israel v. The Knesset (2024), president Esther Hayut stated "In my view, the Declaration of Independence, the Basic laws, and the statutes enacted by the Knesset over the years, as well as the case law of this Court, clearly inform us that the identity of the State of Israel as a Jewish and democratic state cannot be questioned – not even by the constituent authority."

The existing British common law as used within Mandatory Palestine at the date of independence remained binding; however it became subject to modification by Israeli judges in developing case law and legislation passed by the Knesset. This reception of existing law was enabled the first legislative act of the Provisional State Council, which enacted a reception statute as part of the "Law and Administration Ordinance" published on 19 May 1948, four days after the Declaration of Independence.

Some aspects of Turkish Ottoman law still remain operational today, such as placing personal status and marriage law in the hands of religious courts. Also the Turks had adopted a Napoleonic-style land-registration system, by documenting land ownership through a sequence of "block and lot entries" to manage and record land ownership. Many Turkish land laws remain in force.

Following independence the young State of Israel was eager to gain recognition in the international arena by joining international treaties and participating heavily in the negotiations of international treaties, e.g., the 1929 Warsaw convention.

During the 1960s there was a rush to codify much of the common law in areas of contracts and torts. The new laws blended common law, local case-law, and fresh ideas. In 1977 the Knesset codified the penal code. Since the 1990s the Israeli Ministry of Justice, together with leading jurists, has been laboring on a complete recodification of all laws pertaining to civil matters. This new proposed civil codex was introduced in 2006, but its adoption through legislation is expected to take many years, if not decades.

As a result of Enclave law, large portions of Israeli law apply in Israeli settlements and to Israeli residents in the occupied territories.

== Court system ==
The Israeli legal system is structured around three main levels of courts, operating in a hierarchical manner: the Magistrate Courts, the District Courts, and the Supreme Court.

The Magistrate Court (Beit Mishpat Hashalom) handles civil cases of less than 2.5 million shekels, excluding disputes over the ownership of land, as well as criminal cases in which the maximum sentence is 7 years. Magistrate Courts are found in most Israeli towns. The Magistrate Court has 6 subdivisions. (1) The Juvenile Court deals with criminal offenses committed by people who were not 18 on the date of prosecution and some issues relating to the removal of children from parental custody. (2) The Family Court deals with all civil cases where the parties are close family members. (3) The Small Claims Court deals with cases of less than 30 thousand shekels. (4) "Hotsa'a Lapoal" is the bailiffs office for judgment debt collection. (5) The Traffic Court deals with all traffic offenses. (6) The Court of Local Issues deals with all offenses prosecuted by local authorities (parking tickets, planning violations etc.).

The District Court (Beit Mishpat Mehozi) serves as the court of first instance in a wide range of cases, including serious criminal offenses, civil claims for amounts exceeding 2.5 million shekels, real estate ownership disputes, and specific issues determined by law. It has jurisdiction over most administrative cases and hears appeals from the Magistrate Court. There are six courts, one in each of Israel's districts: Jerusalem (also has extra jurisdiction of extra territorial matters), Tel Aviv, Haifa, Center (in Petah Tikva), South (in Beer-Sheva), and North (in Nazareth).

The Israeli Supreme Court (Beit Mishpat Elyon) mostly hears appeals from the District Court but also sits as the High Court of Justice (Bagatz), with the authority to review petitions against state authorities, other bodies, or individuals holding public positions. It can adjudicate on any matter it deems necessary for justice, especially those outside the jurisdiction of other courts or tribunals.

The Labour Tribunals (Batei Ha'din Le'avoda) hears all cases where the parties are employer and employee, all cases against the National Insurance Institute and some other socially oriented matters. it is an independent system composed of five district tribunals (Jerusalem, Tel-Aviv, Haifa, South and North) and one national tribunal in Jerusalem (Beit Ha'din Ha'artzi).

There are also religious tribunals in Israel. Some specific legal matters in Israel (e.g., matters of personal status such as marriage and divorce) come under the jurisdiction of the religious tribunal system. There is a list of legally recognized religious communities: Jewish, Muslim, Greek Orthodox Christian, Catholic Christian etc. The small Protestant Christian community in Israel is not recognized; the Jewish community for this purpose does not include the non-Orthodox denominations, Reform and Conservative. Each religious community has its own religious court. For example, Jewish weddings are sanctioned only by the local Religious Council, and divorces of Jews are handled exclusively by the Rabbinical Courts. The judges (dayanim) of the Jewish Rabbinical Courts are all Orthodox rabbis. The Family Court holds parallel authority over matters incidental to divorce, such as property distribution and child custody, enabling both the family and rabbinical courts to address these issues, contingent on the preferences of the couple or individual involved.

The judges of the various courts are chosen by a committee comprising nine members: three Supreme Court Judges, two government ministers (one is the Minister of Justice), two members of the Knesset (one from the opposition), and two representatives of the Israel Bar Association. The composition of the committee is slightly different when it chooses Labour Court Judges or judges of the religious tribunals.

== Current legislative proposals to alter the judicial system ==
The 2023 Israeli judicial reform is a proposed series of changes to the judicial system and the balance of powers in Israel put forward by the current Israeli government, and spearheaded by Deputy Prime Minister and Minister of Justice Yariv Levin and the Chair of the Knesset's Constitution, Law and Justice Committee, Simcha Rothman. It seeks to curb the judiciary's influence over lawmaking and public policy by limiting the Supreme Court's power to exercise judicial review, granting the government control over judicial appointments and limiting the authority of government legal advisors. If adopted, the reform would grant the Knesset the power to override Supreme Court rulings by a majority of 61 or more votes, diminish the ability of the court to conduct judicial review of legislation and of administrative action, prohibit the court from ruling on the constitutionality of basic laws, and change the makeup of the Judicial Selection Committee so that a majority of its members are appointed by the government. The legislation is currently being considered by the Knesset and the relevant committees.

On 12 September 2023, Israel's High Court of Justice (Bagatz) conducted a pivotal session to evaluate the "reasonableness clause." This session led to the annulment of a specific amendment to the Basic Law: The Judiciary. This amendment had previously stipulated that the Court was barred from assessing the reasonableness of decisions made by the government, including those by the Prime Minister and other ministers. The majority ruling granted the High Court the authority to annul Basic Laws and intervene in extreme and exceptional cases where the Knesset exceeds its foundational authority. This decision sparked wide public and political reactions, with significant implications for Israel's democratic framework and the balance of power between its branches of government.

== See also ==
- Basic Laws of Israel
- Israeli land and property laws
- Prevention of Infiltration Law
- Israeli nationality law
- Nazis and Nazi Collaborators (Punishment) Law
- 2023 Israeli judicial reform

== Bibliography ==
- Shimon Shetreet, Walter Homolka, Jewish and Israeli Law – An Introduction, De Gruyter Boston/Berlin 2017.
