= 1952 raid on Beit Jala =

Part of the Arab–Israeli conflict

The 1952 raid on Beit Jala was a part of the reprisal operations that were carried out by Israel in response to Arab fedayeen attacks from across the Green Line. It involved an Israeli incursion into Beit Jala, a town in the Jordanian-annexed West Bank (now a part of the Palestinian territories), on 6 January 1952, after which three houses were rigged with explosives and subsequently blown up; the attack killed seven civilian residents. After the attack, the perpetrators left leaflets at the site that were written in Arabic and explained the nature of the killings as a "penalty" for the earlier rape and murder of an Israeli Jewish girl by Palestinian Arab infiltrators, who were supposedly locals of Beit Jala, in the neighbourhood of Bayit VeGan in Jerusalem.

== Background ==
From the 1949 Armistice Agreements until 1953, Israel had lodged 99 complaints with Jordan concerning the infiltration into Israel of armed groups or individuals from the Jordanian-annexed West Bank, and an additional 30 complaints of Jordanian soldiers crossing the Green Line into Israeli territory. During this time, Jordan had also lodged 5 complaints with Israel concerning the infiltration of armed groups or individuals, and an additional 162 complaints of Israeli soldiers crossing the Green Line into Jordanian territory. One such complaint by Israel concerned the infiltration of an Arab group (led by two individuals who were identified as Muhammad Mansi and Jamil Muhammad Mujarrab) who had raped and murdered a Jewish girl in the neighbourhood of Katamon in Jerusalem in February 1951. Mansi was subsequently detained by Jordanian authorities, but later released and placed on surveillance. Shortly afterwards, Israeli authorities passed on information to the Jordanians that Mansi was stockpiling explosives.

On 4 December 1951, a Jewish girl known as Leah Feistinger, who was walking home from a bus stop in the neighbourhood of Bayit VeGan in Jerusalem, was raped, mutilated, and murdered by an Arab group led by Mansi; her body was found discarded in a cave approximately a mile away from the border between Israel and the Jordanian-annexed West Bank, inside Israeli territory.

Major Loreaux, an investigating officer from the Mixed Armistice Commissions (MAC) of the United Nations, reported to chairmen Commander E. H. Hutchison and Commandant G. Bouvet that the Jewish girl had been raped and murdered, with her face mutilated. He also reported that he saw no evidence of infiltration from Jordanian territory and suggested that Israeli police investigate the incident.

Israel stated that the perpetrators were three Arab residents from Beit Jala: Saïd Salah Jamʽan, Jamil Muhammad Mujarrab, and Muhammad Mansi.

== Reprisal raid ==
Following an Israeli incursion into the Jordanian-annexed West Bank on 6 January 1952, three houses in Beit Jala were rigged with explosives and blown up. According to Hutchison, the upper floor of the first house was completely destroyed; the lower part of the house, which had been built into the side of the hill, was still partially intact, with bullet holes visible in the walls and doors. The inhabitants, a 23-year-old man and his wife, were killed in the blast. The second house had damage on one wall that was pockmarked with bullets and had shattered windows. In the third house, a woman and her four children, ranging in age from 6 to 14, were found dead. When one of the demolition charges allegedly failed, the attackers used grenades.

After the attack, the perpetrators left leaflets at the site, which were written in Arabic and read as follows:

On 4/12/1951 some persons from among the inhabitants of Beit Jala killed a Jewish girl in the neighbourhood of Bayit VeGan, after committing against her an unpardonable crime. What we have done now is the penalty for that ugly crime. We shall not stand idly by in the face of such crimes. In our quiver there are always arrows for [such criminals]. Let those who can, heed this warning.

— Translated by Benny Morris (1997)

في ٤/١٢/١٩٥١ قتل اشخاص من بلدة (بيت جالا) فتاة يهودية بالقرب من (بايت وغان) بعد ان اقترفوا حقها جريمة لا تغتفر

إن ما قمنا به الآن هو جزاء هذه الجريمة الشنعاء ولن نسكت للمجرمين ففي جعبتنا دائماً سهاماً لهم

فليعتبر المعتبرون

— Retrieved by E. H. Hutchison

== Investigation ==
Major Hutchison investigated the Jordanian complaint against Israel concerning the latter's violation of the 1949 Armistice Agreements at Beit Jala, on behalf of the United Nations Truce Supervision Organization (UNTSO). Israel denied any involvement and J. E. Chadwick, a diplomat at the British embassy in Tel Aviv thought that it had been the work of Israeli vigilantes. Hutchison reported that the demolition charges had Israeli markings and that machine-guns were also used during the attack. Benny Morris concludes that the raid was carried out by an Israeli military platoon, and that Western diplomats were not convinced that the Feistinger rape and murder had been carried out by infiltrators from the Jordanian-annexed West Bank. In April 1953, the consul-general of the United States in Jerusalem wrote: "It was never shown that the act was not committed by her Israeli boy-friend".

== Reactions ==
The UNTSO issued a condemnation of Israel for its "serious breach of the General Armistice Agreement" through its raid in the town of Beit Jala. Israel denied any military involvement in the attack and abstained from voting while both Jordan and the chairman of the MAC voted to condemn Israel. John Bagot Glubb, the then-chief of the Arab Legion, stated that the Israelis had a "psychological need to bully their weaker neighbours". Conversely, the British embassy in Tel Aviv referred to the nature of the raids as "simple reprisals, designed to make Arab infiltration unpopular in the Arab villages". The British ambassador compared the Israeli raids to British reprisals against the Egyptians around the Suez Canal.

== See also ==
- Israeli war crimes
- Qibya massacre, a 1953 Israeli reprisal operation in which 69 Palestinian Arab civilians were killed
- Israel's Border Wars, 1949–1956
