= Jahula =

Jahula جاحولا
- Etymology: Ain Jahula=The spring of the large rock
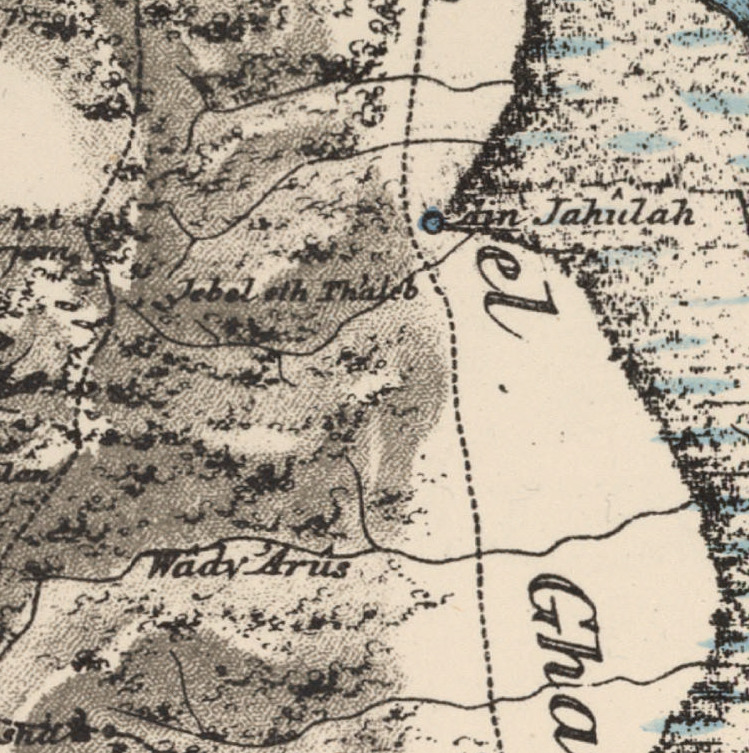
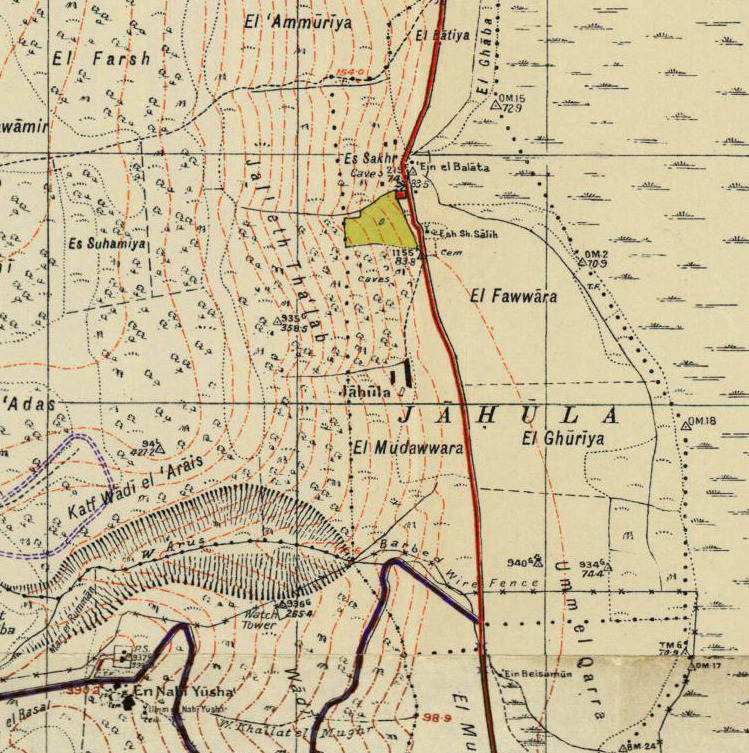
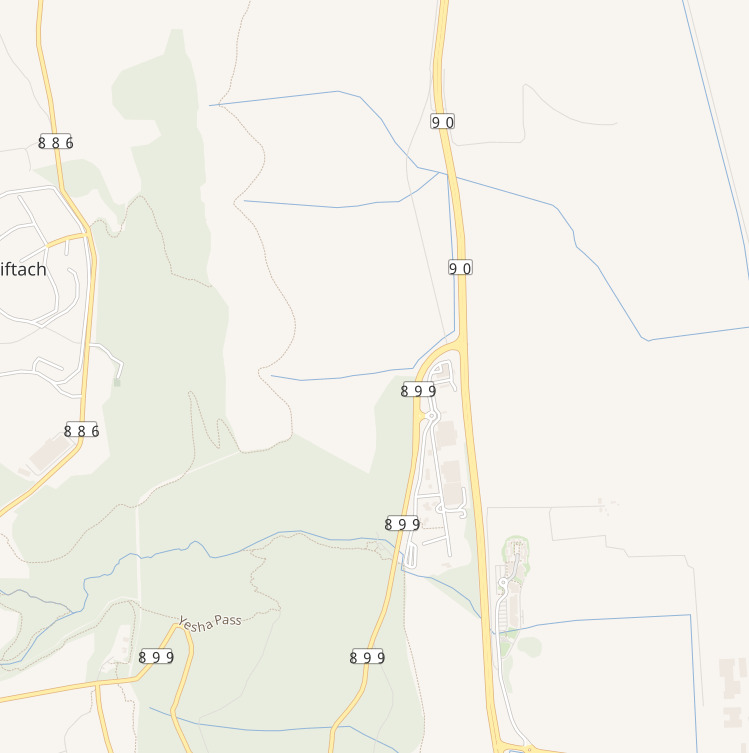
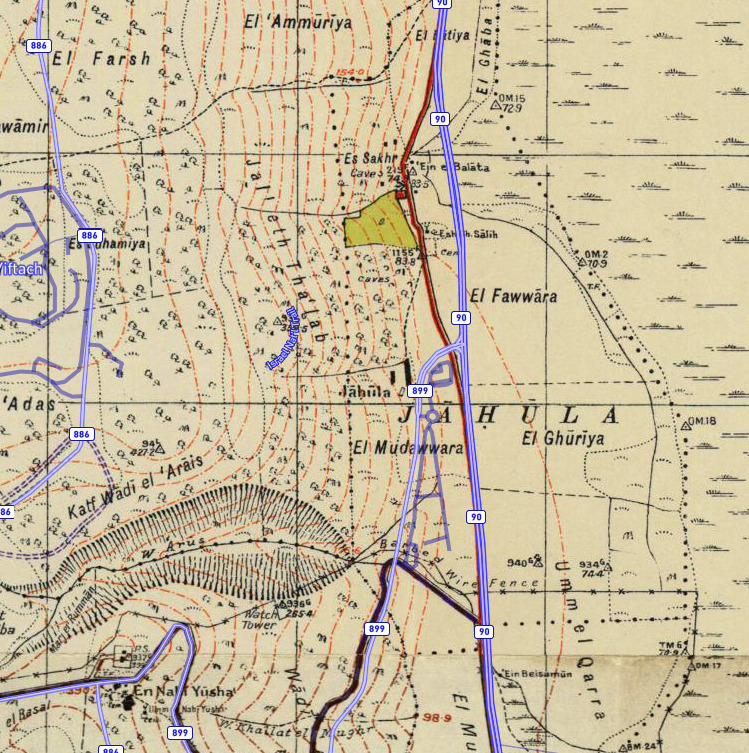
- 1870s map 1940s map modern map 1940s with modern overlay map A series of historical maps of the area around Jahula (click the buttons)

- Location within Mandatory Palestine
- Coordinates: 33°07′29″N 35°34′02″E
- Palestine grid: 203/281
- Geopolitical entity: Mandatory Palestine
- Subdistrict: Safad
- Date of depopulation: May, 1948

Area
  - Total: 3,869 dunams (3.869 km^{2}; 1.494 sq mi)

Population (1945)
  - Total: 420

Jahula (Arabic: جاحولا) was a Palestinian Arab village in the Safad Subdistrict. It was depopulated during the 1947–1948 civil war in Mandatory Palestine on May 1, 1948, by the Palmach's First Battalion of Operation Yiftach. It was located 11 km northeast of Safad.

In 1945, the village had a population of 420. The village had one mosque and a shrine for a local sage known as al-Shaykh Salih.

== Location ==
Jahula was situated near the Tiberias— Al-Mutilla highway, in the foothills.

== History ==
The Jahula area had been occupied from the seventh through the third millennium BC, according to archaeological excavations conducted in 1986. Pottery remains from the Roman and Byzantine periods have been found in the area.

=== Ottoman era ===
Jahula was recorded in the Ottoman census of 1596 as belonging to the nahiya (subdistrict) of Jira, part of Safad Sanjak, and at the time it had 5 Muslim households; an estimated population of 28 inhabitants. They paid a fixed tax rate of 20% on crops such as wheat and barley, and reared goats, bees, and water buffalos. Total revenue was 1,550 akçe.

In 1838, it was noted as a village in the Safad district, while in 1875 Victor Guérin report passing through the village (which he called Kharbet Djaouleh), finding only a few of the houses inhabited.

In 1881, the PEF's Survey of Western Palestine found at Ain Jahula "a large perennial spring, with a stream flowing to the march of the Huleh; a large supply of good water".

The villagers of Jahula were predominantly Muslim. Their mosque, about 1 km north of the village, was the location of a shrine to Shaykh Salih.

Most villagers were engaged in agriculture, and a spring on the north side of the village supplied water. Some villagers worked in quarries north of the village.

=== British Mandate era ===
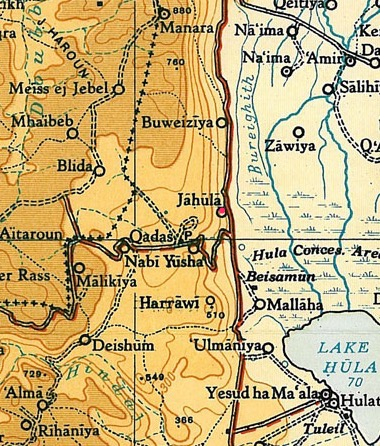
Jahula, 1945. Survey of Palestine. Scale 1:250,000.

In the 1922 census of Palestine, conducted by the British Mandate authorities, Jahula had a population of 214; all Muslims, increasing in the 1931 census to 357; still all Muslims, in a total of 90 houses.

In the 1945 statistics Jahula had a population of 420 Muslims, with 3,869 dunums of land, according to an official land and population survey. 1,626 dunums were allocated to grain farming, while 64 dunams were classified as urban land.

=== 1948, and aftermath ===
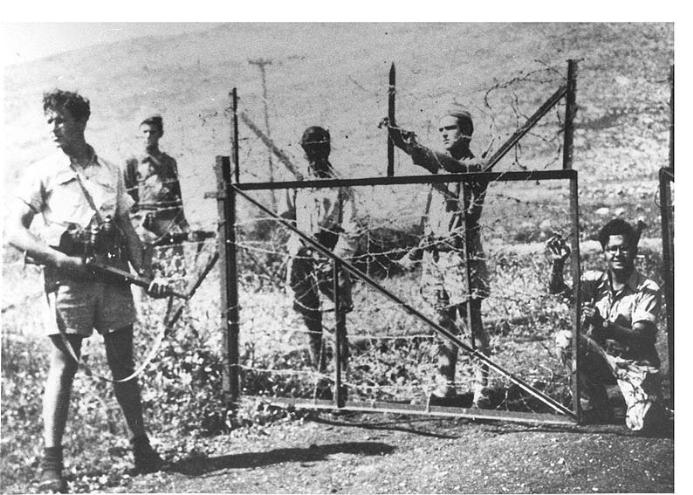
Yiftach Brigade erecting fencing. Jahula. 1948.

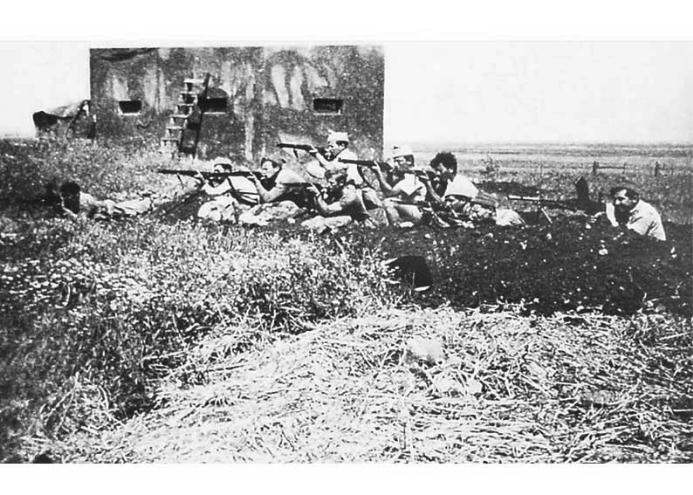
Yiftach Brigade defensive positions. Jahula. 1948.

Jahula was depopulated during the 1947–1948 civil war in Mandatory Palestine on May 1, 1948, by the Palmach's First Battalion of Operation Yiftach. Benny Morris writes that the cause of depopulation is unknown, while the American Historian Rosemarie Esber gives as depopulation cause: "Direct mortar attacks on civilians, siege, shooting at fleeing Arabs".

Presently, the Israeli Kibbutz of Yiftach is 2 kilometers (1.2 mi) northwest of the village site; there are no settlements on village lands.

Of the village site the Palestinian historian Walid Khalidi wrote in 1992: "The only remains of the destroyed village are a few stone terraces. The site is enclosed by barbed wire, and cactuses and trees grow on it. The village spring is still in use by Israelis. Parts of the village land are planted in cotton and watermelons, while other parts are wooded and hilly."

== Bibliography ==
- Barron, J.B., ed. (1923). Palestine: Report and General Abstracts of the Census of 1922. Government of Palestine.
- Conder, C.R.; Kitchener, H.H. (1881). The Survey of Western Palestine: Memoirs of the Topography, Orography, Hydrography, and Archaeology. Vol. 1. London: Committee of the Palestine Exploration Fund.
- Department of Statistics (1945). Village Statistics, April, 1945. Government of Palestine.
- Esber, R. (2008). Under the Cover of War, The Zionist Expulsions of the Palestinians. Arabicus Books & Media. ISBN 978-0981513171.
- Guérin, V. (1880). Description Géographique Historique et Archéologique de la Palestine (in French). Vol. 3: Galilee, pt. 2. Paris: L'Imprimerie Nationale.
- Hütteroth, W.-D.; Abdulfattah, K. (1977). Historical Geography of Palestine, Transjordan and Southern Syria in the Late 16th Century. Erlanger Geographische Arbeiten, Sonderband 5. Erlangen, Germany: Vorstand der Fränkischen Geographischen Gesellschaft. ISBN 3-920405-41-2.
- Hadawi, S. (1970). Village Statistics of 1945: A Classification of Land and Area ownership in Palestine. Palestine Liberation Organization Research Center.
- Khalidi, W. (1992). All That Remains: The Palestinian Villages Occupied and Depopulated by Israel in 1948. Washington D.C.: Institute for Palestine Studies. ISBN 0-88728-224-5.
- Mills, E., ed. (1932). Census of Palestine 1931. Population of Villages, Towns and Administrative Areas. Jerusalem: Government of Palestine.
- Mokary, Abdalla (2009-09-30). "Yiftah Final Report" (121). Hadashot Arkheologiyot – Excavations and Surveys in Israel.
- Morris, B. (2004). The Birth of the Palestinian Refugee Problem Revisited. Cambridge University Press. ISBN 978-0-521-00967-6.
- Palmer, E.H. (1881). The Survey of Western Palestine: Arabic and English Name Lists Collected During the Survey by Lieutenants Conder and Kitchener, R. E. Transliterated and Explained by E.H. Palmer. Committee of the Palestine Exploration Fund.
- Robinson, E.; Smith, E. (1841). Biblical Researches in Palestine, Mount Sinai and Arabia Petraea: A Journal of Travels in the year 1838. Vol. 3. Boston: Crocker & Brewster.
- Rhode, H. (1979). Administration and Population of the Sancak of Safed in the Sixteenth Century (PhD). Columbia University. Archived from the original on 2020-03-01.
