= Rachel Maccabi =

- רחל מכבי
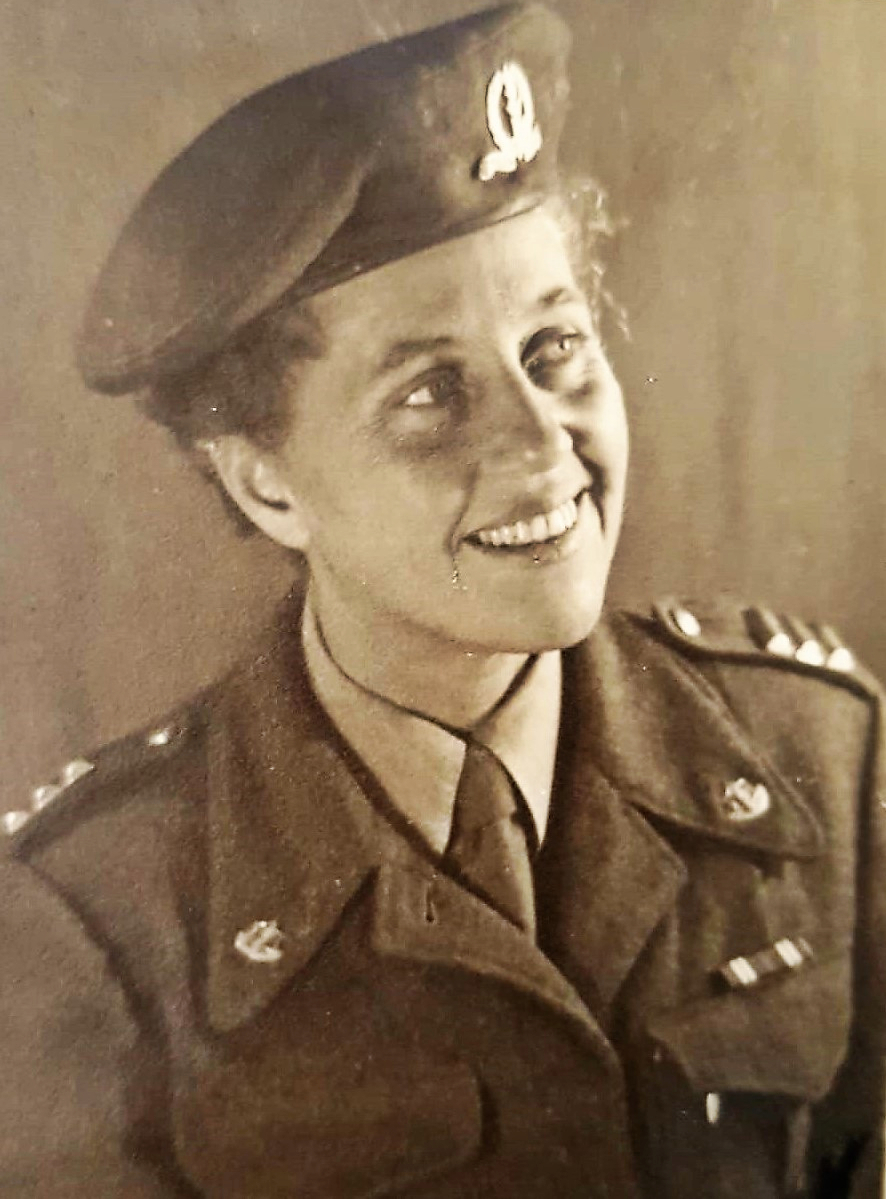
- Rachel Maccabi, 1955
- Born: Marie-Louise Green; November 10, 1915; Alexandria, Sultanate of Egypt
- Died: October 12, 2003 (aged 87); Kibbutz Hatzor
- Burial place: Kibbutz Hatzor
- Citizenship: Israel
- Notable work: My Egypt (memoirs)
- Title: Writer
- Spouse: Maccabee Mosseri-Mani/Maccabi Mutzary-Meni/Motzri-Mani

Rachel Maccabi, also spelled Rahel Maccabi (Hebrew: רחל מכבי; November 10, 1915 – October 12, 2003), was a Palmach member and Israeli writer born in Egypt.

== Youth, education, Zionist beginnings ==
Rachel Maccabi was born in 1915 as Marie-Louise Green in Alexandria, Egypt, into a prosperous Zionist family. Her father, Felix Green, was a wealthy agronomist, a senior member of the Jewish community, and one of the leaders of the local Zionist movement. Her mother, Jeanine, was the daughter of Baron Félix de Menasce.

In her youth, Marie-Louise Green studied at a French gymnasium in her hometown of Alexandria. After finishing high school, she studied law.

Her upbringing was deeply influenced by the Zionist movement, which advocated for the establishment of a Jewish homeland in Palestine. She was active in the Hashomer Hatzair youth movement. Beginning in 1925, she made several visits to Mandatory Palestine and fell in love with the land. However, she profoundly disliked the form of Zionist movement characterised by what she called "donations and contributions", which led her to abandon the Zionist idea. In 1968 she published her impressions of her initial visits to the Land of Israel in her book "My Egypt."

Joel Beinin has a critical view of the Eurocentric attitude passed on by Marie-Louise's mother, which meant that her daughter never had any meaningful contact to Egyptians, not even to traditionally living local Jews, and never learned Arabic beyond a few words, anything Arab or Egyptian being regarded as primitive, inferior, or frightening. Even her father's family, originally from central Europe but thoroughly Arabised, was regarded as "others", with only some exotic memories of flowers and food being later remembered in a more nostalgic light.

== Marriage and War of Independence (1935-1949) ==
During one of her visits to Tel Aviv, she met Maccabee Mosseri-Mani (1914-1948), the son of the Egyptian Zionist activists Albert (1867-1933) and Matilda Mazal Mosseri (1894-1981, née Mani). In 1935, they married in Egypt and decided to immigrate to the Land of Israel. She later changed her name to Rachel (inspired by the poet Rachel Bluwstein Sela) and lived with Maccabee in Moshav Tel Tzur (today part of Even Yehuda). In 1937, their eldest son, Oded, was born. He would die in 1964 of cancer. A daughter, Alona, followed. Their family surname is spelled by Israeli researcher Ilana Rosen as Mutzary-Meni, and her husband's given name as Maccabi.

In 1938, her father, Felix Green, was murdered in Alexandria by a burglar who broke into his house.

During the 1948 Arab-Israeli War, her husband was appointed to the Harel Brigade (a reserve brigade of the Israel Defense Forces). He was mortally wounded in an ambush in Dayr Ayyub and two days later died of his wounds. After Maccabi's death, Rachel adopted her late husband's first name, Maccabi, as her last name and decided to continue on his path. She enlisted in the Israel Defense Forces and served as the secretary of Yigal Alon.

== Life in Israel, writing career, death ==
Rachel Maccabi remained in Israel for the rest of her life. In the early 1950s she met Lovka (Aryeh) Sternin from Kibbutz Hatzor, who would become her second husband. He died in 1990. Of their two sons, Yoash and Avishai, Yoash would fall in the 1973 Yom Kippur War. Rachel Maccabi stayed in Kibbutz Hatzor and dedicated herself to writing memoirs drawing from her life story, publishing five such books Mitzrayim sheli ("My Egypt", 1968) Hol va'alonim ("Sand and Oak Trees", 1972), Leilot yerushalayim ("Jerusalem Nights", 1978), Behiyukh uvedema: sipurim ("With Smiles and Tears: Stories", 1986) and Avir harim ("Mountain Air", 1992). Her works tell the story of her youth in Alexandria, her life in Mandatory Israel, the events of the 1948 Arab-Israeli War, her early years of service in the IDF, and her life in the kibbutz.

Rachel died on October 12, 2003, and was buried in her kibbutz.
