= Operation Harel =

Israeli military operation

Operation Harel (Hebrew: מבצע הראל) was an operation conducted by the Palmach during the 1948 Palestine war. Its two objectives were to bring food and supplies to besieged Jerusalem, and to transport troops near the city. The operation took place between 15 and 21 April as a continuation to Operation Nachshon and was commanded by Yitzhak Rabin. It brought three convoys of over 600 trucks. It also resulted in the formation of Palmach battalions into the Harel Brigade. The supplying of Jerusalem with food, medicine, arms, and fuel, enabled the city to withstand the siege, a siege which continued for the next two months, until the opening of the Burma Road in mid-June.

== Operation ==
Operation Harel, along with Operation Nachshon and Operation Yevusi, was conducted to implement Plan Dalet by occupying the main Arab sites of Jerusalem. Operation Harel was a continuation of Operation Nachshon, which had a goal of taking the corridor between Tel Aviv and Jerusalem, and lasted from 15–21 April 1948.

The operation was commanded by Yitzhak Rabin and conducted by the Palmach, which organised itself into the Fourth Battalion under Joseph Tabenkin and the Fifth Battalion under Menachem Rusek. The 54th Battalion of the Givati Brigade also participated in the operation.

== Aftermath ==
The Palestinian villages of Biddu and Beit Surik were partially destroyed. Saris was captured during the operation and later depopulated. The village of Qalunya was destroyed during the operation and later abandoned by its inhabitants.

== Works cited ==
=== Books ===
- Khalaily, Hamoudi; Re'em, Amit; Vardi, Jacob; Milevski, Ianir (2020). The Mega Project at Motza (Moẓa): The Neolithic and Later Occupations up to the 20th Century. Israel Antiquities Authority. ISBN 9789654067157.
- Morris, Benny (2008). 1948: A History of the First Arab-Israeli War. Yale University Press. ISBN 9780300126969.

=== Journals ===
- Nazzal, Nafez (1974). "The Zionist Occupation of Western Galilee, 1948". Journal of Palestine Studies. 3 (3). Taylor & Francis: 58–76. doi:10.2307/2535892. JSTOR 2535892.
- Shalash, Bilal (2021). "Proving and Silencing: How Palestinian Fighters Ended "Annexation" (15 May 1948 – January 1949) in the writings of Qasim Al-Rimawi on al-Jihad al-Muqaddas". Al-Muntaqa: New Perspectives on Arab Studies. 4 (1). Arab Center for Research and Policy Studies: 56–77. doi:10.31430/almuntaqa.4.1.0056. JSTOR almuntaqa.4.1.0056.

=== News ===
- "כפר סריס נהרס, דבר" [Kfar Saris was destroyed] (in Hebrew). Davar. 18 April 1948.

=== Web ===
- "מבצע הראל" [Operation Harel] (in Hebrew). Palmach Museum. Archived from the original on 1 November 2026.
