= 252nd Division =

252nd Division may refer to:

- 252nd Infantry Division (Wehrmacht), Germany
- 252nd Division (Israel)
- 252nd Rifle Division, Soviet Union

== See also ==
- List of military divisions by number
