= Shoresh =

Shoresh: שֹׁרֶשׁ, שורש (Hebrew)
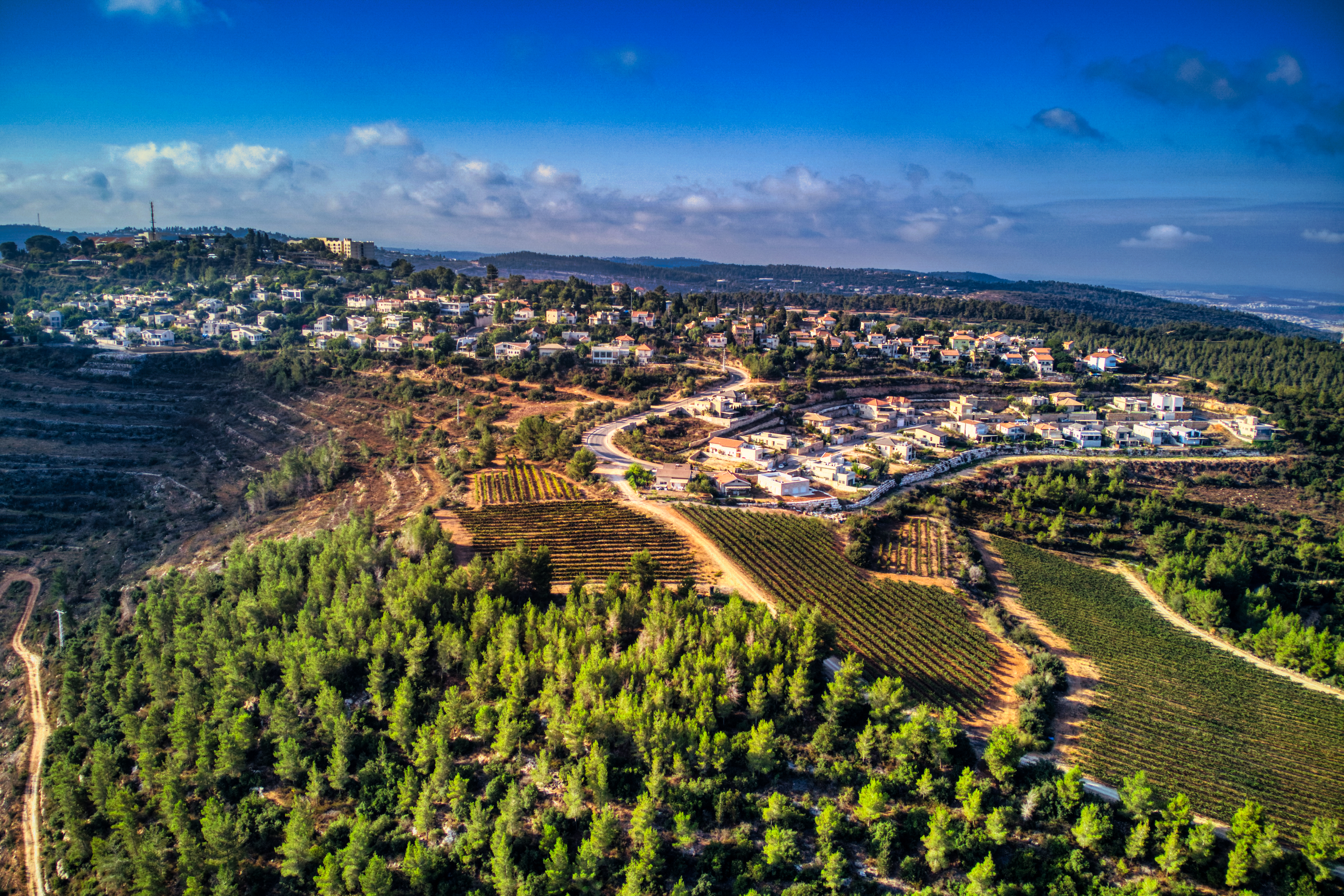

- Location within Jerusalem District
- Coordinates: 31°47′48″N 35°3′55″E
- Country: Israel
- District: Jerusalem
- Council: Mateh Yehuda
- Affiliation: HaOved HaTzioni
- Founded: 1948
- Founder: Eastern European Jewish immigrants
- Area: 7,500 dunams (7.5 km^{2}; 2.9 sq mi)
- Population (2024): 1,399
  - Density: 190/km^{2} (480/sq mi)

Shoresh (Hebrew: שורש, שֹׁרֶשׁ, lit. Root / source) is a moshav shitufi in central Israel. Located five kilometres from Sha'ar HaGai in the Jerusalem corridor, it falls under the jurisdiction of Mateh Yehuda Regional Council. In 2024 it had a population of 1,399.

== History ==
On 15 April 1948, the Harel Brigade captured the Palestinian village of Saris overlooking the highway to Jerusalem. The strategic hilltop position had been used to fire on Jewish vehicles travelling on the road below. Later that year, a group of immigrants from Eastern Europe founded a kibbutz on the site, they called him 'Shoresh' after the biblical village of Soris, which was, according to the Septuagint translation of the Book of Joshua, located in the territory of the Tribe of Judah. The biblical name was preserved in the name of the nearby Palestinian village, Saris. Four years later, it became a moshav. Today Shoresh operates a hotel, conference center and banquet hall.

In July 1995, a fire destroyed the moshav's poultry and orchard industries, damaged the hotel, and left over half the moshav members homeless.

== Notable residents ==
- Anastasia Gloushkov, Olympic synchronized swimmer
- Matan Vilnai
- Eli Avidar
