= Plan Dalet =

1948 military plan in Mandatory Palestine

- Part of the 1948 Palestine war and the Nakba
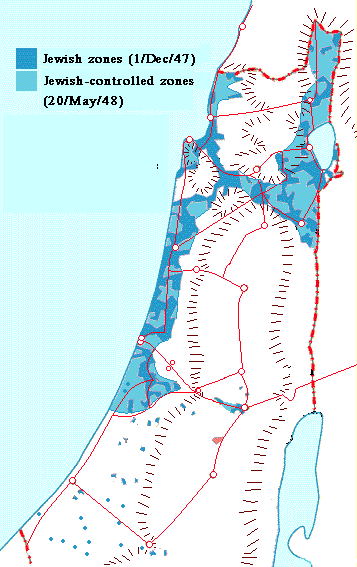
- Zones controlled by Yishuv before and after the implementation of the Plan Dalet.
- Type: Ethnic cleansing
- Location: Mandatory Palestine
- Planned by: Jewish Agency and Haganah
- Commanded by: David Ben Gurion
- Target: Palestinian Arab villages and cities
- Objective: Conquest of Mandatory Palestine
- Date: March 10, 1948 – early 1949
- Executed by: Israel: Haganah; Palmach; Irgun; Lehi
- Outcome: Expulsion and flight of more than half of Mandatory Palestine's Palestinian Arab population; Over 500 Arab villages destroyed or depopulated

Plan Dalet (Hebrew: תוכנית ד', Tokhnit dalet "Plan D"; 1 April – 14 May, 1948) was a Zionist military plan executed during the 1948 Palestine war for the conquest of territory in Mandatory Palestine in preparation for the establishment of a Jewish state. The plan was the blueprint for Israel's military operations, starting in March 1948 until the end of the war in early 1949, and so played a central role in the 1948 Palestinian expulsion and flight known as the Nakba.

The plan was requested by the Jewish Agency leader and later first prime minister of Israel David Ben-Gurion, and developed by the Haganah and finalized on March 10, 1948. Historians describe Plan Dalet as the beginning of a new phase in the 1948 Palestine war in which Zionist forces shifted to an offensive strategy.

The plan was a set of guidelines to take control of Mandatory Palestine, declare a Jewish state, and defend its borders and people, including the Jewish population outside of the borders, "before, and in anticipation of" the invasion by regular Arab armies. Plan Dalet specifically included gaining control of areas wherever Yishuv populations existed, including those outside the borders of the proposed Jewish state.

The plan's tactics involved laying siege to Palestinian Arab villages, bombing neighbourhoods of cities, forced expulsion of their inhabitants, and setting fields and houses on fire and detonating TNT in the rubble to prevent any return. Zionist military units possessed detailed lists of neighborhoods and villages to be destroyed and their Arab inhabitants expelled. One of the first and most well known operations of Plan Dalet was the Deir Yassin massacre.

This strategy is subject to controversy, with some historians characterizing it as defensive, while others assert that it was an integral part of a planned strategy for the expulsion, sometimes called an ethnic cleansing, of the area's native inhabitants.

== Etymology ==
Its name comes from the letter Dalet (ד), the fourth letter of the Hebrew alphabet, after plans named Aleph (א), Bet (ב), and Gimel (ג) were revised.

== Background ==
=== Avnir plan ===
In the summer of 1937, the commander of their forces in the Tel Aviv area, Elimelech Slikowitz (nicknamed Avnir) received an order from Ben-Gurion, according to the official history of the Haganah. Ben-Gurion, anticipating an eventual British withdrawal from the country after the Peel Report, asked Avnir to prepare a plan for the military conquest of the whole of Palestine. This Avnir Plan provided a blueprint for future plans. The blueprint was refined in subsequent adjustments (A, B, C) before emerging in its final form over a decade later as Plan Dalet.

=== Four adjustments ===
From 1945 onward, the Haganah designed four general military plans, the implementation of the final version of which eventually led to the creation of Israel and the dispossession of the Palestinians:

- Plan Aleph (Plan A), drawn up in February 1945 to complement the political aim of a unilateral declaration of independence. It was designed to suppress Palestinian Arab resistance to the Zionist takeover of parts of Palestine.
- Plan Bet (Plan B), produced in September 1945, emerged in May 1947 and was designed to replace Plan Aleph in the context of new developments such as Britain's submission of the problem of Palestine to the United Nations and growing opposition from surrounding Arab states to the Zionist partition plan.
- Plan Gimel (Plan C), also known as "May Plan", produced in May 1946, emerged in November/December 1947, in the wake of the UN Partition Plan. It was designed to enhance Zionist military and police mobilisation and enable action as needed.
- Plan Dalet (Plan D), of March 1948, is the most noteworthy. Guided by a series of specific operational plans, the broad outlines of which were considered as early as 1944, Plan Dalet was drawn up to expand Jewish-held areas beyond those allocated to the proposed Jewish State in the UN Partition Plan. Its overall objective was to seize as much territory as possible in advance of the termination of the British Mandate—when the Zionist leaders planned to declare their state.

=== UN Partition plan ===
On November 29, 1947, the United Nations voted to approve the Partition Plan for Palestine for ending the British Mandate and recommending the establishment of an Arab state and a Jewish state. In the immediate aftermath of the UN's approval of the Partition plan, the Jewish community expressed joy, while the Arab community expressed discontent. On the day after the vote, a spate of Arab attacks left at least eight Jews dead, one in Tel Aviv by sniper fire, and seven in ambushes on civilian buses that were claimed to be retaliations for a Lehi raid ten days earlier.

From January onward, operations became increasingly militarized, with the intervention of a number of regiments of the Arab Liberation Army (consisting of volunteers from Arab countries) inside Palestine, each active in a variety of distinct sectors around the different coastal towns. They consolidated their presence in Galilee and Samaria. Abd al-Qadir al-Husayni came from Egypt with several hundred men of the Army of the Holy War. Having recruited a few thousand volunteers, al-Husayni organised the blockade of the 100,000 Jewish residents of Jerusalem. To counter this, the Yishuv authorities tried to supply the Jews of the city with food by using convoys of up to 100 armoured vehicles, but the operation became more and more impractical as the number of casualties in the relief convoys surged. By March, Al-Hussayni's tactic, sometimes called "The War of the Roads", had paid off. Almost all of Haganah's armoured vehicles had been destroyed, the blockade was in full operation, and the Haganah had lost more than 100 troops. According to Benny Morris, the situation for those who dwelt in the Jewish settlements in the highly isolated Negev and North of Galilee was equally critical. According to Ilan Pappé, in early March, the Yishuv's security leadership did not seem to regard the overall situation as particularly troubling, but instead was busy finalising a master plan.

This situation caused the United States to withdraw their support for the Partition plan, thus encouraging the Arab League to believe that the Palestinians, reinforced by the Arab Liberation Army, could put an end to partition. The British, meanwhile, decided on 7 February 1948, to support the annexation of the Arab part of Palestine by Transjordan.

== Plan Dalet ==
In 1947, David Ben-Gurion reorganised Haganah and made conscription obligatory. Every Jewish man and woman in the country had to receive military training. Military equipment was procured from stockpiles from the Second World War and from Czechoslovakia and was brought in Operation Balak. There is some disagreement among historians about the precise authors of Plan Dalet. According to some, it was the result of the analysis of Yigael Yadin, at that time the temporary head of the Haganah, after Ben-Gurion invested him with the responsibility to come up with a plan in preparation for the announced intervention of the Arab states. According to Ilan Pappé the plan was conceived by the "consultancy", a group of about a dozen military and security figures and specialists on Arab affairs, under the guidance of Ben-Gurion. It was finalised and sent to Haganah units in early March 1948. The plan consisted of a general part and operational orders for the brigades, which specified which villages should be targeted and other specific missions. The general section of the plan was also sent to the Yishuv's political leaders.

=== Text ===
The Hebrew text of Plan Dalet was published in 1972 in volume 3, part 3 of Sefer Toldot Hahaganah (ספר תולדות ההגנה History of the Haganah), Appendix 48, pp. 1955-60. An English translation of the text of Plan Dalet was published for the first time as an appendix to Khalidi's 1988 reprint of "Plan Dalet: Master Plan for the Conquest of Palestine" in the Journal of Palestine Studies.

=== Purpose ===
In this plan, the Haganah also started the transformation from an underground organization into a regular army. The reorganization included the formation of brigades and front commands. The stated goals included in addition to the reorganization, gaining control of the areas of the planned Jewish state as well as areas of Jewish settlements outside its borders. The control would be attained by fortifying strongholds in the surrounding areas and roads, conquering Arab villages close to Jewish settlements and occupying British bases and police stations (from which the British were withdrawing).

The introduction of the plan states:

(a) The objective of this plan is to gain control of the areas of the Hebrew state and defend its borders. It also aims at gaining control of the areas of Jewish settlements and concentrations which are located outside the borders (of the Hebrew state) against regular, semi-regular, and small forces operating from bases outside or inside the state.
(b) This plan is based on three previous plans:
1. Plan B, September 1945.
2. The May 1946 Plan [this is Plan Gimel]
3. Yehoshua Plan, 1948 [an earlier version of Plan Dalet named after Yehoshua Globerman, a Haganah commander killed December 1947]
(c) Since these plans were designed to deal with the situation inside the country (the first two plans deal with the first phase of incidents, while the third plan deals with the possibility of invasion by regular armies from the neighboring countries), the aim of Plan D is to fill the gaps in the previous three plans and to make them more suitable for the situation expected to obtain at the end of British rule in the country.

Later on, the plan states:

f) Generally, the aim of this plan is not an operation of occupation outside the borders of the Hebrew state. However, concerning enemy bases lying directly close to the borders which may be used as springboards for infiltration into the territory of the state, these must be temporarily occupied and searched for hostiles according to the above guidelines, and they must then be incorporated into our defensive system until operations cease.

According to the Israeli chief of military intelligence Yehoshafat Harkabi, Plan Dalet called for the conquest of Arab towns and villages inside and along the borders of the area allocated to the proposed Jewish State in the UN Partition Plan.

According to David Tal,

The strategy called for the fortification and stabilization of a continuous Jewish-controlled line within the areas of the designated Jewish State and along its putative borders, and for the harassment of, and interference with, the Arab forces as they moved in. The success of this strategy depended on three elements: {'}cleansing{'} the area along the Jewish States's borders of an Arab presence; fortifying the Jewish settlements along the line of advance of the Arab column; and {'}hit-and-run{'} raids against the Arab troops as they advanced.

Ilan Pappé distinguishes between the general section of Plan Dalet and the operational orders given to the troops. According to Pappé the general section of the plan, which was distributed to politicians, was misguiding as to the real intentions of the Haganah. The real plan was handed down to the brigade commanders "not as vague guidelines, but as clear-cut operational orders for action". Along with the general section, "each brigade commander received a list of the villages or neighborhoods that had to be occupied, destroyed, and their inhabitants expelled".

=== Tactics ===
The plan section 3, under (b) Consolidation of Defense Systems and Fortifications calls for the occupation of police stations, the control of government installations, and the protection of secondary transportation arteries. Part 4 under this heading includes the following controversial paragraphs:

Mounting operations against enemy population centers located inside or near our defensive system in order to prevent them from being used as bases by an active armed force. These operations can be divided into the following categories:

Destruction of villages (setting fire to, blowing up, and planting mines in the debris), especially those population centers which are difficult to control continuously.
Mounting search and control operations according to the following guidelines: encirclement of the village and conducting a search inside it. In the event of resistance, the armed force must be destroyed and the population must be expelled outside the borders of the state.

The villages which are emptied in the manner described above must be included in the fixed defensive system and must be fortified as necessary.
In the absence of resistance, garrison troops will enter the village and take up positions in it or in locations which enable complete tactical control. The officer in command of the unit will confiscate all weapons, wireless devices, and motor vehicles in the village. In addition, he will detain all politically suspect individuals. After consultation with the [Jewish] political authorities, bodies will be appointed consisting of people from the village to administer the internal affairs of the village. In every region, a [Jewish] person will be appointed to be responsible for arranging the political and administrative affairs of all [Arab] villages and population centers which are occupied within that region.

The paragraph (g) Counterattacks Inside and Outside the Borders of the State inter alia states:

Counterattacks will generally proceed as follows: a force the size of a battalion, on average, will carry out a deep infiltration and will launch concentrated attacks against population centers and enemy bases with the aim of destroying them along with the enemy force positioned there.

== Implementation ==
Plan Dalet was first implemented in the first days of April, starting with Operation Nachshon. This marked the beginning of the second stage of the war in which, according to Benny Morris, the Haganah passed from the defensive to the offensive. Nachshon's objective was lifting the blockade on Jerusalem. Fifteen hundred men from Haganah's Givati brigade and Palmach's Harel brigade conducted sorties to free up the route to the city between April 5–20. The operation was successful, and enough foodstuffs to last 2 months were trucked into Jerusalem for distribution to the Jewish population.

The success of the operation was assisted by the death of Al-Hussayni in combat. From April 4–14, the first large-scale operation of the Arab Liberation Army ended in a debacle, having been roundly defeated at Mishmar HaEmek, coinciding with the loss of their Druze allies through defection.

On April 9, paramilitary groups Irgun and Lehi, supported by the Haganah and Palmach, (Note: Benny Morris "The Historiography of Deir Yassin" (2005), The Journal of Israeli History. "Haganah squads also provided covering fire and fired on the refugees fleeing southward, towards “Ein Karim. Two squads of the Palmah (the elite strike force of the Haganah) also arrived on the scene and helped evacuate the wounded and take some of the houses.") perpetrated the Deir Yassin massacre, killing at least 107 Arab villagers, including women and children. The event was widely publicized and had a deep effect on the Arab population's morale, greatly contributing to the Palestinian expulsion and flight. Israeli historian Ilan Pappé wrote in his book The Ethnic Cleansing of Palestine (2006) that "The systematic nature of Plan Dalet is manifested in Deir Yassin, a pastoral and cordial village that had reached a non-aggression pact with the Hagana in Jerusalem, but was doomed to be wiped out because it was within the areas designated in Plan Dalet to be cleansed." According to historian Benny Morris, Walid Khalidi also emphasized "the connection between the Haganah's "Plan Dalet" [...] and what happened in Deir Yassin, explicitly linking the expulsion of the inhabitants to the Haganah's overall planning."

As part of Plan Dalet, the Haganah, Palmach and Irgun captured the urban centers of Tiberias, Haifa (see Battle of Haifa), Safed, Beisan, Jaffa, and Acre, violently expelling more than 250,000 Palestinian Arabs.

The British had, at that time, essentially withdrawn their troops. The situation moved the leaders of the neighboring Arab states to intervene, but their preparations had not been finalised, and they could not assemble sufficient forces to turn the tide of the war. Many Palestinian hopes lay with the Arab Legion of Transjordan's monarch, King Abdullah I, but he had no intention of creating a Palestinian-run state, since he hoped to annex as much of the territory of the British Mandate of Palestine as he could.

The Haganah launched Operation Yiftah and Operation Ben-Ami to secure the Jewish settlements of Galilee, and Operation Kilshon, which created a united front around Jerusalem.

=== Operations ===
Operation	Start date	Objective	Location	Result
*Operation Nachshon	1 April	Carve out a corridor connecting Tel Aviv to Jerusalem; divide the main part of the UN-proposed Arab state in two	Territories allocated to future Arab State	Defeated
*Operation Harel	15 April	Continuation of Nachshon, focused on Arab villages near Latrun	Territories allocated to future Arab State	Defeated
Operation Bi'ur Hametz or Operation Misparayim	21 April	Capture Haifa and defeat its Arab population	Territories allocated to future Jewish State	Successful
*Operation Yevusi or Operation Jevussi	27 April	Destroy ring of Arab villages surrounding Jerusalem; control the roads from Jerusalem north to Ramallah, east to Jericho, and south to Bethlehem	Corpus separatum	Defeated
*Operation Hametz	27 April	Destroy Arab villages surrounding Jaffa	Territories allocated to future Arab State	Successful
Operation Yiftach	28 April	Remove Arabs and consolidate control of all the eastern Galilee	Territories allocated to future Jewish State	Successful
Operation Matateh	3 May	Destroy Arab villages and clear out Arab forces between Tiberias and eastern Galilee	Territories allocated to future Jewish State	Successful
*Operation Maccabi	7 May	Destroy Arab villages and clear out Arab forces near Latrun, penetrate Ramallah	Territories allocated to future Arab State	Defeated
Operation Gideon	11 May	Drive out Arab forces and semi-sedentary Bedouin communities and occupy the Beisan valley area	Territories allocated to future Jewish State	Successful
Operation Barak	12 May	Destroy Arab villages in Burayr on the way to the Negev	Territories allocated to future Jewish State	Partially successful
*Operation Ben'Ami	14 May	Occupy Acre and remove Arabs from western Galilee	Territories allocated to future Arab State	Successful
*Operation Kilshon or Operation Pitchfork	14 May	Clear out Arab forces and occupy Arab residential quarters in the New City of Jerusalem	Corpus separatum	Successful
*Operation Shfifon	14 May	Break the siege on the Jewish Quarter and occupy the Old City of Jerusalem	Corpus separatum	Defeated

The 8 of 13 operations marked with an asterisk (*) were executed outside territories allocated for a Jewish state according to the demarcations of the United Nations Partition Plan for Palestine and before the entry of Arab regular armies into areas allotted for an Arab state.

=== Outcome ===
By the end of the war, approximately 800,000 Palestinians were displaced in total, and hundreds of villages were destroyed.

== Historiography ==
In his article "The Fall of Haifa" in the December 1959 issue of the Middle East Forum, the Palestinian historian Walid Khalidi placed the Battle of Haifa within a new Zionist offensive and discernible shift in strategy, without naming the offensive. The scholarship of Khalidi and his colleagues at this time responded to the Israeli narrative that the Palestinian exodus was a result of evacuation orders from Arab leaders, then espoused in English most prominently by Jon Kimche and his younger brother David Kimche.

On May 21, 1961, the Irish journalist Erskine Childers published his article "The Other Exodus" in The Spectator, to which Jon Kimche responded immediately, accusing Childers of being influenced by Khalidi. Childers, Kimche, and Khalidi then argued publicly in a triangular debate in the pages of The Spectator until August 4, 1961. In November 1961, Khalidi published "Plan Dalet: Master Plan for the Conquest of Palestine" with details about the plan in the journal of the Middle East Forum. Khalidi wrote in 1988 that as of then the exchanges in The Spectator had never published in full in the US, and that there had not been a detailed account of Plan Dalet or previous plans in Israeli and non-Israeli writings on 1948.

=== Controversy about intent ===
The intent of Plan Dalet is subject to much controversy, with historians on the one extreme asserting that it was defensive, and historians on the other extreme asserting that the plan aimed at maximum conquest and expulsion.

According to the French historian Henry Laurens, the importance of the military dimension of plan Dalet becomes clear by comparing the operations of the Jordanian and the Egyptian armies. The ethnical homogeneity of the coastal area, obtained by the expulsions of the Palestinians eased the halt of the Egyptian advance, while Jewish Jerusalem, located in an Arab population area, was encircled by Jordanian forces.

According to The Oxford Handbook of Genocide Studies, whilst there may be controversy whether Plan Dalet was a centralized plan of ethnic cleansing, it could as well be a case of Haganah forces discovering that they could carry out ethnic cleansing at the local and regional level, as their offensive drove out large numbers of Arabs.

The plan was neither understood nor used by the senior field officers as a blanket instruction for the expulsion of the Palestinians. But, in providing for the expulsion or destruction of villages that had resisted or might threaten the Yishuv, it constituted a strategic-doctrinal and carte blanche for expulsions by front, brigade, district and battalion commanders (who in each case argued military necessity) and it gave commanders, post facto, formal, persuasive cover for their actions. However, during April–June, relatively few commanders faced the moral dilemma of having to carry out the expulsion clauses. Townspeople and villagers usually left their homes before or during battle, and Haganah rarely had to decide about, or issue, expulsion orders....".

In his book on the birth of the Palestinian refugee problem Israeli historian Benny Morris discusses the relevance of the idea of "population transfer" in Zionist thinking. Morris concludes that there was Zionist support for transfer "in the 1930s and early 1940s", and that while this "transfer thinking" had conditioned the Yishuv's hearts and minds to accept it as natural and inevitable when it happened, it "was not tantamount to pre-planning, and did not issue in the production of a policy or master plan of expulsion; the Yishuv and its military forces did not enter the 1948 War, which was initiated by the Arab side, with a policy or plan for expulsion".

On the intent of Plan Dalet Morris writes:

"To win the battle of the roads, the Haganah had to pacify the villages and towns that dominated them and served as bases of belligerency: Pacification meant the villages' surrender or depopulation and destruction. The essence of the plan was the clearing of hostile and potentially hostile forces out of the interior of the territory of the prospective Jewish State, establishing territorial continuity between the major concentrations of Jewish population and securing the future State's borders before, and in anticipation of, the invasion [by Arab states]. The Haganah regarded almost all the villages as actively or potentially hostile."

Benny Morris also wrote that "Nahshon heralded a shift from the defensive to the offensive and marked the beginning of the implementation of tochnit dalet (Plan D)" Morris also stated that:

"The Haganah shift of strategy was decided on incrementally during the first half of April: each decision appeared to be, and in large measure was, a response to a particular, local challenge. But by the end of the period it was clear that a dramatic conceptual change had taken place and that the Yishuv had gone over to the offensive and was now engaged in a war of conquest. That war of conquest was prefigured in Plan D."

Ilan Pappé writes that although "official Israeli historiography" considers the implementation of Plan Dalet to have been a shift from defence to offence, in reality Zionist forces had already been on the offense and conducting ethnic cleansing since December 1947. Pappé writes that "If there were a turning point in April, it was the shift from sporadic attacks and counter-attacks on the Palestinian civilian population towards the systematic mega-operation of ethnic cleansing that now followed."

Military historian David Tal writes, "the plan did provide the conditions for the destruction of Palestinian villages and the deportation of the dwellers; this was not the reason for the plan's composition", and that "its aim was to ensure full control over the territory assigned to the Jews by the partition resolution, thus placing the Haganah in the best possible strategic position to face an Arab invasion".

==== Historians asserting that the plan aimed at maximum conquest and expulsion ====
Walid Khalidi, General Secretary of the Institute for Palestine Studies, offered this interpretation in an address to the American Committee on Jerusalem:

"As is witnessed by the Haganah's Plan Dalet, the Jewish leadership was determined to link the envisaged Jewish state with the Jerusalem corpus separatum. But the corpus separatum lay deep in Arab territory, in the middle of the envisaged Palestinian state, so this linking up could only be done militarily."

Khalidi calls Plan Dalet a "master plan for the conquest of Palestine". He points to the Zionist ideas of transfer and of a Jewish state in all of Palestine, and to the offensive character of the military operations of the Zionists as the main proof of his interpretation.

Israeli historian Ilan Pappé asserts that Plan Dalet was a "blueprint for ethnic cleansing" which "spelled it out clearly and unambiguously: the Palestinians had to go ... The aim of the plan was in fact the destruction of both rural and urban areas of Palestine."

==== Historians asserting that the plan was defensive ====
Israeli historian Yoav Gelber considers that although it provided for counter-attacks, Plan Dalet was a defensive operation with the goals of (1) protection of the borders of the upcoming Jewish state according to the partition line; (2) securing its territorial continuity in the face of invasion attempts; (3) safeguarding freedom of movement on the roads and (4) enabling continuation of essential daily routines. Gelber rejects what he calls the "Palestinian-invented" version of Plan Dalet. Gelber says: "The text clarified unequivocally that expulsion concerned only those villages that would fight against the Hagana and resist occupation, and not all Arab hamlets".

== See also ==
- Towns and villages depopulated during the 1947–1949 Palestine war
- New Historians
- Allon Plan
