= Tabenkin (surname) =

Tabenkin is a Jewish surname.

- Yitzhak Tabenkin (1888-1971) Zionist activist and Israeli politician
- Joseph Tabenkin (1921-1987), Israeli military commander
- Ilya Tabenkin (1914-1988), Soviet artist

== See also ==
- Yitav
