= Saar Tzur =

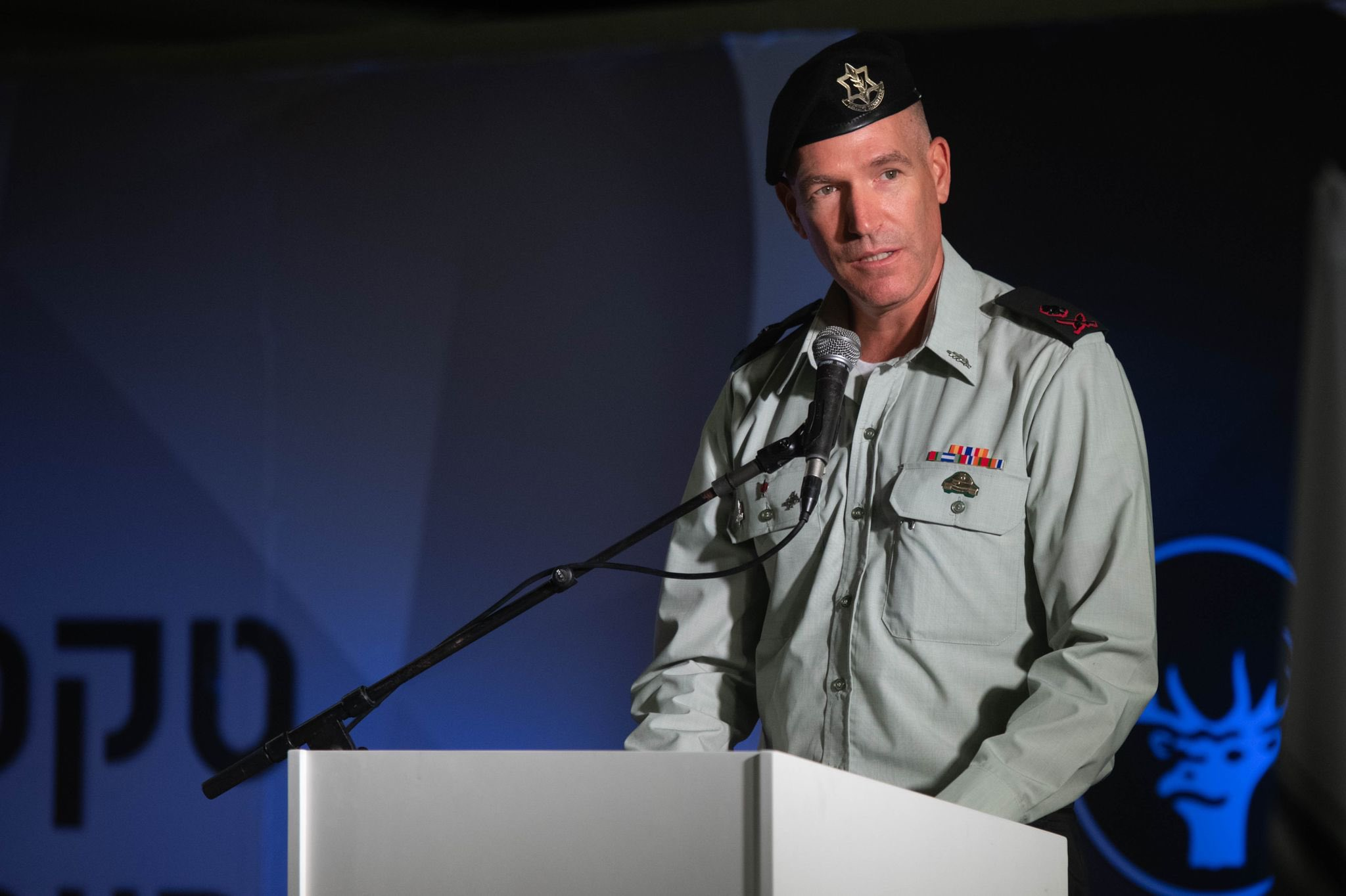
- Native name: סַעַר צוּר
- Born: 1973 (age 52–53); Israel
- Allegiance: Israel Defence Forces
- Service years: 1991–Onwards
- Rank: Major General (aluf)
- Conflicts: First Intifada; South Lebanon conflict (1985–2000); Operation Defensive Shield; 2006 Lebanon war; 2009 Gaza war; 2014 Gaza war; Gaza war

Aluf Saar Tzur (Hebrew: סַעַר צוּר; born 1973) is a senior officer and major general in the Israel Defense Forces, Commander of the Northern Corps and Head of Maneuver Array since November 2021. Sa’ar Tzur officially becomes commander of the Israel Defense Forces Northern Formation Commander on Nov. 22, 2021. He previously commanded the 162nd Division, the Sinai Division, head of the planning and organization department in the Israeli Ground Forces and commander of the 401st brigade.

== Biography ==
Tzur enlisted in 1991 and began his service in the 188th Armored Brigade. After passing the Officers course he went serving in the 401st Brigade. He had an instruction post in the Armored Corps and later as aid to Head of Northern Command. In 2002 he was made battalion commander in the rank of Lieutenant colonel and later served a number of command posts in the Judea and Samaria Division. By 2008 he commanded an armored brigade by the rank of colonel. He commander three brigades, including the 401st during Operation Protective Edge in the summer of 2014.

Tzur headed the planning and organization department in the Israeli Ground Forces between 2014 and 2016, later promoted to Brigadier general as commander of the Sinai Division. He served as commander of the National Center for Ground Training and by 2019 was appointed commander of the 162nd Division. He commanded the division in May 2021 during Operation Guardian of the Walls. In November 2021 Tzur was made Major general and appointed Commander of the Northern Corps and Head of Maneuver Array.
