= Operation Nachshon =

1948 Jewish operation in Mandatory Palestine

- Part of the 1947–1948 civil war in Mandatory Palestine and the Plan Dalet
- Telegraph dated 5 April 1948, confirming the beginning of Operation Nachshon that same night.
- Location: Tel Aviv – Jerusalem Road, Mandatory Palestine
- Date: 5–16 April 1948

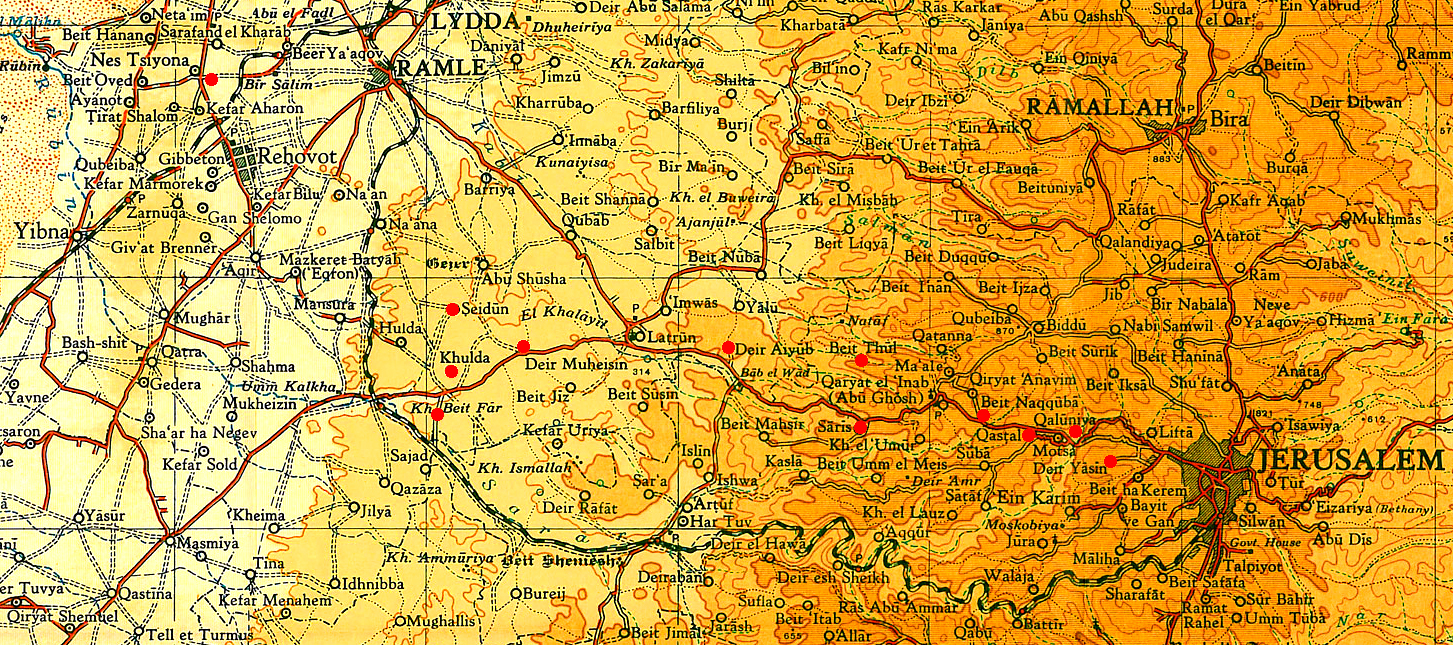
Villages captured during Operation Nachshon

Operation Nachshon (Hebrew: מבצע נחשון, Mivtza Nahshon; 5–16 April 1948) was a military operation of the Haganah during the 1947–1948 civil war in Mandatory Palestine and part of Plan Dalet. Its objective was to open the Tel Aviv – Jerusalem road blockaded by Palestinian Arabs, and furnish arms and supplies to the besieged Jewish community of Jerusalem. The operation was also known as "The operation to take control of the Jerusalem road," following which participating units later broke off to form the Harel Brigade. Following attempts to take control of the road to Jerusalem were unsuccessful and led to the construction of a makeshift bypass—Burma Road.

Nachshon was the first major Haganah operation and the first step of Plan Dalet. The Deir Yassin massacre was conducted as a part of the operation. (Note: Benny Morris, Righteous Victims - "The most important event during Operation Nahshon was probably the conquest by the IZL and LHI, assisted by the Haganah, of the village of Deir Yassin") Operation Nachshon was carried out by the Haganah's Givati and what was later to be known as the Harel Brigade of the Palmach.

== Background ==
On 29 November 1947, the United Nations Partition Plan for Palestine passed and the civil war in Mandatory Palestine began. By the end of March 1948, Abd al-Qadir al-Husayni's troops were preventing supply convoys from reaching Jerusalem. The city was besieged and the Jewish population was forced to adhere to a rationing system. On 31 March a 60 vehicle Jewish convoy was ambushed at Khulda and forced to turn back with the loss of five vehicles and 17 dead. Yishuv leader David Ben-Gurion decided to launch Nachshon in order to open up the city and provide supplies to the Jewish residents. Although initially intended as a one-shot affair, Nachshon later proved to be the first operation in the implementation of Plan Dalet.

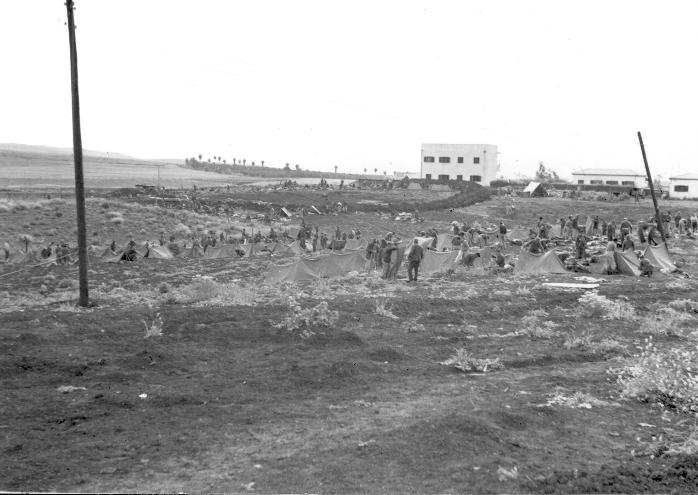
Members of the Harel Brigade assembling at Khulda at the beginning of Operation Nachshon

According to historian Ilan Pappé, "Operation Nachshon [...] was the first operation in which all the various Jewish military organisations endeavoured to act together as a single army – providing the basis for the future Israeli Defence Forces (IDF)."

== The operation ==
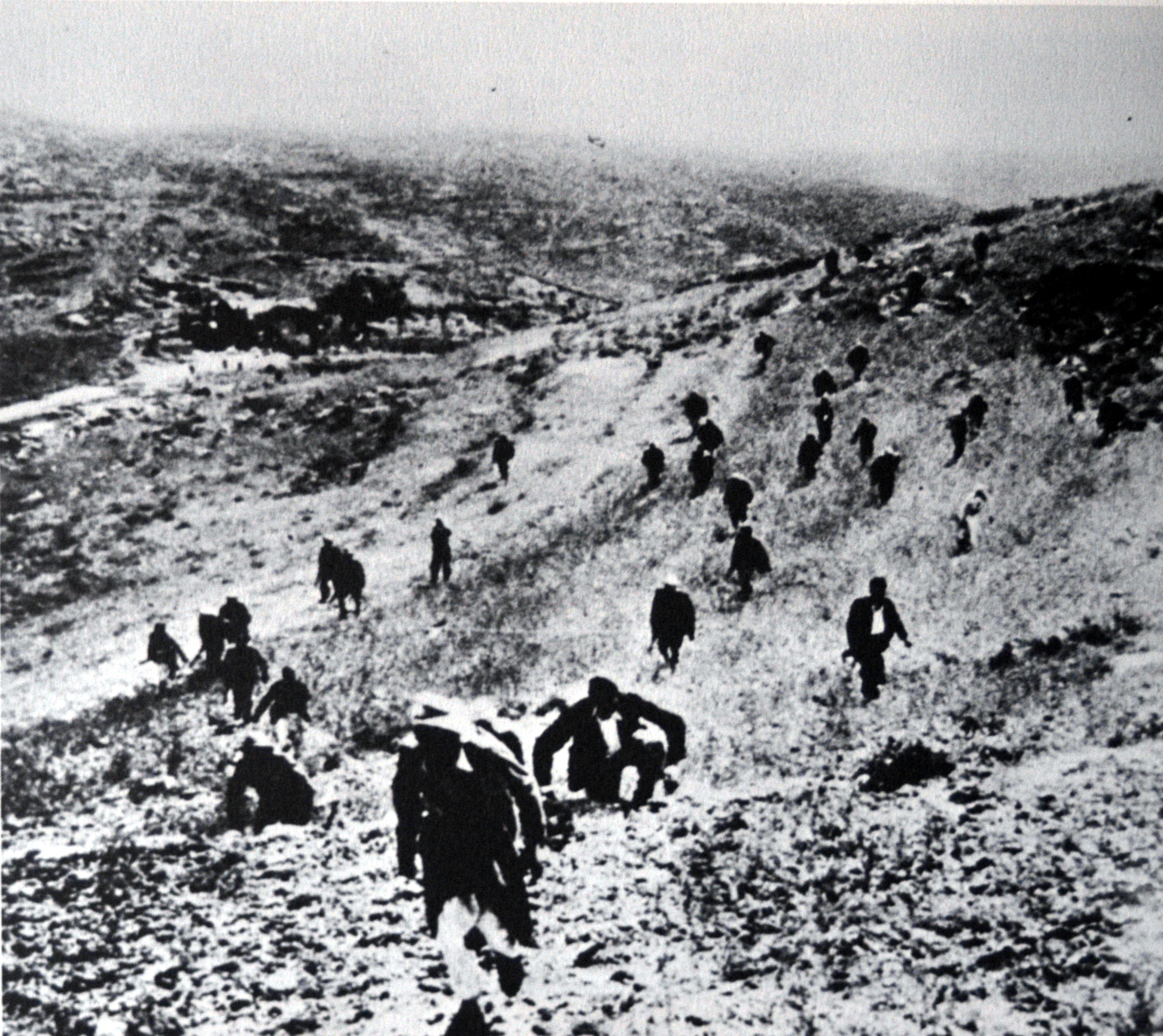
Palestinian irregulars, under the command of Abd al-Qadir al-Husayni, moving to counterattack Haganah positions in Al-Qastal, 7–8 April 1948

The operation was named after the Biblical figure Nachshon Ben Aminadav, who was the first to wade into the Red Sea when the Hebrews escaped from slavery in Egypt. The operation was commanded by Shimon Avidan.

The first orders were given on 2 April 1948. A telegraph confirming the beginning of the operation was released on 5 April, with the operation starting that same night. It lasted until 20 April. 1,500 men from the Givati and Harel brigades took control of the road to Jerusalem, allowing three of four convoys to get to the city.

The operation was a military success. All the Arab villages that blocked the route were either taken or destroyed, and the Jewish forces were victorious in all their engagements. Nonetheless, not all the objectives of the operation were achieved, as only 1,800 tonnes of the 3,000 envisaged were transported to the town, and two months of severe rationing had to be assumed.

Abd al-Qadir al-Husayni was killed during the night of 7–8 April, in the middle of the battles taking place in Al-Qastal. The loss of the charismatic Palestinian leader 'disrupted the Arab strategy and organisation in the area of Jerusalem.' His successor, Emil Ghuri, changed tactics: instead of provoking a series of ambushes throughout the route, he had a huge road block erected at Bab-el-Oued, and Jerusalem was once again isolated as a consequence.

During Operation Nachshon the Haganah wanted to attack the strategic village of Abu Gosh but this was opposed by the Stern Gang whose local commanders were on good terms with the mukhtar.

== Aftermath ==
Operation Nachshon exposed the poor military organisation of the Palestinian paramilitary groups. Due to lack of logistics, particularly food and ammunition, they were incapable of maintaining engagements that were more than a few hours away from their permanent bases.

Faced with these events, the Arab Higher Committee asked Alan Cunningham to allow the return of the Mufti, the only person capable of redressing the situation. Despite obtaining permission, the Mufti did not get to Jerusalem. His declining prestige cleared the way for the expansion of the influence of the Arab Liberation Army and of Fawzi al-Qawuqji in the Jerusalem area.

Between 15 and 20 April, three convoys, totalling over 700 lorries were able to reach Jewish Jerusalem. The Arabs, however, managed to block the road immediately thereafter. Operation Nachshon was therefore followed by Operation Harel, and immediately thereafter Operation Yevusi. Further operations in the Jerusalem region, Operation Maccabi and Operation Kilshon, took place in May.

== Palestinian communities captured during Operation Nachshon ==
Name	Population	Date	Defenders	Brigade	Notes
al-Qastal	90	3–9 April	Palestinian irregulars led by al-Qadir	Palmach	First target of the operation due to its commanding position over the road to Jerusalem. Taken on night of 3rd but the attackers retreated the next day. They briefly held the position on 8th and finally took complete control on 9th. All buildings including the mosque were demolished.
Dayr Muhaysin	460	6 April	n/a	n/a	Inhabitants ordered to leave and the village completely levelled. Palestinian irregulars launched several counterattacks and on 9 April the British army ordered the Jewish forces out because of the threat to British supply routes.
Khulda	280	6 April	no resistance	Haganah Battalion	The attackers were ordered to leave by the British army. Jewish forces bulldozed all the village buildings on 20 April.
Saydun	210	6 April	n/a	n/a	Villagers fled.
Dayr Yasin	610	9 April	villagers	Irgun, Lehi with Haganah assistance.	Around a sixth of inhabitants killed after village taken.
Qalunya	1,260 (including 350 Jews)	11 April	n/a	Palmach	Taken in a night-time attack. The villagers fled on hearing of killings in neighbouring Dayr Yasin. All buildings blown up on 10 & 11 April.
Bayt Naqquba	240	11 April	n/a	Palmach, Haganah	Depopulated and levelled shortly after capture. In 1962 the village of Ein Naqquba was recognised; its population consisted mainly of "internal refugees" from Bayt Naqquba.
Bayt Thul	260	after 11 April	n/a	n/a	Changed hands several times over following months, finally coming under Israeli control in July.
Saris	560	13 April	no opposition.	Haganah, force of 500 men.	Seven villagers, including women, killed in the attack, the rest were expelled. 25–35 buildings destroyed.
Khirbat Bayt Far	300	1st half of April	n/a	Haganah	May have been taken in subsequent operations at the end of April.
Dayr Ayyub	320	1st half of April	n/a	n/a	Scene of an ambush of a Jewish convoy to Jerusalem on 17 April. Village depopulated and changed hands several times over the summer.
Wadi Hunayn	3,380 including 1,760 Jews	17 April	n/a	Givati Brigade	May have been taken and depopulated a few weeks later.
Bab el-Wad		11–17 April	n/a	n/a	Several buildings marking beginning of valley leading to Jerusalem. Briefly held on 11th, finally captured on 17th.

Sources:

- Walid Khalidi, All That Remains, ISBN 0-88728-224-5.
- Benny Morris, The Birth of the Palestinian refugee problem, 1947–1949, ISBN 0-521-33028-9.

== See also ==
- 1948 Arab–Israeli War
- Burma Road (Israel)
- Depopulated Palestinian locations in Israel
