= Joseph Tabenkin =

Israeli military commander

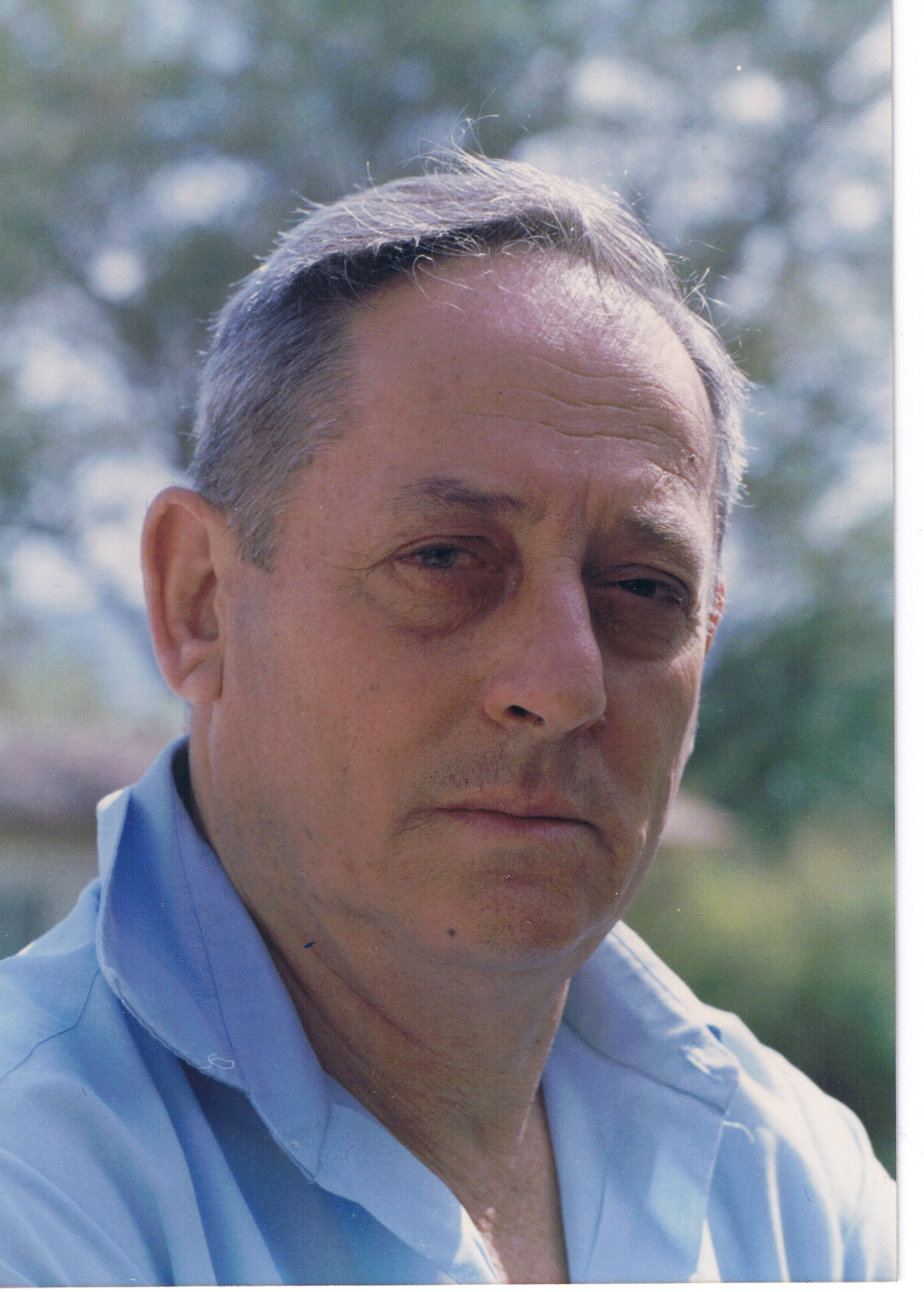
- Native name: יוסף טבנקין
- Born: 18 March 1921; Tel Aviv, Mandatory Palestine
- Died: 24 September 1987 (Aged 66) Ein Harod, Israel
- Buried: Kibbutz Ein Harod, Israel
- Allegiance: Palmach, Israel

Joseph "Yosefle" Tabenkin (Hebrew: יוסף טבנקין; March 18, 1921 – September 24, 1987) was an Israeli commander of the Fourth Battalion of the Palmach's Harel Brigade in the years leading up to and during the 1948 Palestine war, also known as Israel's "War of Independence."

== Biography ==
Joseph Tabenkin was born in Tel Aviv to Russian Jewish immigrant parents, the son of politician Yitzhak Tabenkin, and one of the founders of the Kibbutz haArtzi. In 1946, Joseph Tabenkin married Ya'el Tamarin, who, like him, had joined the Palmach.

== Military career ==
In 1938, at the age of seventeen, Tabenkin joined the Field Squadron of the Haganah, an underground paramilitary organization operating in Mandatory Palestine. In 1942, he enlisted in the Palmach, an elite unit of that organization, where he soon made a career as an instructor, until in 1947, during a time of disturbances in Mandate Palestine, he was promoted to commander of the Palmach's Platoon Dalet, where he served under Yigael Yadin. In December 1947, Tabenkin participated in retaliatory raids on Arab targets in Ramla for the murders of Jews committed by the Arabs. After the Haifa Oil Refinery massacre in late December 1947, Tabenkin personally took charge of the Haifa port by sending 25 of his men from the Palmach to the harbour in order to restore law and order.

During the outbreak of war in 1948, he saw military action in Operation Nachshon where he served with the Second Battalion known as Ha-portzim, thence in Operation Harel (when the unit then took on the name Fourth Battalion of the Harel Brigade) and, later, took part in operations known as Operation Danny. Afterwards, with renewed fighting in the fall, Tabenkin led operations in Operation Ha-Har, when he had already replaced Yitzhak Rabin as the commander of the Harel Brigade. In this final operation, he led his combatants to military victories, who, at that time, had gained the mastery of the field. He was commander when, under directions from Moshe Dayan, a military unit specializing in biological warfare, contaminated the wells of Biddu and Beit Surik with diphtheria and typhus bacteria to prevent the dispossessed Palestinians in those localities from re-establishing themselves in their homes.

Operation Nachshon's mission was to break the siege of Jerusalem by opening the Tel-Aviv – Jerusalem, the road which was blockaded by the local Arabs and to supply food and weapons to the isolated Jewish community of Jerusalem. According to Tabenkin, two days before the end of Operation Nachshon (on 14 April 1948), the military echelon had decided to capture and destroy all Arab villages along the Tel-Aviv - Jerusalem highway which had been used as a base of operations to intercept Jewish convoys. In contrast, Operation Ha-Har was to open-up the Jerusalem Corridor south of Nahal Sorek, and to rid the area of all pockets of resistance. As Harel Brigade commander, Tabenkin was subordinate to OC Central Command, General Zvi Ayalon, who, in turn, answered to David Ben-Gurion.

In May 1948, the Harel Brigade was involved in Operation Maccabi. With only a break-away "diversionary force" of 120 men, Tabenkin had delegated the duty of capturing Mount Zion to his deputy, Uzi Narkiss, while he himself went to Operations Central Command headquarters to ask for reinforcements to secure the area once it had been captured. The delay of reinforcements forced the Brigade to retreat from Jerusalem.

Tabenkin accredited himself with having designed the first armored car in the War of Independence. According to Tabenkin, he brought 4,500 Jewish fighters from Cyprus, and also organized the first Jewish pilots for combat operations.

In 1950, Tabenkin retired from the IDF at the rank of lieutenant colonel.

== Post war ==
After the war, Tabenkin studied industrial engineering at Technion University, where he earned a Bachelor's degree in 1961. After the Six Day War, Tabenkin became actively involved in the Movement for Greater Israel, of which his father was one of its founders, and is one of 57 signatories to the "Greater Land of Israel" declaration, signed on 22 September 1967. In his native Ein Harod (Meuhad) he operated a steel factory, dealt in exports, and later operated a plywood factory in Petach Tikvah.

== Published works ==
- Yitzhak Tabenkin and the Challenges of his Time, Hadar: Tel-Aviv 1986
- The Turning Point in the War of Independence, Tabenkin Memorial: Ramat Ef'al 1989 (published post-mortem)
