= Katamon Medal =

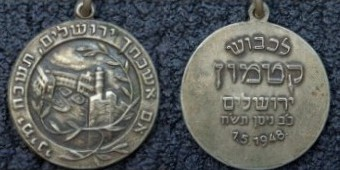
- Obverse (left) and reverse (right)
- Type: Campaign medal
- Awarded for: participating in the battle for the conquest of the Katamon neighbourhood of Jerusalem.
- Country: Israel
- Presented by: Israel Defense Forces
- Eligibility: Palmach soldiers who participated in the Battle of Katamon
- Campaign: Operation Yevusi
- Status: No longer awarded or recognised
- Established: May 1948
- First award: July 1949
- Final award: 1949
- Ribbon

Katamon Medal (Hebrew: אות קטמון) (also Qatamon Medal) was an Israeli military decoration awarded during the 1947–1949 Palestine war for participation in the Battle of Katamon, part of Operation Yevusi.

== History ==
The Katamon Medal was instituted in May 1948 as a decoration to IDF soldiers who took part in the battle for the conquest of the Katamon neighborhood of Jerusalem, part of Operation Yevusi.

Awarding of the Katamon Medal began in July 1949, however soon after the awarding of the medal the IDF withdrew its recognition and wearing of the medal has stopped.

The Katamon Medal is a disk, 28 millimetres (1.10 inches) in diameter. The ribbon is attached to a loupe hole on the top of the medal. versions in both silver and bronze exist.

Obverse

The obverse shows in the centre the Tower of David and the Jewish Agency; around in Hebrew is writing from a Psalms verse (137:5) "אם אשכחך ירושלים, תשכח ימיני" (Hebrew for If I forget thee O Jerusalem let my right hand be forgotten), which had also been used as the pledge of Lehi.

Reverse

The reverse reads "לכיבוש קטמון ירושלים כ"ב ניסן תש"ח" (Hebrew for for the conquest of Qatamon Jerusalem 22 Nissan 5708) and in English "1.5.1948"

Ribbon

The ribbon is equal parts blue and white.
