= Saris, Jerusalem =

Saris ساريس
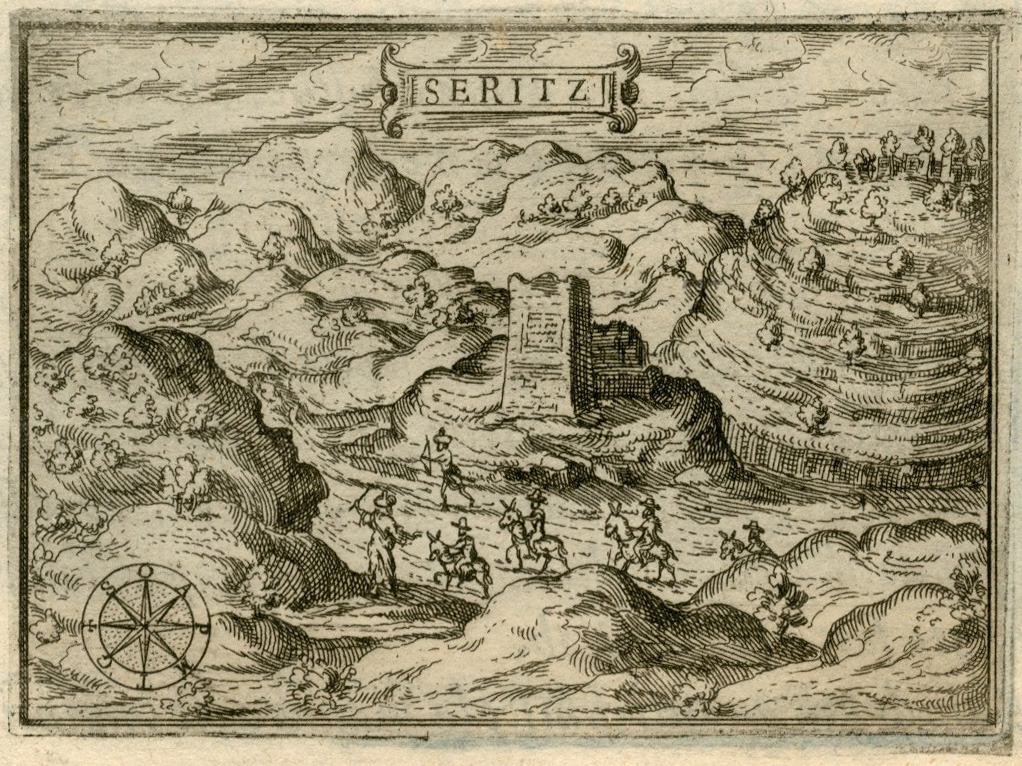
- Landscape near Saris, on a 1587 print by Jean Zuallart
- Etymology: Saris, personal name
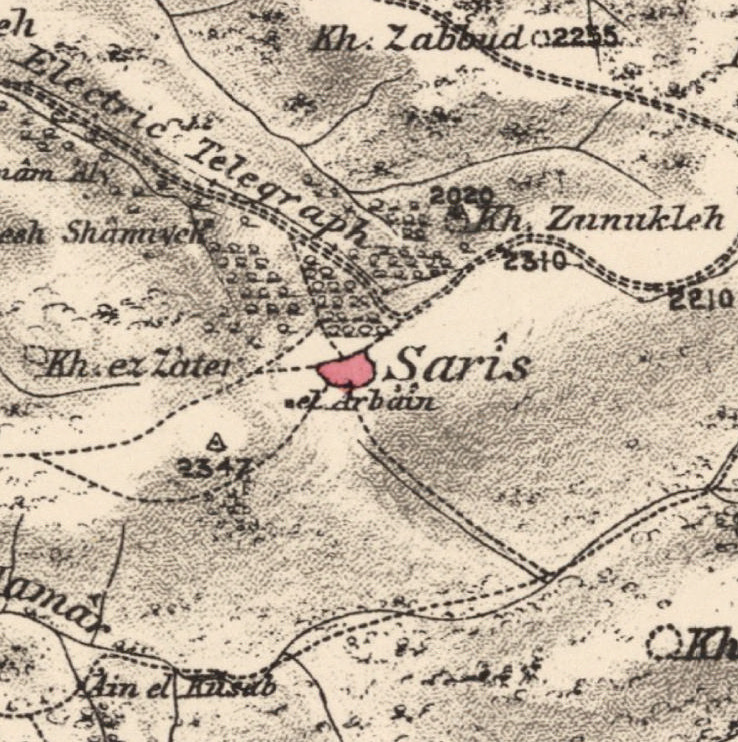
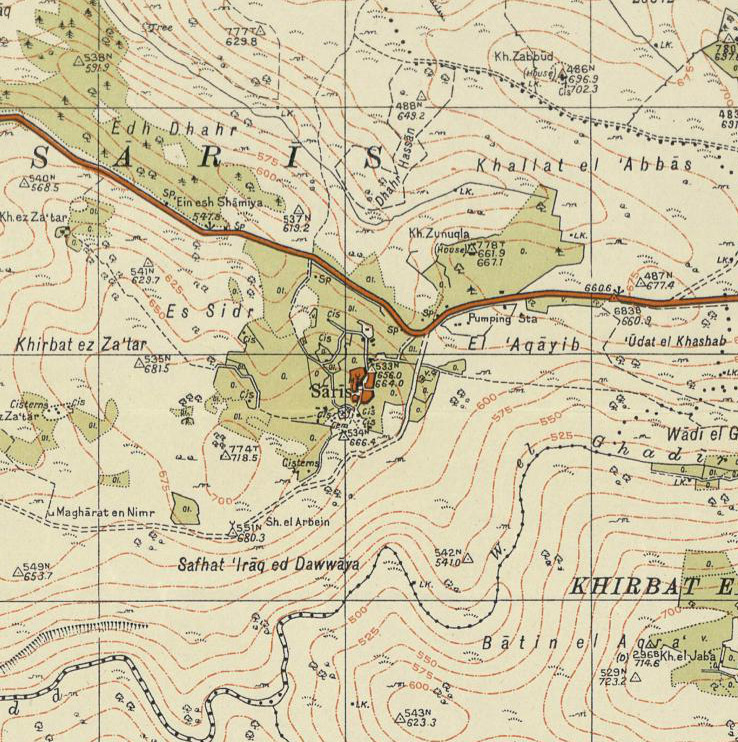
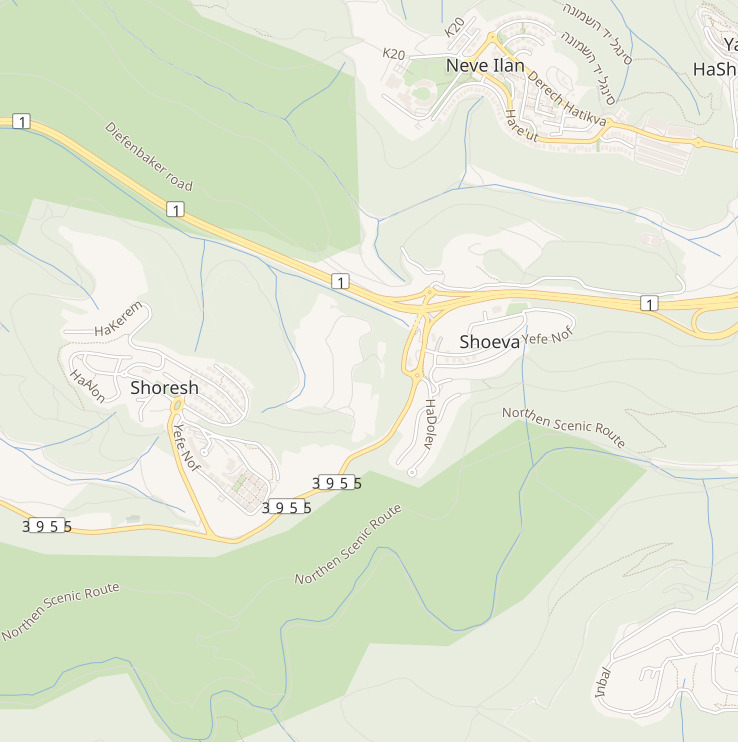
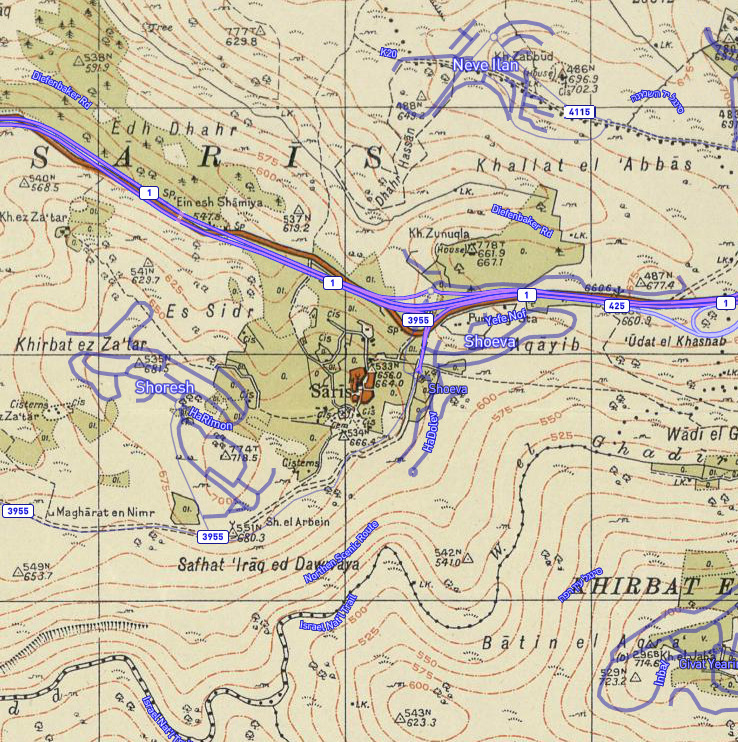
- 1870s map 1940s map modern map 1940s with modern overlay map A series of historical maps of the area around Saris, Jerusalem (click the buttons)

- Location within Mandatory Palestine
- Coordinates: 31°47′53″N 35°04′26″E
- Palestine grid: 157/133
- Geopolitical entity: Mandatory Palestine
- Subdistrict: Jerusalem
- Date of depopulation: 16–17 April 1948

Area
  - Total: 10,699 dunams (10.699 km^{2}; 4.131 sq mi)

Population (1945)
  - Total: 560
- Cause(s) of depopulation: Military assault by Yishuv forces
- Current Localities: Shoresh, Sho'eva, Neve Ilan

Saris (Arabic: ساريس) was a Palestinian Arab village that was depopulated during the major offensive launched by the Haganah on 16 April 1948. Called Operation Nachshon, and launched before the British had left Palestine, its objective was to capture villages between Jerusalem and the coastal plain, in order to break the siege of the Jews of Jerusalem.

== History ==
Yaqut al-Hamawi noted about Saris in the 1220s that it was "a village of the district round Jerusalem. It lies half-way between Jerusalem and Ar Ramlah, and 4 hours from either place".

=== Ottoman era ===
During Ottoman rule in Palestine, in 1596, Saris was a village in the nahiya (subdistrict) of Jerusalem under the liwa' (district) of Jerusalem and it had a population of 53 Muslim households, an estimated 292 persons. The villagers paid taxes on a number of crops, including wheat, barley, olives fruit and carob, as well as on goats, beehives and vineyards; a total of 7,098 akçe. A quarter of the revenue went to a Waqf.

In 1838, Edward Robinson noted Saris as a Muslim village in the District of Beni Malik, west of Jerusalem, while in 1852 he noted that the village "belonged feudally" to the Latham family, of Bayt 'Itab.

In 1863, the French explorer Victor Guérin found Saris to have an apparently ancient water well, while the houses looked "dilapidated". An Ottoman village list of about 1870 counted 57 houses and a population of 169, though the population count included men, only.

In 1883, the PEF's Survey of Western Palestine described Saris as being located on top of a hill, with olive trees growing below the village.

Baldensperger reported in 1893 that the Seal of Solomon was engraved in stone over windows and doors on several houses in Saris. According to Palestinian folklore, this kept away all evil. In 1896 the population of Saris was estimated to be about 360 persons.

=== British Mandate era ===
In the 1922 census of Palestine conducted by the British Mandate authorities, Saris had a population 373, all Muslims, increasing in the 1931 census to 470, still all Muslims, in 114 houses. A 1931 survey counted 114 houses in the village.

In the 1945 statistics the population of Saris was 560, all Muslims, and it had 10,699 dunams of land according to an official land and population survey. 366 dunams were plantations and irrigable land, 3,677 for cereals, while 10 dunams were built-up (urban) land.

=== 1948 war and destruction ===
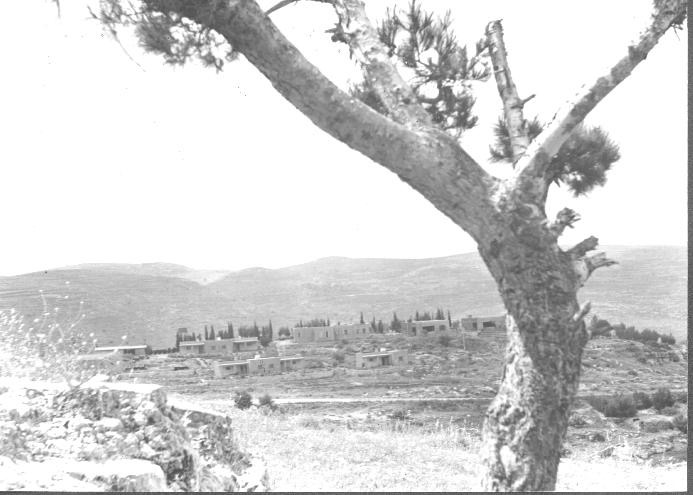
Saris, Palestine. 1948

On 13 April, before the village was attacked, Israel Galili wrote to Yosef Weitz of the JNF asking for a settlement to be established at Saris 'as soon as possible.'

On 16-17 April 1948 the village was attacked by the Haganah. The Scotsman reported 'Jews destroyed a mosque, village school, and 25 houses, killing three women in an attack on the Arab village of Saris early today (16th). There were about 500 attackers.' The New York Times carried the same report and gave the number of Arab dead as seven. A Haganah statement is quoted as saying that the battalion stayed in the village for about five hours, blowing up 25 buildings and burning others. Historian Saleh Abdel Jawad writes that "indiscriminate killings" occurred.

Following the war, the area was incorporated into the State of Israel. The village of Shoresh was established 1 km south west of the remains of Saris in 1948, while Sho'eva was set up 0.5 km north east of the site in 1950, both on land that had belonged to Saris.

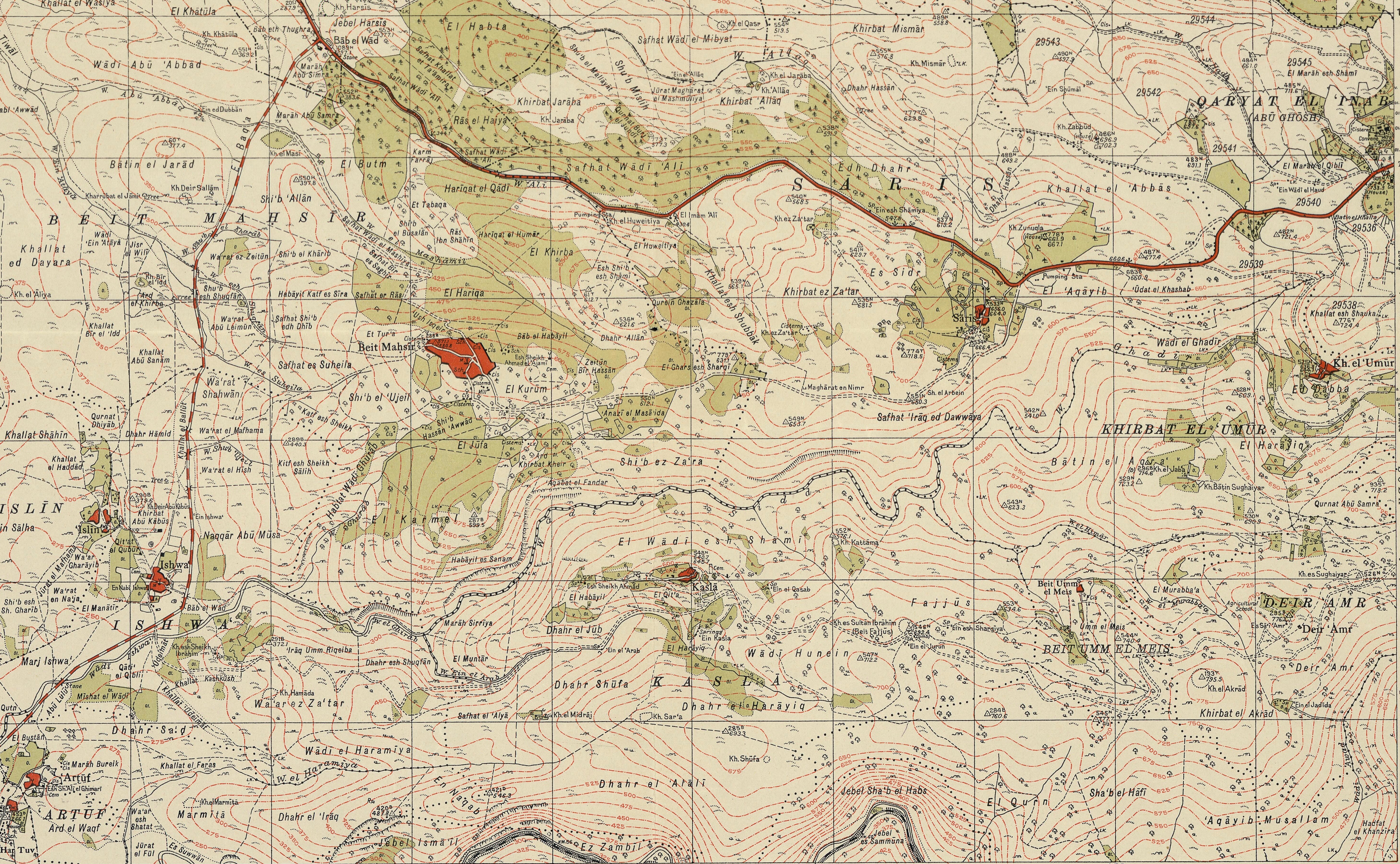
Saris 1943 1:20,000 (top right quadrant)

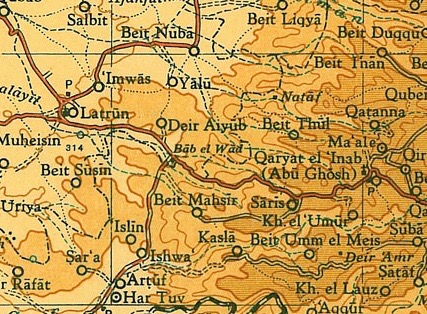
Saris 1945 1:250,000 (lower right quadrant)

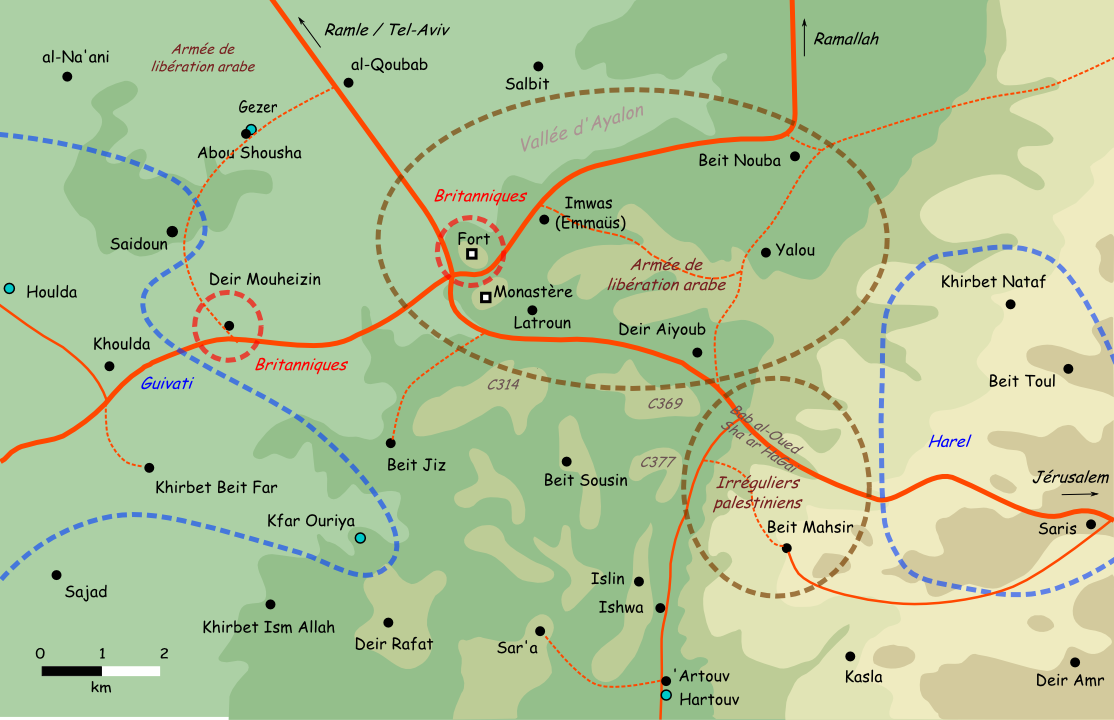
Saris 10 May 1948 (lower right)

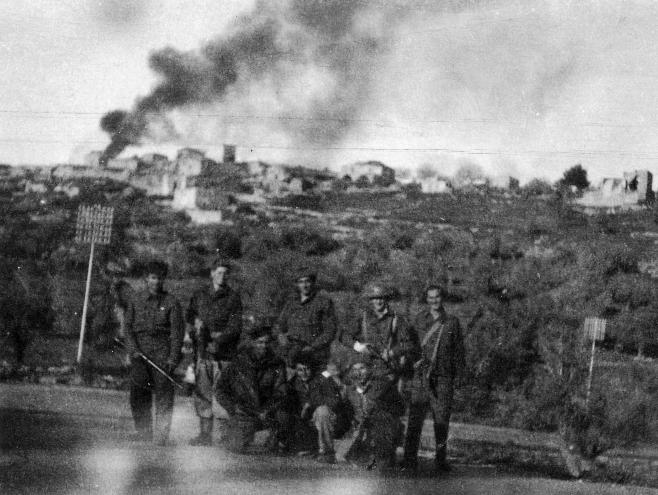
Members of Harel Brigade demolishing houses in Saris, 1948

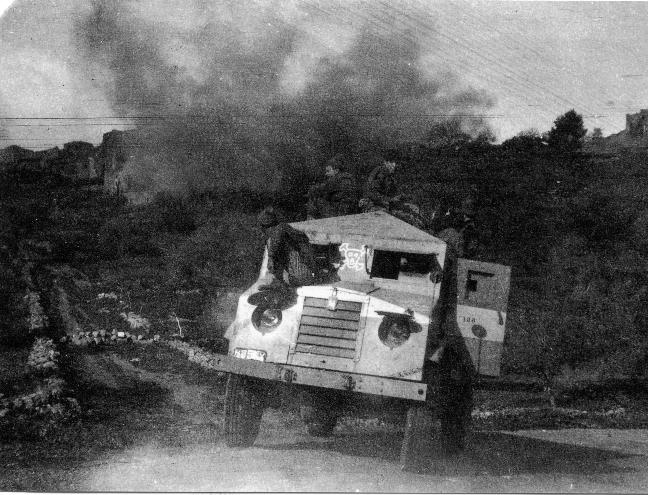
Harel Brigade demolishing houses in Saris, 1948

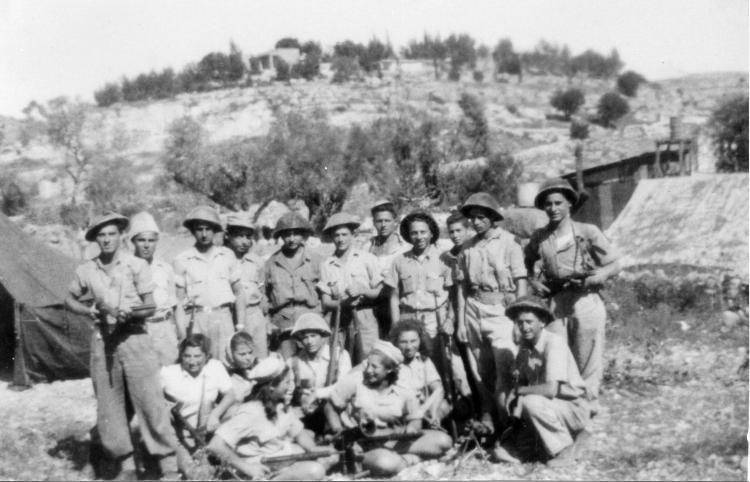
Members of the Harel Brigade training outside Saris, 1948

The Palestinian historian Walid Khalidi described the village land in 1992: "The site is covered with stone rubble; iron bars protrude from the collapsed roofs. There are many open wells and several caves with arched roofs. A large number of trees, including cypress, fig, and almond trees, grow on the site. An abandoned grove of almond trees is located on the eastern side. In the middle of the slope are the remains of an artificial pool. The village cemetery, surrounded by trees, is located southwest of the site. It contains several large tombs, one of which is surrounded by a small, roofless enclosure; an almond tree grows in the center." He also noted that two forests had been established in the area by the Jewish National Fund and the Center for European Jewry.

== Bibliography ==
- Baldensperger, Philip J. (1 July 1893). "Peasant Folklore of Palestine". Palestine Exploration Quarterly. 25 (3): 203-219.
- Barron, J.B., ed. (1923). Palestine: Report and General Abstracts of the Census of 1922. Government of Palestine.
- Conder, C.R.; Kitchener, H.H. (1883). The Survey of Western Palestine: Memoirs of the Topography, Orography, Hydrography, and Archaeology. Vol. 3. London: Committee of the Palestine Exploration Fund.
- Department of Statistics (1945). Village Statistics, April, 1945. Government of Palestine.
- Guérin, V. (1868). Description Géographique Historique et Archéologique de la Palestine (in French). Vol. 1: Judee, pt. 1. Paris: L'Imprimerie Nationale.
- Hadawi, S. (1970). Village Statistics of 1945: A Classification of Land and Area ownership in Palestine. Palestine Liberation Organization Research Center.
- Hartmann, M. (1883). "Die Ortschaftenliste des Liwa Jerusalem in dem türkischen Staatskalender für Syrien auf das Jahr 1288 der Flucht (1871)". Zeitschrift des Deutschen Palästina-Vereins. 6: 102–149.
- Hütteroth, W.-D.; Abdulfattah, K. (1977). Historical Geography of Palestine, Transjordan and Southern Syria in the Late 16th Century. Erlanger Geographische Arbeiten, Sonderband 5. Erlangen, Germany: Vorstand der Fränkischen Geographischen Gesellschaft. ISBN 3-920405-41-2.
- Khalidi, W. (1992). All That Remains: The Palestinian Villages Occupied and Depopulated by Israel in 1948. Washington D.C.: Institute for Palestine Studies. ISBN 0-88728-224-5.
- Le Strange, G. (1890). Palestine Under the Moslems: A Description of Syria and the Holy Land from A.D. 650 to 1500. Committee of the Palestine Exploration Fund.
- Mills, E., ed. (1932). Census of Palestine 1931. Population of Villages, Towns and Administrative Areas. Jerusalem: Government of Palestine.
- Morris, B. (2004). The Birth of the Palestinian Refugee Problem Revisited. Cambridge University Press. ISBN 978-0-521-00967-6.
- Palmer, E.H. (1881). The Survey of Western Palestine: Arabic and English Name Lists Collected During the Survey by Lieutenants Conder and Kitchener, R. E. Transliterated and Explained by E.H. Palmer. Committee of the Palestine Exploration Fund.
- Robinson, E.; Smith, E. (1841). Biblical Researches in Palestine, Mount Sinai and Arabia Petraea: A Journal of Travels in the year 1838. Vol. 2. Boston: Crocker & Brewster. (pp. 337, 339–340)
- Robinson, E.; Smith, E. (1841). Biblical Researches in Palestine, Mount Sinai and Arabia Petraea: A Journal of Travels in the year 1838. Vol. 3. Boston: Crocker & Brewster.
- Robinson, E.; Smith, E. (1856). Later Biblical Researches in Palestine and adjacent regions: A Journal of Travels in the year 1852. London: John Murray.
- Schick, C. (1896). "Zur Einwohnerzahl des Bezirks Jerusalem". Zeitschrift des Deutschen Palästina-Vereins. 19: 120–127.
- Socin, A. (1879). "Alphabetisches Verzeichniss von Ortschaften des Paschalik Jerusalem". Zeitschrift des Deutschen Palästina-Vereins. 2: 135–163.
- Zuallart, J. [in French] (1587). Il devotissimo viaggio di Gervsalemme. Roma.
