= Battle of Beit Hanoun =

2023 military engagement in the Gaza Strip

- Part of the Israeli invasion of the Gaza Strip and the insurgency in the North Gaza Strip during the Gaza war
Date	27 October 2023 – 31 May 2024 (7 months and 4 days)
Location	Beit Hanoun, Gaza Strip
Territorial changes	Hamas government and Palestinian militants retain control of Beit Hanoun

Belligerents
Israel	(Palestine) Palestinian Joint Operations Room; Hamas; Palestinian Islamic Jihad; (Fatah) Al-Aqsa Martyrs' Brigades

Units involved
(Israel) 252nd Division; (Israel) Harel Brigade; Israel Air Force	(Hamas) Beit Hanoun Battalion; (Palestinian Islamic Jihad) Al Quds Brigades; Al-Aqsa Martyrs' Brigades

Casualties and losses
60+ soldiers killed or wounded; 1 Namer APC destroyed; 4 Merkava tanks	

The battle of Beit Hanoun began on 27 October 2023 at the start of the Israeli invasion of the Gaza Strip. On 18 December 2023, Israeli forces had prematurely signalled that they had full control over Beit Hanoun and had destroyed Hamas' Beit Hanoun Battalion. However, clashes continued in the town. Israeli forces withdrew from the town on 24 December. Subsequently, some Palestinian militants infiltrated back into the town and conducted attacks against Israeli forces to the east.

== Battles ==
On 27 October, Hamas stated that its military wing was confronting the Israel Defense Forces (IDF) in Beit Hanoun in northern Gaza, with "violent engagements" taking place. Pro-Palestinian sources stated that the IDF had carried out "a very limited incursion" into the outskirts of Beit Hanoun overnight. On the same day, Hamas said that they had "foiled an Israeli ground incursion into Beit Hanoun."

On 31 October, Israeli forces claimed to have advanced into the outskirts of Beit Hanoun to conduct clearing operations, in an attempt to besiege Gaza City.

On 1 November, Hamas said it had destroyed several Israeli tanks and armored vehicles, including at least four Israeli Merkava tanks using Yasin 105 anti-tank rocket-propelled grenades in Beit Hanoun. The Al-Qassam Brigades also claimed to have bombed a gathering of IDF soldiers near Beit Hanoun using a quadcopter drone. On the following day, pro-Palestinian sources reported that Israeli forces were advancing from the east and south as part of an effort to encircle and advance into Beit Hanoun.

On 4 November, the IDF continued its advance in Beit Hanoun. Clashes occurred on al-Karameh street, the city's main north–south street. The al-Qassam Brigades published footage of its militants maneuvering through tunnel systems in Beit Hanoun and attacking Israeli forces with various weapons.

On 11 November, the IDF announced that four Israeli soldiers were killed in a booby-trapped tunnel in Beit Hanoun, while another was killed in battles in the north. The IDF claimed to have advanced beyond the city on or before 12 November, and it released a video showing the IDF Harel Brigade operating south of Beit Hanoun. Hamas fighters are continuing to attack the IDF in Beit Hanoun beyond the IDF's forward line of advance. The Al-Qassam Brigades said that it detonated an anti-personnel improvised explosive device (IED) targeting IDF forces sheltering in a house in Beit Hanoun.

On 9 November, the destruction had become so extensive and severe that Beit Hanoun was described as "not only dead, but no longer existing".

On 15 November, Hamas announced that, it destroyed four Israeli vehicles with Yasin 105 rocket-propelled grenades in Beit Hanoun.

On 18 December 2023, the IDF claimed to have taken full control over Beit Hanoun and destroyed Hamas' Beit Hanoun Battalion.

By 20 December, Israel shifted to holding operations within the area, while Hamas continued to launch attacks on Israeli forces with small arms, including drive-by attacks.

On 24 December, Israeli forces withdrew from Beit Hanoun amidst heavy fighting with Palestinian militant groups. Returning civilians to the town's ruins reported that no vehicles were in sight. Israeli forces continue to shell the city.

Former residents of Beit Hanoun returned to the remains of the town after Israeli forces had withdrawn from it. The destruction had encompassed the entire city, and residents said that "all structures were destroyed", and described most of Beit Hanoun as being "razed to the ground".

On 26 December, Hamas attacked Israeli forces carrying out holding operations with an improvised explosive device.

On 15 January 2024, the Al Quds Brigades fired a rocket salvo from Beit Hanoun toward southern Israel, as Palestinian militants began infiltrating areas which had been previously cleared by the IDF in Northern Gaza.

On 9 March, IDF Kfir Brigade's Netzah Yuhda Battalion (143rd Division) operated in Beit Hanoun targeting Palestinian fighters that had returned since IDF's previous withdrawal.

On 4 April, IDF 7643rd Gefen Brigade (Gaza Division) and Netzah Yehuda Battalion (900th Kfir Brigade, 99th Reserve Division) continued re-clearing of Beit Hanoun and announced the death of a Hamas company commander.

On 31 May, the IDF withdrew from Beit Hanoun and all areas in northern Gaza following the end of the Battle of Jabalia.

On 8 July 2025, the Israeli military had surrounded the Beit Hanoun area "from all directions," with forces of the Netzah Yehuda Battalion and the 646th Reserve Paratroopers Brigade, and was attempting to exert full control over the area that they had failed to capture during prior clashes in the city. This followed an Hamas attack on IDF forces on 7 July where five IDF soldiers were killed and 14 were wounded.

== Analysis ==
By December 2023, Israeli media had reported that secured operational control over Beit Hanoun. However, this view was challenged by analysts such as Salih Adai and Sally Hussain at the University of Babylon who argued that these statements by Israeli media were contradicted by continuous militant activity and operational control in Beit Hanoun well into 2024.

== See also ==
- List of military engagements during the Gaza war
