= Dayr Ayyub =

Dayr Ayyub دير أيوب
- Etymology: the monastery of Job
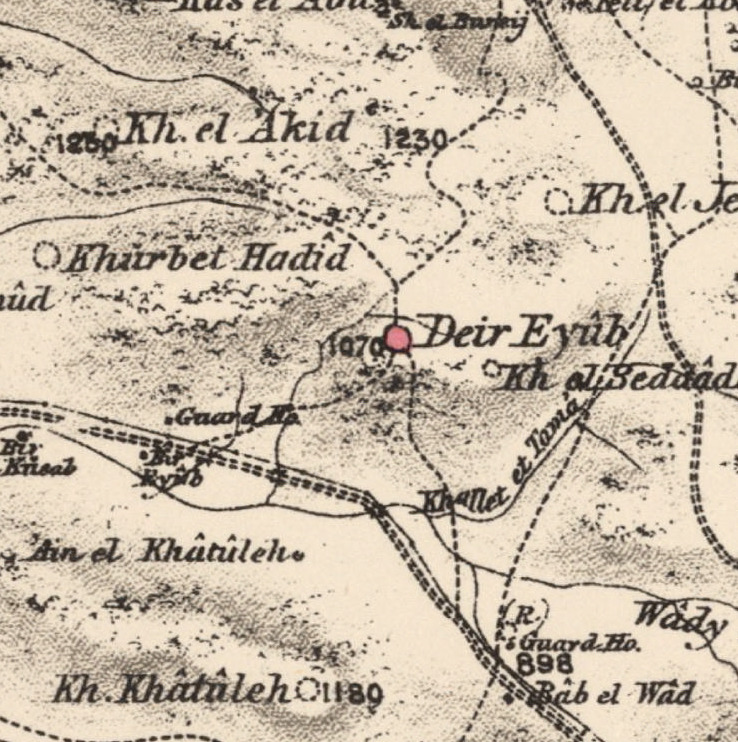
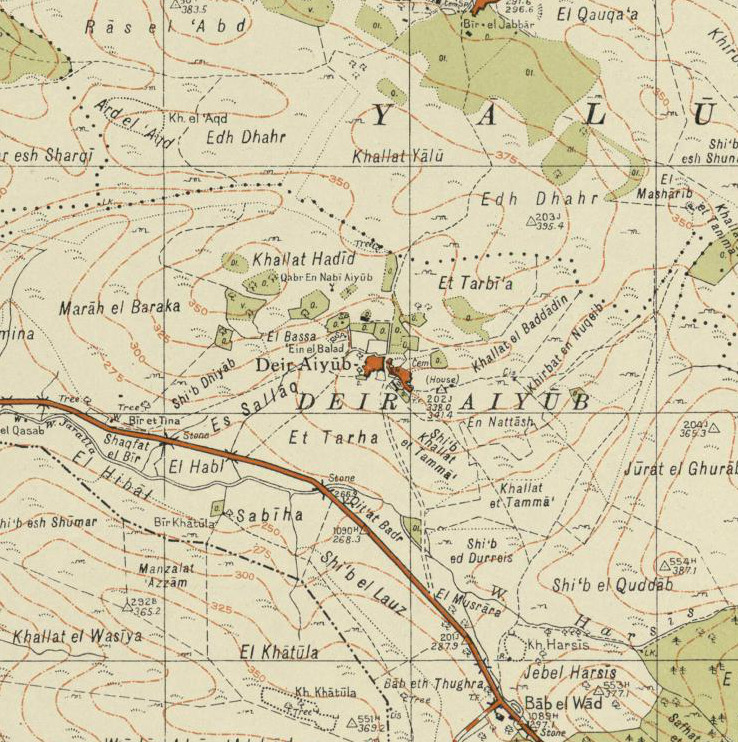
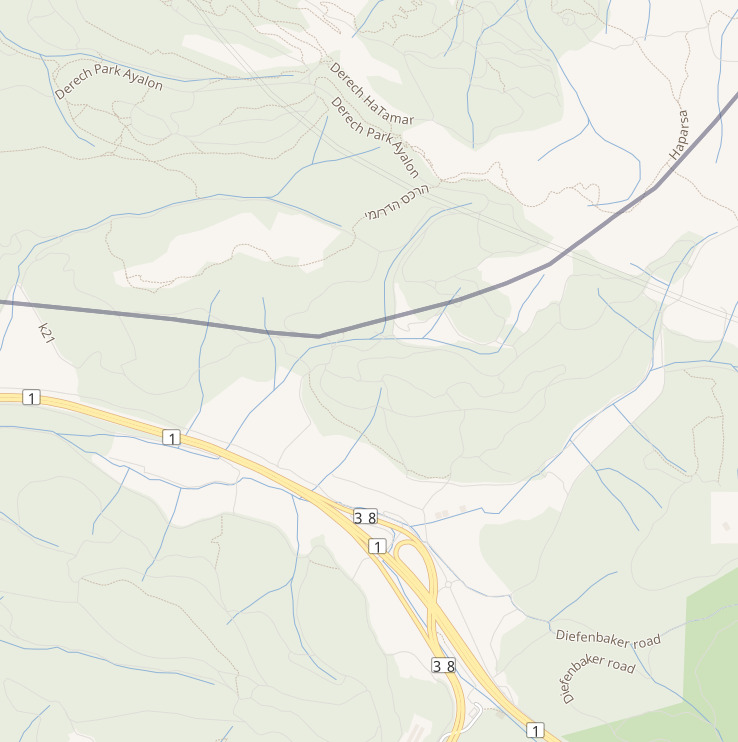
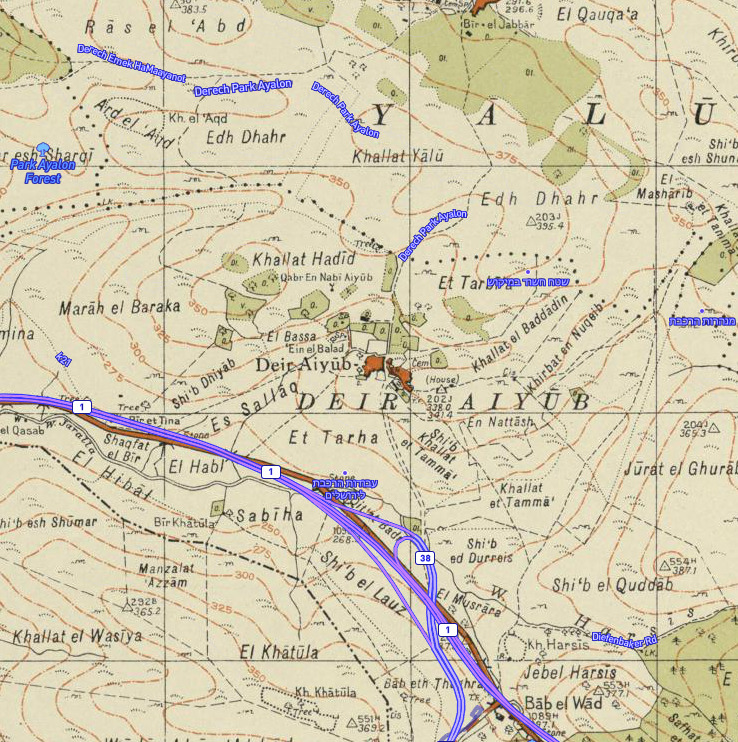
- 1870s map 1940s map modern map 1940s with modern overlay map A series of historical maps of the area around Dayr Ayyub (click the buttons)

- Location within Mandatory Palestine
- Coordinates: 31°49′38″N 35°01′06.45″E
- Palestine grid: 151/137
- Geopolitical entity: Mandatory Palestine
- Subdistrict: Ramle
- Date of depopulation: April, 1948

Area
  - Total: 4,500 dunams (4.5 km^{2}; 1.7 sq mi)

Population (1945)
  - Total: 320
- Cause(s) of depopulation: Military assault by Yishuv forces
- Current Localities: Canada Park

Dayr Ayyub (Arabic: دير أيوب) was a Palestinian Arab village in the Ramle Subdistrict. It was depopulated during the 1947–48 Civil War in Mandatory Palestine on March 6, 1948 by the Givati and Sheva' brigades of Operation Nachshon. It was located 17.5 km southeast of Ramla, situated close to Bab al-Wad. On attack, the village was defended by the Jordanian Army but was mostly destroyed with the exception of a few houses and the village cemetery.

== History ==
To the northwest of the village site is an area which, according to village belief, contained the tomb of the prophet Ayyub, the Biblical Job. Archaeological remains, which attest to major agricultural activity have been found, dating from the Late Hellenistic and the beginning of the Early Roman periods (first century BCE–first century CE).

=== Ottoman era ===
A census by the Ottomans in 1596 registered the village as belonging to the nahiya (subdistrict) of Ramla, part of Gaza Sanjak, and with a recorded population of 17 Muslim households, an estimated 94 persons. The villagers paid a fixed tax rate of 25% on agricultural products, including wheat, barley, and fruits, as well as on other types of produce and property, such as goats, beehives, and vineyards, in addition to occasional revenues; a total of 4,400 akçe. 1/12 of the revenue went to a Waqf.

In 1838, it was noted as a Muslim village, Deir Eyub, in the Ibn Humar area in the District of Er-Ramleh.

Victor Guérin described it in 1863: "it consists of just a few poor houses on a hill, part of which was once occupied by a fairly large building; now only the foundations remain. According to the locals, it was a monastery or convent called Ayoub, a name that later spread to the hamlet itself. At the foot of the hill, in a fertile valley, flows a spring called A'ïn Ayoub (Job's spring), in the middle of an olive grove. The name of Job is thus attached to this well, to this stream, and to this spring, without me being able to give any other plausible reason for such a designation than the great reverence still surrounding the memory of this figure is still surrounded among Muslims, as well as among Jews and Christians."

An Ottoman village list from about 1870 found that the village had a population of 36, in a total of 9 houses, though the population count included men only. In 1883, the PEF's Survey of Western Palestine described it as: "a very small hamlet on the hill-side. There is a fine spring-well (Bir Eyub) about half a mile south-west by the main road, lower down the hill. The water comes up in a circular masonry shaft."

=== British Mandate era ===
In the 1922 census of Palestine conducted by the British Mandate authorities, Dayr Ayyub had a population of 215, all Muslim, increasing slightly in the 1931 census to 229, still all Muslim, in a total of 66 houses.

In 1941, the village was transferred from the Jerusalem sub-district to the Ramle sub-district.

In the 1945 statistics, the village had a population of 320 Muslims. In the 1944/45 growing season, a total of 2,769 dunums of village land was planted in cereals; 127 dunums were irrigated or used for orchards, 10 of which were olive groves, while 26 dunams were built-up (urban) areas.

An elementary school was founded in 1947 in the village, and had an enrollment of 51 students.

=== 1948 and aftermath ===
Dayr Ayyub was first attacked by the predecessors to the Israel Defense Forces on the 21 December 1947, by 25 men, according to the village mukhtar. Three houses in the village were bombed, but there were no reports of casualties. On 7 February 1948, British troops moved into the village and demolished two houses. The Palestinian newspaper Filastin quoted a British communique which said that the houses had been used to fire on Jewish convoys driving by the village.

During and following Operation Nachshon, the village changed hands several times; "The History of the Haganah" indicates that the village was occupied three times in this period.

Benny Morris writes that Dayr Ayyub was depopulated in April, 1948, after military assault by Yishuv forces, however, he also writes that Israeli intelligence noted that the women and children of Dayr Ayyub were sent inland in late August, 1948.

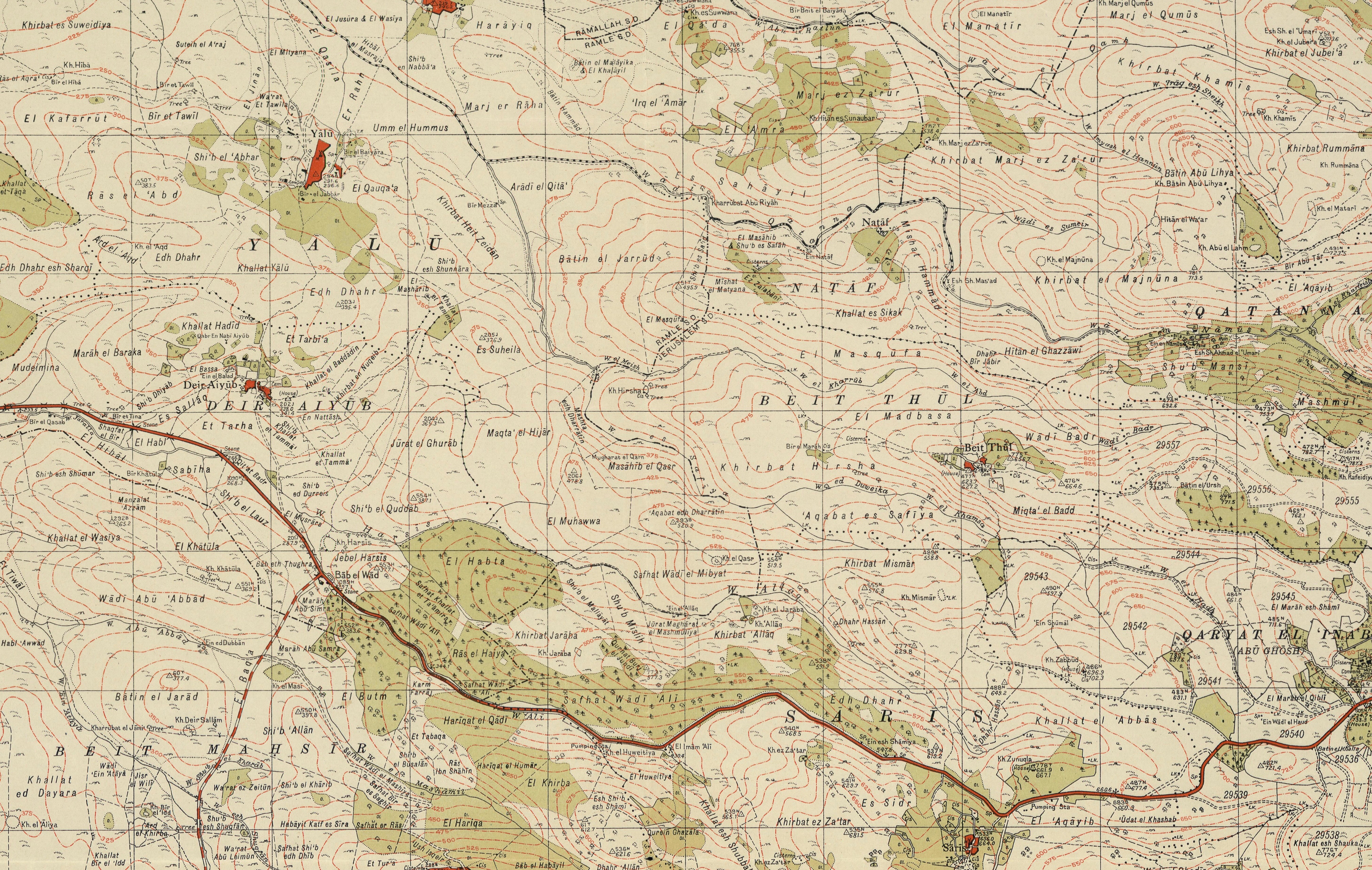
Dayr Ayyub 1943 1:20,000 (middle left)

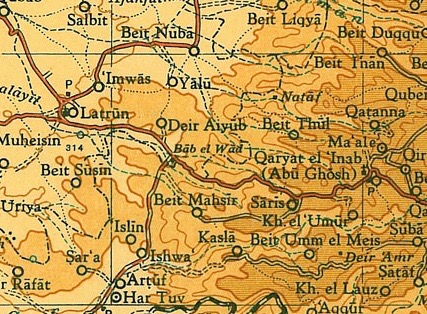
Dayr Ayyub 1945 1:250,000

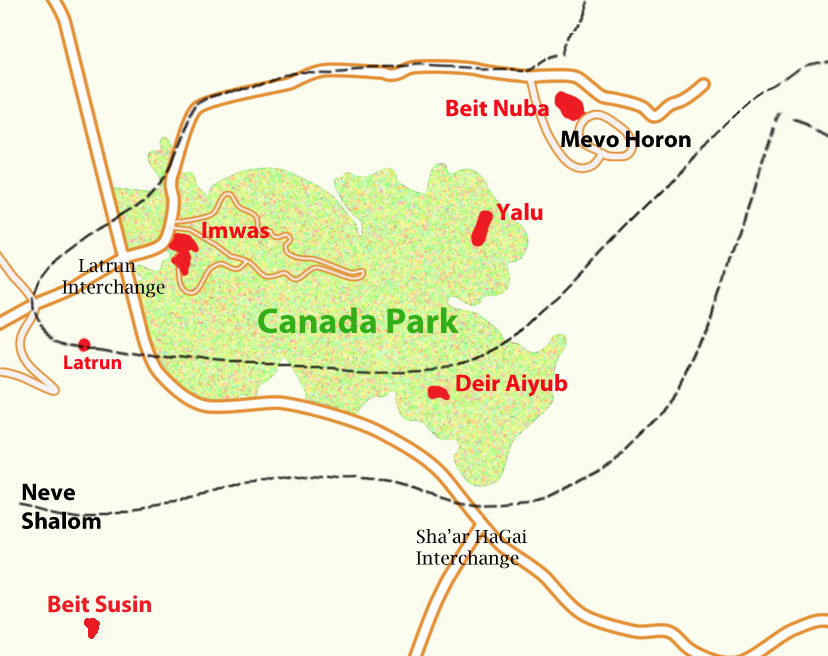
Dayr Ayyub and the 1949 Armistice lines

In the 1949 Armistice Agreements with Jordan, Dayr Ayyub lay in the Latrun salient no man's land. However, the Israeli forces used force to prevent the Palestinian population from re-entering their own homes and claimed the territory following the war. Despite this being a demilitarized zone according to the 1949 agreements, on November 2, 1950, three Palestinian children were shot, two fatally by IDF troops near Dayr Ayyub in the Latrun salient. Ali Muhammad Ali Alyyan (12) his sister Fakhriyeh Muhammad Ali Alyyan (10) and their cousin Khadijeh Abd al Fattah Muhammad Ali (8) all from Yalo village, "The two children [Ali and Fakhriyeh] were stood in a wadi bed and the soldiers opened fire at them. According to both [adult] witnesses only one man fired at them with a sten-gun but none of the detachment attempted to interfere".

The settlement of Mevo Choron, founded in 1970, is north of the village site; there are no Israeli settlements on village land.

The site of Dayr Ayyub lies in the Canada Park reserve. Walid Khalidi described the site in 1992: "[It] is strewn with debris, including parts of walls connected to iron rafters. The remains of houses can be seen on a high hill to the south, opposite the village. The cemetery, located on this hill, to the southeast, contains the remains of a tombstone with the inscription: "AI-Hajj Muhammad 'Ulayyan Taha, died on 14 Muharram 1355 Hijra." [Islamic calendar: equvivalent of 6 April 1936]." Large cypress, eucalyptus, carob, and fig trees dominate the site, mixed with recently planted firs. The valleys are used by Israelis for fig cultivation. A spring at the southeastern edge of the village site is surrounded by a cow pen, and the entire area is fenced in.

== See also ==
- Operation Nachshon
- Canada Park

== Bibliography ==
- Barron, J.B., ed. (1923). Palestine: Report and General Abstracts of the Census of 1922. Government of Palestine.
- Conder, C.R.; Kitchener, H.H. (1883). The Survey of Western Palestine: Memoirs of the Topography, Orography, Hydrography, and Archaeology. Vol. 3. London: Committee of the Palestine Exploration Fund.
- Government of Palestine, Department of Statistics (1945). Village Statistics, April, 1945.
- Guérin, V. (1868). Description Géographique Historique et Archéologique de la Palestine (in French). Vol. 1: Judee, pt. 1. Paris: L'Imprimerie Nationale.
- Hadawi, S. (1970). Village Statistics of 1945: A Classification of Land and Area ownership in Palestine. Palestine Liberation Organization Research Centre.
- Hartmann, M. (1883). "Die Ortschaftenliste des Liwa Jerusalem in dem türkischen Staatskalender für Syrien auf das Jahr 1288 der Flucht (1871)". Zeitschrift des Deutschen Palästina-Vereins. 6: 102–149.
- Hütteroth, W.-D.; Abdulfattah, K. (1977). Historical Geography of Palestine, Transjordan and Southern Syria in the Late 16th Century. Erlanger Geographische Arbeiten, Sonderband 5. Erlangen, Germany: Vorstand der Fränkischen Geographischen Gesellschaft. ISBN 3-920405-41-2.
- Khalidi, W. (1992). All That Remains: The Palestinian Villages Occupied and Depopulated by Israel in 1948. Washington D.C.: Institute for Palestine Studies. ISBN 0-88728-224-5.
- Mills, E., ed. (1932). Census of Palestine 1931. Population of Villages, Towns and Administrative Areas. Jerusalem: Government of Palestine.
- Mor, Daniel Ein (2010-09-24). "Deir Ayub (East)" (122). Hadashot Arkheologiyot – Excavations and Surveys in Israel.
- Morris, B. (2004). The Birth of the Palestinian Refugee Problem Revisited. Cambridge University Press. ISBN 978-0-521-00967-6.
- Morris, B. (1993). Israel's Border Wars, 1949 - 1956. Arab Infiltration, Israeli Retaliation, and the Countdown to the Suez War. Oxford University Press. ISBN 0-19-827850-0.
- Palmer, E.H. (1881). The Survey of Western Palestine: Arabic and English Name Lists Collected During the Survey by Lieutenants Conder and Kitchener, R. E. Transliterated and Explained by E.H. Palmer. Committee of the Palestine Exploration Fund.
- Robinson, E.; Smith, E. (1841). Biblical Researches in Palestine, Mount Sinai and Arabia Petraea: A Journal of Travels in the year 1838. Vol. 3. Boston: Crocker & Brewster.
- Socin, A. (1879). "Alphabetisches Verzeichniss von Ortschaften des Paschalik Jerusalem". Zeitschrift des Deutschen Palästina-Vereins. 2: 135–163.
