= 252nd Division (Israel) =

Unit of the Israel Defense Forces

252nd Division "Sinai"
- עוצבת סיני
- 252nd Division insignia, depicting a fox similar to that of the Southern Commands logo
- Founded: 1968–present
- Country: Israel
- Branch: Israeli Ground Forces
- Size: Division
- Part of: Southern Command
- Engagements: War of Attrition; Yom Kippur War; 1982 Lebanon War; Gaza war; Battle of Beit Hanoun

Commanders
- Current commander: Tat Aluf Yehuda Vach

The 252nd Division "Sinai" (Hebrew: עוצבת סיני) is an Israel Defense Forces reserve division under the Southern Command. Formed in 1968, it was the first permanent division in the IDF. As of August 2024, it is commanded by Brigadier General Yehuda Vach.

== History ==
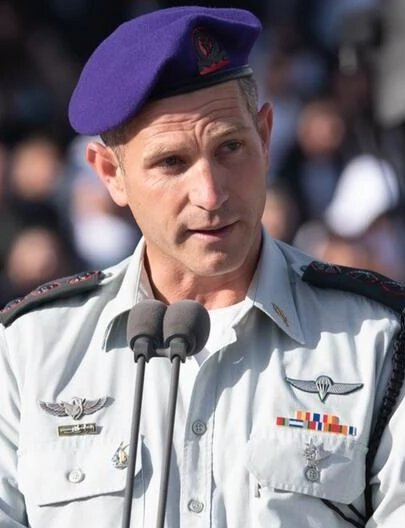
Yehuda Vach, commander of the 252nd Division

The unit was created in 1968 in an effort to unify Israeli armoured forces in the Sinai, taking an active part in the War of Attrition. It later took an active part in the Yom Kippur War. During the First Lebanon War, it operated on the eastern wing of the Israeli forces pushing into Lebanon. In the 21st century, the division has been charged with securing the border with Egypt.

The unit played an active role in the Gaza war. The Israel Defense Forces said that "the 252nd Division has killed hundreds of Hamas operatives, including senior members, in Beit Hanoun and Jabaliya."

The unit has been accused of arbitrary killings of civilians by Haaretz. The current commander Yehuda Vach has been accused of claiming that "there are no innocents in Gaza" in the same article.

The IDF has repeatedly denied similar allegations in front of the International Court of Justice.

== Division organization ==
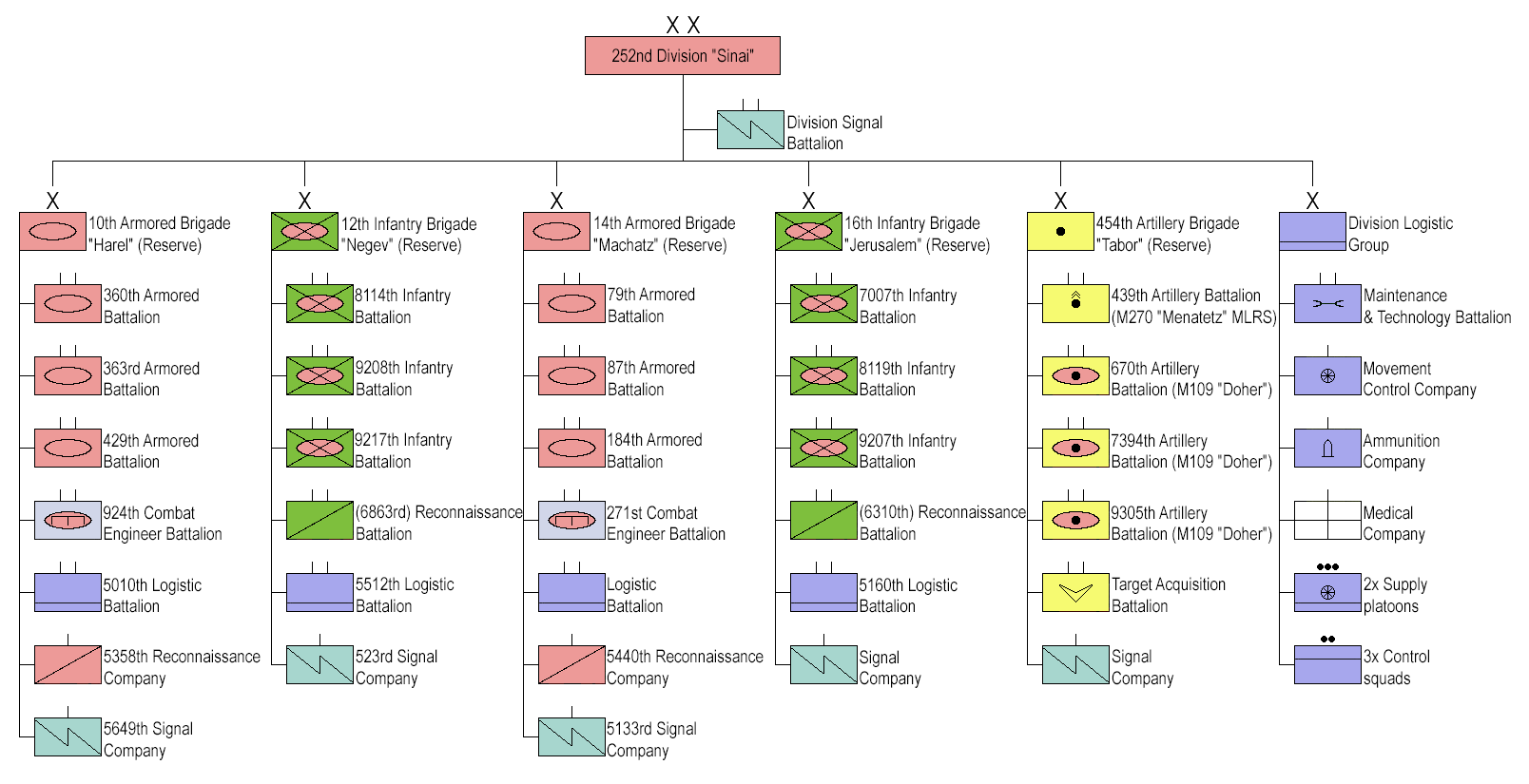
252nd Division "Sinai" organization as of November 2026

- 252nd Division "Sinai" (Reserve)
  - 10th Armored Brigade "Harel" (Reserve)
    - 360th Armored Battalion
    - 363rd Armored Battalion
    - 429th Armored Battalion
    - 924th Combat Engineering Battalion
    - 5358th Reconnaissance Company
    - 5010th Logistic Battalion
    - 5649th Signal Company
  - 12th Infantry Brigade "Negev" (Reserve)
    - 8114th Infantry Battalion
    - 9208th Infantry Battalion
    - 9217th Infantry Battalion
    - (6863rd) Reconnaissance Battalion
    - 5512th Logistic Battalion
    - 523rd Signal Company
  - 14th Armored Brigade "Machatz" (Reserve)
    - 79th Armored Battalion
    - 87th Armored Battalion
    - 184th Armored Battalion
    - 271st Combat Engineering Battalion
    - 5440th Reconnaissance Company
    - Logistic Battalion
    - 5133rd Signal Company
  - 16th Infantry Brigade "Jerusalem" (Reserve)
    - 7007th Infantry Battalion
    - 8119th Infantry Battalion
    - 9207th Infantry Battalion
    - (6310th) Reconnaissance Battalion
    - 5160th Logistic Battalion
    - Signal Company
  - 261st Infantry Brigade "Ramon" (Reserve)
    - Infantry Battalion "Geffen" (Bahad 1 Officers Cadets; acts as third battalion of the 261st Infantry Brigade in wartime)
    - 8208th Infantry Battalion
    - 8717th Infantry Battalion
    - (6261st) Reconnaissance Battalion
    - Logistic Battalion
    - Signal Company
  - 454th Artillery Brigade "Tabor" ("Fire Flame") (Reserve)
    - 439th Artillery Battalion (M270 "Menatetz" MLRS)
    - 670th Artillery Battalion (M109 "Doher" self-propelled howitzers)
    - 7394th Artillery Battalion (M109 "Doher" self-propelled howitzers)
    - 9305th Artillery Battalion (M109 "Doher" self-propelled howitzers)
    - Target Acquisition Battalion
    - Signal Company
  - Division Logistic Group
  - Division Signal Battalion
