= Harel Brigade =

Reserve brigade of the Israel Defense Forces

- חטיבת הראל
- Brigade insignia
- Active: 1948–present
- Country: Israel
- Allegiance: Israeli Ground Forces
- Branch: Infantry
- Type: Reserves
- Size: 5 battalions
- Part of: Armored Corps
- Engagements: 1948 Arab–Israeli War; Battles of Latrun; Operation Harel; Operation Yevusi; Operation Maccabi; Operation Danny; Operation Ha-Har; Operation Horev; Sinai War; Six-Day War; Battle of Radar Hill; Battle of Radar Hill; Yom Kippur War; First Lebanon War; Second Lebanon War; Operation Protective Edge; Operation Swords of Iron; Battle of Beit Hanoun

Commanders
- Notable commanders: Yitzhak Rabin; Joseph Tabenkin

The 10th "Harel" Brigade (Hebrew: חטיבת הראל, Hativat Harel) is a reserve armoured brigade of the Israel Defense Forces, today part of the Southern Command. It played a critical role in the 1948 Palestine war. It is one of the former divisions of the Palmach, the elite fighting force of the Haganah, that remains in the IDF.

== History ==
=== 1948 ===
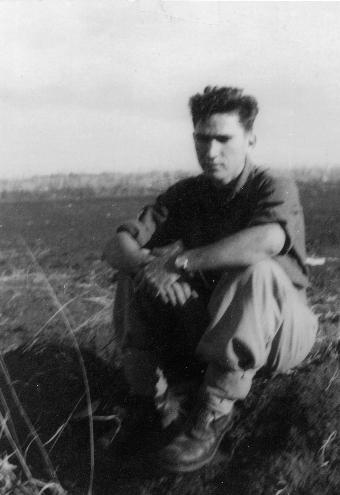
Rafael Eitan, Commander Company A, 4th Battalion, Harel Brigade (1948)

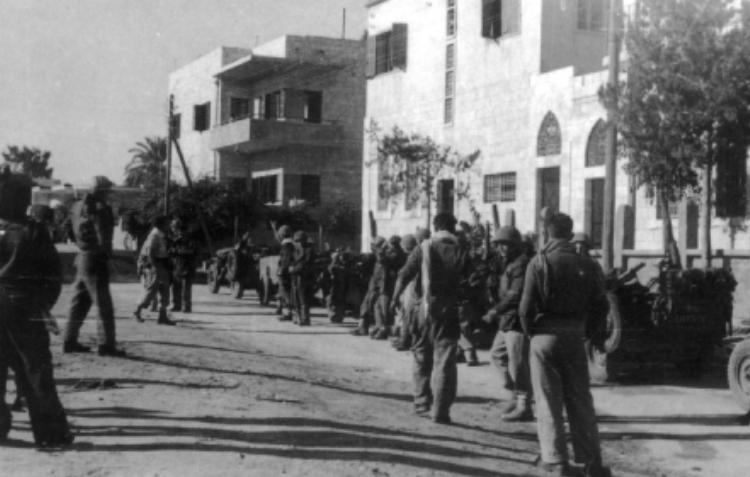
Ramleh, 1948. Harel 10th Battalion HQ.

The Harel Brigade was established on 16 April 1948 as a division of the Palmach, immediately after Operation Nachshon. It was composed of three battalions, Sha'ar Hagai Battalion - known as the Fifth Battalion; Ha-portzim Battalion - known as the Fourth Battalion; and the Sixth Battalion ("Jerusalem Battalion"). 1,400 men, which had fought in Operation Nachshon in the Jerusalem area. Its name Harel ("Mountain of God") is taken from mount Zion in Jerusalem.

This infantry unit was headed by Yitzhak Rabin, its first commander. He was later replaced by Joseph Tabenkin. During the early phase of the 1948 Palestine War, the Israeli war of independence, the Palmach units became tactical combat units. In April 1948, the Harel brigade was formed to command all units in the Jerusalem corridor and hills. The Brigade's main assignments, besides acting as a "diversionary force" whenever needed, were twofold:

- To fortify the area, guarding against attacks by the local Arab forces, and gaining ground where ever possible, in order to allow passage of supply convoys to Jerusalem.
- To train and organize troops in the framework of the army-in-the-making.

Upon its establishment, the brigade commenced with Operation Harel, a direct continuation of Operation Nachshon, between 16 and 21 April 1948. On April 22, the brigade was assigned to Operation Yevusi with the goal of taking control of the northern ridges overlooking Jerusalem, and then taking control of the city's southern neighborhoods. During this operation the brigade sustained thirty-three killed in the battle for Nebi Samuel and nineteen dead in the Katamon neighborhood.

In Operation Maccabi during the first half of May 1948, the Harel Brigade took control of the Jerusalem corridor and opened the road until Shaar Hagai. On 17–19 May, a Harel force took Mount Zion and entered the Jewish Quarter in the Old City of Jerusalem.

Later the brigade took part in Operation Danny, Operation Ha-Har, and Operation Horev.

The Palmach memorial website records 274 of its members dying while fighting with the Harel Brigade. Thirty-four were killed at Nabi Samuel and eighteen in Katamon.

=== Suez Crisis ===
In 1956, during the Suez Crisis, Kadesh Operation, the brigade fought as an infantry brigade, commanded by Shmuel Gudar. In 1959, the brigade was made into a reserve unit of the Armored Corps.

=== Six-Day War ===
During the Six-Day War, the Harel Brigade used Sherman tanks in fighting at Radar Hill, north of Jerusalem, and went on to capture Ramallah.

=== 21st century ===
In 2014, the Brigade became part of the Sinai Division and it participated in Operation Protective Edge. Under Colonel Itamar Michaeli, the brigade participated in combat in and around the city of Beit Hanoun as part of Operation Swords of Iron.

== Units ==
- 10th Armored Brigade "Harel" (Reserve)
  - 360th Armored Battalion
  - 363rd Armored Battalion
  - 429th Armored Battalion
  - 924th Combat Engineer Battalion
  - 5358th Reconnaissance Company
  - 5010th Logistic Battalion
  - 5649th Signal Company

== See also ==
- List of battles and operations in the 1948 Palestine war
