= Operation Yevusi =

- Part of the 1947–1948 Civil War in Mandatory Palestine
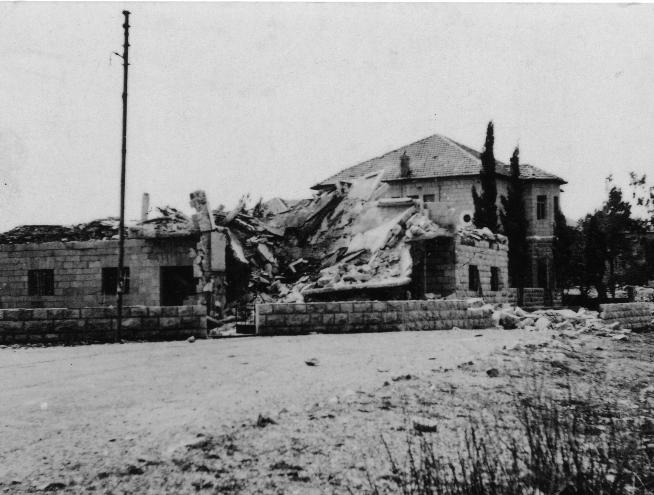
- Katamon after Operation Yevusi
Date	22 April – 3 May 1948
Location	(United Kingdom) Jerusalem, Mandatory Palestine
Result	Inconclusive: Ceasefire imposed by the British army
Territorial changes	Katamon captured by the Palmach

Belligerents
(Israel) Yishuv; Haganah; Palmach; Etzioni Brigade; Harel Brigade	Arab Higher Committee; Army of the Holy War; Arab Liberation Army; Arab Legion; Irregulars: Local Arabs	United Kingdom; Mandatory Palestine

Commanders and leaders
(Israel) Yitzhak Sadeh	Ibrahim Abu Daya; Kamil Uraiqat (irregulars)	(Mandatory Palestine) Gordon MacMillan

Strength
Two brigades	unknown	

Casualties and losses
Over 70	Over 80	

Operation Yevusi (Hebrew: מבצע יבוסי; Eng. "Jebusite"), also known as the Second Battle of Nebi Samwil, was a Palmach military operation carried out during the 1948 Arab–Israeli War to assert Jewish control over Jerusalem. The operation, commanded by Yitzhak Sadeh, lasted two weeks, from 22 April 1948 to 3 May 1948. Not all objectives were achieved before the British enforced a ceasefire.

== History ==
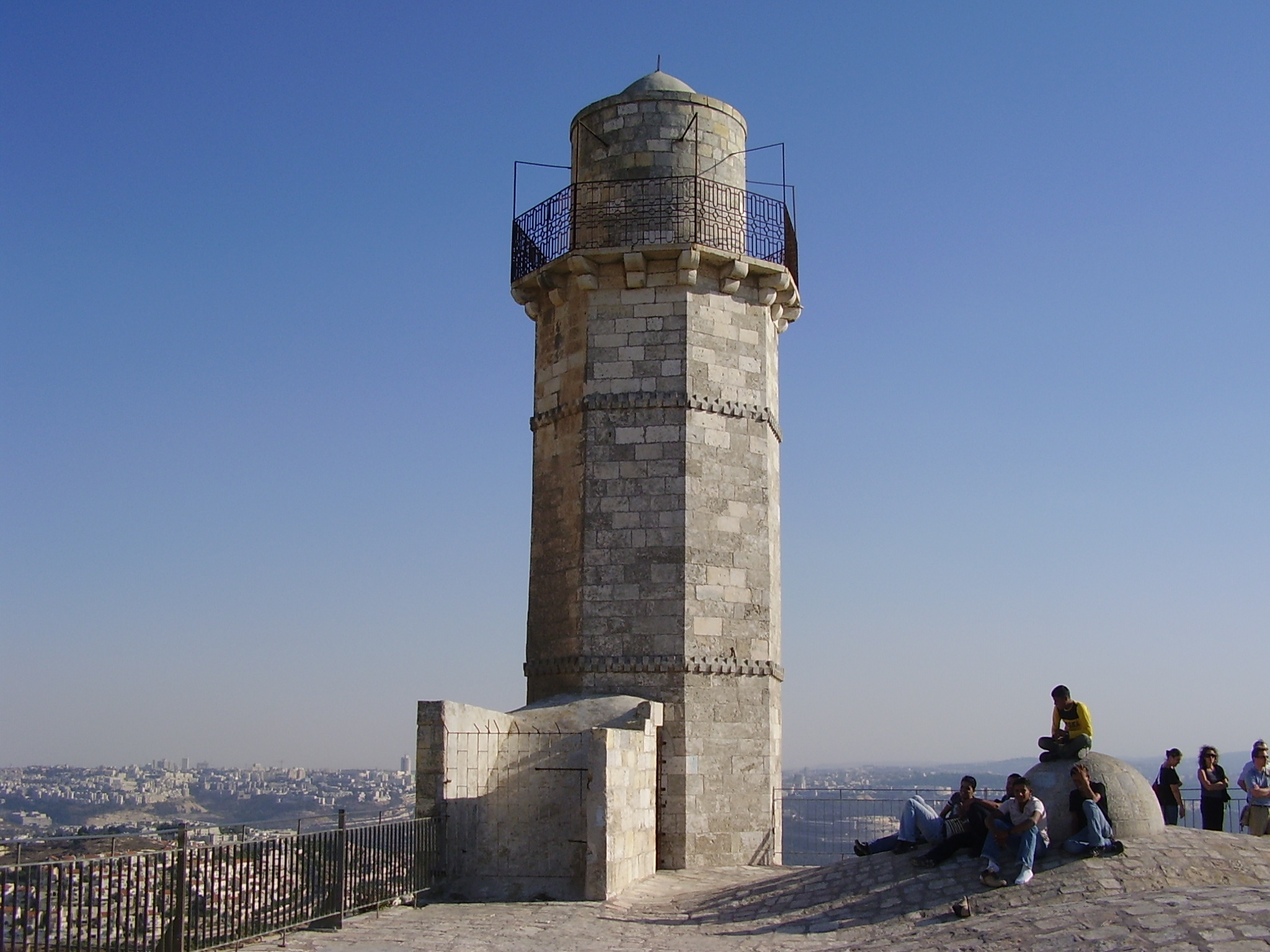
Nabi Samuel

Operation Yevusi was mounted in the wake of the Battle for Jerusalem. The operation had four objectives: Control of Nabi Samuel, an Arab village northwest of Jerusalem and the highest point in the area; Sheikh Jarrah, an Arab residential quarter north of the city wall controlling the road to Mount Scopus; Katamon, a middle class, mainly Arab Christian suburb of southwest Jerusalem; and Augusta Victoria east of the Old City.

=== Nabi Samuel and Sheikh Jarrah ===
The Harel Brigade arrived in Jerusalem on Wednesday 21 April. Their convoy had taken eight hours under fire to reach the city. The following day they started attacking the ridge of Nabi Samuel (Battle of Nebi Semwil (1948)), but on the 23rd a company from Harel was ambushed and forced to retreat, losing 30-40 men. On the night of 24/25 April, Sadeh occupied Sheikh Jarrah, where 40 Arabs were killed and 20 homes were blown up.

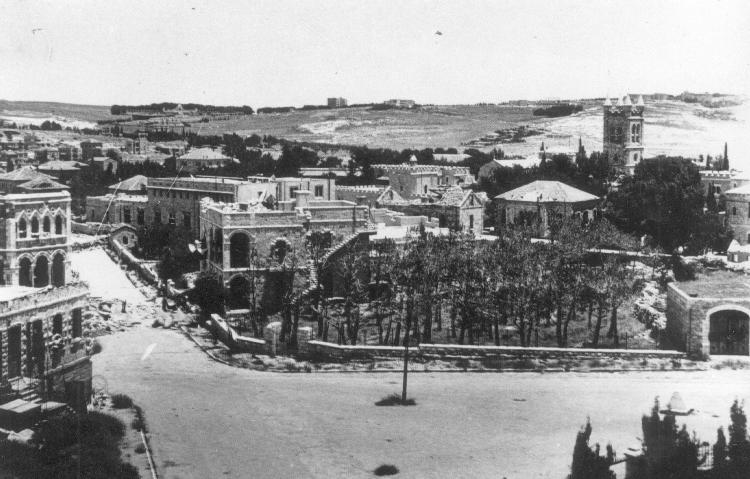
Sheikh Jarrah briefly held by the Harel Brigade (Palmach) 24 April 1948

General Macmillan, commander of the British forces in Palestine, called on the Jewish forces to retreat because British forces used this road to reach the north of the country. MacMillan promised to prevent the return of the Arabs. After the British Army opened fire, the Palmach withdrew. The British declared Sheikh Jarrah a demilitarized zone which armed troops from either side could not enter.

=== Katamon ===
On 29 April, one week after the start of the operation, Sadeh switched the attack to Katamon. The main target was the Greek Orthodox San Simon monastery, which was held by local Arab fighters with a contingent of volunteers from Iraq. There was also a unit from the Arab Legion guarding the empty Iraqi Consulate. John Bagot Glubb ordered them to withdraw after the surrounding buildings had been taken. The attack began with a mortar and machine gun barrage, before members of Harel's 4th and 5th Battalions, aided by Etzion's 4th Battalion and totaling 120 men, struck south and eastwards from Neve Shaanan. The battle for the monastery lasted all day, with the number of Jewish fighters killed given by one source as forty, though other estimates are much lower. Another source states eighty Arabs were killed. During the evening of 30 April the area was shaken by two large explosions. By the following day, 1 May, the Jews had complete control of the area. Once again the British intervened and demanded a ceasefire. But this time the Jews remained in control of the area taken. While the attack on Katamon was taking place Arabs in the Old City fired on Jewish positions in Yemin Moshe and only stopped after action by the British Army.

== Aftermath ==
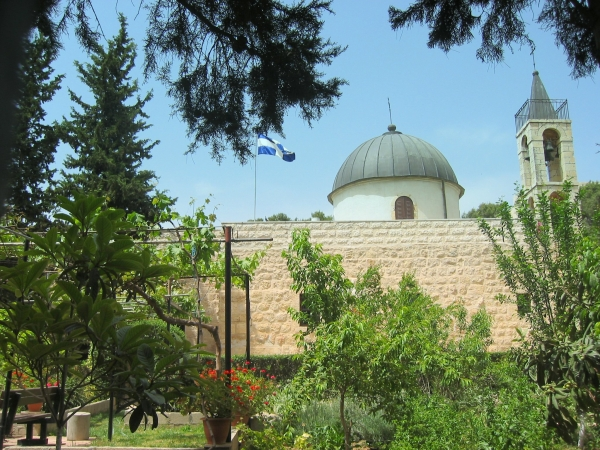
San Simon monastery in Katamon

With the operation only partially successful, Sadeh left Jerusalem. Dov Joseph, the military governor of Jerusalem, ordered teams of men into Katamon to requisition all food they could find to alleviate the severe food shortages caused by the Arab blockade which led to draconian rationing in March 1948. The district was then looted. By the end of the war Israel had control of 12 of Jerusalem's 15 Arab residential quarters. An estimated minimum of 30,000 people had become refugees. About 750 non-Jews remained in the occupied Arab neighbourhoods; many of them Greeks living in the Greek Colony.

=== Awards and Medals ===
==== Israel ====
- Haganah Ribbon - Awarded to all those that served in the Haganah for at least 6 months between 1920 and 1948.
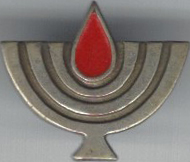
- Decoration of State Warriors - Awarded to members of military or paramilitary organizations who fought for the establishment of the state of Israel.
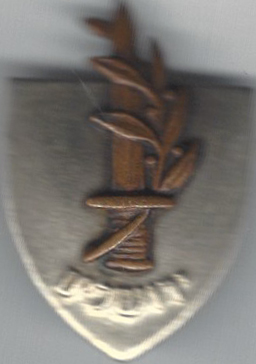
- Defence of Jerusalem Badge - Awarded to every soldier who served under the command of the O.C. Jerusalem area between 1 April 1948 and 10 June 1948.
- Katamon Medal - The Katamon Medal was first struck in May 1948 and presented in July 1949 to soldiers that were present at the battle. Soon after it was awarded, the IDF withdrawal recognition of the medal.

==== United Kingdom (Inc Arab Legion) ====
- General Service Medal (1918) with "PALESTINE 1945-48" clasp

== See also ==
- Depopulated Palestinian locations in Israel
