= List of brigades of the Israel Defense Forces =

This is a list of brigades in the Israel Defense Forces.

== Active brigades ==
=== Active infantry brigades ===
- 1st Infantry Brigade "Golani"
- 35th Paratroopers Brigade "Shfifon"
- 89th Commando Brigade "Oz"
- 84th Infantry Brigade "Givati"
- 613th Infantry Brigade "Hasmonean"
- 828th Infantry Brigade "Bislamach" (In peacetime functions as Infantry School)
- 900th Infantry Brigade "Kfir"
- 933rd Infantry Brigade "Nahal"

=== Active armored brigades ===
- 7th Armored Brigade "Saar me-Golan"
- 188th Armored Brigade "Barak"
- 401st Armored Brigade "I'kvot ha-Barzel"
- 460th Armored Brigade "Bnei Or" (In peacetime functions as Armor School)

=== Active artillery brigades ===
- 214th Artillery Brigade "David's Sling"
- 215th Artillery Brigade "Amud HaEsh"
- 282nd Artillery Brigade "Golan"
- 425th Artillery Brigade "Shivta" (In peacetime functions as Artillery School)

=== Active territorial brigades ===
- 300th Territorial Brigade "Bar'am" – Western section of the Israel Lebanon border
- 406th Territorial Brigade "Yoav" – Western section of the Egypt–Israel barrier
- 417th Territorial Brigade – Jordan Valley sector
- 421st Territorial Brigade "Ephraim" – Qalqilya sector
- 426th Territorial Brigade "Etzion" – Bethlehem sector
- 431st Territorial Brigade "Menashe" – Jenin and Tulkarm sectors
- 434th Territorial Brigade "Yehuda" – Hebron sector
- 442nd Territorial Brigade "Samaria" – Nablus sector
- 443rd Territorial Brigade "Benjamin" – Ramallah sector and Road 443
- 474th Territorial Brigade "Golan" – Golan Heights sector
- 512th Territorial Brigade "Paran" – Eastern section of the Egypt–Israel barrier
- 769th Territorial Brigade "Hiram" – Eastern section of the Israel Lebanon border
- 810th Mountain Brigade – Mount Hermon sector
- 6643rd Territorial Brigade "Katif" – Southern section of the Gaza–Israel barrier
- 7643rd Territorial Brigade "Gefen" – Northern section of the Gaza–Israel barrier

== Reserve brigades ==
=== Reserve infantry brigades ===
- 2nd Infantry Brigade "Carmeli"
- 3rd Infantry Brigade "Alexandroni"
- 5th Infantry Brigade "HaSharon"
- 6th Infantry Brigade "Etzioni"
- 9th Infantry Brigade "Oded"
- 11th Infantry Brigade "Yiftach"
- 12th Infantry Brigade "Negev"
- 16th Infantry Brigade "Jerusalem"
- 55th Paratroopers Brigade "Hod Ha-Hanit"
- 182nd Infantry Brigade "Uri"
- 185th Infantry Brigade "Tel Hai"
- 186th Infantry Brigade "Jezreel"
- 187th Infantry Brigade "Jonathan"
- 189th Infantry Brigade "Negba"
- 226th Paratroopers Brigade "Nesher"
- 228th Infantry Brigade "Alon"
- 261st Infantry Brigade (IDF Officers' School Brigade)
- 551st Paratroopers Brigade "Hetzei HaEsch"
- 646th Paratroopers Brigade "Schualey Marom"
- 5692th Infantry Brigade "Ari"
- 6050th Infantry Brigade "Daniel"
- 6070th Infantry Brigade "Shiloh"

=== Reserve armored brigades ===
- 4th Armored Brigade "Kiryati"
- 8th Armored Brigade "HaZaken"
- 10th Armored Brigade "Harel"
- 14th Armored Brigade "Machatz"
- 179th Armored Brigade "Re'em"
- 205th Armored Brigade "Egrof HaBarzel"
- 500th Armored Brigade (1972 – inactivated 2003; reactivated 2026)
- 679th Armored Brigade "Yiftach"

=== Reserve artillery brigades ===
- 209th Artillery Brigade "Kidon"
- 213th Artillery Brigade "HaTkuma"
- 454th Artillery Brigade "Tabor"
- 990th Artillery Brigade (Reserve artillery command without permanently attached battalions)
- 7338th Artillery Brigade "Adirim"

== Former brigades ==
- Jewish Brigade 1944 – 1946
- 600th Brigade 1971 – 2014

== IDF Brigade Insignia ==
1st Golani Brigade

2nd Carmeli Brigade later renamed 188th Brigade

3rd Alexandroni Brigade

4th Kiryati Brigade

5th Givati Brigade in 1948

6th "Jerusalem" Etzioni Brigade

7th Armored Brigade (Israel)

8th Armored Brigade (Israel)

9th Oded Brigade

10th "Harel" (Reserve) Armor Brigade

11th Yiftach Brigade

12th Negev Brigade

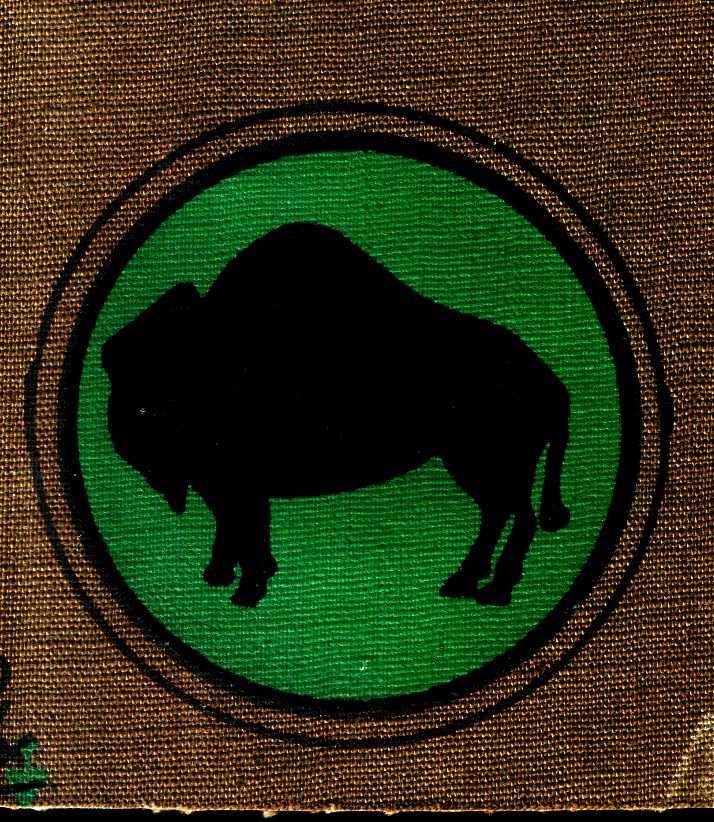
14th "Machatz/Bison" (Reserve) Armor Brigade

35th Paratrooper Brigade [Old Tag]

35th Paratrooper Brigade

37th "Ram" (Reserve) Armor Brigade

55th Paratrooper Brigade {Formerly 247th Brigade]

84th Givati Brigade

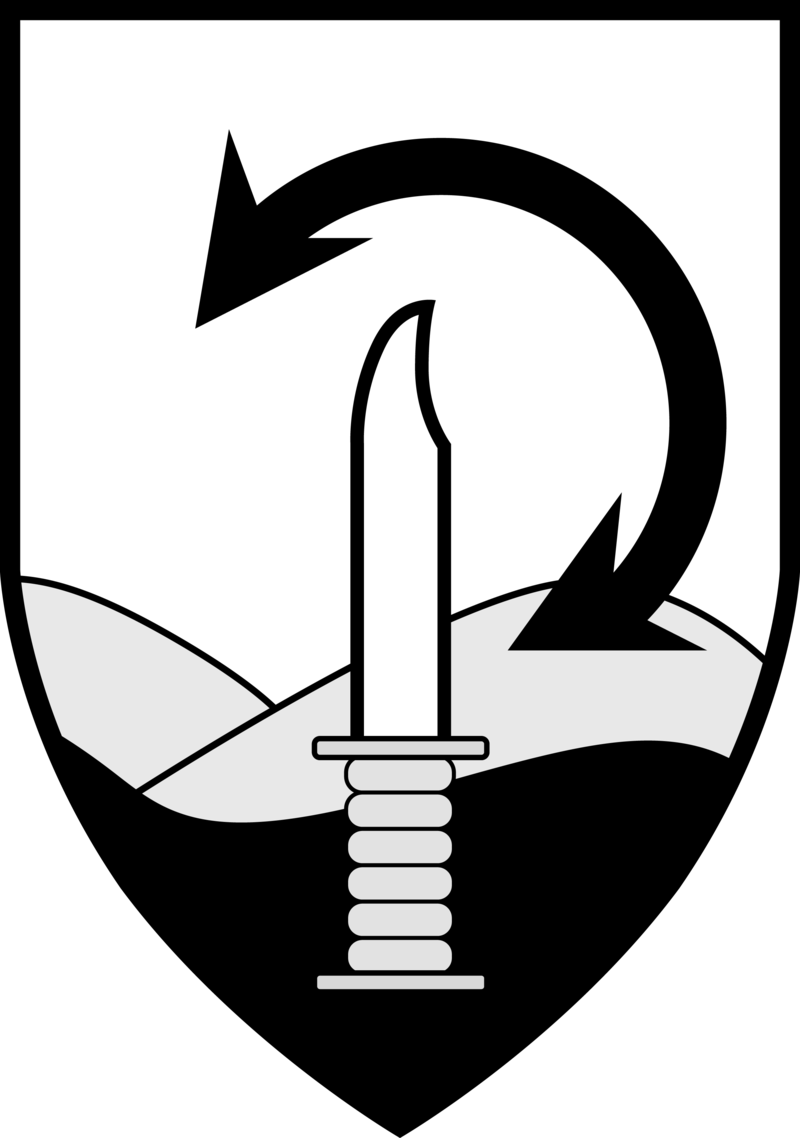
89th Oz Brigade

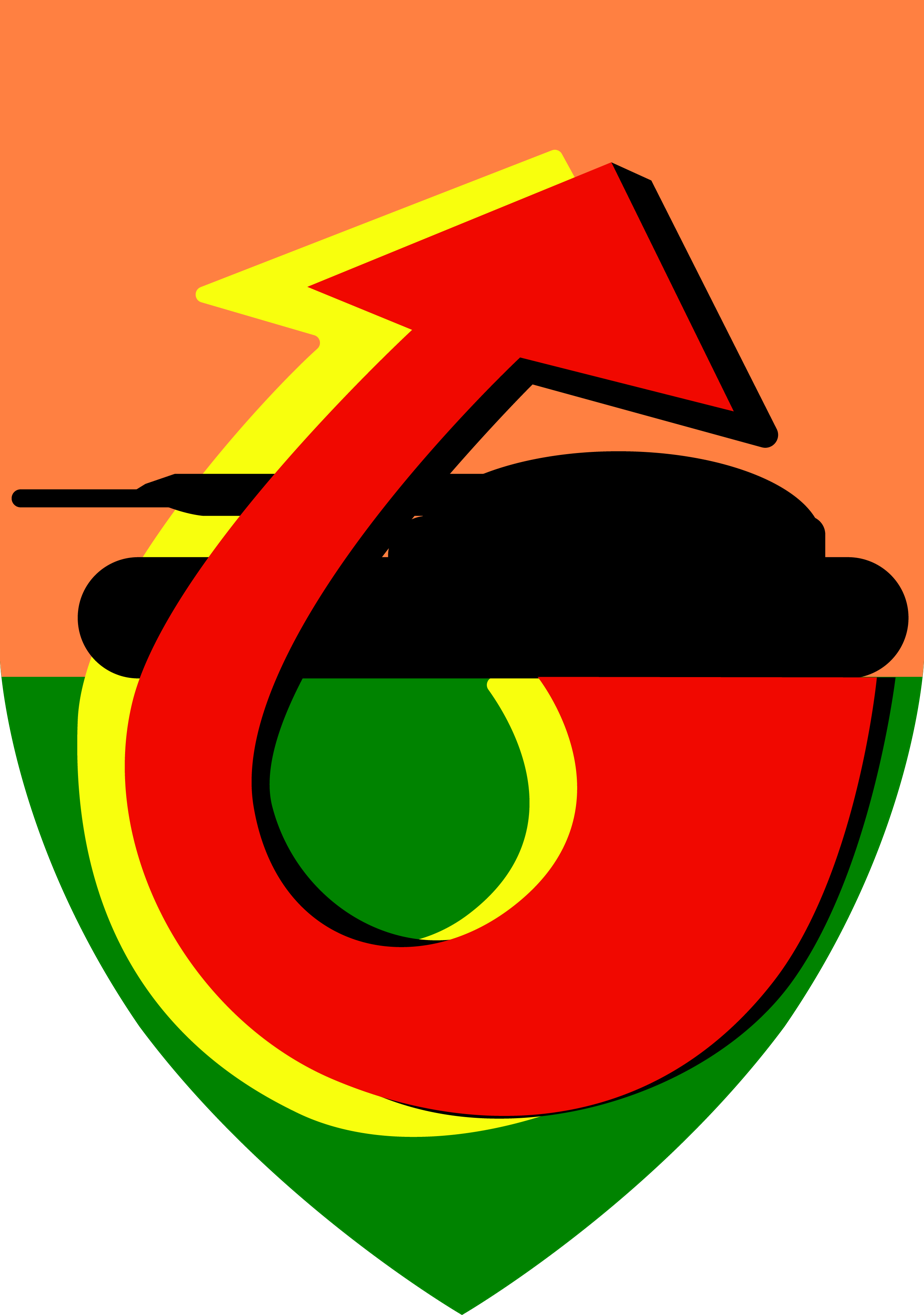
130th Brigade

188th Armored Brigade [formerly 2nd Carmeli Brigade]

205th "Iron Fist" (Reserve) Armor Brigade

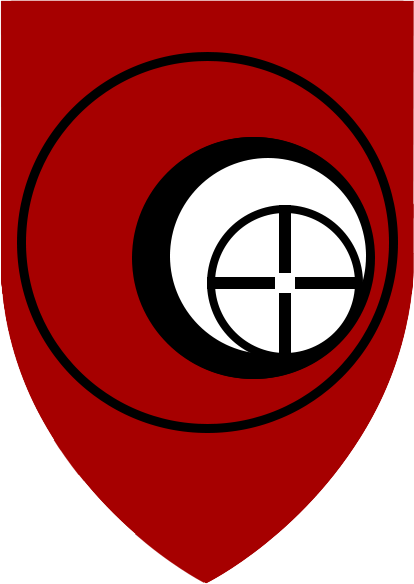
214th Artillery Brigade

263rd "Merkavot ha-Esh/Chariots of Fire" (Reserve) Armor Brigade

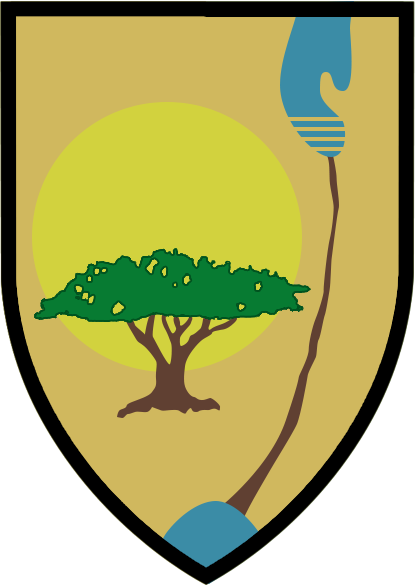
270th Arava Brigade

292th Armor Brigade

401st Brigade

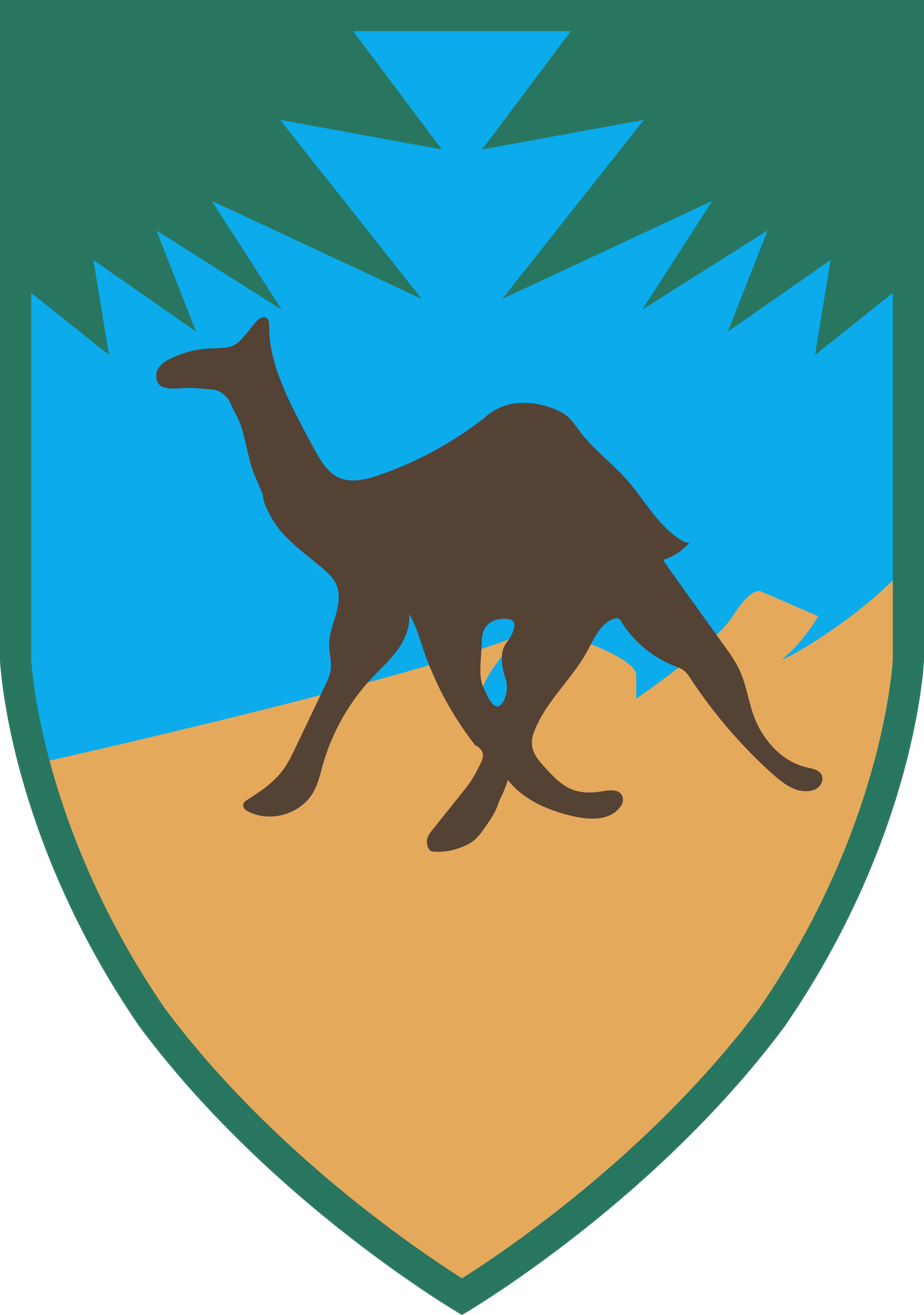
Arava Territorial Brigade 416 (270 today) old tag

421st Armor Brigade (active 1972-1986)

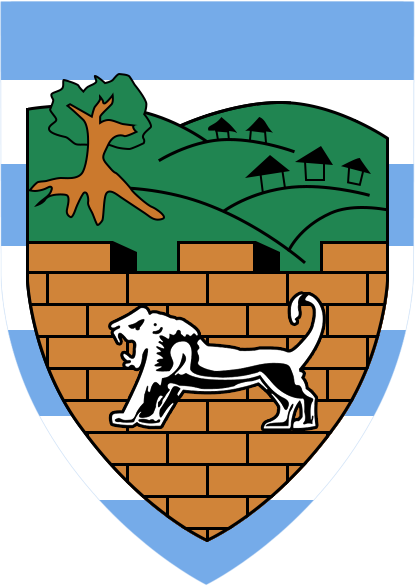
421st Ephraim Brigade

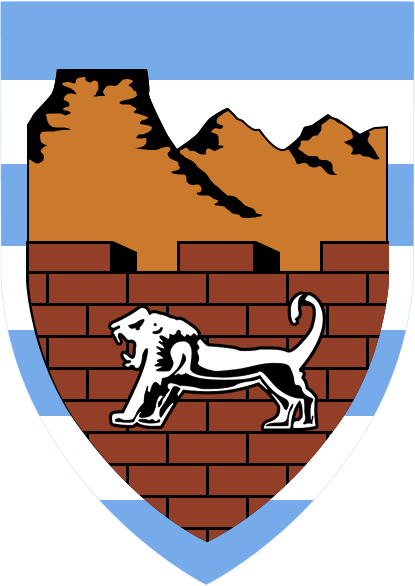
426st Etzion Brigade

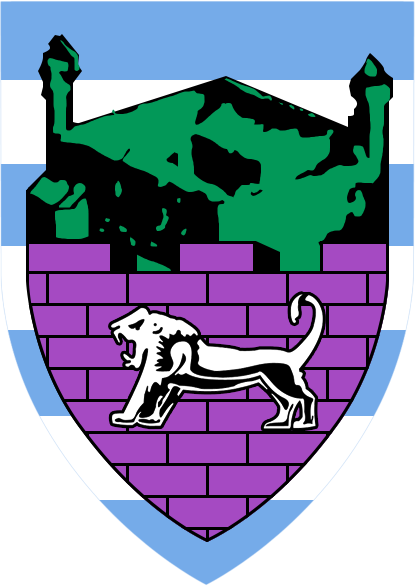
434th Judea Brigade

460st Brigade

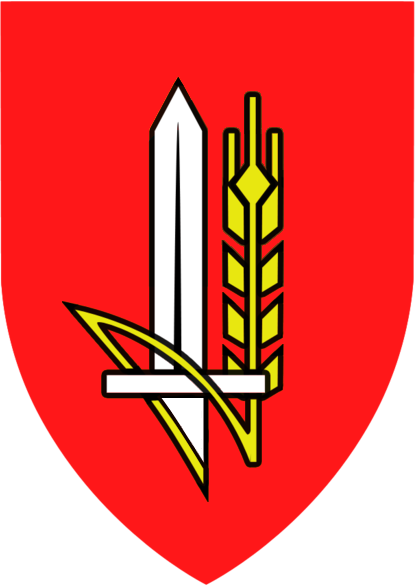
474th Golan Brigade

500th Armored Brigade

600th Brigade

646th Paratrooper Brigade

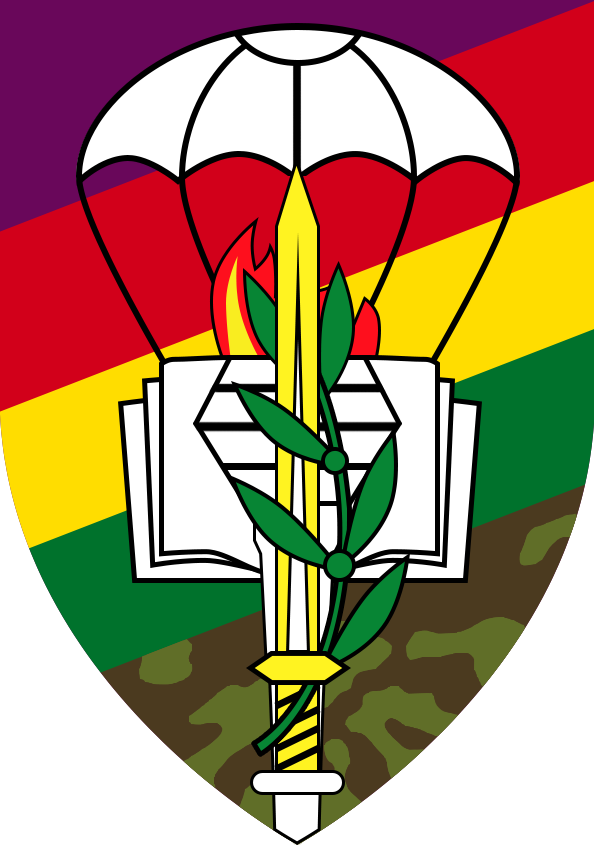
828th Bislamach Brigade

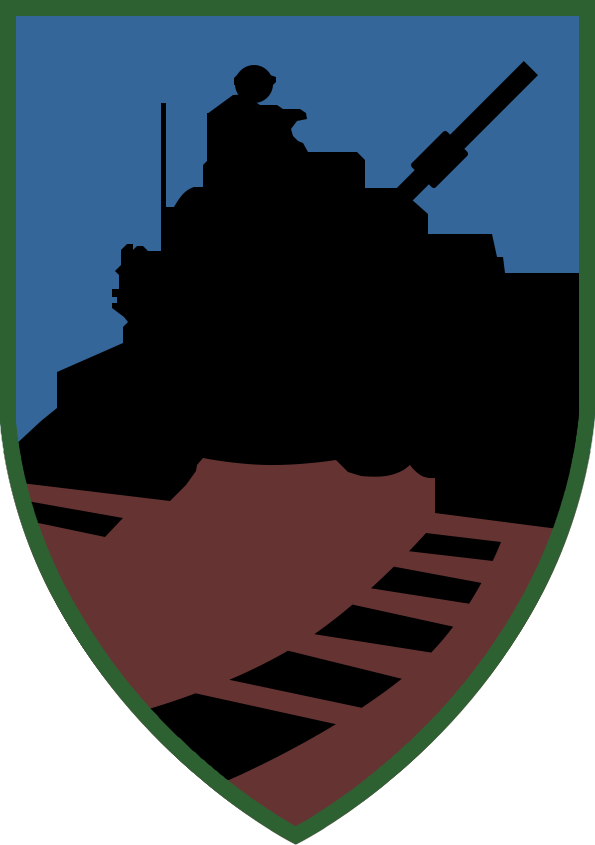
847th "Chariots of Steel" (Reserve) Armor Brigade

Paran Brigade

== Division insignia ==
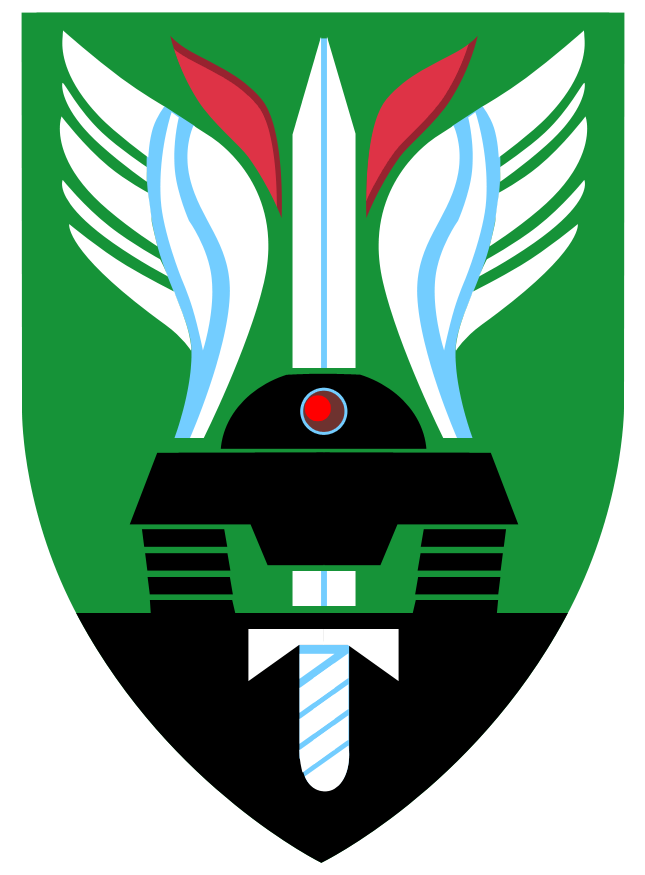
36th " Ga'ash Formation ("Rage") Armor Division

80th "Edom" Division

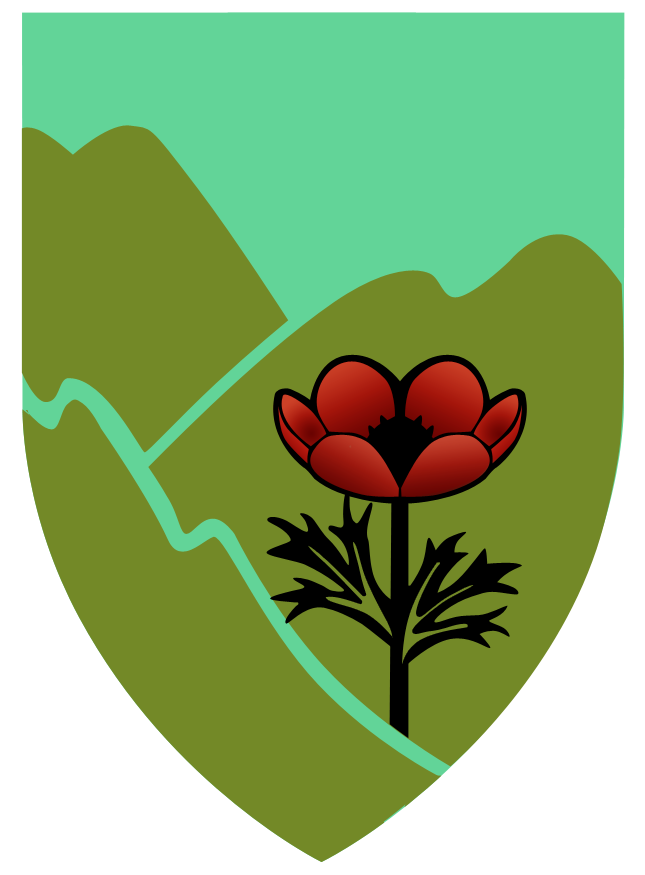
91st "Gailee Formation" Division

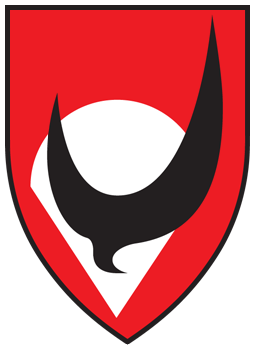
98th "Fire Formation" Paratroop Division

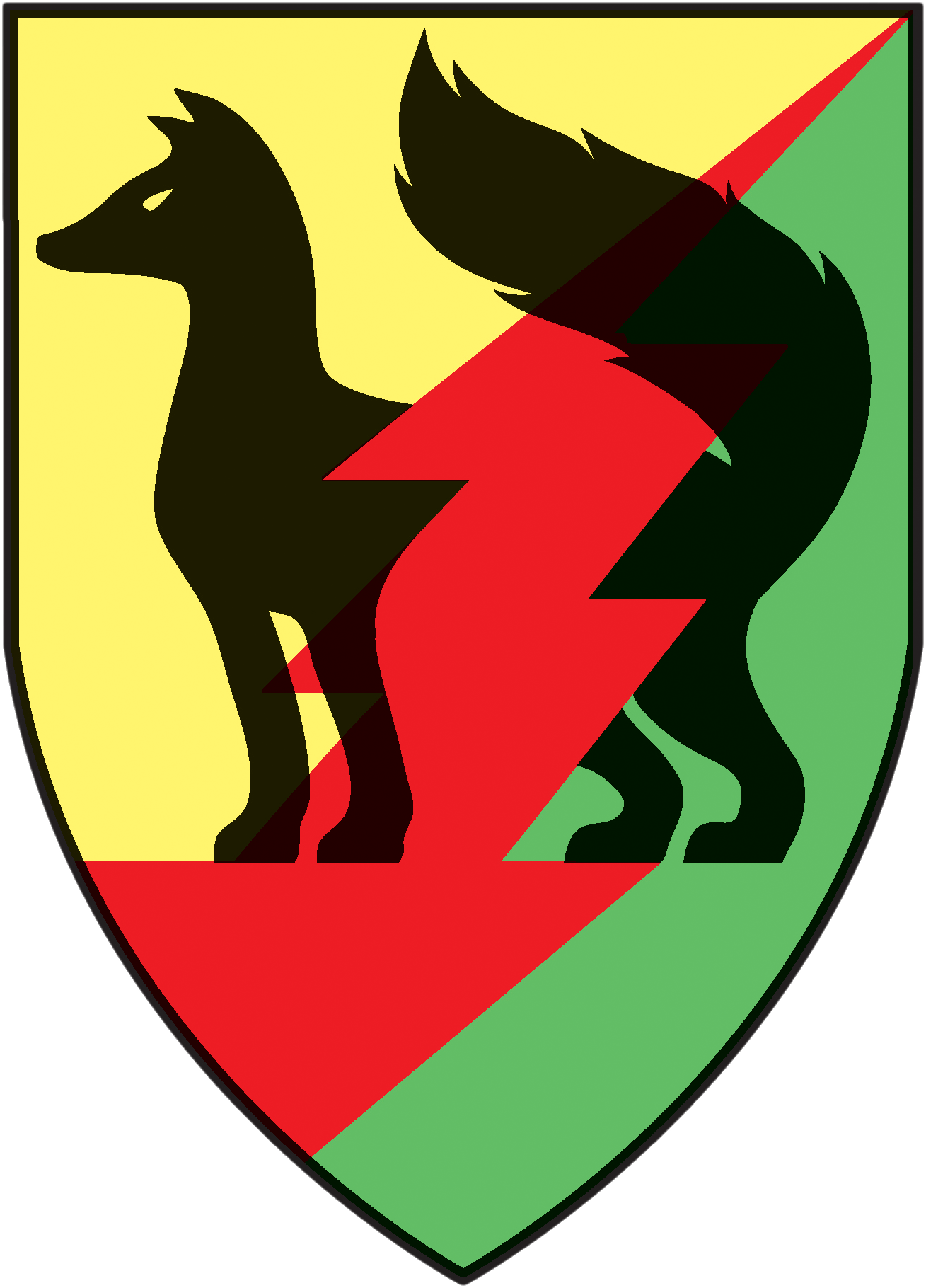
143d "Fire Fox" "Gaza" Division

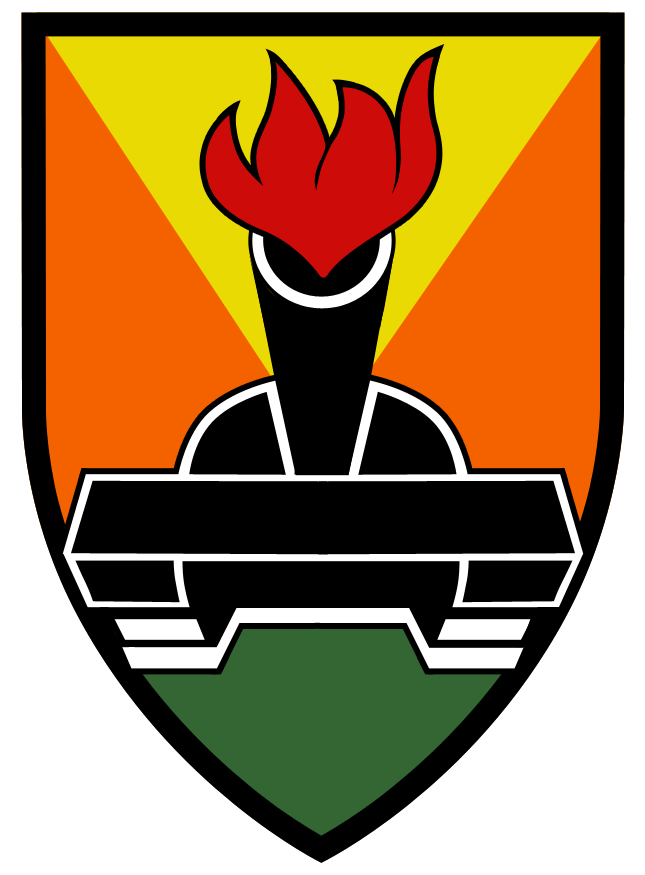
162d "Steel" Armor Division

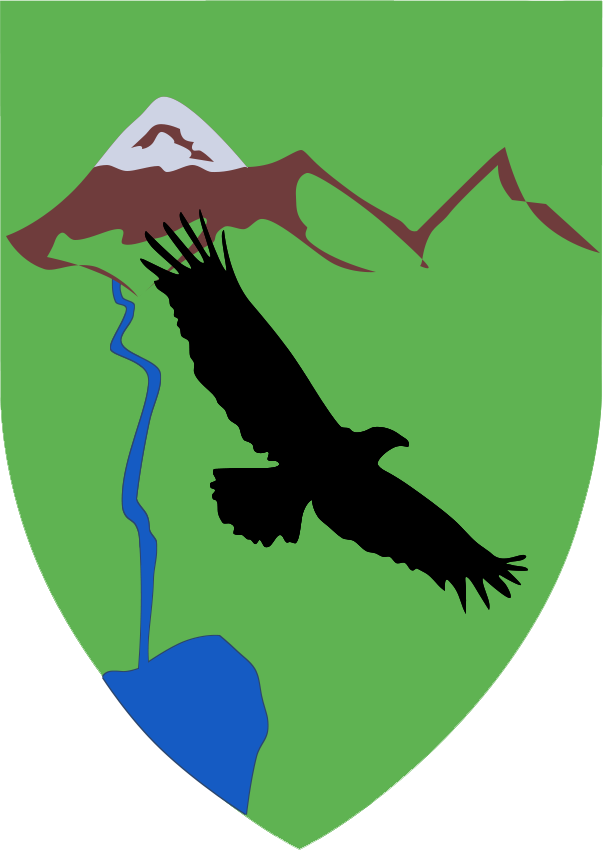
210th "Bashan" Division [Formerly 339th Division]

252d "Sinai" Armor" Division

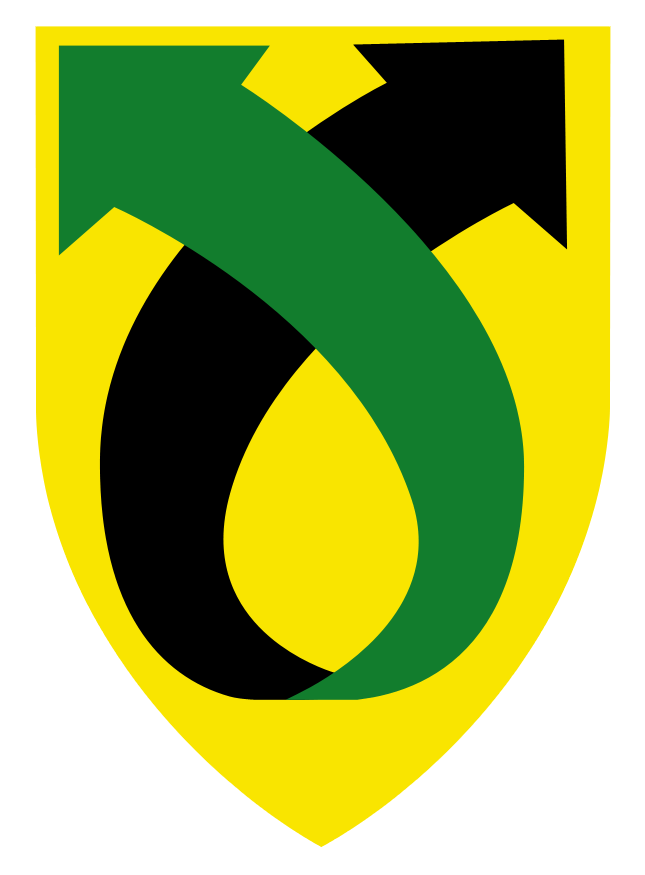
340th "IDan" Armor Division [Formerly 880th Division]

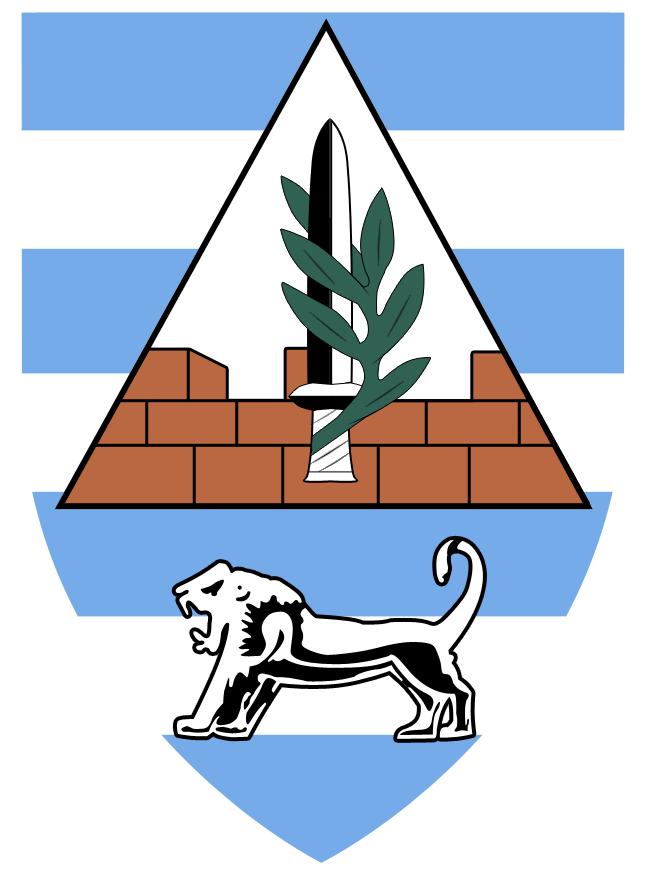
877th Judea and Samaria Division
