= Six-Day War order of battle =

This is the order of battle for the Six-Day War between Israeli forces and Arab forces which consisted of Syrian, Egyptian, and Jordanian military forces. The war took place on June 5–10, 1967.

== Israeli Defence Forces ==
On full mobilisation, the Israeli Army comprised some 250,000 men of whom almost three-quarters were reservists and one-quarter conscripts. Out of its 25 brigades, nine were armoured, two were fully mechanised, and ten were infantry, some partly mechanised, as well as their paratroop brigades which also acted as elite assault troops. The brigades were assigned to six ugdas, or division-size task forces, whose composition varied according to their assigned mission and geographical area.

Minister of Defense – General Moshe Dayan

Chief of Staff – Lieutenant General Yitzhak Rabin

=== Northern Command ===
Brigadier General David Elazar

1st Golani Infantry Brigade – Colonel Yonah Efrat
2nd Carmeli Infantry Brigade
3rd Alexandroni Infantry Brigade
37th Armoured Brigade
45th Armoured Brigade

Reinforcements:

8th Armoured Brigade – Colonel Avraham Mandler (from Southern Command)
55th Paratroopers Brigade – Colonel Mordechai Gur (from June 7 onward)

=== Central Command ===
Brigadier General Uzi Narkiss

4th Kiryati Reserve Infantry Brigade
5th HaSharon Reserve Infantry Brigade
16th Etzioni Jerusalem Infantry Brigade

Ugda Peled (from Northern Command)

9th Oded Reserve Infantry Brigade (Central Command)
37th Armoured Brigade
45th Armoured Brigade

Attached:

10th Harel Mechanised Brigade (from GHQ Reserve) – Colonel Uri Ben-Ari
55th Paratroopers Brigade – Colonel Mordechai Gur (from Southern Command)

=== Southern Command ===
Brigadier General Yeshayahu Gavish

84th Armoured Division – Brigadier General Israel Tal

7th Armoured Brigade – Colonel Shmuel Gonen
60th Armoured Brigade – Colonel Menachem Aviram
202nd Paratroop Brigade – Colonel Rafael Eitan
Recce Task Force – Colonel Uri Baron
Granit Task Force – Lieutenant Colonel Yisrael Granit
46th Tank Battalion – Lieutenant Uri Baron
215th Artillery Regiment

31st Armoured Division – Brigadier General Avraham Yoffe

200th Armoured Brigade – Colonel Yissacher Shadmi
520th Armoured Brigade – Colonel Elhanan Sela

38th Armoured Division – Brigadier General Ariel Sharon

14th Armoured Brigade – Colonel Mordechai Zippori
99th Infantry Brigade – Colonel Yekutiel Adam
80th Paratroop Brigade – Colonel Dani Matt
214th Artillery Regiment
226th Tank Batalion

35th Paratroopers Brigade – Colonel Aharon Davidi
40th Artillery Battalion
11th Infantry Brigade – Colonel Yehuda Reshef

== Syrian Army ==
The Syrian Army numbered 63,000. The field fortifications were held by eight brigades of which five were infantry brigades, each with an attached tank battalion of T-34/85s and SU-100 self-propelled guns, holding the first two lines and three armoured and mechanised brigades along and behind the third line. In addition there were four reserve infantry brigades deployed between Damascus and Kuneitra, as well as seven battalions of the National Guard militia that were deployed to bolster the defensive lines. These forces were divided into 'Group Brigades' in Syrian terminology although this was an administrative convenience rather than a tactical deployment.

Minister of Defense – Hafez al-Assad

Army Chief of Staff – Ahmad Suwaydani

12th Group Brigade

11th Infantry Brigade
132nd Reserve Infantry Brigade
80th Reserve Infantry Brigade
44th Armoured Brigade

35th Group Brigade

8th Infantry Brigade
19th Infantry Brigade
32nd Infantry Brigade
17th Mechanised Infantry Brigade

42nd Group Brigade

25th Infantry Brigade
50th Reserve Infantry Brigade
60th Reserve Infantry Brigade
14th Armoured Brigade

== Royal Jordanian Army ==
The 55,000-man Jordanian Army was divided into the Eastern and Western commands, with the division marked by the Jordan River. In June 1967, the bulk of the Jordanian forces was deployed in the West Bank in two main areas: in Samaria in the north, based in and around the towns of Jenin and Nablus and in the south in the area from Ramallah through Jerusalem down to Hebron.

Chief of Staff – Amer Khammash

Western Command

1st 'Princess Alia' Infantry Brigade
2nd 'Hashimi' Infantry Brigade
3rd 'King Talal' Infantry Brigade
6th 'Qadisiya' Infantry Brigade
25th 'Khalid Ibn Walid' Infantry Brigade
27th 'Imam Ali' Infantry Brigade
29th 'Hittin' Infantry Brigade
40th Armoured Brigade
60th Armoured Brigade

Eastern Command

Hussein Ali Infantry Brigade
Yarmouk Infantry Brigade
Royal Guard Brigade

== Egyptian Army ==
With an official strength of 210,000 men in June 1967, the Egyptian Army had some 100,000 troops in the Sinai Peninsula and approximately 50,000 in Yemen with the remainder stationed to the west of the Suez Canal to protect Cairo. The Sinai Front Command comprised some six divisions with 930 tanks, 200 assault guns, and 900 artillery pieces.

UAR Commander-in-Chief – Field Marshal Abdul Hakim Amer

Minister of Defense – Shams Badran

Army Chief of Staff – Mohamed Fawzi

Air Force Commander-in-Chief – Mohamed Sedky Mahmoud

Sinai Front Command – General Abd el Mushin Murtagi

Field commander – Lieutenant General Sallah el din Mohsen

2nd Infantry Division – Major General Sadi Naguib
3rd Infantry Division – Major General Osman Nasser
4th Armoured Division – Major General Sidki el Ghoul
Task Force Shazli – Major General Saad el-Shazly
6th Mechanised Division – Major General Abd el Kader Hassan
7th Infantry Division – Major General Abd el Aziz Soliman
20th PLA Division Gaza – Major General Mohammed Abd el Moneim Hasni
Infantry Brigade (Ind) – Brigadier Mohammed Abd el Moneim Khalil
1st Armoured Brigade – Brigadier Hussein Abd el Nataf
125th Armoured Brigade – Brigadier Ahmed El-Naby
