= 4th Armoured Brigade =

4th Armoured Brigade may refer to:

- 4th Armoured Brigade (Australia)
- 4th Armored Brigade "Kiryati", Israel
- 4th Armored Brigade (People's Republic of China)
- 4th Armoured Brigade (United Kingdom)
- 4th Brigade Combat Team, 1st Armored Division, United States
- 4th Canadian Armoured Brigade
- 4th New Zealand Armoured Brigade
- 4th Tank Brigade (Ukraine)

== See also ==
- 4th Brigade (disambiguation)
