= Israeli Ground Forces =

Land service branch of the Israel Defense Forces

- זְרוֹעַ הַיַּבָּשָׁה
- Emblem of the Israeli Ground Forces
- Founded: 26 May 1948; 78 years ago
- Country: Israel
- Type: Army
- Role: Land warfare
- Size: 126,000 active; 400,000 reserve
- Part of: Israel Defense Forces
- Headquarters: Bar-Lev Camp
- Nickname: The Greens (הַיְּרוּקִים)
- Equipment: List of equipment
- Engagements: History of the Israel Defense Forces; List of the Israel Defense Forces operations
- Website: Official website

Commanders
- Commander of the Ground Forces: Major General Nadav Lotan

Insignia
- Flag

The Israeli Ground Forces (Hebrew: זְרוֹעַ הַיַּבָּשָׁה, romanized: z'róa hibshá, lit. 'The Land Arm') are the army of the Israel Defense Forces (IDF). The current commander of the ground forces is Major General Nadav Lotan.

An order from Defense Minister David Ben-Gurion on 26 May 1948 officially set up the Israel Defense Forces as a conscript army formed out of the paramilitary group Haganah, incorporating the militant groups Irgun and Lehi. The Ground Forces have served in all the country's major military operations—including the 1948 Arab–Israeli War, 1956 Suez Crisis, 1967 Six-Day War, 1973 Yom Kippur War, 1976 Operation Entebbe, 1982 Lebanon War, 1987–1993 First Intifada, 2000–2005 Second Intifada, 2006 Lebanon War, and the Gaza War (2008–09). While originally the IDF operated on three fronts—against Lebanon and Syria in the north, Jordan and Iraq in the east, and Egypt in the south—after the 1979 Egyptian–Israeli Peace Treaty, it has concentrated in southern Lebanon and the Palestinian territories, including the First and the Second Intifada.

The Ground Forces uses several technologies developed in Israel such as the Merkava main battle tank, Achzarit armoured personnel carrier, the Iron Dome missile defense system, Trophy active protection system for vehicles, and the Galil and Tavor assault rifles. The Uzi submachine gun was invented in Israel and used by the Ground Forces until December 2003, ending a service that began in 1954. Since 1967, the IDF has had close military relations with the United States, including development cooperation, such as on the THEL laser defense system, and the Arrow missile defense system.

== History ==
The IDF traces its roots to Jewish paramilitary organizations in the New Yishuv, starting with the Second Aliyah (1904 to 1914). The first such organization was Bar-Giora, founded in September 1907. Bar-Giora was transformed into Hashomer in April 1909, which operated until the British Mandate of Palestine came into being in 1920. Hashomer was an elitist organization with narrow scope, and was mainly created to protect against criminal gangs seeking to steal property. The Zion Mule Corps and the Jewish Legion, both part of the British Army of World War I, further bolstered the Yishuv with military experience and manpower, forming the basis for later paramilitary forces.

After the 1920 Palestine riots against Jews in April 1920, the Yishuv leadership realised the need for a nationwide underground defense organization, and the Haganah was founded in June of the same year. The Haganah became a full-scale defense force after the 1936–1939 Arab revolt in Palestine with an organized structure, consisting of three main units—the Field Corps, Guard Corps, and the Palmach. During World War II, many Jews from the Yishuv enlisted in the British Armed Forces. The majority of them served in the British Army, culminating in the formation of the Jewish Brigade. These would eventually form the backbone of the Israel Defense Forces, and provide it with its initial manpower and doctrine.

Following Israel's Declaration of Independence, prime minister and defense minister David Ben-Gurion issued an order for the formation of the Israel Defense Forces on 26 May 1948. Although Ben-Gurion had no legal authority to issue such an order, the order was made legal by the cabinet on 31 May. The same order called for the disbandment of all other Jewish armed forces. The two other Jewish underground organizations, Irgun and Lehi, agreed to join the IDF if they would be able to form independent units and agreed not to make independent arms purchases.

This was the background for the Altalena Affair, a confrontation surrounding weapons purchased by the Irgun resulting in a standoff between Irgun members and the newly created IDF. The affair came to an end when Altalena, the ship carrying the arms, was shelled by the IDF. Following the affair, all independent Irgun and Lehi units were either disbanded or merged into the IDF. The Palmach, a leading component of the Haganah, also joined the IDF with provisions. Ben Gurion responded by disbanding its staff in 1949, after which many senior Palmach officers retired, notably its first commander, Yitzhak Sadeh.

The new army organized itself when the 1947–48 Civil War in Mandatory Palestine escalated into the 1948 Arab–Israeli War, which saw neighbouring Arab states attack. Twelve infantry and armored brigades formed: Golani, Carmeli, Alexandroni, Kiryati, Givati, Etzioni, the 7th, and 8th armored brigades, Oded, Harel, Yiftach, and Negev. After the war, some of the brigades were converted to reserve units, and others were disbanded. Directorates and corps were created from corps and services in the Haganah. This basic structure in the IDF still exists today.

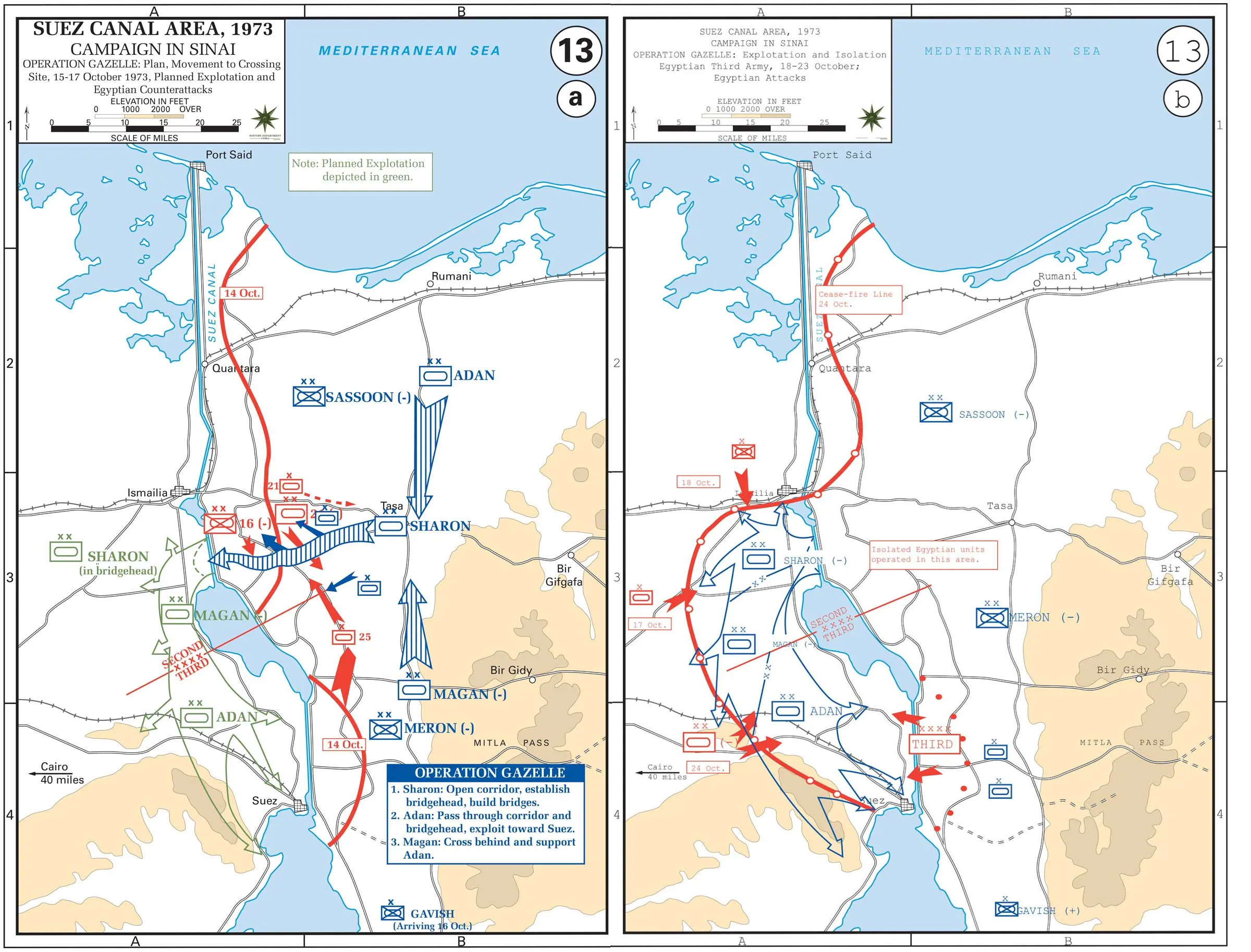
Operation Gazelle, Israel's ground maneuver, encircles the Egyptian Third Army, October 1973.

Immediately after the 1948 war, the Israel-Palestinian conflict shifted to a low intensity conflict between the IDF and Palestinian fedayeen. In the 1956 Suez Crisis, the IDF's first serious test of strength after 1949, the new army captured the Sinai Peninsula from Egypt, which was later returned. In the 1967 Six-Day War, Israel conquered the Sinai Peninsula, Gaza Strip, West Bank (including East Jerusalem) and Golan Heights from the surrounding Arab states, changing the balance of power in the region as well as the role of the IDF. In the following years leading up to the Yom Kippur War, the IDF fought in the War of Attrition against Egypt in the Sinai and a border war against the Palestine Liberation Organization (PLO) in Jordan, culminating in the Battle of Karameh.

The surprise of the Yom Kippur War and its aftermath completely changed the IDF's procedures and approach to warfare. Organizational changes were made and more time was dedicated to training for conventional warfare. In the following years the army's role slowly shifted again to low-intensity conflict, urban warfare and counter-terrorism. An example of the latter was the successful 1976 Operation Entebbe commando raid to free hijacked airline passengers being held captive in Uganda. During this era, the IDF also mounted a successful bombing mission in Iraq to destroy its nuclear reactor.

It was involved in the Lebanese Civil War, initiating Operation Litani and later the 1982 Lebanon War, where the IDF ousted Palestinian guerilla organizations from Lebanon. Palestinian militancy has been the main focus of the IDF ever since, especially during the First and Second Intifadas, Operation Defensive Shield, the Gaza War, Operation Pillar of Defense, and Operation Protective Edge, causing the IDF to change many of its values and publish the IDF Spirit. The Lebanese Shia organization Hezbollah has also been a growing threat, against which the IDF fought an asymmetric conflict between 1982 and 2000, as well as a full-scale war in 2006.

== Organization ==
The IDF is an integrated military force, without a separate ground arm from 1948 to 1998, when the Ground Forces were formally brought under a single command now known as GOC Army Headquarters (Hebrew: מפקדת זרוע היבשה, Mifkedet Zro'a HaYabasha, abbreviated Mazi). The Ground Forces are not yet a formal arm of the IDF, in the same way that the Israeli Air Force and Israeli Navy are.

=== Structure ===
The Ground Forces include the following Corps:

- Infantry Corps
  - 1st Golani Brigade
  - 35th Paratroopers Brigade
  - 84th Nahal Brigade
  - 89th Commando Brigade
  - 900th Kfir Brigade
  - 933rd Givati Brigade
  - 2nd Carmeli (Reserve) Infantry Brigade
  - 3rd Alexandroni (Reserve) Infantry Brigade
  - 5th Sharon (Reserve) Infantry Brigade
  - 6th Etzioni (Reserve) Infantry Brigade
  - 9th Oded (Reserve) Infantry Brigade
  - 11th Yiftah (Reserve) Infantry Brigade
  - 12th Negev (Reserve) Infantry Brigade
  - 16th Jerusalem (Reserve) Infantry Brigade
  - 55th Hod Ha-Hanit (Reserve) Paratroopers Brigade
  - 226th (Reserve) Paratroopers Brigade
  - 228th (Reserve) Infantry Brigade
  - 551st Hetzei Ha-Esh (Reserve) Paratroopers Brigade
  - 646th Sky Fox (Reserve) Paratroopers Brigade
  - HeHarim (Mountain) Brigade
- Armored Corps
  - 7th Sa'ar Armored Brigade
  - 188th Barak Armored Brigade
  - 401st Ikvot HaBarzel Armored Brigade
  - 460th Sons of Light Armored Brigade
  - 4th Kiryati (Reserve) Armored Brigade
  - 8th (Reserve) Armored Brigade
  - 10th Harel (Reserve) Armored Brigade
  - 14th Machatz (Reserve) Armored Brigade
  - 37th Ram (Reserve) Armored Brigade
  - 205th Iron Fist (Reserve) Armored Brigade
  - 263rd Chariots of Fire (Reserve) Armored Brigade
  - 679th Yiftah (Reserve) Armored Brigade
  - 847th Chariots of Steel (Reserve) Armor Brigade
- Artillery Corps
  - 214th David's Sling Artillery Regiment
  - 215th Pillar of Fire Artillery Regiment
  - 282nd Golan Artillery Regiment
  - 209th Kadion (Reserve) Artillery Regiment
  - 213th Revival (Reserve) Artillery Regiment
  - 454th Tabor (Reserve) Artillery Regiment
  - 7338th (Reserve) Artillery Regiment
  - 425th Fire Flame Artillery Training Regiment
- Combat Engineering Corps
- Combat Intelligence Collection Corps

=== Units ===
Ground Forces
| Hebrew | English | Commander |
|---|---|---|
| חֻלְיָה; Hulya | Fire Team | Mashak Hulya ("Fire Team Leader"); Corporal or Sergeant |
| כִּתָּה; Kita | Squad / Section | Mashak Kita ("Squad / Section Leader"); Staff Sergeant |
| מַחְלָקָה; Mahlaka | Platoon | Mefaked Mahlaka ("Platoon Commander"); Lieutenant |
| פְּלֻגָּה; Pluga | Company | Mefaked Pluga ("Company Commander"); Captain |
| סוֹלְלָה; Solela | Artillery Battery | Captain or Major |
| סַיֶּרֶת; Sayeret | Reconnaissance | Captain or Major |
| גְּדוּד; Gdud | Battalion | Lieutenant-Colonel |
| חֲטִיבָה; Hativa | Brigade | Colonel |
| אֻגְדָּה; Ugda | Division | (1948–1967) Major-General (1968–Present) Brigadier-General |
| גַּיִס; Gayis | Army | Major-General |

== Ranks, uniforms and insignia ==
=== Ranks ===
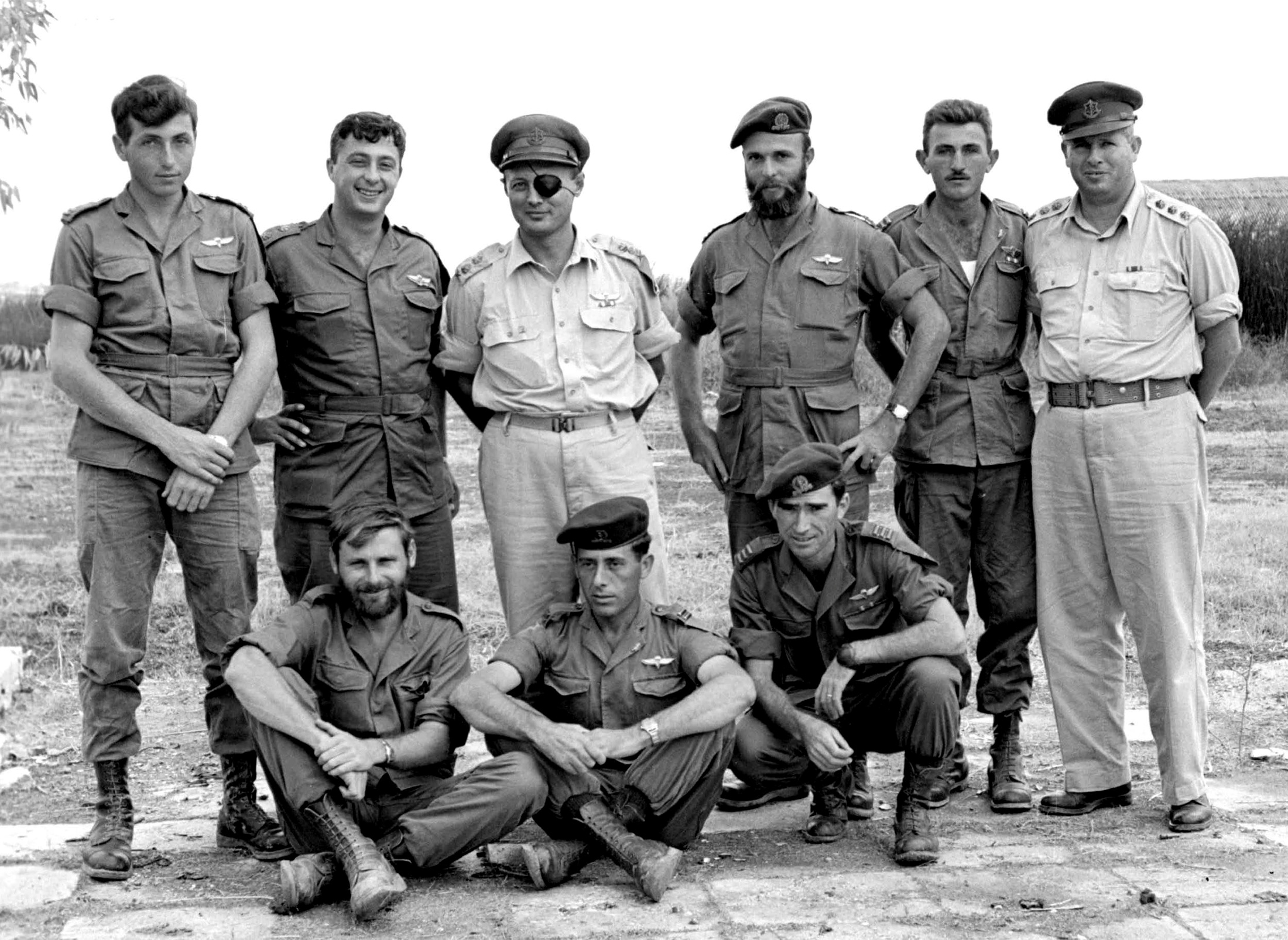
Israeli officers of the Paratrooper Battalion 890 in 1955 with Moshe Dayan (standing, third from the left). Ariel Sharon is standing, second from the left and commando Meir Har Zion is standing furthest left.

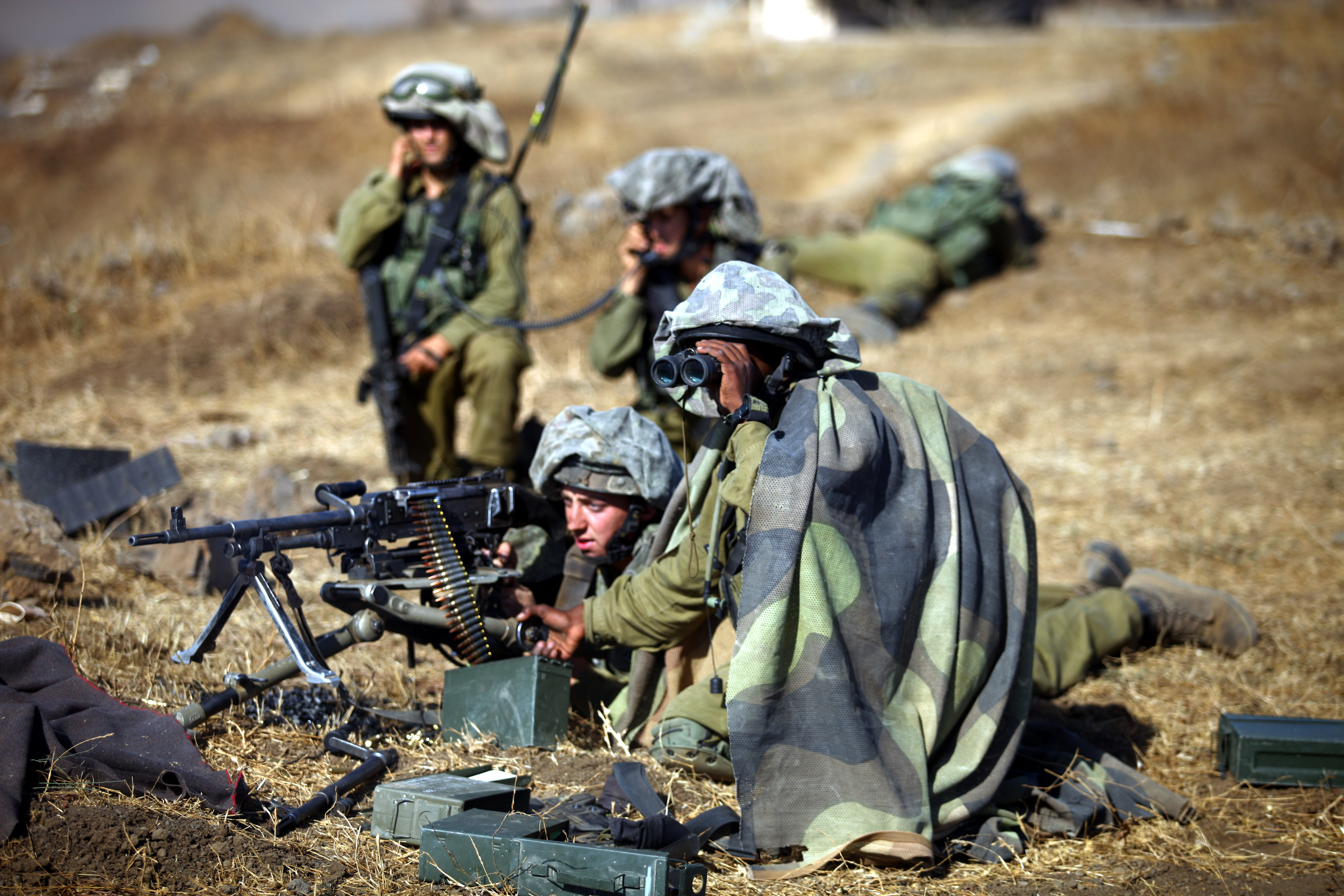
Soldiers of the Golani Brigade on the Golan Heights

Unlike most militaries, the IDF uses the same rank names in all corps, including the air force and navy. For ground forces' officers, rank insignia are brass on a red background. Officer insignia are worn on epaulets on top of both shoulders. Insignia distinctive to each corps are worn on the cap.

Enlisted grades wear rank insignia on the sleeve, halfway between the shoulder and the elbow. For the ground forces, the insignia are white with blue interwoven threads backed with the appropriate corps color.

From the formation of the IDF until the late 1980s, sergeant major was a particularly important warrant officer rank, in line with usage in other armies. In the 1980s and 1990s the proliferating ranks of sergeant major became devalued, and now all professional non-commissioned officer ranks are a variation on sergeant major (rav samal) with the exception of rav nagad.

==== Commissioned officer ranks ====
The rank insignia of commissioned officers.

| Rank group | General / flag officers | | | Senior officers | | | Junior officers |
|---|---|---|---|---|---|---|---|---|---|
| Israeli Ground Forces |
| Israeli Ground Forces | רב-אלוף; Rav aluf | אלוף; Aluf | תת-אלוף; Tat aluf | אלוף משנה; Aluf mishne | סגן-אלוף; Sgan aluf | רב סרן; Rav seren | סרן; Seren | סגן; Segen | סגן-משנה; Segen mishne |

==== Other ranks ====
The rank insignia of non-commissioned officers and enlisted personnel.

| Rank group | Senior NCOs | | | | | | | Junior NCOs | Enlisted |
|---|---|---|---|---|---|---|---|---|---|
| Israeli Ground Forces | | | | | | | | | No insignia |
| Israeli Ground Forces | רב-נגד; Rav nagad | רב-סמל בכיר; Rav samal bakhír | רב-סמל מתקדם; Rav samal mitkadem | רב-סמל ראשון; Rav samal rishon | רב-סמל; Rav samal | סמל ראשון; Samal rishon | סמל; Samal | רב טוראי; Rav turai | טוראי; Turai |

=== Uniforms ===
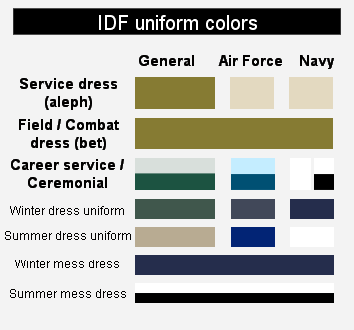
IDF uniform colours

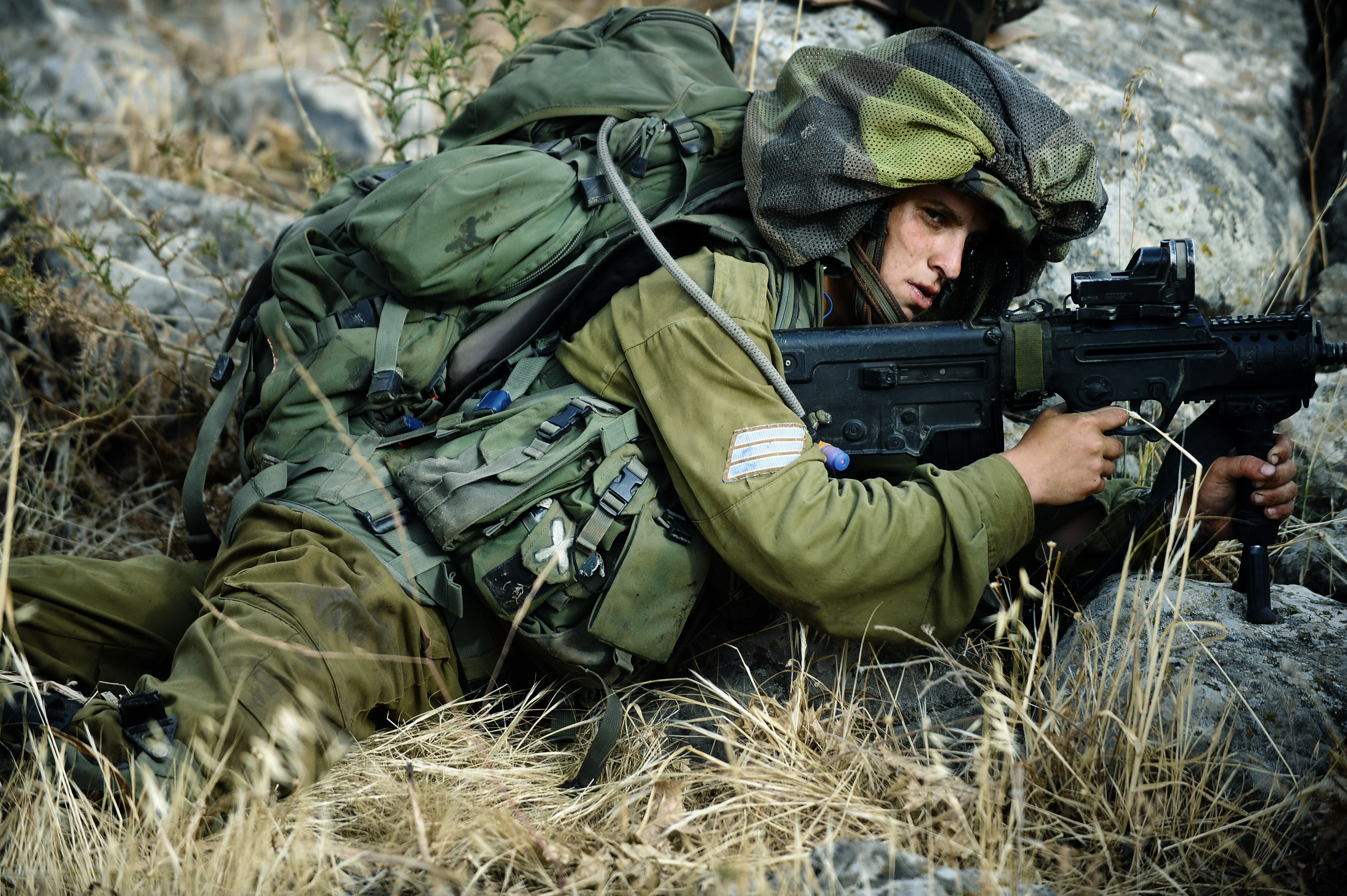
Nahal Brigade soldier with full combat gear

The Israel Defense Forces has several types of uniforms:

- Service dress (מדי אלף Madei Alef – Uniform "A") – the everyday uniform, worn by everybody.
- Field dress ( מדי ב Madei Bet – Uniform "B") – worn into combat, training, work on base.

The first two resemble each other but the Madei Alef is made of higher quality materials in a golden-olive while the madei bet is in olive drab. The dress uniforms may also exhibit a surface shine

- Officers / Ceremonial dress (מדי שרד madei srad) – worn by officers, or during special events/ceremonies.
- Dress uniform and mess dress – worn only abroad. There are several dress uniforms depending on the season and the branch.

The service uniform for all ground forces personnel is olive green. The uniforms consist of a two-pocket shirt, combat trousers, sweater, jacket or blouse, and shoes or boots. The green fatigues are the same for winter and summer and heavy winter gear is issued as needed. Women's dress parallels the men's but may substitute a skirt for the trousers.

Headgear included a service cap for dress and semi-dress and a field cap or "Kova raful" bush hat worn with fatigues. IDF personnel generally wear berets in lieu of the service cap and there are many beret colors issued to IDF personnel. Paratroopers are issued a maroon beret, Golani brown, Givati purple, Nahal lime green, Kfir camouflage, Combat Engineers gray. Other beret colors are: black for armored corps, turquoise for artillery personnel. For all other ground personnel, except combat units, the beret for men was green and for women, black.

In combat uniforms the Orlite helmet has replaced the British Brodie helmet Mark II/Mark III, RAC Mk II modified helmet with chin web jump harness used by paratroopers and similar to the HSAT Mk II/Mk III paratrooper helmets, US M1 helmet, and French Modèle 1951 helmet – previously worn by Israeli infantry and airborne troops from the late 1940s to the mid-1970s and early 1980s.

Some corps or units have small variations in their uniforms – for instance, military policemen wear a white belt and police hat. Paratroopers are issued a four pocket tunic (yarkit/yerkit) worn untucked with a pistol belt cinched tight around the waist over the shirt.

Most IDF soldiers are issued black leather combat boots, certain units issue reddish-brown leather boots for historical reasons — the paratroopers, combat medics, Nahal and Kfir Brigades, as well as some Special Forces units (Sayeret Matkal, Oketz, Duvdevan, Maglan, and the Counter-Terror School). Women were formerly issued sandals, but this practice has ceased.

=== Insignia ===
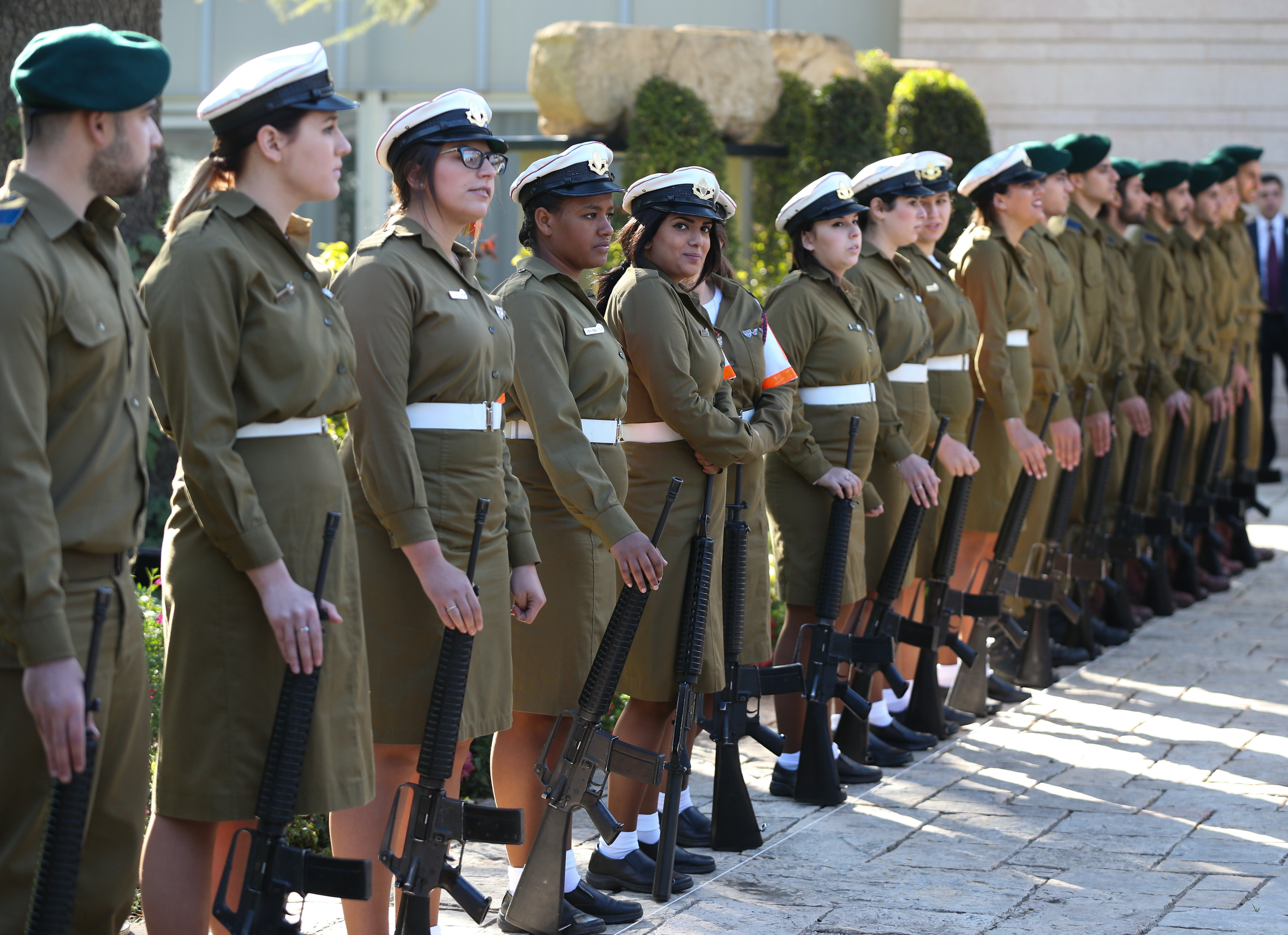
IDF female Military Police wearing skirts with their White caps and belts

IDF soldiers have three types of insignia, other than rank insignia, which identify their corps, specific unit, and position.

A pin attached to the beret identifies a soldier's corps. Soldiers serving in staffs above corps level are often identified by the General Corps pin, despite not officially belonging to it, or the pin of a related corps. New recruits undergoing tironut (basic training) do not have a pin. Beret colors are also often indicative of the soldier's corps. Most non-combat corps do not have their own beret, and sometimes wear the color of the corps to which the post they're stationed in belongs. Individual units are identified by a shoulder tag attached to the left shoulder strap. Most units in the IDF have their own tags, although those that do not, generally use tags identical to their command's tag (corps, directorate, or regional command).

While one cannot always identify the position/job of a soldier, two optional factors help make this identification: an aiguillette attached to the left shoulder strap and shirt pocket, and a pin indicating the soldier's work type, usually given by a professional course. Other pins may indicate the corps or additional courses taken. An optional battle pin indicates a war that a soldier has fought in.

== Service ==
The military service is held in three different tracks:

- Regular service (שירות חובה): mandatory military service which is held according to the Israeli security service law.
- Permanent service (שירות קבע): military service which is held as part of a contractual agreement between the IDF and the permanent position-holder.
- Reserve service (שירות מילואים): a military service in which citizens are called for active duty of at most a month every year, in accordance with the Reserve Service Law, for training and ongoing military activities and especially for the purpose of increasing the military forces in case of a war.

Sometimes the IDF would also hold pre-military courses (קורס קדם צבאי or קד"צ) for soon-to-be regular service soldiers.

=== Women ===
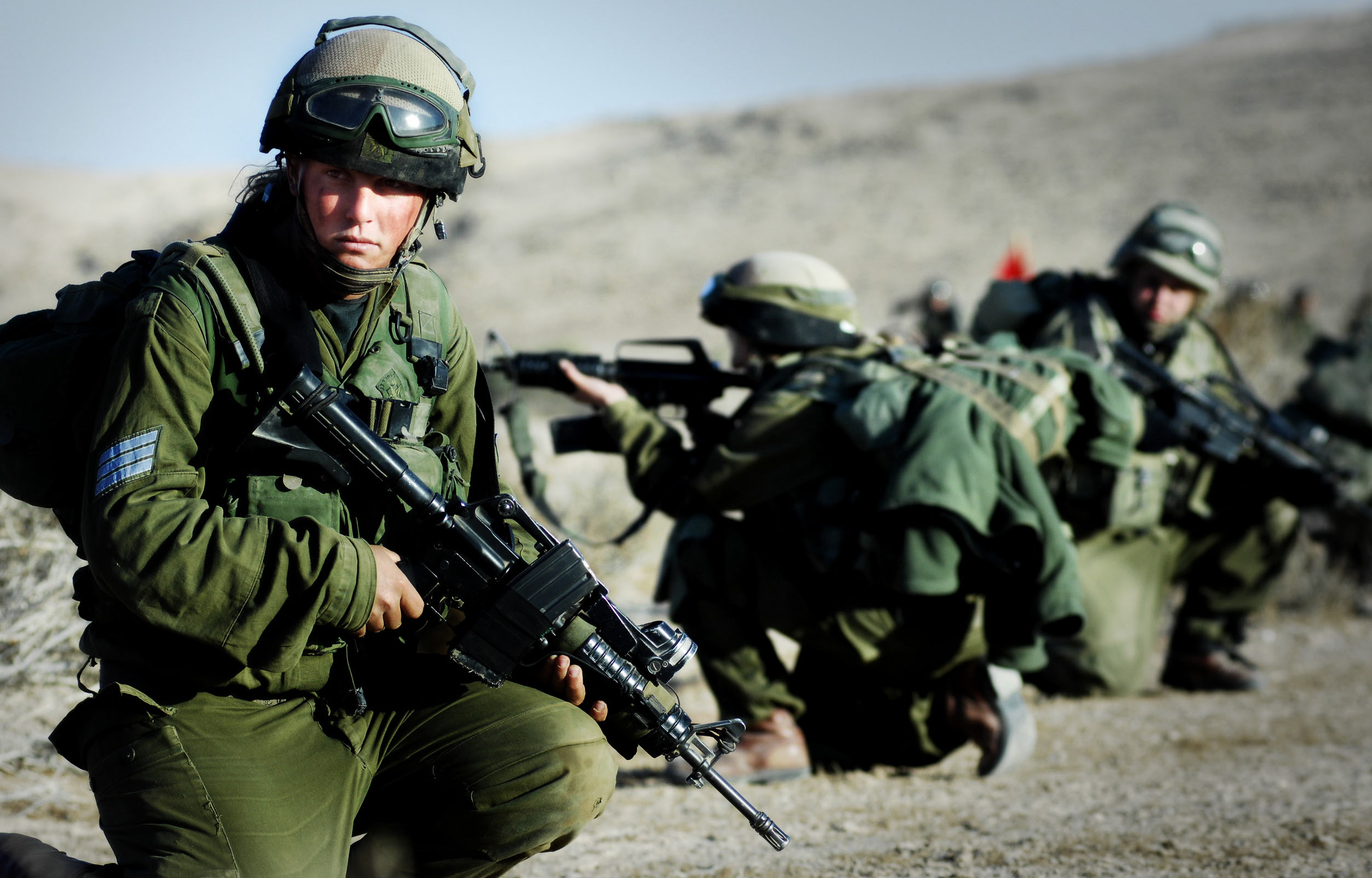
The unisex Caracal Battalion, which serves in routine security missions

Israel is one of only a few nations that conscript women or deploy them in combat roles. In practice, women can avoid conscription through a religious exemption and over a third of Israeli women do so. As of 2010, 88% of all roles in the IDF are open to female candidates, and women were found in 69% of all IDF positions.

According to the IDF, 535 female Israeli soldiers were killed in combat operations in the period 1962–2016, and dozens before then. The IDF says that fewer than 4 percent of women are in combat positions. Rather, they are concentrated in "combat-support" positions which command a lower compensation and status than combat positions.

== Mission ==
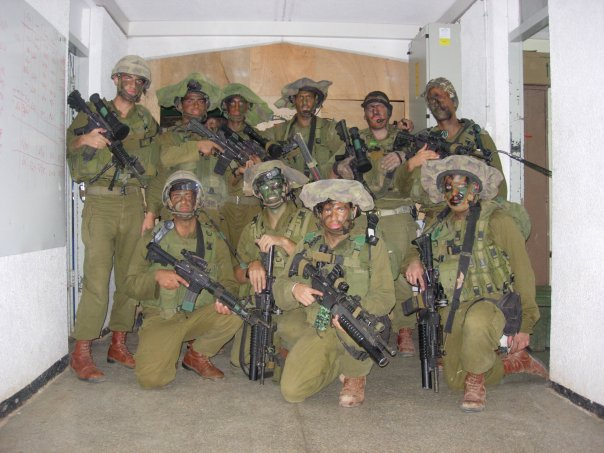
Israeli "Netzah Yehuda" recon company in full combat gear prepare for a night raid in the West Bank.

The IDF's mission is to "defend the existence, territorial integrity and sovereignty of the state of Israel. To protect the inhabitants of Israel and to combat all forms of terrorism which threaten the daily life."

The Israeli military's primary principles derive from Israel's need to combat numerically superior opponents. One such principle, is the concept that Israel cannot afford to lose a single war. The IDF believes that this is possible if it can rapidly mobilize troops to insure that they engage the enemy in enemy territory. In the 21st century, various nonconventional threats including terrorist organizations, subterranean infrastructure operated by Hamas, etc. have forced the IDF to modify its official defense doctrine.

== Field rations ==
Field rations, called manot krav, usually consist of canned tuna, sardines, beans, stuffed vine leaves, maize and fruit cocktail and bars of halva. Packets of fruit flavored drink powder are provided along with condiments like ketchup, mustard, chocolate spread and jam. Around 2010, the IDF announced that certain freeze dried MREs served in water-activated disposable heaters like goulash, turkey schwarma and meatballs would be introduced as field rations.

One staple of these rations was loof, a type of Kosher spam made from chicken or beef that was phased out around 2008. Food historian Gil Marks has written that: "Many Israeli soldiers insist that Loof uses all the parts of the cow that the hot dog manufacturers will not accept, but no one outside of the manufacturer and the kosher supervisors actually know what is inside."

== Weapons and equipment ==
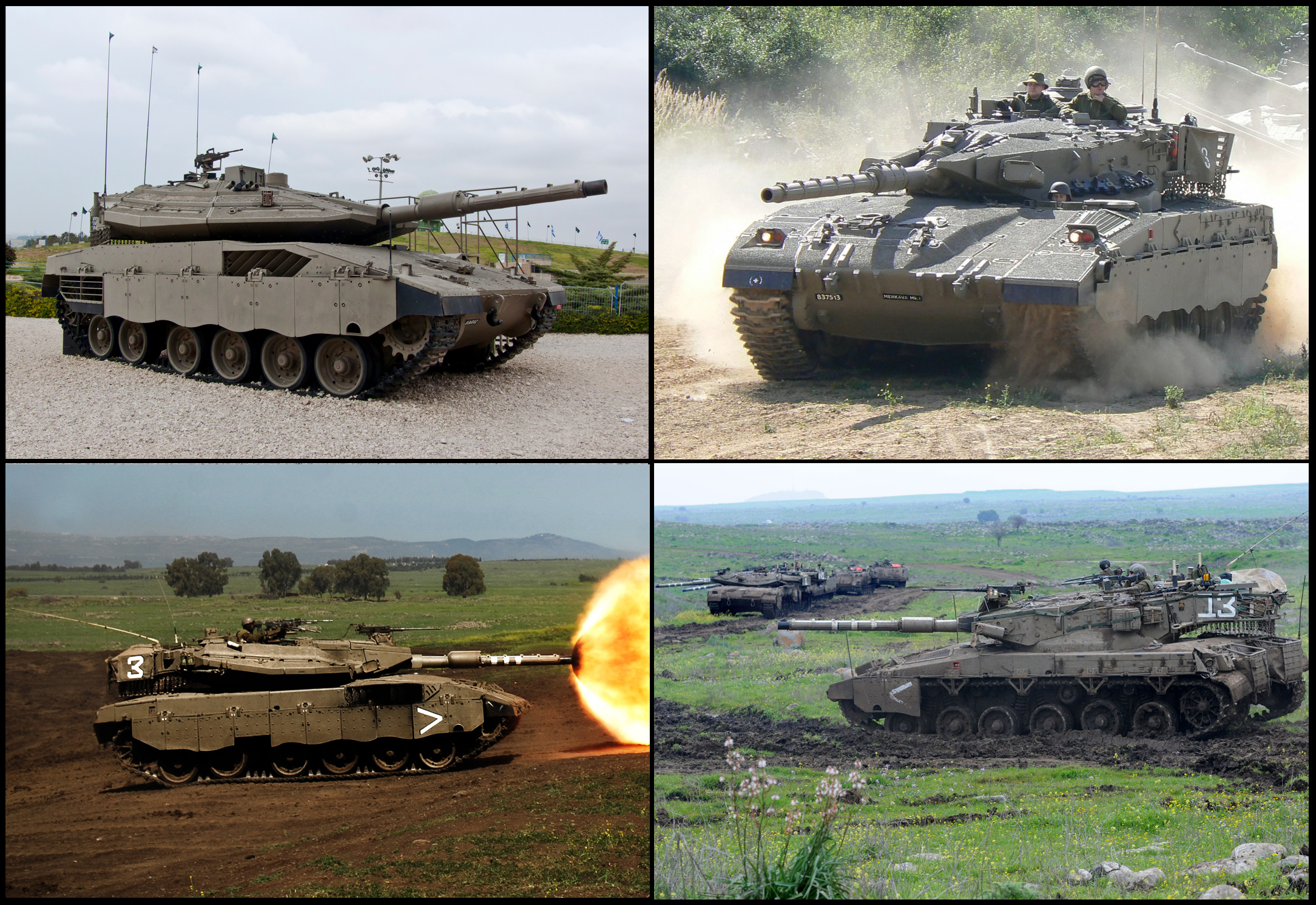
Merkava – Israeli main battle tank, with 4 generations

The Ground Forces possess various domestic and foreign weapons and computer systems. Some equipment is from the United States, modified for IDF use, such as the M4A1 and M16 assault rifles, the M24 SWS 7.62 mm bolt action sniper rifle, the SR-25 7.62 mm semi-automatic sniper rifle, and the AH-1 Cobra and AH-64D Apache attack helicopters.

Israel has a domestic arms industry, which has developed weapons and vehicles such as the Merkava battle tank series, and various small arms such as the Galil and Tavor assault rifles, and the Uzi submachine gun.

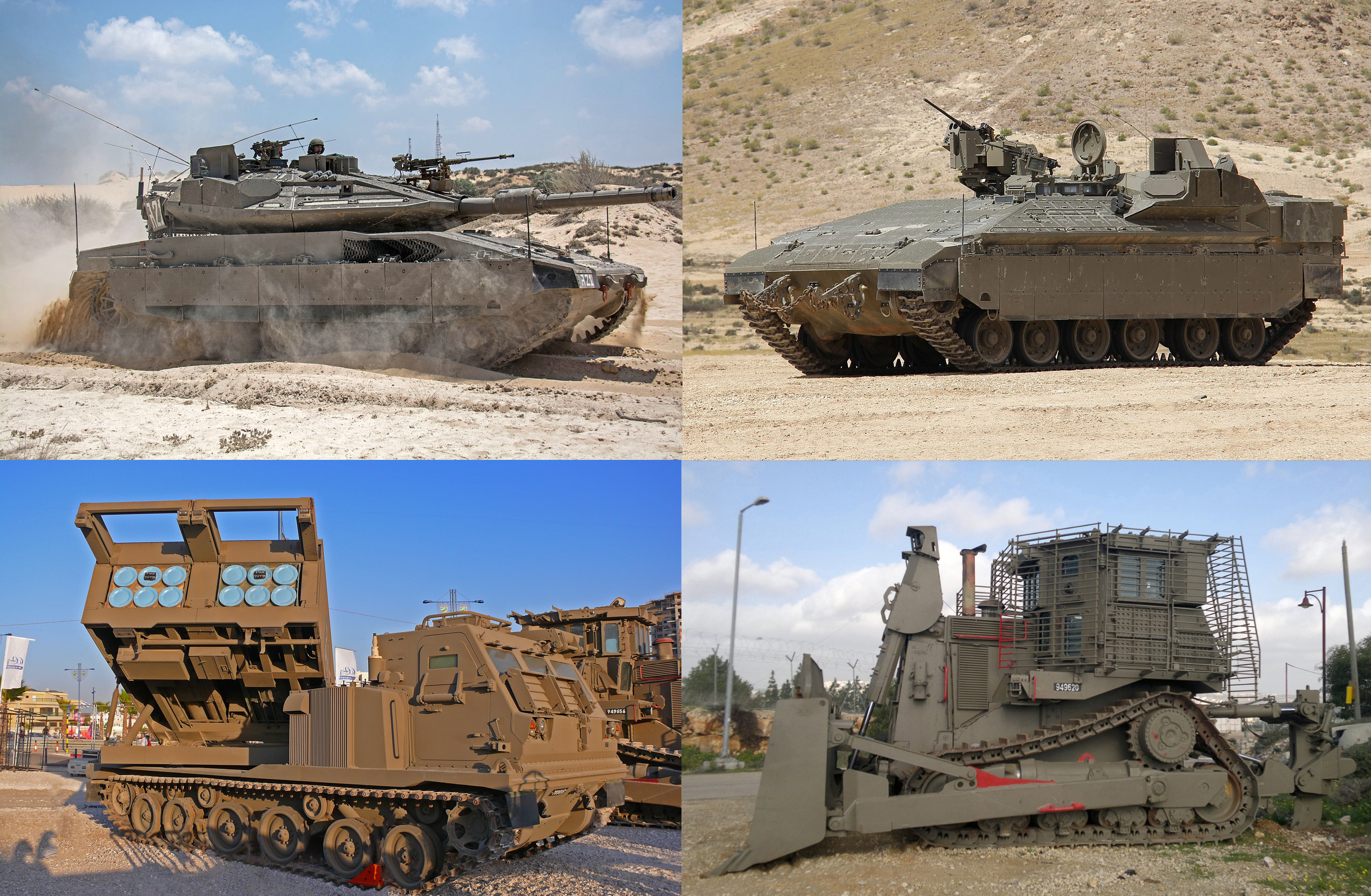
IDF's current (2017) armored fighting vehicles, clockwise: IDF Namer, IDF Caterpillar D9, M270 MLRS and Merkava Mk 4M

Israel has installed a variant of the Samson RCWS, a remote controlled weapons platform, which can include machine guns, grenade launchers, and anti-tank missiles on a remotely operated turret, in pillboxes along the Israeli Gaza Strip barrier to prevent Palestinian militants from entering its territory. Israel has developed observation balloons equipped with sophisticated cameras and surveillance systems used to thwart terror attacks from Gaza.

The Ground Forces possess advanced combat engineering equipment including the IDF Caterpillar D9 armored bulldozer, IDF Puma combat engineering vehicle, Tzefa Shiryon and CARPET minefield breaching rockets, and a variety of robots and explosive devices.

== Future ==
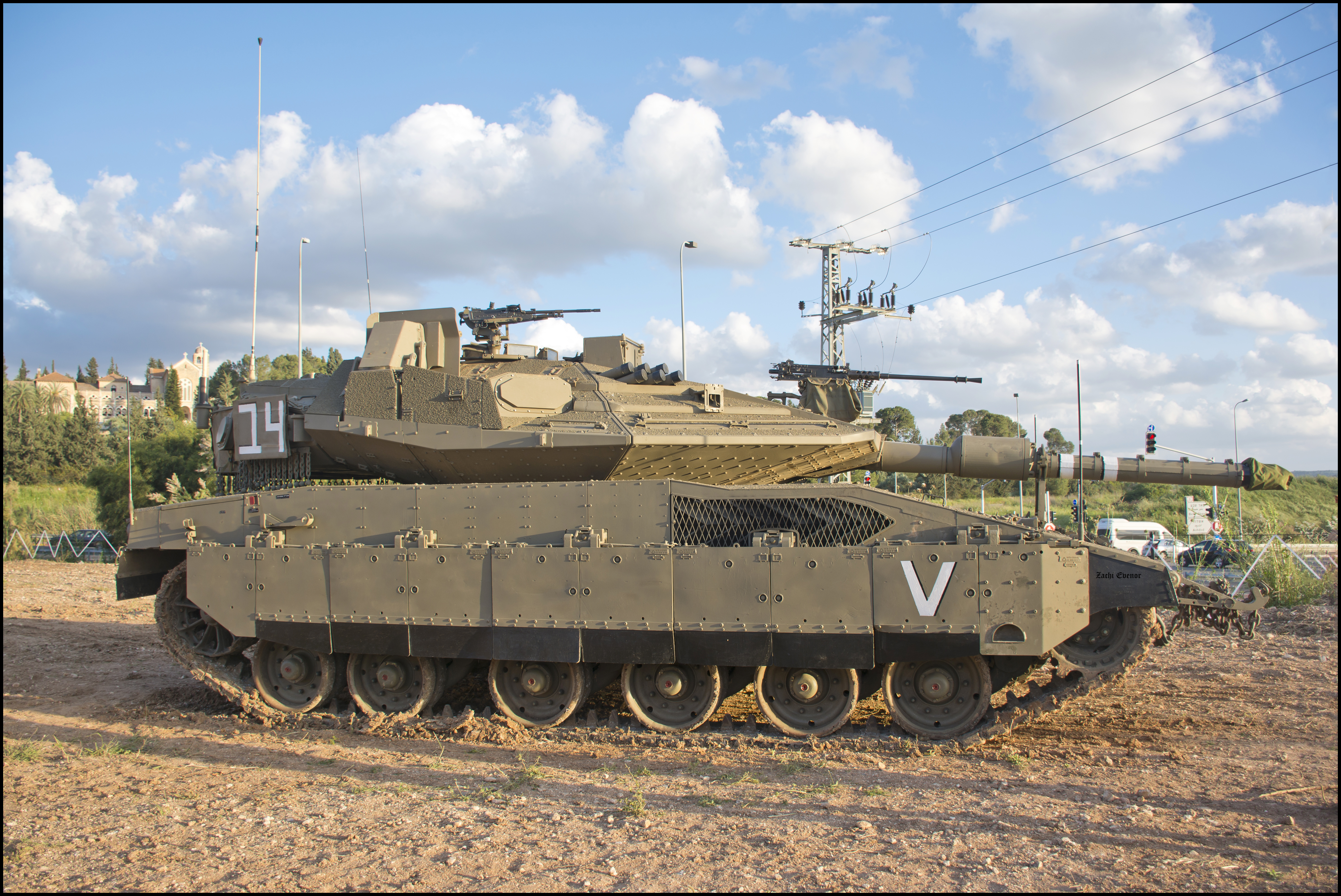
A profile of a Merkava Mk 4M tank, armed with an IMI 120 mm gun, a M2 Browning .50-cal, a 7.62x51 mm NATO commander's FN MAG, and equipped with the Trophy active protection system

The IDF is planning a number of technological upgrades and structural reforms for the future. Training has been increased with greater cooperation between ground, air, and naval units.

The Ground Forces are phasing out the M-16 rifle in favor of the IWI Tavor variants, most recently the IWI Tavor X95 flat-top ("Micro-Tavor Dor Gimel"). The outdated M113 armored personnel carriers are being replaced by the new Namer APCs, with 200 ordered in 2014, as well as obtaining the Eitan AFV, and upgrading the IDF Achzarit APCs.

The backbone of the Artillery Corps, the M109 howitzer, will be phased out in favor of a still-undecided replacement, with the ATMOS 2000 and Artillery Gun Module under primary consideration.

The IDF is planning a future tank to replace the Merkava, which will be able to fire lasers and electromagnetic pulses, run on a hybrid engine, with a crew as small as two, will be faster, and will be better-protected, with emphasis on active protection systems such as the Trophy over armor.

The Combat Engineering Corps assimilated new technologies, mainly in tunnel detection and unmanned ground vehicles and military robots, such as remote-controlled IDF Caterpillar D9T "Panda" armored bulldozers, Sahar engineering scout robot and improved Remotec ANDROS robots.

== See also ==
- Israeli Air Force
- Israeli Navy
- Israeli Intelligence Community
- Israel Border Police
- Israel Military Industries

=== Related subjects ===
- Arab–Israeli conflict
- List of brigades of the Israel Defense Forces
- Military history of Israel
