= Infantry Corps (Israel) =

Israeli Infantry Corps
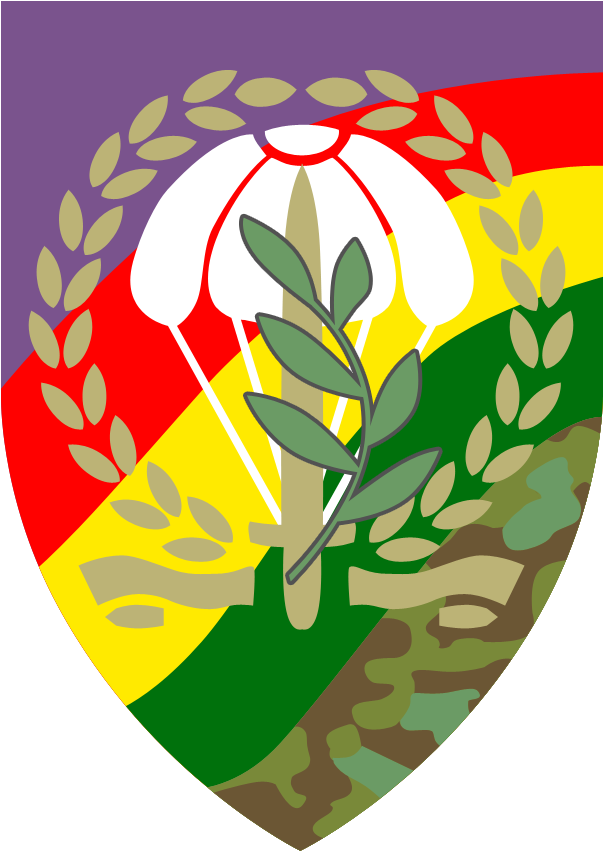
- Infantry Corps Insignia
- Active: 1948 - present
- Country: Israel
- Allegiance: Israel Defense Forces
- Branch: Israeli Ground Forces
- Type: Infantry
- Part of: administrative corps GOC Army Headquarters

Commanders
- Current commander: Colonel Omer Cohen

Insignia
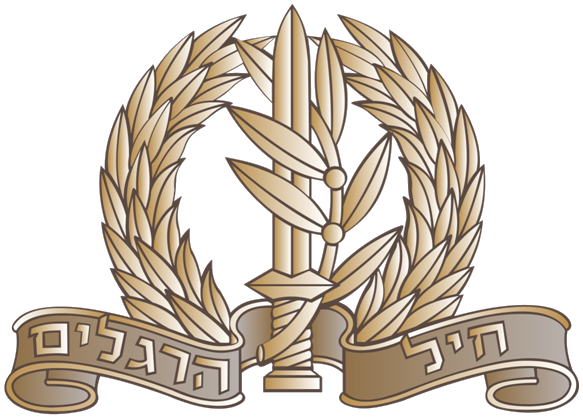
- Cap badge

- flag

The Israeli Infantry Corps is a corps in the Israel Defense Forces. It is an administrative corps for the infantry. It includes several regular and reserve service units and brigades which are operationally commanded by the IDF's regional commands.

== Overview ==
The corps moves to the battlefield either on foot, on ORVs or on armoured personnel carriers. Since the corps is based on soldiers who fight on foot, most of the weapons employed are personal or crew-served weapons.

=== Weapons ===
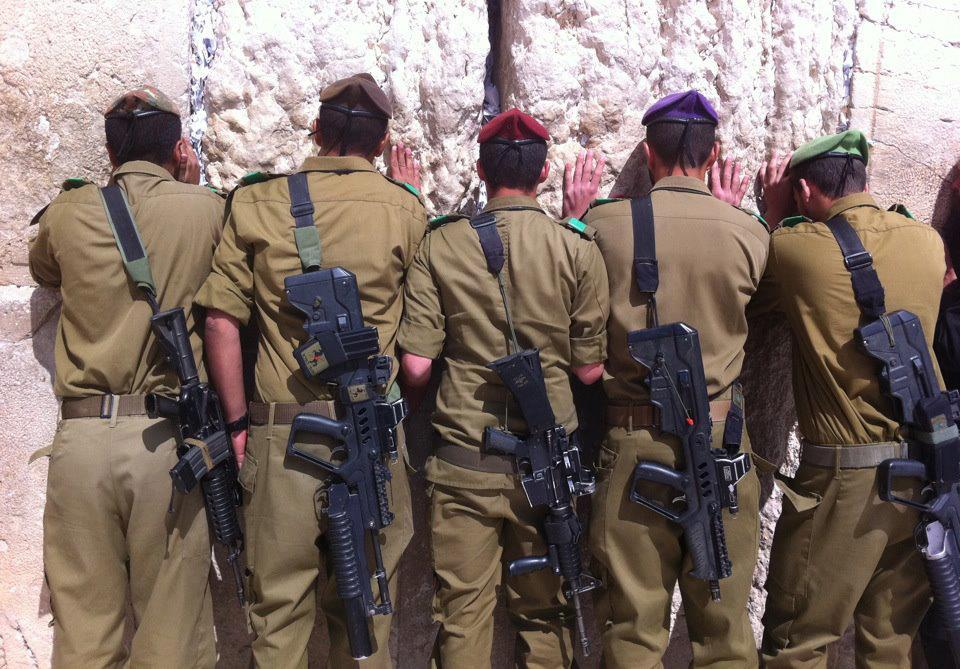
Soldiers of all five brigades at the Western Wall - from left to right, Kfir Brigade, Golani Brigade, Paratroopers Brigade, Givati Brigade, and Nahal Brigade

The personal weapon of most IDF soldiers is the IWI Tavor X-95 "Micro-Tavor", and M4A1 assault rifle. The majority of regular-service Infantry Corps soldiers are equipped with the Tavor X-95 assault rifle. In 2005, the IMI Tavor Commando assault rifle was brought to operational use, and is the corps' principal assault rifle. Every soldier in operational service is equipped with various hand grenades.

The company and platoon weapons are diverse, and include the IMI Negev and the Fabrique Nationale MAG machine guns. Heavier weapons include the Browning M2 and the General Dynamics Mk 19 grenade launcher. Various units use designated marksmen and snipers who rely on the M16A2E3, the SR-25 semi-automatic sniper rifle, the Remington M24 Sniper Weapon System, the Barrett M82A1, and recently the H-S Precision Pro Series 2000 HTR "Barak 338".

=== Missiles and rockets ===
To engage armored targets, the corps uses a variety of grenades, rockets, and missiles. The corps units are equipped with Anti-tank RPGs such as the RPG-7, the M72 LAW, and B-300 Shoulder-Launched Multipurpose Assault Weapon. Recently, the Rafael Advanced Defense Systems MATADOR anti-structures rocket entered into service, used successfully in Operation Cast Lead. These are relatively cheap and easy to operate weapons, and are in high availability to target vehicles or buildings.

Since modern campaign tanks are heavily armoured, the designated weapon against them are Anti-tank guided missiles, which are more expensive and difficult to operate than RPGs. The corps primarily uses Tow and the Spike missiles.

=== Vehicles ===
The corps uses a variety of vehicles for transport, scouting, troop mobility, security, and command and control. The light scout and mobile vehicles are Sufa jeeps and Humvees. The former are reasonably defended but not heavily armoured as they are expected to provide utmost speed and navigability. The Humvee, on the other hand, exists in a variety of forms, some relatively heavily defended, some entirely "open." It is equipped with either a machine gun, rocket, anti tank missiles, communications equipment, sometimes including a small trailer. For transporting troops through hostile areas, the "Safari" is a converted bus equipped with heavy armor.

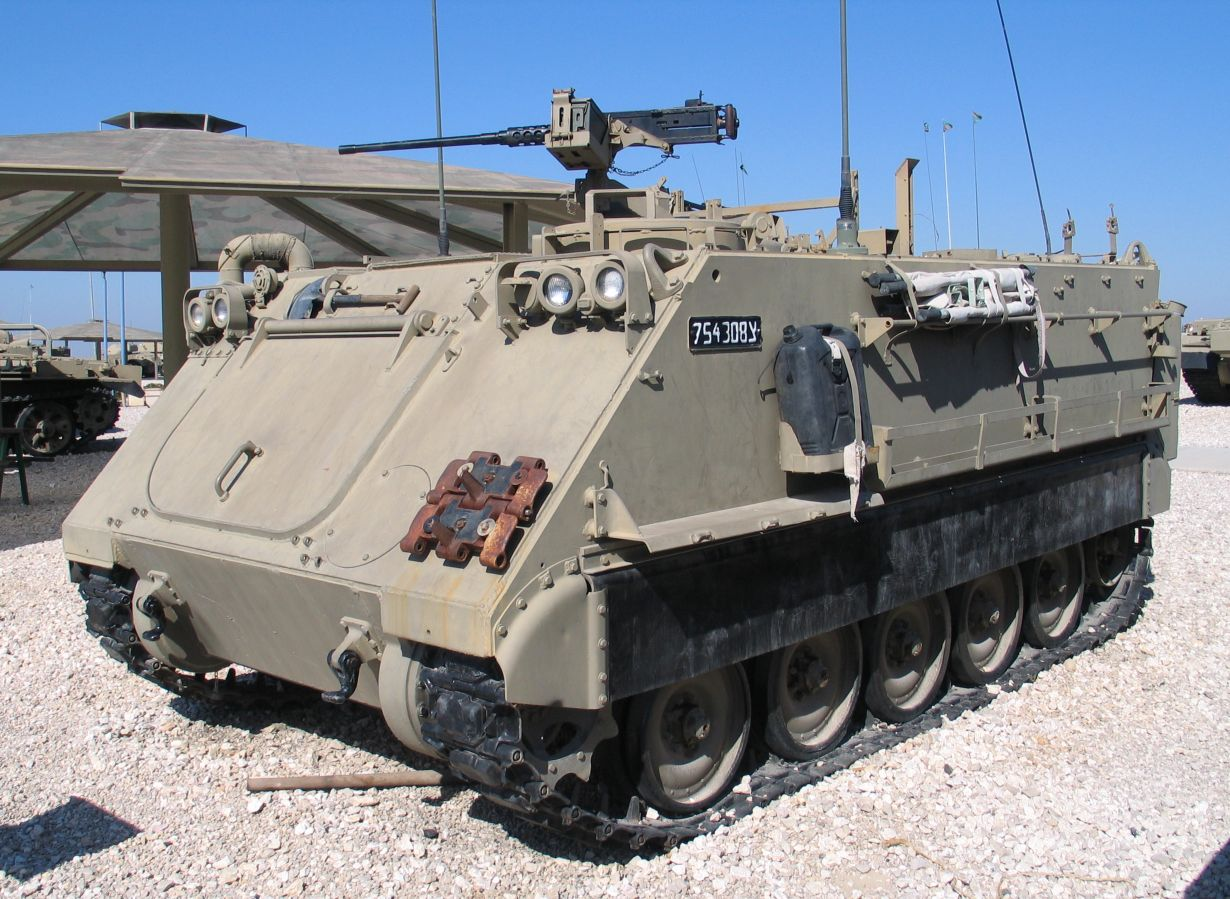
M113 APC

Under heavy fire, troops are primarily transported by APCs. Often, because of the armor offered by the APC, much of the fighting takes place with these, which are equipped with machine guns, mortars, rockets, or anti tank missiles. The IDF's principal APC is the M113, primarily those purchased from the United States during the 1970s. Despite upgrades and improvements, it is considered an old and vulnerable APC.

To respond to the need for heavier APCs, the IDF adapted a variety of older or captured tanks to serve as heavy APCs, such as the Achzarit on a T-55 chassis and the Nagmachon and Nakpadon on Centurion tank chassis. Some heavy APCs were originally combat engineering vehicles, such as the Puma, used by the Combat Engineering Corps to transport heavy engineering materials, but due to its heavy armor, sometimes used to transport troops into hostile areas.

== Active infantry brigades ==
- 1st Infantry Brigade "Golani"
- 35th Paratroopers Brigade
- 89th Commando Brigade "Oz"
- 84th Infantry Brigade "Givati"
- 900th Infantry Brigade "Kfir"
- 933rd Infantry Brigade "Nahal"

== Reserve brigades ==
- 2nd Infantry Brigade "Carmeli"
- 3rd Infantry Brigade "Alexandroni"
- 5th Infantry Brigade "HaSharon"
- 6th Infantry Brigade "Etzioni"
- 9th Infantry Brigade "Oded"
- 11th Infantry Brigade "Yiftach"
- 12th Infantry Brigade "Negev"
- 16th Infantry Brigade "Jerusalem"
- 55th Paratroopers Brigade "Hod Ha-Hanit"
- 261st Infantry Brigade (IDF Officers' School Brigade)
- 226th Paratroopers Brigade "Nesher"
- 228th Infantry Brigade "Alon"
- 551st Paratroopers Brigade "Hetzei HaEsch"
- 646th Paratroopers Brigade "Schualey Marom"
- 828th Infantry Brigade (Bislamach Brigade)
- 855th Guard Brigade "Hashomer" (formed December 2023)
- 5692th Infantry Brigade "Ari"
- 6050th Infantry Brigade "Daniel"

== Independent units ==
- The Oketz unit (dog handlers).

== See also ==
- Israel Defense Forces
- IDF Code of Ethics
