= 226th Paratroopers Brigade =

Israeli military unit

226th Paratroopers Brigade (Israel)
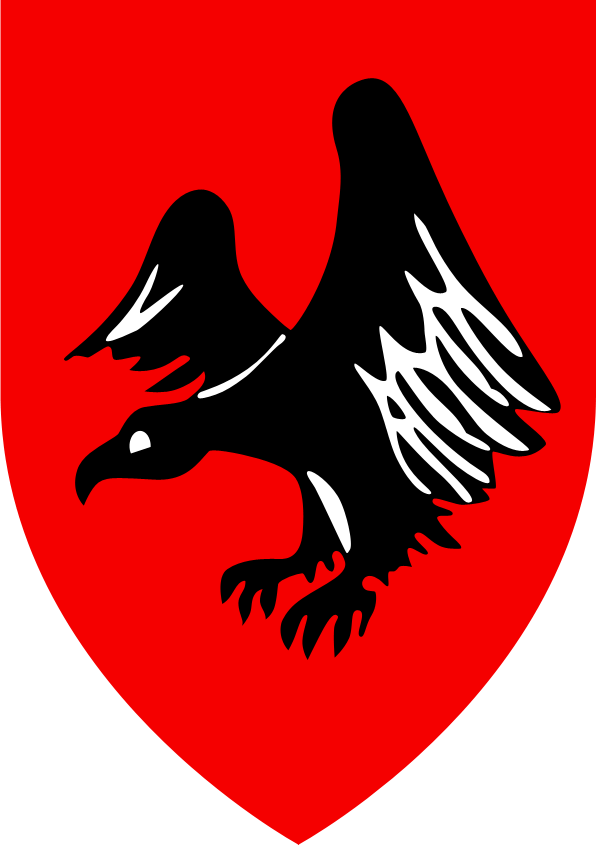
- Active: 1957 – present
- Country: Israel
- Branch: Infantry Corps
- Type: Airborne forces
- Size: Brigade
- Part of: 146th Division "Ha-Mapatz"
- Nickname: "The Northern" ("הצפונית")
- Mottos: ככל שנגביה עוף נרחיק לראות... The higher we will fly, the farther we will see...
- Engagements: Six Day War; Battle of Abu Ageila; Yom Kippur War; Battle of the Chinese Farm; Operation Dessert; Battle of Ein Zakhalta; 2024 Israeli invasion of Lebanon; 2026 Lebanon war

Commanders
- Current commander: Ran Fridman
- Notable commanders: Danny Matt, Haim Nadel, Elazar Stern, Dan Goldfus, Eliezer Toledano.

The 226th Paratroopers Brigade "Nesher/Eagle" (Hebrew: 226 חטיבת הנשר; Brigade 80 in the Six-Day War, later Brigade 317, then Brigade 939; also known as Nesher (Eagle) Formation and The Northern Brigade) is a reserve paratrooper brigade that was established in 1957. The brigade is currently part of the 146th "Blast" Division which is a reserve armored division in the Northern Command. The unit's emblem is a black eagle on a red background.

== Unit Designation and Objectives ==
The brigade is airborne forces unit, which does not operate heavy IFVs and is intended for quick maneuvering in the Northern theatre. The brigade's main objectives are offensive operations inside Lebanon, and defensive operations along the Northern Israeli border. Contrary to intuition, only the 55th reserve brigade is actively practicing parachute capabilities, while the rest of the reserve paratroopers brigades in the IDF, including the 226th, rely on light IFVs and helicopter drops.

During the Second Lebanon War the brigade fought in southern Lebanon suffering many casualties and achieving significant operational success in several Hezbollah held villages.

During the current Gaza war the brigade was recruited and stationed on the western half of the northern border where it fought an attritional war against Hezbollah for several months, while preparing for an all out war. During the invasion, forces from the brigade maneuvered in Aitaroun, Aalma ash-Shaab, An-Naqoura, Al-Khiyam and Al-Aadaissah engaging with Hezbollah combatants, destroying more than 150 sites above and below ground, in towns and forests while locating and seizing numerous weapons, maps, and enemy documents.

The brigade took part in combat operations during the 2026 Lebanon war. On 17 April 2026, one of its soldiers was killed after being struck by a Hezbollah explosive device.

== Organizational Context ==
The 226th is one of the four reserve paratroopers brigades in the IDF reserve corps:

- The 55th Paratroopers Brigade "Tip of the Spear" and the 551th "Arrows of Fire" also known as the "central" brigades which belong to the central command.
- The 646th "Sky Foxes" also known as the "southern brigade" which belongs to the southern command.
- the 226th "Nesher/Eagle" also known as the "northern brigade" of the northern command.

== Unit Personnel ==
The brigade's battalions are composed primarily of veterans of the 35th Paratroopers Brigade, which is the regular paratroopers brigade in the IDF. Specifically, the 226th brigade and its 4 battalions are manned by those who have served in the 202nd battalion of the regular 35th brigade, while the veterans of the other 3 battalions of the regular brigade feed into their corresponding paratrooper brigades in the IDF reserve corps. The 6226th Reconnaissance Battalion is an exception, as are the other reconnaissance battalions in their respective reserve brigades. They are composed of veterans who served in "Sayeret Tzanchanim", the 5135th Reconnaissance Battalion, which performs special forces missions for the 35th Paratroopers Brigade.

== Unit Structure ==
- 226th Paratroopers Brigade "Nesher/Eagle" (Reserve)
  - 7056th Paratroopers Battalion
  - 9255th Paratroopers Battalion
  - 9263th Paratroopers Battalion
  - (6226th) Reconnaissance Battalion "Nesher"
  - 5226th Logistic Battalion
  - Signal Company
