= 228th Infantry Brigade (Israel) =

228th Infantry Brigade "Alon"
- חטיבת אלון
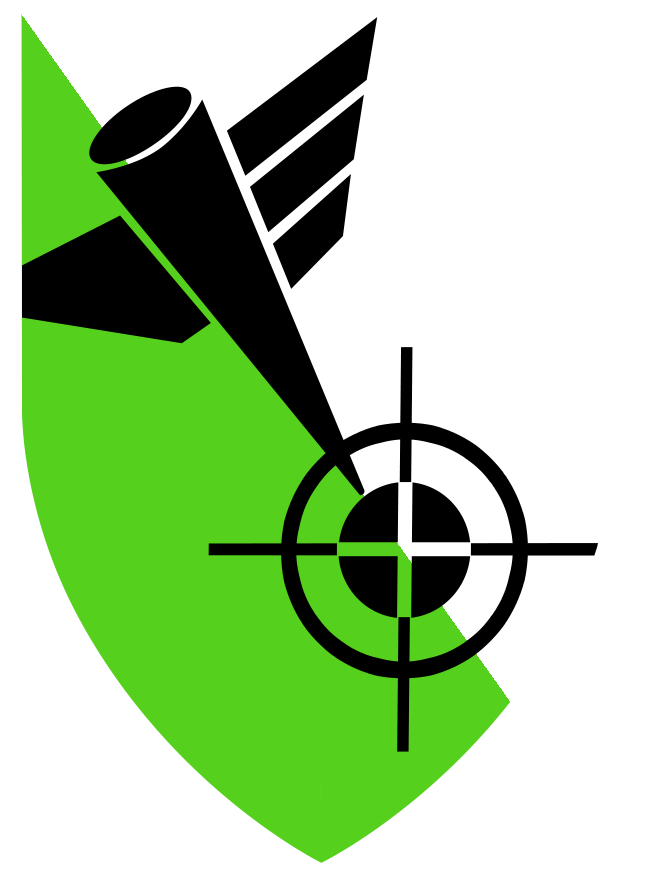
- Active: 1948 – present
- Country: Israel
- Branch: Israeli Ground Forces
- Type: Reserve
- Size: Brigade
- Part of: 146th Division "Ha-Mapatz"
- Engagements: First Lebanon War; Operation Defensive Shield; Iron Swords war

228th Infantry Brigade "Alon" (Hebrew: חטיבת אלון 228) also known as the "Northern Nahal Brigade" (Hebrew: חטיבת נח"ל הצפונית) due to its subordination to the Northern Command—is an Israel Defense Forces reserve infantry brigade. It is one of three brigades composed of veterans from the Nahal Brigade, alongside the Jerusalem Brigade and the Etzioni Brigade. In the past, it was classified as a light infantry brigade and was part of the Tzemach Regional Brigade, which operated under the Yehuda Division. Among other operations, it took part in Operation Defensive Shield. Following lessons learned from the Second Lebanon War, the brigade was converted into a standard infantry brigade. This conversion process was completed in 2012.

== History ==
The origins of the Alon Formation lie in the reserve component of the "HaAmakim" (The Valleys) Regional Brigade (Brigade 228, also known as the Tzemach Regional Brigade) during the 1970s.

Following the War of Independence, Brigade 2 (formerly the Carmeli Brigade) was established as a regional brigade covering the southern Jordan Valley and the Beit She'an Valley. During the Six-Day War, this area fell under the command of the Kinneret Sector (Gush Kinneret). During the War of Attrition, the reserve brigade's headquarters was redesignated as Regional Brigade 612—the "HaAmakim" Regional Brigade. During the Yom Kippur War, the brigade was placed under the command of the Central Command. In 1974, Infantry Brigade 165—which later fought in the First Lebanon War—was split off from the HaAmakim headquarters.

Within the HaAmakim Regional Brigade (228), headquartered at Tzemach, an independent reserve unit was formed, composed of residents from the Jordan Valley and the northern region. Its emergency supply depots were located at the "Kfar HaYeladim" (Children's Village) site, opposite HaEmek Hospital in Afula. In 1979, this reserve unit became an infantry brigade, separate from the regional brigade. Designated as Brigade 172, it was placed under the command of Division 92, which was stationed at the Kfar HaYeladim site. In 1983, it was decided to once again separate Brigade 172 and Reserve Storage Unit (Yamach) 228. The brigade was relocated to Camp Amos, placed under the command of Territorial Division 85 (the "Valleys" Division), and redesignated as Reserve Storage Unit 228.

In 1992, Territorial Division 85 was disbanded, and the brigade was transferred to the command of the Judea Division.

In 1993, the brigade's number was changed to 7228 (by adding the digit '7') to distinguish between the regular territorial brigade stationed at Tzemach and the reserve brigade located at Camp Amos.

Following a decrease in the security threat within the territorial brigade's sector, and in light of force structure adjustments implemented by the IDF in the early 2000s, the reserve brigade was transferred to the Northern Command. In 2003, the Tzemach Territorial Brigade was merged with the Jordan Valley (Bik'a) Territorial Brigade, and the reserve brigade reverted to the designation 228.

In late 2012, the conversion of the unit into an elite infantry brigade—composed of veterans of the Nahal Brigade—was completed (replacing its previous composition of general infantry veterans). This conversion process was initiated in response to lessons learned from the Second Lebanon War. The unit retained its number (228) and was placed under the command of the HaMapatz Division.

=== 7th of October War ===
On October 7, 2023, the brigade was deployed to the Lebanese border under the command of the 91st Division to defend the northern border against an attack by the terrorist organization Hezbollah, following Hamas's surprise attack on the communities surrounding the Gaza Strip and the Western Negev. The brigade's forces conducted defensive operations in the eastern sector and subsequently in the western sector under the 146th Division; they also carried out proactive offensive actions and, as part of their readiness for the "day of command" (the order to engage), practiced ground maneuvers inside Lebanon.

As part of the ground maneuver in southern Lebanon, the brigade fought under the command of the 91st Division, destroying terrorist infrastructure and eliminating terrorists in villages near the border in southern Lebanon.

On the 28th of Iyar 5784 (June 5, 2024), the IDF announced that Staff Sergeant First Class (Res.) Rafael Kauders, from Tzur Hadassah—who served as the coordinator for tradition and spirit in Battalion 5030—was killed in a Hezbollah UAV attack in the town of Hurfeish.

On September 11, 2024, Sergeant Major (Res.) Valery Chefunov was killed in a UAV attack near Kibbutz Kabri.

On October 9, 2024, the IDF announced that Sergeant Major (Res.) Roni Ganizat, a combat soldier in Battalion 5030, was killed in action in southern Lebanon. In the same battle, Sergeant Major (Res.) Yishai (Netanel) Greenbaum, a platoon sergeant in Battalion 5030, was severely wounded. On October 18, the IDF announced that Yishai had succumbed to his wounds.

On October 22, 2024, the IDF announced that the Deputy Commander of Battalion 9308, Rabbi Aviram Hariv, had fallen in battle.

On October 26, 2024, soldiers from the Alon Brigade continued combat operations in southern Lebanon. During one of these operations, a force of reserve soldiers from Battalion 8207 (part of the 228th Brigade) entered a building where a Radwan Force terrorist cell was located and engaged in an exchange of fire. As a result of the battle, five soldiers from the Alon Brigade were killed.
