= 4th Armored Brigade "Kiryati" =

Israeli military unit

- חטיבת קרייתי
- Active: 1948 – present
- Country: Israel
- Allegiance: Israel Defense Forces
- Branch: Infantry Corps
- Type: Reserve
- Size: Brigade
- Part of: 146th Division "Ha-Mapatz"
- Engagements: 1948 Arab–Israeli War; Suez Crisis; Six-Day War; Yom Kippur War; 2014 Gaza War; 2024 Israeli invasion of Lebanon

4th Brigade "Kiryati" (Hebrew: חטיבת קרייתי; formerly known as the 166th Brigade and the 602nd Brigade) is a reserve armored brigade subordinate to the 146th "HaMapatz" Division, a reserve division in the Northern Command. As of today, it is the only reserve armored brigade that operates the Merkava 4 tanks.

It was formerly a light infantry brigade of the Haganah and later a regular brigade in the IDF.

== History ==
The brigade was established in Tel Aviv in February 1948, based on light infantry companies, after the Givati Brigade, which included the elite light infantry battalions from the Tel Aviv area, was withdrawn from the city to the Southern Command. The brigade included three infantry battalions, secular and religious Gdana graduates, and a Guard Corps battalion. The brigade's border was the urban area of the city of Tel Aviv from the Yarkon River in the north to Bat Yam in the south to Yazur (Azor) in the east. Within the brigade's boundaries was the winding urban border line between Tel Aviv and Jaffa and the villages of Salama (Kfar Shalem) and Abu Kabir. The brigade secured the roads from Holon and Mikveh Yisrael to the city and the beginning of the road to Jerusalem through the Arab villages of Yazur and Bayt Dajan. In its northern sector, the brigade's forces guarded Sde Dov.

With the outbreak of the Gaza war, the brigade was mobilized. In the attack by the 98th Paratroopers Division to capture Khan Yunis, the forces of the Kiryati Brigade's combat team under the command of Brigadier General Miki Sharvit fought together with brigade combat teams of the 55th Paratroopers Brigade and the Givati Brigade, and Engineering Battalion 7071, surrounded the city while carrying out targeted operations, attacks and raids against companies in the Khan Yunis Brigade of the Hamas terrorist organization.

The 7071st Brigade took part in the land maneuver in southern Lebanon, participating as an engineering force within the framework of the Explosive Formation, which operated in the western sector together with the 2nd Brigade and the 205th Brigade.

With the outbreak of Operation Rising Lion, the 7071st Brigade was deployed to reinforce and carry out engineering missions on the Lebanese border.
