= 146th Division (Israel) =

Israeli military unit

146th Division "Ha-Mapatz"
- עוצבת המפץ
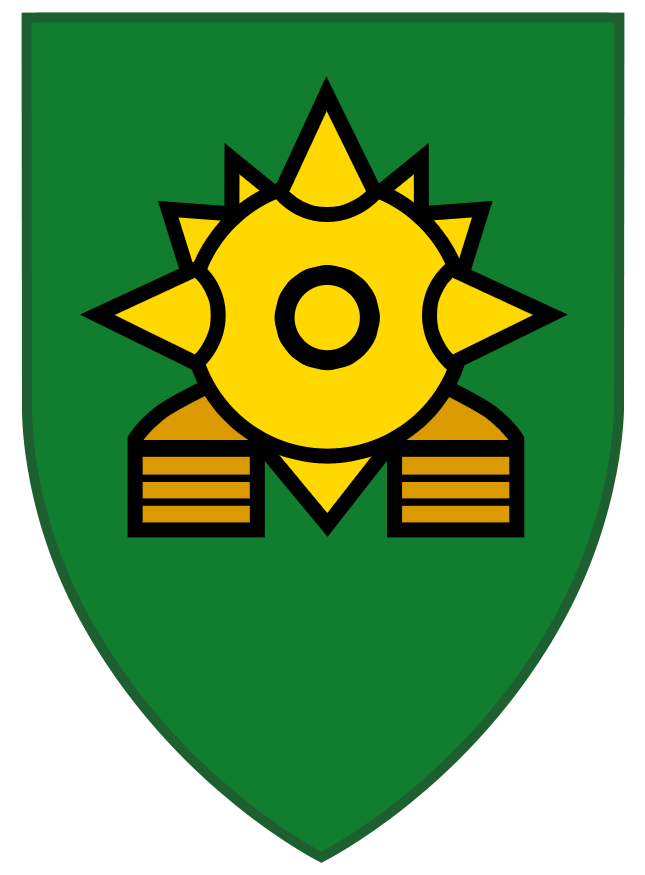
- Division symbol
- Active: 1954–present
- Country: Israel
- Branch: Israeli Ground Forces
- Type: Reserve armored division
- Size: Division
- Part of: Northern Command
- Garrison/HQ: Havat HaShomer Camp
- Nickname: Ha-Mapatz (המפץ)
- Colors: Green and Yellow
- Engagements: Six-Day War; Yom Kippur (1973); First Lebanon War; Israeli disengagement plan Second Lebanon War; 2024 Israeli invasion of Lebanon; 2026 Lebanon war

Commanders
- Current commander: Beni Aharon
- Notable commanders: Ariel Sharon

The 146th Division "Ha-Mapatz" (Hebrew: עוצבת המפץ), literally "Bang" Division, is a reserve Division of the Israel Defense Forces. It is subordinate to Northern Command.

== History ==
Formed in 1954, it fought in the Suez Crisis and Six-Day War as the 38th Division. In the latter conflict, the division was led by Major General Ariel Sharon. During the Yom Kippur War, the division fought in the battles of the northern Golan under Major General Moshe Peled. It was known as 319th division from after the Yom Kipur War to September 2020 when it received its old number.

== Division organization ==
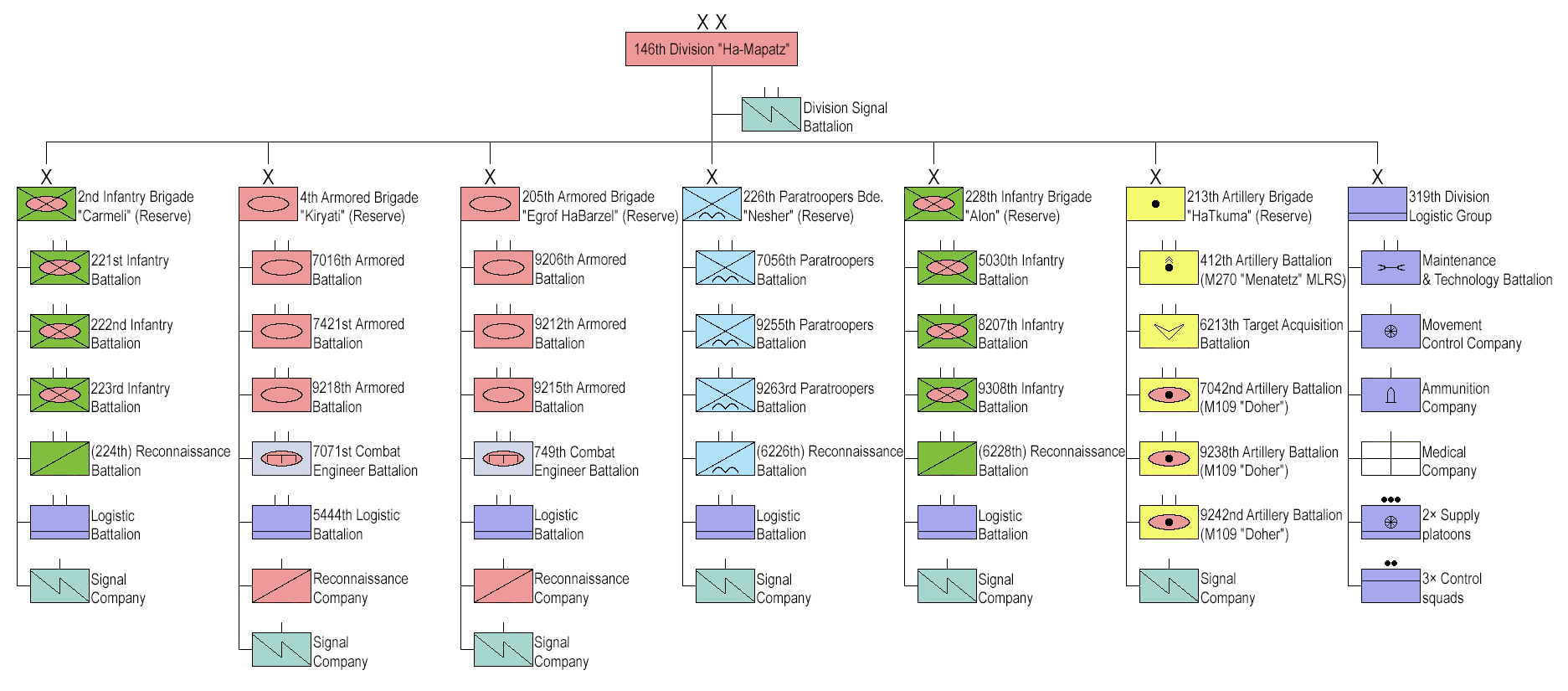
146th Division "Ha-Mapatz" organization as of November 2026

- 146th Division "Ha-Mapatz/Bang"
  - 2nd Infantry Brigade "Carmeli" (Reserve)
    - 221st Infantry Battalion
    - 222nd Infantry Battalion
    - 223rd Infantry Battalion
    - (224th) Reconnaissance Battalion
    - 5222nd Logistic Battalion
    - 5172nd Signal Company
  - 4th Armored Brigade "Kiryati" (Reserve)
    - 7016th Armored Battalion
    - 7421st Armored Battalion
    - 9218th Armored Battalion
    - 7071st Combat Engineer Battalion
    - 5444th Logistic Battalion
    - 4th Reconnaissance Company
    - Signal Company
  - 205th Armored Brigade "Egrof HaBarzel" ("Iron Fist") (Reserve)
    - 9206th Armored Battalion
    - 9212th Armored Battalion
    - 9215th Armored Battalion
    - 749th Combat Engineer Battalion
    - 5205th Logistic Battalion
    - 5354th Reconnaissance Company
    - Signal Company
  - 226th Paratroopers Brigade "Nesher" ("Eagle") (Reserve)
    - 7056th Paratroopers Battalion
    - 9255th Paratroopers Battalion
    - 9263rd Paratroopers Battalion
    - (6226th) Reconnaissance Battalion
    - 5226th Logistic Battalion
    - Signal Company
  - 228th Infantry Brigade "Alon" ("Oak") (Reserve)
    - 5030th Infantry Battalion
    - 8207th Infantry Battalion
    - 9308th Infantry Battalion
    - (6228th) Reconnaissance Battalion
    - Logistic Battalion
    - Signal Company
  - 213th Artillery Brigade "HaTkuma" ("The Revival") (Reserve)
    - 412th Artillery Battalion (M270 "Menatetz" MLRS)
    - 6213th Target Acquisition Battalion
    - 7042nd Artillery Battalion (M109 "Doher" self-propelled howitzers)
    - 9238th Artillery Battalion (M109 "Doher" self-propelled howitzers)
    - 9242nd Artillery Battalion (M109 "Doher" self-propelled howitzers)
    - Signal Company
  - 319th Division Logistic Group
  - Division Signal Battalion

== See also ==
- Battle of Abu-Ageila (1967)
