= 205th Armored Brigade =

Israeli military unit

205th Armored Brigade "Iron Fist"
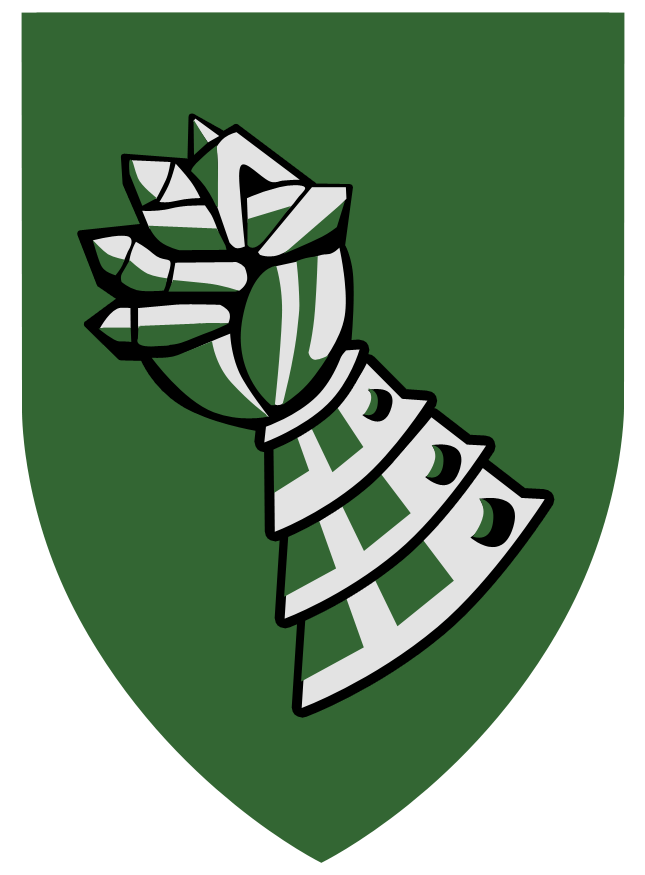
- Active: 15 September 1961 – present
- Country: Israel
- Allegiance: Israel Defense Forces
- Branch: Armor
- Type: Reserve
- Size: Brigade
- Part of: 146th Division "Ha-Mapatz"
- Engagements: Six-Day War; Yom Kippur War; First Lebanon War; 2024 Israeli invasion of Lebanon

205th Armored Brigade "Iron Fist" (Hebrew: חטיבת אגרוף הברזל; formerly known as 514th Brigade and 200th Brigade) is an IDF reserve armored brigade and is part of the 146th "Hamapatz" Division belonging to the Northern Command. The brigade was established in 1961 and was the first reserve brigade with Centurion tanks. The brigade took part in four wars: the Six-Day War, the Yom Kippur War, the First Lebanon War and the Iron Swords War. Since 1998, the brigade has been using Merkava 3 tanks.

== History ==
The brigade was established on 15 September 1961 by Yisaskhar Shadmi, and was the first reserve brigade with Centurion tanks. The brigade's permanent camp was in Camp Plugut. The first battalion attached to the brigade was the 61st Chermash Battalion, an Etzioni Brigade that was originally established in the Jerusalem Brigade in 1947 and transferred to the 7th Armored Brigade during the Sinai War. In 1962, the 125th Armored Battalion was established, absorbing graduates of the 82nd Battalion, which was the regular Centurion battalion in the IDF. At the same time, the brigade's reconnaissance company and engineering company were also established. In 1965, the 86th Armored Battalion was transferred to the division, based on AMX-13 tanks. In 1966, the 94th Battalion, also a Centurion, was established.

The brigade's insignia includes a knight's gauntlet reminiscent of the Royal Armoured Corps, and the brigade's name was changed to Steel Fist. During the Six-Day War, the brigade's name was changed to Iron Fist to change the resemblance to the Steel Division under the command of Israel Tal.

With the outbreak of the Iron Sword War, the brigade was mobilized for missions to defend the northern border and its settlements. Several units of the brigade participated in the beginning of the maneuver in Gaza. In a battle that took place on 22 January 2024 on the outskirts of the Maghazi refugee camp in the central Gaza Strip, in which 21 fighters fell, two fighters from Company L of the brigade's 9206th Battalion, Major General Yuval Lopes and Captain Ariel Wolfsthal, were killed by an anti-tank missile strike on a tank.

Later, the brigade took a line in the Gaza perimeter and in the Netzarim Corridor. In an operational accident that occurred in Rafah on 22 June 2024, Major General Malkia Gross from the brigade's 9212th Battalion was killed.

The brigade participated in the ground maneuver in southern Lebanon in October 2024, under the 146th Division. The brigade operated in the western sector and the coastal area and also cooperated with forces from the Navy, including the 3rd Fleet. Among other operations, the brigade destroyed a 120-meter-long underground Hezbollah infrastructure.

During April-May 2025, the brigade captured the Philadelphi Corridor, eliminated dozens of terrorists, destroyed infrastructure, and was responsible for securing and establishing aid distribution centers for Gazans in the Rafah area.
