= 55th Paratroopers Brigade =

Israeli Defense Forces' reserve-service infantry Brigade

IDF Brigade 55 symbol

55th Paratroopers Brigade, also known as "Tip of The Spear Brigade" (Hebrew: עֻצְבַּת חוד החנית, Utzbat Hod Ha-Hanit), is a reserve paratrooper brigade in the Israel Defense Forces (IDF) that specialized in airborne operations, anti-irregular military, counterinsurgency, CQB/CQC in urban areas, desert warfare, long-range penetration, maneuver warfare, raiding with small unit tactics, and special reconnaissance.

== History ==
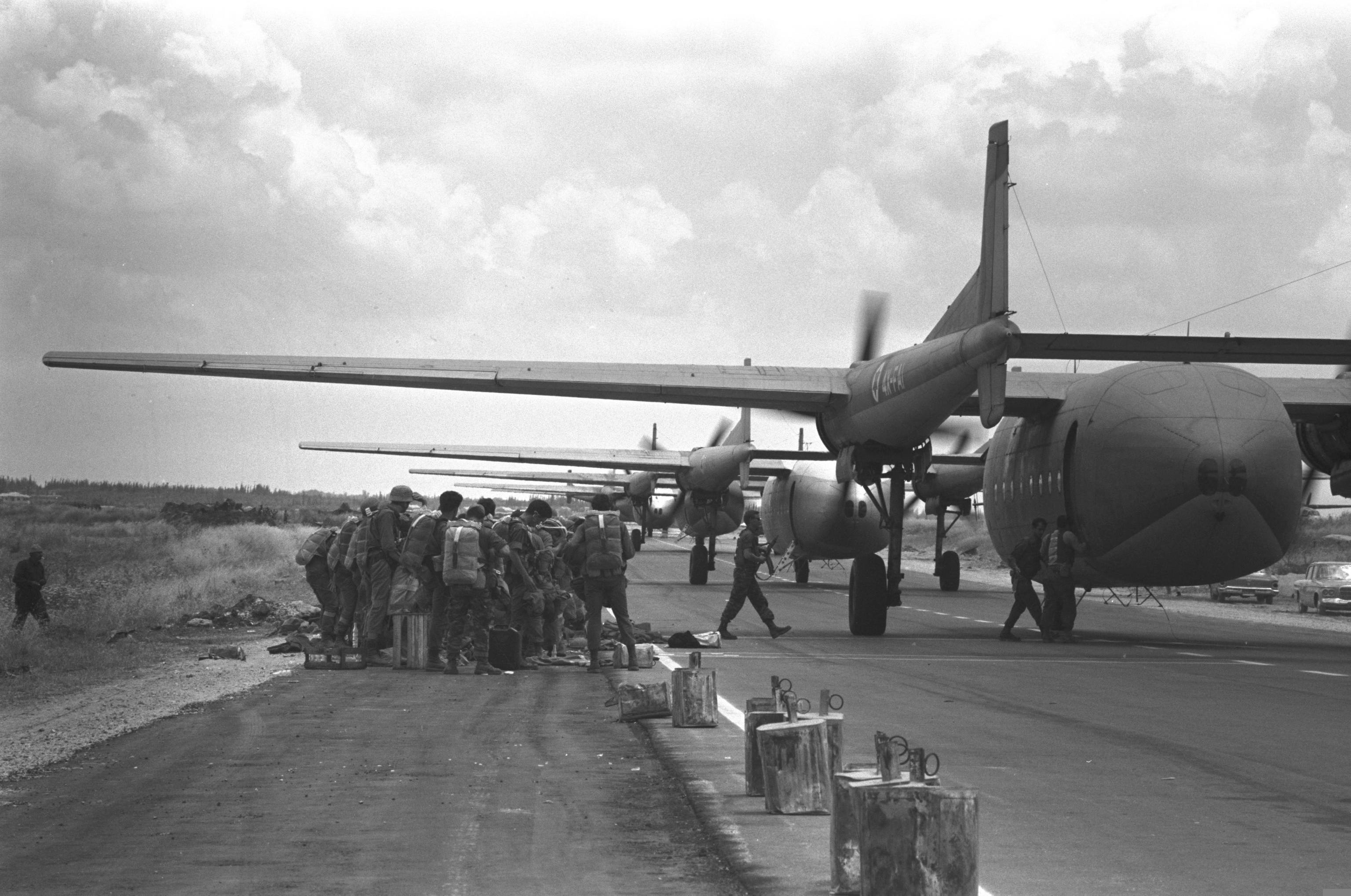
Paratroopers of 55th Brigade lining up for action in Sinai, June 1967

The 55th Paratroopers Brigade is subordinate to the 98th Paratroopers Division.

The brigade is an airborne forces unit within the IDF which over the years has taken part in a number of the IDF operations, including the Battle of Ammunition Hill during the Six-Day War, Operation Stoutehearted Men during the Yom Kippur War, the 1982 Lebanon War and the 2006 Lebanon War.

The 55th is famous specifically for being the first Israeli brigade into the Old City of Jerusalem in 1967 and the first to cross the Suez Canal in 1973.

After Hamas' October 7 attacks on Israel, the Brigade fought in Kfar Aza, rescuing Israelis from their safe rooms, before eventually clearing the bodies of the Kfar Aza massacre. Later in the war it was one the forces which led the IDF operation in Khan Younis, as well as the ground offensive against the Hezbollah terror group in Lebanon.

In November 2025 soldiers from the Brigade were injured while arresting Al-Jama'a al-Islamiyya leaders in a raid in Beit Jinn, Syria.

=== Brigade organization 2025 ===
- 55th Paratroopers Brigade "Hod Ha-Hanit/Tip of The Spear" (Reserve)
  - 2855th Paratroopers Battalion
  - 6655th Paratroopers Battalion
  - 7155th Paratroopers Battalion
  - (6623rd) Reconnaissance Battalion "Hod Ha-Hanit"
  - 5055th Logistic Battalion
  - Signal Company
