= Battles of Latrun (1948) =

Jordanian victories in the First Arab–Israeli War

Coordinates: 31°50′18.39″N 34°58′50.71″E

- Part of the 1948 Arab–Israeli War
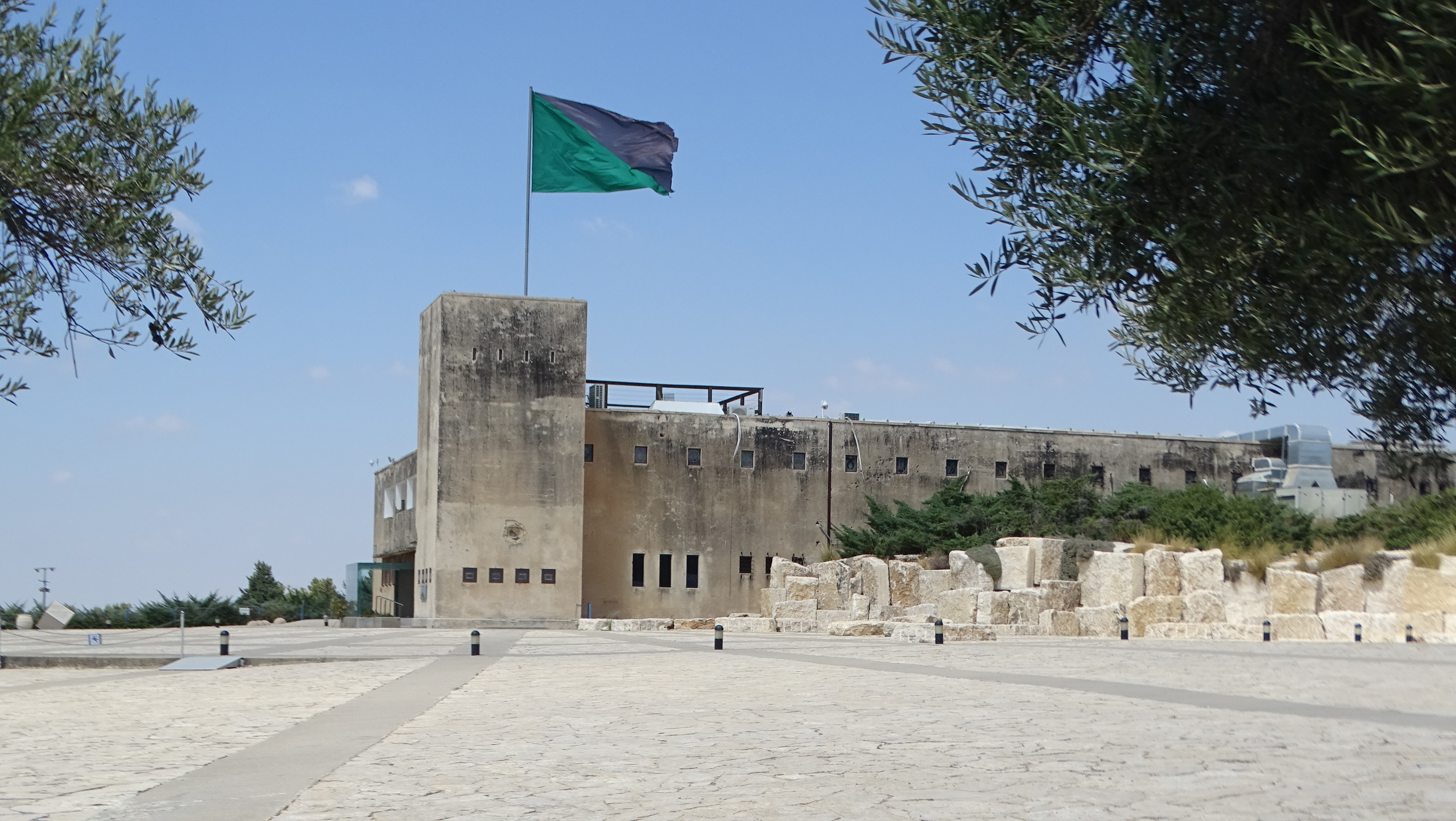
- The police fort at Latrun
Date	24 May – 18 July 1948 (1 month, 3 weeks and 3 days)
Location	Latrun, territories attributed to the Arab state by the 1947 Partition Plan.
Result	Jordanian victory
Territorial changes	Jordan captures East Jerusalem, including the Old City

Belligerents
Israel (IDF)	(Jordan) Transjordan (AL)

Commanders and leaders
(Israel) Shlomo Shamir (Israel) Mickey Marcus †	(Jordan) Habis Al-Majali

Strength
4 brigades (3rd, 7th, 10th, 11th)	Arab Legion 2 brigades (4 Battalions)

Casualties and losses
Bin Nun Alef: 72 killed 140 wounded 6 captured Bin Nun Bet: 44 killed 88 wounded Operation Yoram: 45+ killed 99 wounded 13 captured July 16: 23 killed July 18: 53–57 killed	Bin Nun Alef: 5 killed 6 wounded Bin Nun Bet: 12-20 killed Operation Yoram: Several dozen casualties

The Battles of Latrun were a series of military engagements between the Israel Defense Forces and the Jordanian Arab Legion on the outskirts of Latrun between 25 May and 18 July 1948, during the 1948 Arab–Israeli War. Latrun takes its name from the monastery close to the junction of two major highways: Jerusalem to Jaffa/Tel Aviv and Gaza to Ramallah. During the British Mandate it became a Palestine Police base with a Tegart fort. The United Nations Resolution 181 placed this area within the proposed Arab state. In May 1948, it was under the control of the Arab Legion. It commanded the only road linking the Yishuv-controlled area of Jerusalem to Israel, giving Latrun strategic importance in the battle for Jerusalem.

Despite assaulting Latrun on five separate occasions, Israel was ultimately unable to capture Latrun and it remained under Jordanian control until the Six-Day War. The battles were such a decisive Jordanian victory that the Israelis decided to construct a bypass surrounding Latrun so as to allow vehicular movement between Tel Aviv and Jerusalem, thus avoiding the main road. Regardless, during the Battle for Jerusalem, the Jewish population of Jerusalem could still be supplied by a new road, named the "Burma Road", that bypassed Latrun and was suitable for convoys. The Battle of Latrun left its imprint on the Israeli collective imagination, though in two different versions, and constitutes part of the "founding myth" of the Jewish State. The attacks cost the lives of 168 Israeli soldiers, but some accounts inflated this number to as many as 2,000. The combat at Latrun also carries a symbolic significance because of the participation of Holocaust survivors.

Today, the battleground site has an Israeli military museum dedicated to the Israeli Armored Corps and a memorial to the 1947–1949 Palestine war.

== Background ==
=== 1948 Arab–Israeli War ===
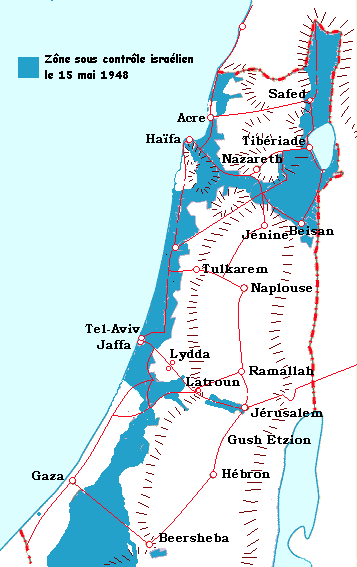
Area under Israeli control on 15 May 1948

After the adoption of the United Nations Partition Plan for Palestine in November 1947, a civil war erupted in the British Mandate of Palestine. The Jews living in Jerusalem constituted one of the weak points of the Yishuv and a main cause for concern to its leaders. With nearly 100,000 inhabitants, a sixth of the total Jewish population in the Mandate, the city was isolated in the heart of territory under Arab control. (Note: See War of the roads and blockade of Jerusalem and Operation Nachshon.)

In January, in the context of the "War of the Roads", the Holy War Army of Abd al-Qadir al-Husayni besieged the Jewish part of the city and stopped convoys passing between Tel Aviv and Jerusalem. By the end of March, the tactic proved its worth and the city was cut off. The Haganah then launched Operation Nachshon, 4–20 April, and managed to force through a number of large convoys. Following the death of Abd al-Qader al-Husayni at al-Qastal, the Arab League's military committee ordered the other Arab force in Palestine, the Arab Liberation Army, to move its forces from Samaria to the road of Jerusalem and the areas of Latrun, Ramla, and Lydda.

In the middle of May, the situation for the 50,000 Arab inhabitants of the city and the 30,000–40,000 in the outlying neighbourhoods was no better. After the massacre at Deir Yassin and the Jewish offensive of April that triggered the large-scale exodus of the Palestinian Arabs in other mixed cities, the Arab population of Jerusalem was frightened and feared for its fate. With the departure of the British on 14 May, the Haganah launched several operations to take control of the city and the local Arab leadership requested King Abdullah of Jordan to deploy his army to come to their aid.

On 15 May, the situation in Mandatory Palestine was chaotic with the British leaving and the newly declared State of Israel. The Jewish forces gained advantage over the Arab forces, but they feared the intervention of the Arab armies that had been announced for that day.

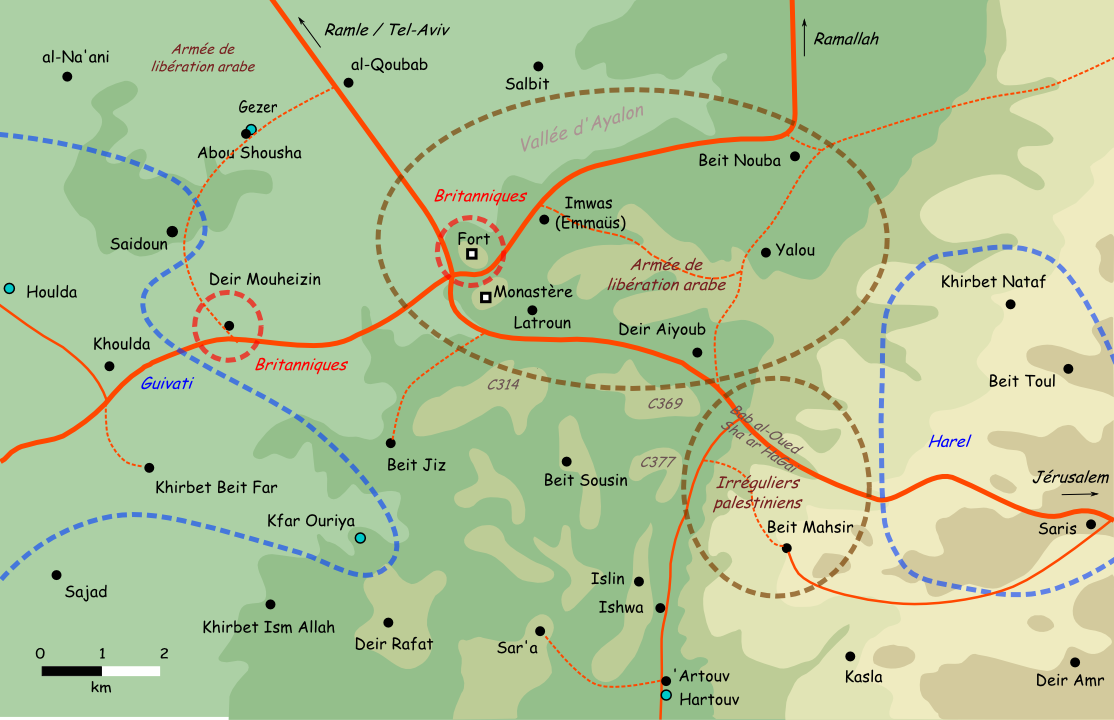
Latrun area (10 May 1948)

=== Geography ===
Latrun is located at the crossroads between the Tel Aviv–Ramla–Jerusalem and Ramallah–Isdud roads in the area allocated to the Arab state by the United Nations Partition Plan. At that point, the Jerusalem road enters the foothills of Judea at Bab al-Wad (Sha'ar HaGai). The fort dominated the Valley of Ayalon, and the force that occupied it commanded the road to Jerusalem. (Note: See this picture of the valley taken from the hills of Latrun.)

In 1948, Latrun comprised a detention camp and a fortified police station occupied by the British, a Trappist monastery, and several Arab villages: Latrun, Imwas, Dayr Ayyub and Bayt Nuba. During the civil war, after the death of Abd al-Qadir al-Husayni, the forces of the Arab Liberation Army positioned themselves around the police fort and the surrounding villages, to the indifference of the British. They regularly attacked supply convoys heading for Jerusalem. At that time, neither the Israeli nor Jordanian military staffs had prepared for the strategic importance of the place.

== Prelude ==
=== Operation Maccabi (8–16 May) ===
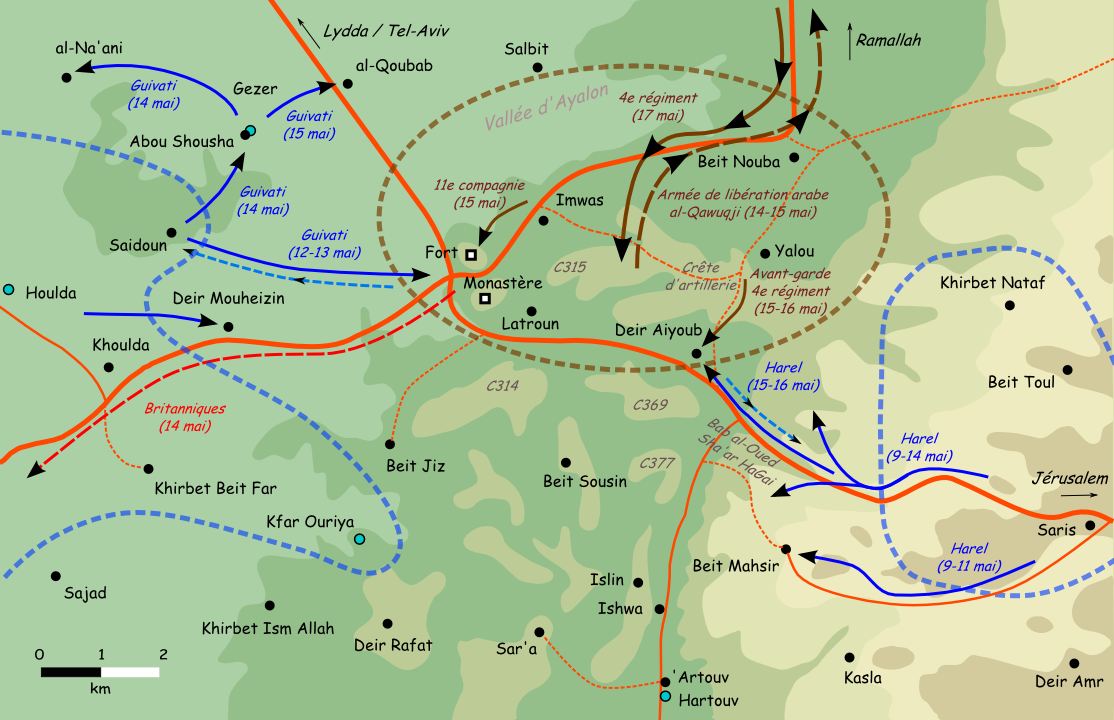
Latrun area (around 15 May 1948)

On 8 May, Haganah launched Operation Maccabi against the Arab Liberation Army and the Palestinian irregulars who occupied several villages along the Jerusalem road and prevented the resupplying of Jerusalem's Jewish community. The Givati Brigade (on the west side) and Harel Brigade (on the east side) were engaged in fighting, notably in the Latrun area.

Between 9–11 May, a battalion of the Harel brigade attacked and took the village of Bayt Mahsir, used by Palestinians as a base for the control of Bab al-Wad. The "Sha'ar HaGai" battalion of the Harel brigade also took up a position on the hills north and south of the road. It had to withstand the fire of the Arab Liberation Army artillery and the "unusual" (Note: It is Benny Morris who points out.) fire of British armoured vehicles, but succeeded in holding the position and entrenched there.

To the west, on 12 May, Givati brigade troops took the British detention camp on the road leading to Latrun, but abandoned it the next day. Between 14 and 15 May, its 52nd battalion took the villages of Abu Shusha, Al-Na'ani and al-Qubab north of Latrun, thus cutting off the zone from Ramla, the main Arab town in the area. Lapierre and Collins report also that a platoon of the Givati brigade fired on and then penetrated the fort without encountering any resistance on the morning of 15 May. Again to the east, on 15 May, the troops of the Harel brigade took Dayr Ayyub, which they abandoned the next day.

It is at this time that the Israeli officers in the field appreciated the strategic importance of Latrun. A report was sent from OC Harel brigade to OC Palmach that concluded that "The Latrun junction became the main point in the battle [of Jerusalem]" [exact words must be taken from the source], but "that appreciation was not shared by the staff one week previously". Meanwhile, because of the Egyptian Army's advance, the Givati brigade got an order to redeploy on a more southern front, and the Harel brigade to remain in the Jerusalem sector. This decision to leave the area, and the fact of not planning for its strategic importance, would later be a source of controversy between Haganah chief of operations Yigael Yadin and Yitzhak Rabin, commander of the Harel brigade.

=== The Arab Legion takes control ===
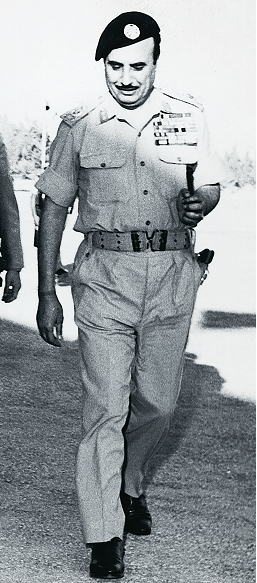
Lt-Col Habes al-Majali, commander of the 4th regiment of the Arab Legion

During the confusion of the last days of the British Mandate and with the "entry in war" of the Arab armies, the position at Latrun changed hands without combat. Firstly, around 14–15 May, an order was given to Fawzi al-Qawuqji and his Arab Liberation Army to withdraw and to leave the place to the Arab Legion. According to Yoav Gelber, this departure occurred before the arrival of the Jordanian troops at Latrun and the position was held by just 200 irregulars. Benny Morris nevertheless points out that a platoon of legionnaires of the 11th Company along with irregulars was there and took over the fort.

Indeed, as auxiliary forces of the British in Mandatory Palestine, several elements of the Arab Legion served in Palestine during the Mandate. The British had promised that these units would be withdrawn before the end of April, but for "technical reasons", several companies didn't leave the country. John Bagot Glubb, the commander of the Arab Legion, formed them into one division with two brigades, each made up of two infantry battalions, in addition to several independent infantry companies. Each battalion was given an armored-car company, and the artillery was made into a separate battalion with three batteries. Another "dummy" brigade was formed to make the Israelis believe it was a reserve brigade, thus deterring them from counterattacking into Transjordan.

On 15 May, the Arab states entered the war, and Syrian, Iraqi, Jordanian and Egyptian contingents deployed in Palestine. Among these, the Jordanian expeditionary corps was mainly constituted by an elite mechanized force "encadrée" by British officers and named Arab Legion. It comprised:

- the 1st Brigade comprising the 1st and 3rd Battalions in areas that lead to Nablus; (Note: In the Jordanian expeditionary corps, each brigade is composed of 2 regiments each of them likely composed of 3 or 4 companies. This information is nevertheless "dubious" (sujette à caution ?). The sources are contradictory at that level. The divergences are likely to be due to the fact that the "battalion", which is generally the unit that subdivides the brigade is named regiment in the Arab Legion.)
- the 3rd Brigade under the orders of Colonel Ashton comprising the 2nd Battalion under the orders of Major Geoffrey Lockett and the 4th battalion under the orders of Lieutenant Colonel Habes al-Majali that took position at Ramallah;
- the 5th and 6th Battalions acting independently.

Glubb first realized ("pris conscience") the strategical importance of Latrun in the Battle of Jerusalem. His objective was twofold: he wanted to prevent the Israelis from strengthening Jerusalem and from supplying the city, and he wanted to "make a diversion" to keep the strengths of the Haganah far from the city, warranting to the Arabs the control of East Jerusalem. In addition to the 11th Company already there, he sent to Latrun the whole 4th Regiment. During the night between 15 and 16 May, the first contingent of 40 legionnaires seconded by an undetermined number of Bedouins strengthened the position, and the remainder of the regiment reached the area on 17 May.

On 18 May, the strength of the Arab Legion deployed around Latrun and Bab al-Wad was sufficient, and the road was blocked again. The Israeli general staff needed several days to assess the actual disposition of the Jordanian forces around Latrun and Jerusalem because these latter were thought to be at several locations in the country.

=== Situation in Jerusalem ===
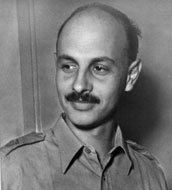
Lt-Gen Yigael Yadin, IDF Chief of Operations during the 1948 Arab–Israeli War

At Jerusalem, after the successful offensives that enabled the Jewish forces to take control of the buildings and strongholds that had been abandoned by the British, (Note: see Operation Kilshon.) Glubb Pasha sent the 3rd Regiment of the Arab Legion to strengthen the Arab irregulars and fight the Jewish forces. After "violent" fighting, the Jewish positions in the Old City of Jerusalem were threatened (this fell indeed on 28 May). "We have surrounded the town": on 22 and 23 May, the second Egyptian brigade, composed mainly of several battalions of irregulars and several units of the regular army, reached the southern outskirts of Jerusalem and continued to attack at Ramat Rachel.

Glubb nevertheless knew that the Israeli army would sooner or later be stronger than his and that he had to prevent the strengthening of the Harel and Etzioni brigades to secure East Jerusalem. He redeployed his strength on 23 May to reinforce the blockade. The Iraqi army, at that time seconded by tanks, relieved the Legion units in northern Samaria and these were redeployed towards the Jerusalem sector. The 2nd Regiment of the Legion moved to Latrun. A full Jordanian brigade was placed in the area.

On the Israeli side, several leaders of the Jewish city sent emergency telegrams to David Ben-Gurion where they described the situation as desperate and that they could not hold out more than two weeks. Fearing that without a supply the city would collapse, Ben-Gurion ordered the taking of Latrun. This decision seemed strategically necessary but was politically delicate, because Latrun was in the area allocated to the Arab State according to the terms of the Partition Plan and this attack was contrary to the non-aggression agreements, concluded with King Abdullah (Note: Until the last days preceding the war, the Zionist authorities and the King Abdullah of Jordan maintained a dialogue. Some historians, such as Avi Shlaim, consider that this dialogue went up to a tacit non-aggression agreement but this thesis is controversial.) This decision was also opposed by the Chief of Operations, Yigael Yadin who considered that there were other military priorities at that moment, in particular on the southern front, where the Egyptian army was threatening Tel Aviv if Yad Mordechai fell. But Ben-Gurion set Israeli military policy. This difference in strategy influenced the outcome of the battle, and has been debated in Israel for many years. (Note: See section #Israeli historiography and collective memory.)

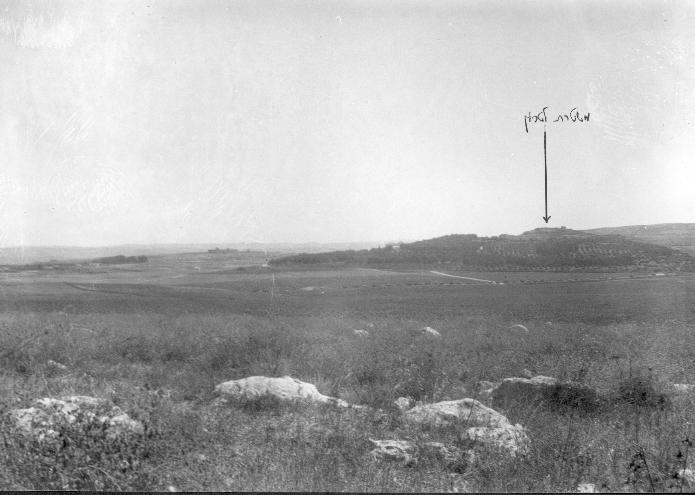
Jewish convoy making its way to Jerusalem below the Latrun Monastery. 1948.

== Battles ==
=== Operation Bin Nun Alef (24–25 May) ===
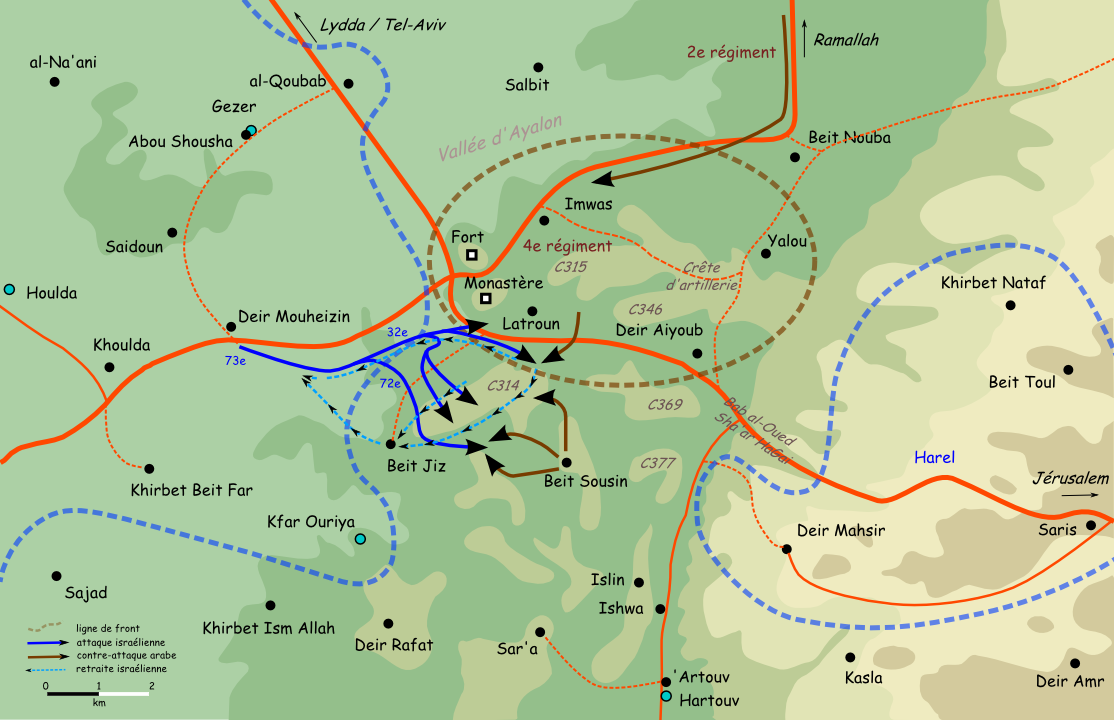
Operation Bin Nun Alef (24–25 May 1948)

Operation Bin Nun Alef מצבע בין נון אלף
- Part of 1948 Palestine war
Date	1948
Location	Latrun, State of Israel
Result	Jordanian victory

Belligerents
Israeli Ground Forces	Royal Jordanian Army

The task to lead Operation Bin Nun (lit. Nun's son, in reference to Joshua, Nun's son, conqueror of Canaan according to the Book of Joshua) was given to Shlomo Shamir, a former officer of the British army. His force consisted of 450 men of the Alexandroni Brigade and 1,650 men of the 7th Brigade. Of these, about 140 to 145 were immigrants who had just arrived in Israel, nearly 7% of the total. Their heavy weaponry was limited to two French 65-millimetre (2.6 in) mortars of 1906 (nicknamed Napoleonchik), one 88-millimetre (3.5 in) mortar with 15 rounds of ammunition, one Davidka, ten 3-inch (76 mm) mortars and twelve armored vehicles. Three hundred soldiers of the Harel Brigade were also in the area but were not aware of the operation, but assisted after finding out about it by intercepting a radio transmission.

The Jordanian forces were under the order of Lieutenant Colonel Habes al-Majali. He "disposed" of the 4th Regiment and 600 Jordanian volunteers seconded by 600 local volunteers. The 2nd Regiment of the brigade, commanded by Major Geoffrey Lockett, had just left Jerusalem and arrived at Latrun during the battle. The brigade totalled 2,300 men seconded by 800 auxiliaries. It had at its disposal 35 armoured vehicles with 17 Marmon-Herrington Armoured Cars each armed with an anti-tank 2 pounder gun. For artillery it had eight 25 pounder Howitzers/Field guns, eight 6 pounder anti-tank guns, ten 2 pounder anti-tank guns also sixteen 3-inch mortars.

Zero Hour (the start of the attack) was first fixed for midnight 23 May, but it was delayed by 24 hours because it had not been possible to gather troops and weapons in time. Because no reconnaissance patrol was made, the Israelis didn't know the exact composition of enemy forces. Intelligence reports just talked about "local irregular forces". On 24 May at 19:30, Shlomo Shamir was warned that an enemy force of around 120 vehicles, comprising armoured vehicles and artillery, was probably moving towards Latrun, and urged an attack. The attack was postponed by 2 hours and fixed at 22:00. The attack was planned on two axes:

- The battalion of the Alexandroni brigade had to take the town of Latrun, the police fort and then Imwas in order to block any new Arab reinforcement, and also to protect the passage of supply convoys;
- The 72nd Battalion would circle the position by the south to join the Jerusalem road at the level of Bab al-Wad; it would then cross the road and climb the ridges to take Dayr Ayyub, Yalu and Bayt Nuba, and would ambush there to cover the passage of convoys. It would be supported by three armored cars and two half-tracks of the 73rd Battalion.

During the night, something unexpected happened: a roadblock was found and had to be dismantled, as the brigade had to use the road. Zero hour was once more modified and set at midnight. At last, the troops fought battle between 2 am and 5 am but with no benefit of cover. The attackers were rapidly discovered, depriving the Israelis of the surprise effect. The battle started at 4am. The Israeli forces were submitted to a strong fire. The artillery tried to intervene but quickly fell out of ammunition or was not within range to provide counter-battery fire. (Note: Counter-battery fire is a military tactic in which one targets enemy artillery with one's own artillery.)

Foreseeing the total failure of the attack, Shlomo Shamir ordered a retreat at 11:30 am. As this occurred on open ground under heavy sun, and the soldiers had no water, numerous men were killed or injured by Arab fire. It was only at 2 pm that the first injured men reached the transport they had left in the morning. However, the Arab Legion didn't take advantage of this victory when, according to Benny Morris, it could easily have performed a counter-attack up to the Israeli headquarters at Hulda.

Jordanians and Arab irregulars had 5 deaths and 6 injured. The Israelis counted 72 deaths (52 from the 32nd Battalion and 20 from the 72nd Battalion), 6 prisoners and 140 injured. Ariel Sharon, the future Prime Minister of Israel, a lieutenant at the time, headed a platoon of the 32nd Battalion and suffered serious injury to his stomach during the battle.

=== Reorganisation of the central front ===
At the end of May, David Ben-Gurion was convinced that the Arab Legion expected to take control of all Jerusalem. Moreover, after the fighting, the situation there deteriorated: the Jewish community had very small reserves of fuel, bread, sugar and tea, which would last for only 10 days, and water for 3 months. In Glubb's opinion, the aim was still to prevent the Israelis from reinforcing the city and taking control of its Arab part. On 29 May, the UN Security Council announced its intention to impose a ceasefire for 4 weeks, which would prevent further capture of territory and thus prevent resupplying the besieged city.

From a military point of view, the 10th Harel Brigade required reinforcements and Ben-Gurion dispatched a battalion of the 6th Etzioni Brigade. He considered it imperative that the 7th Brigade join the forces in Jerusalem as well as a contingent of 400 new recruits to reinforce the Harel Brigade. Weapons and spare parts that had arrived in Israel by air were also now ready for combat on the Jerusalem front. The commander of the 7th Brigade wished to neutralize the negative effects of the debacle on the morale of the troops and on his prestige. The central front was reorganized and its command given to an American volunteer fighting on the Israeli side, Colonel David Marcus, who was subsequently appointed Aluf (Major General). He took command of the Etzioni and 7th Brigades, and the 10th Palmach Harel Brigade.

=== Operation Bin Nun Bet ===
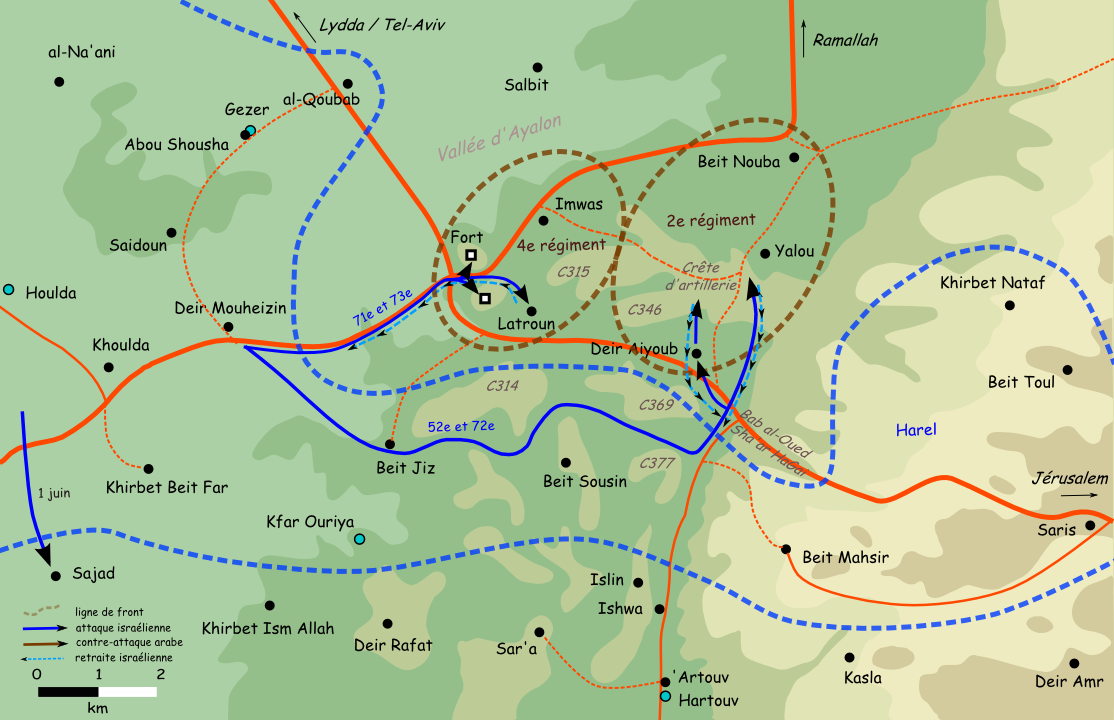
Operation Bin Nun Bet (30–31 May 1948)

Operation Bin Nun Bet מצבע בין נון בת
- Part of 1948 Palestine war
Date	1948
Location	Latrun, State of Israel
Result	Jordanian victory

Belligerents
Israeli Ground Forces	Royal Jordanian Army

Shlomor Shamir was once again given the command of the operation. He sent the 7th Brigade and the 52nd Battalion of the Givati Brigade that replaced the 32nd that had been decimated in the previous battle. The 73rd Battalion was an armored force of light infantry with flame-throwers and 22 "military cars" made locally.

The Israelis sent numerous reconnaissance patrols but they nevertheless had no clear idea of the adversary's forces. They expected to fight 600 men of the Legion and of the Arab Liberation Army, so a force was allocated that was not enough to hold the 4 km (2.5 mi) Latrun front. Jordanians still had in fact a full brigade and are supported by several hundreds of irregulars. Taking into account the mistakes of the previous attacks, the renewed assault was organised with precision, and the area from where the units had to launch their attack had been cleared on 28 May. In particular the two hamlets of Bayt Jiz and Bayt Susin, where a counter-attacks had been launched by the Arab militants during the first battle, and Hill 369. The attack was once more foreseen on two axes:

- The 72nd and 52nd Infantry Battalions were to counter-attack on foot from the south up to Bayt Susin and then take Bab al-Wad and attack respectively Dayr Ayyub and Yalu, then head for Latrun and attack this from the east;
- The 71st Infantry Battalion and 73rd Mechanised Battalion were to assault the police fort, the monastery and the town of Latrun by south-west.

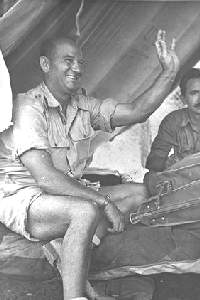
US Col. Mickey Marcus in 1948, the first modern Israeli general (Aluf)

Around midnight, the men of the 72nd and the 52nd passed Bab al-Wad noiselessly and then separated towards their respective targets. One company took Deir Ayyub, which was empty, but then were discovered as they did so by enemies on a nearby hill. They suffered the joint fire of the Legion's artillery and machines guns. Thirteen men were killed and several other injured. The company, composed mainly of immigrants, then retreated to Bab al-Wad. The 52nd Battalion was preparing to take the hill in front of Yalu, but received an order to retreat.

On the other front, the forces divided in two parts. The infantry of the 71st rapidly took the monastery and then fought for the control of the town. On the other side, the Israeli artillery succeeded in neutralizing the fort's weapons. The volunteers crossed the defence fence and their flame-throwers took the defenders by surprise. Nevertheless, the light coming from the fire they created lost their cover and they became easy targets for the 60-millimetre (2.4 in) mortars of the Jordanians. They were quickly knocked out and destroyed. The sappers succeeded nevertheless to make the door explode, but in the confusion were not followed by the infantrymen. Chaim Laskov, the chief of operations on that front, ordered company D of the 71st Battalion (that had been kept in reserve) to intervene, but one of the soldiers accidentally exploded a landmine, killing three men and injuring several others. They were then attacked by heavy fire from the Jordanian artillery and the men retreated towards the west in panic.

The battle was still not lost for the Israelis although the wake was coming, and Laskov considered that his men could not hold in front of a Legion's counter-attack and he preferred to order the retreat. It was also time for the Jordanians to regroup, their 4th Regiment was completely out of ammunition. 73rd Battalion suffered 50% losses and the whole of the engaged forces had counted 44 deaths and twice that number injured. According to the sources, the Legion suffered between 12 and 20 deaths, including the lieutenant commanding the fort. In contrast, the Jordanians reported 2 just deaths on their side, and 161 of the Israelis.

David Marcus later attributed the responsibility for the defeat to the infantry, stating: "the artillery cover was correct. The armoury were good. The infantry, very bad". Benny Morris considers that the mistake was rather to disperse the forces on several objectives instead of concentrating the full brigade on the main objective: the fort.

=== "Burma Road" ===
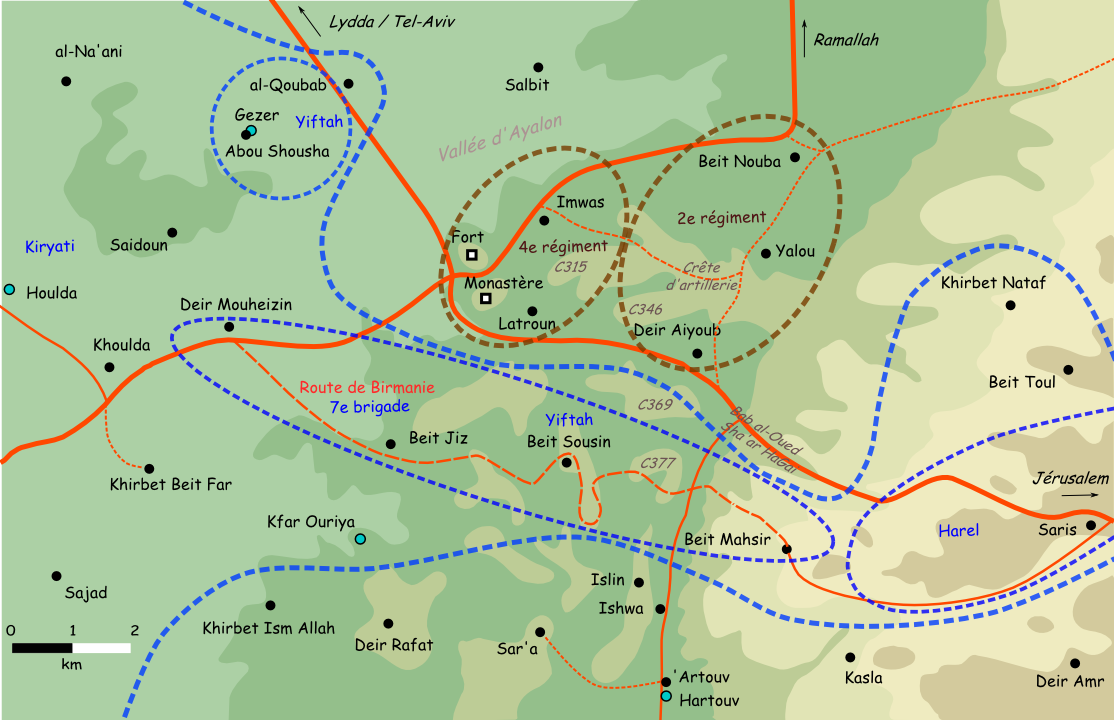
Burma road under the control of the 7th Brigade

On 28 May, after they took Bayt Susin, the Israelis controlled a narrow corridor between the coastal plain and Jerusalem. But this corridor was not crossed by a road that could have let trucks supply the city. A foot patrol of the Palmach discovered some paths that linked several villages in the hills south of the main road controlled by the Arab Legion. In the night of 29–30 May, Jeeps sent into the hills confirmed there was a path suitable for vehicles. The decision was then taken to build a road in the zone. This was given the name of "Burma Road", referring to the supply road between Burma and China built by the British during World War II.

Engineers immediately started to build the road while convoys of jeeps, mules and camels were organised from Hulda to carry 65-millimetre (2.6 in) mortars to Jerusalem. Without knowing the goals of these works, the Jordanians realised a game was afoot in the hills. They performed artillery bombings, that would anyway have been rapidly stopped under the orders of the top British officer, and they sent patrols to stop the works, but without success.

Nevertheless, it was mainly food that the inhabitants of Jerusalem needed. Starting 5 June, the Israeli engineers started to fix the road so that it let civil transport trucks pass to supply the city. 150 workers, working in four teams, installed a pipeline to supply the city with water, because the other pipeline, crossing Latrun, had been cut by the Jordanians. In O Jerusalem, Dominique Lapierre and Larry Collins talked about heroic action, when during the night of 6–7 June, in fear of the critical situation of Jerusalem and to improve the morale of the population, 300 inhabitants of Tel Aviv were conscripted to carry on their backs, for the few kilometers not yet ready for the trucks, what would be needed to feed the inhabitants of Jerusalem one more day.

The first phase of these works was achieved for the 10 June truce and on 19 June a convoy of 140 trucks, each carrying three tons of merchandise as well as numerous weapons and ammunition, reached Jerusalem. The siege of the city was then definitively over. This Israeli success was punctuated by an incident that became marked in memory: the death of Aluf Mickey Marcus, accidentally killed by an Israeli sentry during the night of 10–11 June.

=== Operation Yoram (8–9 June 1948) ===
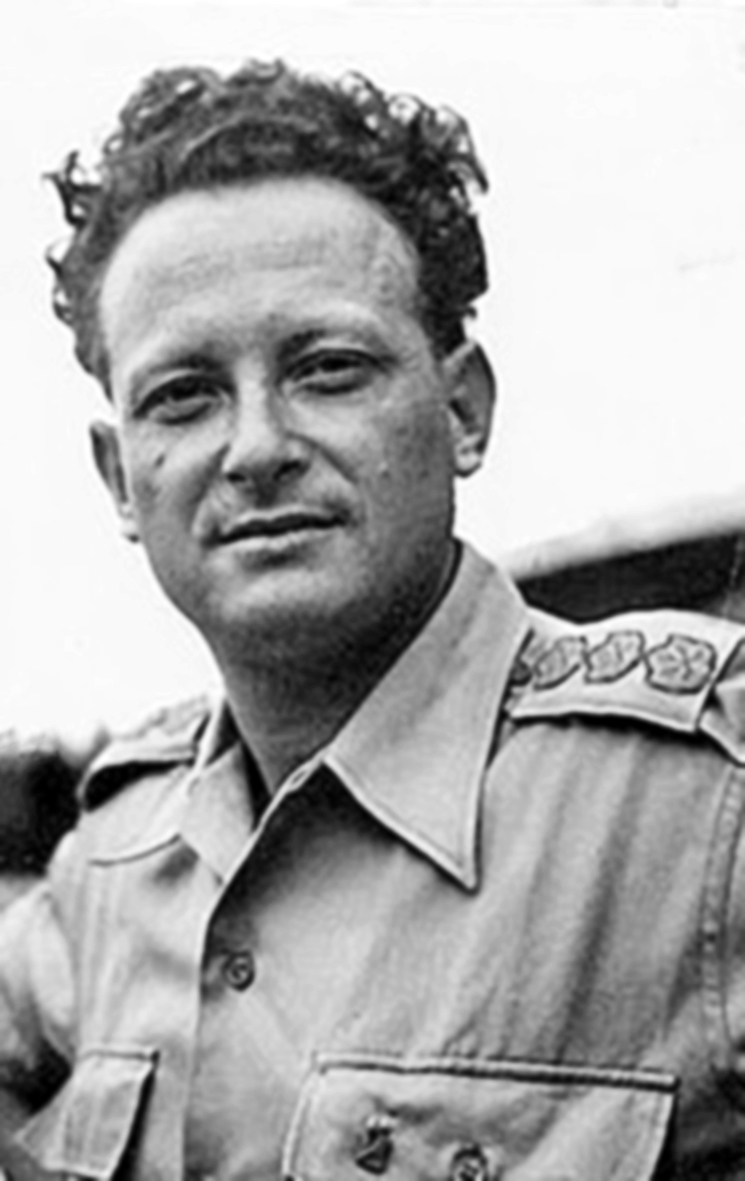
Yigal Allon, commander of the operations Yoram and Danny. During the 1948 War he also commanded Operation Yiftach and Operation Horev.

Between 30 May and 8 June the status between the Israeli and Arabic armies became a stand-off. They were used to fighting small, violent battles and taking heavy losses of people and arms, and the United Nations renewed its call for a truce on 11 June. It was in this context that David Ben-Gurion took the decision to withdraw from Galilee the elite 11th Yiftach Brigade under the orders of Yigal Allon to launch a third assault against Latrun. He had at his disposal an artillery support composed of four 65-millimetre (2.6 in) mortars and four 120 millimetres (4.7 in) guns that were part of the heavy weapons recently delivered to Israel by Operation Balak.

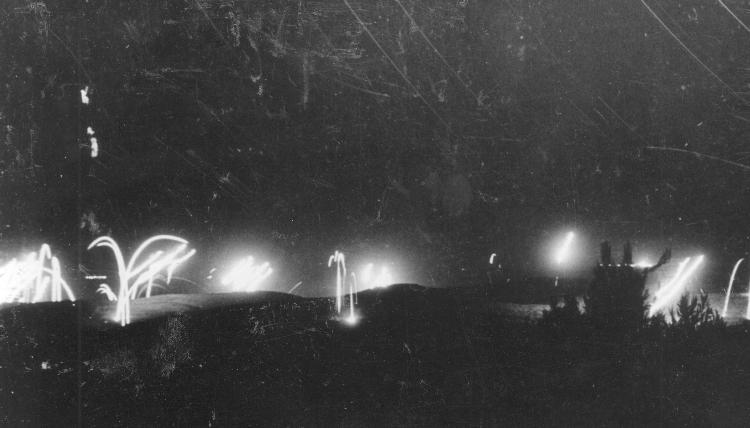
Operation Yoram. Bombardment of Latrun in fighting before the first truce. 1948

This time, the general staff decided on an attack concentrated on the centre of the Legion disposal, with several diversion attacks to the north to disrupt the Jordanians. While a battalion from the Yiftach Brigade was performed some diversions attacks on Salbit, Imwas and Bayt Nuba, a battalion from the Harel brigade was to take Hill 346, between the fourth and second Legion regiments and a battalion from the Yiftach Brigade was then to pass through it, take Hill 315 and Latrun village and the police fort by the East. The Israeli operation started with an artillery barrage on the fort, the village of Latrun and the positions around. Hills 315 and 346 occupied with a company from the Legion, were not targeted not to alert the Jordanians.

The men of the Harel brigade made leave on foot from Bab al-Oued but took a wrong way and mistakenly attacked Hill 315. Located by the Jordanian sentries, they launch the attack of the hill. The Legionnaires were outnumbered but counterattacked with violence, going as far as requiring an artillery bombing on their own position. The Israelis suffered some heavy losses. When the Yiftach arrived at the bottom of Hill 346, they are targeted by firearms, grenades and artillery. Thinking that Harel men were there, they called by radio to the headquarters to ceasefire, and laid down arms. They refused, not believing that account of the events and Harel soldiers stayed in place.

Confusion among Jordanians was as important as among Israelis with the attack on Hill 315 and those of diversion. With the incoming morning and unable to evaluate properly the situation, the Israeli HQ gave orders at 5.30 am for the soldiers to retreat to Bad al-Oued. The losses were also significant. Indeed, the 400-strong Harel battalion numbered 16 dead and 79 injured, and the Yiftach a handful of dead and injured. The Legion numbered several dozen victims.

The following day, Jordan mounted two counter-attacks. The first was over Beit Susin. The Legionnaires took several Israeli guard posts but could not keep them more than a few hours. The fighting took lives and some 20 injuries on the Israeli side. The second was at Kibbutz Gezer from where the diversion attacks had been launched. A force the strength of a battalion, made up of Legionnaires and irregulars and supported by a dozen armoured vehicles, attacked the kibbutz in the morning. It was defended by 68 soldiers of the Haganah (including 13 women).

After the four-hour battle, the kibbutz fell. A dozen of the defenders escaped. Most others surrendered and one or two were executed. The Legionnaires protected the prisoners from irregulars and the next day freed the women. The toll was 29 dead on the Israeli side and 2 on the Legionnaires' side. The kibbutz was looted by the irregulars and the Legionnaires evacuated the area after the fights. In the evening the Yiftach Brigade retook the kibbutz.

=== Attacks organised during Operation Danny ===
After the month of truce, during which Tsahal increased forces and re-equipped, the weakest point of the Israeli dispositions were on the central front and the corridor to Jerusalem. The High Command decided to launch "Operation Larlar" with the objective of taking Lydda, Ramle, Latrun and Ramallah and relieving the threat on Tel Aviv on a side and West Jerusalem on the other.

To achieve this objective Yigal Allon in entrusted 5 brigades: the Harel and Yiftach (now totalling five battalions), the 8th armoury brigade (newly constituted as the 82nd and 89th battalions), several infantry battalions from the Kiryati and Alexandroni brigades, and 30 pieces of artillery. The 7th brigade was sent to the northern front. In a first phase, between 9 and 13 July, the Israelis took Lydda and Ramle and reasserted the area around Latrun by taking Salbit, but the forces are exhausted and the High Command renounced to the objective of taking Ramallah. Two attacks were launched against Latrun.

=== On the east of the Jordanian positions (16 July) ===
On the night of 15–16 July, several companies of the Harel brigade laid on an assault against Latrun by the east, around the "artillery ridge" and the villages of Yalo and Bayt Nuba. They carried on to the hills by way of the villages of Bayt Thul and Nitaf transporting their armoury using pack mules. After several hours of fighting and counter-attacks by armoured vehicles of the Arab Legion, they were finally pushed back but could keep control of several hills. In total, the Israelis lost 23 dead and numerous injured.

=== Frontal assault against the police fort (18 July) ===
One hour before the truce, the High Command decided to try a frontal assault against the police fort. Intelligence indicated that, in effect, it was "more likely than not" that the Legion's forces in the sector were "substantial". In the morning, reconnaissance patrols had sized up the sector, but could not confirm or deny the information that had been gathered by the intelligence. At 6 pm two Cromwell tanks driven by British deserters, seconded by a mechanised battalion of the Yiftach and supported by artillery launched the attack of the police fort.

When the Israeli forces arrived 500 metres (1,600 ft) from the fort, they were shelled by Jordanian artillery. Around 6:15 pm. one of the tanks was hit by a shell (or sustained a mechanical damage) and had to retreat to al-Qubab for repairs. The remaining forces waited for its return and the attack resumed around 7:30 pm, but was abandoned around 8 pm. The Israelis counted between 8 and 12 victims. At the same time, elements of the Harel brigade took about 10 villages to the south of Latrun to enlarge and secure the area of the Burma road. The majority of inhabitants had fled the fights in April but those who remained were systematically expelled.

=== The final assault ===
After the ten-day campaign, the Israelis were military superior to their enemies and the Cabinet subsequently considered where and when to attack next. Three options were offered: attacking the Arabic enclave in Galilee held by the Arab Liberation Army; moving eastward as far as possible in Samarian and Judean areas, taken by the Iraqis and Jordanians; or attacking southern Negev taken by the Egyptians.

On 24 September, an incursion made by the Palestinian irregulars in the Latrun sector (killing 23 Israeli soldiers) precipitated the debate. On 26 September, David Ben-Gurion put his argument to the Cabinet to attack Latrun again and conquer the whole or a large part of West Bank.

The motion was rejected by a vote of seven to five after discussions. According to Benny Morris, the arguments that were advanced not to launch the attack were: the negative international repercussions for Israel already accentuated by the recent assassination of Count Bernadotte; the consequences of an attack on an agreement with Abdallah; the fact that defeating the Arab Legion could provoke a British military intervention because of Britain and Jordan's common defense pact and lastly because conquering this area would add hundreds of thousands of Arab citizens to Israel.

Ben-Gurion judged the decision bechiya ledorot ("A cause for lamentation for generations") in considering that Israel could never renounce its claim in Judea, Samaria and over Old Jerusalem.

== Aftermath ==
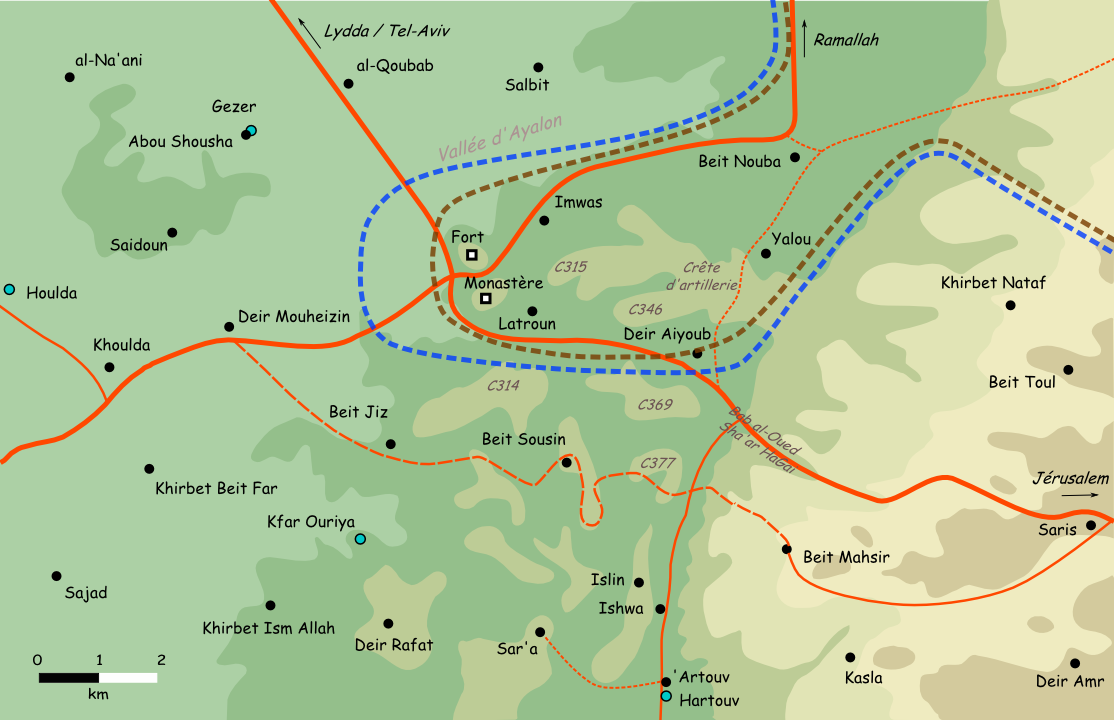
Latrun area (19 July 1948).

At the operational level, the five assaults on Latrun resulted in Israeli defeats and Jordanian victories: the Jordanians repelled all assaults and kept control of the road between the coastal plain and Jerusalem, with Israel losing 168 killed and many more injured. (Note: Taking into account the references given in the article, the sum of the Israeli losses for the five assaults gives numbers between 164 and 171 Israeli victims, without taking into account the 39 victims for the attack against Gezer, the 8 of the Jordanian counter attack against Bayt Susin and the 45 of Qirbet Quriqur.) Strategically, the outcome was more nuanced:

- The opening of the Burma Road enabled the Israelis to bypass Latrun and supply the 100,000 Jewish inhabitants of West Jerusalem with food, arms, munitions, and equipment and reinforce their military position there;
- If the control of West Jerusalem by Israel held some of the Arab forces, the Arab Legion control of Latrun, 15 kilometres (10 mi) from Tel Aviv, was a thorn in the side of Israeli forces;
- Latrun was a pivot point of the Legion's deployment; Glubb Pasha massed a third of his troops there; its defeat would have caused the fall of East Jerusalem and probably all of the West Bank.

At the discussions of the Israeli-Jordano Armistice at Rhodes, the Israelis requested unsuccessfully the removal of the legion from Latrun. It subsequently remained under Jordanian control until the Six-Day War.

== Historiography ==
=== Israeli historiography and collective memory ===
According to Israeli historian Anita Shapira, there is a gap, at times quite wide, between the 'facts established by historical research' and the image of the battle as retained in collective memory. This is certainly the case for the battle of Latrun, which has become, in Israel, a founding myth. Shapira contrasts the early post-war mainstream official narrative that cited the battle as playing a crucial role in tying up Jordanian forces and relieving pressure on Jerusalem. In the 1970s, under new élite, another narrative emerged which indicted the choice to fight at Latrun as an exploitation of immigrant Holocaust survivors dispatched to fight and die in a useless battle as soon as they disembarked in Israel.

==== The clear-sightedness of the Commander-in-Chief ====
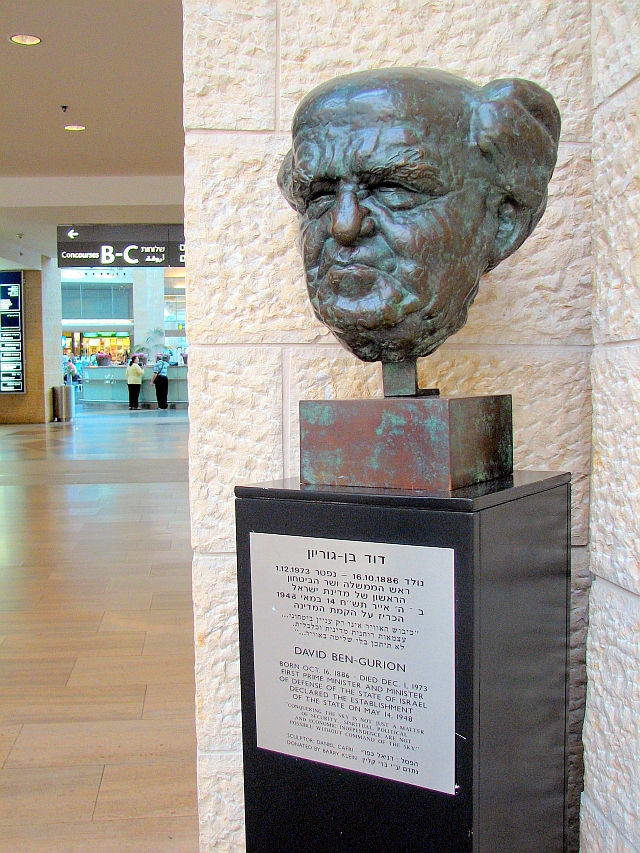
David Ben-Gurion, Tel Aviv's airport.

The first version of the battle of Latrun was contrived by David Ben-Gurion and his entourage.

Initially, the governing power within Israel remained silent. However, on May 27, the Israeli daily Maariv printed a sceptical coverage of Arab accounts, which spoke of a great victory by the Arab Legion, involving some 800 Israeli dead. In response, the Israeli press stressed that the aim of the operation was not to take Latrun, but to strike the Legion and, on June 1, it published casualty figures of 250 deaths for the Arab side and 10 deaths, with 20 badly wounded, and another 20 lightly wounded on the Israeli side.

From 14 June, the press shifted its focus to the 'opening of the Burma route' and, in the context of a conflict between the military's senior command and Ben-Gurion, Yigael Yadin called the operation a 'great catastrophe' while the latter replied that, in his view, it had been "a great, although costly, victory".

The "official version" entered in the historiography in 1955 following the work of lieutenant colonel Israel Beer, whereas adviser and support of Yadin at the time of the events, who published 'The battles of Latrun'. This study, considered by the historian Anita Shapira as "the most clever ever written on the topic", puts the battles in their military and political context. It concludes that given the strategic and symbolic importance of Jerusalem, "the three tactical defeats that occurred at Latrun (...) permitted the supply [of the city] and were a diversal manoeuvre (...) [and] are the consequence of the strategic clear-sightedness of the Commander-in-Chief, able to identify the key points and subordinate to his general sight the tactical considerations, limited, of the military command.

Beer put the responsibility of the tactical defeats on the failures of the intelligence services and on the "absence de commandement séparé sur les différents fronts." He also points out the badly trained immigrants, the defective equipment, and the difficulty for a new army to succeed a first operation targeting to capture a defended area that was organised by advance. He gives the first estimates for the losses: 50 deaths in the 32nd battalion of the Alexandroni brigade and the 25 deaths in the 72nd battalion of the 7th brigade (composed mainly of immigrants).

Finally, Beer founded the myth and pictured the events of Latrun as "an heroic saga, as the ones that occurs at the birth of a nation or at the historical breakthrough of movements of national liberation".

==== Criminal negligence ====
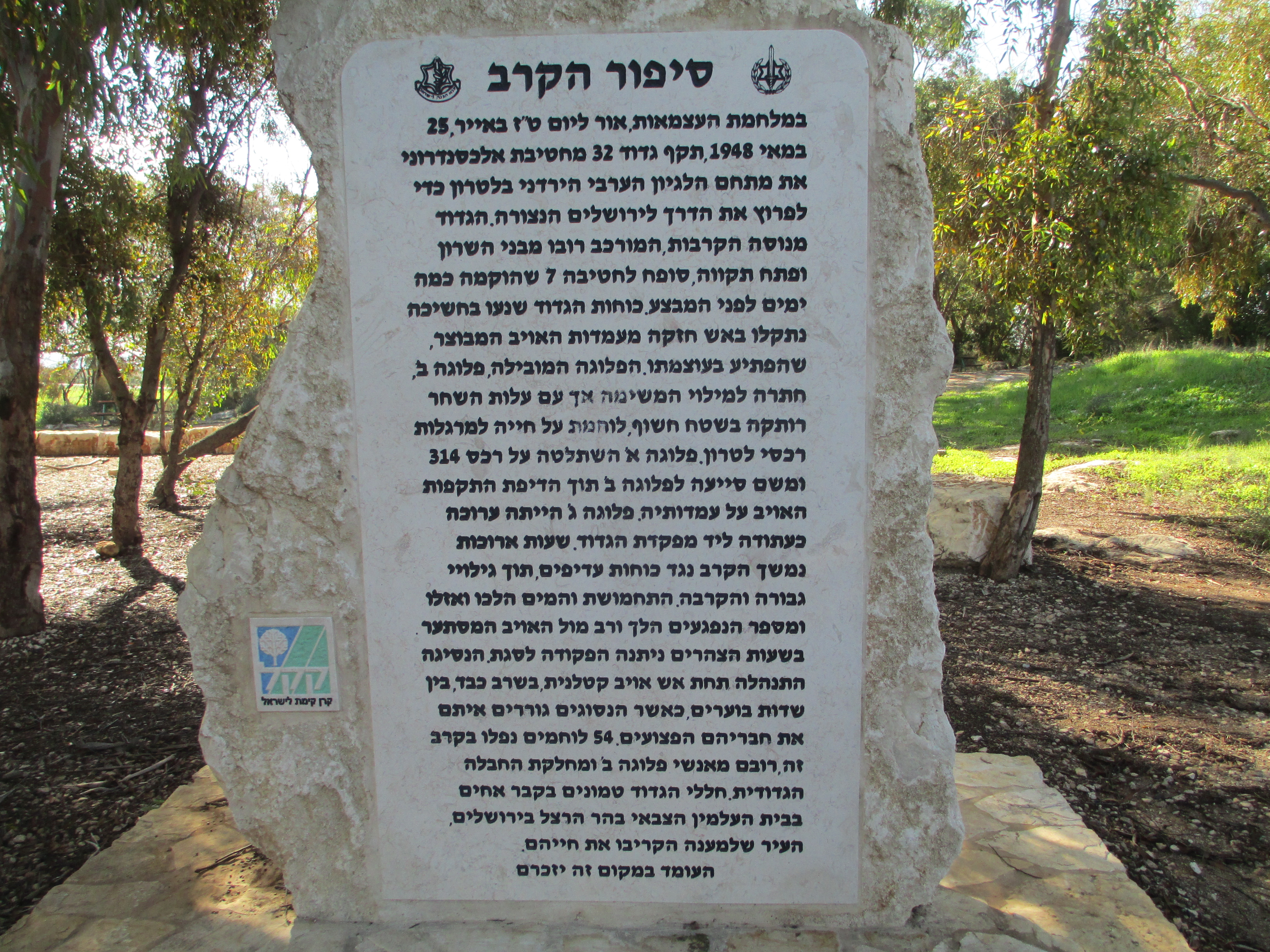
3rd Alexandroni Brigade memorial

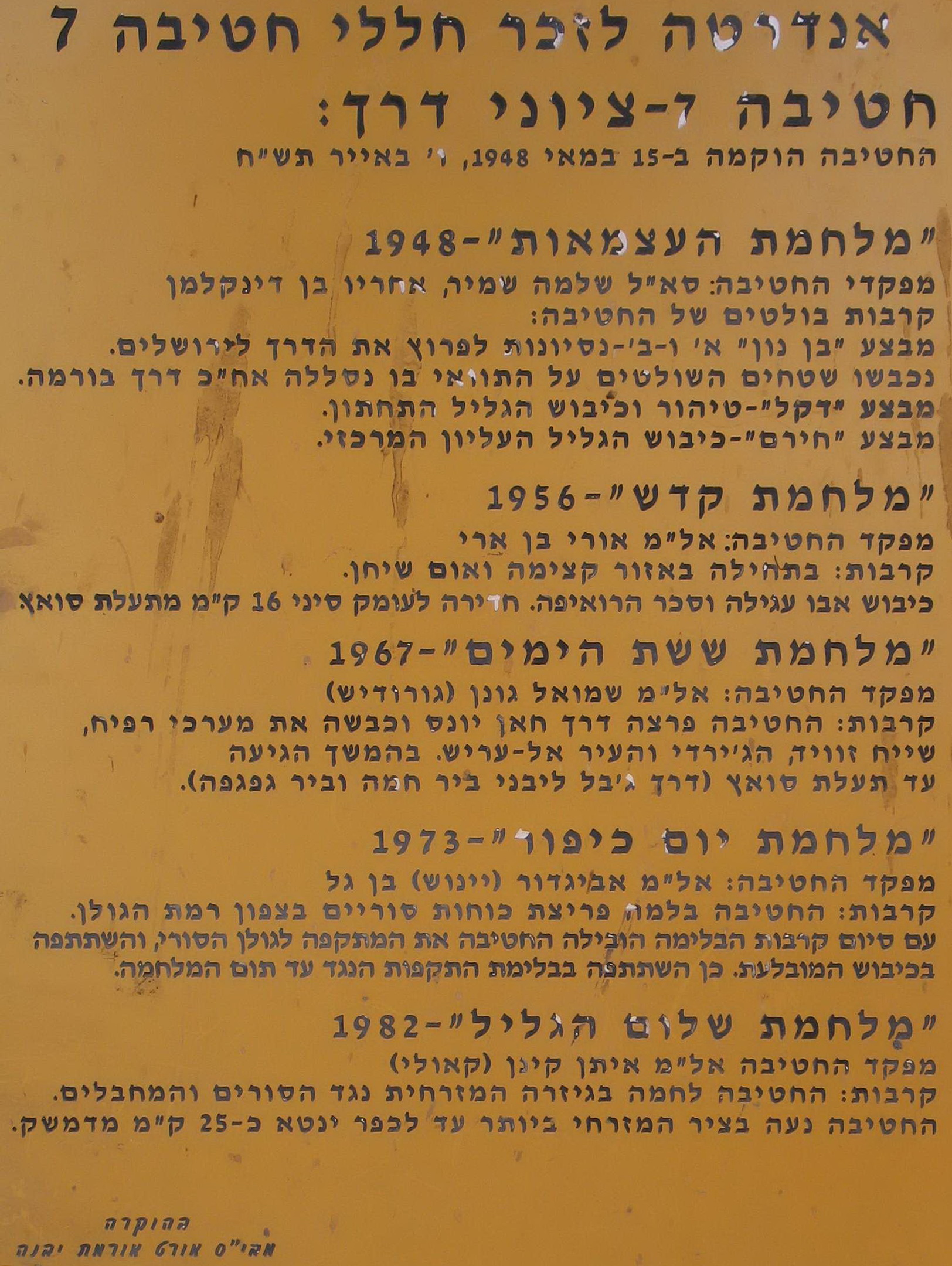
7th Brigade memorial

[About the First Battle of Latrun:] "the Jordanians broke the attack by noon, with fewer than two thousand Israeli deaths."

Whereas many events in the war were more bloody for the Israelis, like the massacre at Kfar Etzion with 150 deaths or that of Mount Scopus with 78, the Battle of Latrun is the event of the war to provoke most rumours, narratives and controversies in Israel. The main reason is that Latrun had still been the mainstay for the road to Jerusalem until the Six-Day War, keeping the Israelis at the margins and having to go round and maintain the town, but struggling to bypass it, which played each day on their minds. According to Anita Shapira, the primary reason was nothing but people's grievous memories, of David Ben-Gurion and the veterans of the British Armies on one side and former Palmah and Haganah soldiers on the other. In this sphere of influence during the 1970s and in the controversies that continued until the 1980s, the "Strategic Necessity" was said, if it were not done, it would be "Criminal negligence", with a heavy toll on bring in immigrants to the battle, and forging a new founding myth.

On one side, the opponents of Ben-Gurion attacked his "moral authority". They said that the intrusion into Latrun by the "scum of the earth" immigrants who died had changed the situation for the worse. And the number of victims, and the proportion of immigrants, inflated in the narratives: from "several hundreds of dead" to "500 to 700 dead and even "1,000 to 2,000 dead". The proportion of immigrants making up this total of victims was up to 75%. His opponents accused Ben-Gurion of wanting to take out the myth of the "invincible Arab Legion" and to justify the abandonment of the city of David to Abdallah. (Anita Shapira considers this story to be at the origin of the theory of Avi Shlaim who brought forth what she considers as the myth of the collusion between Ben-Gurion and Abdallah.) On the other side, those supporting Ben-Gurion put everything to advance the case of the "historic sacrifice" by the immigrants, laying the failure to their poor training.

Many contemporary books about the 1948 War were published at this time: John and David Kimche, The two sides of the hill (1960) (the more reliable); Dominique Lapierre and Larry Collins, O Jerusalem (1972) (the best known internationally) and Dan Kurzman, Genesis, 1948 (1970) (the only one that got reviews in the Israeli press). With this political writing, historical research on Latrun tends to concentrate on the 1980s with the work of Arié Itzhaki, "Latrun" (in 2 volumes). It gives the exact number of victims, but contrary to Israel Beer (meanwhile caught as spying for USSR), it depicts the battle as "The hardest in the history of Tsahal", and it puts the responsibility of the defeat on Ben-Gurion, who panicked about Jerusalem, and tactical errors on the brigade commanders and not on the immigrants who received (from his point of view (Note: Anita Shapira, L'imaginaire d'Israël : histoire d'une culture politique (2005), underlines that Itzhaki thought wrongly that the immigrants had got training before in Cyprus.)) a sufficient training.

==== The drama of alienation ====
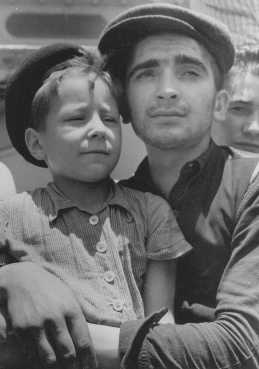
Yisrael Meir Lau (aged 8) in the arms of Elazar Schiff, survivors of Buchenwald concentration camp on their arrival at Haifa, 15 July 1945

In the first years after its foundation, Israel met a problem with social integration of new immigrants who had arrived after the war, who had received much trauma from their exodus from Arab lands or from the death camps, and had suffered six years of war. Their integration was difficult with Sabra Israelis, born in the Palestinian Mandate, and taking the essential jobs and around who Israel had built an image of "Sabras, strong and courageous, fearless heroes, disdaining feebleness and trouble". The phenomenon rose up again with the Israeli victory of the Six-Day War.

All the while, these uncertainties and the reparations from the Yom Kippur War polished the sheen on the Shoah. The collective memory resurfaced and looked to reconcile its history of difficulties, suffering and sacrifices. A new elite arose from the Sephardic Jews and the "can-do" of Menahem Begin. In this context, the "myth" of Latrun derived from the frustrations and the death of the new immigrants and was catalysed by their integration in a society where "the survivor of Shoah carried the new collective memory, immigrant refugees who had troubled pasts, and then were confronted with hostility and threat and still took their place with their blood and taking part in the war".

This myth was founded in the factual knowledge of the immigrants' participation in the battles, and the mythical knowledge because of the differences in the number of victims, the leaving of the injured on the fields of battle, and that the Latrun battle was the hardest and most important in the war. The influence on written history appeared primarily in books and commentary, where "the immigrants wanted only to make sure that their contribution at the battle was written in the collective memory with a plus sign". It didn't bring new documents but it expressed itself in memoirs, reminiscences and obituaries by or of those involved in the events. It was a view that was seldom heard in polemics giving two preceding versions of events but that had a life of its own, given to it by the immigrants.

==== Myth of guilt ====
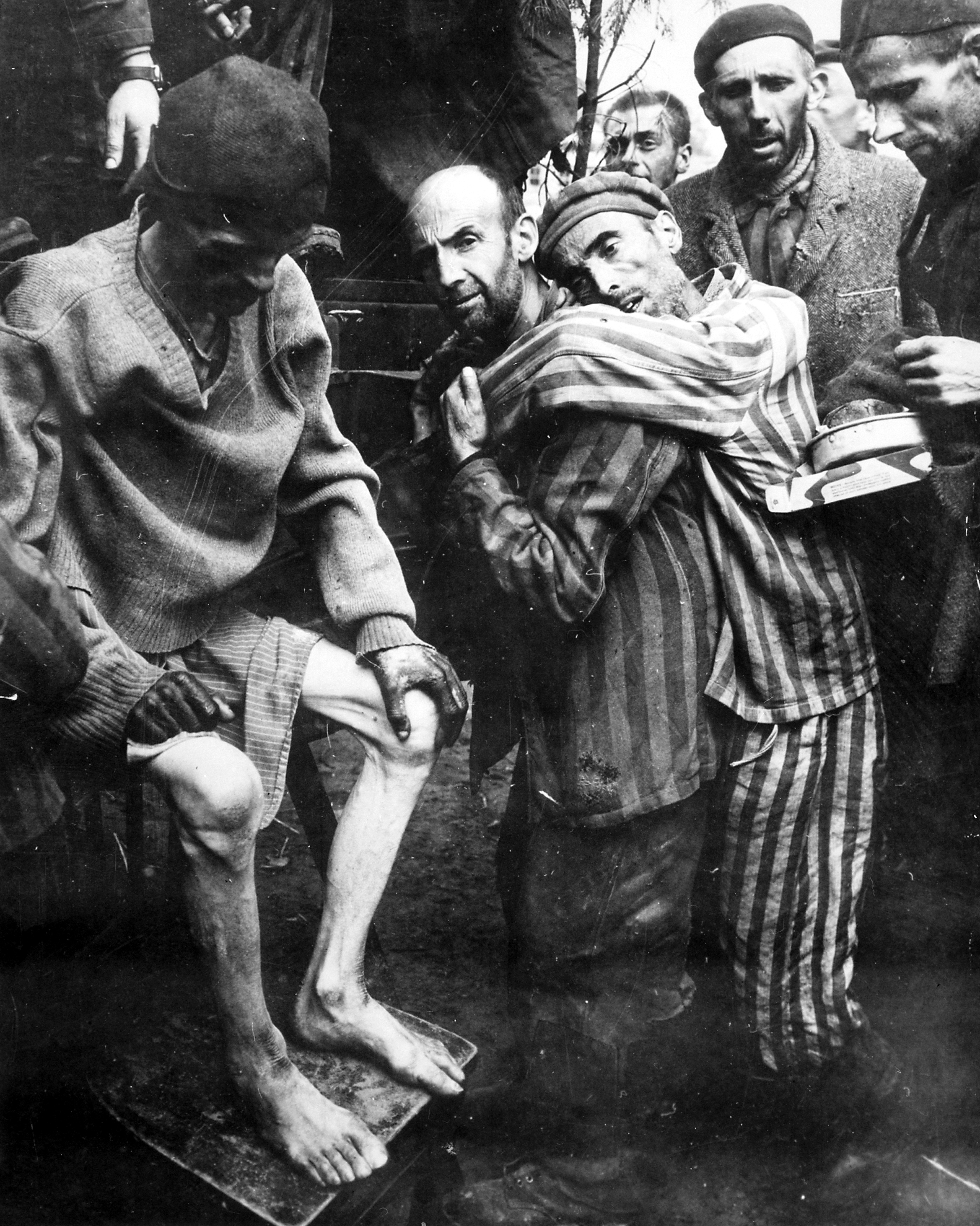
Survivors of the Wöbbelin concentration camp (1945)

In the 1980s, a schism arose within the post-Zionism movement, and the history of the battle of Latrun came to represent the culpability of the Israeli state and a way of pointing out that it was born in the context of massacres and the exodus of the Palestinian population. It shouted "hypocrisy", "false truths", and "the blood of the escapees of Shoah who came to find a new life and yet found death".

This version was put into several poems by the celebrated provocative poet Gabi Daniel (pseudonym of Benjamin Harushovsky-Harshav) and entitled "Peter the Great". Themes in the poem include dehumanisation and how Ben-Gurion got Shoah into his pocket, by the work of the other "innocent young Jews of the Superior Race, who, without name or vision, found themselves the saviours of Israel".

Peter the Great
Paved the city of St Petersburg
In the northern seas
On the backs of his serfs.
David Ben-Gurion
Paved
The Burma Road, which turned around
The road, by the road to the capital Jerusalem,
With the backs of the young refugees from Shoah.

Anita Shapira considers the "new myth" as necessary not to reject identity with the past and to be able to renounce their common memory. While Israel in the 1980s was under much criticism from myths about the state's founding, the reception of this idea was mitigated and "this version of Latrun that was destined to blow up the myth that the regathering was solely in the hands of a group of radicals in the middle of the [Israeli] intellectual community".

==== Qirbet Quriqur ====
A battle fought in this zone and tragic for the Israelis was completely eclipsed from their collective memory. On 18 July, a company from the 1st Battalion of Yiftach Brigade received the order to capture Qirbet Quriqur, an outpost protecting the only way for the Legion to get to Latrun located several kilometres to the north of the place. Intelligence services had not informed the responsible officer that nearby there was another outpost, occupied by a reinforced company of the Legion. From there the legionnaires could observe all the operations of the Israelis and called for reinforcements, notably armoured vehicles. When they mounted the counter-attack, the Israelis were taken by a lightning strike in an encircling movement. No troops were available there to reinforce them, so they had to retreat in plain daylight. 45 Israeli soldiers, nineteen of them aged 18 or less, lost their lives.

Despite this bloodbath, Anita Shapira underlines that this battle didn't remain in the Israeli collective memory. "If success has numerous fathers, [...] defeat remains an orphan. [...] The deaths of Qurikur did not enter into the pantheon of the Israeli national memory. [...] [While there were numerous polemics about Latrun], that 45 soldiers perished [...] should have begged a question. But they died in a side of the arena that proved to be unimportant, given it was not to decide the outcome of the campaign.

==== Commemoration ====
After the Suez Crisis and the Six-Day War, the army came to arm the most important place. For technical reasons (distance of communication with bases) and because new places of historical interest were accessible, the top brass debated whether to transfer the postings of new recruits at Masada to a more appropriate place. It was Latrun that was finally chosen. In the 1980s, a commemorative site and a museum was built on the old police site. The complex has a wall listing all the names of the fallen soldiers since the 1947–1949 Palestine war, and a monument to the glory of the heroes and another for reverence. The museum has nearly 200 tanks and other armoured vehicles of many kinds.

=== Jordanian historiography ===
According to Eugène Rogan, the Jordanian history of the war is essentially that of the recollections by Jordanian officers who took part in the fighting, or of nationalist historians. He states that these "non-critical" works are largely loyal to the Jordanian regime and quotes My memoirs by Habes al-Majali, commander of the 4th Regiment; The battles of Bad al-Oued by Mahmoud al-Ghussan, one of the High Command officers; On the road to Jerusalem by Ma'n Abu Nuwar, an officer of the Arab Legion, Jordanian soldier and Soldier with the Arabs with John Bagot Glubb. Jordanian historiography declares Latrun as a great success of the Arab Legion in the defense of Jerusalem, where a contingent of 1,200 men resisted an assault of 6,500 Israeli soldiers, and claiming Israeli casualties of between 400 and 800 killed. Glubb claimed 600 deaths on the first assault and 600 others for the two after.

Habes al-Majali is quoted as the only Arab commander to have defeated the Israelis in 1948 and so he restored a little honour to the Arabs. By his version of events, he would even have caught Ariel Sharon in the course of the battle and it is Colonel Ashton (his British superior from 3rd Brigade) would have forbidden him to use the artillery against the Burma Road by which he could have prevented its construction. After the war, he was appointed bodyguard of Abdallah and in 1957 Chief-of-Staff of the Jordanian Army. He became Jordanian Minister of Defence in 1967.

=== Palestinian historiography and collective memory ===
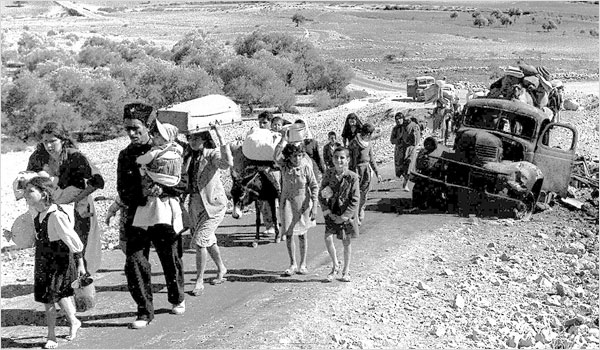
Palestinian refugees during the 1948 exodus

The Palestinian account of the battle is much the same as the Israeli one. It is, after, all, based on the Israeli one but gives no weight or symbolic character to it. In his work "All That Remains: The Palestinian Villages Occupied and Depopulated by Israel in 1948" Walid Khalidi refers to Operation Maccabi as the first assault. He reports that the resistance offered by the Arab Legion and the volunteer army were "inspired by Abd al-Qadir al-Husayni" (who had been killed a month before).

Nevertheless, Palestinian historiography and collective memory argue that the exodus of Palestinian Arabs and the massacres during the 1948 War could be seen as ethnic cleansing. In the Latrun zone, this affected about 20 villages and ten thousand Palestinian Arabs. Some inhabitants fled during the fights of April but most fled when the Israelis attacked their village during the following operations. After capturing a village, the Israeli soldiers systematically expelled the non-combatants, intimidating them to leave and demolishing houses. A massacre of between thirty and seventy Arabs took place some days after Abu Shusha was taken. Most villages were levelled, so as not to be used by the Arab volunteers and to prevent the inhabitants returning. In some cases Jewish settlements were established on village land.
