= Georg Beer =

Georg Beer may refer to:

- Georg Joseph Beer (1763–1821), Austrian ophthalmologist
- Georg Beer, a pseudonym of Israel Beer (1912–1966), Austrian-Israeli author and spy
