= Bayt Susin =

Bayt Susin بَيْت سُوسِين
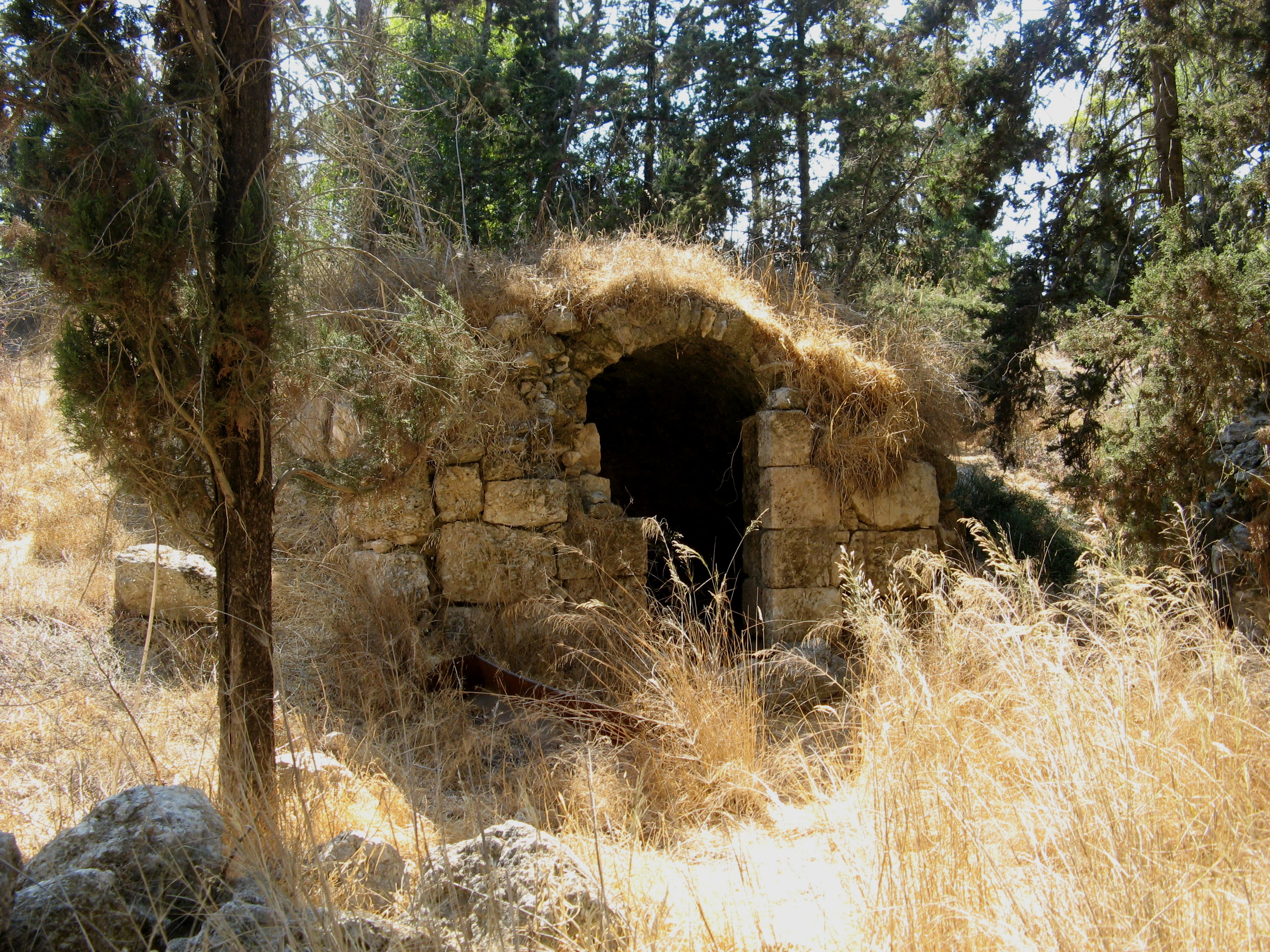
- Ruins in Bayt Susin
- Etymology: The house of Susin
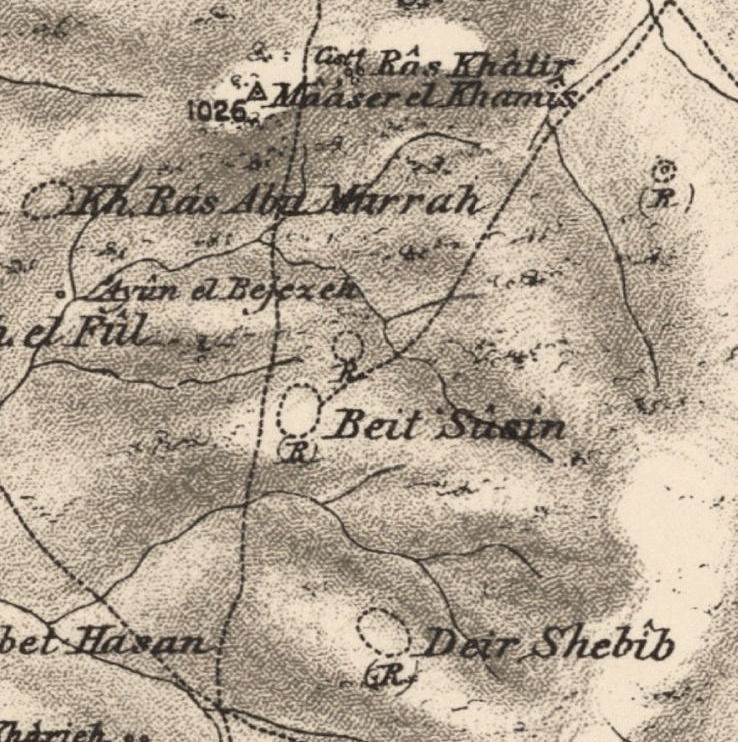
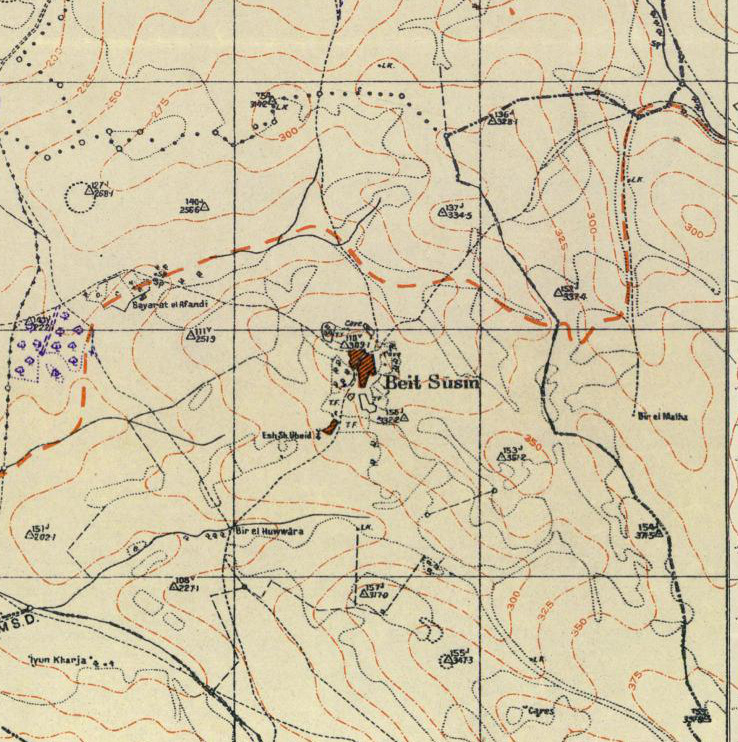
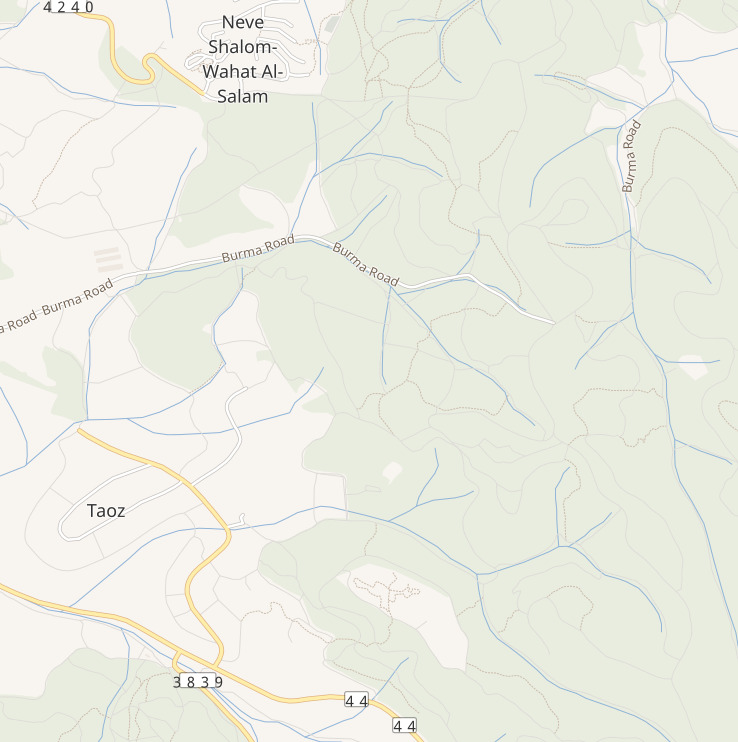
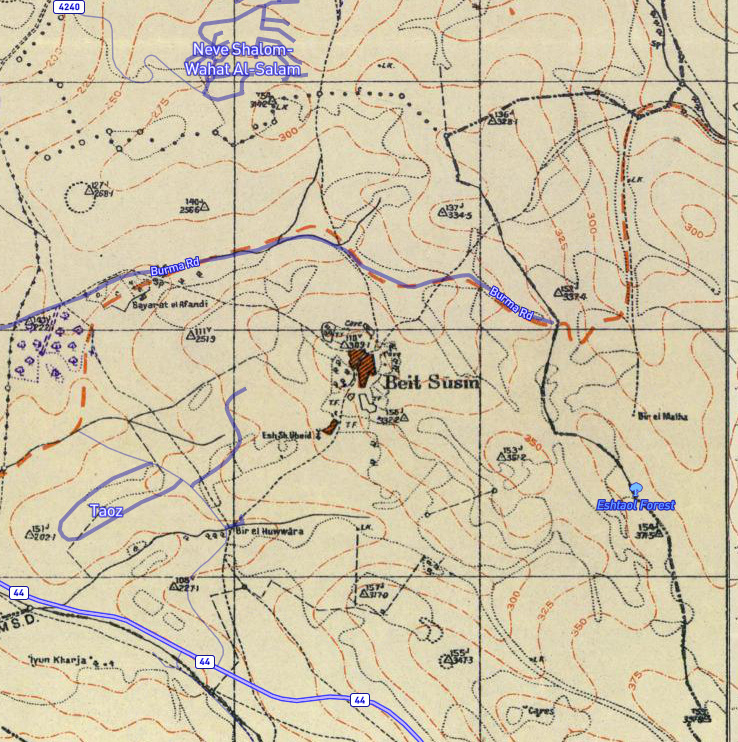
- 1870s map 1940s map modern map 1940s with modern overlay map A series of historical maps of the area around Bayt Susin (click the buttons)

- Location within Mandatory Palestine
- Coordinates: 31°48′22″N 34°59′1″E
- Palestine grid: 148/134
- Geopolitical entity: Mandatory Palestine
- Subdistrict: Ramle
- Date of depopulation: 20 April 1948

Population (1945)
  - Total: 210
- Cause(s) of depopulation: Military assault by Yishuv forces
- Current Localities: Ta'oz (est. 1950)

Bayt Susin (Arabic: بَيْت سُوسِين) was a Palestinian Arab village in the Ramle Subdistrict of Mandatory Palestine, located 17 kilometers (11 mi) southeast of Ramla. In 1945, it had 210 inhabitants. The village was depopulated during the 1948 war by the Israeli 7th Brigade.

== Geography ==
Situated on a hilltop on the southern slopes of a mountainous area, Bayt Susin overlooked a wide area to its south and west. Below the village, two wadis, streaming from the slopes, met. The village stood near a network of roads that led to many urban centers and was linked by a secondary road to the Jaffa-Jerusalem Highway.

== History ==
Surrounding Bayt Susin were the ruins of a wall and cemeteries, cut stones, the foundations of houses, cisterns, and a basin. The Crusaders referred to the village as "Bezezin".

=== Ottoman era ===
While under the rule of the Ottoman Empire, in 1596, Bayt Susin was under the administration of the nahiya ("subdistrict") of Ramla, part of the Sanjak of Gaza, with a population of 50 households and 6 bachelors, all Muslims. They paid taxes on wheat, olives, and barley, as well as beehives and goats.

In 1838, Beit Susin was noted as Muslim village, in the Er-Ramleh district.

The American Biblical scholar Edward Robinson passed by Bayt Susin in 1852 and described it as a small and ancient village. An Ottoman village list from about 1870 showed that Beit Susin had a population of 21, with a total of 11 houses, though the population count included men, only.

In 1883, the PEF's Survey of Western Palestine (SWP) found here "foundations and ruined walls. A good perennial well, called Bir el Haurah, on the south and springs in the valley."

=== British Mandate era ===
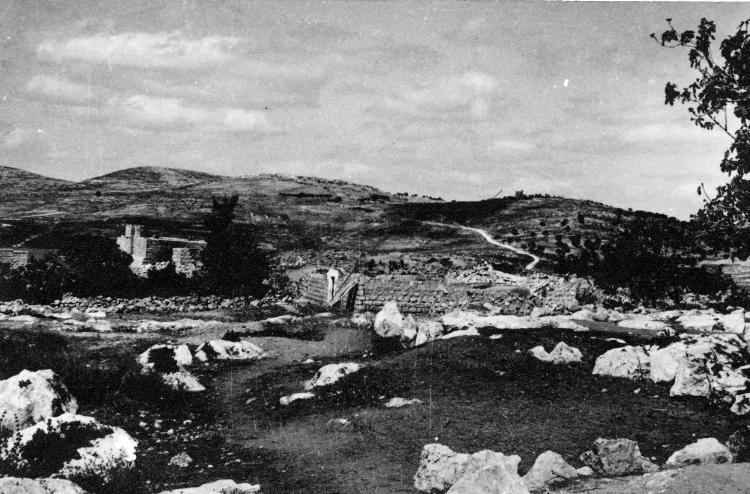
View of Bayt Susin from Bayt Jiz, 1948

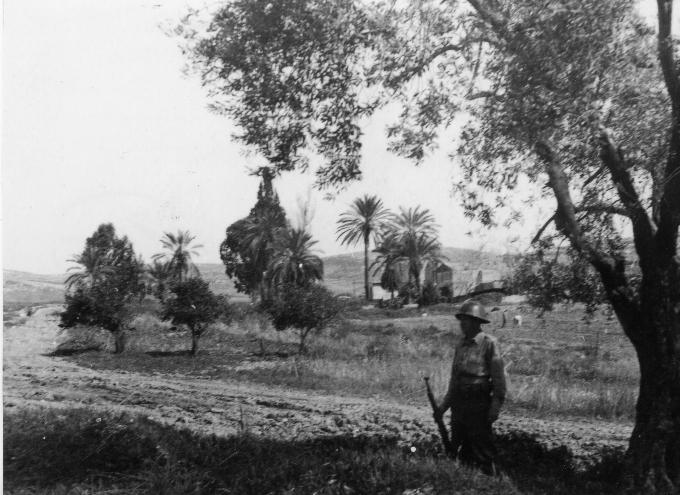
Orchard in Bayt Susin after occupation, 1948

In a census conducted in 1922 by the British Mandate authorities, Bait Susin had a population of 47 inhabitants; all Muslims, increasing in the 1931 census to 70, still all Muslims, in a total of 14 houses.

Bayt Susin was classified as a hamlet by the Palestine Index Gazetteer. In the British Mandate period, it was divided into two sections. The larger section had a rectangular, north–south plan and the smaller laid 250 meters (820 ft) to the southwest. Its houses were constructed of masonry and a mosque was located close to the village's smaller section. The residents used the spring to obtain water for domestic purposes. The primary economic sectors were agriculture (grain being the chief cash crop) and animal husbandry.

In the 1945 statistics, the population of Bayt Susin was 210, all Muslims, with a total land area of 6,481 dunams of which 5,453 were Arab-owned. The remainder was classified as public property. Bayt Susin grew grains on 5,108 dunams and 94 dunams were either irrigated or used for orchards, while 8 dunams were built-up (urban) areas.

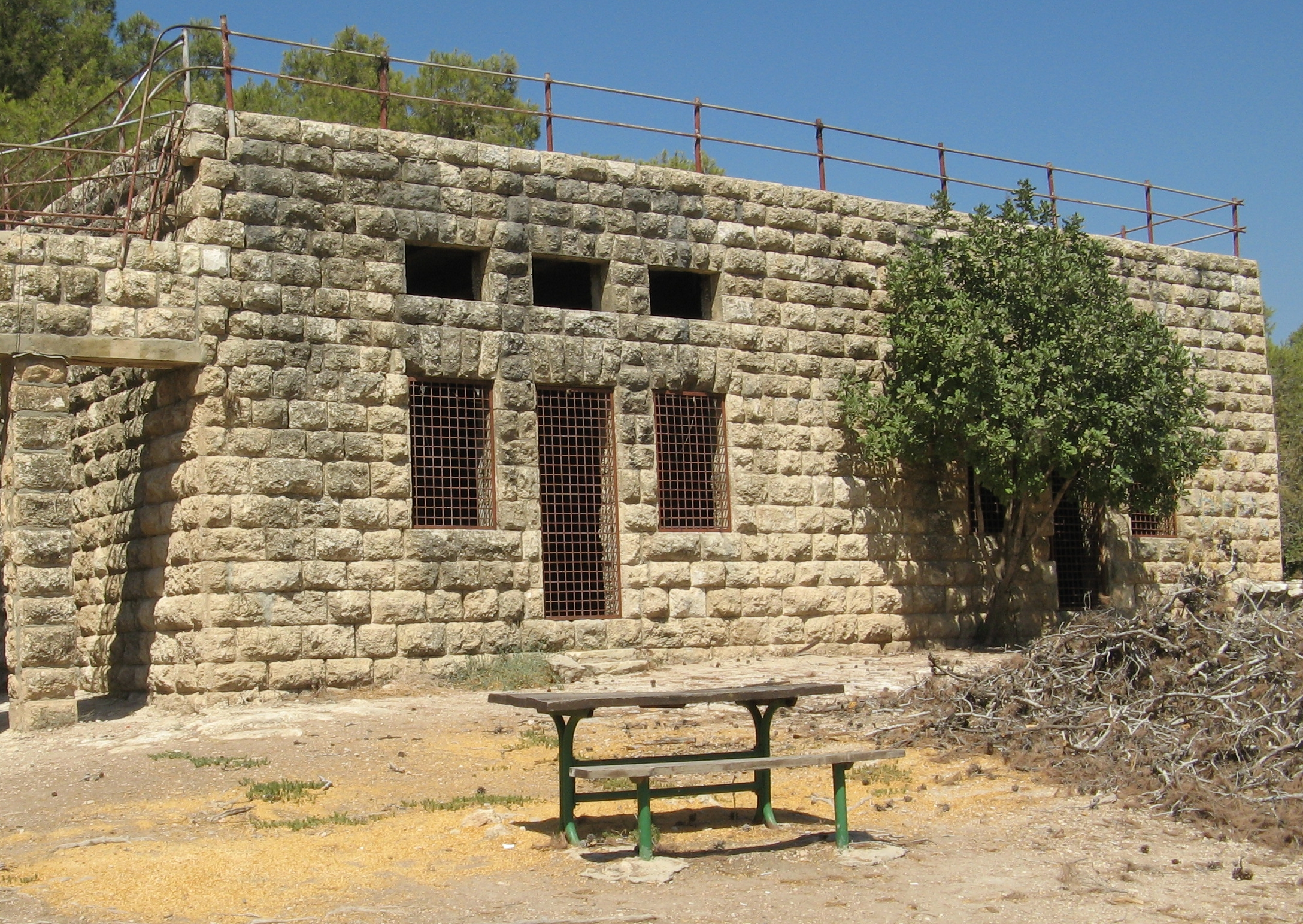
School, built in 1947, which Bayt Susin shared with the villagers of Bayt Jiz

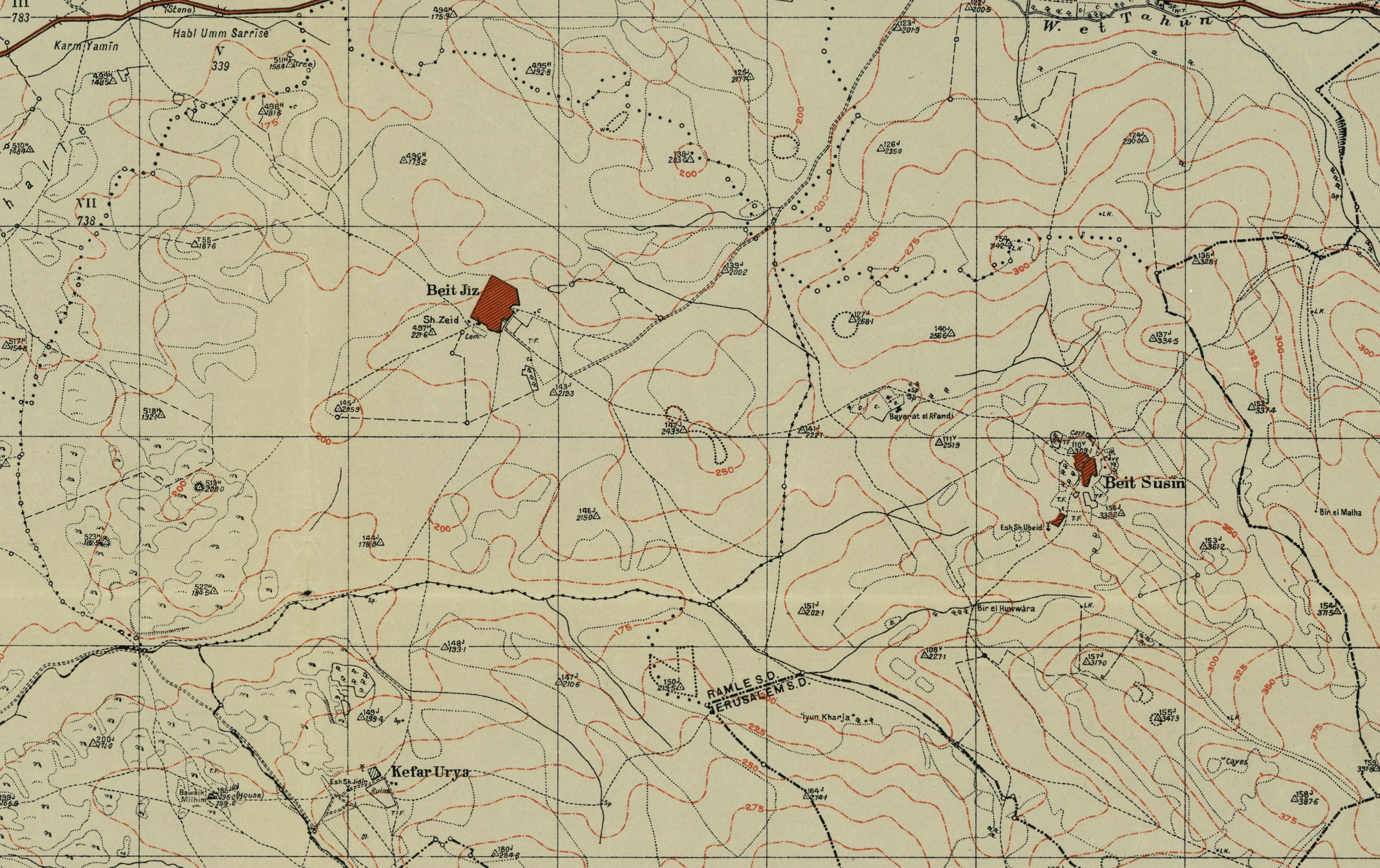
Bayt Susin 1942 1:20,000

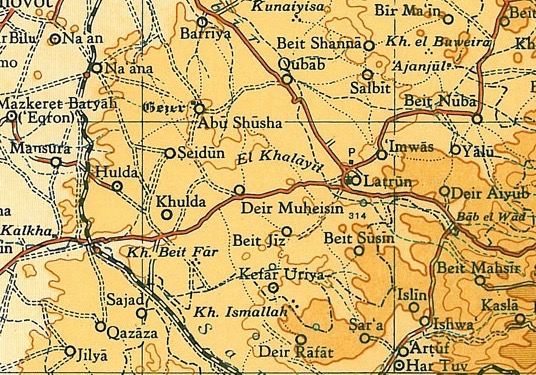
Bayt Susin 1945 1:250,000

=== 1948 war and aftermath ===
According to Israeli New Historian, Benny Morris, Bayt Susin was captured and depopulated on 20 April 1948, at the beginning of Israel's offensive, Operation Nachshon. However, Palestinian historian Aref al-Aref wrote an attempt at capturing the village occurred on 22 May, but failed due to both strong resistance from the local militia and false knowledge that it had been evacuated of its inhabitants. According to Israeli officers, on May 23 Bayt (Beit) Susin was occupied by Arab Legion and irregulars, which was unknown to Jewish commanders. The village was a source of flanking fire at the Jewish forces when they attacked Latrun on May 23.

During Operation Bin Nun Alef—which was aimed at taking the Latrun salient and ended in an Israeli failure— Arab counterattacks were launched from Bayt Susin. In preparation of Operation Bin Nun Bet, Israeli soldiers from 72nd Battalion of the Sheva Brigade cleared the village on 28 May. It is not known if Bayt Susin was destroyed after its capture, but most Arab villages occupied in the Latrun salient were leveled. The Burma Road that the Israelis started to build a few days later to supply Jerusalem crossed the village.

On 20 August 1948, Bayt Susin was one (of 32) depopulated Palestinian villages which were proposed by David Ben-Gurion for new Jewish settlements. The moshav of Ta'oz was established on Bayt Susin's lands, but southwest of the village site, in 1950. According to Palestinian historian Walid Khalidi, whose researchers visited the site in 1990, Bayt Susin "has been leveled by bulldozers; grass and thorns cover the remaining rubble... and the remains of walls from houses can be seen on the southern edge, where carob, pine, and cedar trees grow."

== See also ==
- Meir Tobianski

== Bibliography ==
- Barron, J. B., ed. (1923). Palestine: Report and General Abstracts of the Census of 1922. Government of Palestine.
- Conder, C.R.; Kitchener, H.H. (1883). The Survey of Western Palestine: Memoirs of the Topography, Orography, Hydrography, and Archaeology. Vol. 3. London: Committee of the Palestine Exploration Fund.
- Department of Statistics (1945). Village Statistics, April, 1945. Government of Palestine. Archived from the original on 2025-05-10.
- Hadawi, S. (1970). Village Statistics of 1945: A Classification of Land and Area ownership in Palestine. Palestine Liberation Organization Research Centre. Archived from the original on 2018-12-08.
- Hartmann, M. (1883). "Die Ortschaftenliste des Liwa Jerusalem in dem turkeschen Staatskalender dur Syrien auf das Jahr 1288 der Flucht (1871)". Zeitschrift des Deutschen Palästina-Vereins. 6: 102–149.
- Hütteroth, W.-D.; Abdulfattah, K. (1977). Historical Geography of Palestine, Transjordan and Southern Syria in the Late 16th Century. Erlanger Geographische Arbeiten, Sonderband 5. Erlangen, Germany: Vorstand der Fränkischen Geographischen Gesellschaft. ISBN 3-920405-41-2. Archived from the original on 2025-01-28.
- Khalidi, W. (1992). All That Remains:The Palestinian Villages Occupied and Depopulated by Israel in 1948. Washington D.C.: Institute for Palestine Studies. ISBN 0-88728-224-5. Archived from the original on 2024-10-08.
- Mills, E., ed. (1932). Census of Palestine 1931. Population of Villages, Towns and Administrative Areas. Jerusalem: Government of Palestine.
- Morris, B. (2004). The Birth of the Palestinian Refugee Problem Revisited. Cambridge University Press. ISBN 978-0-521-00967-6. Archived from the original on 2024-10-14.
- Morris, B. (2008). 1948 : A History of the First Arab-Israeli War. New Haven [Conn.]: Yale University Press. ISBN 978-0300126969.
- Palmer, E.H. (1881). The Survey of Western Palestine: Arabic and English Name Lists Collected During the Survey by Lieutenants Conder and Kitchener, R. E. Transliterated and Explained by E.H. Palmer. Committee of the Palestine Exploration Fund.
- Robinson, E.; Smith, E. (1856). Later Biblical Researches in Palestine and adjacent regions: A Journal of Travels in the year 1852. London: John Murray.
- Röhricht, R. (1887). "Studien zur mittelalterlichen Geographie und Topographie Syriens". Zeitschrift des Deutschen Palästina-Vereins. 10: 195–344.
- Socin, A. (1879). "Alphabetisches Verzeichniss von Ortschaften des Paschalik Jerusalem". Zeitschrift des Deutschen Palästina-Vereins. 2: 135–163.
