= Israel Beer =

Austrian-Israeli spy (1912–1966)

- ישראל בר
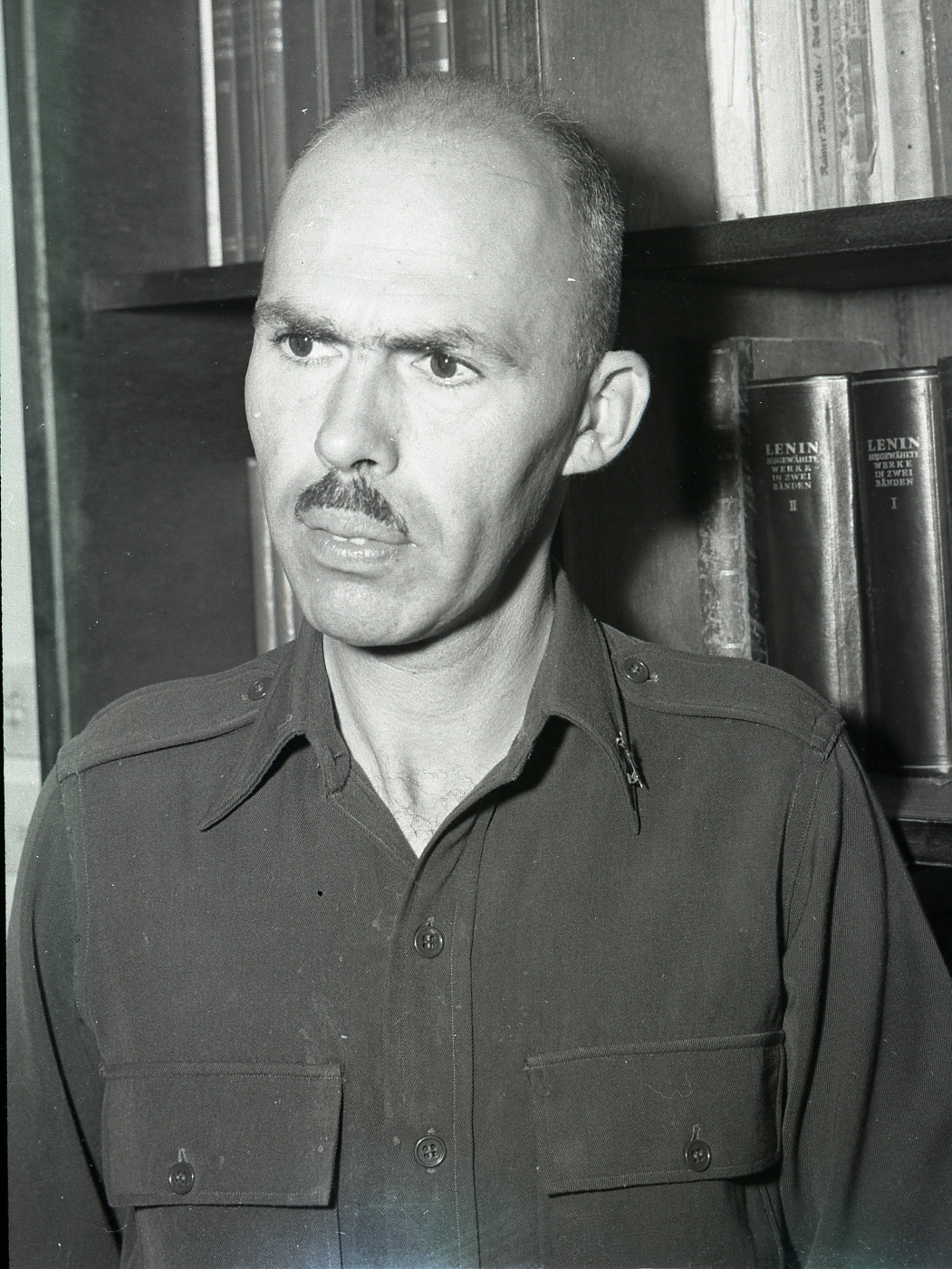
- Born: 9 October 1912; Vienna, Austria-Hungary
- Died: 1 May 1966 (aged 53); Tel Aviv, Israel

Israel Beer (also spelled Yisrael Bar, also known as Captain José Gregorio; 9 October 1912 – 1 May 1966) was an Austrian-born Israeli citizen convicted of espionage. On March 31, 1961, Beer, a senior employee in the Israeli Ministry of Defense, was arrested under suspicion of espionage for the Soviet Union. A former lieutenant colonel in the IDF, Beer was a well-known military commentator and an acknowledged expert on military history, and he was employed in a civilian position within the Israeli Ministry of Defense to write a book on the history of the 1947–1949 Palestine war. His true identity, his personal history before emigrating to Palestine, and the circumstances of his recruitment to the KGB (which he never admitted), have all remained unknown to this day.

== Unconfirmed early history ==
Beer claimed to have been born in Austria in the name Georg Beer to an assimilated Jewish family, that he had been active in the Austrian Social Democratic Party and that he had taken part in the armed conflict between the party's military organisation, the Schutzbund, and the Austrian Army. Beer took pride in having later completed officer training in the Austrian military academy and having served as an officer in the army for a certain period of time. He claimed to have completed his service as a colonel serving as a brigade commander and to have fought in the Spanish Civil War as a volunteer for the International Brigades in the Thälmann Battalion. He also claimed to hold a doctorate in literature from the University of Vienna.

During interrogation, Beer repeated the story but Isser Harel, Director of Mossad and also in charge of Shin Bet, calmly told him, "You are a liar."

'We can find no trace of your parents in Austria. If they were typical Jewish parents, as you make them out to be, then why aren't you circumcised?'

'We have checked all the records in Austria. You never fought on the barricades. You never received a doctorate, as you claim you did, nor did you ever attend the university. You did not go to the military academy because Jews were not allowed to at the time. They have checked their lists for us and your name is not there. The Schutzbund has no record of your membership either.'

'We have gone through the records of the international brigade and your name is not there. You never fought in Spain....'

'Now tell me: who are you? We want the truth.'

He neither revealed his true identity nor admitted that he worked for the KGB.

== Confirmed history ==
Beer had obtained first-hand knowledge of both theoretical and historical military areas, which made him an expert in these issues and an acknowledged expert on military affairs, despite his lack of real field experience. He was proficient in the details of the battles, names of places, commanders, military units, which he used to gain credibility and additional military experience.

He immigrated to Palestine in October 1938 and was accepted to the Hebrew University of Jerusalem as a research student. At the same time, he joined the Haganah organisation.

Beer's publication of articles on military subjects led to his acceptance in 1940 as a permanent member of the Haganah. There, he took part in training and in planning until the outbreak of the 1947–1949 Palestine war, but was found to have lacked basic soldiery skills - which led Moshe Dayan to question Beer's claims that he fought in Spain, let alone as a commander and colonel.

With the establishment of the IDF, he was appointed as one of the two assistants to the head of the Operations Division and the Deputy Chief of the General Staff as well as serving as head of the Planning Division for the Operations Division, at the rank of lieutenant colonel.

He requested discharge from the IDF in 1949 because of his failure to be promoted to a new position in the Operations Division, in direct subordination to the Chief of the General Staff of the Israel Defense Forces. He bitterly claimed that he was not promoted because his credibility was in question because of his connection with Mapam, a democratic socialist party that rivaled the ruling, Labor Zionist Mapai. He was formally discharged after a leave of absence in July 1950.

Beer was politically active in Mapam during his service in the IDF. After his resignation from the IDF he began work in Mapam, as head of its security department. In that position, he obtained military intelligence information about the IDF to keep party officials, who were in the opposition, informed, and he was closely connected with the party's information department which was gathering political non-military intelligence.

During his Mapam activity, Beer was closely associated with Moshe Sneh, the leader of the Left Faction, a group which identified itself with the Soviet Union and communism. The Prague Trials and the Moscow Doctors' Plot in 1952 and 1953 caused internal dissent within the Mapam and a split: the Left Faction resigned from Mapam and later formed Maki. In January 1953, he chose unexpectedly not to join Sneh and temporarily retired from political activity. In 1954, to the surprise of many, he joined Mapai, the majority party led by David Ben-Gurion.

In the early 1950s, he lectured on military history in various courses in the IDF. In mid-1955, he signed a civilian contract with the Israeli Ministry of Defense with the intent of writing about the events of the 1947–1949 Palestine war. He was involved in the project right up to his arrest. In 1959, Beer was appointed head of the Department of Military History in the University of Tel Aviv.

He was considered among the ministry's senior administrative officials, as the civilian contract with the Israeli Ministry of Defense afforded him the rank of colonel. That position allowed him intermittently to receive various updates, including classified material.

The dramatic change in his avowed political views sparked varying reactions. Some considered him to be an opportunist hoping to return to the IDF; others viewed his efforts to approach Ben-Gurion, the Defense Minister of Israel, with suspicion and considered them an alarming sign of attempted left-wing influence.

Beer used his new status in the Ministry of Defense to his advantage, to create the impression that he had a very close relationship with Ben-Gurion and that he was one of his confidantes and advisers. Despite his civilian status, he could often be seen wearing the uniform of a lieutenant colonel. Furthermore, he had the habit of spending lunch breaks in the General Staff base, where he would meet senior officers and exchange updates and opinions.

He presented himself as a close confidante of the Minister of Defense and so gained the trust of many of his colleagues and associates at the General Staff Base, who even considered him to be a close link to the minister and one who could promote their personal and professional interests. Some even provided him classified documents, including intelligence assessments, for consideration.

From 1958, Beer began to develop close connections in Europe, including Germany, France, the United Kingdom and other Western countries. Furthermore, he embarked on several trips to those countries, which created the impression that he was on a government mission and so obtained the aid of military attachés and Ministry of Defense delegations. His meetings included the German Minister of Defence, Franz Josef Strauss, and the head of French intelligence.

Despite the explicit prohibition of the head of the Mossad, Isser Harel, which was conveyed to him by the director general of the Ministry of Defense, Beer, during a visit to Germany, in 1960 met with the Chief of Federal Intelligence Service of West Germany, General Reinhard Gehlen, who was a prime target for Soviet intelligence.

Harel considered it suspicious when he discovered that Israel Beer had gone ahead with the meeting he had specifically prohibited. Harel had always suspected Beer for his close connection to Sneh; his activity in the Mapam Security Department, which seemed to have a subversive bent; and the suspicion that he could be a communist who had infiltrated Mapai to attain a central position and to become a Soviet Communist agent within the establishment.

The information on Beer at that point was not enough to cause his removal from his position in the Ministry of Defense legally. Consequently, Harel had three long conversations with Beer in 1955, 1956 and 1958. Beer was also closely monitored, with no results. Harel was not satisfied with the first conversation in 1955 in which Beer was questioned about his past. In September 1956, prior to the Kadesh operation, Harel had a second conversation with Beer, as a precautionary measure carried out in cases of "individuals with questionable loyalties". The conversation was also intended as a warning to such individuals that the Soviet could try to recruit them and were as a deterrence to the formation of such connections.

Following the arrest of Aharon Cohen in 1958, on the grounds of espionage for the Soviet Union and due to certain connections between Beer and Cohen around that time, Harel conducted another conversation with him.

No specific suspicions were raised in the three conversations, but Harel's suspicions were far from allayed.

Even after Beer's meeting with the head of the German intelligence service, he was monitored, but still, there was not enough material to support the suspicions.

== Arrest ==
In January 1961, Vladimir Sokolov, a member of the Soviet intelligence and a staff member at the Soviet embassy, was observed carrying out secretive activity in a certain area of north Tel Aviv. Shin Bet decided to increase the surveillance of this area to a daily level.

On March 29, 1961, at approximately 08:00, the surveillance detected an unidentified individual carrying out a secret meeting with Sokolov. Surveillance of the individual's movements led to an apartment on the second floor of 67 Brandeis Street in north Tel Aviv, Beer's apartment.

The following evening, on March 30, 1961, at approximately 08:00, Beer was observed walking in the area of the previous meeting, carrying a heavy briefcase. He met with Sokolov and was later seen walking without the briefcase. At 22:40, he was observed walking to his apartment holding the briefcase.

In the time between these events two Soviet cars, one of which belonged to Sokolov, were observed exiting the Soviet embassy separately and heading in the direction of Tel Aviv. A member of the Soviet intelligence holding a briefcase emerged from one of them. Shin Bet's intelligence assessment was that the material in the briefcase had been photocopied and returned to Beer.

He was interrogated that night and his apartment was searched. Classified documents were discovered during the search. Beer was arrested on the morning of March 31, 1961.

Beer initially denied all accusations of contact with foreign diplomats but later, he admitted to having connections with Soviet intelligence as well as to his operator, Sokolov. The interrogation revealed that Beer's recruitment by the Soviets began in 1956, when he met Sergei Lousiev, a representative of the Soviet news agency Tass, and a known member of the Soviet intelligence, in the apartment of an Israeli journalist.

About a month later, Beer was invited to Misha Eidelberg's apartment. Eidelberg was an old acquaintance from the Mapam and a central activist in the Communist organization The Movement for Friendship with the USSR. Shortly after arriving at Eidelberg's apartment, Lousiev arrived "unexpectedly" and began to discuss some "frustrations" in his press work: his lack of sources of information, the constant slandering of the Soviet Union in the Israeli press and the fact that no Israeli was willing to explain the Israeli point of view to the Soviets. By telling Beer that, Lousiev as much as invited him to become the Israeli spokesperson. Lousiev expressed his desire to continue meeting Beer and they decided to schedule another meeting over the phone. However, before Beer had the chance to call, he met Lousiev "coincidentally", and they scheduled another meeting, which was held in September 1956.

Beer informed the Minister of Defense's military secretary about the new acquaintance, and the secretary advised him to discuss the issue with the head of the ISA Amos Manor. Beer reported the issue to the head of the ISA during a meeting on a separate topic. Manor warned him that Lousiev was a member of the Soviet intelligence and that his intentions were far from innocent. Despite the warnings, Beer met Lousiev again.

In September 1956, when he was summoned for the meeting with Isser Harel, he mentioned his acquaintance with Lousiev and was warned again regarding the continuation of his relationship with the Soviet.

His further relationship with the Soviets was, claimed Beer, at three festive occasions held at the consulates of Bulgaria, the Soviet Union and Yugoslavia between September 1957 and January 1958. Beer met Lousiev again and was introduced to Vasili Avdyenko, a senior member of the Soviet intelligence, stationed as head of the KGB branch in the Soviet embassy.

According to Beer, the two had a serious conversation regarding political and strategic issues regarding the relations between Israel and the Soviet Union. Avdyenko later introduced Beer to Sokolov. He began meeting Sokolov in January 1958 and they gradually moved from semi-public meetings including intellectual exchange of ideas in pleasant surroundings, to conspiratorial meetings on military matters concerning Western countries and later, concerning Israel as well. Beer was subjected to a number of intelligence interrogations conducted in the Soviet intelligence facility, in the Russian Church in Abu-Kabir. During further stages of the intelligence relationship with Beer, Sokolov demonstrated increasing interest in security matters related to Israel. He demanded and was given documents, which he photocopied.

In early 1961, Sokolov's demands became more aggressive and even threatening. He demanded information on Israel's nuclear potential and implied that Beer would never be able to sever his connections with the Soviets. According to Beer, he was shocked and began to reconsider the relationship, which had begun on a political background but had turned into "the work of an actual mole".

He even contemplated, he claimed, turning to Shin Bet, but he did not do so because of Harel's hostile approach towards him and the harsh words between them after his meeting with the German general.

In response to pressure from the Soviet operator, Beer provided him the plans of an American army base that had been built in Turkey by an Israeli company, Solel Boneh. Sokolov appeared for his next meeting, which he had set with Beer for April 10, 1961.

On April 16, 1961, Beer's arrest became public, and Sokolov then left the country. Beer claimed in his defense that he had acted out of the hope to turn the Soviet orientation in the Middle East in Israel's favour.

Beer was tried for espionage and sentenced to 10 years of imprisonment. He appealed against his sentence to the Supreme Court of Israel. The court rejected his appeal, and his sentence was lengthened to 15 years imprisonment. He died while he was still in prison in May 1966.
