= Etzioni Brigade =

Reserve infantry brigade of the Israel Defense Forces

6th "Etzioni" Brigade
- חֲטִיבַת עֶצְיוֹנִי
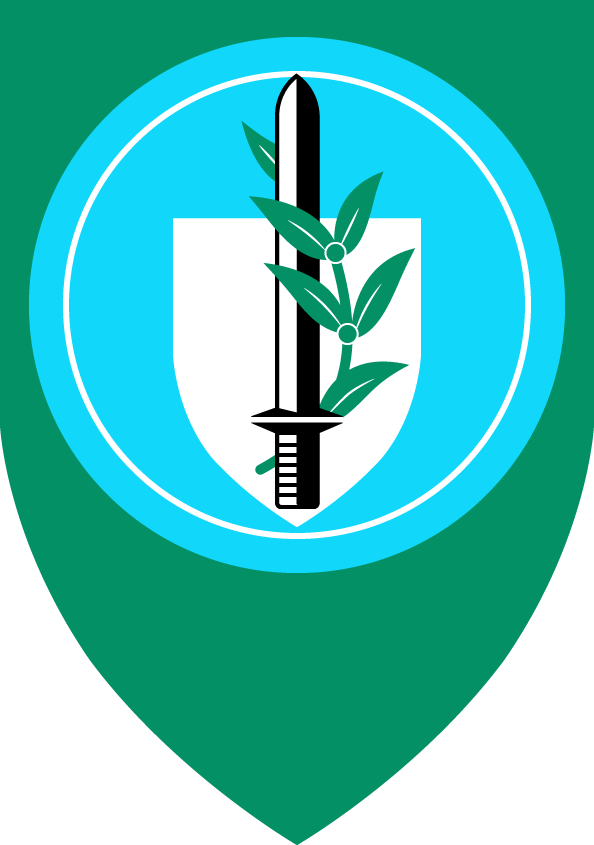
- Emblem of the Etzioni Brigade
- Active: 1948–1949; 1955–september 1958; 2010 –
- Country: Israel
- Branch: Israeli Ground Forces
- Type: Reserve
- Part of: 36th Division
- Engagements: 1948 Palestine war; Operation Yevusi; Operation Shfifon; Operation Pitchfork; Operation Kedem; Gaza war; 2024 Israeli invasion of Lebanon

Commanders
- Notable commanders: Yisrael Amir; David Shaltiel

The Etzioni Brigade (Hebrew: חֲטִיבַת עֶצְיוֹנִי, Hativat Etzyoni), also 6th Brigade and Jerusalem Brigade, is an infantry brigade of the Israel Defense Forces. It was founded in late 1947 as the Field Corps unit responsible for the defence of Jerusalem and its surroundings, where it operated during the 1948 Arab–Israeli War along with the Harel Brigade. Its first commander was Yisrael Amir, who was replaced by David Shaltiel.

The brigade participated in operations in the city of Jerusalem itself, including Yevusi, Kilshon, the battles of Ramat Rachel, Kedem and Yekev.

== Founding and organization ==
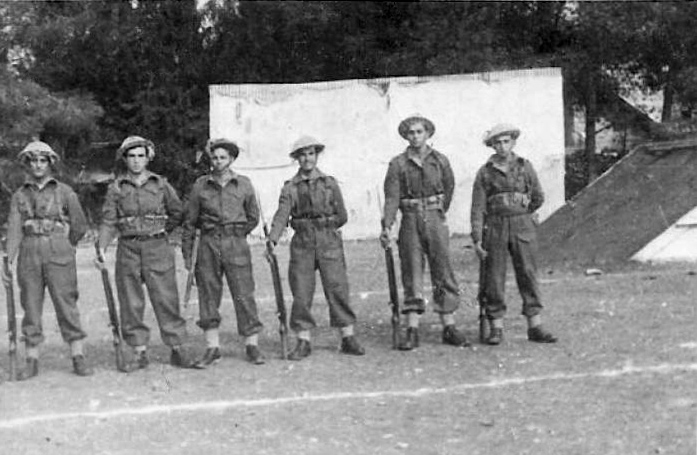
Etzioni soldiers in the Russian Compound in Jerusalem, 1948

The Etzioni Brigade was founded as part of the Haganah command's November 7, 1947 decision to create four infantry brigades based on the HISH—Levanoni, Alexandroni, Givati and Etzioni. In all, three battalions were envisioned and two initially deployed: the 61st "Moriah" Battalion, and the 63rd "Mikhmas" Battalion. The 62nd "Beit Horon" Battalion was added in May 1948, and the 63rd was disbanded during the same month. Guard Corps and Gadna units in the Jerusalem area, totalling five battalions, were also subordinated to the brigade. Altogether, on May 15, Moshe Zadok of the Manpower Directorate reported the strength of the brigade to be 3,166.

The Jerusalem region, and hence the brigade's theatre of operations, stretched from the Dead Sea in the east, Atarot in the north, Gush Etzion in the south and Hartuv in the west. According to Plan Dalet, Etzioni's job was to "Take key positions on the Jerusalem – Tel Aviv road and establishment in the city of Jerusalem". Yisrael Amir, who had held several staff positions before the war, was appointed to command the brigade on the recommendation Moshe Sneh.

=== Command disputes and reorganization ===
Before the Haganah reorganised its infantry forces in February 1948, the brigade was divided into two battalions; the first was responsible for northern Jerusalem, Motza, Atarot and Neve Ya'akov, and was commanded by Zalman Mart. The second was responsible for the Old City and Gush Etzion, under Shalom Dror. The brigade was, however, unprepared for the battles to come, and its commander Yisrael Amir did not cooperate with the rest of the units in the area.

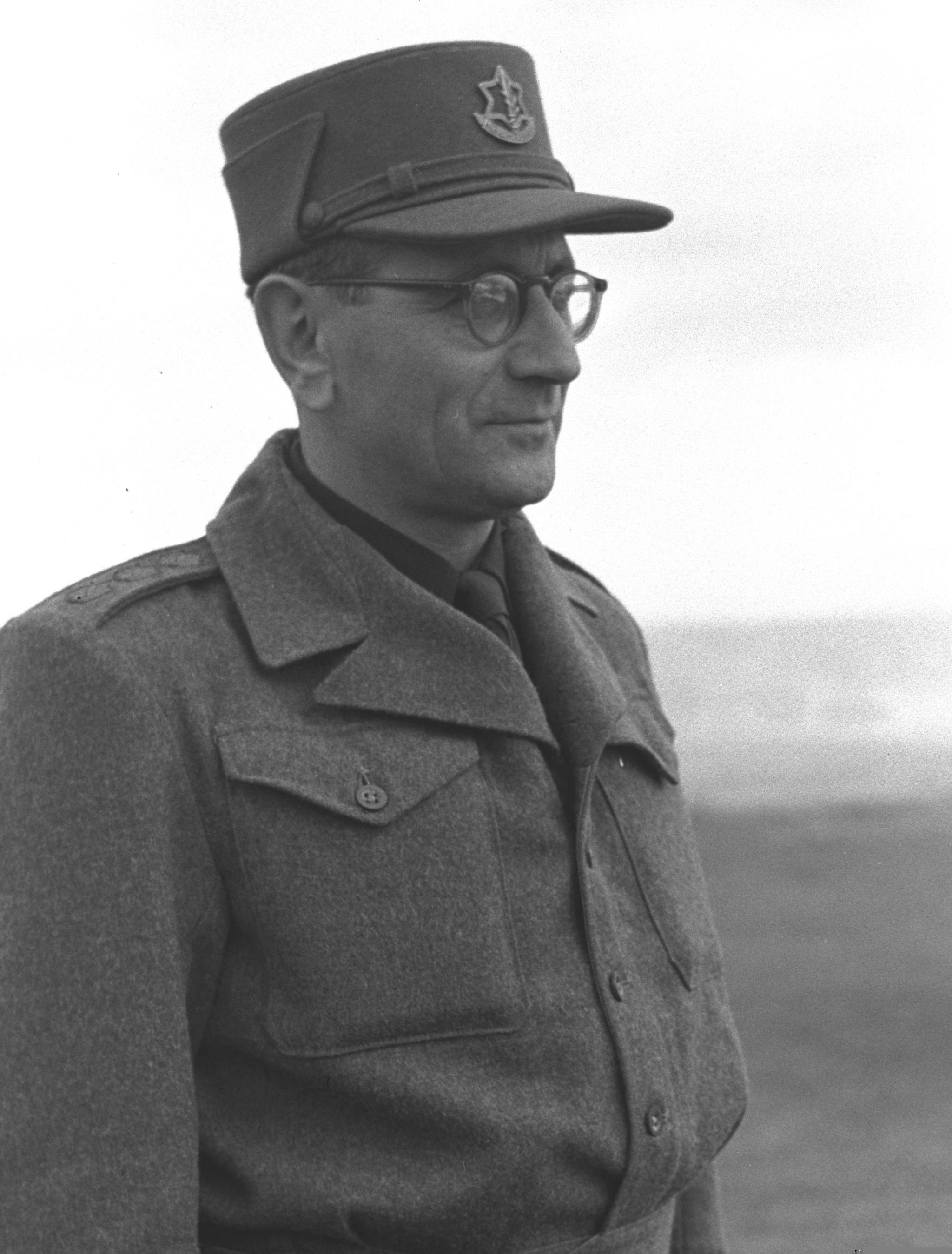
David Shaltiel

David Shaltiel, who replaced Amir as a brigade commander in the same month, reorganized the forces and divided Jerusalem into five regions, four of them going to the Guard Corps, with the Old City and southern neighbourhoods going to the operational battalions (61st and 63rd). The reorganization did not help, and in March 1948, Shaltiel commented that the unit had severe supply and discipline problems, and at that pace Jerusalem would not hold out even until May 15.

Shaltiel's method of command worsened the discipline issues until in June 1948 the 61st Battalion rebelled and was subordinated to the Harel Brigade until August 1948. In May 1948, Yisrael Galili created a staff unit in Etzioni that was based in Tel Aviv, responsible for the Jerusalem region's outlying and isolated settlements.

The command change did not help cooperation between the different units in the Jerusalem area. Shaltiel insisted that the regional command should be responsible for all units in its area, including the Harel units, which according to Shaltiel only took orders from the Palmach HQ in Tel Aviv. Shaltiel was at odds with the Haganah high command over his unilateral agreements with the Irgun and Lehi, which were not approved by the command.

The political and cultural leaders of Jerusalem did not accept the brigade's authority on security issues, especially under Shaltiel. Jerusalem's civilian population refused to provide Etzioni with necessary fuel and manpower, and Dov Yosef, the head of the Jerusalem council, send a personal complaint to David Ben-Gurion about Shaltiel's recruitment practices.

Moshe Dayan replaced David Shaltiel as the regional commander of Jerusalem on July 25, 1948, although he failed to affect significant territorial changes in the area. Dayan ended his tenure in February 1949.

== Operations ==
As the Etzioni Brigade had a smaller operational (Field Corps) force than the other brigades, it never left the Jerusalem theatre. In all, it suffered between 592 and 651 killed in action in the battles for Jerusalem and Gush Etzion, more than any other brigade's KIA in the entire war. Because of the lack of manpower and training among the Guard Corps units, during the first stages of the war Etzioni was mostly confined to guard duties, with no reserve units for initiating attacks.

The Etzioni Brigade participated in Operation Yevusi (April–May 1948), the first operation in Haganah history that was carried out by more than one brigade, the other one being Harel. The 61st Battalion captured the Katamon neighbourhood on May 2–3 and connected with the previously isolated Mekor Haim.

Upon British withdrawal from Jerusalem in May 1948, after Operation Shfifon in the Old City, Etzioni, assisted by Irgun and Lehi paramilitaries, initiated Operation Kilshon to capture the areas formerly held by the British. Sheikh Jarrah and the areas between Yemin Moshe and Rehavia were taken on May 14, followed by the German and Greek colonies, Baka, Camp Allenby, and most of "Bevingrad" on May 15. Abu Tor was captured on May 17–18, ending the operation. After Kilshon, Etzioni made further small gains by capturing the Notre Dame Monastery next to the New Gate on May 17–18. A simultaneous attack at the Tower of David failed.

Following the Jordanian Arab Legion's capture of Sheikh Jarrah and entrance to the Old City, all Israeli units in Jerusalem engaged it, including Etzioni, especially in northern Jerusalem between Sanhedriya and the Notre Dame. An attack by the Legion on Mount Scopus was repelled mostly by Etzioni troops stationed there.

The brigade was a major participant in the battles of Ramat Rachel. On May 22, the kibbutz was taken and looted by Egyptian Muslim Brotherhood forces after heavy shelling. At 17:00, a unit from the 61st Battalion retook the village and handed it over to its Guard Corps units. This failed, and on May 23, the Arabs again captured the village. Etzioni recaptured it on the same night, leaving 75 defenders, 50 Irgun and 25 Etzioni. The third joint Muslim Brotherhood – Arab Legion attack came on May 24 and was mainly fended off by Irgun units. Etzioni and Harel reinforcements drove the Arab forces out and captured the Mar Elias Monastery to the southwest.

During the Battles of the Ten Days, Etzioni was set to significantly expand Jewish control of Jerusalem and its surroundings, including capturing the Old City. In northern Jerusalem, the initiative was held by the Arab Legion, which attacked Mandelbaum and Musrara and drew IDF units to the area. Despite this, Etzioni and regional Gadna units managed to take the Zion Gate, al-Maliha and Ein Karim on July 10–16.

Etzioni's 62nd Battalion participated in Operation Kedem on July 16–17, to take over the Old City in a frontal assault, due to a lack of time imposed by the impending ceasefire, but failed to breach its walls. Despite some successes, the operation came to a halt with the announcement of the ceasefire.

After the second truce of the war, Etzioni participated in Operation Yekev, meant to capture the mountains of Beit Jala, but failed in its mission and retreated. They took part in Operation Ha-Har, which cleared villages west of Jerusalem.

== After the 1948 Arab–Israeli War ==
The 6th Etzioni Brigade was disbanded following the war, in light of the IDF's overall reorganization only left three standing brigades in the summer of 1949. It was re-created as a Central Command reserve brigade in 1955. In September 1958 it was transferred to the southern command and re-designated as the 14th Brigade.

In 2010, the reserve 408th Infantry Brigade was renamed to Etzioni Brigade and given the number 6.

== Organization ==
- 6th Infantry Brigade "Etzioni"
  - 8103rd Infantry Battalion "Moriah"
  - 9219th Infantry Battalion "Beit Horon"
  - 9220th Infantry Battalion "Michmash"
  - 6408th Reconnaissance Battalion "Yonathan"
  - 8173rd Combat Engineer Battalion (Reserve)
  - 5166th Logistics Battalion "Etzioni"
  - Signals Company "Etzioni"
