= 16th Infantry Brigade (Israel) =

16th Infantry Brigade "Jerusalem"
- חטיבת ירושלים
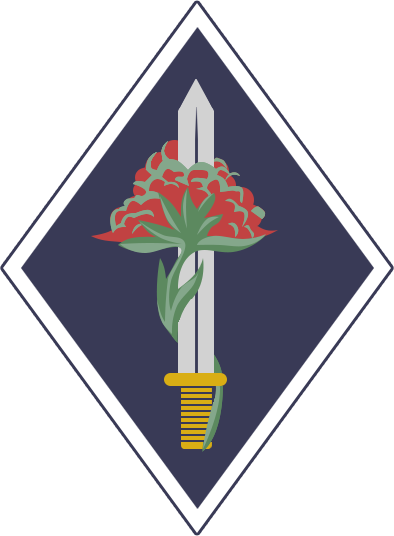
- Emblem of the Jerusalem Brigade
- Active: 1949 – Present
- Country: Israel
- Allegiance: Israel Defense Forces
- Branch: Israeli Ground Forces
- Type: Reserve
- Size: Brigade
- Part of: 252nd Division
- Nickname: Jerusalem Brigade
- Engagements: 1947–1949 Palestine war: Operation Yevusi; Operation Shfifon; Operation Kilshon; Operation Kedem; Gaza war

The 16th Infantry Brigade "Jerusalem" (also known as Jerusalem Brigade) is a reserve infantry brigade unit of the Israel Defense Force (IDF). The brigade is assigned to the 252nd Division "Sinai".

== Brigade organization ==
- 16th Infantry Brigade "Jerusalem" (Reserve)
  - 7007th Infantry Battalion
  - 8119th Infantry Battalion
  - 9207th Infantry Battalion
  - (6310th) Reconnaissance Battalion
  - 5160th Logistic Battalion
  - Signal Company
