= Notre Dame of Jerusalem Center =

Pontifical institute in Jerusalem

Coordinates: 31°46′48″N 35°13′33″E

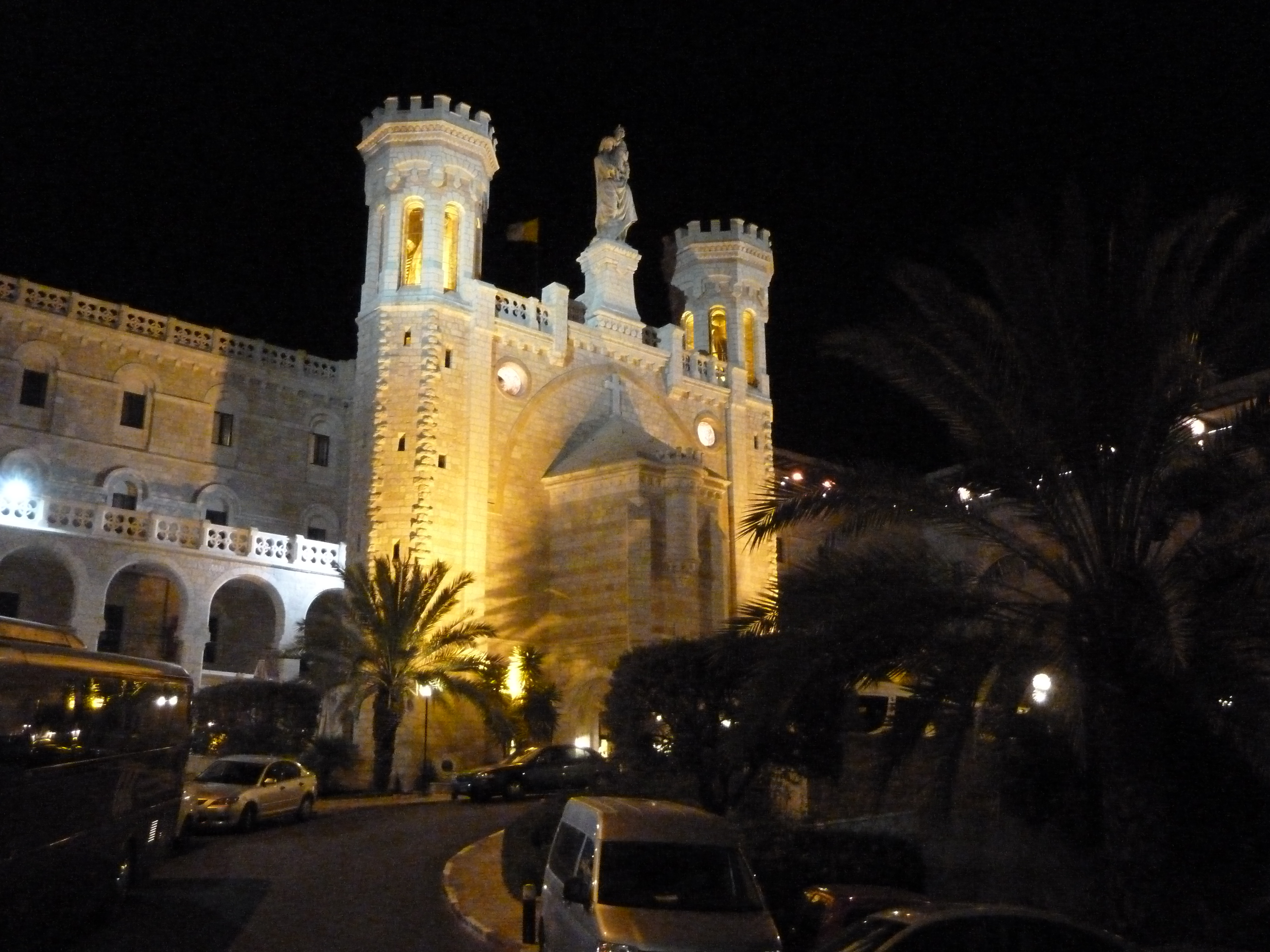
- Main entrance façade
- Interactive map of the Notre Dame of Jerusalem Center area
- Former names: Notre Dame of France

General information
- Type: guest house
- Location: Jerusalem, Israel, HaTzanhamin #3
- Groundbreaking: 1885
- Completed: 1904
- Owner: Holy See

Design and construction
- Architect: Pierre Paul Brisacier (1831-1923)

Website
- http://www.notredamecenter.org/

Notre Dame of Jerusalem Center is a pontifical institute founded in 1978 with religious, cultural, and educational purposes. Its main activities are: welcoming pilgrims, divine worship, cultural education and formation of the local population, and ecumenism and inter-religious dialogue.

== History ==
=== Conception ===
With the blessing of Pope Leo XIII as transmitted in a letter dated March 6, 1882 to Rev. François Picard, A.A., the Assumptionists of France (a religious congregation of the Roman Catholic Church) began to bring many pilgrims seeking to do penance in the Holy Land. One of the great obstacles they encountered was not having enough space to house the groups that sometimes surpassed 500 pilgrims at a time. Since they had to house them split into smallet groups that were geographically spread out, it prevented them from sharing community life and praying together at times when they were not visiting the holy sites. For this reason, in 1884, during the third large pilgrimage they led, they decided to construct a large guest house for this purpose. Notre-Dame de France

=== Construction ===
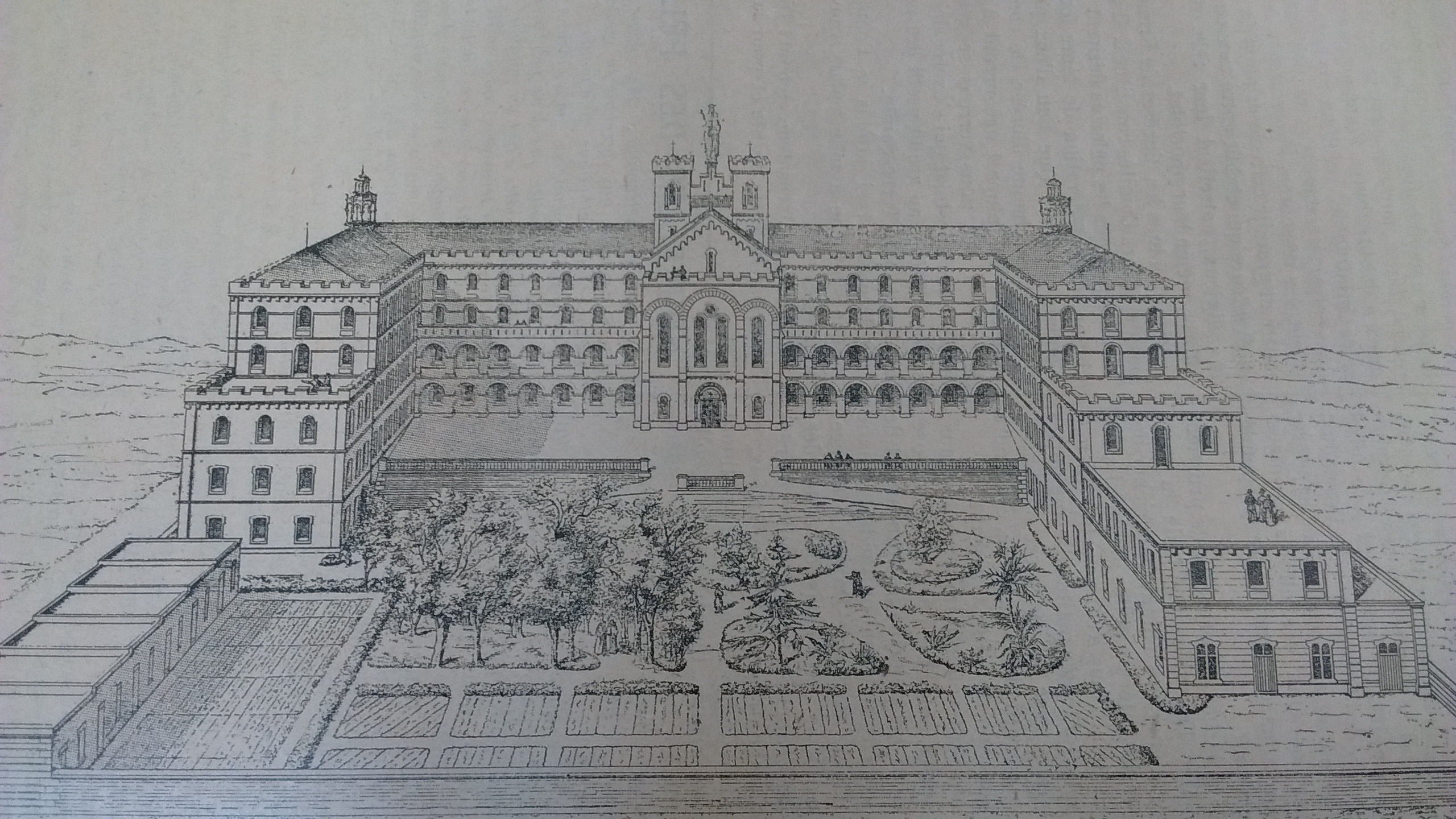
Construction project published in the journal "Échos de Notre Dame de France" n. 8 (January 1891)

==== North wing (1885-1888) ====
In 1885 on the 10th of June, shortly after purchasing the land, the first stone was laid and construction began on the north wing of the building. The blueprints were drawn up by Fr Pierre Paul Brisacier, the superior of the Assumptionists. Fr Joseph Germer-Durand, A.A. was put in charge of overseeing the construction. As the construction began, a large tent was set up on the property as a place for pilgrims to be received. On June 5, 1886 a meeting was held in this tent where Canon Poyet, of French origin, proposed for the first time the name "Notre Dame of France" having in mind the statue of Our Lady of France which was erected twenty-five years earlier in Le Puy-en-Velay. In 1888, the north wing was completed and the Notre Dame of France center began to officially receive pilgrims.

The creation of the New Gate in the wall of Jerusalem in 1889 increased the importance of the Notre Dame project even more, since the gate opened directly next to the building under construction and gave access to the Old City, especially to the Holy Sepulcher for the pilgrims who would stay there.

==== Chapel of Our Lady of Jerusalem (1893-1894) ====
On May 22, 1893, the Archbishop of Reims, Monseigneur Langéniuex, arrived to Jerusalem as a legate of the Holy See in order to preside over the 8th International Eucharistic Congress. During his visit, the Archbishop laid the first stone of the Chapel of Our Lady of Jerusalem, which was consecrated the following year on November 21, 1894 on the feast of the Presentation of the Blessed Virgin Mary.

==== South wing (1894-1896) ====
Construction on the south wing took place between 1894 and 1896. In this wing, a second chapel was built that was dedicated to the Sacred Heart of Jesus and was opened in 1899. It did not belong to the original plan, but was requested and financed by Mr. Bontoux in memory of his deceased son. This chapel disappeared after the reconstruction of the south wing in the 1970s, with a large part of the area where it stood now a museum of the Holy Shroud of Turin.

Behind the south wing, a new door for this area was built, on which a mosaic of the Assumption of the Blessed Virgin Mary was installed, which is currently behind the reception in the guest house lobby.

==== Statue of Our Lady of France (1904) ====
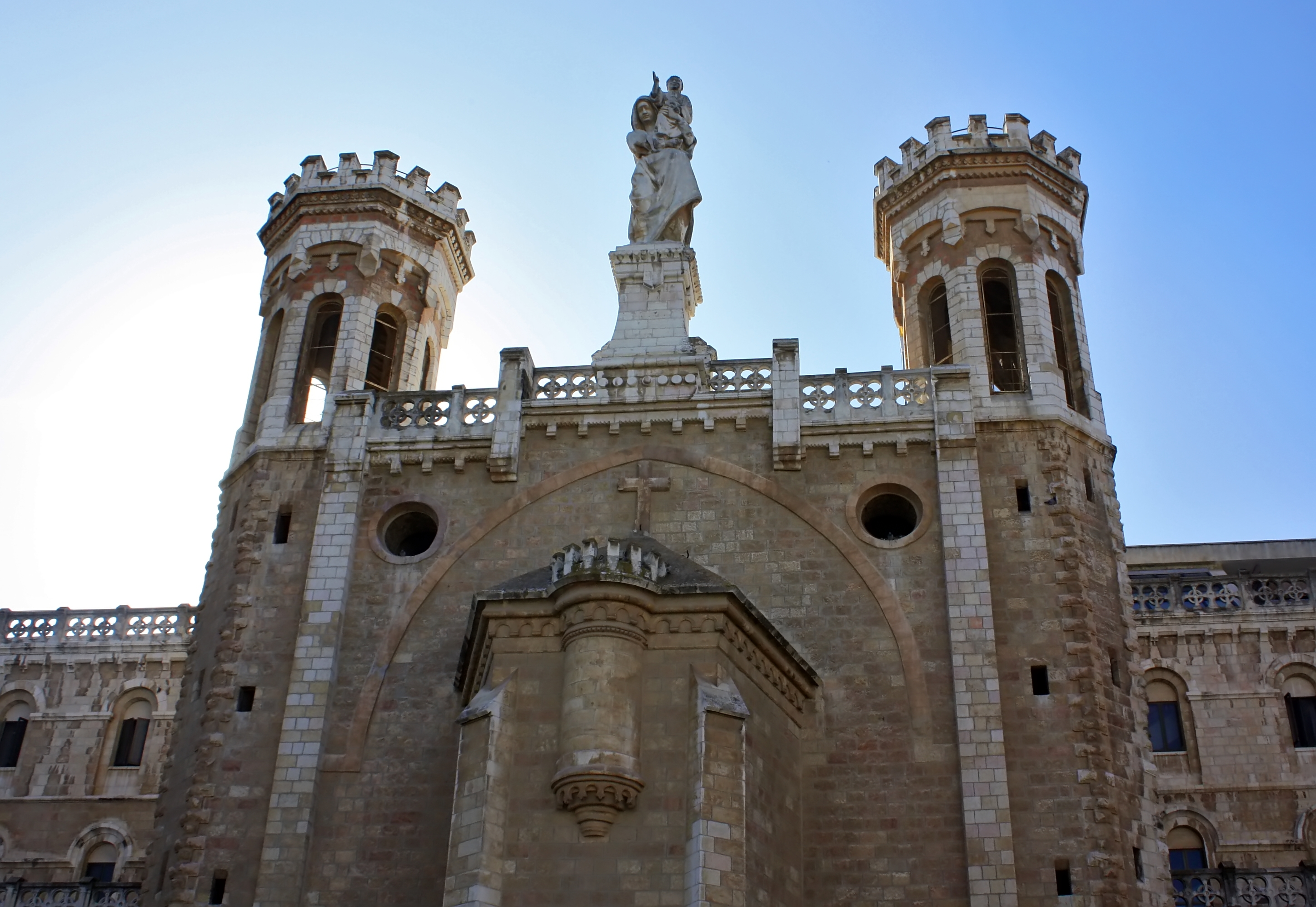
Statue of Our Lady of France

The statue of the Virgin with Child that presides over the façade of the building placed in 1904 was inspired by the statue of Our Lady of France. In its turn, it inspired sculptor Roger de Villiers in designing his 1937 monumental statue of Notre-Dame de Francel.

=== 1888-1925: guest house, magazine publication ===
The completed building included three hundred rooms, two chapels, reading rooms, dining rooms, a museum, a cement factory, an orchard, and a corral. As has been mentioned, in 1888 the first pilgrims began to stay in the building, although it was not yet finished.

In July 1888, the magazine entitled "Échos de Notre-Dame de France" (its name was changed to "Jerusalem" in 1900) began to be published as a way to keep pilgrims and benefactors of the center informed on its progress. Included in this magazine were pontifical documents related to the guest house, speeches and letter from those who visited the guest house, descriptions of pilgrims, and even archaeological discoveries that both Fr Joseph Germer-Durand and other members of the community had made.

The building also was used in part to house those in formation as future Assumptionist priests.

The guest house continued to function normally during the following years with a notable exception during the First World War. Notre Dame of France became the headquarters of the Turks. Although the chapels were respected, a witness confirms that the hostel had been "devastated and pillaged by the Turks". In 1922, after these difficult years, the French pilgrims returned, in 1924 the publication of the magazine "Jerusalem" resumed, and in 1925 the number and regularity of visitors returned to what it had been prior to 1914.

=== 1948 Arab-Israeli War ===
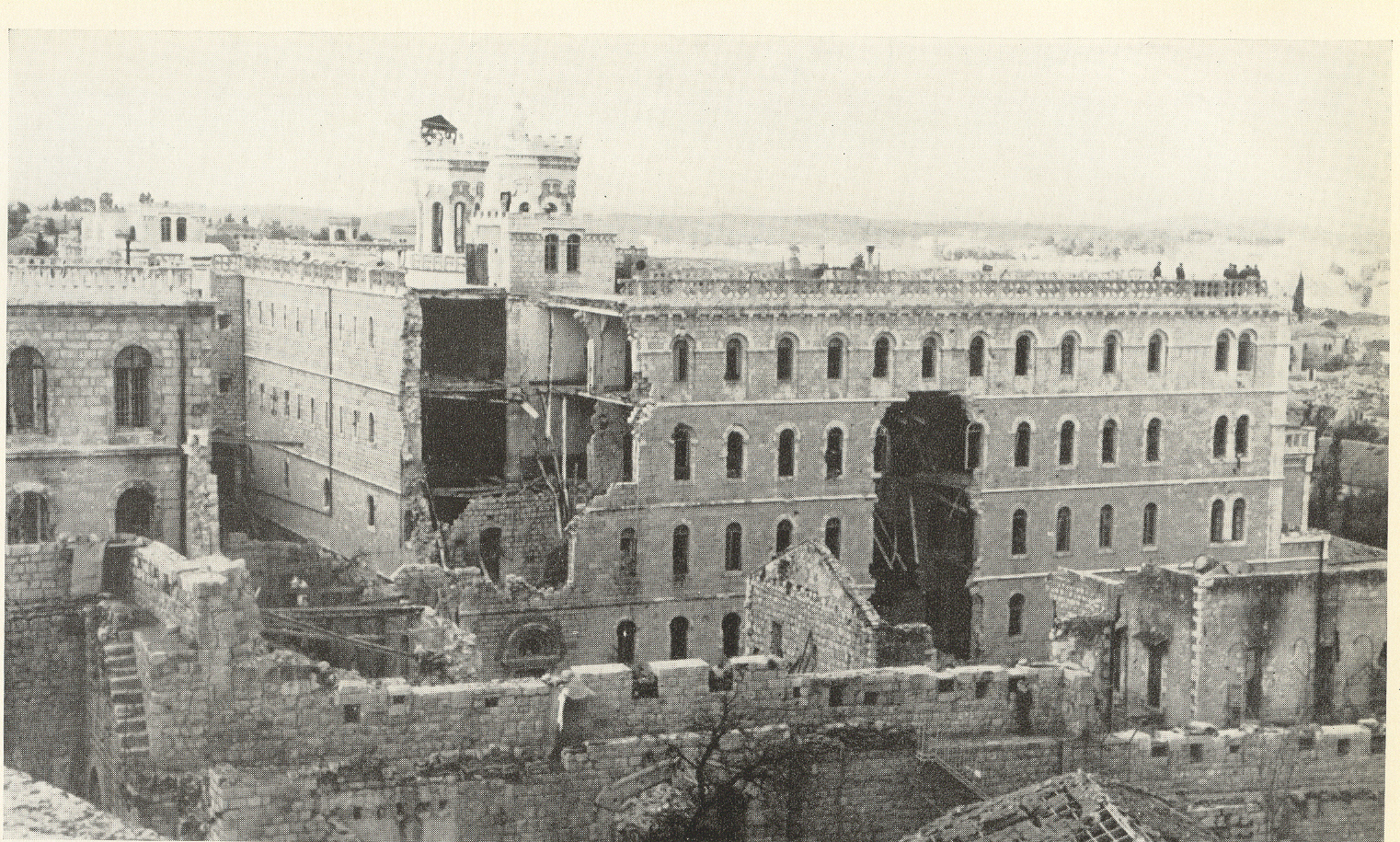
State of the south wing of the building after the war

On May 19, 1948 the last Mass was celebrated in the chapel of Notre Dame before the guest house became a battlefield during the Arab-Israeli War. Given its position at the highest point next to the ancient city walls, it was highly desired by those on both sides of the war.

After the British withdrawal on May 14, 1948, which ended the mandate received over Palestine, the Arab forces took control of the building. On May 18, during Operation Kilshon, a unit from the Moriah battalion captured Notre Dame of France. On May 20 the Arab Legion tried unsuccessfully to recapture the building, at which point its advance towards the west of the city was halted, although the building had already been badly damaged.

At the end of the war, in spite of the damaged state of the building, the Israeli army stayed put since they did not want to lose such a strategic position, and a small community of Assumptionists continued to live next to the main chapel. Many local refugees took refuge in the north wing and adjacent buildings, while the south wing was mostly destroyed and completely uninhabitable.

Two years later a journalist would describe the state of the main chapel:

"The shells had penetrated leaving large holes through which, for two winters, the rain had entered through. The altarpiece of the main altar was broken, the tabernacle was broken into, the canvas of the main apse was hanging miserably, the crucifixes all subjected to abuse, the stained glass windows were all broken, and the statue of the virgin was shattered".

Fr Gervais Quénard, A.A., superior of the religious community, immediately sought to restore the guest house. The Israeli commander of the Jerusalem district granted 5,000 pounds to repair the house. Two years later the chapel was repaired and reconsecrated and pilgrims began to arrive. Notre Dame remained on the Israeli side of Jerusalem, and the street that ran along Notre Dame and the Old City became the border with Jordan (the New Gate was blocked by a wall). For this reason, all interest in the guest house suddenly disappeared, since pilgrims staying there could not visit the main holy places in Jerusalem without having to cross the border. The most notable activity of Notre Dame, according to new articles of the time, was limited to some religious functions throughout the year.

=== Acquisition by the Holy See ===
In 1967, at the end of the Six-Day War, the border between the Israeli West Jerusalem and the Old City disappeared. The New Gate was reopened and Notre Dame of France once again became a desired location for pilgrims. The Assumptionist Fathers had an optimistic outlook:

"The movement of pilgrimages has resumed, and the Israeli authorities have expressed the desire to see the development of the services that the guest house can provide to those tourists of less means."

Things however did not go as expected. On the one hand, the religious congregation could not find the economic means to make the necessary repairs to the building, which was in very poor condition due to the war. On the other hand, they could not expel the Israeli tenants who, since the days of the 1948 Arab-Israeli War, had occupied a large portion of the property and made the buildings less profitable. They did not see how they could carry out a work that, due to the transformation of the city and society, seemed increasingly futile. For this reason, in September of 1970 it was announced that the building had been sold for $600,000 to the Israeli real estate company Hamenuta (a subsidiary of the Jewish National Fund) and that it would be converted into student dorms for those attending the Hebrew University of Jerusalem.

Upon receiving the news of sale, the Apostolic Delegation for Jerusalem and Palestine made a request to the Israeli court for an annulment of the sale since, in according with can. 534 of the Code of Canon Law of 1917, religious congregations cannot sell real estate worth more than $50,000 without the consent of the Hamenuta. In 1972, the situation was resolved amicably between the Holy See and the real estate company. The sale of the guest house was canceled and the Holy See reimbursed Hamenuta the amount of what had been paid for the purchase.

=== Notre Dame of Jerusalem Center ===
On many occasions, especially after his trip to the Holy Land in 1964, Pope Paul VI had expressed his desire to encourage pilgrimages and aid the local population. With the acquisition of the building, he saw the possibility of making this happen and converting it into a center to promote pilgrimages (by means of a guest house and travel agency offices), the social aid of the local population (through craft and hotel schools) and ecumenism. From that point forward, the guest house has been known in by the English name: Notre Dame of Jerusalem Center.

In 1973 the Holy See appointed Bishop Wasner as rector of the center and entrusted him with the repairs and implementation of the projects previously mentioned. In 1977 the German priest Fr Richard Mathes arrived and took over these projects. This process was concluded with the inauguration of the building and the creation of a pontifical institute for the fulfillment of the proposed initiatives.

"On December 27, 1978, in the presence of the seven Catholic rites of Jerusalem, in the presence of the Apostolic Delegate and the Chargé of the Holy See for Notre Dame, Cardinal Terrence J. Cooke, Archbishop of New York, officially promulgated, in the name of Pope John Paul II, the decree of erection of the Pontifical Institute of Notre Dame of Jerusalem Center, and reopened the restored chapel for worship."

A letter, written in the form of a motu proprio, was issued by Pope John Paul II, by which the Pontifical Institute of Notre Dame of Jerusalem Center was created. This document established a center for purposes of religious, cultural, and educational nature which would depend directly on the Holy See by means of a chargé who would, by his role, be considered a cultural assistant of the Apostolic Delegation. It also declared that Notre Dame of Jerusalem Center was to be considered an "ecumenical holy place". For this purpose it would be considered a territorial prelature whose spiritual jurisdiction would be exercised by the apostolic delegate functioning as "prelate", the chargé acting as the vicar general.

Next to the renovated building, a small convent was built to house a community of nuns who would collaborate with the mission of the center. Shortly after, in 1979, the Sisters of Our Lady of Zion would arrive to carry out this work: providing religious information related to Christianity, information on the other monotheistic religions in Jerusalem, information on cultural events in the city, etc.

== Management ==
The director of the Pontifical Institute has the title of chargé (in charge) given by the Holy See, and is, by his very position, the cultural assistant of the Apostolic Delegation for Jerusalem and Palestine.

In 1978, with the creation of the Pontifical Institute, Msgr. Richard Mathes was named the first chargé and held this position until 1998.

In 1999, the Italian priest Don Aldo Tolotto was named chargé.

In 2004, by means of a motu proprio published on November 26, Pope John Paul II entrusted the care and management of the Institute to the Congregation of the Legionaries of Christ. At that time, Fr Juan María Solana Rivero was appointed changé.

In August of 2020, Fr David Steffy, a priest of the Legionaries of Christ, was named as the chargé and continues presently in this role.

== Archaeological discoveries ==
Within the center are some of the archaeological discoveries that Fr Germer-Durand, founder and first director of Notre Dame, had originally placed in a museum inside of the building. When the building was sold and the museum was dismantled, the larger items of the museums were relocated to various parts of the building.

Three of the stone pipes of the so-called "upper aqueduct" (which carried water from Bethlehem to Jerusalem between the 1st century BC and 1st century AD) can be found inside the building. These were found in 1900 and 1901 by Fr Germer-Durand near Rachel's Tomb. They were carved in limestone by Roman legionaries, and each pipe contains an inscription indicating in which century it was made. The names of the centurions are inscribed in Latin (Marco, Severo, and Ticinio). One of the rings is to the left of the entrance of the building and bears the inscription "Ɔ SEVERI" (century of Severus). Another ring has been reused as a baptismal font and is located at the entrance to the chapel. This one bears the inscription "Ɔ QVARTI" (century of Cuarto). The third is in the cafeteria next to the door that leads to the street, and bears the inscription “Ɔ TITINII ” (century of Ticinio).

On the ground floor to the right of the reception desk near the elevators is preserved the fifth milestone marker from the road of Jerusalem to Neapolis (Nablus) dating from AD 162. The date in the inscription shows that this milestone was placed in the time of the emperors Marcus Aurelius and Lucius Verus. It also indicates that from Jerusalem (then called Aelia Capitolina) to the location of that marker there were five thousand steps ("milia pasuum V"). It was discovered by Fr Germer-Durand in its original place, to the north of Al-Ram. Below is the text of the inscription, written in Latin and Greek:

Imp(erator) Caes(ar) M(arcus) Aurelius Antoninus Aug(ustus) pontif(ex) maximus trib(uniciae) potest(atis) XVI [co(n)s(ul) III] et Imp(erator) Caes(ar) L(ucius) Aurelius Uerus trib(uniciae) potest(atis) II co(n)s(ul) II diui Antonini fili diui Hadriani nepotes diui Traiani Parthici abnepotes Col(onia) Ael(ia) Capit(olina) m(ilia) p(assuum) V [απο] Κολ(ωνιας) Αιλιας Καπιτωλ(ινας) μιλ(ια) Ε.

== Present times ==
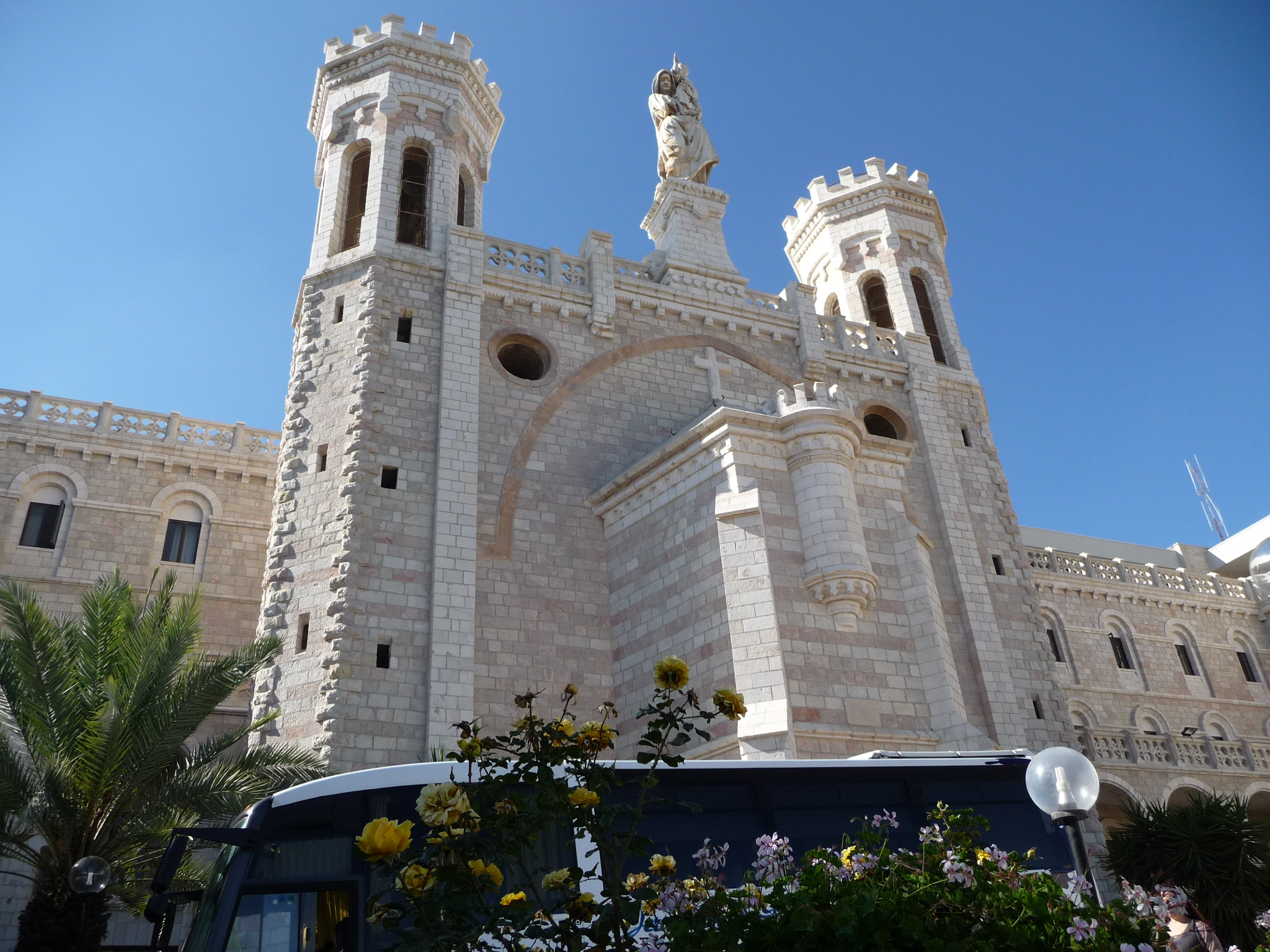
Notre Dame of Jerusalem Center

The Pontifical Institute Notre Dame of Jerusalem is entrusted to the Congregation of the Legionaries of Christ. A community of priests belonging to this congregation is dedicated to the attention of the sacraments and religious services performed in the chapel. In addition, the priests and a community of Regnum Christi Consecrated Women seek to aid in the spiritual care of the pilgrims and staff of the center.

The guest house currently has room for roughly 300 pilgrims (approximately 150 rooms), a chapel where the sacraments are celebrated daily, three restaurants, an auditorium, several conference rooms, a hotel school, and a museum on the Shroud of Turin. In addition, various Catholic institutions have their offices in the center.

== See also ==
- Chapel of Our Lady of Jerusalem
- Statue of Notre-Dame de France (Baillet-en-France), inspired by the one in Jerusalem
