= Etzioni =

Etzioni is a surname. Notable people with the surname include:

- Amitai Etzioni (born 1929), Israeli-American sociologist
- Danny Etzioni (born 1959), Israeli footballer
- Marvin Etzioni, American singer, mandolinist, bassist and record producer
- Oren Etzioni (born 1964), American computer scientist and entrepreneur
- Ruth Etzioni, biostatistician

Other:

- Etzioni Brigade, Israeli infantry brigade

== See also ==
- Etzioni Brigade
