= Generali Building =

- בניין ג'נרלי
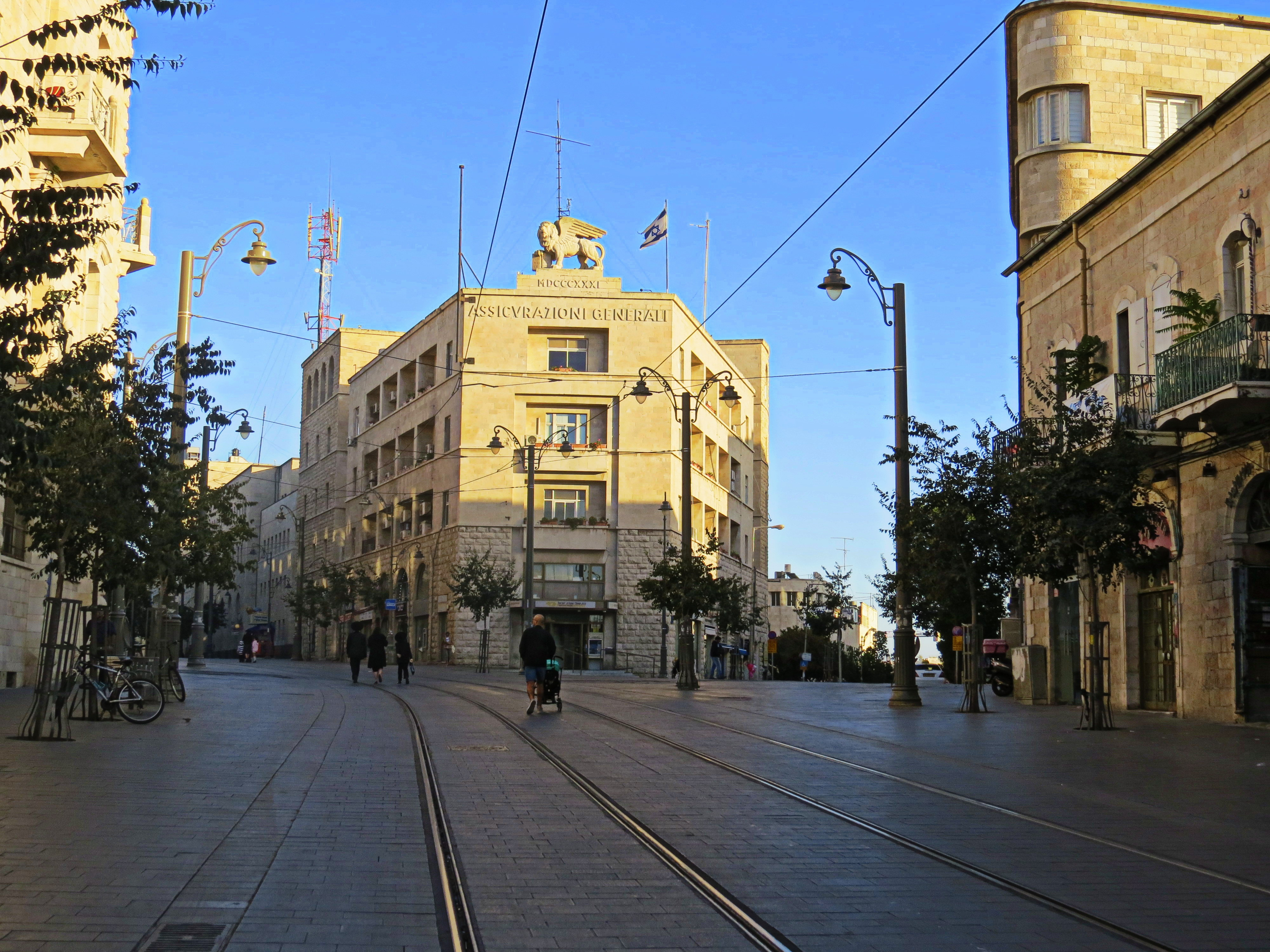
- Interactive map of the Generali Building area

General information
- Architectural style: Neoclassical, Modern
- Location: 25 Jaffa Road, Jerusalem, Israel
- Coordinates: 31°46′49.9″N 35°13′18.3″E
- Current tenants: Jerusalem District Administration; Israel Ministry of Interior
- Construction started: 1934
- Completed: 1935
- Owner: Assicurazioni Generali

Technical details
- Floor count: 5 to 6

Design and construction
- Architect: Marcello Piacentini
- Main contractor: De Farro Company

The Generali Building (Hebrew: בניין ג'נרלי, Binyan Generali) is a landmark office and commercial building on Jaffa Road in West Jerusalem. Designed by Marcello Piacentini, chief architect of the Italian Fascist regime, it served as the Jerusalem branch of the Assicurazioni Generali insurance company from 1935 to 1946. In 1946 the British Mandatory government nationalized the building and enclosed it and several other structures at the eastern end of Jaffa Road in a fortified security zone. With the end of the Mandatory government in 1948, the building was taken by the Irgun. Since the establishment of the state, the Generali Building has housed the offices of the Jerusalem District Administration and other government agencies, and street-level stores. The building's neoclassical and modern architecture, and large, rooftop sculpture of a Lion of Saint Mark have made it a prominent landmark in downtown Jerusalem.

== Location ==
The Generali Building is located in Bar Kochba Square at the intersection of Jaffa Road and Queen Shlomzion Street.

== Architecture ==
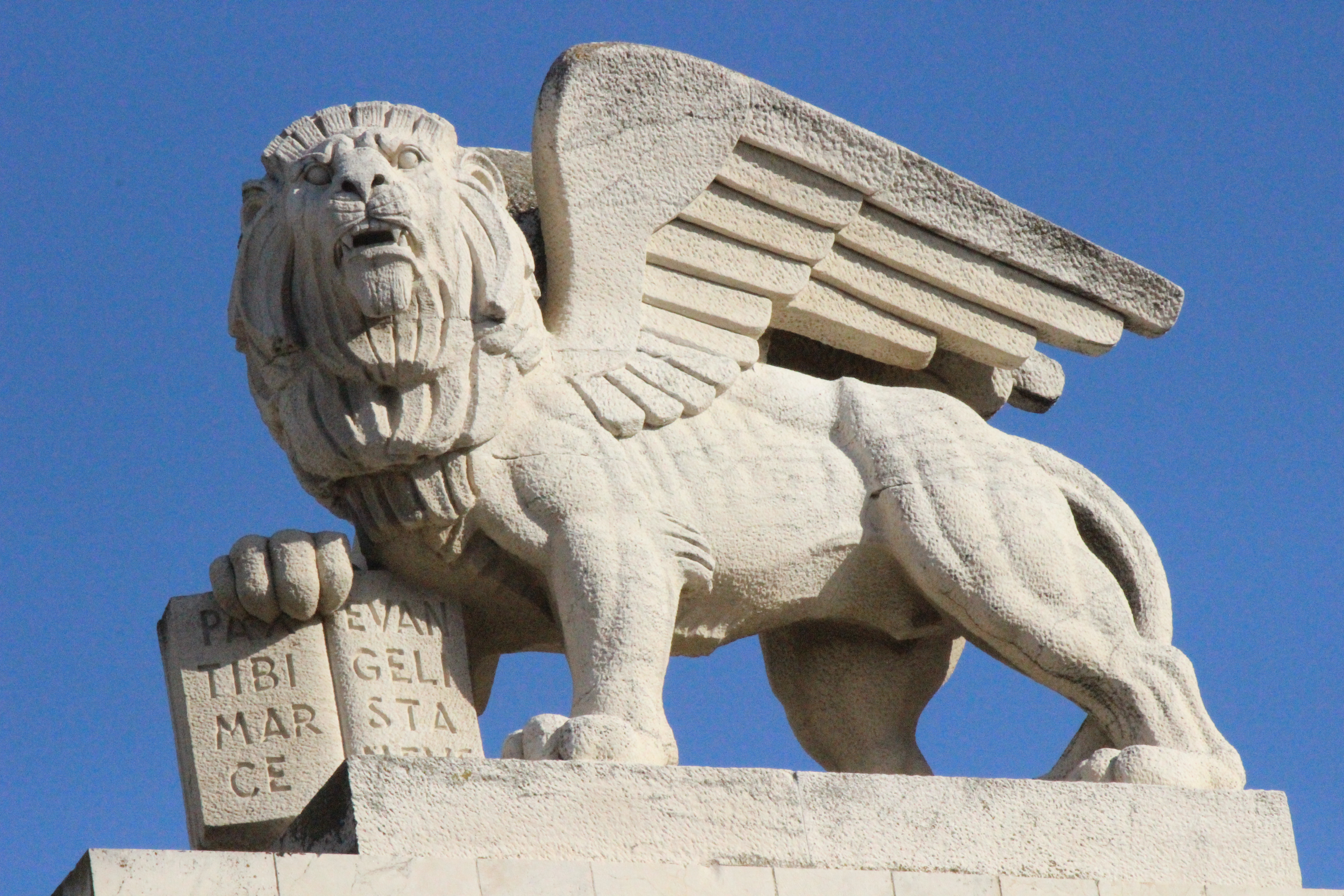
Close-up of Lion of Saint Mark statue on the roof

Situated at the intersection of Jaffa Road and Queen Shlomzion Street, the sides of the triangular-shaped Generali Building splay out in a V-shape, with the corner facing the intersection designed like the prow of a ship. The first story is faced with roughly-dressed stone and has arched windows and doorways. The upper stories, in contrast, are faced with finely-dressed stone and have windows and balconies opening at right angles, along with horizontal stone protrusions demarcating each story. Due to the topography of the site, the building has five stories at its western end and a wing of six stories at its eastern end.

Atop the roof is a large stone sculpture of a winged lion leaning on an open book. While many observers mistakenly attribute this symbol to the Lion of Judah, emblem of the city of Jerusalem, it is in fact the Lion of Saint Mark, patron saint of Venice, and the symbol of the Generali insurance company. This symbol has appeared on all of the company's branches worldwide since 1848. The Latin words engraved on the stone book are Pax Tibi Marce Evangelista Meus (Peace unto you, Mark, my Evangelist). On the base of the sculpture are engraved the Roman numerals MDCCCXXXI, or 1831, the year that Assicurazioni Generali was founded. The sculpture was constructed in six sections and produced by Jerusalem artist David Ozhernesky together with two Italian assistants. The name of the insurance company appears in relief under the roof line.

== History ==
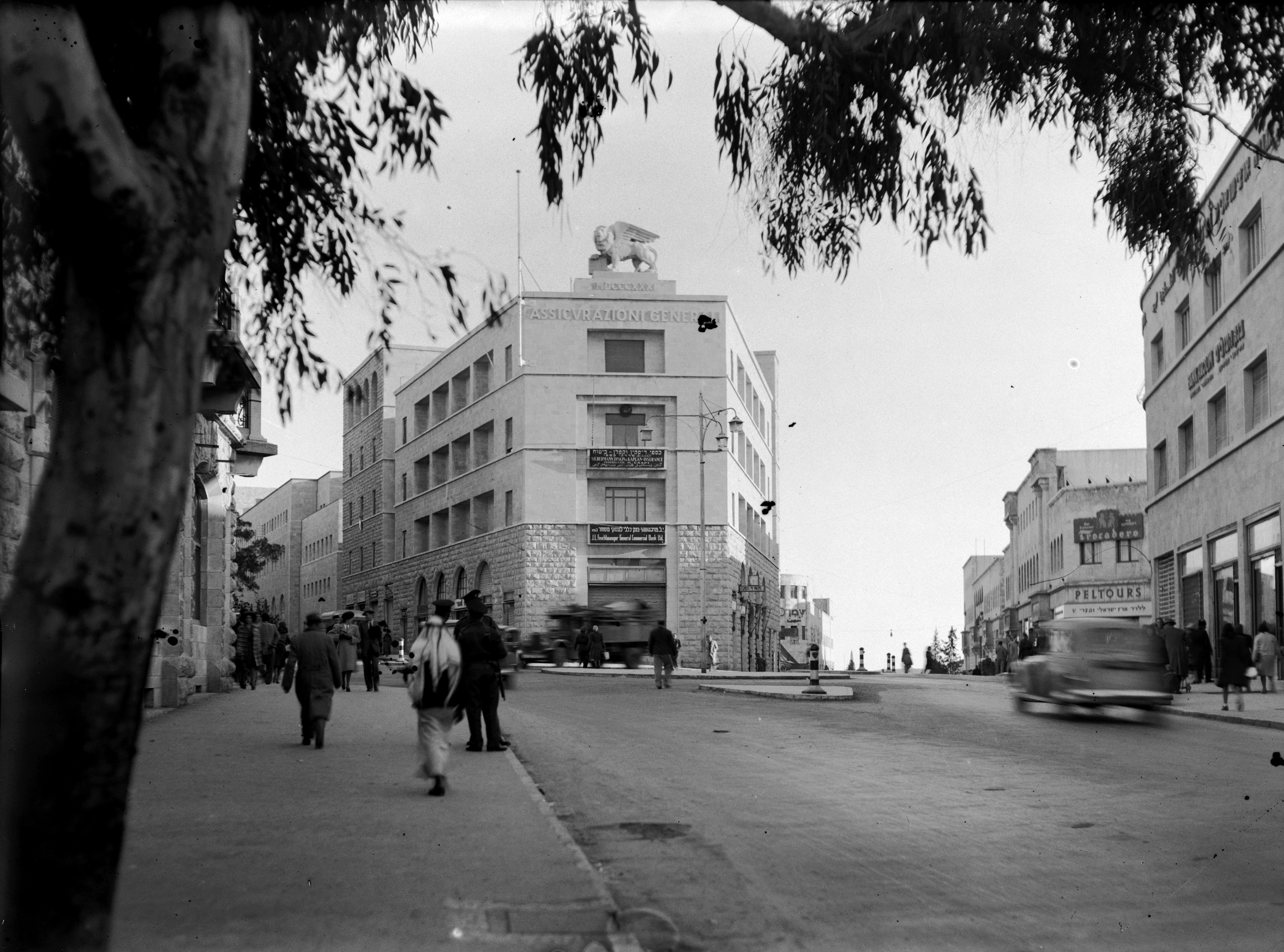
Generali Building, 1938

The Generali Building was one of three commercial structures built at the eastern end of Jaffa Road in the 1930s. The others, constructed by the British, were the Anglo-Palestine Bank (currently Bank Leumi) and the Central Post Office.

In 1931, Assicurazioni Generali, marking its centenary since its founding in Trieste, Italy, in 1831, decided to open a branch in Jerusalem. It acquired the lot in downtown Jerusalem – which was being used as a bus parking lot – from British Mandate officials. The company hired Jewish-Palestinian architect Richard Kauffmann, designer of Jerusalem garden suburbs such as Rehavia, Beit Hakerem, and Talpiot, to draw up a plan. Kaufmann submitted a plan for a seven-story structure in International Style, with "a rounded corner and flowing lines". Company executives rejected Kaufmann's plan and turned to Italian architect Marcello Piacentini, chief architect of the Italian Fascist regime, for an alternative. Piacentini submitted a design for a triangular building that combined neoclassical and modern elements with a subdued and "non-jarring" appearance, a common look in 1930s Fascist architecture in Italy. Piacentini's plan was accepted and the De Farro firm was hired to begin construction in 1934.

The building was completed in 1935. The Jerusalem branch of the Assicurazioni Generali insurance company occupied the main floor of the building from 1935 to 1946. Office space on upper floors and shops at street level were rented out to private businesses.

=== Bevingrad ===
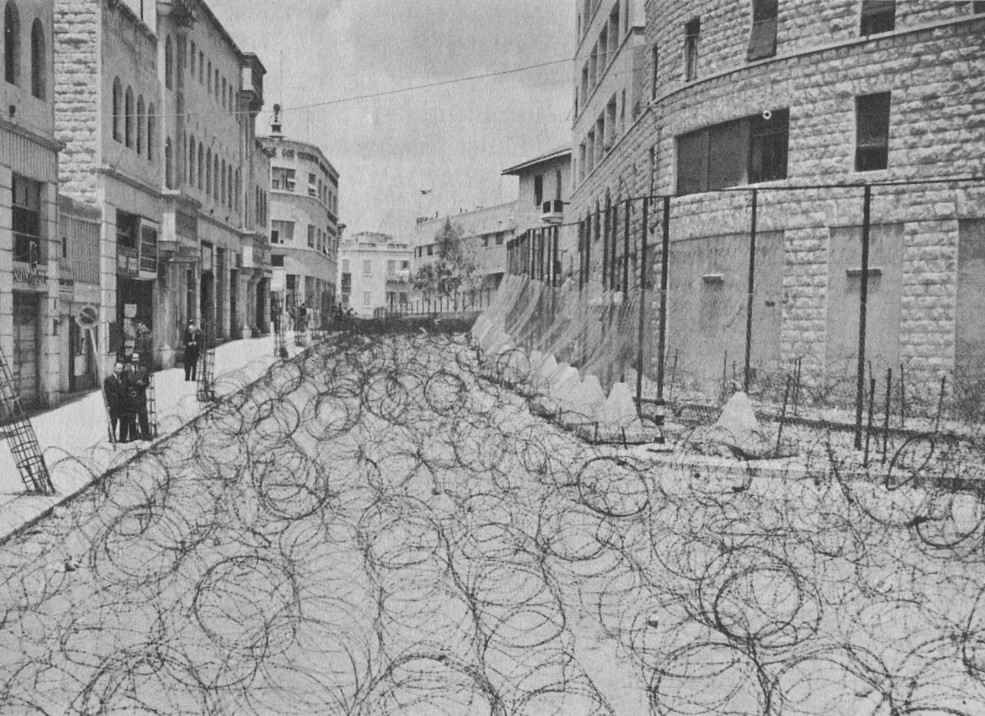
Partial view of Princess Mary Street (today Queen Shlomzion Street) in Bevingrad. The Generali Building is at right.

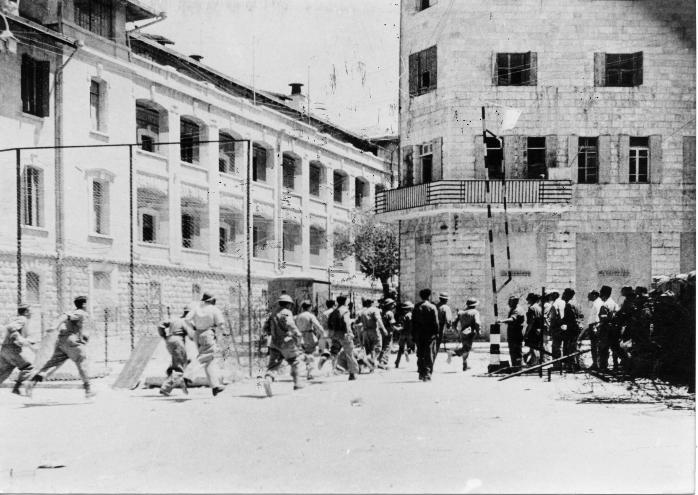
Irgun taking the Generali Building following the British evacuation, 1948

Beginning in 1944, the Irgun stepped up its attacks against British installations in Palestine, prompting the British to begin fortifying those installations. Security zones with huge coils of barbed wire filling the streets and dragon's teeth blocking the incursion of armed vehicles began appearing around Jerusalem. Jerusalemites called the fortified zones "Bevingrad", a portmanteau of the name of the British Foreign Secretary Ernest Bevin, who had denied Holocaust survivors entry to Palestine, and the Russian city of Stalingrad, where large-scale fortifications had been emplaced prior to the 1942 Battle of Stalingrad.

One such zone, established in 1946, encompassed the eastern end of Jaffa Road and included the Russian Compound, the Anglo-Palestine Bank, the Central Post Office, and the Generali Building. That same year, the British had evacuated the Generali Building of its tenants and nationalized the building. From 1946 to 1948 the Generali Building housed several British military functions, including the main quartermaster. A machine gun was mounted on the "middle balcony" of the Generali Building and trained on Jaffa Road.

On 14 May 1948, when the British Mandatory government pulled out of Palestine, Irgun fighters mounted Operation Kilshon to take the Bevingrad buildings. The first one to be recovered was the Generali Building, where fighters hoisted the Israeli flag over the lion sculpture on the roof before continuing on to take control of the Russian Compound.

== Current tenants ==
The building houses government offices, including the Jerusalem District Administration, the Ministry of Interior, the Department of Immigration and Population Registry, and the Internal Auditing Office. Long-time businesses at street level include a branch of Union Bank of Israel and Rejwan Travel Service, one of the oldest travel agencies in Jerusalem.

An Israel Meteorological Service measuring station has operated on the roof of the Generali Building since December 1949. In January 1993 this station was upgraded with an "automatic observation post" that generates weather data every ten minutes. In January 1974 the station recorded the strongest gust of wind ever in Israel, measuring 159 kilometres per hour (99 mph).
