= Operation Shfifon =

1948 Zionist paramilitary operation

Coordinates: 31°46′33.77″N 35°13′52.94″E

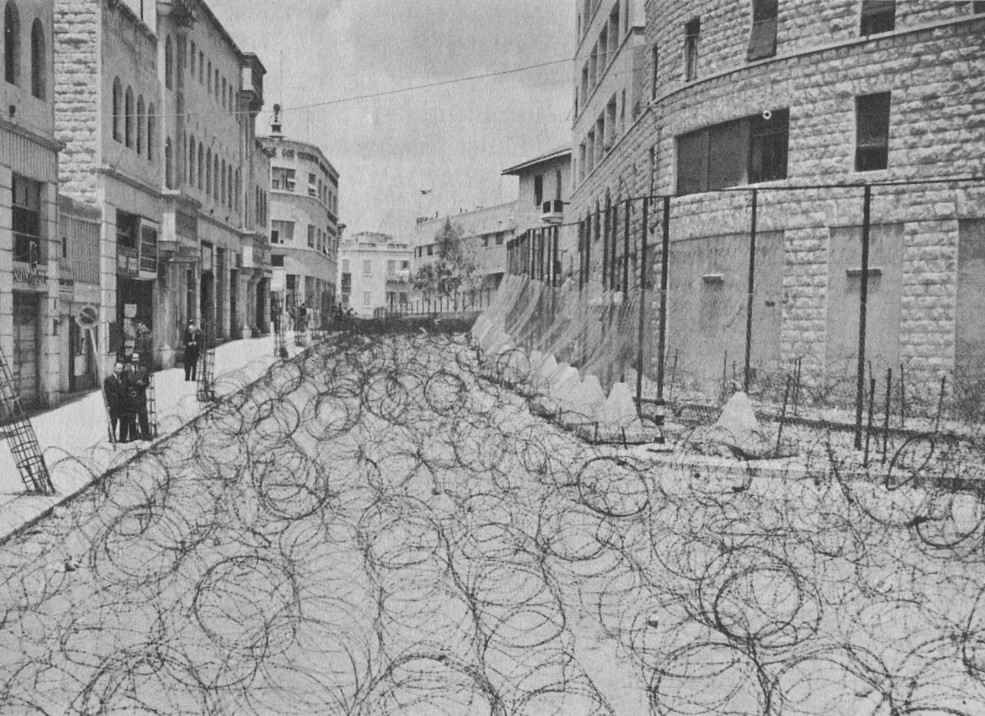
Princess Mary Street in Jerusalem, 1948, blocked by barbed wire, was dubbed "Bevingrad". The building on the right is the Generali Building, which housed the British main quartermaster.

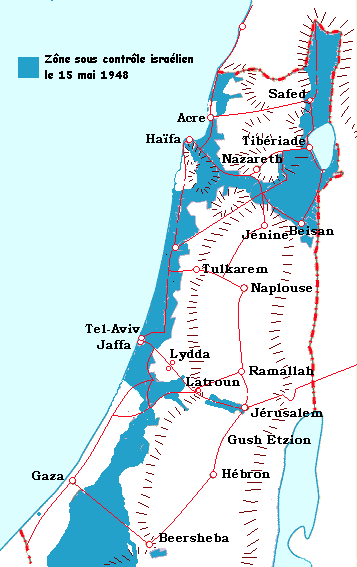
Area under Israeli control on 15 May 1948

On May 13, 1948, a day before the state of Israel was proclaimed, the Haganah launched Operation Shfifon (Hebrew: מבצע שפיפון, lit. Operation Cerastes Cerastes) with the aim of capturing the British outposts in the Old City of Jerusalem and preventing the Arab forces from taking control of them first. Such an eventuality had long been anticipated, and plans prepared called Operation Shfifon ('horned viper'; some translate it as 'Serpent') and quickly followed by Operation Kilshon.

== See also ==
- List of battles and operations in the 1948 Palestine war
- 1947–48 Civil War in Mandatory Palestine
- Depopulated Palestinian locations in Israel
