= Hish (Haganah corps) =

Corps of the Haganah in Mandatory Palestine

Hish (Heil HaSadeh)
- חי״ש (חיל השדה)
- Hish insignia
- Active: 1939–1948
- Country: British Mandate of Palestine
- Branch: Haganah
- Type: Corps
- Role: Field operations, defense of Jewish settlements
- Size: 9,500 members (1939)
- Part of: Haganah
- Engagements: 1936–1939 Arab revolt in Palestine, 1947–1949 Palestine war, 1948 Arab–Israeli War

Hish (Hebrew: חי״ש, a Hebrew acronym for Heil HaSadeh (Hebrew: חיל השדה), lit. Field Corps) was a corps formed by the Haganah in the British Mandate of Palestine in 1939, following the disbandment of the smaller mobilized force known as the Posh. It was the Haganah's main surface corps, alongside Him and the Palmach.

== History ==
1939 was a turning point for the Jewish Defence forces. Orde Wingate was transferred out of Palestine and the Fosh was replaced by a less mobile but permanent "Field Force/Corps", Heil Sadeh or Hish. The forces were formed with men with basic military training into Home Guard units, Heil Mishmar, Him. With Plugot Meyuhadot (Pum) as covert "Special Companies" to wage a counter terror war against the Arabs. Hish had 9,500 members, largely untrained, ranging in age from 18 to 25.

Hish consisted of the Levanoni Brigade, Carmeli Brigade, Golani Brigade, Kiryati Brigade, Alexandroni Brigade, Etzioni Brigade, Givati Brigade and Oded Brigade.
