= Guard Corps (Haganah) =

Corps of the Haganah in Mandatory Palestine

- Active: 1939–1948
- Country: Israel
- Branch: Infantry Corps
- Type: Rear security forces
- Size: Corps
- Part of: Haganah; Israel Defense Forces
- Engagements: Israel Independence War

Heil Mishmar (abbreviated HIM; Hebrew: חיל המשמר) was the guard corps of the Haganah, a Jewish paramilitary organization in Mandatory Palestine.

== History ==
HIM was founded in 1939, following the 1936–1939 Arab revolt in Palestine. It included mostly older and less healthy soldiers (usually between 35 and 50), while those who were able to participate in field combat were drafted into the Field Corps and later also Palmach. At the end of World War II, the Guard Corps consisted of more than 30,000 members country-wide. It was responsible for guarding Jewish villages from attacks, especially from opposing Arab militias.

Members of the Guard Corps participated in Operation Betzer in Tel Aviv in August 1948. This imposed a curfew and mandatory reporting of men aged 17-50 and women aged 16-35 for potential service. A sweep was also conducted for draft evaders and deserters. Some 1,044 men and 1,720 were arrested.
