= Ruth Etzioni =

American biostatistician

- Education: University of Cape Town; Carnegie Mellon University
- Scientific career
- Fields: Biostatistics, cancer research
- Workplaces: Fred Hutchinson Cancer Research Center

Ruth D. Etzioni is a biostatistician who develops statistical computer models to research cancer progression. She is the Rosalie and Harold Rea Brown endowed chair at the Fred Hutchinson Cancer Research Center.

== Life ==
Etzioni completed a B.S. in statistics at the University of Cape Town in 1985. She earned a M.S. (1987) and Ph.D. (1990) in Statistics at Carnegie Mellon University. She was a postdoctoral researcher in the department of biostatistics at the University of Washington from 1991 to 1992.

Etzioni joined the faculty at the Fred Hutchinson Cancer Research Center in 1992 as an associate in the biostatistics program. Her research interests include the development and implementation of statistical methods for prostate cancer studies. She held multiple positions before her promotion to full member of the public health sciences division in 2002. Etzioni was elected a fellow of the American Statistical Association in April 2016. As of 2016, her research focuses on the development of statistical computer models to learn about the latent process of cancer progression from observed data on disease incidence and mortality. Etzioni became the inaugural recipient of the Rosalie and Harold Rea Brown endowed chair in 2020.
