= Chapel of Our Lady of Jerusalem =

- קפלת גבירתנו של ירושלים
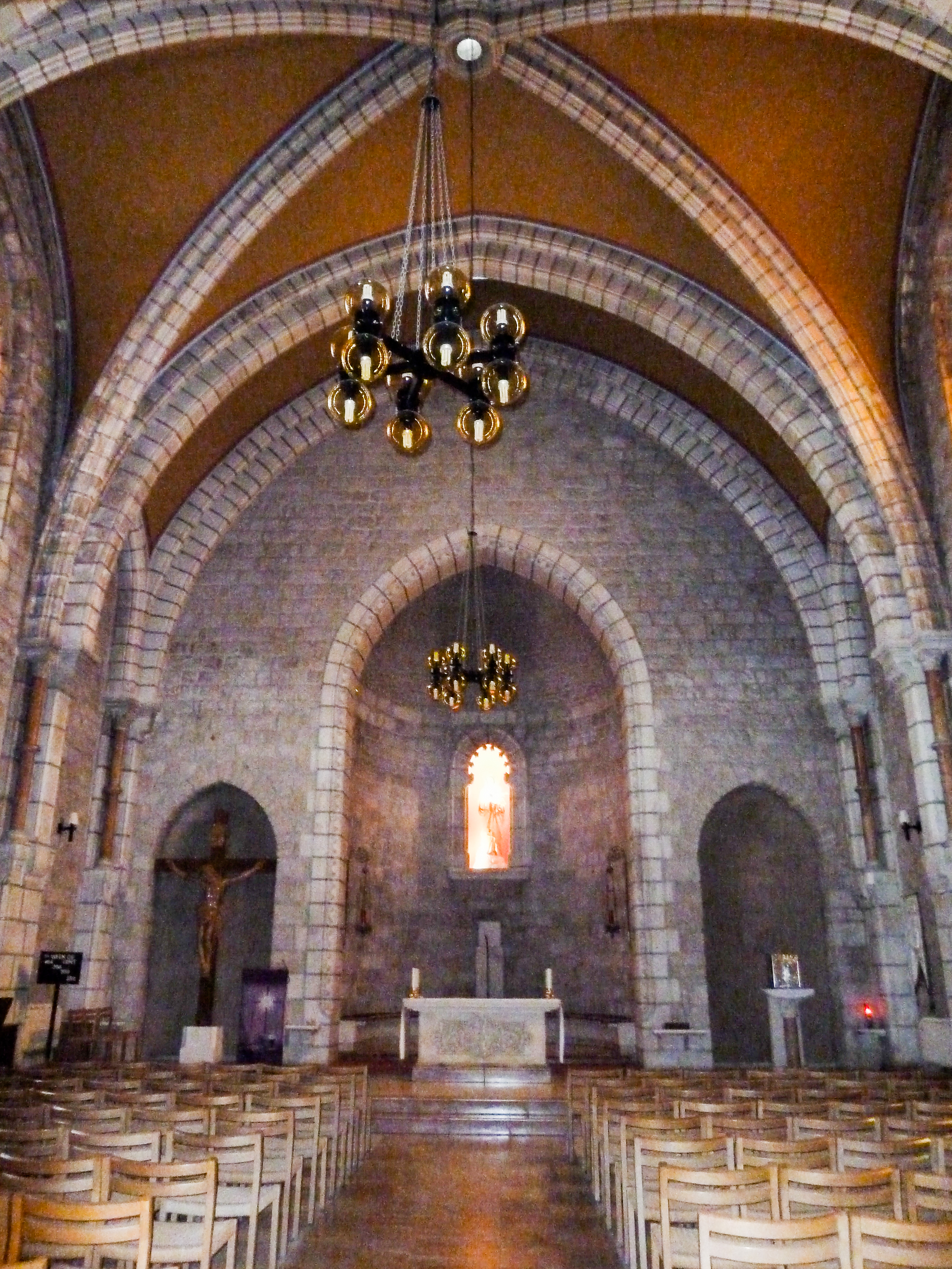
- Location: Jerusalem
- Denomination: Catholic Church

The Chapel of Our Lady of Jerusalem (Hebrew: קפלת גבירתנו של ירושלים, French: Chapelle Notre-Dame-de-Jérusalem) or Chapel of Notre Dame or Our Lady of Peace Chapel, is a religious building affiliated with the Catholic Church which is located in the complex of the Notre Dame of Jerusalem Center (formerly known as Notre Dame de France, or Our Lady of France) which was built by French religious between 1893 and 1894 in Jerusalem, as part of a larger group of buildings known as the Hospice of Our Lady of France, which was built mostly in stone with "defensive" purposes. It was built in a symmetrical, neoclassical style, supplemented by Oriental style battlements on the roof.

French pilgrims financed the construction of the complex. A group of 1000 French Catholics had no accommodation when they went on pilgrimage to Jerusalem as part of Le Grand Caravan de Mille in 1882. Consequently Marie Paul Amedee De Piellat collected the money to construct the Complex.

In 1948 Israeli military forces occupied the chapel as a base to launch attacks during their War of Independence. It was completely renovated in the 1970s.

== See also ==
- Media related to Notre Dame of Jerusalem Chapel at Wikimedia Commons
- Catholic Church in Israel
- Latin Patriarchate of Jerusalem

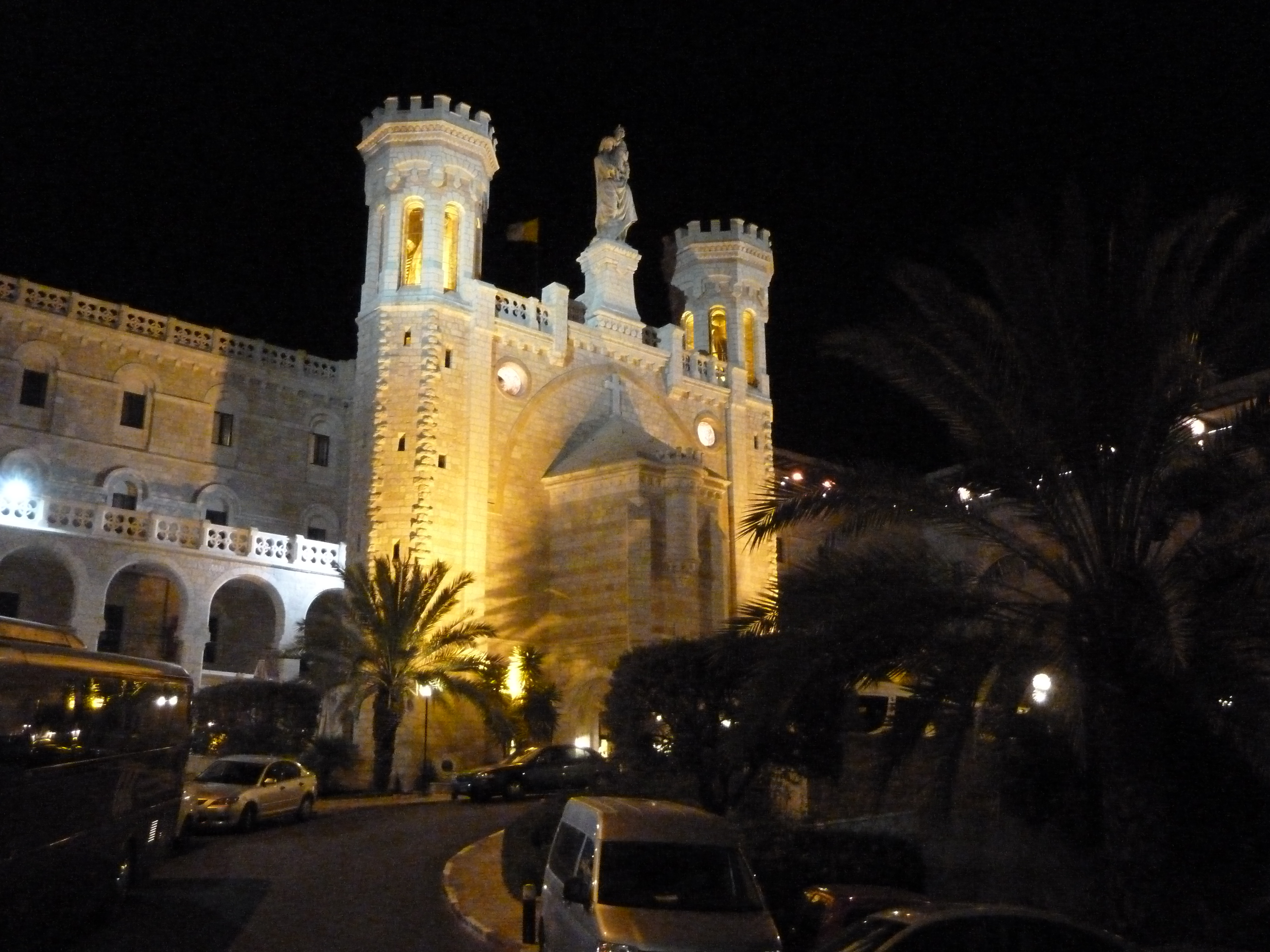
The Notre Dame of Jerusalem Center
