= Operation Kedem =

Zionist militia plan to take East Jerusalem

Coordinates: 31°46′41.18″N 35°13′32.16″E

- Part of the 1948 Arab–Israeli War
Date	14–17 July 1948
Location	East Jerusalem
Result	Jordanian victory
Territorial changes	Jordan captures East Jerusalem including the Old City of Jerusalem

Belligerents
Israel; Israel Defense Forces; Etzion Brigade; Irgun; Lehi	Transjordan; Arab Liberation Army

Casualties and losses
17 killed (Malha); Unknown (Old City)	Unknown

Operation Kedem was an action planned and carried out by Irgun and Lehi forces in July 1948, during the 1948 Arab–Israeli war. Its purpose was to capture East Jerusalem, including the Old City. After the first cease-fire of the war, which lasted for four weeks, the balance in power in Jerusalem had shifted dramatically. Israel was now much stronger than the Arabs in the Jerusalem sector. However, Irgun and Lehi attempts to break through the wall into the Old City failed.

== Operation ==
The operation was to be carried out by in part by Irgun and Lehi forces. Their units were now coordinated by the newly formed IDF, but were still independent. The attack was to take place on July 8 with help from the IDF's Etzion Brigade, but it was delayed by David Shaltiel. He told them to first capture the Arab village of Malha. On July 14, 1948, after a fierce battle in the early morning hours, the Irgun occupied the village. Several hours later, the Arabs launched a counterattack. Reinforcements arrived and the village was retaken by the Arabs. The Irgun lost 17 men in the battle for Malha, and many were wounded.

The Irgun force commanded by Yehuda Lapidot (Nimrod) was to break through at the New Gate, the Lehi force was to break through the wall stretching from the New Gate and Jaffa Gate, and the Etzion brigade's Beit Horon Battalion was to strike from Mount Zion.

The battle was planned to begin on Shabbat, 20:00 Friday July 16, a day before the second cease-fire of the Arab–Israeli War. The plan went wrong from the beginning. It was first postponed to 23:00 and then to midnight. The battle did not actually begin until 02:30. The Irgun force managed to break through at the New Gate, but the other forces failed in their missions. At 05:45, Shaltiel gave the order to cease hostilites and retreat.

== Brigades participating in Operation Kedem ==
- Etzioni Brigade (Beit Horon Battalion)
- Irgun
- Lehi

== See also ==
- List of battles and operations in the 1948 Palestine war
- Depopulated Palestinian locations in Israel
