= Yisrael Amir =

First commander of the Israeli Air Force (1902–2002)

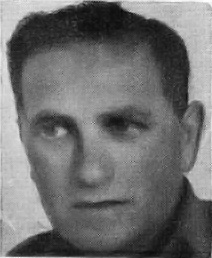
- Native name: ישראל עמיר
- Born: 11 November 1902; Vilnius, Russian Empire
- Died: 1 November 2002 (aged 99) Tel Aviv, Israel
- Allegiance: Israel
- Branch: Haganah; Israeli Air Force
- Service years: 1929–1948 (Haganah); 1948–1969 (IDF)
- Rank: Sgan Aluf
- Commands: Sherut Avir, Commander; Israeli Air Force, Commander
- Engagements: World War II (1939–1945); Israeli War of Independence (1947–1949); Second Arab–Israeli War (1956); Third Arab–Israeli War (1967); Arab–Israeli War of Attrition (1967–1970)

Yisrael Amir (Hebrew: ישראל עמיר; 11 November 1902 – 1 November 2002) was the first commander of the Israeli Air Force.

== Early life and biography ==
Amir was born into a Lithuanian Jewish family with the surname Zabludovsky on 11 November 1902 in the city of Vilnius in the Russian Empire (now Lithuania). He immigrated to the British Mandate of Palestine in 1923, where he joined the newly formed Haganah, a paramilitary force of the Palestinian Jewish community known as the Yishuv.

== Air Force career ==
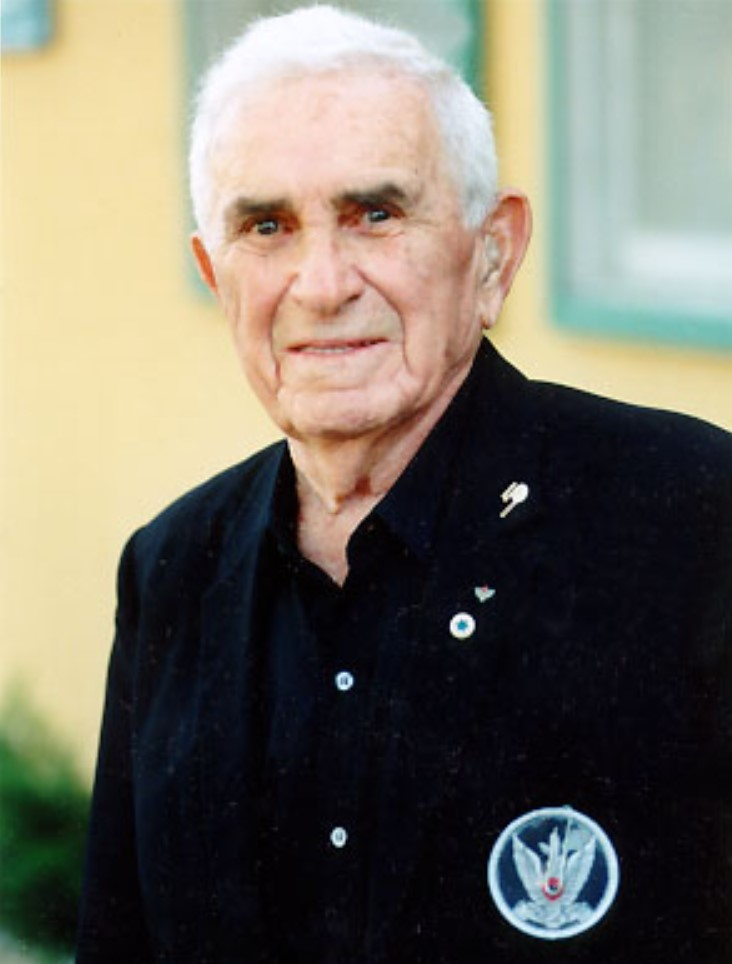
Amir in 1997

The aftermath of the Israeli Declaration of Independence on 14 May 1948 saw the formation of the Israel Defense Forces, primarily from the ranks of the Haganah paramilitary force and local veterans of the British military. The aerial wing of the Haganah, known as the Sherut Avir, was reorganized as the Israeli Air Force, and Amir was appointed as its first commander by Israeli Prime Minister David Ben-Gurion on 16 May. Sherut Avir had until this point only operated a small collection of aged and non-military aircraft, and the procurement of modern military-grade aircraft posed a significant problem for the new air force; Amir immediately secured an order of several Messerschmitt Bf 109 fighters from Allied-occupied Germany and B-17 Flying Fortress bombers from the United States, which were ferried into Israel through Czechoslovakia. He retired from his military career in 1969, one year before the conclusion of the War of Attrition with Egypt. Amir died at a hospital in the city of Tel Aviv on 1 November 2002, aged 99.
