= Operation Pitchfork =

Haganah operation

Coordinates: 31°46′51.49″N 35°13′24.44″E

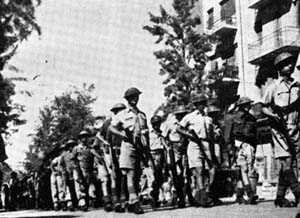
An Irgun formation during Operation Pitchfork

From 13–18 May 1948 Jewish forces from the Haganah and Irgun executed Operation Pitchfork (Mivtza Kilshon). Its aim was 'to safeguard the Jewish area of Jerusalem ... in face of the [expected] penetration by ... mechanized and armored forces of the regular armies of the Arab states.' This involved the capture of the Jewish suburbs of Jerusalem and several largely Arab neighborhoods such as Talbiya in central Jerusalem.

== Background ==
The End of the British Mandate for Palestine was scheduled to take place on Saturday, 15 May. In an attempt to be impartial, the British decided to hand over local government installations to the majority community in each area. At midnight on Friday 14 May, the British declared their civil and military authority in Jerusalem to be at an end. In the morning they evacuated the city in two large convoys, one moved north towards Haifa and the other south towards Bethlehem. The British reached an agreement with the Haganah to hand over the "Bevingrad" ahead of time. They provided a schedule of their withdrawal in advance, and called the day of their departure to say when they would be finished leaving. The operation was then able to be launched almost immediately.

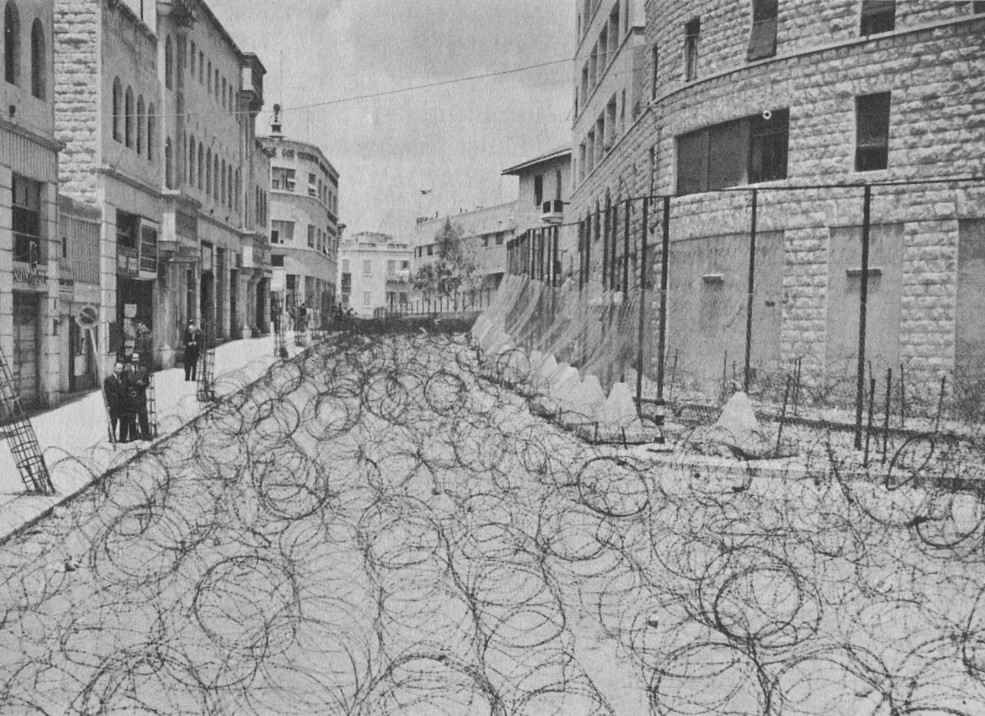
Princess Mary Street in Jerusalem, 1948, blocked by barbed wire, was dubbed "Bevingrad" after Ernest Bevin. The building on the right is the Generali Building, which housed the British main quartermaster.

== Operation ==
The Yishuv forces quickly managed to take control of buildings that the British had nationalized in "Bevingrad" zones. These were heavily fortified security zones that the British had built up around key installations in the city to protect against Irgun attacks. From 1946 to 1948, security zones with huge coils of barbed wire filling the streets and dragon's teeth blocking the incursion of armed vehicles began appearing around Jerusalem.

One such zone, established in 1946, encompassed the eastern end of Jaffa Road and included the Russian Compound, the Anglo-Palestine Bank, the Central Post Office, and the Generali Building. Jerusalemites called these fortified zones "Bevingrad", a portmanteau of the name of the British Foreign Secretary Ernest Bevin, who had denied Holocaust survivors entry to Palestine, and the Russian city of Stalingrad, where large-scale fortifications had been emplaced prior to the 1942 Battle of Stalingrad.

On Friday, 14 May 1948, the Irgun forces headed for the Bevingrad on Jaffa Road. The first building they captured was the Generali Building, now evacuated. The Irgun forces hoisted the Israeli flag over the lion statue on the roof before moving on to take control of the Russian Compound and the Police Academy further north.

They also captured the Notre Dame Church, the American Colony, Sheikh Jarrah, Talbiya, German Colony, Baka, Talpiot, and the Greek Colony.

A large portion of what was captured was to become the Israeli-controlled portion of Jerusalem—"West Jerusalem"—but some of the heaviest battles of the 1948 Arab-Israeli war were to follow and the Jerusalem frontier was to be redrawn many times.

== See also ==
- 1947–48 Civil War in Mandatory Palestine
- List of battles and operations in the 1948 Palestine war
- Depopulated Palestinian locations in Israel
