= Greek Colony, Jerusalem =

Neighborhood in Jerusalem

Greek Colony המושבה היוונית
- Neighborhood
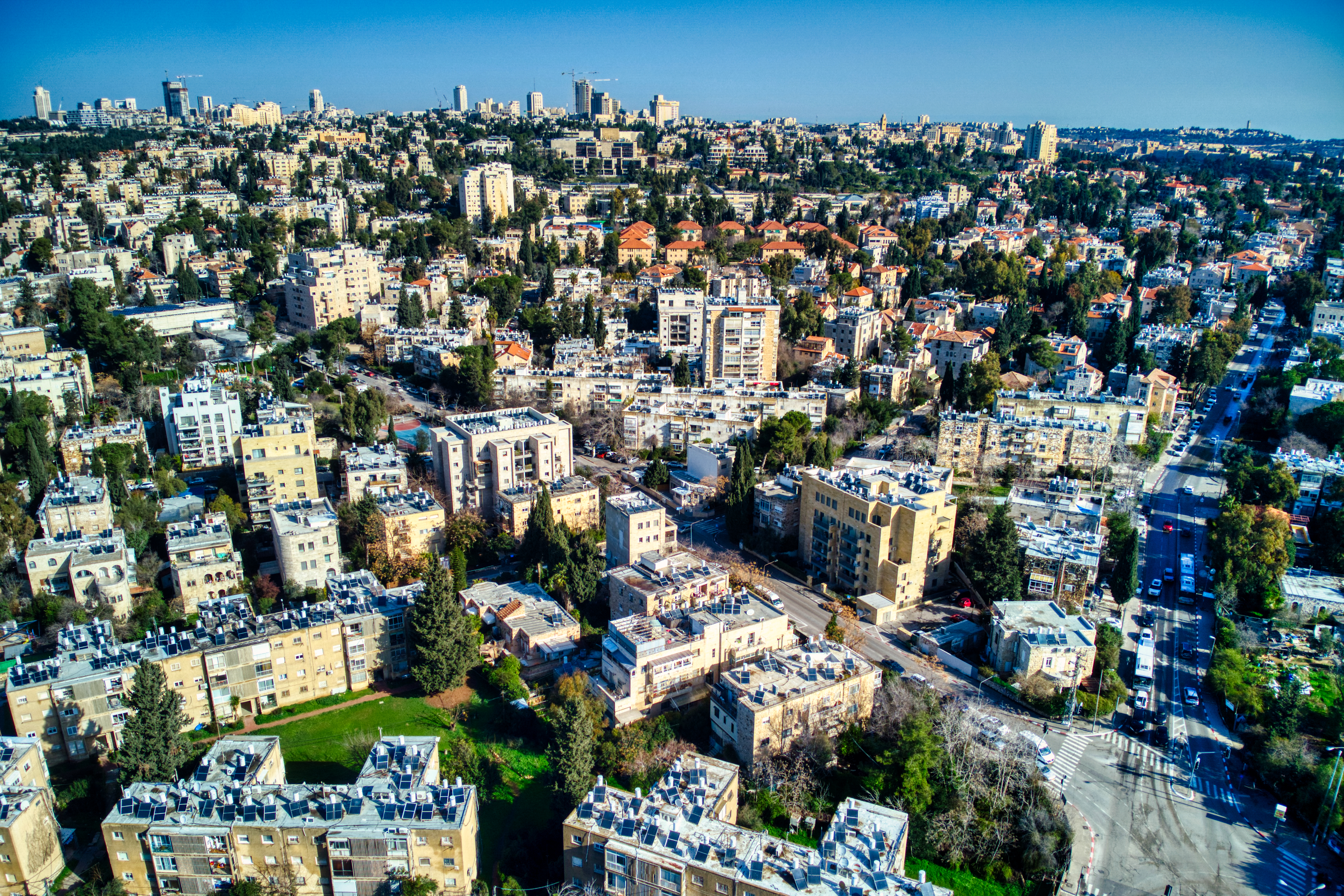
- Greek Colony, Jerusalem
- Interactive map of Greek Colony
- City: Jerusalem
- Established: Early 20th century

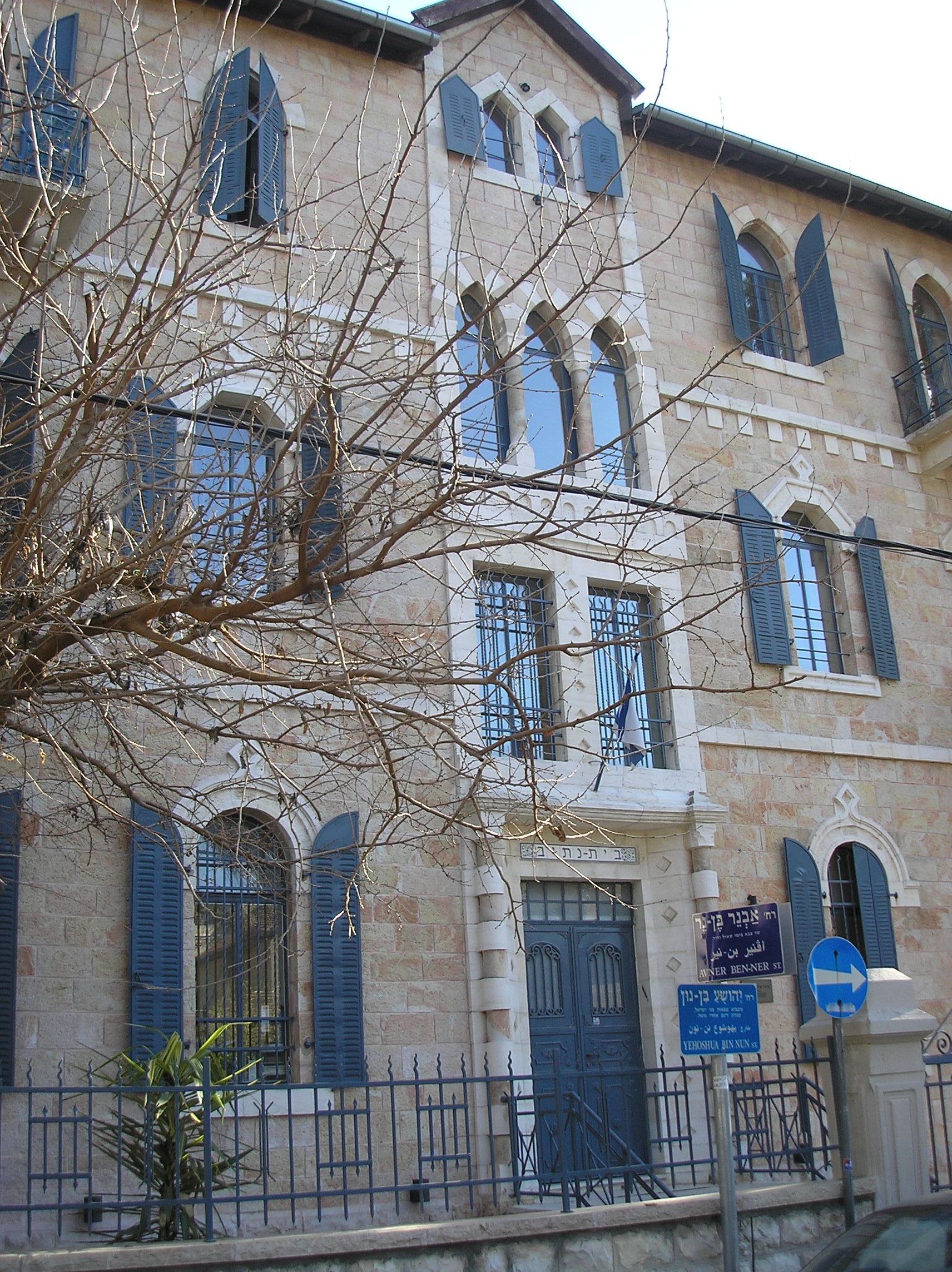
House in the Greek Colony

The Greek Colony (Hebrew: המושבה היוונית, HaMoshava HaYevanit) is a neighborhood in Jerusalem, bordering the German Colony and Katamon.

== History ==
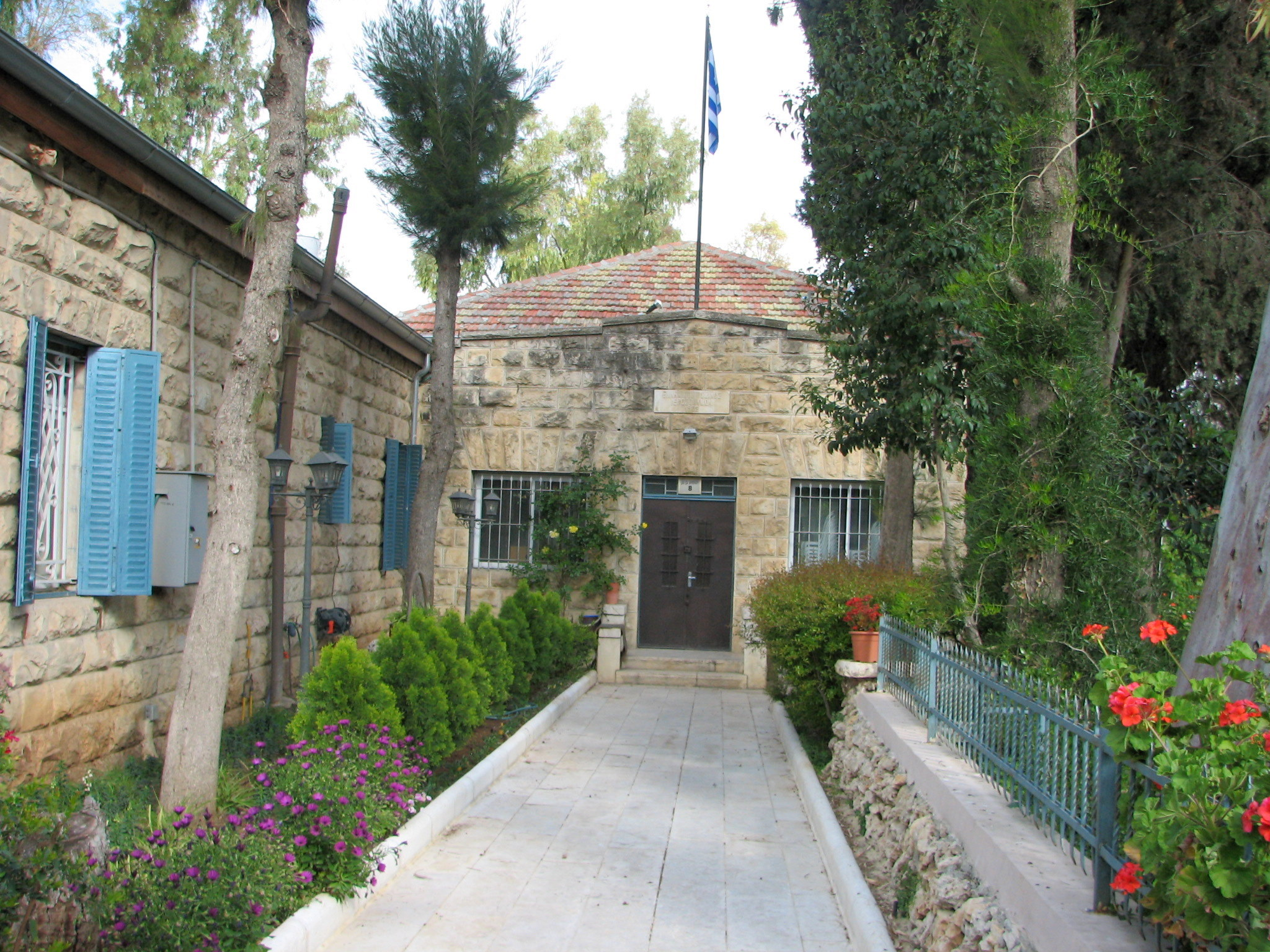
Greek Colony community center

The lands of the Greek Colony were purchased by wealthy members of the Greek Orthodox community in the early 20th century. Archimandrite Euthymios (Greek: Ευθύμιος) of the Church of the Holy Sepulchre encouraged them to establish a neighborhood outside the Old City's overcrowded Christian Quarter. Architect Spyro Houris (Greek: Σπύρος Χουρής) designed the first twenty homes and a community center before World War I. Most of the Greek Orthodox residents fled before the 1947–1949 Palestine war in 1948. After the war, apartment blocks were hastily built to accommodate large numbers of Jewish immigrants from Yemen and Morocco.

In the 21st century, the neighborhood underwent gentrification and is now one of the most expensive in Jerusalem.

The Greek Colony community center, consisting of five buildings, organizes regular cultural activities that include traditional Greek dancing and Greek language classes.

The Greek Consulate in Jerusalem is located in the Greek Colony, at the junction of Rachel Imeinu and Tel Chai.

A popular attraction in the neighborhood is the Greek Community Center, built in the year 1902 at Joshua Bin Nun Street. The community center, Beit Elisheva, at the corner of Hizkiyahu and Elazar Hamodai, was built in 1962. The birthing hospital, Misgav Ledach, which was originally established in 1854 in the Old City of Jerusalem, funded by the Rothschild family, was later moved to the Greek Colony, and has been there since then.

== Archaeology ==
In July 2007, archaeological excavations in the Greek Colony prior to the construction of a residential building carried out by the Israel Antiquities Authority found remains of a northeast-southwest oriented wall. Based on the findings, it was probably the retaining wall of a farming terrace. Some ceramic finds dating to the Roman and Byzantine periods were unearthed, as well as a large stone quarter dating to the Byzantine period.
