= Central Post Office Building (Jerusalem) =

Coordinates: 31.780268°N 35.222286°E

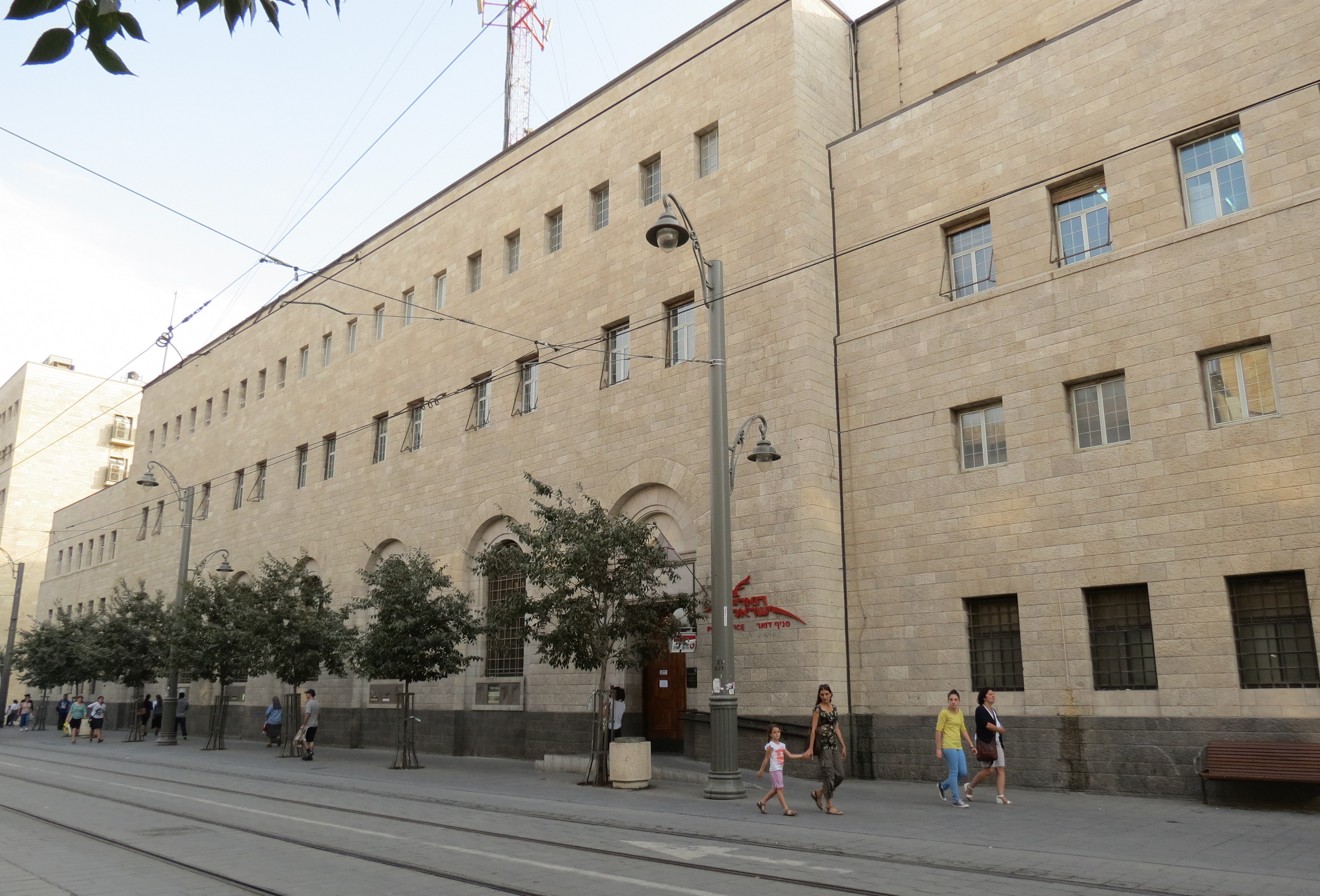
- Interactive map of the Central Post Office Building area

General information
- Type: Post office
- Location: Jerusalem
- Cost: £120,000

Design and construction
- Architect: Austen Harrison

The Central post office building is a British Mandate-era building on Jaffa Street in Jerusalem.

== History ==
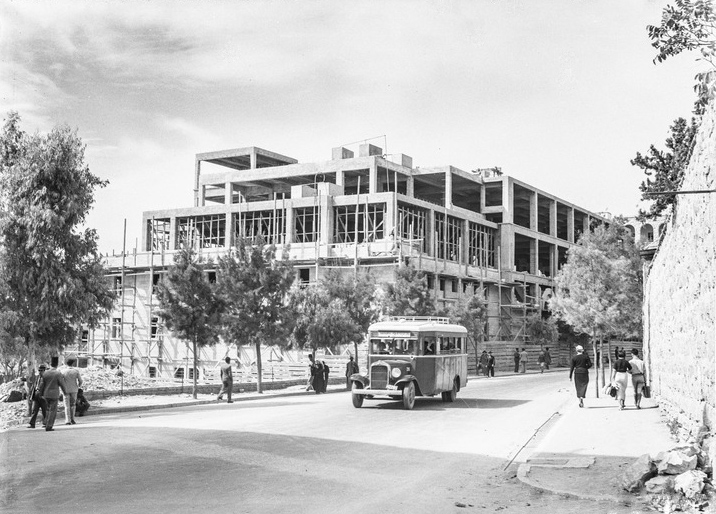
Building under construction, 1936

The building was built as General Post Office during the British Mandate, one of three government buildings in this area. Construction was between 1934 and 1938 to the design of the main architect of the public works department of the British Mandate, Austen Harrison and the Government architect Percy Harold Winter. The total cost was £120,000 for the building to house the administrative and engineering staff of Palestine Post, Telegraph & Telephone, the Jerusalem central telephone exchange and the Jerusalem post office. The opening ceremony was held on 18 June 1938, in the presence of the High Commissioner and hundreds of guests. The building is typical of the 'Mandatory' style.

== See also ==
- Architecture in Israel
