= A Wing and a Prayer (film) =

2015 television film

- Written by: Boaz Dvir
- Directed by: Boaz Dvir
- Starring: Al Schwimmer; Lou Lenart; Harold Livingston; Ralph Lowenstein
- Narrated by: William Baldwin
- Music by: Boaz Dvir and Bob Cubbage
- Country of origin: United States
- Original language: English

Production
- Producer: Boaz Dvir
- Cinematography: Boaz Dvir and Tim Sorel
- Running time: 60 minutes

Original release
- Network: PBS
- Release: April 5, 2015

A Wing and a Prayer is a 2015 PBS documentary by Boaz Dvir. The film predominantly covers the story of American pilot Al Schwimmer and his covert operation to deliver weapons to the Israeli Army prior to and during the 1948 Arab–Israeli War. It was first released on PBS to coincide with the 70th anniversary of the end of World War II.

== Synopsis ==
In 1948, months before what was considered an imminent Jewish State and an imminent invasion by neighboring countries such as Jordan and Egypt, the United States publicly announced their refusal to send military aid to Israel out of concern for antagonizing Middle Eastern countries during the Cold War.

Al Schwimmer had been a flight engineer of World War II, and he maintained many contacts after the war had ended. He used his World War II experience and contacts to illegally smuggle surplus rifles, machine guns, bullets and fighter planes to Israel. These supplies mainly came from Czechoslovakia, where many of the arms had been used by the Nazis. They arrived in Israel just as British rule ended, and Schwimmer returned to the United States to buy and smuggle out B-17 bombers. His men participated in the ensuing war. They took control of the skies and formed the Israeli Air Force.

In 1950, after turning themselves in, Schwimmer and nine of his men were convicted for violating the US Neutrality Acts for smuggling arms into Israel. Although they avoided prison sentences, they were stripped of their civil rights and fined $10,000 each.

Schwimmer refused to ask for a pardon, believing that smuggling weapons to help create a Jewish State was the moral decision to make. In 2001 President Bill Clinton pardoned Schwimmer.

The film ends listing the fates of many of the pilots who had flown on the mission, the last of which is Schwimmer himself, who died in 2011.

== Background ==
Boaz Dvir first became fascinated with the project after hearing about his grandfather's experiences in Israel following the Holocaust. "He told me in 1948 when he came to Israel, he was sent to the desert to fight," Dvir said. "When he got there, he thought he was going to die because his platoon had no weapons. One day they did get rifles. When he looked closely at his rifle, he saw a swastika on it." Neither of them knew where the weapons came from, so Dvir began research he figured would take a few days. The actual process took many years.

Dvir conducted lengthy interviews with Schwimmer one year before his death. He also interviewed 29 other veterans, family members and historians. Included was Lou Lenart and Harold Livingston. The interviewees were located predominantly in the United States and Israel, and Dvir made sure that each story was corroborated on by two independent sources for the sake of accuracy.

Many of the people he interviewed described their actions as preventing a "second Holocaust", something that Dvir had otherwise not considered. "I came to understand why they viewed a loss by Israel as a second Holocaust." Dvir said. "It would've meant the death of tens, possibly hundreds of thousands of people; the destruction of the only entity on Earth willing to take in Holocaust survivors; and the stamping out of the Jews' 2,000-year aspiration to return to their ancient homeland."

He put in seven years researching and producing the film (working on Jessie's Dad and Discovering Gloria simultaneously) on a modest budget of $135,000, half of which came out of pocket. Additional funds came from private donors. Dvir explained, "One [donor] led me to another who led me to another. There was a real commitment there in Miami to have the story told."

The film was narrated by William Baldwin, who was surprised he had never heard the story prior to working on the film. Baldwin said, "This is a story that should have been told decades ago."

== Release ==
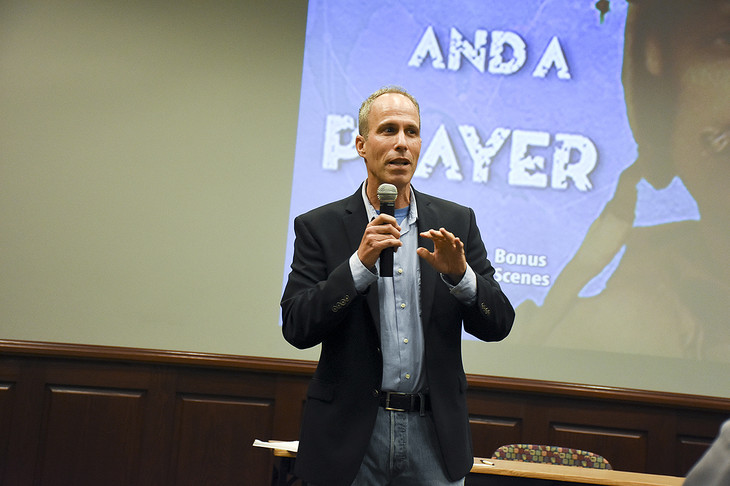
Boaz Dvir discusses his filmmaking process and the film "A Wing and a Prayer" during a screening at Penn State University.

The film premiered on PBS on April 5, 2015, and was screened at the American Jewish Historical Society in Manhattan on May 18, 2015. Its presenting station was notably South Florida PBS. Since then, more than 250 PBS stations around the country — including all top 30 markets — have aired the hour-long film during prime time. The American Jewish Historical Society, Columbia University, Syracuse University and other organizations have hosted special screenings in Manhattan, Paris, and other cities. The film was also an official selection for the Fort Lauderdale International Film Festival and for India's inaugural Library International Film Festival.

The film can be screened both on Amazon Prime and Hulu.

There was a screening of A Wing and A Prayer at the Los Angeles Museum of Tolerance on July 22, 2018. In March 2020, Penn State University's Holocaust Education Initiative, founded and run by Dvir, released free instructional materials for K-12 teachers. The instructional materials use "A Wing and a Prayer" to address difficult topics.

On November 8, 2020, Dvir presented "A Wing and a Prayer" in New York and New Zealand, hosted by the Sousa Mendes Foundation and B'nai B'rith, respectively.

== Awards ==
In 2016, the film was honored with the Award of Excellence at The IndieFest Film Awards, and won for Best Feature Documentary at the 2016 Fort Lauderdale International Film Festival.

== See also ==
- Israeli Air Force
- Jessie's Dad
- Discovering Gloria
