= Boaz Dvir =

Israeli-American professor, journalist, and filmmaker

- בועז דביר
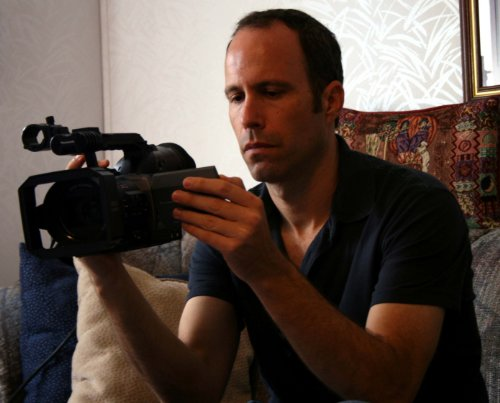
- Boaz preparing for a documentary shoot
- Born: June 23, 1967 (age 59); Petah Tikva, Israel
- Education: University of Florida
- Occupations: Director, Producer, Writer, Professor, Journalist

Boaz Dvir (Hebrew: בועז דביר; born June 23, 1967) is an Israeli-American professor, journalist, and filmmaker. His main work includes documentaries, most recently Class of Her Own, Jessie's Dad, and A Wing and a Prayer.

== Background ==
Filmmaker and Penn State associate professor Boaz Dvir tells the stories of ordinary people who, under extraordinary circumstances, transform into trailblazers and game changers. For instance, his PBS film, A Wing and a Prayer, recounts a World War II flight engineer's transformation into the leader of a secret operation to save newborn Israel.

Dvir grew up in Kfar Galim, a village in Israel, and moved to New Jersey when his father worked for the U.N. The family later moved to Florida and Dvir attended the University of Florida, where he earned a bachelor's degree in journalism and an MFA in creative photography. He also earned a master's from the UF Documentary Institute. Dvir is now the Donald P. Bellisario College Career Advancement Professor at Penn State.

He served as an officer and military journalist for the Israel Defense Force during The Gulf War in 1991, providing material to foreign correspondents, James Baker's office and then Israeli spokesman and current Prime Minister Benjamin Netanyahu. Dvir's grandfather, a Holocaust survivor, had fought in the 1948 Arab–Israeli War, and his experiences would have an influence on Dvir's work. "It really started as an interview with my grandfather. At that time I wasn’t even making documentaries."

He has written for many publications, including Newsday, The South Florida Sun-Sentinel, The Tampa Bay Times, TIME Magazine, the Philadelphia Inquirer, the Miami Herald, the Las Vegas Sun, The Satirist, Scripps Howard's Treasure Coast Newspapers, the Times of Israel, Explore magazine and The Jerusalem Post. Dvir served as editor of the Jacksonville Business Journal and managing editor of the South Florida Business Journal, which are part of Newhouse's American City Business Journals. For several years, he appeared on "Week in Review" and wrote commentaries for WJCT, Jacksonville's NPR/PBS station.

Dvir has won six Florida Magazine Association awards, including first place for his communigator column. He also won numerous awards from the Florida Press Association, including first place for his Business Journal column.

Dvir's films have won several prestigious awards. For instance, Class of Her Own won Best Documentary Feature at the 2024 Windsor International Black Film Festival in Canada and A Wing and a Prayer won Best Documentary in the 2016 Fort Lauderdale International Film Festival.

He lectured at the University of Florida for 10 years, and while there, directed and produced a DVD of documentary shorts to Professor Nancy Dana's inquiry book Digging Deeper into Action Research. He is currently an associate professor at Penn State University.

Dvir is in post-production on Cojot, a feature documentary that tells the story of a French banker who set out to kill former Nazi officer Klaus Barbie and ended up playing a pivotal role in Israel's 1976 Operation Entebbe.

Dvir's critically acclaimed films also include Jessie's Dad, which captures an uneducated truck driver's transformation into a national child-protection activist.

Dvir teamed up with Retro Report to produce a short documentary, "How Special Ops Became Central to the War On Terror," for The New York Times.

Lifetime and Investigation Discovery have incorporated footage from Dvir's documentaries into their programs. His films have received coverage by such media as Forbes, the Huffington Post, Haaretz, MSNBC, the New York Post, The Miami Herald, Stars and Stripes, the Los Angeles Jewish Journal, the Jewish Telegraphic Agency and Florida magazine.

Dvir created a documentary short about PALS, which helped the nonprofit that aids troubled teens receive an official nomination for a Nobel Peace Prize and raise hundreds of thousands of dollars in grants.

Dvir received a Lilly Endowment grant from the Religion News Service to research spiritual aspects of the Holocaust.

Published Jan, 31, 2020 by Rowman and Littlefield, Dvir's Saving Israel: The Unknown Story of Smuggling Weapons and Winning a Nation’s Independence tells the story of a secret, illegal operation by World War II aviators to save newborn Israel in 1948. In this critically acclaimed, 320-page nonfiction book, Dvir elaborates on his PBS documentary, A Wing and a Prayer.

The book was extremely well received with reviews from various outlets including, the Washington Times, the Jerusalem Post, and the Times of Israel. Defense and Foreign affairs author Geogery R. Copley also reviewed the book saying "The book, written in a journalistic style, tells a tale which not only is educational about the formation of Israel and the age into which it was born, but about the role which innovation and creativity can play in the saving of any society during a period of existential crisis. It is about how people discover their identity—which is usually in times of crisis—and how they can act to preserve that identity to create anew." Other reviewers include Thomas Van Hare (Historic Wings), Ralph Lowenstein (University of Florida College of Journalism), Miriam Elman (Syracuse University), Barbara Dury (former "60 Minutes" producer), and Richard Shyrock (Virginia Tech) Additionally, in September 2020, Saving Israel was named number 5 on the Oklahoma nonfiction bestsellers list.

Dvir has launched and is director of Penn State's Holocaust, Genocide and Human Rights Education Initiative and the Hammel Family Human Rights Initiative, which aim to give K-12 students the opportunities to develop critical thinking, fact-finding, active-listening and civic discourse skills, as well as empathy, by assisting educators in the effective instruction of a wide variety of difficult topics.

Dvir created the Holocaust, Genocide and Human Rights Education Initiative at Penn State in 2019 to enable K-12 educators to provide their students with the opportunities to gain critical thinking, fact finding, active listening and civic discourse skills, as well as empathy.

The Initiative is part of Penn State’s Hammel Family Human Rights Initiative, which Dvir also directs.

The Holocaust education initiative offers year- and semester-long programs, workshops and self-paced online modules.

High-caliber research conducted by the Hammel Family Human Rights Initiative has been published in three peer-reviewed journals. The papers illustrate how the initiative’s programs help K-12 educators address difficult issues such as racism. The three journals that published the papers are School-University Partnerships, Journal of Practitioner Research and Journal of Teacher Education. Some of the scholars who independently reviewed the papers described the Initiative’s research-based nonpartisan approach, which combines practitioner inquiry with trauma-informed and asset-based practices, as novel, innovative and widely needed.

As part of the initiatives, Dvir led a discussion in the Schreyer Honors College’s "Dialogues of Democracy," titled "Building a Stronger Democratic Future Through Pedagogical Innovation" in February 2024. In his keynote speech to kick off the Aspen School District’s 2023-24 school year, Dvir presented information about how educators can provide their students with insight into the human condition and opportunities to develop life skills such as critical thinking, active listening and empathy. Following another presentation made by Dvir in Aspen that summer, an anonymous donor awarded the initiative with $150,000Dvir and other Initiative members and graduate students presented early versions of the Initiative's instructional material at the Holocaust Center of Pittsburgh's summer 2019 teacher training. The material accompanies Dvir's post-Holocaust documentaries, "To Kill a Nazi" and "A Wing and a Prayer."

Dvir has also published various essays through multiple publications, including his Times of Israel blog. Some of his essays include: "World War II veterans offer pearls of wisdom" (Sept 2015) "Tree of Life first anniversary: How to teach tough topics to out kids" (October 2019) "In the wake of Tree of Life, education must be a priority" Post Gazette (Nov 2019) "The Obama policy Trump is thrilled to continue (Nov 2019) "Op-ed: In terrorism fight, Trump copied Obama" (Jan 2020) "Remembering my Savta, an Auschwitz survivor" (Jan 2020) "Biden and Trump Agree on strong US-Israel relations-Bernie, not so much" (March 2020) "Reopening’s Repercussions Reverberate" (May 2020) "White House to display Times Square-like Stock Ticker" (June 2020) "Unmasking the Cool Factor" (July 2020) "The Elusive Endpoint" (Sep 2020) "Trump Sues to Prevent 2021 Election Vote Counting" (Nov 2020)

In 2024, the Orlando Urban Film Festival nominated Dvir for Best Documentarian.

== Filmography ==
Year	Film
2011	Molding Master Teachers
2011	Jessie's Dad
2012	Inquiry as a Way of Being and Teaching
2015	A Wing and a Prayer
2018	El País de la Eterna Primavera (Land of the Eternal Spring)
2024	Class of Her Own
2025	To Kill a Nazi
2017	How Special Ops Became Central to the War on Terror
2019	How Israel Survived an Early Challenge
