= Sidekick (disambiguation) =

A sidekick is a close companion, generally the subordinate in the relationship.

Sidekick may also refer to:

== Media related ==
- Sidekick (film), a 2005 independent movie directed by Blake Van de Graaf
- Sidekick (TV series), a 2010 animated show
- "Sidekick" (My Hero), a 2006 television episode
- Sidekicks (1974 film), a TV movie starring Larry Hagman and Louis Gossett Jr.
- Sidekicks (1992 film), starring Chuck Norris and Jonathan Brandis
- Quick Step & Side Kick, a 1983 album by Thompson Twins, released in the USA and Canada as Side Kicks
- Sidekicks (album), 1992, by Tom Fogerty and Randy Oda
- "Sidekicks" (The Naked Brothers Band), a 2008 two-part TV episode
- Sidekicks (TV series), a 1986 martial arts series
- "The Sidekick" (The Amazing World of Gumball), a television episode
- "Sidekick", a song by 2hollis from Star, 2025
- "Sidekick", a song by Man Overboard from Real Talk, 2010

== Other ==
- Borland Sidekick, a computer program
- T-Mobile Sidekick, a line of mobile phone and communication devices
- Suzuki Sidekick, a compact SUV
- Super Sidekicks, a soccer video game series for the Neo-Geo
- Dallas Sidekicks (2012), a team in the Professional Arena Soccer League
- Dallas Sidekicks (1984–2004), a former professional soccer team of the MISL, CISL, and WISL

== See also ==
- Side kick, a martial arts move
