= The Removed =

- Directed by: David McElroy
- Written by: David McElroy; Marc Menet
- Produced by: Timothy Christian; Marc Menet; David McElroy
- Starring: Daniel Baldwin; Tuckie White; Alja Jackson
- Cinematography: Johnny Derango
- Edited by: Laura Madalinski; David McElroy
- Music by: Dave Holden
- Production companies: Methodical Productions iSoar Films
- Release date: March 26, 2011 (Gasparilla Film Festival)
- Running time: 95 minutes
- Country: United States
- Language: English

The Removed - later retitled AFTER EFFECT - is a 2013 psychological thriller film directed by David McElroy and starring Daniel Baldwin, Tuckie White, and singer Alja Jackson.

== Plot summary ==
When college student Lacie finds out her tuition fee is being raised she worries about making ends meet and voices her concerns to her friend Killian who suggests she try clinical trials. Killian explains he has done one before and it was easy money. He takes Lacie to a campus noticeboard, finds a flyer which gives Lacie a number to call and she calls to makes enquiries. Strangely, as soon as she leaves her number she receives a call back immediately asking her to come for an interview tomorrow.

Lacie attends the interview with Dr. Detrick and although he makes her feel uncomfortable, when she is told the pay for one week of trials is $1000 she immediately signs up and the very next day arrives at a facility. Upon arrival she is searched for electronic devices and warned that phones and computers are banned for the duration by a nurse named Daphne, who tells Lacie to quickly change into scrubs and meet the other test subjects in the dining room.

Lacie then meets her company for the next week - who all have different reasons for being there. Jake is the clown of the group who explains he has done several of these trials just for easy cash, he is joined by Carter, another man who has been involved in numerous trials but this time is joined by his fiancée Amanda. Next are Ty, Keisha and shy Riley who explains she is only doing the trial to annoy her strict parents. The group then meet the trial director Sanders who explains the trial is of great importance and they are doing their country a great service. Jake laughs at this and says he just wants the money, much to Sander's chagrin.

Later the group bond over dinner and everyone explains their reasons for being there. Including Lacie who wants to visit her mom at home, Jake who wants a TV and Carter and Amanda who want to elope to Las Vagas to get married. Keisha voices her disapproval at their reasons and tells them that she was let go from her job and this trial is more a necessity and she wonders why people would risk their health for trivial things like TV's.

The same night, the group are called in one by one for the trials and once in a small room a gas is pumped in, this makes Lacie sick and she passes out. Later Amanda awakes and goes to Carter's room and they engage in rough sex, during which as Carter pulls her hair a large chunk pulls away from Amanda's head. She runs off to the bathroom where she begins to feel sick, her hair falls out and her face begins to swell. She calls for Carter and after he finds a bloody mess in the bathroom, she pounces on him and he is heard screaming as the door rattles.

Lacie later wakes up and wanders the facility and finds Killian also looking for staff members although he seems less concerned. They gather everyone together and Lacie explains the doors are all locked and the staff have disappeared. Only Keisha believes something is wrong and the group split up to search for Carter and Amanda who are missing.

The group of Lacie, Killian and Jake quickly find Carter in the bathroom bitten and bloodied up but snarling like an animal - they rush to find Keisha, Ty and Riley and they go to Keisha's room to get a phone she snuck in but a bloody Amanda finds and attacks them. The group run and Killian locks Keisha out of the room leaving her to die as Amanda rips her apart, much to Ty's fury.

It is then revealed Sanders, Dr. Detrick and a tech guy are watching through CCTV and the gas is actually a chemical weapon being tested on behalf of Senator Davis.

The surviving group are trapped in the dining area, where Ty begins to show signs of infection. Riley bravely goes into the hall to retrieve Keisha's phone but is almost killed by Amanda as she does, but the phone is broken. The group then decide to make a break for the rec room and climb into the air ducts to reach the roof but Ty vomits up blood and attacks. As the group run from Ty, Amanda attacks Killian and rips out his throat killing him. Ty in turn grabs Amanda and viciously snaps her neck.

In the rec room Lacie climbs into the air duct closely followed by Riley only for Ty to attack Jake and they begin to fight. Ty gains the upper hand and strangles Jake but Riley saves him by striking Ty in the head before he pushes her away, allowing Jake to kill Ty, only for it to be revealed that Jake has turned, he viciously stabs Riley to death and follows Lacie to the roof. Soon a team of soldiers arrive to clean up, Lacie believes she is safe but suddenly turns and attacks and is killed.

Senator Davis and Sanders are shown to be very happy with the trial and its results explaining the chemical can be used against enemies to make them aggressive and turn on each other and is much better than their previous attempt that resulted in the AIDS epidemic.

The movie ends with the bodies all being incinerated and another flyer being hung up in Lacie's college dorm asking for test subjects.

== Cast ==
- Daniel Baldwin as Senator Davis
- Tuckie White as Lacie Donovan
- Matt Lucki as Killian Morgan
- Jake Hames as Jake
- Alja Jackson as Keisha Jackson
- Kristina Geddes as Riley
- Zak Hawkins as Ty
- Lily Hex as Amanda
- Jeremy Kahn as Carter
