= Saving Israel =

Book by Boaz Dvir

- Author: Boaz Dvir
- Publisher: Rowman & Littlefield
- Publication date: January 31, 2020
- ISBN: 9780811737265

Saving Israel: The Unknown Story of Smuggling Weapons and Winning a Nation's Independence is a book by Boaz Dvir, published January 31, 2020 by Rowman & Littlefield. It tells the story of a secret and illegal operation by American aviators to save the Jewish state following World War II. The book is available in hardcover, digital, and audiobook formats.

== Synopsis ==
In 1948, newborn Israel lacked the weapons to defend itself against an invasion by five well-equipped neighboring armies that was impending. Al Schwimmer, an American World War II veteran who feared a repeat of the Holocaust created factitious airlines, bought decommissioned airplanes from the US War Assets Administration, fixed them in California and New Jersey, and sent his pilots (Jewish and non-Jewish WWII aviators) to pick up rifles, bullets, and fighter planes from the only country willing to break the international arms embargo: communist Czechoslovakia. Schwimmer and key members of his team paid a heavy price for helping supply Israel with the aircraft and weapons she needed to defend herself. They lost their civil rights. They were convicted of breaking the arms embargo and America's Neutrality Act. Years later, three presidents would pardon three of them. This book recreates the operation members’ journey in vivid scenes, capturing their multilayered stories and larger-than-life personalities. It documents the spirit as well as the facts of a mostly unknown mission to save a nascent-yet-ancient nation.

== Reviews ==
The book has been well received with reviews from various outlets, including the Washington Times, the Jerusalem Post, and the Times of Israel. Defense and Foreign affairs author Geogery R. Copley also reviewed the book saying “The book, written in a journalistic style, tells a tale which not only is educational about the formation of Israel and the age into which it was born, but about the role which innovation and creativity can play in the saving of any society during a period of existential crisis. It is about how people discover their identity—which is usually in times of crisis—and how they can act to preserve that identity to create anew.” Other reviewers include Thomas Van Hare (Historic Wings), Ralph Lowenstein (University of Florida College of Journalism), Miriam Elman (Syracuse University), Barbara Dury (former “60 Minutes” producer), and Richard Shyrock (Virginia Tech). An additional review was published by Lt. Col. Stephen S. Harvey in Army University Press.

Joshua Sinai from the Washington Times said: A fascinating and dramatic account filled with lots of new information about a crucially formative period in Israel's history. The author recreates in vivid detail how this overarching effort included the covert purchasing, fixing and maintenance of a variety of surplus aircraft, such as Messerschmitt fighters and B-17 bombers, as well as firearms, in the United States, and the recruitment, training, and deployment of the mostly American pilots to fly them on what turned out to be dangerous long-distance missions to Israel.

In September 2020, Saving Israel landed the No. 5 spot on Oklahoma's nonfiction bestsellers’ list.

== Review Quotes ==
"How American Jews and others smuggled vital military supplies to the Jewish community in Palestine and later the Jewish state has never been told in such rich detail. Never before have readers gotten such an inside look at some very feisty – but also courageous and noble – characters, who changed the course of history. In short, the author did some world-class reporting … it is the nitty-gritty of getting the job done and activities of the characters who risked their lives, not to mention their freedom and citizenships, that make this book unique." —Aaron Leibel, The Jerusalem Post

"This book is a must-have for anyone who loves aviation history. It is a masterwork of research, interviews, and first-hand accounts of what it was like at the very beginning of the IAF [Israeli Air Force], when nobody knew if Israel would live or die. This book deserves our highest rating—a Five-Star Review. Drop everything and get this book today, you can thank us later. —Thomas Van Hare, Historic Wings Based on extensive research, the book reads like a historical thriller. Veterans, whose efforts on Israel’s behalf are still unrecognized, come to life. The result is a tale of heroism against all odds, a story that must be told to fully understand Israel’s success in its War of Independence." —Ellis Shuman, The Times of Israel

"The American Jewish and Christian role in helping Israel win its War of Independence in 1948 is little known in the US or Israel. Saving Israel is a revelation." —Ralph Lowenstein, dean emeritus, University of Florida College of Journalism

"How did Israel come to rely on Nazi-surplus weapons during its war for independence in 1948? How did a fledgling state that didn’t yet have an air force manage to turn back a powerful Egyptian military column that was poised to march on Tel Aviv? In Saving Israel, Boaz Dvir answers these questions and more by recreating the relatively little-known story of a heroic band-of-brothers—a group of American WWII vets who risked their comfortable lives and freedom to answer a desperate call for help. Drawing on over two-dozen interviews, Dvir’s book brings this incredible chapter in Israel’s early history to life. What motivated these men to fly for Israel at a time when its survival hung in the balance? Saving Israel is a must read for anyone interested in military history and learning more about America’s war heroes." —Miriam F. Elman, associate professor of political science, Syracuse University

"With the world being turned on its head, the state of Israel faces some of its biggest challenges since its inception little more than a half century ago. To understand Israel's beginning, Boaz Dvir's beautifully written book, Saving Israel, offers a loving and unvarnished account of the men and women who risked everything to make sure Israel not only survived, but thrived. And it is a stark reminder of why Israel's survival and its place in the world is more important than ever". —Barbara Dury, former 60 Minutes producer

"Saving Israel reveals the little-known story of the creation of the air force that defended the state of Israel in its earliest days in 1948. Enriched by numerous first-hand accounts of the participants, Boaz Dvir presents a compelling and highly readable story of people willing to risk all in defense of an ideal." —Richard Shryock, associate professor, Department of Modern and Classical Languages & Literatures, Virginia Tech

== Events ==
Dvir has participated in a few book signings and many virtual discussions about his book. On June 18, 2020, the National Museum of American Jewish Military History in Washington, DC, held a virtual book talk with Dvir. Dvir discussed the book and then opened the floor to a Q&A. The Military Aviation Museum in Virginia Beach, Virginia, also hosted a Saving Israel webinar in August 2020.
