= William Baldwin =

American actor (born 1963)

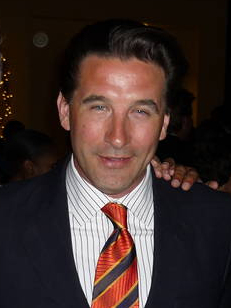
- Baldwin at the 2008 GLAAD Awards
- Born: William Baldwin; February 21, 1963 (age 63); Massapequa, New York, U.S.
- Other name: Billy Baldwin
- Education: Binghamton University
- Occupation: Actor
- Years active: 1989–present
- Political party: Independent
- Spouse: Chynna Phillips (m. 1995)
- Children: 3
- Relatives: John Phillips (father-in-law), Michelle Phillips (mother-in-law)
- Family: Baldwin

William Baldwin (born February 21, 1963) is an American actor and the third of the four Baldwin brothers. He has starred in the films Flatliners (1990), Backdraft (1991), Sliver (1993), Virus (1999), The Squid and the Whale (2005), Forgetting Sarah Marshall, in which he portrayed himself, and the Netflix show Northern Rescue (2019). Baldwin is married to singer Chynna Phillips.

== Early life ==
Baldwin was born in Massapequa, New York, the son of Carol Newcomb (née Martineau; December 15, 1929 – May 26, 2022), later founder of The Baldwin Fund, and Alexander Rae Baldwin Jr (October 26, 1927 – April 15, 1983). His father was a high school history/social studies teacher and football coach. He is the brother of actors Alec, Daniel, and Stephen, sometimes collectively known as the Baldwin brothers, and of sisters Beth and Jane, all together known as the Baldwin family. Baldwin was raised in a Catholic family, and has Irish and French ancestry. A graduate of Alfred G. Berner High School (in which one of his schoolmates was Rex Heuermann) and Binghamton University, where he was a varsity wrestler. He has a degree in political science.

== Career ==
=== 1980s ===
Before starting his acting career, Baldwin was a fashion model for Calvin Klein. His first starring role was in a TV movie as Robert Chambers, alongside Danny Aiello and Lara Flynn Boyle in The Preppie Murder, which aired on ABC in 1989. Baldwin also appeared in the 1989 film Born on the Fourth of July, starring Tom Cruise, where he had a minor role as a U.S. Marine during the Vietnam War. His brothers Daniel and Stephen also had minor parts in the film.

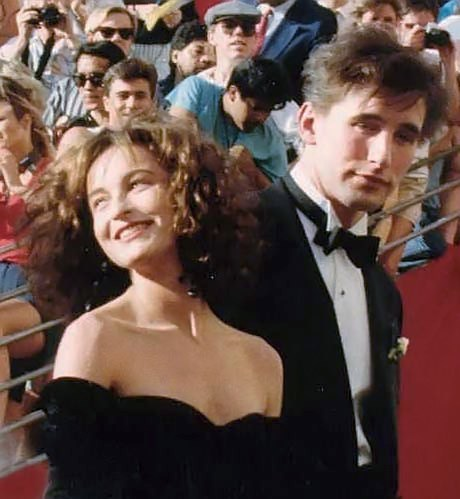
Baldwin with Jennifer Grey at the 1988 Academy Awards

=== 1990s ===
Baldwin's first featured film was Internal Affairs, in which he starred alongside Richard Gere and Andy García. He then starred in big-budget films such as Flatliners with stars such as Julia Roberts, Kiefer Sutherland and Kevin Bacon. He portrayed Chicago firefighter Brian McCaffrey in Backdraft with Kurt Russell and also with an ensemble cast including Donald Sutherland, Scott Glenn, Rebecca De Mornay, and Robert De Niro. His role in 1993 film Sliver along with Sharon Stone earned him the MTV Movie Award for Most Desirable Male.

In 1995, among other diverse characters he has played in his career, Baldwin was on Joel Schumacher's shortlist for Batman Forever to play the title character; Schumacher's four diverse choices were Daniel Day-Lewis, Ralph Fiennes, Val Kilmer and Baldwin. The role went to Val Kilmer. Baldwin starred alongside Cindy Crawford in Fair Game. Then in 1996, he starred in a low-budget film by Miramax Films titled Curdled and was paid US$150,000 for his performance, compared to the $1.7 million he received for his role in Sliver; his performance in the film was slightly acclaimed by critics. In 1998, he appeared in Warren Beatty's film Bulworth as Constance Bulworth's lover. In 1999, Baldwin teamed up with Jamie Lee Curtis and Donald Sutherland for the science fiction thriller Virus and played alongside Peter Gallagher in the Showtime original movie, Brotherhood of Murder.

=== 2000s ===
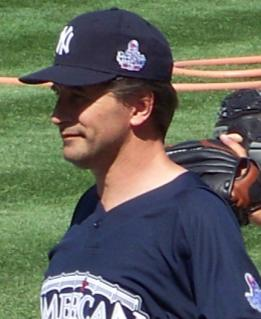
Baldwin in 2008

In 2001, Baldwin played a leading role in the television film Double Bang which aired on HBO. Since then, Baldwin has played in other projects such as Red Rover in 2003, Park, Feel and Lenexa, 1 Mile in 2006, and Adrift in Manhattan, A Plumm Summer, Noise, and Humble Pie in 2007. His 2004 film Art Heist received much attention when it was released on DVD. Baldwin has continued to act in films and on television, but has not taken many leading roles. He was well received in a supporting role in the 2005 film The Squid and the Whale alongside Laura Linney and Jeff Daniels, for which he earned the Gotham Independent Film Award for Best Ensemble Cast. He also co-starred in ABC's Dirty Sexy Money as Donald Sutherland's oldest son, Patrick Darling IV, for the duration of the show until April 2009. In 2008, he appeared in the comedy film Forgetting Sarah Marshall, which stars Jason Segel and Kristen Bell, as Detective Hunter Rush.

=== 2010s ===
In February 2010, Baldwin played Batman in Justice League: Crisis on Two Earths, a loose adaptation of Grant Morrison's JLA: Earth 2 story. Baldwin portrayed Dr. Willam van der Woodsen, father of Serena and Eric van der Woodsen, on the third and fourth seasons of Gossip Girl. Baldwin was also featured with his brother Daniel in UniGlobe Entertainment's breast cancer docudrama, 1 a Minute. The documentary was made by Namrata Singh Gujral, and features breast cancer survivors Olivia Newton-John, Diahann Carroll, Melissa Etheridge, Namrata Singh Gujral, Mumtaz, Jaclyn Smith, Daniel Baldwin and Priya Dutt. Baldwin was cast in the second season of Parenthood, which aired Fall 2010. He played Gordon Flint: a charismatic bachelor, the boss of Adam Braverman (Peter Krause) and a love-interest for Adam's sister, Sarah (Lauren Graham). In 2011, Baldwin starred in the Lifetime Original Movie, The Craigslist Killer which aired January 3, 2011. He played the lead detective on the case of the killer, Philip Markoff, who connected with victims through Craigslist ads placed in Boston, Massachusetts.

On June 1, 2011, Baldwin starred in the indie film Sexy Evil Genius, alongside Seth Green, Harold Perrineau Jr., Katee Sackhoff and Michelle Trachtenberg. The film was directed by Shawn Piller. In July 2011, Baldwin joined the CBS drama Hawaii Five-0 for a multi-episode arc. On March 22, 2012, Baldwin guest starred on the NBC show 30 Rock. Baldwin plays Lance Drake Mandrell, an actor who plays Jack Donaghy – the role played in the series by Baldwin's real-life brother Alec – in a made-for-TV movie within the show. Baldwin is currently a model for Sacoor Brothers. Baldwin appeared in the fourth and final season of Wilfred, replacing Dwight Yoakam in the role of Bruce. In 2015, he narrated for the documentary A Wing and a Prayer, a film about American fighter pilots who assisted in the 1948 Arab–Israeli War and the founding of the Israeli Air Force.

In 2016, Baldwin signed on for a recurring role on the 2016 reboot of the television series MacGyver as Elwood Davis, Riley's estranged father on CBS Television Studios. On November 21, 2017, Baldwin joined the main cast on a television series along with Miles Teller in Too Old to Die Young which was released in the summer of 2019 on Amazon Video. Baldwin starred and executive produced Northern Rescue, a Canadian drama television series produced by CBC Television distributed internationally on Netflix. The first season of 10 episodes debuted on March 1, 2019.

=== 2020s ===
In 2021, Baldwin starred in War of the Worlds: Annihilation. Baldwin appeared in the horror film Candyland. In 2024, he narrated the documentary Americans with No Address, a film that explores the causes of the homeless crisis in the United States. The documentary serves as a companion piece to the upcoming narrative feature film No Address, which aims to raise awareness about homelessness.

== Personal life ==
In 1995, Baldwin married singer Chynna Phillips of the music group Wilson Phillips, daughter of musician John Phillips and Michelle Gilliam. Together, they have three children, daughters Jameson (b. 2000) and Brooke (b. 2004) and son Vance (b. 2001). Baldwin's brother Alec Baldwin and Michelle Phillips both starred on the CBS primetime soap Knots Landing.

In October 2019, Baldwin revealed that his son Vance had been diagnosed with cancer the year prior and was now in remission.

Baldwin splits his time between an estate in Santa Barbara, California, and another in Bedford Corners, New York, which is 30 minutes away from his brother Stephen's estate in Nyack, New York.

Along with his brother Alec, Baldwin supports left-leaning issues which has strained relations with the conservative views of his brother Stephen.

== Filmography ==
=== Film ===
Year	Title	Role	Notes
1989	The Preppie Murder	Robert Chambers	TV movie
1989	Born on the Fourth of July	Platoon	
1990	Internal Affairs	Officer Van Stretch	
1990	Flatliners	Joe Hurley	
1991	Backdraft	Brian McCaffrey	
1993	Three of Hearts	Joe Casella	
1993	Sliver	Zeke Hawkins	
1995	A Pyromaniac's Love Story	Garett	
1995	Fair Game	Detective Max Kirkpatrick	
1996	Curdled	Paul Guell	
1998	Bulworth	Constance Bulworth's Lover	
1998	Shattered Image	Brian	
1999	Virus	Steve Baker	
1999	Brotherhood of Murder	Tom Martinez	TV movie
2000	Primary Suspect	Christian Box	
2000	Relative Values	Don Lucas	
2001	Double Bang	Billy Brennan	
2001	One Eyed King	Frankie Thomas	
2001	Say Nothing	Julian Grant	
2002	You Stupid Man	Brady	
2003	Red Rover	Will Taylor	
2004	Art Heist	Bruce Walker	
2005	The Squid and the Whale	Ivan	
2006	Lenexa, 1 Mile	Dan Cooney Sr.	
2006	Park	Dennis	
2006	Feel	Nathan	
2007	Adrift in Manhattan	Mark Phipps	
2007	American Fork	Truman Hope	
2007	A Plumm Summer	Mick Plumm	
2007	Noise	Mayor's Chief of Staff	
2008	Forgetting Sarah Marshall	Detective Hunter Rush	
2010	Justice League: Crisis on Two Earths	Batman (voice)	Video
2010	1 a Minute	Himself	
2011	The Craigslist Killer	Detective Bennett	TV movie
2011	Jock the Hero Dog	Boatman (voice)	
2012	Dino Time	Sarco (voice)	
2013	Be My Valentine	Dan	TV movie
2013	Sexy Evil Genius	Bert Mayfaire	Video
2013	Stranger Within	Robert Moore	Video
2014	The Wisdom to Know the Difference	Dennis	
2014	Aftermath	Shane (voice)	
2015	Lead With Your Heart	Ben Walker	TV movie
2015	Christmas Trade	Mitch Taylor	
2016	Chronology	Mr. Rose	
2016	Blowtorch	Detective Frank Hogan	
2017	While You Were Dating	Nick Stendahl	TV movie
2017	Born Again Dead	Haskell	
2017	The Broken Key	Friar Hugo	
2017	Maximum Impact	Man in Shadows	
2018	Abigail Falls	Peter	
2018	Minutes to Midnight	Mr. Walters	
2019	1st Born	Saul	
2019	Welcome to Acapulco	Drake Savage	
2019	Backdraft 2	Brian McCaffrey	Video
2019	Talk	Elvis	Short
2020	2 Graves in the Desert	Mario	
2020	Beckman	Reese	
2020	S.O.S. Survive or Sacrifice	Jake	
2021	Church People	Mr. Cameron	
2021	The Rebels of PT-218	General Bradley	
2021	Fourth Grade	Charlie	
2021	Haters	Himself	
2021	War of the Worlds: Annihilation	General Skuller	
2022	Dakota	Monty Sanders	
2022	Candy Land	Sheriff Rex	
2022	Super Volcano	Senator Carlson	TV movie
2022	The Good Witch of Christmas	Tony	
2022	A Royal Christmas on Ice	Daryl Blake	TV movie
2022	The Case of the Christmas Diamond	Detective Billings	TV movie
2022	20.0 Megaquake	Senator Carlson	TV movie
2023	Ice Storm	Senator Carlson	TV movie
2023	Assault on Hill 400	General Weaver	
2023	Billie's Magic World	Gregory	
2023	Break In	Robert Lockwood	
2023	A Royal Christmas Holiday	Jerrod	TV movie
2023	Out of Hand	Leonard	
2024	South of Hope Street	Lt. Daniel Winthrop	
2024	War of the Worlds: Extinction	General Skuller	
2025	No Address	Robert	

=== Television ===
Year	Title	Role	Notes
2004–2006	Danny Phantom	Johnny 13 (voice)	Recurring cast: Season 1, Guest: Season 2-3
2006	Waterfront	Paul Brennan	Main cast
2007–2009	Dirty Sexy Money	Patrick Darling	Main cast
2010	Parenthood	Gordon Flint	Recurring cast: Season 2
2010–2012	Gossip Girl	William Van Der Woodsen	Recurring cast: Season 3-6
2011–2012	Hawaii Five-0	Frank Delano	Recurring cast: Season 2, Guest: Season 3
2012	30 Rock	Lance Drake Mandrell	Episode: "Kidnapped by Danger"
2012	Men at Work	Shepard Peters	Episode: "Inventing Milo"
2013	Copper	William 'Wild Bill' Eustace	Recurring cast: Season 2
2014	Wilfred	Bruce	Episode: "Patterns"
2015	Forever	Oliver Clausten	Episode: "The Wolves of Deep Brooklyn"
2015	Hot in Cleveland	Dane Stevens	Recurring cast: Season 6
2016	Hit the Floor	Jackson Everett	Recurring cast: Season 3
2017–2019	MacGyver	Elwood Davis	Recurring cast: Season 2, Guest: Season 3
2018	Insatiable	Gordy Greer	Episode: "Banana Heart Banana"
2018	The Purge	David Ryker	Recurring cast: Season 1
2018	Dream Corp, LLC	Dad	Episode: "Can't Touch This"
2019	Northern Rescue	John West	Main Cast
2019	Too Old to Die Young	Theo	Recurring cast
2023	South Wind	Warren	Main cast
TBA	The Best of Us		

=== Documentary ===
Year	Title	Role
2015	A Wing and a Prayer	Narrator
2024	Americans with No Address	Narrator

== Awards and nominations ==
Year	Awards	Category	Recipient	Outcome
1993	MTV Movie Awards	MTV Movie Award for Most Desirable Male	Sliver	Won
1993	Golden Raspberry Awards	Golden Raspberry Award for Worst Actor	Sliver	Nominated
1995	Golden Raspberry Awards	Golden Raspberry Award for Worst Screen Couple (shared with Cindy Crawford)	Fair Game	Nominated
2005	Gotham Independent Film Awards	Gotham Independent Film Award for Best Ensemble Cast	The Squid and the Whale	Won
