= Americanizing Shelley =

- Promotional film poster
- Directed by: Lorraine Senna
- Written by: Namrata Singh Gujral
- Produced by: UniGlobe Entertainment
- Starring: Namrata Singh Gujral; Beau Bridges; Wil Wheaton; Noureen DeWulf; RonReaco Lee; Phillip Rhys
- Cinematography: Christo Bakalov
- Edited by: Troy Takaki
- Music by: Jay Ferguson
- Production company: UniGlobe Entertainment
- Distributed by: UniGlobe Entertainment
- Release date: April 26, 2007 (Nashville)
- Running time: 90 minutes
- Country: United States
- Language: English

Americanizing Shelley is a 2007 Hollywood romantic comedy film directed by Lorraine Senna and starring Beau Bridges, Namrata Singh Gujral, Shaheen Khan, Wil Wheaton, Noureen DeWulf, Tony Yalda, and Ajay Mehta. The film was the closing film of the 2007 Nashville Film Festival.

== Premise ==
Gujral stars as Shalini Singh/Shelley, an Indian woman who comes to the United States from a Himalayan village to find her fiance and crosses paths with a movie producer who tries to "Americanize" her in order to make her a star.

== Music ==
The song, Dancin' In The Clouds, was cut as a collaboration between country star Steve Azar and Namrata Singh Gujral for the film. The single is a "country rock-meets-"Bollywood" style duet, which made Azar and Gujral the first artists to place an Eastern language (Hindi) in country music. It also made Gujral the first Eastern artist ever to make air on CMT. Hollywood composer Jay Ferguson of Spirit and Jo Jo Gunne fame produced the single.
