= Jessie's Dad =

- Promotional poster for the film
- Directed by: Boaz Dvir
- Written by: Boaz Dvir
- Release date: June 16, 2011
- Running time: 50 minutes
- Country: United States
- Language: English
- Budget: $19,000

Jessie's Dad is a 2011 documentary film by Boaz Dvir. The film tells the story of Mark Lunsford, and his transformation from an uneducated truck driver to an activist after the murder of his daughter Jessica by a convicted sex offender. As of June 2016, the film is currently on Hulu, available to the public.

== Background ==
Before his daughter's murder, the tattooed, long-haired Harley rider drove a dump truck, lived with his church-going parents and spent most of his free time with his daughter. Jessie, as everyone in the small West Florida town of Homosassa called her, loved going to karaoke nights with her dad and playing outside in their mobile-home neighborhood. On February 24, 2005, John Couey broke into Jessie's bedroom and took her across the street to his trailer. He raped her, buried her alive, smothering her.

After his daughter's body was discovered, Lunsford embarked on a journey to pass Jessica's Law around the country. It toughens penalties against sex offenders. So far, Lunsford has convinced 46 states to pass it.

== The film ==
The hour-long documentary follows Lunsford as he visits Capitol Hill and state capitols to urge lawmakers to increase penalties for persons convicted of offenses against children. The film offers a behind-the-scenes look at a single father haunted by the knowledge that a sex offender held his daughter within earshot for three days.

Jessie's Dad was initially funded by a Carole Fielding Production Grant, along with a University of Florida research grant. Mark Lunsford, his parents and several other members of his family attended the 2008 screening of Jessie's Dad at the University of Florida. Lunsford and the film received two standing ovations from a packed theater. Green Apple Entertainment is distributing Jessie's Dad, which is available from iTunes and Amazon, where it has received an average rating of 5 (the highest possible). Lifetime and Investigation Discovery have used a substantial amount of Jessie's Dad footage in their programs. The film has screened in several film festivals, where it has won top prizes, and prestigious venues, including Columbia University's satellite campus in Paris.

Dvir reflected on the film years later in an article in the Centre Daily Times: "As a documentary filmmaker, I change my mind about societal issues related to my projects much like kids experience growth — I only notice it months, sometimes years, later. Directing and producing "Jessie's Dad" [...] altered my point of view on mandatory sentencing."

== Awards ==
- Best Documentary at the 2011 ITN Distribution Film and New Media Festival
- Best Florida Film at the 2011 Fort Lauderdale International Film Festival
- Direct Cinema Outstanding Documentary Award
- CINE Special Jury Award
- Finalist for the International Documentary Association's David L. Wolper Award
- Carole Fielding Production Grant
