= Lorraine Senna =

American film and television director

- Other names: Lorraine Senna Ferrara; Lorraine S. Ferrara; Lorraine Senna Ferrera
- Occupations: Film director, television director
- Years active: 1978–2007

Lorraine Senna (sometimes credited as Lorraine Senna Ferrara) is an American film and television director.

== Career ==
As a television director, her credits include Dynasty, Emerald Point N.A.S., Trapper John, M.D., Fame, Falcon Crest, Homefront, Dr. Quinn, Medicine Woman, Babylon 5, Northern Exposure, Lois & Clark: The New Adventures of Superman, Picket Fences and The Sopranos. She is the only woman who ever directed any episode of The Sopranos. From 1978 to 1982, she was an assistant director on a few television films and the series Knots Landing, making her head directorial debut on that series.

From 1996 to 2005, she directed a number of television films, beginning with Our Son, the Matchmaker. In 2006, she released her first theatrical film Paradise, Texas. The following year, she released the film Americanizing Shelley, her last credit to date.
