= The Beach Party at the Threshold of Hell =

- Directed by: Kevin Wheatley; Jonny Gillette
- Written by: Kevin Wheatley
- Produced by: Scott Wheatley; Cameron Pearce; Jamie Bullock; Ryan Turi
- Starring: Kevin Wheatley; Bill English; Chandler Parker; Ted Schneider; Jamie Bullock; Alex Reznick; Paul Whitty; Stewart Carrico; Lea Coco; Daniel Baldwin; Richard Riehle; Jane Seymour; Tony Hale
- Cinematography: Cameron Pearce
- Edited by: Cameron Pearce
- Music by: Russ Howard III
- Release date: January 23, 2006 (LAFF)
- Language: English

The Beach Party at the Threshold of Hell is a 2006 American science fiction comedy film directed by Jonny Gillette, written and co-directed by Kevin Wheatley, and produced by Jamie Bullock and Ryan Turi. It stars Wheatley and Bullock, amongst others.

== Plot ==
The film is set in New America in the year 2097, two decades after a nuclear apocalypse. Tex Kennedy, the last survivor of the Kennedy family, two robotic ex-secret service agents, and a female cannibal journey to find the "Threshold of Hell" to gain access to a radio tower to unite the survivors of the apocalypse.

== Production and release ==
The movie premiered at the Los Angeles Film Festival on June 23, 2006, and then toured the country screening at various film festivals. The movie was picked up by National Lampoon for a theatrical release in October 2007.

== Critical reaction ==
Rotten Tomatoes records an aggregate rating of 67% from six reviews. The Village Voice found it "self-impressed film", and considered it an over-deliberate attempt to create a cult film, which failed, "funnier on paper than in reality", making a negative comparison to the Mad Max franchise.

== Cast ==
- Kevin Wheatley as Tex Kennedy
- Paul Whitty as Quincy the Robot
- Chandler Parker as Yul the Robot
- Jamie Bullock as Cannibal Sue
- Bill English as Benjamin Remington
- Stewart Carrico as Zach/Thorn
- Lea Coco as Vincent "Jackle" Remington
- Alex Reznik as Yurik Schlatz (not his real name)
- Ted Schneider as Marcellus St. Joan
- Daniel Baldwin as Clark Remington
- Morgan Carson as Ginsberg
- Scott Addison Clay as Blowgun Child
- Katherine Cunningham-Eves as Veronica
- Henry Dittman as Sue Biographer
- Katherine Flynn as Allison
- Tony Hale as Remington Biographer
- Callam Ingram as TV Son
- Claire Lautier as TV Mom
- J. P. Manoux as Sitcom Dad
- Alcorn Minor as Xavier
- Richard Riehle as Paranormal Historian
- Jim Ryan as Henry Edison
- Jane Seymour as President Lauren Coffey
- Ryan Turi as Richie
- Andrew Walker as Franklin
- Henry Vick as The Grashtowners
