= Kaante =

2002 Indian film by Sanjay Gupta

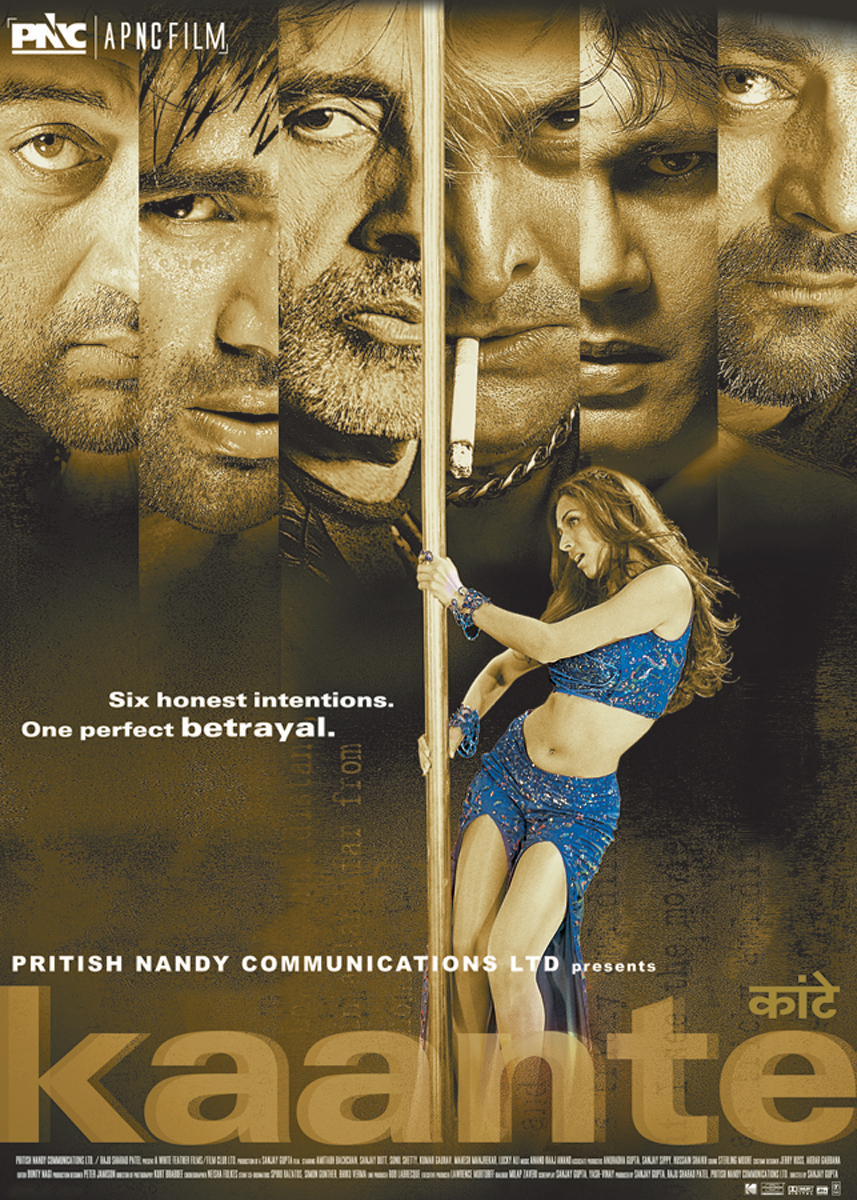
- Theatrical release poster
- Directed by: Sanjay Gupta
- Screenplay by: Sanjay Gupta; Yash-Vinay
- Dialogues by: Milap Zaveri; Rahul Singh
- Produced by: Sanjay Gupta; Lawrence Mortorff; Pritish Nandy; Raju Patel
- Starring: Amitabh Bachchan; Sanjay Dutt; Suniel Shetty; Mahesh Manjrekar; Lucky Ali; Kumar Gaurav
- Narrated by: Lucky Ali
- Cinematography: Kurt Brabbee
- Edited by: Bunty Nagi
- Music by: Anand Raj Anand; Vishal–Shekhar; Lucky Ali; Gregor Narholz
- Production companies: White Feather Films; Pritish Nandy Communications; Film Club
- Distributed by: Bollywood Pictures
- Release date: 20 December 2002
- Running time: 145 minutes
- Country: India
- Language: Hindi
- Budget: ₹30 crore
- Box office: ₹42.96 crore

Kaante (lit. 'Thorns') is a 2002 Indian Hindi-language heist action-thriller film co-written and directed by Sanjay Gupta. The film stars an ensemble cast of Amitabh Bachchan, Sanjay Dutt, Sunil Shetty, Lucky Ali, Mahesh Manjrekar, Kumar Gaurav, Namrata Singh Gujral, Rati Agnihotri, Rohit Roy, Isha Koppikar and Malaika Arora

Set in Los Angeles, the film follows six Indian men detained without evidence by the police, teaming up to plot a bank heist that would leave the Los Angeles Police Department penniless, while they start suspecting each other's identities, resulting in violence and chaos.

Kaante was heavily inspired by Quentin Tarantino's Reservoir Dogs (1992) as well as the film that inspired it, Ringo Lam's City on Fire (1987). According to Tarantino, Kaante is his favorite among the many films that were heavily inspired by his work.

Kaante was released theatrically on 20 December 2002. The film was a success at the box office despite clashing with Saathiya, another box office success, with first-week earnings of £1.8 million in India, nearly $1 million in the United States, and £268,507 in Britain. The film's final worldwide gross was ₹430 million.

== Plot ==
In Los Angeles, six men of Indian origin with a criminal record are detained by the police and interrogated about stealing a truck full of laptops and its whereabouts. Their deep antipathy towards the police for arresting them without any evidence, just because the witnesses had seen an Indian at the crime scene, grows into a daring plot. Sparked off by Jay "Ajju" Trehan and seconded by Yashvardhan "Major" Rampal, they all hatch a plan to rob the American Services Bank, in which lies the funding for the Los Angeles Police Department.

Marc Issak is a bouncer with a girlfriend working as a club dancer. Major has no stable job and lives with his sick wife. Andy is a software engineer having divorce and child custody problems, and is also jobless. Bali is a drug peddler who lives off the street; he has a mentally disabled sister in the asylum. Bali meets Mak one day, being chased by some drug dealers in an alley, who agrees to save him only if he splits his loot. They begin to work thereafter.

After the six are released from jail a day later, they meet up again to discuss the bank robbery. It is revealed Ajju had stolen the truck and sold it, and he gives everyone a share for the trouble they went through. Andy walks away with his, but when his lawyer tells him that the money is insufficient, he returns to the gang. On a hotel rooftop, they start planning the robbery, in which they familiarize themselves with the bank and get cars, weapons, and gadgets to do this. Soon they establish their hideout in a warehouse, where Major reveals that the bank will be looted the next day instead of the day after as previously planned, to thwart anyone's hidden agendas.

The robbery proceeds as planned, but they find a SWAT team waiting for them outside the bank. A gunfight ensues, and Mak is hit by a bullet while saving Major. The gang escape and meet at their hideout. Ajju reveals that he has kidnapped the police chief Det. MacQuarrie. They interrogate him and learn that one of them is an undercover cop. This strikes suspicion among them, yet they decide to bring the stolen amount to their hideout to divide the spoils. Back home Major learns that his wife has died. Ajju befriends Marc and both go to the club, where Marc take away his girlfriend from the club owner Cyrus, and it is then revealed that Ajju actually knows some English but was pretending not to all this while. When everyone returns, they find Bali dead, shot by Mak for his inhuman interrogation of MacQuarrie. Ajju them shoots Macquarie, and he reasons with the others that Mak is the undercover cop, but Major disagrees because he believes Mak saved him during the gunfight at the bank, and orders Ajju at gunpoint not to shoot Mak. Marc backs up Ajju and points his gun at Major and Mak, while Mak points his gun at Marc. The remaining four arrive at a Mexican standoff, as Andy retreats and scampers with the money. The four of them shoot each other, after which Major apologizes to Mak for not being able to save him. In reply, Mak says he was just doing his duty as he is the undercover cop, sent by the police to watch the team and that he was the one who buzzed the cops at the bank to arrive. Major shoots the already dying Mak in the head.

The film ends with Mak's voice narrating the story, as the bodies lie dead, stating they will all meet in hell soon, and he will have no explanation for his betrayal, as Marc's girlfriend is shown waiting for him in the aircraft, Bali's sister in the asylum, Andy's wife and son living happily with the step-father, and Andy driving off the highway pursued by a police helicopter, leaving Andy's fate to the discretion of the audience.

== Cast ==
- Amitabh Bachchan as Yashvardhan "Major" Rampal
- Sanjay Dutt as Jai "Ajju" Trehan
- Suniel Shetty as Marc Issac
- Mahesh Manjrekar as Raja "Bali" Yadav
- Lucky Ali as Maqbool "Mak" Haider
- Kumar Gaurav as Anand "Andy" Mathur
- Namrata Singh Gujral as Renu Mathur
- Malaika Arora as Lisa, Marc's girlfriend
- Rati Agnihotri as Major's wife
- Gulshan Grover as Cyrus
- Ranjit Chowdhry as Detective Constable
- Isha Koppikar as dancer in the song "Ishq Samundar" (special appearance)
- Rohit Roy as dancer in the song "Ishq Samundar" (special appearance)

== Production ==
The film was to star Sanjay Dutt, Sunil Shetty, Mahesh Manjrekar, Kumar Gaurav, Akshaye Khanna, Shilpa Shetty and Lisa Ray initially. Akshaye Khanna opted out and was replaced by Lucky Ali, Malaika Arora stepped into Lisa Ray's shoes and Namrata Singh Gujral was cast opposite Kumar Gaurav in lieu of Shilpa Shetty. Sunny Deol was offered Kumar Gaurav's role at one point. Isha Koppikar was signed for a full-fledged role opposite Sanjay Dutt which got relegated to just the song "Ishq Samandar" because of length concerns. Rohit Roy (from Shootout at Lokhandwala and a popular television actor) also makes an appearance in the song.

The film was the first Bollywood film to be completely shot in Los Angeles. The film's production team used Hollywood technicians. The filming was completed in 35 days. Namrata Singh Gujral was the only role cast in Hollywood from the principal cast. All other principals including Amitabh Bachchan were flown in from Mumbai for the Hollywood shoot.

== Reception ==
On the review aggregator website Rotten Tomatoes, 83% of 6 critics' reviews are positive, with an average rating of 6.4/10. Taran Adarsh of Bollywood Hungama gave the film three and a half stars out of five and stated, "Kaante takes a step forward in terms of content and technique. An apt example of progressive cinema that breaks the shackles of stereotype, the film has everything to woo the cinegoer: an impressive cast, grandiose look, an excellent second half, well executed stunts, popular music and eroticism in plenty". Prem Panicker of Rediff criticized the film saying "A more taut script, a little less of indulgence in directing, a tad more ruthlessness in editing, and this film could have pulled off a badly needed box office heist." A reviewer at Sify awarded the film three and a half stars out of five and wrote, "A film far ahead of its time in terms of execution, Kaante is a visual delight. And combined with good performances and superb action, it's a must-see this season."

Derek Elley of Variety praised the direction and performances of the lead cast, saying, "From the protags' initial meeting, heavy on closeups, Gupta directs the film primarily as a character piece, with Bachchan, Dutt and semi-comic relief Manjrekar driving the drama with richly characterized roles. Shetty, a tightly wound actor at the best of times, strikes few sparks as the nightclub bouncer, and his scenes with Arora as the chanteuse are flat." Dave Kehr of The New York Times reviewed the film writing, "A delirious Bollywood reimagining of Reservoir Dogs, complete with musical numbers, Sanjay Gupta's Kaante shifts as fluidly between cinematic idioms as it does between Hindi and English." Kevin Thomas of the Los Angeles Times said, "there is a steadfast earnestness in director Sanjay Gupta's deluded attempt to equal or even better Hollywood on its own ground that is rather touching -- but not to the degree that it sustains the film's many tedious stretches."

Quentin Tarantino cited Kaante as his favourite among the many films that were heavily inspired by his work. He praised the film's character-building for going beyond what he was able to do with Reservoir Dogs. Tarantino stated: "Here I am, watching a film that I've directed and then it goes into each character's background. And I'm like, 'Whoa'. For, I always write backgrounds and stuff, and it always gets chopped off during the edit. And so I was amazed on seeing this. I felt, this isn't Reservoir Dogs. But then it goes into the warehouse scene, and I am like, 'Wow, it's back to Reservoir Dogs'. Isn't it amazing!" He also praised Amitabh Bachchan's performance. Tarantino later screened Kaante at his New Beverly Cinema alongside Reservoir Dogs and City on Fire.

== Awards and nominations ==
=== 48th Filmfare Awards ===
==== Nominations ====
- Best Film – Pritish Nandy and Sanjay Gupta
- Best Director – Sanjay Gupta
- Best Actor – Amitabh Bachchan
- Best Supporting Actor – Sanjay Dutt
- Best Comedian – Mahesh Manjrekar
- Best Music Director – Anand Raaj Anand

== Soundtrack ==
Kaante

Soundtrack album by Anand Raj Anand Vishal–Shekhar
- Released: 28 June 2002
- Genre: Feature film soundtrack
- Language: Hindi
- Label: T-Series
- Director: Sanjay Gupta
- Producer: Pritish Nandy

The songs were mainly composed by Anand Raj Anand, while Vishal–Shekhar and Lucky Ali served as guest composers. The lyrics were penned by Dev Kohli and Vishal Dadlani. According to the Indian trade website Box Office India, with around 1,800,000 units sold, this film's soundtrack addalbum was the year's fourth highest-selling. Tracks like 'Maahi ve', 'Rama re' and 'Ishq Samundar' got good popularity. The soundtrack was #94 on the list of "100 Greatest Bollywood Soundtracks of All Time", as compiled by Planet Bollywood.

The song "Ishq Samundar", was re-made for the film Teraa Surroor (2016) which was sung by Himesh Reshammiya and Kanika Kapoor. The song "Maahi Ve" was recreated by Gourav-Roshin in the voice of Neha Kakkar for the film Wajah Tum Ho (2016).

=== Track listing ===
| No. | Title | Lyrics | Music | Singer(s) | Length |
|---|---|---|---|---|---|
| 1. | "Baby Baby" | Dev Kohli | Anand Raj Anand | Sunidhi Chauhan |
| 2. | "Chhod Na Re" | | Vishal–Shekhar | Udit Narayan, Sanjay Dutt, Sudesh Bhosle, Mahesh Manjrekar, KK, Vinod Rathod |
| 3. | "Dil Kya Kare" | | Anand Raj Anand | Kumar Sanu, Kavita Krishnamurthy |
| 4. | "Ishq Samundar" | Dev Kohli | Anand Raj Anand | Sunidhi Chauhan, Anand Raj Anand |
| 5. | "Maahi Ve" | Dev Kohli | Anand Raj Anand | Zubeen Garg, Sukhwinder Singh, Richa Sharma |
| 6. | "Maut" | | Lucky Ali | Lucky Ali |
| 7. | "Rama Re" | Dev Kohli | Anand Raj Anand | Zubeen Garg, Shaan, Sanjay Dutt |
| 8. | "Socha Nahin Tha" | | Anand Raj Anand | Shaan |
| 9. | "Yaar Maangiyasi" | | Anand Raj Anand | Sonu Nigam |
