= Citrus County Sheriff's Office =

Law enforcement agency in Florida, US

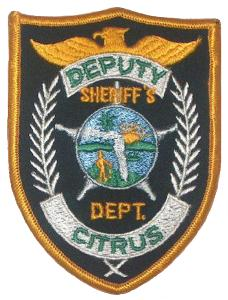
- Patch of the Citrus County Sheriff's Office
- Common name: Citrus County Sheriff's Office
- Abbreviation: CCSO

Agency overview
- Formed: June 2, 1887

Jurisdictional structure
- Operations jurisdiction: Florida
- Area: 773 sq mi
- Population: 162,500
- Legal jurisdiction: Citrus County
- Governing body: Sheriff
- General nature: Civilian police

Operational structure
- Headquarters: Inverness, Florida
- Agency executives: David Vincent, Sheriff; Thomas Bosco, Major; Bobby Lambert, Major

Website
- Citrus County Sheriff's Office

The Citrus County Sheriff's Office (CCSO) serves as the primary law enforcement agency for a population of 162,500 residents across 773.15 square miles (2,002.4 km2) in Citrus County, Florida.

== History ==
The sheriff's office commenced operations on June 2, 1887, coinciding with the establishment of Citrus County through the signature of the Governor. Edward A. Perry.

In 2005, the Citrus County Sheriff's Office made national headlines with its investigation of the gruesome rape and murder of Jessica Lunsford, a 9-year-old Homosassa girl.

== Organization ==
The current sheriff is David Vincent. The CCSO is divided into two bureaus:[1] [2]

=== Law Enforcement Bureau ===
The law enforcement bureau oversees the Law Enforcement Divisions of the department. Such as Patrol, Criminal Investigations, Judicial, Special Operations, and Training & Education.

=== Support Bureau ===
The Support Bureau oversees the department's Support Divisions. Such as Communications, Human Resources, Financial Services, Information Technology, and Staff Services.

In addition to the two bureaus, the department also has the Office of Community Engagement and Transparency, as well as Professional Standards.

The Office of Community Engagement and Transparency oversees the Public Information Officer, Senior Services, Volunteers, Strategic Planning, Community Engagement, and Emergency Management.

Professional Standards oversees Accreditation, Policies, Internal Affairs, CVSA, Risk Management, Records, Quality Assurance, and Public Records Requests.

== Rank Structure ==
Title	Insignia
Sheriff	
Major	
Captain	
Lieutenant	
Sergeant	
Corporal	
Master Deputy	
Deputy (FTO)	
Deputy	

All insignias except sergeant, corporal, master deputy and deputy (FTO) are worn on the shoulders of uniforms. The insignia for deputy (FTO) is one chevron with "FTO' below the chevron.

== Line of duty deaths ==
A total of four Citrus County Sheriff Office deputies have died while on the job:

- Corporal Marcial Rodriguez, End of Watch: Friday, October 24, 2025, Cause of Death: Cardiac Event
- Corporal Andres Julian "Andy" Lahera, End of Watch: Thursday, September 11, 2025, Cause of Death: Traumatic Brain Injury
- Master Detective Aubrey Fred Johnson, End of Watch: Tuesday, February 11, 1997, Cause of Death: Automobile Crash
- Deputy Sheriff James Mcintosh McMullen, End of Watch: Tuesday, December 26, 1899, Cause of Death: Gunfire

== See also ==
- List of U.S. state and local law enforcement agencies
- Sheriff (Florida)
