= 1 a Minute =

- Promotional film poster
- Directed by: Namrata Singh Gujral
- Written by: Namrata Singh Gujral
- Produced by: Nayomi Cooper
- Starring: Olivia Newton-John; Jaclyn Smith; Namrata Singh Gujral; Kelly McGillis; Melissa Etheridge; Bárbara Mori; Diahann Carroll; William Baldwin; Daniel Baldwin; Mumtaz; Priya Dutt; Lisa Ray; Deepak Chopra; Morgan Brittany
- Narrated by: Kelly McGillis
- Cinematography: Yasu Tanida
- Edited by: Namrata Singh Gujral; Maureen Meulen
- Music by: Jay Ferguson
- Production company: UniGlobe Entertainment
- Distributed by: Warner Bros.
- Release date: October 6, 2010
- Running time: 90 minutes
- Country: United States
- Language: English

1 a Minute is a 2010 American docudrama film written and directed by Indian American actress Namrata Singh Gujral. It is based on her own life and the lives of other women who suffered from cancer.

== Synopsis ==
The film is a hybrid between narrative structure and documentary style set to interweave throughout the film's plot. Based on the director's own experiences, the film follows the life of one woman and her struggle with breast cancer. The personal experiences of other celebrities who have dealt with breast cancer are interspersed throughout the film, as told by the celebrities themselves.

== Participants ==
Narrated by Kelly McGillis, the film includes interviews with Deepak Chopra, oncologist Dennis Slamon, and Ambassador Nancy Brinker, and features the participation of numerous celebrities who have themselves dealt either directly or indirectly with breast cancer. These include Olivia Newton-John, Namrata Singh Gujral, Jaclyn Smith, Melissa Etheridge, Bárbara Mori, Lisa Ray, Diahann Carroll, William Baldwin, Daniel Baldwin, Mumtaz, Jasmine Singh Cooper, and Priya Dutt.

== Background ==
The film focuses on breast cancer, and features female celebrities from around the world who are cancer survivors. Scheduled to kick off Breast Cancer Awareness Month, the film released on October 6, 2010, in 532 theaters in the US, where these theaters simulcast a live panel discussion featuring director Gujral, Melissa Etheridge, and Olivia Newton-John among others, immediately preceding the world premiere showing of the film. The film was released in Indian theaters on 29 October 2010 and was reported to be the largest release to that date for a cancer docudrama.

== Response ==
According to the Indo-Asian News Service, "[t]he documentary is an unprecedented push by global celebrity women, who are also cancer survivors, to help raise funds to find the cures, promote awareness and prevention as well as support survivors of women's cancers", with donations from the film set to support international Non-Profits & NGOs such as: The Carol M Baldwin Breast Cancer Research Fund and Nargis Dutt Memorial Cancer Foundation.
