= Harold Livingston =

American novelist and screenwriter (1924–2022)

- Born: September 4, 1924; Haverhill, Massachusetts, U.S.
- Died: April 28, 2022 (aged 97); Westlake Village, California, U.S.
- Occupations: Novelist; screenwriter

Harold Livingston (September 4, 1924 – April 28, 2022) was an American novelist and screenwriter who was best known as the credited screenwriter for Star Trek: The Motion Picture (1979). Others, including Alan Dean Foster and Gene Roddenberry, also contributed to the development of the story and script.

Before his career as a writer, Livingston was a radio operator for aircraft navigational purposes and wrote a book about his adventures titled No Trophy, No Sword. He was one of the founding members of the Israeli Air Force, and was instrumental in ensuring Israel's victory during the 1948 Arab–Israeli War.

Livingston died in Westlake Village, California, on April 28, 2022, at the age of 97.

== Credits ==
=== Filmography ===
- Blue Light episode "The Friendly Enemy" (television, 1966)
- The Feather and Father Gang episode "Two-Star Killer" (television, 1976)
- The Feather and Father Gang episode "For the Love of Sheila" (television, 1977)
- Star Trek: The Motion Picture (1979)
- A Wing and a Prayer (2015) [appearing as himself in this documentary]

=== Novels ===
- The Coasts of the Earth (1954)
- The Detroiters (1958)
- The Climacticon (1960)
- Ride a Tiger: A Novel (1987)
- Touch The Sky (1991)
- To Die in Babylon (1993)
- No Trophy, No Sword (1994)
