= Daniel Baldwin =

American actor (born 1960)

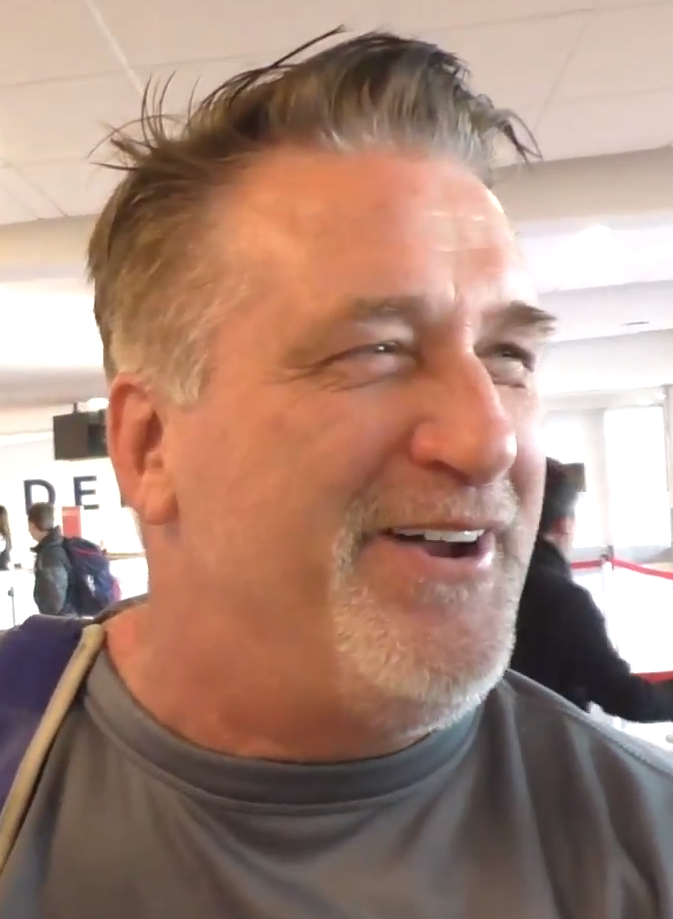
- Baldwin in 2016
- Born: Daniel Leroy Baldwin; October 5, 1960 (age 66); Massapequa, New York, U.S.
- Occupations: Actor, director
- Years active: 1988–present
- Spouses: Cheryl Baldwin (m. 1984; div. 1989); Elizabeth Baldwin (m. 1990; div. 1996) (Note: They separated in 1994 and finalized their divorce in 1996.); Joanne Smith (m. 2007; div. 2012); D'Asia Bellamy (m. 2022)
- Partners: Isabella Hofmann (1994–2005); Robin Hempel (2014–2020)
- Children: 6
- Family: Baldwin

Daniel Leroy Baldwin (born October 5, 1960) is an American actor and director. He is the second-oldest of the four Baldwin brothers, all of whom are actors. He is best known for playing the role of Detective Beau Felton in the NBC TV series Homicide: Life on the Street. He also starred in the films Harley Davidson and the Marlboro Man (1991), Hero (1992), Mulholland Falls, Trees Lounge (both 1996), Vampires, Phoenix (both 1998), Paparazzi (2004), Sidekick (2005), The Beach Party at the Threshold of Hell (2006), and Grey Gardens (2009).

He hosted The Daniel Baldwin Show on radio station WTLA in Syracuse from 2017 to 2019. He has also been an emcee for the television series World's Dumbest. In February 2009, he appeared on Celebrity Rehab with Dr. Drew, admitting to his struggle with cocaine addiction.

== Early life ==
Baldwin was born on October 5, 1960 in Massapequa, New York, on Long Island. the second son of Carol Newcomb (née Martineau; December 15, 1929 – May 26, 2022), a breast cancer survivor who founded the Carol M. Baldwin Breast Care Center of the University Hospital and Medical Center at Stony Brook, and Alexander Rae Baldwin Jr. (October 26, 1927 – April 15, 1983), a high school history/social studies teacher and football coach. Baldwin was raised in a Catholic family and has Irish and French ancestry. In addition to his three actor brothers, Alec (b. 1958), William (b. 1963), and Stephen (b. 1966), Baldwin has two sisters.

== Career ==
=== Acting ===
Baldwin's acting debut was in the television film Too Good to Be True in 1988, which he followed with roles in the films Born on the Fourth of July (1989), Harley Davidson and the Marlboro Man (1991) and Hero (1992). He returned to television in 1990 for the short-lived sitcom Sydney, which starred Valerie Bertinelli.

In 1993, Baldwin was cast in the Baltimore-based cop show Homicide: Life on the Street. Although he received good reviews, he left in 1995 after three seasons, and his character was later killed off. He returned to TV movies such as Attack of the 50 Ft. Woman, Family of Cops, and Twisted Desire, as well as the 1996 feature films Mulholland Falls and Trees Lounge.

In 1998, Baldwin was set to film the romantic comedy It Had to Be You, but was replaced by Michael Rispoli after being arrested for cocaine possession. John Carpenter's Vampires was released during his subsequent stint in rehab.

Baldwin was cast as Menelaus in the BBC One show Kings and Pharaohs for Series 1, featuring Christopher Eccleston, Michael Rooker and John Hurt.

Baldwin returned to appearances in various TV series episodes, including The Sopranos; and TV and direct-to-video movies, including reprising his role as Beau Felton in Homicide: The Movie in 2000. Baldwin then starred in TV movies such as Anonymous Rex (2004) and Our Fathers (2005) and small-budget films including Sidekick (2005) and Moola (2006).

In 2008, Baldwin signed on to play Julius Krug in the Award Winning HBO film based on the 1975 documentary Grey Gardens. That same year, he made appearances on truTV's The Smoking Gun Presents: World's Dumbest... as a frequent commentator. He also appeared as a supporting cast member in indie director Akihiro Kitamura's sophomore film, I'll Be There With You.

Baldwin was featured in UniGlobe Entertainment's breast cancer docu-drama titled 1 a Minute in 2010. The documentary was made by actress Namrata Singh Gujral and featured breast cancer survivors Olivia Newton-John, Diahann Carroll, Melissa Etheridge, Namrata Singh Gujral, Mumtaz and Jaclyn Smith, as well as Priya Dutt and Baldwin's brother William. The film also starred Bárbara Mori, Lisa Ray, Deepak Chopra and Morgan Brittany.

In 2014, Baldwin won Best Supporting Actor at the Madrid International Film Festival for his role in the award-winning feature film Helen Alone.

In 2024, Baldwin filmed The Caretaker, a film directed by Fady Jeanbart, which is scheduled for release in 2025. The movie stars Quinton Jackson, Robert Bronzi, and Avaryana Rose.

=== Reality television ===
In 2005, he was featured in VH1's Celebrity Fit Club, a reality show in which overweight celebrities compete to see who can shed the most weight. He was the team captain of the Eastsiders, which also featured rapper Biz Markie, plus-size model Mia Tyler, and actor Joe Gannascoli (later traded for Judge Mablean Ephriam from Divorce Court).

In 2008, Baldwin appeared on VH1's reality series Celebrity Rehab with Dr. Drew. In June 2009, he joined the cast of I'm a Celebrity...Get Me Out of Here!, with his brother Stephen; he was the second person voted off. He has made appearances in several seasons of truTV's The Smoking Gun Presents: World's Dumbest...

In 2014, Baldwin appeared on the first episode of Celebrity Wife Swap. His girlfriend swapped with the wife of Jermaine Jackson.

On August 27, 2015, Baldwin entered the Celebrity Big Brother (also known as Celebrity Big Brother: UK vs USA) house as a contestant representing the USA. On September 4, he was the first housemate evicted; he had lasted nine days.

== Personal life ==
=== Relationships and family ===
Baldwin had a daughter, filmmaker Kahlea (b. 1984), with his first wife, Cheryl. Baldwin and second wife Elizabeth had a daughter named Alexandra (b. 1994). Following the couple's divorce, Baldwin was involved in a lengthy relationship with his Homicide: Life on the Street co-star, Isabella Hofmann. They have a son, Atticus, (b. 1996), who is named after the lawyer in To Kill a Mockingbird, and has autism.

Baldwin next was married to Joanne Smith, a former British model, with whom he had daughter Avis Ann on January 17, 2008. The couple's second child, daughter Finley Rae Martineau Baldwin, was born August 7, 2009. In 2011, Baldwin and his wife announced that they had dropped their divorce filings and were attempting to reconcile. However, in 2012, Joanne filed for divorce again.

In November 2014, Baldwin announced his engagement to Robin Sue Hertz Hempel, an entrepreneur. They called off their engagement in 2020. On December 31, 2022, Baldwin married D'Asia Bellamy. Their wedding ceremony took place in Iglesias, Sardinia. The couple's first child, a son, named William "Bat" Baldwin, was born on June 1, 2023.

In June 2017, Baldwin relocated to Cleveland, New York, to be closer to extended family. He joined WTLA in Syracuse in September 2017 and left the station in April 2019, stating that he had accomplished what he wanted to do with the radio show.

=== Addiction and arrests ===
In 1998, Baldwin was found running naked through the halls of New York's Plaza Hotel shouting his own last name and was arrested for possession of cocaine. He pleaded guilty to disorderly conduct and was sentenced to three months in drug rehab. He later told People magazine that he had been battling cocaine addiction since 1989.

He was arrested again on July 19, 2006. According to the police, Baldwin ran a red light after weaving through the traffic in West L.A. just before 1 pm, then crashed his rented Ford Thunderbird into two parked cars while going 80 mph (130 km/h) in a 35 mph (56 km/h) zone. Jason Lee, a spokesman for the Los Angeles police, said: "The Thunderbird pushed one of the vehicles about 20 feet (6.1 m), and that was a Hummer." Police say Baldwin was driving with a suspended license at the time of the crash. He was transferred to UCLA Medical Center with back and neck injuries but did not appear to be seriously hurt.

On November 7, 2006, Baldwin was arrested in Santa Monica, California, after allegedly stealing a white GMC Yukon SUV. The actor was taken to jail and booked for investigation of grand theft auto; bail was set at $20,000. "The car belongs to an acquaintance of Mr. Baldwin, but he had no permission to take it", said Jim Amormino, a spokesman for the Orange County Sheriff's Department. The charges were subsequently dropped.

On February 6, 2007, an arrest warrant was issued for Baldwin in Newport Beach, California, by the Orange County Superior Court for his failure to show up for an arraignment stemming from an auto-theft charge.

Baldwin starred on the VH1 reality television show Celebrity Rehab with Dr. Drew, filmed in 2007, but left the show after the fourth episode. His stated reasons for leaving included having a prior commitment to an acting job and the others' behavior interfering with his recovery. It was eventually reported that he left because of inappropriate text messages he had sent to Mary Carey, a fellow patient in his treatment group.

== Filmography ==
=== Film ===
Year	Title	Role	Notes
1988	Too Good to Be True	Leif	TV movie
1989	L.A. Takedown	Bobby Schwartz	TV movie
1989	Born on the Fourth of July	Veteran No #1	
1991	Nothing but Trouble	Artie, Dealer No #1	
1991	Harley Davidson and the Marlboro Man	Alexander	
1991	The Heroes of Desert Storm	Sergeant Ben Pennington	TV movie
1992	Knight Moves	Detective Andy Wagner	
1992	Ned Blessing: The True Story of My Life	Ned Blessing	TV movie
1992	Hero	Fireman Denton	(Note: Credited as Daniel Leroy Baldwin)
1993	Attack of the 50 Ft. Woman	Harry Archer	TV movie
1994	Car 54, Where Are You?	Don Motti	
1994	Dead on Sight	Caleb Odell	
1995	Bodily Harm	Sam McKeon	
1995	Family of Cops	Ben Fein	TV movie
1996	Mulholland Falls	FBI Special Agent Jeffrey McCafferty	
1996	Yesterday's Target	Paul Harper	TV movie
1996	Trees Lounge	Jerry	
1996	Twisted Desire	William Stanton	TV movie
1997	The Invader	Jack	
1998	Vampires	Anthony Montoya	
1998	Love Kills	Danny Tucker	
1998	The Pandora Project	Captain John Lacy	
1998	Phoenix	Detective James Nutter	
1998	The Treat	Tony	
1998	On the Border	Ed	TV movie
1999	Fallout	J.J. 'Jim' Hendricks	
1999	Desert Thunder	Lee Miller	
1999	Active Stealth	Captain Murphy	Video
1999	Water Damage	Paul Preedy	
1999	Killing Moon	Frank Conroy	TV movie
1999	Silicon Towers	Tom Neufield	
1999	Wild Grizzly	Harlan Adams	TV movie
2000	Homicide: The Movie	Detective Beau Felton	TV movie
2000	Gamblin	Pike	Short
2000	Double Frame	Detective Frank Tompkins	
2000	Net Worth	Robert Freedman	
2001	Fall	Anthony Carlotti	
2001	In Pursuit	Rick	Video
2002	Bare Witness	Detective Killian	Video
2002	The Real Deal	Vince Vasser	
2002	Tunnel	Seale	Video
2003	Open House	King	TV movie
2003	Ancient Warriors	Jasper 'Jaz' Harding	
2003	Stealing Candy	Walt Gearson	
2003	King of the Ants	Ray Mathews	
2003	Water's Edge	Mayor Block	
2003	Silver Man	Eddy	
2004	Irish Eyes	Sean Phelan	
2004	Paparazzi	Wendell Stokes	
2004	Anonymous Rex	Ernie Watson	TV movie
2004	Dynamite	Jack 'Alpha'	
2005	Boardwalk Poets	Russo	
2005	Our Fathers	Angelo DeFranco	TV movie
2005	Sidekick	Chuck	
2006	I'll Be There with You	Constantine	
2006	Final Move	Jasper Haig	
2006	The Beach Party at the Threshold of Hell	Clark Remington	
2006	Shut Up and Shoot!	Field Commander Burns	
2007	Vegas Vampires	Detective Burns	
2007	Moola	Harry	
2007	The Blue Rose	Eddie	
2008	Born of Earth	Danny Kessler	
2008	The Devil's Dominoes	Sheriff Farley	
2008	Little Red Devil	Luc Tyer	
2008	A Darker Reality	The Ghost	
2009	Grey Gardens	Julius Krug	TV movie
2009	Shadowheart	Mr. McKinley	
2009	Nine Dead	Detective Seager	
2010	The Truth	Gabriel's Father	
2010	Death and Cremation	Bill Weaver	
2010	Ashley's Ashes	Bloom	
2010	Christmas with a Capital C	Mitch Bright	
2011	Stripperland	'Double D'	Video
2011	Oba: The Last Samurai	Colonel Pollard	(Note: Also known as Battle of the Pacific)
2011	Operation Belvis Bash	Namco Douglas	
2011	Will	Howard	Short
2012	Return to Vengeance	Bart	
2012	After Effect	Senator Davis	
2012	Cell Count	Blair Norris	
2012	The Unbroken	Bruce Middlebrooks	
2013	City Baby	Cloey's Dad	
2013	Mosaic	Nick Caruso	
2013	Out West	Gordo	
2013	The Sound of Trains	Jacob	Short
2013	A Little Christmas Business	Don Collier	
2013	H.O.A. Havoc	'Lucky' Betts	
2014	Helen Alone	Jack	
2014	The Wisdom to Know the Difference	Bob	
2015	Bound	Walter	Video
2015	Hope Lost	Ettore	
2015	No Deposit	Bryan Canning	
2015	Deadly Sanctuary	Dr. Price	
2015	Lady Psycho Killer	Daniel's Father	
2015	Sicilian Vampire	Vito	
2016	Divorce Texas Style	Alan James	
2016	The Guest House	Mr. Silver	
2016	The Red Maple Leaf	Richard Barton	
2017	The Neighborhood	Gianluca Moretti	
2017	Anabolic Life	Mr. Louis	
2017	Two Faced	Rich Barry	
2018	The Joke Thief	Freddy C.	
2018	Death Kiss	Dan Forthright	
2019	Crossbreed	Secretary of Defense Weathers	
2019	The Last Big Save	Team Cheetah Trainer	
2019	Making a Deal with the Devil	Chertoff	
2019	South of Heaven: Episode 2 - The Shadow	Detective Pete	
2020	The 420 Movie: Mary & Jane	Edgar J. Hightower	
2021	Clean Sweep	Soltan Niemand	
2022	Gutter	Salvador Rossi	
2022	ChrisAnder	Michael	
2022	Bring Him Back Dead	Boothe	
2022	Enchantress	Mike	
2025	The Caretaker		

=== Television ===
Year	Title	Role	Notes
1989	Family Ties	Holworthy	Episode: "Basic Trainin"
1989	Charles in Charge	Daryl Furman	Episode: "Charles Splits: Part 1"
1989	CBS Summer Playhouse	Guppie	Episode: "Curse of the Corn People"
1990	Sydney	'Cheezy'	Main Cast
1993	The Larry Sanders Show	Himself	Episode: "The List"
1993–95	Homicide: Life on the Street	Detective Beau Felton	Main Cast: Season 1–3
1998	Road Rules	Himself	Episode: "Club Sandwiches Not Seals"
1998	Dead Man's Gun	Joe Wagner	Episode: "Seven Deadly Sins"
1999	Hollywood Squares	Himself/Panelist	Recurring Guest
1999	The Outer Limits	Dan Kagan	Episode: "Essence of Life"
2001	Twice in a Lifetime	Roger Hamilton/Dr. Lenny Shalton	Episode: "Then Love Came Along"
2002	NYPD Blue	Detective Frank Hughes	Episode: "Dead Meat in New Deli"
2002	Touched by an Angel	Buzz Wescott	Episode: "Jump!"
2003–03	Pyramid	Himself/Celebrity Contestant	Recurring Guest
2004	World Poker Tour	Himself/Contestant	Episode: "Hollywood Home Game III"
2004	Celebrity Blackjack	Himself/Contestant	Episode: "Tournament 8, Game 8"
2005	Celebrity Fit Club	Himself/Contestant	Main Cast: Season 1
2007	The Sopranos	Himself/Sally Boy	Episode: "Stage 5" & "Kennedy and Heidi"
2008	Celebrity Rehab with Dr. Drew	Himself/Rehab Patient	Main Cast: Season 1
2008	The Closer	Mark Yates	Episode: "Cherry Bomb"
2008–12	World's Dumbest...	Himself/Host	Recurring Host: Season 1–14
2009	I'm a Celebrity...Get Me Out of Here!	Himself/Contestant	Main Cast: Season 2
2009–10	Cold Case	Moe Kitchener	Recurring Cast: Season 6–7
2010	E! True Hollywood Story	Himself	Episode: "Charlie Sheen"
2012	CelebriDate	Himself/Contestant	Episode: "Daniel Baldwin"
2012	Grimm	Lieutenant Jordan Vance	Episode: "Plumed Serpent"
2013–15	Hawaii Five-0	Paul Delano	Guest Cast: Season 3 & 5
2014	Celebrity Wife Swap	Himself/Contestant	Episode: "Daniel Baldwin/Jermaine Jackson"
2014–16	Soba Life	Himself/Host	Main Host
2015	Celebrity Big Brother 16	Himself/Contestant	Main Cast: Season 16
2022	Angel Dust	Malphas	Episode: "Devils Design"

=== Director ===
Year	Title	Notes
2000	Tunnel	
2000	Fall	
2001	Dan	
2014	The Wisdom to Know the Difference	Also Actor and writer
2020	My Promise to P.J.	
