= Too Good to Be True (film) =

- Genre: Drama; Thriller
- Teleplay by: Timothy Bradshaw
- Story by: Ben Ames Williams
- Directed by: Christian I. Nyby II
- Starring: Loni Anderson; Patrick Duffy; Glynnis O'Connor; Larry Drake; Daniel Baldwin; Neil Patrick Harris; James Sikking; Julie Harris
- Music by: Michel Rubini
- Country of origin: United States
- Original language: English

Production
- Executive producer: Ted Raynor
- Producers: John Newland; Judith Parker
- Cinematography: Michael D. Margulies
- Editor: Steven Cohen
- Running time: 120 minutes
- Production company: Newland/Raynor Productions Inc.

Original release
- Network: NBC
- Release: November 14, 1988

Too Good to Be True is a 1988 American made-for-television drama film starring Loni Anderson, Patrick Duffy, Daniel Baldwin, Glynnis O'Connor, Larry Drake, Neil Patrick Harris, James Sikking, and Julie Harris. It was adapted for the small screen by Timothy Bradshaw, based on the novel Leave Her to Heaven by Ben Ames Williams and was directed by Christian I. Nyby II. After John M. Stahl's Leave Her to Heaven, this is the second film adaption of Williams' book.

== Plot ==
Richard Harland an author, and his son, Danny, are visiting Richard's attorney and friend, Glen for the summer. Richard is a widower whose wife was killed in a car accident that crippled Danny. When they arrive, a beautiful woman, Ellen Berent, catches Richard's eye and it is revealed that she is also staying at Glen's with her mother, Margaret, and sister, Ruth. Glen tries to dissuade Richard from pursuing Ellen by mentioning her engagement to Russell Quinton, but a smitten Richard tells him to mind his own business. Ellen is also taken with Richard and ends her engagement with Russell to be with Richard.

Ellen convinces Richard to marry her, and they do so quickly. Ellen soon shows her dark side by becoming manipulative and jealous. At their lake house, she causes a rift between Richard and the long time caretaker by insinuating that he hit on her. She fires Danny's long time caregiver. When Margaret and Ruth visit, Richard talks to Ruth about using her artwork for the cover of his upcoming book causing Ellen to have a fit. Ellen has been teaching Danny how to do distance swimming to the buoys while she sits in a row boat. One day, Danny complains of a cramp and Ellen ignores his pleas for help. Richard, inside working, hears Danny's screams for help and rushes out onto the water in a speed boat. Ellen pretends to try and help look for him as they both repeatedly dive in the water, but it is too late, and Danny drowns.

Richard becomes more withdrawn from Ellen and begins sleeping in a guest bedroom at their house. Ellen panics as she loses her grip on Richard, and she goes in the guest room and wakes him up and they have sex. Ellen announces she is pregnant and they seem happy for a little while. Ellen tells Ruth she hates being pregnant and that Richard only cares about the baby, not her. Ellen sees her doctor and tells her she wants an abortion and she has not discussed it with Richard. The doctor, who also a friend of Richard's says she cannot perform the abortion and be expected to keep it a secret from Richard, telling Ellen she'll have to go somewhere else.

Ellen sneaks out of the house and goes to the lake house, where she stages her "accidental" fall, causing her to lose the baby. Richard, who has begun spending more time with Ruth, admits to her that he thinks Ellen losing the baby was for the best, and that he plans on leaving her because he does not love her anymore, and was only staying with her because of the baby. Ellen makes the connection that Richard is involved with Ruth when she sees the cover of his new book, with Ruth's art. Richard tells her they need some time apart and that he is going to New York for a few days. Beside herself, Ellen begins plotting revenge.

Ellen tells Ruth about the sleepless nights and nightmares she has been having and asks Ruth for her prescription barbiturate sleeping pills. Ruth goes to get them for her, and Ellen looks through her purse and finds a plane ticket to New York. Ellen opens all of the capsules and dumps the powder into a sweetener packet and then puts the capsules back together, filling them with talcum powder. At Ellen's birthday party, she asks Richard to talk to her privately in another room, and she alludes to knowing what is going on between him and Ruth. As they argue, he confronts her about Danny's death. She admits to letting him drown because Richard paid more attention to Danny, than to her. Richard hits her causing her to fall, and he storms out of the house. Ruth and Margaret come in to console her, and Ruth stirs the sweetener, that is really the sleeping pill powder placed there by Ellen, into iced tea that Ellen drinks.

Later that same day, Ruth is packing for her trip, she hears Ellen calling out to her and asks her to call the hospital, telling her she took sleeping pills. Ruth believes she is faking it and goes and counts the sleeping pills she gave Ruth, seeing that only one is missing. Ellen ends up dying, and although initially classified as a suicide, Ruth is arrested and put on trial for murder. The district attorney is Ellen's ex-fiancé, Russell and he presents evidence that Ruth was jealous of Ellen and that Ellen sent him a letter mentioning Ruth trying to kill her. Margaret finds the swapped out sweetener packet and powder residue in the pocket of the jacket Ellen wore at the party. Testing concludes that Ellen tried to stage her own murder, and the charges against Ruth are dropped. Richard and Ruth are seen at the lake house together.

== Cast ==
- Loni Anderson as Ellen Berent
- Patrick Duffy as Richard Harland
- Glynnis O'Connor as Ruth Berent
- Neil Patrick Harris as Danny Harland
- Julie Harris as Margaret Berent
- Larry Drake as Glen Robie
- James Sikking as Russell Quinton (credited as James B. Sikking)
