= Namrata Singh Gujral =

Indian-American filmmaker (active 2001– )

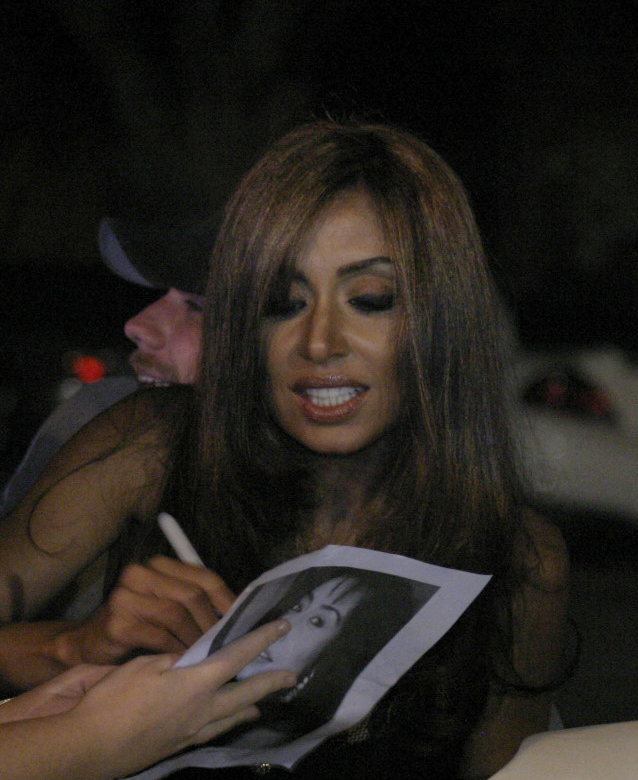
- Namrata Singh Gujral on the set of Americanizing Shelley in 2006
- Occupations: Film director and producer

Namrata Singh Gujral is an Indian director, retired film actress, motivational speaker.

== Early life ==
Gujral was born to a father who is a Punjabi Sikh, and mother who is part Tibetan and part Portuguese.

== Career ==
Gujral started her career as an actress in the 2001 film Training Day.

She later became President of Uniglobe Entertainment, a Hollywood based studio, which focuses on socially relevant international projects for the North American market. Gujral’s first production, Americanizing Shelley (2007) starring Beau Bridges and Wil Wheaton, was released theatrically in 24 countries with Warner Bros.

Her directorial debut came about after surviving breast cancer; she produced, directed and appeared in Uniglobe Entertainment's 2010 cancer docudrama 1 a Minute. The film includes breast cancer survivors Olivia Newton-John, Diahann Carroll, Melissa Etheridge, Mumtaz, Jaclyn Smith and cancer survivors Lisa Ray, Barbara Mori and cancer treatment advocates Deepak Chopra, William Baldwin, Daniel Baldwin, Priya Dutt and Nancy Brinker.

Gujral's 2018 venture 5 Weddings, a Hollywood-Bollywood rom-com, features international stars Rajkummar Rao, Nargis Fakhri, Golden Globe nominee Bo Derek and Academy Awards nominee Candy Clark and opened theatrically in 54 countries. The film delves into the lives of Hijras, a group of transgender/eunuch dancers at Indian weddings, who are socially ostracized.

Her 2024 fim America, Invaded starring Nick Searcy was distributed widely in the swing states and credited with assisting in voting turnout. In an interview with Pete Hegseth, on Fox News, Gujral claimed she was a registered Democrat who believed in strong borders.

== Health ==
In 2008, Gujral was treated for early stage, invasive breast cancer. She underwent surgery and chemotherapy. She hosts Thrive! With Namrata, a panel based show with cancer survivors on the Thrive Channel.

In 2013, she was treated for Burkitt's lymphoma. She was treated with aggressive chemotherapy including intrathecal chemotherapy at City of Hope for six months. The cause of lymphoma was prior chemotherapy from 2008 for breast cancer. In 2013, Gujral was in remission from both cancers.

== Music ==
Gujral made her singing debut with the single "Dancin' In The Clouds", an American country rock meets Bollywood style duet, with country singer Steve Azar. The video appeared on CMT, MTV and VH1. Hollywood composer Jay Ferguson produced the single, reportedly making her the first American artist with Eastern roots to be featured on CMT.

== Awards and recognition ==
Lifetime TV honored Gujral as one of their “Remarkable Women” making her the first Indian-American to join the ranks of other notables such as Michelle Obama and Hillary Clinton. The honor was awarded for her production 1 a Minute.

For her role as Saira Ahmed on the CBS series Family Law, Gujral, along with co-stars Tony Danza and Kathleen Quinlan, were Columbia TriStar's official nomination for the 2002 Emmy Awards.

== Filmography ==
- Training Day (2001)
- Dragnet (2004)
- Family Law (2001)
- Passions (NBC, 2001–2005)
- The Agency (CBS, 2001–2002)
- Mitsein (2009)
- House of Sand and Fog (2003)
- Kaante (2002)
- Americanizing Shelley (2007)
- 1 a Minute (2010)
- Thrive! With Namrata (2014)
- Ultimate Survivor (2015)
- You Can Thrive (2016)
- Destination Survival (2016)
- 5 Weddings (2018)
- America's Forgotten (2020)
- America's Forgotten 2 (2021)

== Music videos ==
Year	Video
2007	"Dancin' in the Clouds" (with Steve Azar)
