= Paradise, Texas (film) =

- Directed by: Lorraine Senna
- Written by: Joe Conway; Tom Asina; Stephen Brian Dowdall
- Starring: Timothy Bottoms; Ben Estus; Meredith Baxter
- Release date: April 21, 2006
- Running time: 90 minutes
- Country: United States
- Language: English

Paradise, Texas is a 2006 family drama film directed by Lorraine Senna and starring Timothy Bottoms, Ben Estus, and Meredith Baxter. Premiering at the 2006 WorldFest Film Festival, Paradise, Texas received a Gold Remi Award. After a limited theatrical release, the film was made available on DVD in October 2006.

== Plot ==
The film follows aging, overworked actor Mack Cameron (Timothy Bottoms) as he struggles to keep up with the demands of career and family life. Cameron accepts a lead role in a low-budget independent film despite schedule conflicts with a major movie role he's lined up for, because it will be filmed in his small hometown of Littleton, Texas. Cameron sees the project as an opportunity to mend fraying relationships with his wife, Liz (Meredith Baxter), and sons Tyler (Dylan Michael Patton) and Joe (Emilio Mazur). Cameron's frustration boils over when he learns he has been removed from his role in the upcoming blockbuster because of his decision to work close to home. Cameron lashes out at the people around him, further alienating his family and wreaking havoc on the set. Cameron's child co-star, CJ Kinney (Ben Estus) is particularly affected. CJ's desire for a performing career alienates him from his peers and family, especially from his overbearing father Cal (Brandon Smith). Interaction with CJ inspires Cameron to re-assess his priorities; ultimately, he opts to put his family and life in his hometown ahead of his career.

== Cast ==
- Timothy Bottoms as Mack Cameron
- Ben Estus as CJ Kinney
- Meredith Baxter as Liz Cameron
- Sheryl Lee as Betsy Kinney
- Polly Bergen as Beverly Cameron
- Rider Strong as Charlie
- Brandon Smith as Cal Kinney
- Connie Cooper as Martha Neering
- Dylan Michael Patton as Tyler Cameron
- Emilio Mazur as Joe Cameron
- Dallas Kiser as Melody Kinney
- Ricky Guzman as Student
- J. Pittman McGehee as Farmer

== Production ==
Developed under the working title On the Rocks, the film was directed by Lorraine Senna and written by Joe Conway, Tom Asina and Stephen Brian Dowdall. Most shooting was done on location in a small town outside of Houston for added realism. The William Morris Agency attempted distribution of the film, with limited success. The film premiered at the Angelika Film Center at the opening night of Houston's WorldFest Film Festival on April 21, 2006, and followed with a one-week run there. It continued with a brief run at Angelika's Dallas theater. The film was released to DVD on October 27, 2006.

== Critical reception ==
Paradise, Texas won a Gold Remi Award at the 2006 WorldFest Film Festival. It received mixed reviews from film critics, who praised the film's cast, but dismissed the script as "cliche-ridden" and "contrived". Senna's direction was offered praise, (some of it backhanded). More broadly, the film's warmth led it to be seen as a success, measured against the standards of the family-oriented audience for which it was presumably intended. Three out of four Rotten Tomatoes ratings for the film were positive.
