= To Kill a Nazi =

Documentary film directed by Boaz Dvir

In this feature documentary, filmmaker Boaz Dvir tells the story of a Holocaust survivor who set out to kill his father’s Nazi executioner.

To Kill a Nazi is a documentary in post-production by filmmaker Boaz Dvir that details the untold story of Michel Cojot.

== Synopsis ==
The character study follows Holocaust survivor Michel Cojot through post-war life as a Parisian banker, a Nazi hunter on the trail of Klaus Barbie, and a pivotal player in the raid on Entebbe, as he and his son Olivier, 12 at the time, were among those held hostage by the terrorists.

== Production ==
The film premiered Jun 22, 2026 at the Dances With Films festival in Los Angeles.

“Few people get a shot at righting history,” Dvir said. “Michel got two. In 1975-76, he was catapulted twice onto the global stage. He certainly made the most of his second chance in Entebbe.”

Dvir interviewed 24 people around the world, making sure that all information was confirmed by at least two sources. The interviewees include Michel Cojot's family members, Nazi hunters Serge and Beate Klarsfeld, Operation Thunderbolt lead pilot Joshua Shani and commando officer Rami Sherman, French historians Vincent Duclert and Shmuel Trigano, hidden-children expert Raphaël Delpard, and bestselling British author Saul David.

Besides directing the project, Dvir serves as producer, writer and composer. University of Florida professor Gayle Zachmann, a French and Jewish Studies specialist, serves as historical consultant and co-producer. Matthew Einstein, CEO of Tradition Pictures and former director of development for Atmosphere Entertainment, serves as a producer on "To Kill a Nazi."

== Release ==
The final version of the film - titled To Kill a Nazi - was released in 2026. The final version will be approximately 100 minutes.

Northwestern University's Holocaust Educational Foundation hosted a screening and a Q&A with Dvir in 2020.

The Jewish Federation of Brevard in Melbourne, Fla., also hosted a rough-cut screening in 2020 at a local movie theater. After the screening, Dvir answered the audience's questions and signed copies of his latest book, “Saving Israel: The Unknown Story of Smuggling Weapons and Winning a Nation’s Independence” (Rowman & Littlefield, 2020).

Two rough-cut screenings were held in 2019 at Penn State Paterno Library's Foster Auditorium and the Reading Jewish Film Series, co-sponsored by Reading's Trinity Lutheran Church. Both screenings featured a post-screening discussion with Dvir.

There was another screening of the film at Beth Chaim Synagogue in Malvern, Pa. in 2018. The film was screened by the University of Florida's Jewish Studies Department at the Hippodrome Theater in downtown Gainesville the same year. The first rough cut screening took place at Penn State Great Valley in 2017. The movie's rough cut was also screened at Penn State Abington and in Baltimore at the Beth El Congregation.

A 20-minute preview of the film (originally titled "Cojot") was screened at the American Jewish Historical Society in New York City in March 2016. The Mark G. Loeb Center for Lifelong Learning and the Louise D. & Morton J. Macks Center for Jewish Education hosted a preview in Baltimore.

The world premier took place at Dances With Films on June 22, 2026.

== See also ==
- Operation Thunderbolt (film)
- Victory at Entebbe (film)
- Raid on Entebbe (film)
- Seven Days in Entebbe
