= Sidekick (film) =

- Promotional film poster
- Directed by: Blake Van de Graaf
- Written by: Michael Sparaga
- Produced by: Michael Sparaga; Tom Mudd
- Starring: David Ingram; Perry Mucci; Mackenzie Lush
- Cinematography: Jordan Cushing
- Distributed by: Maple Pictures; Lightyear Entertainment
- Release date: September 26, 2005 (Canada)
- Running time: 87 minutes
- Country: Canada
- Language: English

Sidekick is a 2005 Canadian independent film in the comic-book/fantasy genre, directed by Blake Van de Graaf. The film centres on tech support nerd and comic-book fan Norman Neale, who discovers that his co-worker Victor Ventura has telekinetic powers. Neale trains Ventura with the intention of creating a super-hero, but Ventura has other uses for his powers in mind.

== Character histories ==
Norman Neale: Norman lives a dull life in a small apartment. He works as a computer technician in a large corporation to pay the bills and on the side he works at his favorite comic book store in exchange for free comic books. He also refuses to let Chuck pay him in cash. When he discovers that Victor has superpowers, his first reaction is that Victor could become a superhero. However, Norman discovers too late that Victor becomes the opposite and that it's up to him to stop Victor. Norman seems attracted to Andrea, but is too shy to talk to her.

Victor Ventura: Victor works for Richmond Financial, the same corporation as Norman, handling the company's accounts along with Carson. He is a favorite of the boss and has his eyes on an executive position. Victor has had telekinetic powers since he was twelve, though very limited in range. It appears Victor starts his training with sincere purposes. However, it is revealed that he is just a money-hungry businessman who, in the end, turns evil, using his powers to steal money.

Andrea Hicks: A receptionist for Richmond Financial. She is attracted to Victor, though he does not notice her. She blames her dead-end position on her gender, a claim that is seemingly true, based on the character of her boss. She is willing to manipulate those around her to get what she wants. Though, in the end she returns to help Norman defeat Victor.

Chuck: Chuck runs Excalibur Comics. He has a wife and a son. His business has nearly tripled since he let Norman post his store on the internet, but he cannot convince Norman to take his share in the profits. He offers sage advice without realizing it and believes himself to be an expert on what you should and should not do when writing a comic book.

Carson Fleming: A manipulative trader who uses a fake project to try to bed women. His death is what initially drives Victor to work on his powers.

Mr. Richmond: CEO of Richmond Financial who plays favorites with Victor, largely it seems for his softball skills.

== Plot summary ==
Norman Neale and his best friend Chuck have an ongoing debate on the subject of "what single superpower would you choose?" Then, one day, Norman notices Victor Ventura, a successful trader at Richmond financial, the company he works for. While the two are both getting coffee, Norman accidentally drops a mug. Victor amazingly catches the mug in midair. Though impressed, Norman dismisses it as good reflexes. Later, Mr. Richmond, company CEO, asks Norman to videotape Victor at the company softball game. He notices that as Victor is about to hit the ball, the video momentarily displays static interference, and begins to suspect Victor has Telekinesis.

Norman confirms his theory with a small trap, but Victor catches Norman watching and threatens to have him fired if he doesn't back off. Victor knows he has powers, but also fears that if they become public he would be institutionalized and studied. Norman consults Chuck on what to do, and after an initial misunderstanding, Norman lets Chuck continue to believe that Victor is a comic book character of Norman's creation. Chuck suggests training Victor and Norman agrees, but again Victor refuses to go along with it.

Meanwhile, Victor's competition, Carson Fleming, introduces the secretary, Andrea Hicks, into a secret project of his. He claims that once he is finished the project and presents it to Mr. Richmond they will both be rewarded. One night Carson and Victor go out drinking. On their way home, Carson slips on a curb and falls into the path of a car. Victor tries to use his powers to save Carson, but isn't strong enough. Carson is run over and killed. Victor returns to Norman and agrees to let him train him.

Norman sets about training Victor, increasing his range and strength. The two also discover his weakness; Alcohol causes his concentration to diminish severely, drastically reducing his powers. Norman ends the training by making Victor save him from the same situation he lost Carson in. He then offers to make Victor "Victory Man", a real life superhero. Victor, mad at Norman for what he pulled, calls him delusional and tells him to go. Later that day, however, Victor decides to treat Norman to one night of crime fighting as payment for the training. The pair run into a gang of street thugs, who threaten them. Victor quickly defeats them with his powers, but then begins to force two of the toughs to do humiliating things to each other. Norman begs Victor to stop and they both leave.

Norman tells Chuck that he has given up on Victor, because he has no compassion left. Chuck tells him that he shouldn't give up on his comic-book, because now he has a "killer villain". Realizing this may be true, he quickly leaves to find Victor. At the same time Andrea shows up at Victor's house, telling Victor that she still wants in on Carson's project. Victor reveals that there was never any project and that it was all a scheme, created by Victor for Carson, to get girls. An argument ensues, but is cut short by the arrival of Norman. As he enters, Andrea is not there, and Norman informs Victor he wants out of the partnership. He also accidentally reveals Chuck as his confidant. Norman leaves and then Andrea is shown to be paralyzed and hidden in the closet. He gets information on chuck from her and heads out to find him. Just after closing time, Victor breaks into Chuck's comic book store and kills Chuck.

Victor breaks into Norman's house and demands that Norman help him steal money from Richmond Financial. The two break into the corporate building after dark. Victor reveals that Andrea is being help captive and threatens to hurt her if Norman doesn't continue to help. Before he begins hacking the company computer, he suggests they have an alcoholic drink. Norman only drinks a little, but while waiting a long time for Norman to do his work (Norman was actually stalling), Victor drinks nearly the rest of the bottle. Norman waits until Victor has passed out before going into the men's bathroom, where he takes off his suit to reveal that he is wearing the Victory Man costume.

Norman releases Andrea and tells her to run. Then he tapes Victor to a rolling chair and rolls him to the elevator. While waiting for the elevator, Victor comes to, but isn't focused enough to use his powers. Norman reveals that he put sleeping pills into the scotch and that he's turning Victor in. As they talk, Victor regains his focus and attempts to push Norman down the elevator shaft. Before Victor can finish Norman off, however, Andrea returns and knocks him out with a fire extinguisher

Norman is interrogated by the police. Norman tries to warn them of Victor's powers, but they refuse to believe it. As a result, Victor breaks free of his hand-cuffs, kills the guard and escapes.

== Main cast ==
- David Ingram - Victor Ventura
- Perry Mucci - Norman Neale
- Mackenzie Lush - Andrea Hicks
- Daniel Baldwin - Chuck
- Julian Osen - Carson Fleming
- Daniel Krolik - Bob
- John Illingworth - Mr. Richmond
- Pat Brown - Larry Thornton
- Ryan Ward - Ted Harris
- Ken Lashley - Himself

== Reception ==
Sidekick received a 100% on Rotten Tomatoes.
