= Class of Her Own =

2024 documentary by Boaz Dvir

- Release poster
- Directed by: Boaz Dvir
- Written by: Boaz Dvir
- Produced by: Boaz Dvir; Matt Einstein; Emil Pinnock
- Starring: Gloria Jean Merriex
- Narrated by: Tamara Tunie
- Edited by: Boaz Dvir
- Production companies: Dvir Productions; Unleashing Giants; Tradition Pictures
- Distributed by: Freestyle Digital Media
- Release date: 2024
- Running time: 86 minutes
- Country: United States
- Language: English

Class of Her Own (formerly Discovering Gloria) is a documentary feature film by Boaz Dvir released in 2024. The documentary captures Gloria Merriex’s transformation into an educational innovator and shows her engaging her math, reading, and science students at the most effective levels through unconventional teaching practices, which included hip-hop and dance routines.

== Background ==
Gloria Jean Merriex grew up on the east side of Gainesville, Fla.. She earned an education degree from the University of Florida and spent her entire career at Duval Elementary School. In 2008, Merriex died of a diabetic stroke. She died after receiving a W.K. Kellogg Foundation grant to share her teaching breakthroughs on a national level.

Dvir found inspiration for the film after talking with Don Pemberton, director of UF’s Lastinger Center for Learning, who had previously sent professors and doctoral students to watch Merriex's teaching methods. While Dvir never personally met Merriex, he had over 150 hours of footage to use for his project.

Most of the funding for the film came from the Kellogg Foundation, with Dvir having final cut on the project.

Dvir admitted that after working on the film, his own thinking had shifted: "[Class of Her Own] made me feel quite differently about standardized testing."

== Synopsis ==
The film focuses on Merriex’s transformation by way of archival footage and interviews with her students, family, and colleagues.

Class of Her Own shows how Merriex helped Duval Elementary leap from an F on the Florida Comprehensive Assessment Test in 2002 to an A the following year.

In one of the interviews, Prof. Elizabeth Bondy – former director of the University of Florida College of Education’s School of Teaching and Learning, who studied Merriex's methods – described how and why Merriex broke vital new ground in the primary education field.

"She didn't move to using music because she studied Howard Gardner's work about multiple intelligences," Bondy says in the documentary. "She moved to using music and movement and the other strategies that she used because she studied her students."

== Reception ==
More than 500 people – including many of Merriex's former students – attended a rough-cut screening for Class of Her Own in East Gainesville. The post-screening panel discussion featured Bondy along with University of Texas Associate Prof. Emily Bonner, Alachua County School Board Member Leanetta McNealy, and UF College of Education Associate Dean for Research Thomasenia Adams.

In her book Unearthing Culturally Responsive Mathematics Teaching, Bonner described the documentary as "compelling".

In her op-ed in the St. Augustine Record, Pam Thor called Class of Her Own a "fabulous documentary" and urged all teachers and policymakers to watch it.

In her article in The Gainesville Sun about the documentary’s first screening, Aida Mallard wrote that Discovering Gloria brings Gloria Jean Merriex "to life".

Referencing the popular ABC sitcom, Peter Greene of Forbes described “Class of Her Own” as a “real-life mirror of Abbott Elementary.”

In his review of Class of Her Own, film critic Dan Domench wrote, "The director, Boaz Dvir, saw something larger happening in Merriex and brought that truth forward."

The documentary has been screened as an official selection in several U.S. film festivals and universities, including the following:

- Charlotte Black Film Festival (June 2024)
- Ann Arbor Black Film Festival (June 2024)
- Juneteenth Film Festival (June 2024)
- University Film & Video Association's annual conference (August 2024)
- Orlando Urban Film Festival (August 2024)
- Eastern Michigan University (September 2024)
- Michigan State University (September 2024)
- Baltimore International Film Festival (October 2024)
- Penn State Dickinson Law (October 2024)
- Monadnock International Film Festival (October 2024)
- Fort Lauderdale International Film Festival
- Helsinki Education Film Festival International (November 2024)

== Awards ==
Class of Her Own won Best Documentary Feature at the Windsor International Black Film Festival in Canada. The documentary has also been named a finalist for Best Documentary Feature three times (including at the Windsor Black Film Festival) and a semifinalist once. The film also earned an honorable mention from the Black Indie Filmmakers Association Houston Film Festival.
