= Holocaust, Genocide and Human Rights Education Initiative =

The Holocaust, Genocide and Human Rights Education Initiative at Penn State enables K-12 educators to provide their students with the opportunities to gain critical thinking.

Boaz Dvir, a filmmaker and Penn State associate professor, created the Holocaust, Genocide and Human Rights Education Initiative at Penn State University in 2019 to enable K-12 educators to provide their students with the opportunities to gain critical thinking, fact finding, active listening and civic discourse skills, as well as empathy.

The Initiative is part of Penn State's Hammel Family Human Rights Initiative, which Dvir also directs. The Hammel Family Human Rights Initiative was funded by a $5 million award provided by Penn State alumni Victor and Dena Hammel. The initiative was launched in response to Pennsylvania's Act 70 of 2014, which called on educators to develop programming about the Holocaust, genocides and other human rights violations.

The initiative offers year- and semester-long programs, workshops and self-paced online modules. The Initiative's first module, "Trauma-Informed Practices," links trauma-informed professional learning with pedagogy. It assists educators with creating a trauma-informed classroom and self-care. The Initiative's second module, “Teaching Difficult Issues,” assists educators in the instruction of difficult topics such as racism and gender. The module, which takes about six hours to complete, provides participants with strategies to facilitate and engage in planned and unplanned discussions about difficult topics. The third, "Using Media to Facilitate Difficult Discussions," assists educators with effectively using media in the instruction of difficult topics.

High-caliber research conducted by the Hammel Family Human Rights Initiative has been published in three peer-reviewed journals. The papers illustrate how the initiative's programs help K-12 educators address difficult issues such as racism. The three journals that published the papers are School-University Partnerships, Journal of Practitioner Research and Journal of Teacher Education. Some of the scholars who independently reviewed the papers described the Initiative's research-based nonpartisan approach, which combines practitioner inquiry with trauma-informed and asset-based practices, as novel, innovative and widely needed.

Initiative members presented evidence of their National Endowment for the Humanities (NEH) program impact at the 2024 National Association for School-University Partnerships (NASUP) conference in Anaheim, CA. [BD1] The Initiative's nearly five-month NEH program included a weeklong residency in State College and Philadelphia and webinars and individual meetings.

As part of the initiatives, Dvir led a discussion in the Schreyer Honors College's “Dialogues of Democracy,” titled “Building a Stronger Democratic Future. Through Pedagogical Innovation” in February 2024. In his keynote speech to kick off the Aspen School District's 2023–24 school year, Dvir presented information about how educators can provide their students with insight into the human condition and opportunities to develop life skills such as critical thinking, active listening and empathy. Following another presentation made by Dvir in Aspen that summer, an anonymous donor awarded the initiative with $150,000.

Dvir and other Initiative members and graduate students presented early versions of the Initiative's instructional material at the Holocaust Center of Pittsburgh's summer 2019 teacher training. The material accompanies Dvir's post-Holocaust documentaries, “To Kill a Nazi” and “A Wing and a Prayer.”
