= List of Interscope Records artists =

This is a list of artists who have recorded for Interscope Records. The names of Interscope affiliated labels, under which the artist recorded, can be found in parentheses.

== Current ==
=== 0–9 ===
- 2hollis
- 42 Dugg (4PF/CMG/Interscope)
- 6lack (LVRN/Interscope)

=== A ===
- Anyma
- Ari Lennox (Dreamville/Interscope)

=== B ===
- Bad Gyal
- Bas (Dreamville/Interscope)
- Ben Platt
- Benny Blanco
- Billie Eilish (Darkroom/Interscope)
- Blink-182 (DGC/Interscope)
- Boygenius (Matador/Interscope)
- BoyNextDoor
- Brandi Carlile
- BTS

=== C ===
- Camila Cabello (Geffen/Interscope)
- Carly Rae Jepsen (604/Schoolboy/Interscope) (outside Canada)
- Cashmere Cat (Mad Love/Interscope)

=== D ===
- DaBaby (South Coast/Billion Dollar Baby/Interscope)
- Dermot Kennedy
- Destroy Lonely (Opium/Interscope)
- Devon Again
- DJ Snake
- Dr. Dre (Aftermath/Interscope)

=== E ===
- Ebony Riley
- Ella Mai (10 Summers/Interscope)
- Ellie Goulding (US)
- Elliot James Reay (Interscope/EMI) (US)
- Elton John (Rocket/Interscope) (US)
- Eminem (Shady/Aftermath/Interscope)
- Enhypen
- EST Gee (CMG/Warlike/EST/Interscope)

=== F ===
- Feist (US)
- Finneas
- Flatland Cavalry

=== G ===
- GloRilla (Collective/Interscope)
- Gracie Abrams
- Guns N' Roses
- Gwen Stefani

=== H ===
- Holly Humberstone (Darkroom/Interscope)
- Hunter Metts
- HXG (Opium/Interscope)

=== I ===
- Illit
- Imagine Dragons (KIDinaKORNER/Interscope)
- Inhaler
- Iván Cornejo (Zaragoza/Interscope)

=== J ===
- J. Cole (Dreamville/Interscope)
- Jay Rock (Top Dawg/Interscope)
- Jazmin Bean
- Jenevieve
- Jessie Ware
- JID (Dreamville/Interscope)
- Jordan Ward
- Judeline

=== K ===
- Kacey Musgraves (MCA Nashville/Interscope)
- Karlee Girl
- Karol G (Bichota/Interscope)
- Ken Carson (Opium/Interscope)
- Kendrick Lamar (Interscope/pgLang)
- Kevvo

=== L ===
- Laci Kaye Booth
- Lady Gaga (Streamline/Interscope)
- Lana Del Rey (Polydor/Interscope)
- Lehla Samia (Collective/Interscope)
- Lil Poppa (Collective/Rule #1/Interscope)

=== M ===
- Maroon 5 (222/Interscope)
- Marsha Ambrosius (Aftermath/Interscope)
- Megan Thee Stallion (Hot Girl/Interscope)
- MGK (EST19XX/Interscope)
- Michael Kiwanuka
- Moneybagg Yo (CMG/N-Less/Interscope)

=== N ===
- Nettspend (Grade A Productions/Interscope)
- Nine Inch Nails (The Null Corporation/Interscope)
- No Doubt

=== O ===
- Olivia Rodrigo (Geffen/Interscope)
- OneRepublic (Mosley/Interscope)

=== P ===
- People I've Met
- Pi'erre Bourne (SossHouse/Interscope)
- Playboi Carti (AWGE/Interscope/Opium)
- Prospa

=== R ===
- Rae Sremmurd (Eardruma/Interscope)
- Reneé Rapp (A&M/Interscope)
- Role Model
- Rubi Rose

=== S ===
- Schoolboy Q (TDE/Interscope)
- Selena Gomez
- Sheck Wes (Cactus Jack/GOOD Music/Interscope)
- Snoop Dogg (Death Row/Interscope)
- Sting
- Stormzy
- Summer Walker (LVRN/Interscope)

=== T ===
- TiaCorine (South Coast Music Group/Interscope)
- Tierra Whack
- Towa Bird

=== U ===
- U2 (US)

=== V ===
- Vincent Mason (Interscope/MCA Nashville/Music Soup)

=== W ===
- Wisp (Music Soup/Interscope)

=== X ===
- Xavi

=== Z ===
- Zedd
- Zico

== Former ==
=== 0–9 ===
- +44
- The 1975 (Dirty Hit/Interscope)
- 2Pac (Death Row/Amaru/Interscope)
- 2wo (Nothing/Interscope)
- 4 Non Blondes
- 4th Avenue Jones (Lookalive/Interscope)
- 5 Seconds of Summer
- 50 Cent (Interscope/Shady/Aftermath/G-Unit/Violator)

=== A ===
- AB Logic
- AFI (DGC/Interscope)
- Agnes (US)
- Akinyele
- Akira the Don
- Alessandro Safina
- Alesso
- Alexander 23
- Ali Lohan (Maloof Music/Interscope)
- All
- All Time Low
- The All-American Rejects (Doghouse Records/Interscope)
- August Ponthier
- Ama Lou
- Amaarae
- Amber Mark (PMR/Interscope)
- ...And You Will Know Us by the Trail of Dead
- Ann Marie
- Ashlee Simpson (Geffen)
- Audio Push
- Audioslave (Epic/Interscope)
- Avicii
- Azealia Banks

=== B ===
- B.B. King
- Bad Meets Evil (Shady/Interscope)
- Bad4Good
- Bahari (Rock Mafia, XIX Recordings/Interscope)
- Beck (DGC)
- Big Bad Voodoo Daddy
- Big30 (Bread Gang/N-Less/Interscope)
- Billie Jack (Geffen/Interscope)
- Black Eyed Peas
- Bilal
- Love on Ice
- Black Eyed Peas (will.i.am/A&M/Interscope)
- Black Tide
- Blackbear (Beartrap/Alamo/Interscope, now Sony Music)
- Blackpink (YG/Interscope; inactive on solo projects since 2024)
- Blackstreet
- Blacc Zacc (South Coast/Interscope)
- Blaqk Audio
- BlocBoy JB (CMG/Bloc Nation/Foundation/Interscope)
- Bobby Creekwater (Shady/Interscope)
- Bone Thugs-N-Harmony (Full Surface/Interscope)
- Bonnie McKee (A&M/Interscope)
- Brand New (DGC/Interscope)
- The Briefs
- BRS Kash (Team Litty/LVRN/Interscope)
- Brutal Juice
- Bryan Adams (A&M/Polydor/Interscope)
- Bubba Sparxxx (Mosley/Interscope)
- Bush (Trauma/Interscope)
- Busta Rhymes (Aftermath/Interscope)
- Brit Smith

=== C ===
- Campfire Girls (Boy's Life/Interscope)
- Cashis (Shady/Interscope)
- Cassie (Bad Boy/Interscope)
- Celeste (Polydor/Interscope)
- Charles Hamilton (Demevolist Music Group/Interscope)
- Charlotte Sometimes (Geffen)
- Chauncey Black (Flipmode/Geffen)
- Chester French (Star Trak/Interscope)
- Chief Keef (Glo Gang/Interscope/1017 Bricksquad)
- Chris Cornell (Mosley/Interscope)
- Chris Rock (Geffen)
- Cinema Bizarre (MCA/Cherrytree/Interscope)
- Claw Hammer
- Clique Girlz
- Colby O'Donis (Konvict/Interscope)
- Colette Carr (Cherrytree/Interscope)
- Colorhaus
- Common (Geffen)
- Counting Crows (DGC)
- Cozz (Dreamville/Interscope)
- Crooked I (Death Row/Interscope)
- Crookers (Southern Fried/Potty Mouth/Fool's Gold/Interscope)
- Cruel Santino
- Crystal Lewis (GospoCentric/Interscope)
- Cuco
- The Cure (Geffen)

=== D ===
- Daddy Yankee (El Cartel/Interscope)
- Dan Talevski (Zone 4/Interscope)
- Danny!
- Dashboard Confessional (DGC/Interscope)
- Dave
- Dawn Robinson (Aftermath/Interscope)
- Days of the New (Outpost/Geffen/Interscope)
- Daz Dillinger (Death Row/Interscope)
- Deep Blue Something
- Depswa
- Devante (Aftermath/Interscope)
- Die Antwoord (Rhythm/Interscope)
- DJ AM
- Doe B (Grand Hustle Records/Interscope)
- Drag-On (Interscope/Ruff Ryders)
- Dragpipe
- Dredg
- Drive Like Jehu
- D4vd (Darkroom/Interscope)

=== E ===
- EarthGang (Dreamville/Interscope)
- Easy Life
- El DeBarge (Geffen)
- Elbow
- Elliott Smith
- Emmy Rossum (Geffen)
- Enrique Iglesias
- Enter Shikari (Ambush Reality/Tiny Evil/DGC/Interscope)
- Ericdoa
- Escape the Fate (Eleven Seven Music)
- Esmée Denters
- Eve (Interscope/Ruff Ryders)
- Ez Mil (Shady/Aftermath/Interscope/Virgin/FFP)

=== F ===
- Fabolous (Interscope/Desert Storm)
- Fam-Lay (Star Trak/Interscope)
- Far East Movement (Cherrytree/Interscope)
- Fergie
- The Firm (Aftermath/Interscope)
- The Fixxers (Dirty West/Interscope)
- Flipsyde (Cherrytree/Interscope)
- Flyleaf
- Focus... (Aftermath/Interscope)
- Frankmusik (Cherrytree/Interscope)
- The Fratellis (Island/Interscope)
- Freddie Gibbs
- French Montana (Bad Boy/Interscope)

=== G ===
- The Game (DGC/Interscope)
- Garbage (Almo Sounds/Interscope; US distributor 1998–2000, record label 2001–2004)
- Gerardo
- Giant Drag (Kickball/Interscope)
- Girlicious (Geffen)
- Girls' Generation (SM/Interscope/Polydor France)
- Giulietta (Giulietta R. Enterprises/Interscope)
- Glaive
- Greyson Chance (eleveneleven/Interscope)
- Gryffin (Darkroom/Interscope)

=== H ===
- Haley Reinhart
- The Hard Corps
- Hed PE
- Helmet
- The Hippos
- The Hives (Octone/A&M/Interscope)
- Hoku (Geffen)
- Hollywood Hot Sauce (Zone 4/Imani/Interscope)
- Hollywood Undead (A&M/Octone/Interscope)
- Hotboii (Rebel Music/Geffen/Interscope)
- Hot Rod (Phoenix/G-Unit/Interscope)
- Huddy

=== I ===
- I-15 (Zone 4 Inc./Interscope)
- Ice Cube (Lench Mob/Interscope)
- Institute
- Ivan Cornejo (Zaragoza/Interscope)

=== J ===
- J. Lewis
- J.I (G*Starr Ent./Geffen/Interscope)
- Jaboukie Young-White
- Jace!
- Jacob Banks (Interscope/Chambre Noire Record/Darkroom)
- Jacob Collier
- Jadakiss (Ruff Ryders/Interscope)
- Jaira Burns
- James Blake (A&M/Interscope/Polydor)
- James Morrison
- Jared Evan
- Jawny
- Jaydes (A&M/Interscope)
- Jett Spike (Geffen/Interscope)
- Jennie (inactive on solo work since 2024)
- Jennifer Hudson
- Jibbs (Geffen/Interscope)
- Jimmy Eat World (Geffen/DGC/Interscope)
- Jisoo (inactive on solo work since 2024)
- Joan As Police Woman
- JoJo (Blackground/Interscope)
- Jordan Knight
- Juice Wrld (Grade A/Interscope)
- Jurassic 5

=== K ===
- K Camp (RARE Sound/Interscope)
- K'naan (A&M/Octone)
- Kaci Brown
- Kaki King
- Kali Uchis (Rinse/Virgin EMI/Interscope) (US)
- Kardinal Offishall (Kon Live/Interscope)
- Kate Voegele (MySpace/DGC/Interscope)
- Keane (Polydor/Interscope) (US)
- Kelis (will.i.am/Interscope)
- Kenna (Star Trak/Interscope)
- Keri Hilson (Zone 4/Mosley/Interscope)
- Khea (Young Flex/Interscope)
- Kina Grannis
- King Tee (Aftermath/Interscope)
- Kurupt (Death Row/Interscope)
- Keyshia Cole (A&M/Interscope)

=== L ===
- La Roux (Cherrytree/Interscope)
- LANY (Side Street/Polydor/Interscope)
- The Last Emperor (Aftermath/Interscope)
- The Lady of Rage (Death Row/Interscope)
- Lexi Jones (A&M/Interscope)
- Lifter
- Lil Durk (Only The Family/Alamo/Interscope, now Sony Music)
- Huddy (Immersive/Sandlot/Geffen/Interscope)
- Lil Mosey (Mogul Vision/Interscope)
- Lil Scrappy (G'$ Up/Geffen/Interscope)
- Lil' D (CBE (Chris Brown Entertainment)/Interscope/No Limit Forever)
- Limp Bizkit (Flip/Interscope)
- Lindi Ortega
- Lisa (inactive on solo work since 2024)
- Liz Huett
- Lloyd Banks (Interscope/G-Unit)
- LMFAO (will.i.am/Cherrytree/Interscope)
- Loretta Lynn
- Los (Bad Boy/Interscope)
- Louis the Child
- Love on Ice
- The Lovemakers (Cherrytree/Interscope)
- The Lox (Interscope/Ruff Ryders)
- Lute (Dreamville/Interscope)

=== M ===
- Madonna (Boy Toy/Live Nation/Interscope)
- Makaveli (Death Row/Makaveli/Interscope)
- Mareva Galanter
- Marianas Trench
- Marilyn Manson (Nothing/Interscope)
- Marky Mark and the Funky Bunch
- Majek Fashek
- Matt Morris (Tennman/Interscope)
- Matt White (Rykodisc/Geffen/Interscope)
- Meiko (MySpace/DGC)
- Mereba
- M.I.A.
- Mickey Avalon (MySpace/Interscope)
- Midway State
- Midwxst
- Mindless Behavior
- Miss Willie Brown
- Mobb Deep (G-Unit/Interscope)
- Mohombi (Island/2101/Interscope)
- Monica
- Morray (Pick Six/Interscope)
- Mos Def (Geffen)
- Mr. Porter (Interscope/Shady)
- Mt. Desolation (Cherrytree/Interscope)
- Mura Masa
- Mustard (10 Summers/Interscope)
- My Life with the Thrill Kill Kult
- Mýa (University/Interscope)

=== N ===
- Natalia Kills (will.i.am/Cherrytree/KonLive/Interscope)
- Nate Dogg (Death Row/Interscope)
- Nelly Furtado (Mosley/Interscope)
- New Kids on the Block
- Nicole Scherzinger (RCA/Interscope)
- NO1-Noah

=== O ===
- Obie Trice (Shady/Interscope)
- Olivia (G-Unit/Interscope)
- OMG Girlz (Grand Hustle Records/Interscope)
- Ozzico (Geffen/Interscope)
- Outlawz

=== P ===
- Paper Tongues
- Paradiso Girls
- Parlè (Interscope/Ruff Ryders)
- Phantom Planet
- Pharrell Williams (Star Trak/Interscope)
- Phunk Junkeez
- Pia Toscano
- The Pipettes (Cherrytree/Interscope)
- Planet Asia
- Poorstacy (A&M/Interscope)
- The Pretty Reckless
- Prick
- Prima J (Geffen)
- Primus
- Pseudopod
- Pure Soul
- The Pussycat Dolls (A&M/Interscope)

=== Q ===
- Queens of the Stone Age

=== R ===
- Raekwon (Aftermath/Ice Water/Interscope)
- Rakim (Aftermath/Interscope)
- The Rasmus
- RBX (Death Row/Aftermath/Interscope)
- Red Café (Bad Boy/Interscope)
- Red Five
- Redfoo (will.i.am/Cherrytree/Interscope)
- Rema (Mavin/Jonzing/Interscope)
- Renforshort
- Rev Theory (DGC/Interscope)
- Reverend Horton Heat
- Rich Boy (Zone 4/Interscope)
- Rich the Kid (Rich Forever/Interscope)
- Richard Vission
- Rise Against
- Rivers Cuomo (DGC/Interscope)
- Rob Zombie (Geffen/Interscope)
- Robin Thicke (Star Trak/Interscope)
- Robyn (Konichiwa/Interscope)
- Rocket From the Crypt
- Rocko (A1/Interscope)
- The Rolling Stones (US)
- Rooney
- Rosanne Cash
- Rosé (inactive on solo releases since 2024)
- Ruff Ryders (Interscope/Ruff Ryders)
- Rufus Wainwright (DreamWorks/Geffen/Interscope)
- Rvssian
- Rye Rye
- Ryn Weaver (Mad Love/Interscope)
- Ryan Trey

=== S ===
- S Club (US)
- Sam Fender
- Scars on Broadway
- Sean "Diddy" Combs (Bad Boy/Interscope)
- Sebastian (Mosley Music Group/Interscope)
- Shenseea
- Sheryl Crow (A&M; under Interscope 1999–2011)
- The Shins
- Simian Mobile Disco (Wichita/Interscope)
- Sir Sly
- Skylar Grey (Kidinakorner/Interscope)
- Slaughterhouse (Shady/Interscope)
- Smash Mouth
- Snake River Conspiracy
- Snow Patrol (A&M/Interscope)
- Social Code
- Solange (Geffen)
- Sophie Ellis-Bextor
- Soulja Boy (Stacks On Deck/Interscope)
- Spike King (Geffen/Interscope)
- Space Cowboy (Southern Fried/Cherrytree/Interscope)
- Sparkle (Rockland/Interscope)
- Spensha Baker (A&M/Geffen/Interscope)
- Spinal Tap
- SpotemGottem (Rebel/Geffen/Interscope)
- Stat Quo (Aftermath/Shady/Interscope)
- Static Revenger
- Steve Angello
- Steve Aoki
- Still Woozy
- The Storm
- The Struts
- Stunna 4 Vegas (South Coast/Billion Dollar Baby/Interscope)
- Styles P (Ruff Ryders/Interscope)
- Sugababes
- Switches (US/Canada/Mexico)

=== T ===
- t.A.T.u. (T.A. Music/Interscope) (US)
- Taeyang (The Black Label/Interscope)
- Tainy
- Taking Back Sunday (Victory/Warner Bros./Interscope)
- Tamar Kaprelian
- Tame Impala
- Tay Money
- Teairra Mari
- Tech N9ne (Strange Music)
- Teriyaki Boyz (Star Trak/Interscope)
- Teyana Taylor (Star Trak/Interscope)
- Tha Dogg Pound (Death Row/Interscope)
- That Mexican OT
- Toadies
- Tokio Hotel (Cherrytree/Interscope) (US)
- Tokyo's Revenge (Blac Noize!/Cypress Park Music/Geffen/Interscope)
- Tom Jones
- Tommy Sparks (Island/Interscope)
- Tony Yayo (Interscope/G-Unit)
- Tory Lanez (One Umbrella/Mad Love/Interscope Records)
- Travis Garland
- TRUSTcompany (Geffen)
- Truth Hurts (Aftermath/Interscope)

=== U ===
- Unwritten Law

=== V ===
- Vado
- Van Halen
- Victoria (A&M/Interscope)

=== W ===
- Wale (Allido/Interscope)
- The Wallflowers
- Wax
- Waylon Wyatt (Darkroom/Interscope)
- Weezer (DGC/Interscope)
- Westside Boogie (Shady/Interscope)
- White Lies (Geffen/Interscope)
- The Who (US)
- Wifisfuneral (Alamo Records/Interscope)
- Will Smith (Overbrook/Interscope)
- will.i.am (will.i.am/Interscope)

=== X ===
- X Ambassadors (KIDinaKORNER/Interscope)

=== Y ===
- Yeah Yeah Yeahs (Dress Up/DGC/Interscope)
- Years & Years (Polydor/Interscope)
- Yeat (Geffen/Interscope)
- Young Buck (Cashville/G-Unit/Interscope)
- The Young Gods (Play It Again Sam/Interscope) (US)
- Yuksek
- Yung L.A. (Grand Hustle/Interscope)
- Yungblud (Geffen/Interscope)
