= Murder of Jessica Lunsford =

Murder and rape of young American girl

Jessica Lunsford
- Born: Jessica Marie Lunsford; October 6, 1995; Gastonia, North Carolina, U.S.
- Died: February 27, 2005 (aged 9); Homosassa, Florida, U.S.
- Cause of death: Murder by live burial
- Body discovered: March 19, 2005
- Parents: Mark Lunsford (father); Angela Bryant (mother)

Jessica Marie Lunsford (October 6, 1995 – February 27, 2005) was an American girl from Homosassa, Florida, who was murdered in February 2005 at the age of nine. Lunsford was abducted from her home in the early morning of February 24, 2005, by John Couey, a 46-year-old sex offender who lived nearby. Couey held her captive over the weekend, during which he raped and later murdered her by burying her alive. The media extensively covered the investigation and trial of Couey.

Jessica Lunsford's murder influenced the introduction of legislation in Florida known as Jessica's Law, designed to protect potential victims and reduce a sexual offender's ability to re-offend, which has since influenced similar legislation in 42 other states.

On August 24, 2007, a judge in Miami, Florida convicted Couey for the kidnapping, sexual battery, and first degree murder of Lunsford, and sentenced him to death. Couey died of natural causes in 2009.

== Investigation ==
Nine-year-old Jessica Lunsford disappeared in the night on February 24, 2005, from her home in Homosassa, Florida. After approximately three weeks of intense searching for her around the area of her home, John Evander Couey was arrested in Savannah, Georgia, for an outstanding warrant of cannabis possession, but was released after questioning because it was only a local warrant. Couey was a 46-year-old long-time resident of Homosassa with an extensive criminal record, listing dozens of arrests for burglary and was a convicted child sex offender. Due to the laws at the time, Couey received only short sentences and was not monitored after release, despite his record of being an experienced trespasser and his repeated sexual offenses against children.

On March 12, Couey was arrested in Augusta, Georgia, at the request of the Citrus County Sheriff's Office, for questioning about Jessica Lunsford's disappearance due to his residence on West Snowbird Court in Homosassa, only 65 yards from the Lunsfords' home, and his criminal record. Couey stated he did not have anything to do with the nine-year-old's disappearance and had moved to Georgia to find a job, only knowing about it from the television news. He was released from police custody after being interviewed.

On March 14, Couey's half-sister Dorothy Dixon gave permission to police to search her trailer at West Snowbird Court in Homosassa. Couey had lived at the West Snowbird Court residence with his half-sister Dixon, and with her boyfriend Matt Dittrich, her daughter and son–in-law Madie and Gene Secord, and her two-year-old grandson Joshua. During the search a blood-stained mattress and pillows were found in Couey's closet in his room, and forensic analysis discovered both Couey's and Lunsford's DNA on the mattress.

On March 17, Couey was arrested and charged with the murder of Jessica Lunsford, and transported to the Citrus County jail in Florida.

=== Couey's confession ===
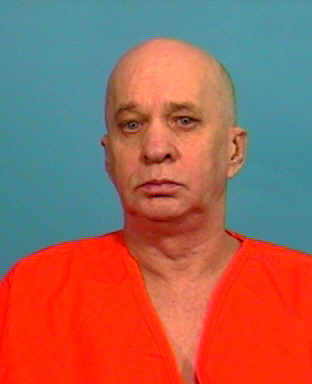
John Couey

On March 18, 2005, Couey made an audio-recorded and videotaped confession to having kidnapped, raped and murdered Lunsford.

In his confession, Couey said that he had previously seen Lunsford playing in her yard and thought she was "about six years old". On the night of the abduction, Couey had intended to just burglarize the Lunsfords' home, but saw Jessica and "acted on impulse and he took her". He entered Lunsford's house at about three o'clock in the morning through an unlocked door, awakened Lunsford, told her he was taking her to her father. At the time, he occupied a trailer along with two women, about 100 yards (91 m) away. Couey admitted to raping Lunsford in his bedroom, then three days later, tricked her into getting into two garbage bags by saying he was going to "take her home". He instead buried her alive, perhaps to prevent her from being a witness against him.

=== Discovery of Lunsford's body ===
On March 19, police found nine-year-old Jessica Lunsford's body at the residence on West Snowbird Court in Homosassa, buried in a plastic bag in a hole approximately 2.5 feet (0.76 m) deep and 2 feet (0.61 m) circular, covered with leaves. Lunsford's body was removed from the ground and transported to the coroner's office, where it was recorded to have undergone "moderate" to "severe" decomposition. According to the publicly released autopsy reports, Lunsford had poked two fingers through the bags before suffocating to death, and the fingers had skeletonized. The coroner ruled that death would have happened even in best circumstances within 2–3 minutes from lack of oxygen.

After the discovery of Lunsford's body at the residence, Dixon stated that a week earlier she had given Couey money for a bus ticket, and that he had telephoned her to say he had moved to Savannah, Georgia. Additionally, Dixon and the other residents of the trailer claimed to have never seen Lunsford at the home or noticed anything strange from Couey's room, which had not been used since he was last there.

On June 30, 2006, a judge ruled that Couey's confession was inadmissible in court because when it was recorded police had not granted Couey's requests for a lawyer, thereby rendering the confession invalid and unreliable under the Fifth and Sixth Amendments of the United States Constitution. Over Couey's objection, the trial court ruled that all evidence collected after the confession, including the recovery of Lunsford's body, would be admitted, as would incriminating statements allegedly made by Couey to investigators and a jail guard.

== Conviction ==
=== Criminal proceedings ===
The trial was moved to Miami after officials were unable to seat an impartial jury in Citrus County where the trial was first scheduled to be held.

On March 7, 2007, Couey was found guilty of all charges in relation to Lunsford's death, including first degree murder, kidnapping, burglary with assault or battery upon any person, and capital sexual battery. The jury deliberated for four hours, tasked with recommending either life in prison without the possibility of parole or the death penalty, the only two possible sentences available under Florida law. A week later, after about one hour and 15 minutes of deliberation, a jury recommended Couey be put to death. The case was appealed to the Florida Supreme Court.

On August 11, 2007, a jury overseeing the Lunsford case voted 10-2 that Couey be eligible for the death sentence. Defense for Couey argued that he had suffered from a lifetime of emotional abuse and had a below normal IQ, which would enable him to avoid a death sentence under a 2002 Supreme Court ruling prohibiting the execution of mentally handicapped people. However, the most credible intelligence test rated Couey's IQ at 78, above the standard accepted level of intellectual disability, which is 70.

On August 24, 2007, Couey was sentenced to death, in addition to three consecutive life sentences. On September 30, 2009, Couey died of natural causes.

== Aftermath ==
=== Jessica Lunsford Act ===
Following her death, her father, Mark Lunsford, pursued new legislation to provide more stringent tracking of released sex offenders. The Jessica Lunsford Act was named after her. It requires tighter restrictions on sex offenders (such as wearing electronic tracking devices) and increased prison sentences for some convicted sex offenders. "Jessica's Law" refers to similar reform acts initiated by other states.

=== Wrongful death and negligence lawsuit ===
On February 19, 2008, almost three years to the day after her kidnapping and murder, Jessica's father, Mark Lunsford was represented by Jacksonville, Florida lawyers in a pre-trial brief filed against the Citrus County Sheriff's Office and the Florida Department of Law Enforcement. After receiving notice of the pending suit, Citrus County Sheriff Jeff Dawsy stated that he believed the case to be "baseless... There is only one person in the world that should be held responsible for Jessica Lunsford's death and that's John Couey."

Following complaints from Citrus County residents, Mark Lunsford and attorneys Eric Block and Mark Gelman held a news conference stating that the pending litigation was "not for the money... but for change," with Lunsford calling for changes to be made to procedures and policies. The suit alleged that Citrus County officals had mishandled the investigation by ignoring evidence that pointed to Jessica's location, actively pursued Jessica's father as a suspect without evidence, and failing to act on Couey's outstanding warrant, which could have led the officials to Couey sooner.

== Legacy ==
The Citrus County Children's Advocacy Center, was founded in August 2006, and known as Jessie's Place, in honor of Jessica Lunsford. In November 2022, The Punishers Law Enforcement Motorcycle Club (LEMC) donated $8,000 to the center.

== Other media ==
Mark Lunsford becoming an activist for children's rights after the murder of his daughter Jessica is the subject of the 2011 documentary film, Jessie's Dad.

The abduction of Jessica Lunsford was covered in 2013 on the TV series FBI: Criminal Pursuit in the episode "Lurking Menace".

The abduction and murder was covered in 2024 on the TV series People Magazine Investigates in the episode "The Boogeyman."
