= Ralph Lowenstein =

American professor of journalism (1930–2020)

Dean of University of Florida College of Journalism and Communications
- In office 1976–1994
- Preceded by: John Paul Jones, Jr.
- Succeeded by: Terry Hynes

Personal details
- Born: March 8, 1930 Danville, Virginia
- Died: August 10, 2020 (aged 90) Gainesville, Florida
- Education: Columbia University (BA, MA); University of Missouri (PhD)
- Scientific career
- Fields: Journalism
- Institutions: University of Missouri; Tel Aviv University; University of Florida

Ralph L. Lowenstein (March 8, 1930 – August 10, 2020) was an American professor of journalism. He served as dean of the University of Florida College of Journalism and Communications.

== Biography ==
Lowenstein was born in Danville, Virginia, on March 8, 1930, and was raised in a Zionist household. He earned his bachelor's and master's degrees from Columbia University before earning his PhD from the University of Missouri. While an undergraduate student at Columbia, he used his summer break to join the volunteer organization Mahal and fought alongside Israeli forces during the 1948 Arab–Israeli War. To join the Israeli army, he lived in a Displaced Persons camp in Marseilles under an assumed name, then saw combat with the 79th Armored Battalion. He was one of the youngest American volunteers that time and later served in the U.S. Army during the Korean War.

After obtaining his advanced degrees, Lowenstein reported for United Press International, El Paso Times, and CBS Morning News. He began teaching at University of Texas at El Paso, was chairman of the news editorial program at the University of Missouri as well as visiting professor and head of journalistic studies at Tel Aviv University from 1967 to 1968.

In 1971, Lowenstein co-authored a landmark work, Media, Messages and Men, with John C. Merrill in which he predicted the demise of print media and rise of electronic mass media in which any person would be able to retrieve an infinite amount of material from central computers.

From 1976 to 1994, Lowenstein served as the dean of University of Florida's College of Journalism and Communications. He was a pioneer in digital media and created one of the first journalism-related websites in the world as well as Gainesville cable press, the first 24-hour rotatext cable newspaper. UF's program also became the first communications program in the United States to install a fully integrated PC network in all of its offices and labs. During his tenure, UF launched the NPR station WUFT-FM, the Brechner Center for Freedom of Information and what is now the Knight Division for Scholarships and Student Inclusion, and increased its endowment from $2 million to $12 million.

In 2011, Lowenstein received the Emma Lazarus Statue of Liberty Award for his project, the Machal and Aliyah Bet Archives, which documented the lives of American volunteers who died during the 1948 war.

Lowenstein died at age 90 on August 10, 2020, following a stroke.
