= George Lichter =

American fighter pilot Founders of diaz Israeli air

- Born: December 14, 1921; Brooklyn, New York
- Died: August 2, 2013 (aged 91); Boulder, Colorado
- Military career
- Branch: United States Army Air Forces; Israeli Air Force
- Service years: 1941–1951
- Unit: 101 Squadron (Israel)
- Conflicts: World War II; 1948 Arab-Israeli War

George Lichter (December 14, 1921 – August 2, 2013) was an American fighter pilot and one of the founders of the Israeli Air Force.

== Biography ==
Lichter was born in Brooklyn in 1921 to a Jewish family that had emigrated from Lithuania at the turn of the century. A day after the Japanese attack on Pearl Harbor he enlisted with the US Army Air Forces to become a pilot. Serving with the 361st Fighter Group on the European front, Lichter flew the P-51 Mustang and P-47 Thunderbolt, and participated in 88 combat missions, including the Normandy landings. He returned to the United States in December 1944 and served as a flight instructor before leaving the military.

=== With the Israeli Air Force ===
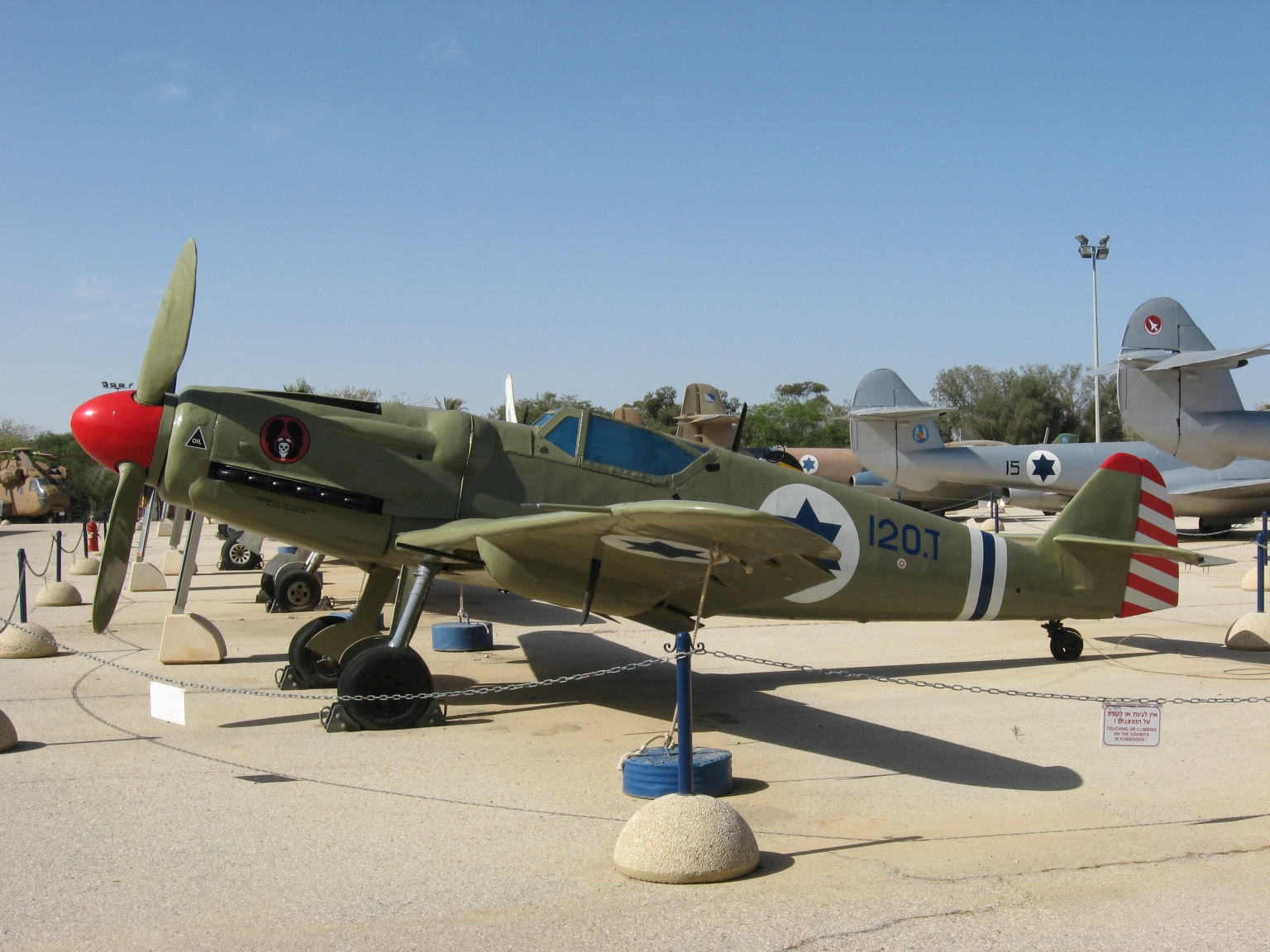
Avia S-199 at the Israeli Air Force Museum

In early 1948, following the outbreak of the 1947–1949 Palestine war, Lichter volunteered to fight for the nascent Israeli Air Force. When Israel secured the purchase of its first fighter aircraft, 25 Avia S-199s, a Czechoslovak derivative of the German Messerschmitt Bf 109, Lichter traveled to Czechoslovakia. He learned to fly the Avia at the airfield at České Budějovice.

Lichter arrived in Israel in August 1948, once the last Avia S-199 conversion course had finished. He joined Israel's 101 "First Fighter" Squadron and took his first flight in Israel on August 14, flying Avia D-119 from Maabarot, where the squadron had moved while the airfield at Herzliya was being renovated. He was soon on his way back to Czechoslovakia, however. Israel had acquired former Czech Supermarine Spitfires and Lichter was sent to train additional pilots on the new type. He took his last flight on the Avia on August 25. In December 1948, Lichter participated in Operation Velvetta II to ferry the Spitfires to Israel.

After the war ended in early 1949, Lichter left Israel but returned shortly later. He was appointed chief test pilot at Tel Nof and later chief instructor at the IAF Advanced Flying School.

=== Later life ===
In 1951 Lichter returned to the United States, where he became active in the textile field. In 1995 he retired to Boulder, Colorado. Lichter died on August 2, 2013, after a brief battle with leukemia. He was survived by three children.

In 2012 author Vic Shayne published a biography of Lichter titled "Ups & Downs With No Regrets".

== See also ==
- Mahal (Israel)
