= Mitchell Flint =

American lawyer

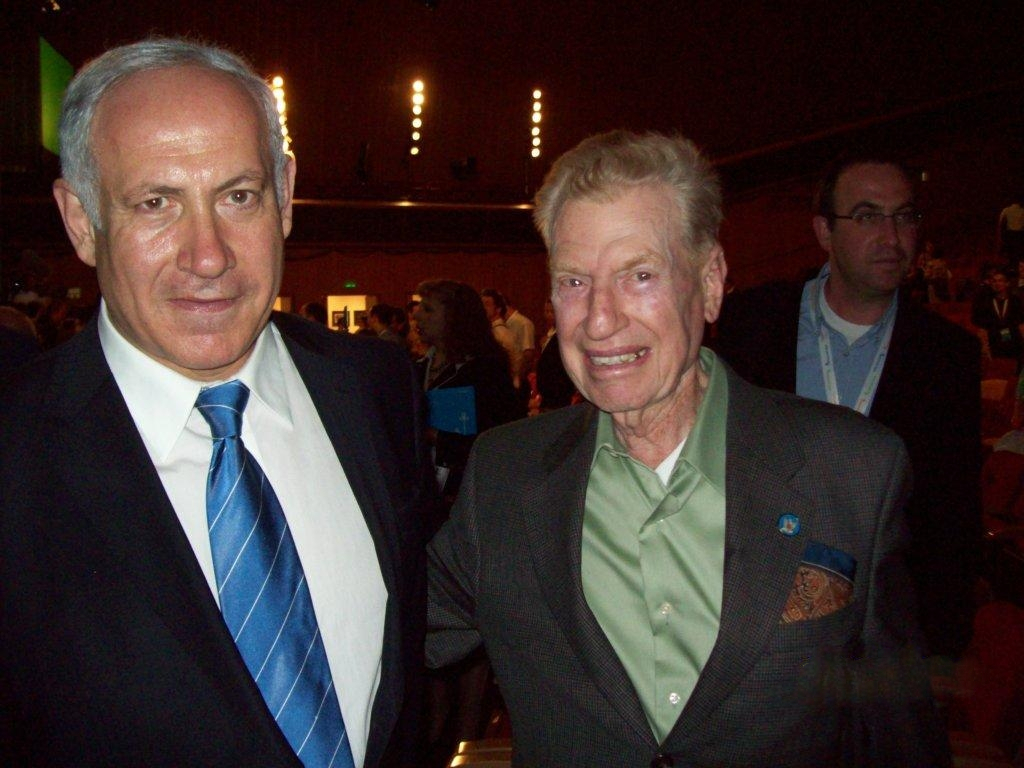
- Israeli Prime Minister Benjamin Netanyahu and 101 Squadron veteran Mitchell Flint -- May 5, 2008 Jerusalem
- Born: June 27, 1923; Kansas City, Missouri, U.S.
- Died: September 16, 2017 (aged 94); Los Angeles, California, U.S.

Mitchell Flint (June 27, 1923 – September 16, 2017) was an American lawyer and veteran aviator. He was a United States Navy fighter pilot during World War II, and later served as an American volunteer pilot in Israel's first fighter squadron during the 1948 Arab–Israeli War. Mitchell Flint was credited as one of the people who assisted in the creation of the Israeli Air Force.

Mitchell Flint was born in 1923 in Kansas City, Missouri. His father Harry worked for the Pendergast political machine. Harry was a decorated American fighter pilot during World War I and helped develop then-teenager Mitchell's lifelong love of flying at Kansas City's original airfield.

Flint graduated from Westport High School in Kansas City, where he took part in the school's Junior Reserve Officers' Training Corps, graduating with honors. He volunteered at age 18 to serve as a naval fighter pilot in World War II. Following his successful completion of the Civilian Pilot Training Program, Flint served in the Pacific Theater on the naval air carrier, the USS Wasp, under Admiral John S. McCain Sr.

Flint performed dive bombing missions in the Pacific while flying the Vought F4U Corsair fighter aircraft. He shot down a kamikaze and was ultimately awarded three Air Medals. After six years of service in the Navy, he continued flying for sixteen years in the United States Navy Reserve, ultimately achieving the rank of commander.

Concerned for the plight of Europe's Holocaust Survivors in the aftermath of World War II, Flint volunteered as an American fighter pilot in Israel's first aviation unit - 101 Squadron. He served under Commander Modi Alon and flew alongside Ezer Weizman, the country's future president, during the 1948 Arab-Israeli War. Flint may be the only pilot in history to fly the Corsair, Avia S-199, North American P-51 Mustang, and Supermarine Spitfire in wartime combat. Flint attended, and along with other Arab-Israeli War volunteers, was saluted for his efforts at Israel's Silver Anniversary in 1979, and again in 1999, at Israel's Golden Anniversary.

Flint lived in Los Angeles, where he earned his law degree from UCLA, and had a family law practice for over fifty years. At the time of his death he was married to Joyce Flint, a former fashion designer-turned conservator, and had two sons, Michael, a film producer in Hollywood, and Guy, an educator. He also served as a Co-Director for Machal West, an organization composed of American Veterans who fought with Israel in the 1948 Arab–Israeli War. He co-founded the organization.
