= Modi Alon =

Israeli fighter pilot (1921–1948)

Mordechai "Modi" Alon
- מרדכי "מודי" אלון
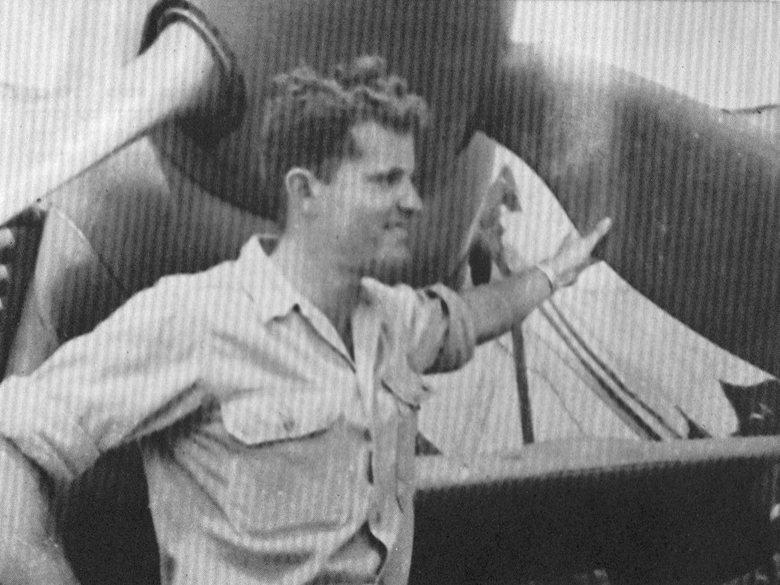
- Born: 17 January 1921; Safed, British Mandate for Palestine
- Died: 16 October 1948 (aged 27); Herzliya Airport, Israel
- Burial place: Nahalat Yitzhack Cemetery, Tel Aviv
- Military career
- Allegiance: United Kingdom (1940–1945); Israel (1948)
- Branch: Royal Air Force (1940–1945); Israeli Air Force (1948)
- Service years: 1940–1948
- Rank: Lieutenant Colonel
- Commands: 101 Squadron
- Conflicts: World War II; 1948 Arab-Israeli War †

Mordechai "Modi" Alon (Hebrew: מרדכי "מודי" אלון; 17 January 1921 – 16 October 1948) was an Israeli fighter pilot who with the formation of the Israeli Air Force in May 1948, assumed command of its first fighter squadron. Flying the Avia S-199, Alon participated in the IAF's first combat sortie on 29 May 1948, and on 3 June scored the IAF's very first aerial victories, downing a pair of Royal Egyptian Air Force C-47s over Tel Aviv.

== Biography ==
Mordechai Alon was born in Safed on 17 January 1921, to Yaacov and Naomi Kalibansky, pioneers of the Second Aliyah. The family moved around several times before finally settling in Tel Aviv, where Alon studied at the Herzliya Hebrew Gymnasium while secretly enlisting in the Haganah. After graduating Alon went off to Kibbutz Degania Alef and in 1938 was among the founding members of Hanita.

=== RAF service ===
In 1940 Alon enlisted in the Royal Air Force, heeding calls by the Jewish Agency for Israel for the Jews in Palestine to support the British war effort. Denied the chance to train as a fighter pilot, in November 1940 Alon was sent to Egypt and attended the RAF's Wireless Operators course in Ismailia, qualifying as a Ground Wireless Operator.

Persisting in RAF service, in August 1943 Alon was finally allowed to undertake RAF flight training. He began his training in Rhodesia on 24 November 1943, graduating on 22 December 1944. He was then assigned to Cairo as a pilot. In May 1945 he was transferred to Italy, where he served as a P-51 Mustang pilot. In August 1945, Alon was posted to an RAF squadron flying P-51 Mustangs out of RAF Ramat David. Amid growing tensions between British mandatory authorities and the Yishuv, the RAF transferred Alon to Cairo. Alon quit the RAF shortly thereafter. On 31 January 1946, he returned to Palestine, where he enrolled at the Technion, studying architecture. In February 1947, Alon was arrested after interfering with the detention of illegal Jewish immigrants from the Aliyah Bet ship Haim Arlosoroff at Bat Galim, Haifa. He had challenged a British soldier who had been arresting illegal immigrants to fight him without a weapon and then subdued him. Alon was charged with assaulting a soldier but acquitted after the judge found that the soldier having put aside his weapon meant that it was a sporting fight.

=== Sherut Avir and birth of the Israeli Air Force ===
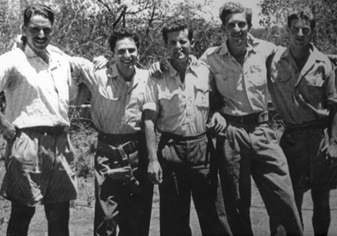
Modi Alon with fellow pilots; Syd Cohen, Giddy Lichtman, Ezer Weizman, and Arine Ruch in 1948.

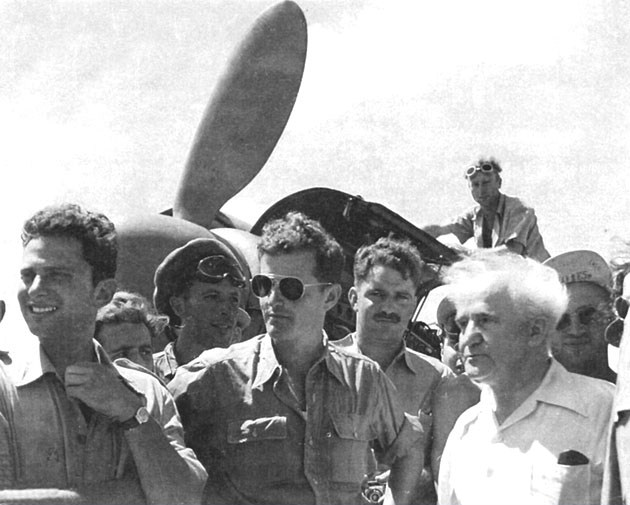
Alon (center) with David Ben-Gurion during the Prime Minister's visit to 101 Squadron, 1948

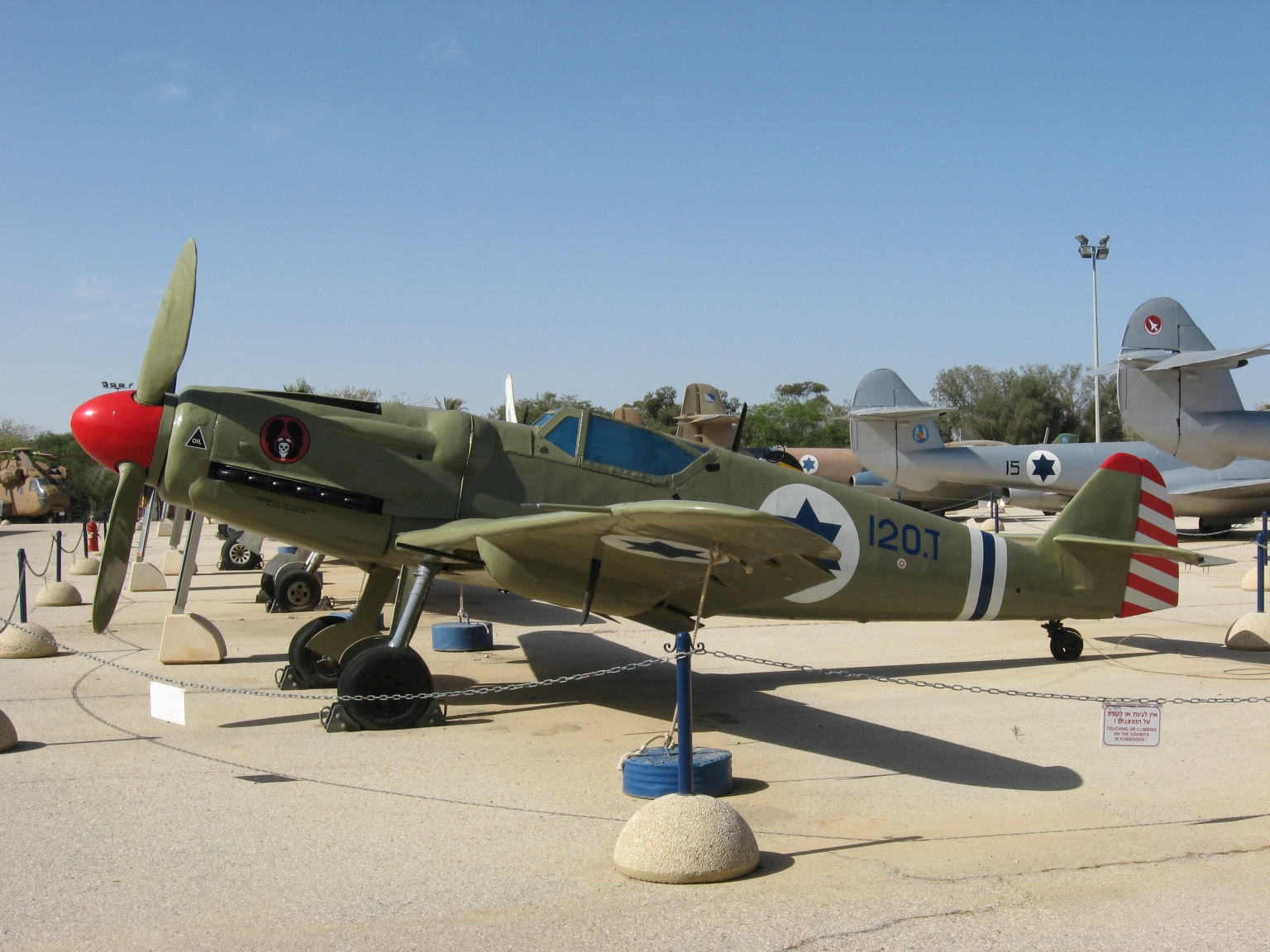
Avia S-199 at the Israeli Air Force Museum in Hatzerim

With the adoption of the United Nations Partition Plan for Palestine in November 1947, fighting erupted and Alon discontinued his studies. He enlisted with the Sherut Avir, the Haganah's nascent air service operating a collection of light aircraft, and in March 1948 was assigned command of its Tel Aviv Squadron. Sherut Avir pilots were employed flying reconnaissance missions, supplied besieged and isolated settlements, escorted convoys and even occasionally participated in fighting. On 27–28 March Alon flew a number of bombing sorties in support of the beleaguered Nebi Daniel Convoy which had attempted to break the siege of Gush Etzion and was under attack by Arab irregulars. He also served as a liaison officer between the Sherut Avir and Jewish ground forces during April's Operation Nachshon, aimed at breaking the siege of Jerusalem.

With the end of the British Mandate for Palestine fast approaching, the Yishuv sought to bolster its capabilities for the inevitable clash with Israel's Arab neighbors and their regular armies. It therefore secured the purchase of 25 Avia S-199s, a Czechoslovak derivative of the German Messerschmitt Bf 109. Alon was in the first batch of Sherut Avir pilots sent to fly the new aircraft, and departed Sde Dov on 6 May 1948. He was soon flying the Avia at the Czechoslovak airfield at České Budějovice. On 15 May, however, Israel declared its independence and found itself under immediate attack, including aerial strikes undertaken by the relatively powerful Royal Egyptian Air Force. Although they had not undergone any sort of gunnery training on the new aircraft, the pilots demanded to return home. On 20 May, therefore, Alon and fellow pilots boarded a Douglas C-54B for the return flight to Israel.

On 29 May the fledgling Israeli Air Force officially formed 101 Squadron, its first fighter squadron. Modi Alon was given command of the squadron, although Lou Lenart, a World War II veteran of fighting in the Pacific, was to command it in the air. The squadron had received its first Avia on the night of 20–21 May 1948, and by 29 May, four aircraft had been secretly assembled in a hangar at Ekron. The IAF had intended to reveal the Israeli acquisition of fighter aircraft with an attack on the Egyptian air base at El Arish, but the desperate situation on the southern front, with an Egyptian column heading towards Tel Aviv, prompted a change of plans. Without their engines having been run before or their guns fired, Lenart, Alon, Ezer Weizman and Eddie Cohen took off late in the afternoon to attack Egyptian forces near Isdud, only about 10 miles away. Each dropped two bombs and strafed the enemy column. The aircraft inflicted only slight damage, losing one Avia S-199 and pilot (Cohen) to ground fire. Alon's aircraft was also damaged upon landing, but the sortie nevertheless bought Israeli forces enough time to halt the Egyptian advance.

=== First kills ===
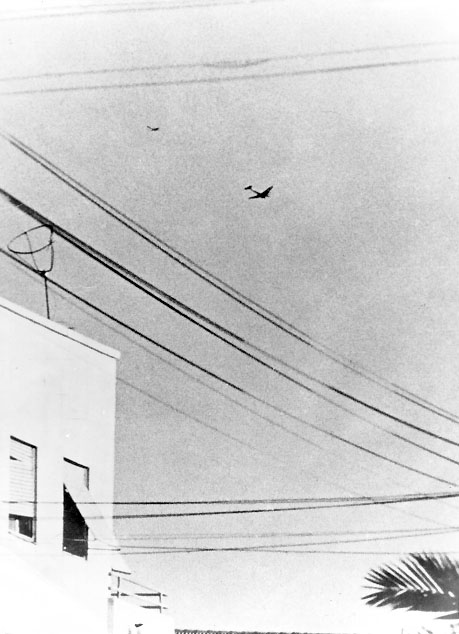
Modi Alon's Avia S-199 pursuing an Egyptian Dakota over Tel Aviv, 3 June 1948

Only one Avia S-199 (probably D-106) was serviceable on 3 June 1948, when a pair of Egyptian C-47s and their two Spitfire escorts returned for their 16th bombing of Tel Aviv. Dozens of civilians had been killed in previous raids, and flying the IAF's sole combat aircraft, Alon engaged the four Egyptian aircraft. Swinging out to sea to get the sun behind him, Alon evaded the Spitfires and then pursued and shot down both bombers, scoring the first aerial victories of the Israeli Air Force. The event took place in sight of the astonished populace which was not aware of the existence of an Israeli fighter arm. The air force held a press conference which Alon attended, and its headquarters was subsequently flooded with gifts including flowers, chocolate, and alcohol for the pilot despite the wartime scarcity of such luxuries. Although Tel Aviv would yet witness raids by Egyptian fighter aircraft, no bombers were ever to appear over the city again.

Lou Lenart left the squadron in early July, leaving Alon in sole command. In the early evening of 18 July Alon scored his third victory, when a formation of three Avias returning from a ground attack mission encountered a pair of REAF Spitfire Mk. VCs. Alon maneuvered behind one of the Spitfires to down Wing Commander Said Afifi al-Janzuri.

In late September 1948 Alon participated in Operation Velvetta, ferrying Czechoslovak Spitfires to Israel. Alon and fellow pilot Boris Senior burned too much of their fuel during one leg of the flight and were forced to land in Maritsa, Rhodes. The aircraft were impounded but both men released.

=== Death ===
At 16:58 on 16 October 1948, Alon and Ezer Weizman took off from Herzliya to attack Egyptian forces operating in the vicinity of Isdud, not far from where both had participated in the squadron's combat debut in May. Returning to base, Alon had trouble lowering the plane's landing gear and consequently began flying violent maneuvers to try and force the wheels to lower. The Avia's engine started streaming white smoke and the aircraft began losing altitude before hitting the ground and bursting into flames, instantly killing Alon. He was survived by his wife, Mina, three months pregnant at the time. Alon's daughter, Michal, would later serve her mandatory IDF service with 101 Squadron.

On 25 October, soon after Alon's death, the airfield at St. Jean, home to the IAF Flight Academy, was renamed "Camp Alon" in his honor. When the academy moved to Kfar Sirkin (former RAF Petah Tikva) in 1949, so did the name. The Tel Aviv neighborhood of Ramat HaTayasim (Hebrew: רמת הטייסים, lit. Pilots' Heights), established during the 1950s, was named after three fallen pilots renowned for their defense of the city – Modi Alon, Matityahu Sukenik and Aharon David Sprinzak. The latter two were killed on 4 June 1948, attacking an Egyptian flotilla off the Tel Aviv coast while flying a Fairchild Argus. A memorial to the three stands in a local public garden.

== See also ==
- Gordon Levett
- George Beurling
- Bob Vickman
