= Yom Kippur War atrocities =

War crimes during the 1973 Arab–Israeli War

War-related transgressions by the belligerents of the 1973 Yom Kippur War were referred to as atrocities.

== Syrian atrocities ==
Syria ignored the Geneva Conventions and many Israeli prisoners of war were tortured or killed. Advancing Israeli forces, re-capturing land taken by the Syrians early in the war, came across the bodies of 28 Israeli soldiers who had been blindfolded with their hands bound and summarily executed. In a December 1973 address to the National Assembly, Syrian Defense Minister Mustafa Tlass stated that he had awarded one soldier the Medal of the Republic for killing 28 Israeli prisoners with an axe, decapitating three of them and eating the flesh of one of his victims.

The Syrians employed brutal interrogation techniques utilizing electric shocks to the genitals. A number of Israeli soldiers taken prisoner on Mount Hermon were executed. Near the village of Hushniye, the Syrians captured 11 administrative personnel from the Golan Heights Force, all of whom were later found dead, blindfolded, and with their hands tied behind their backs. Within Hushniye, seven Israeli prisoners were found dead, and another three were executed at Tel Zohar. Syrian prisoners who fell into Israeli captivity confirmed that their comrades killed IDF prisoners.

A soldier from the Moroccan contingent fighting with Syrian forces was found to be carrying a sack filled with the body parts of Israeli soldiers which he intended to take home as souvenirs. The bodies of Israeli prisoners who were killed were stripped of their uniforms and found clad only in their underpants, and Syrian soldiers removed their dog tags to make identification of the bodies more difficult.

Some Israeli POWs reported having their fingernails ripped out while others were described as being turned into human ashtrays as their Syrian guards burned them with lit cigarettes. A report submitted by the chief medical officer of the Israeli army notes that, "the vast majority of (Israeli) prisoners were exposed during their imprisonment to severe physical and mental torture. The usual methods of torture were beatings aimed at various parts of the body, electric shocks, wounds deliberately inflicted on the ears, burns on the legs, suspension in painful positions and other methods."

Following the conclusion of hostilities, Syria would not release the names of prisoners it was holding to the International Committee of the Red Cross and in fact, did not even acknowledge holding any prisoners despite the fact they were publicly exhibited by the Syrians for television crews. The Syrians, having been thoroughly defeated by Israel, were attempting to use their captives as their sole bargaining chip in the post-war negotiations. One of the most famous Israeli POWs was Avraham Lanir, an Israeli pilot who bailed out over Syria and was taken prisoner. Lanir died under Syrian interrogation. When his body was returned in 1974, it exhibited signs of torture.

== Egyptian war crimes ==
Israeli historian Aryeh Yitzhaki estimated that the Egyptians killed about 200 Israeli soldiers who had surrendered. Yitzhaki based his claim on army documents. In addition, dozens of Israeli prisoners were beaten and otherwise mistreated in Egyptian captivity.

Individual Israeli soldiers gave testimony of witnessing comrades killed after surrendering to the Egyptians, or seeing the bodies of Israeli soldiers found blindfolded with their hands tied behind their backs. Avi Yaffe, a radioman serving on the Bar-Lev Line, reported hearing calls from other soldiers that the Egyptians were killing anyone who tried to surrender, and also obtained recordings of soldiers who were saved from Egyptian firing squads.

Issachar Ben-Gavriel, an Israeli soldier who was captured at the Suez Canal, claimed that out of his group of 19 soldiers who surrendered, 11 were shot dead. Another soldier claimed that a soldier in his unit was captured alive but beaten to death during interrogation. Photographic evidence of such executions exists, though some of it has never been made public. Photos were also found of Israeli prisoners who were photographed alive in Egyptian captivity, but were returned to Israel dead.

The order to kill Israeli prisoners came from General Shazly, who, in a pamphlet distributed to Egyptian soldiers immediately before the war, advised his troops to kill Israeli soldiers even if they surrendered.

In 2013, the Israeli government declassified documents detailing Egyptian atrocities against prisoners of war, recording the deaths of at least 86 Israeli POWs at the hands of Egyptian forces. In an interview Israeli major general Herzl Shafir recalled instances of these accounts, including that of an injured prisoner who was murdered when an Egyptian doctor "disconnected him from the oxygen and kept him from getting an intravenous drip." He noted that statistics on the number of people killed was still unclear.
