= 101 Squadron (Israel) =

Israeli military unit

- טייסת הקרב הראשונה
- Active: May 20, 1948 – Present
- Country: Israel
- Branch: Israeli Air Force
- Role: Air Defence
- Garrison/HQ: Ramat David Airbase
- Nickname: First Fighter Squadron

Commanders
- Notable commanders: Modi Alon; Yosef Alon; Avraham Lanir

Aircraft flown
- Fighter: F-16C

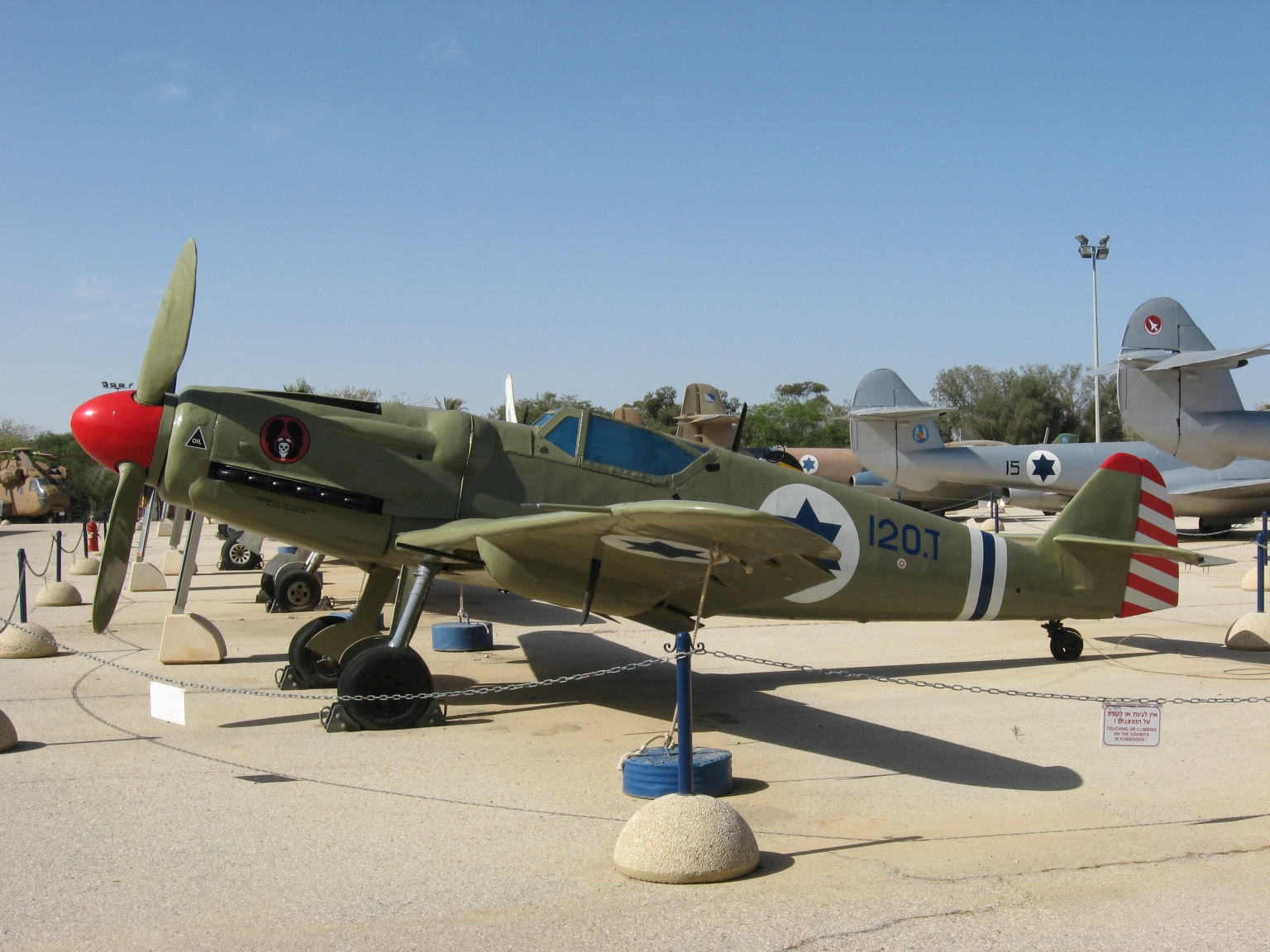
An Avia S-199 with the 101 Squadron badge

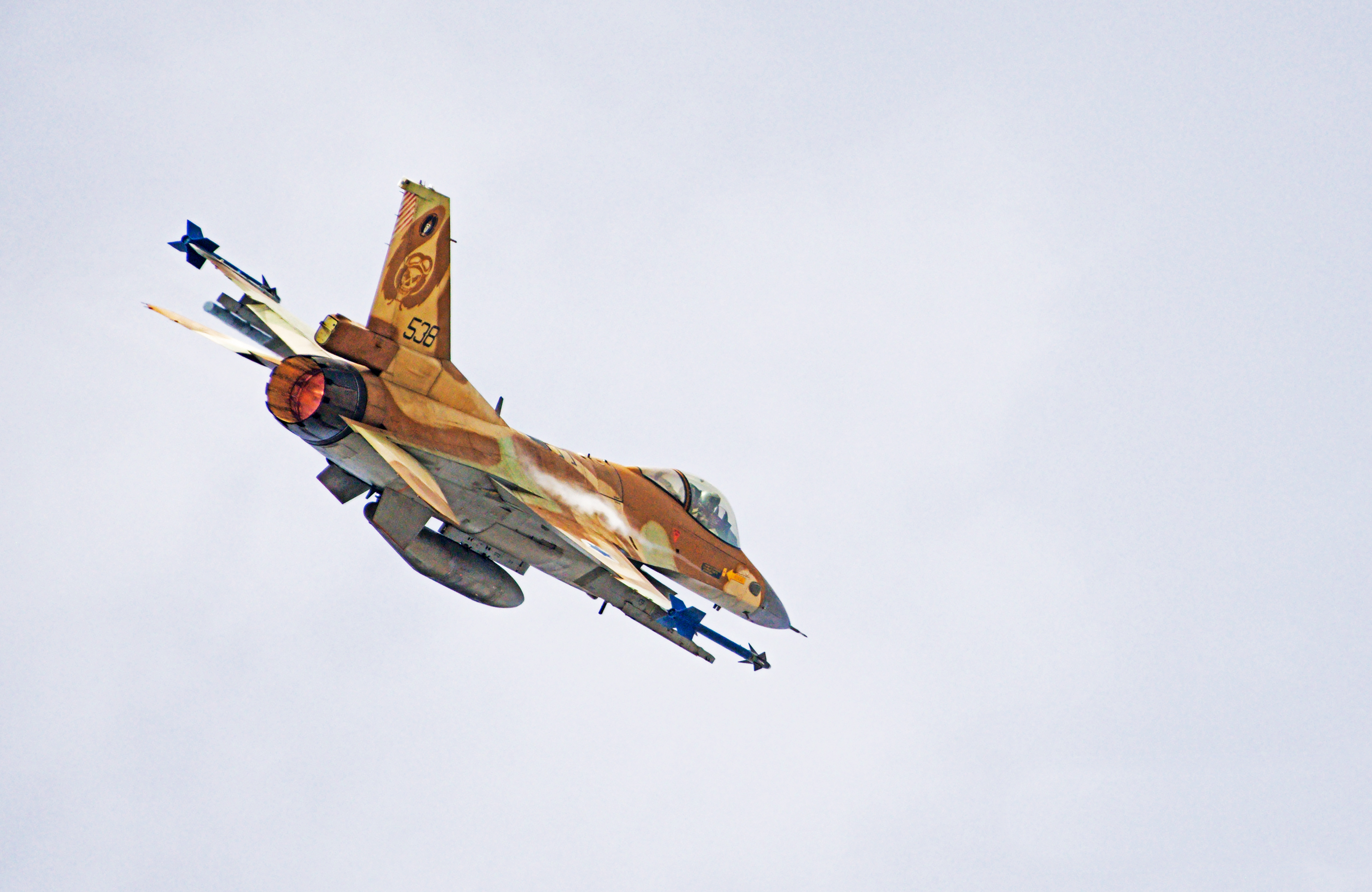
Barak 2020-F-16C aircraft of the 'First Fighter' squadron in the Israeli Air Force

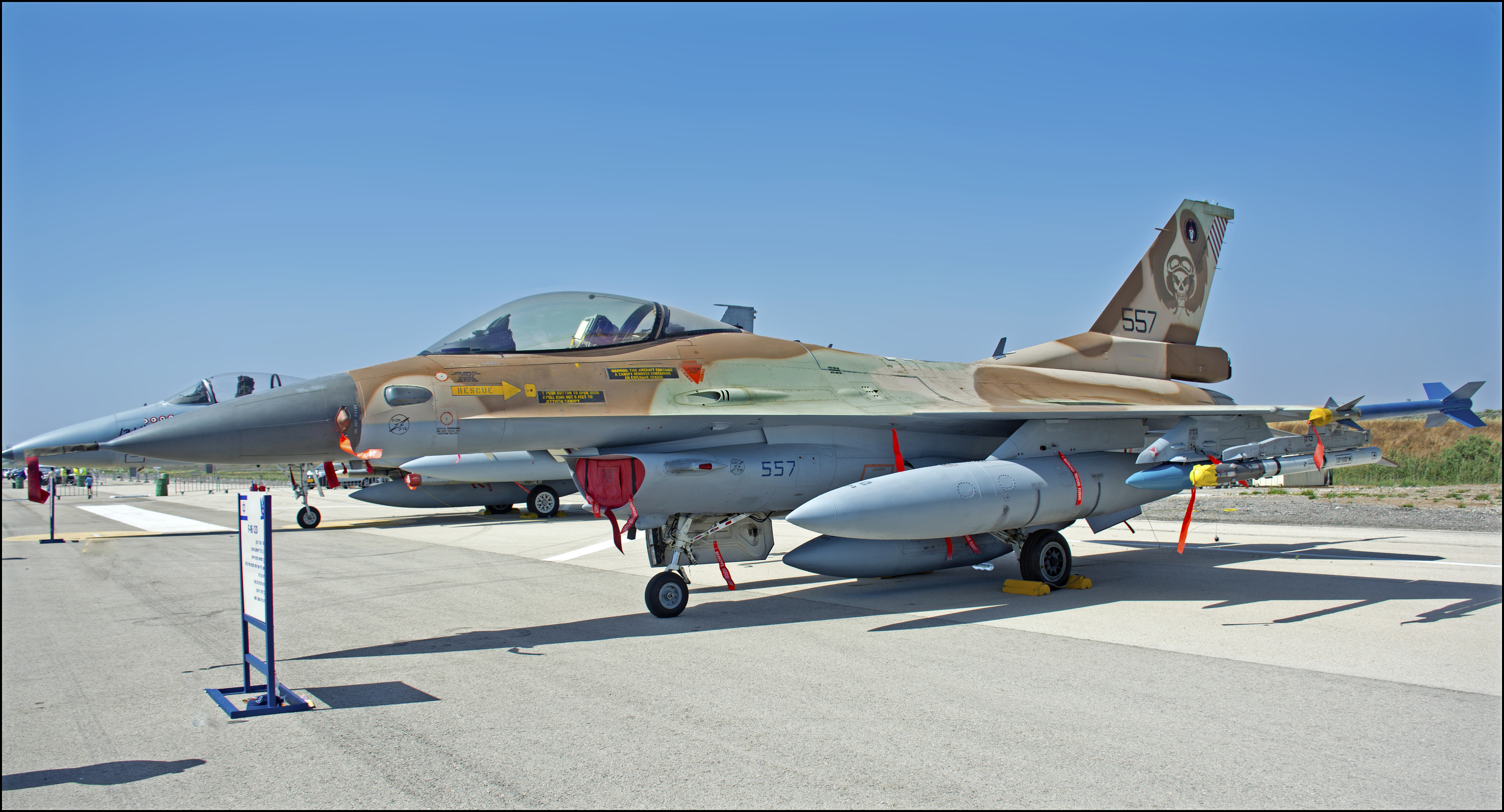
The F-16C Barak 2020 aircraft of Squadron 101 in the Independence Day display.

101 Squadron of the Israeli Air Force (IAF), also known as the First Fighter Squadron, operates F-16C Fighting Falcon Barak II out of Ramat David Airbase.

== History ==
101 Squadron is Israel's first fighter squadron, formed on 20 May 1948, six days after Israel declared its independence. Initially flying the Avia S-199, it has since operated the Supermarine Spitfire, North American Mustang, Dassault Mystere IV, Dassault Mirage IIICJ, IAI Nesher and IAI Kfir.

101 Squadron was formed at two air bases simultaneously: IAF Ekron, former RAF Aqir, currently Tel Nof Airbase, and Žatec, code-named "Zebra", in northwestern Czechoslovakia, a former Luftwaffe airfield close to a Messerschmitt production facility. Pilots received initial flight training on the Avia S-199s, Czechoslovak-built copies of the Bf 109G with 1,320 hp Junkers Jumo 211F powerplants. During one ferry flight some of the squadron's 15 aircraft were forced to land in Greece, and were immediately impounded. During the next ferry-flight a C-46 was used as a navigation guide, and a corvette was readied off the coast in case any aircraft had to be ditched and pilots rescued from the water.

Four of these flew the squadron's first mission on 29 May 1948, strafing the Egyptian ground forces near Ad Halom, in the prelude to Operation Pleshet. 101 Squadron was responsible for the Israeli Air Force's first aerial victories on 3 June 1948, when Modi Alon, after taking off from Herzliya Airport, shot down a pair of Royal Egyptian Air Force C-47s which had just bombed Tel Aviv.

A makeshift strip located around the current Herzliya Airport was the main operating base of the squadron between June and October 1948, and the squadron moved to it after un-assembled planes were strafed on the ground on 30 May. The airfield was used as it was some distance behind the front lines, and was clandestine. It was a purpose built strip that was constructed after the beginning of hostilities in between the orange orchards around Herzliya, and did not appear on published maps.

During these initial operations, the squadron operated with a few planes in the face of the Arab forces' near-Air supremacy and the airplanes were dispersed between the orange trees when parked. The squadron was moved in October to Hatzor Airbase from the strip in due to its unsuitability in rainy conditions, probable loss of clandestine status, fluidity of the front lines which made former British bases safe for use, and a shift in the balance of air superiority towards the Israelis. In 2021 the squadron relocated from Hatzor Airbase to Ramat David Airbase alongside the 105 Squadron.

== Pilots ==
- Yosef Alon
- Giora Epstein
- Israel Baharav
- Aaron "Red" Finkel
- Mitchell Flint
- Avi Lanir
- Gordon Levett
- Christopher Magee
- Milton Rubenfeld
- Iftach Spector
- Bob Vickman
- Ezer Weizman
- George Lichter
- Gideon Lichtman
