= Bob Vickman =

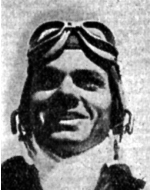
- Bob Vickman
- Born: November 21, 1921; Los Angeles, California, U.S.
- Died: July 9, 1948 (missing in action)
- Buried: Unknown
- Allegiance: United States Army Air Forces; Israel Defense Forces

Robert Vickman (November 21, 1921 – July 9, 1948) was an American pilot and one of the first pilots in the Israeli Air Force. He died on active service in the 1948 Arab–Israeli War.

== Family ==
Bob Vickman was the son of Morde and Elsie Vickman. The Vickman family were Russian Jewish immigrants to the United States who arrived c. 1905. The Vickmans originally settled in Chicago. Bob's dad Morde and his brother Abe moved to Los Angeles, California area. Morde and Elsie had three sons: Harry was the oldest, Bob the middle son, and Ted the youngest. Morde went into the restaurant business in 1930 creating the restaurant known as Vickman's feed bag. See Margaret Engel's article in the Washington Post. Bob's older brother Harry took over the restaurant after Morde died. Bob had not married and left no kids. There are numerous cousins in California, Chicago and various other parts of the U.S.

== Schooling ==
Vickman attended John Marshall High School in Los Angeles and earned a B.S. degree in Business Administration from UCLA, studying from 1942 to 1945.

== United States military service ==
In 1943, at the age of 22, Bob Vickman joined the United States Army Air Forces and served on a photography unit in the Asian-Pacific front, where he undertook about two hundred hours of combat flying.

== Volunteer pilot in Israeli Air Force ==
After the war, Vickman went back to school. Before he was able to complete the requirements for graduation, he volunteered to serve in the "Mahal" as a pilot in the air force of the newly reborn Jewish state, the fledgling Israeli Air Force.

In the 1948 Arab-Israeli War, on July 9, 1948, Vickman flew a mission over the Israeli Negev Desert in an Avia S-199. He never returned from the mission, and his body was never recovered.

Vickman was the co-creator of the symbol of the famous 101 Squadron, Israel's first fighter squadron, which flew its first mission on May 29, 1948. Its symbol was the Angel of Death, derived from the Biblical account of the ten plagues wherein the Angel of Death was the only plague that was able to completely defeat the Egyptians.

An Egyptian account helps clear up Vickman's fate. As Vickman egressed from an attack on a ship in Cairo harbour thought to be unloading troops and supplies, he spotted an REAF Lysander. Vickman couldn't have known that the Deputy Director General of the REAF, Air Commodore Abd al Moneim Mikaati, was flying that Lysander from Cairo to Al Arish. Mikaati recalled:

...My gunner - I don't remember his name - was a keen-sighted man and he spotted an Israeli Messerschmitt as it maneuvered into a position to attack. Of course, my Lysander was a very old kind of airplane but I'd flown these for a long time. Still, we were at a big disadvantage and you'd expect that such a contest could only end one way. The pilot of the Israeli aircraft came up behind us. I told my gunner to fire just before the Messerschmitt came into range and I went down to about 100 feet. Then the gunner fired and I throttled right back. You know the Lysander can drop like a stone to land in a field - like they did when the RAF took spies in and out of France. The Israeli must have been concentrating on keeping me in his sights because he dropped his nose to follow. He overshot and went right in, almost level with me. I honestly felt sick in my stomach and - I don't know why - I saluted him.

Mikaati does not say his gunner hit the plane.

== Film: Above and Beyond ==
The Machal pilots, including Bob Vickman, are the subject of the film Above and Beyond - The Untold True Story.

== See also ==
- 101 Squadron (Israel)
- Modi Alon
