= Yosef Alon =

Israeli Air Force officer (1929–1973)

- יוסף אלון
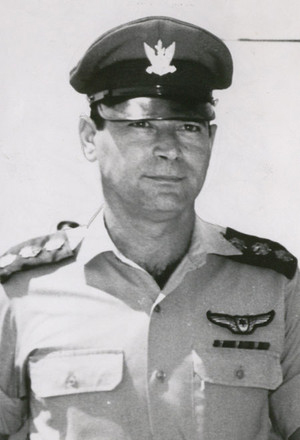
- Born: July 25, 1929; Ein Harod, Mandatory Palestine
- Died: July 1, 1973 (aged 43); Chevy Chase, Maryland, U.S.
- Military career
- Allegiance: Israel
- Branch: Israeli Air Force
- Service years: 1949–1973
- Rank: Colonel
- Commands: 101 Squadron; Hatzerim Airbase
- Other work: Assistant Air and Naval Attaché to U.S

Yosef (Joe) Alon (Hebrew: יוסף (ג'ו) אלון), born Josef Plaček (July 25, 1929 – July 1, 1973), was an Israeli Air Force officer and military attaché to the U.S. who was shot and killed in the driveway of his home in Chevy Chase, Maryland. The killer was never identified and Alon's murder remains unsolved.

== Early life ==
Alon was born Josef Plaček on kibbutz Ein Harod to Jewish immigrants from Czechoslovakia, Siegfried 'Friedl' and Thekla Plaček. When he was two, his family returned to Czechoslovakia, where they settled in Teplice, in the Sudetenland. Following the 1938 Munich Agreement, which resulted in the annexation of Sudetenland to Nazi Germany, Alon and his family moved to Prague.

On the eve of World War II, Alon's father sent 10-year-old Josef and his elder brother David to the United Kingdom as part of the Kindertransport program. He was then adopted by George and Jenny Davidson, a childless Christian couple.

Most of his family was wiped out during the Holocaust, with his parents being murdered at Auschwitz. Following the war, he returned to Czechoslovakia and attempted to start a career as a jeweler. He then graduated from a vocational school, and then enlisted in the Czechoslovak Air Force, where he successfully completed a pilot course.

== Family ==
Alon married Dvora Alon (née Kirat), a Jewish immigrant from Yemen, in January 1954. They had three daughters; Dalia (born 1954), Yael (born 1959), and Rachel (born 1968).

== IAF career ==
In 1947, he volunteered for the first pilots' course in the Sherut Avir, the Haganah's nascent air corps. Soon afterward, he moved back to Mandate Palestine, changed his name to Yosef Alon, and upon Israeli independence in 1948, was among the founding members of the Israeli Air Force (IAF).

Alon fought in the 1948 Arab–Israeli War as a fighter pilot and early member of the nascent IAF, and would go on to complete 75 missions. In 1953, he became one of Israel's first jet pilots. From 1953 to 1956, he flew Gloster Meteor and Dassault Ouragan aircraft in the IAF.

From August 1960 to August 1961 Alon served as a Mystère IV pilot and as Commander of the 101 Squadron, which was equipped with Mystère IV aircraft. In November 1961, he returned to command 101 Squadron as the IAF's first Mirage III squadron. In 1965, after attending a command and training course in England, Alon went on to head the Air Force safety industry. The highlights of his career in the IAF was the establishment of the Flying Safety branch and the Hatzerim Airbase, which he commanded from 1966 to 1970.

In 1970, then a colonel, Alon was chosen to be the assistant air and naval attaché at Israel's Embassy in Washington, DC. Installed in what should have been a three-year assignment, Alon advocated strongly on Israeli arms procurement, especially regarding the F-4 Phantom. He also established close relationship with the American Jewish community, assisted with the activities of the United Jewish Appeal, and gave lectures to students on Israel's cause.

== Assassination ==
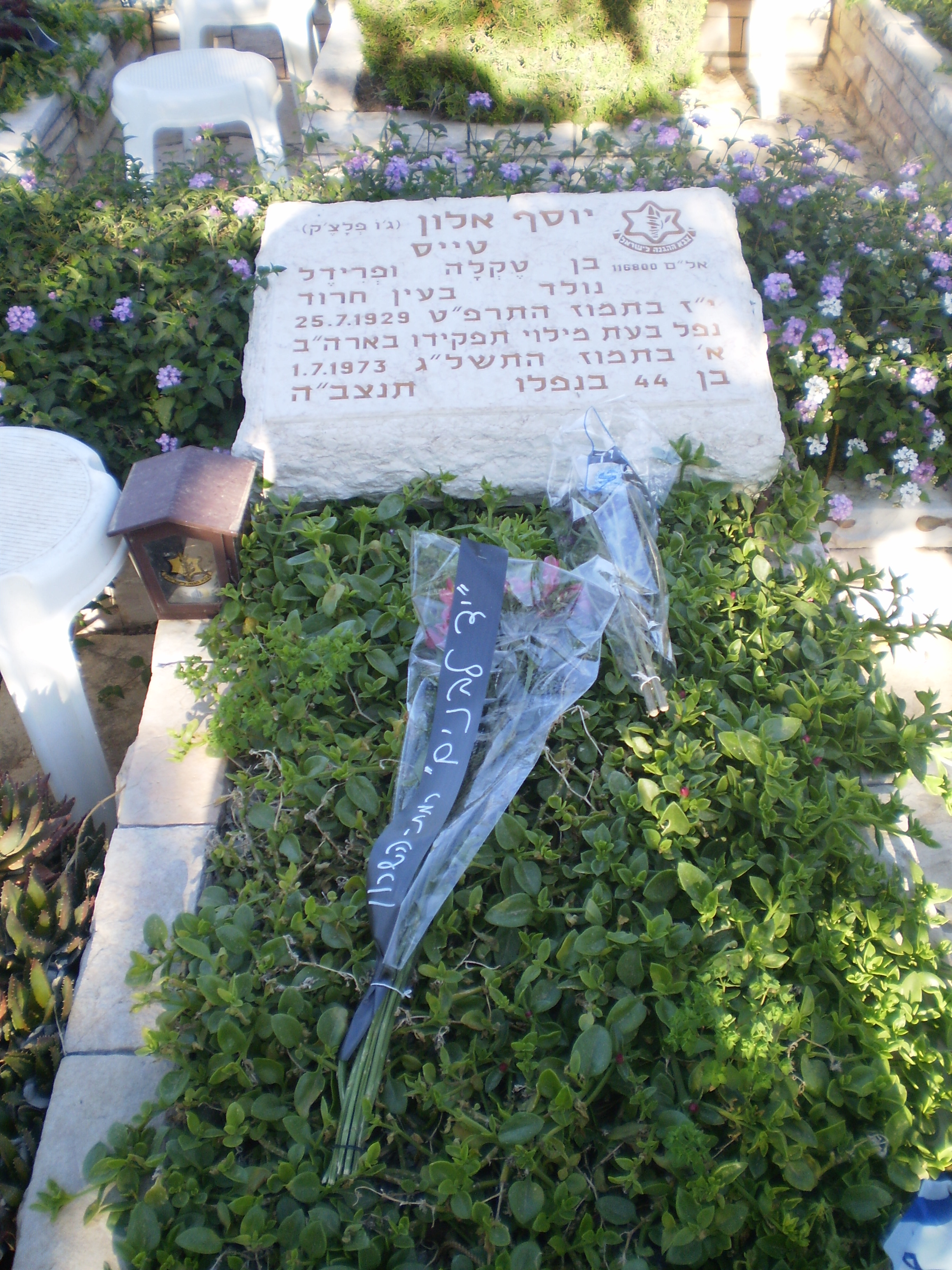
Alon's grave in Kiryat Shaul Military Cemetery

On the night of June 30, 1973, 44-year-old Yosef Alon and his wife Dvora went to a dinner party for a departing Israeli embassy staffer. At roughly 12:30 am on July 1, the couple entered their Ford Galaxie and drove home to Chevy Chase, Maryland, arriving about a half-hour later. Dvora exited the vehicle and walked 20–30 feet to their porch, while Alon gathered up his sports jacket on the back seat.

At this moment Alon was shot in his chest five times with copper-jacketed military bullets by a foreign-made .38 caliber revolver, either an F.I.E. Titan Tiger or a German Arminius. One shot that pierced his heart would soon prove to be fatal, while the other shots caused only minor wounds. Dvora rushed inside and called the police, seeing only a light-colored car drive away, and then returned to the front yard. She attempted with her 18-year-old daughter Dahlia to stem his bleeding with towels. Alon was taken to a hospital, where he died at 1:27 am.

== Aftermath ==
Alon's family accepted President Richard Nixon’s offer to repatriate Alon's body to Israel onboard an USAF C-137 Stratoliner. The aircraft left the US from Andrews Air Force Base in Maryland, arriving at Lod Airport in Tel Aviv, with his family onboard.

Alon is buried with full military honours at Kiryat Shaul Military Cemetery.

=== Palestinian claim ===
Later on July 1 the Cairo-based Voice of Palestine broadcast that "After the assassination of martyr Mohammed Boudia at the hands of the Zionist intelligence elements in Paris, Colonel Yosef Alon... was executed... His is the first execution operation carried out against a Zionist official in the U.S."

=== US investigation ===
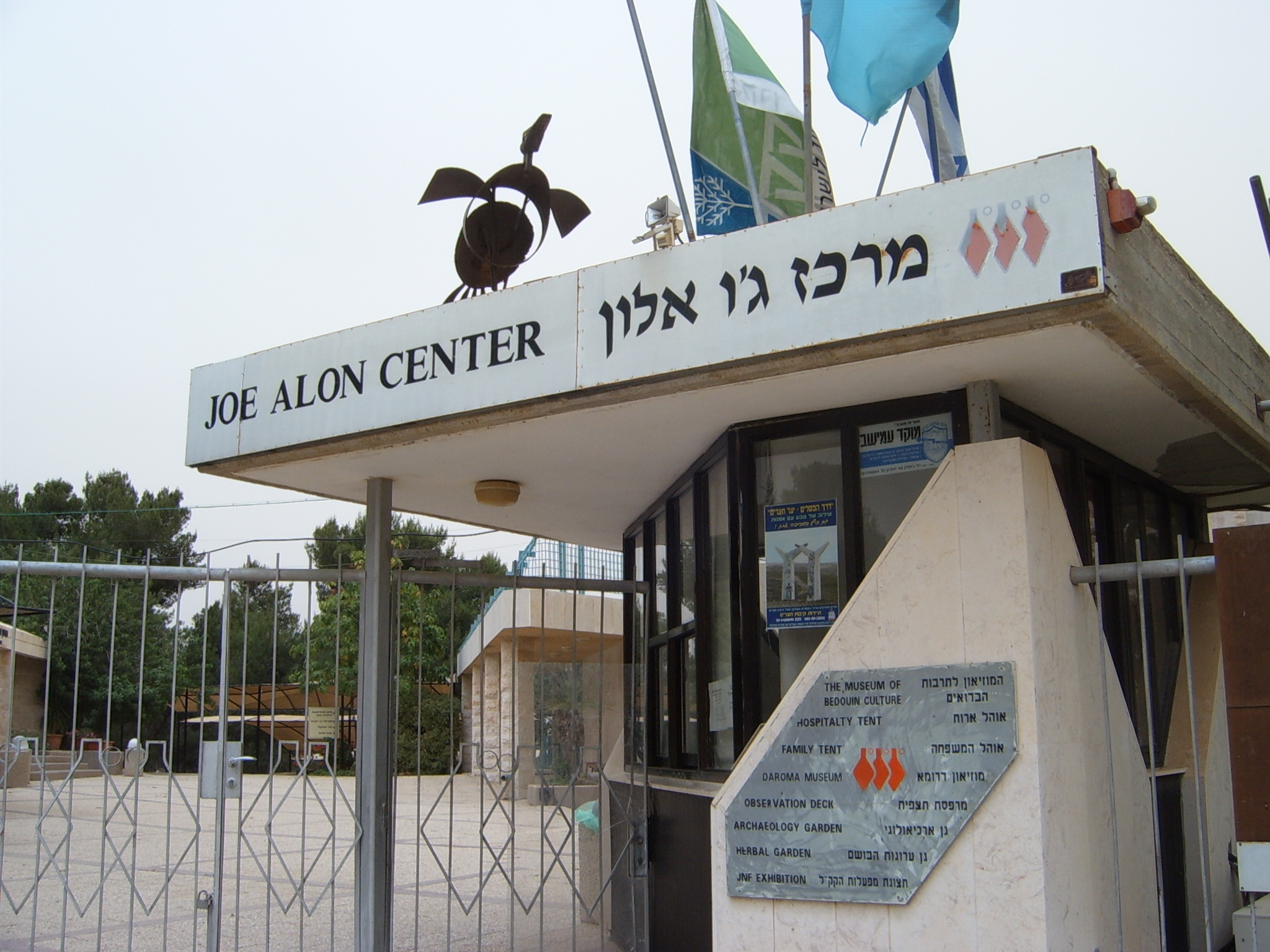
The Joe Alon Center, a regional studies institute in the Negev opened in his honor

The FBI investigation, "Murder of Assistant Air Attaché Col. Joseph Alon" (MURDA), quickly focused on a possible link with Arab terrorism, including following leads given by the Shin Bet, but was ultimately closed in March 1976 without discovering the perpetrators, according to the Associated Press. Sometime later, the CIA was reported to have been told by a "Fedayeen senior official" that on the orders of Black September, two students, using Lebanese or Cypriot passports, had passed across the Canada–US border and come to Washington, where, with the help of a local professor, they had rented a car and got the weapons for the assassination. Afterwards, the students were reported to have abandoned the rental for another, which they used to get to Dulles International Airport; from there they flew on to the West Coast of the United States, East Asia, and finally the Middle East. This information was passed to the FBI in February 1977, but they could make no new progress, and the investigation was closed. The following year, the collected evidence for the case was destroyed by the Baltimore office of the FBI.

Dvora Alon died in 1995 without knowing the identity of her husband's killer.

=== Theories ===
==== Black September ====
In his book Chasing Shadows (Palgrave Macmillan), Fred Burton, former deputy chief of the counterterrorism division of the U.S. State Department's Diplomatic Security Service and vice-president of the private intelligence and consulting firm Stratfor, concluded after a lengthy investigation that Alon's killer was an agent from Black September named Hassan Ali who was killed by Mossad in 2011.

==== Israeli agents ====
The documentary film Who Shot My Father? The Story of Joe Alon by Liora Amir Barmatz aired on the First Channel in Israel in April 2011. The historian Uri Milstein and Colonel Yakov Agassi presented a theory which said that Alon had been assassinated because he unwillingly learned about the conspiracy theory (the Kissinger plan) for the Yom Kippur War, which involved collusion between the US, Israel, and Egypt and was designed to allow entry for the US into the region as a "savior" (and future power broker) for both Israel and Egypt by stopping the fighting after previously agreed-upon objectives had been achieved. Ezer Weizman claimed that "Jo was killed because he knew something he should not know about." The film also claimed that general Shmuel Gonen had said to journalist Adam Baruch, who wrote in his book that he was killed "by one of our own" because he knew something he should not know about. Professor Uri Bar-Joseph has rejected the theory and the findings.

=== Renewed investigation ===
Due to a lead developed years earlier by journalist Adam Goldman, the FBI reopened the case in January 2017. The new investigation involves information recently given to an agent by Venezuelan terrorist Carlos the Jackal, that sometime after 1970 three American veterans sympathetic to the Palestinian cause, one of them a "prominent former Black Panther," approached Mahmoud Ould Saleh, a Mauritania-born manager of the Arabic Bookshop on the Rue Saint Victor in the Latin Quarter of Paris and member of the extremist Palestinian "rejection front" (killed in 1977.) Saleh put them in touch with suspected Black September militant Kamal Kheir Beik (later killed), known to have managed terror attacks including the 1975 OPEC siege. Every sale of the gun identified as the murder weapon, a .38-caliber revolver, that was sold east of the Mississippi, has previously been identified by the FBI, which was tracing the purchasers of those guns.

== See also ==
- List of unsolved murders (1900–1979)
- List of incidents of political violence in Washington, D.C.
- List of attacks against Israeli embassies and diplomats
