= Gordon Levett =

British Royal Air Force pilot

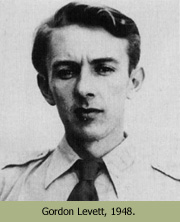
Lt. Col. Gordon Levett, Israeli Air Force, 1948

Gordon Levett (21 March 1921–2000) was a former Royal Air Force pilot in World War II who volunteered for a covert mission to fly supplies including dismantled fighter planes into the fledgling state of Israel in its 1948 Arab–Israeli War as part of Operation Balak. Later Levett joined the first squadron of the newly created Israeli Air Force, helping establish a permanent Israeli military and aiding in the founding of the state of Israel. Levett was the only English gentile pilot in the Israeli Air Force, where he rose to the rank of lieutenant colonel. He is the father of Blythe Masters.

== Biography ==
=== Background ===
Born into such poverty in London that his mother once placed him in an orphanage for eighteen months so he wouldn't starve, Levett joined the RAF in 1939 at age 17 when World War II broke out. Initially a groundcrewman, Levett applied for a pilot slot and in November 1940 was sent to flight school. He spent the rest of the war training other pilots and flying transport planes, becoming a squadron leader. But he was subsequently court-martialled and dismissed from the RAF after taking unauthorized leave from his remote Burma base, and so after the war was unable to find work as an aviator.

Levett went to work in a Jewish-owned diaper laundry in London, where he learned about developments in the Middle East. When he read of attempts to found an Israeli state, he volunteered to join the Israeli Mahal unit, a group of 5,000-odd overseas volunteers in early 1948. The Mahal were established to assist what had been a largely underground Zionist force. After two meetings with Jewish agents in London, Levett was supplied with a ticket for Paris. From there he was sent to Czechoslovakia.

=== With the Israeli Air Force ===
The Mahal pilots, mostly English Jews, began ferrying dismantled Avia S-199s (a modified Messerschmitt-109G with a bomber engine and gunpods) fighter aircraft from their base in Žatec, Czechoslovakia, where a group of mostly American Jewish volunteers had assembled a fleet of transport aircraft acquired in the United States, to Ekron airbase in an operation codenamed Operation Balak. Levett's job was shuttling the Avias and an enormous cache of arms bought from the Czechs, with Soviet approval, to Israel. The cargo included the disassembled fighter planes, bombs, firearms and even first aid equipment.

Located on an out-of-the-way road in a rural area some 20 miles from the East German border, the Czech base was a primitive facility with a small control tower, a few huts and a single concrete runway used by the Luftwaffe during World War II. The scene at the tiny facility startled Levett and other volunteers: they were greeted by a jarring jumble of American transport aircraft and several Messerschmitt 109 fighters, six or seven Curtiss Commando C-46s, a Douglas Skymaster DC-4 and several smaller aircraft. "Even more astonishing, the ground staff wore baseball caps and were speaking with American accents."

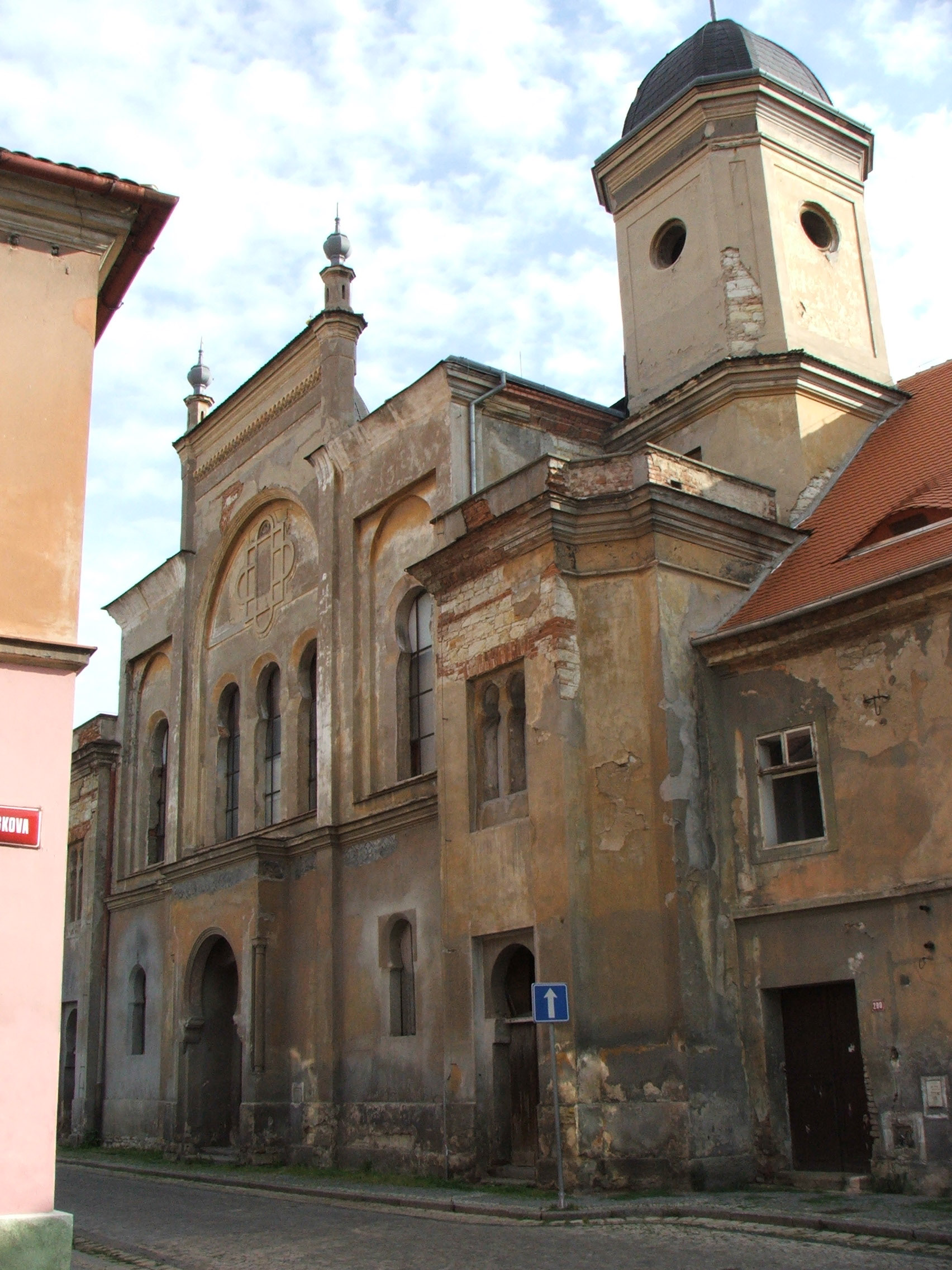
Bombed-out synagogue in Žatec, Czechoslovakia, site of Operation Balak

The Balak airlift, operating under Israel's Air Transport Command, lasted three months. Operating under cover of darkness, Levett transported tons of arms, ammunition and personnel, as well as the disassembled Avias. The airlift was instrumental in Israel's success in the war. The hazardous trips, recounted by Levett in his memoir Flying Under Two Flags: An RAF Pilot in Israel's War of Independence, skirted enemy groundfire and hostile fighter planes in making their deliveries.

Some 5,000 foreigners from Mahal volunteered to help Israel in the fight for independence. Levett was one of the few non-Jews, and his role as the primary pilot in the Balak airlift proved pivotal. The Avia fighters, dismantled and flown in pieces from the Czech base, were reassembled and painted in new colors when they arrived in Israel. The fighters Levett transported became the backbone of the new Jewish state's first air force.

Following the airlift, Levett joined Squadron 101 in November 1948. The squadron, which included Ezer Weizman (later commander of the Israeli Air Force, Minister of Defense and President of Israel), was instrumental in the war. During its first eight months, the fighter squadron shot down 20 Arab aircraft, including a few former RAF fighter planes piloted by the enemy during a January 1949 engagement. In that unlikely dogfight, Israeli pilots flying Nazi-designed Avias downed several English-made Spitfires flown by the Egyptians.

Being a non-Jew wasn't the only thing that made Levett unusual. Some of the fledgling nation's new pilots were strictly mercenaries, paid far more than volunteers like Levett. Levett was scornful of the motives of the mercenaries. "One American fighter pilot," he wrote, "was getting 2,000 dollars-a-month and a 500-dollar bonus for every enemy aircraft he shot down," Levett recalled in his memoir. "They did their job well, but I did not care for them. At the toss of a shekel they would have been on the other side."

Before he began flying the hazardous sorties for 101 Squadron, Levett had kept secret from his Israeli handlers the fact that he had never flown a single RAF combat mission in a fighter, although he had trained in them. His only operational experience was flying lumbering cargo planes.

His early attempts at flying the nimble British-made Spitfires and American-made Mustangs didn't always go smoothly. The Spitfires weighed less than four tons; the C-46 cargo planes Levett flew weighed more than 25 tons. Eventually Levett grew accustomed to the smaller aircraft, but it was a steep learning curve. The morning of Levett's first combat sortie on 28 December 1948, for instance, found Levett and pilot Syd Cohen dining on boiled eggs and black coffee in the predawn hours; both pilots were nervous. They were dressed casually, without badges of rank. They listened to the sound of their Spitfire Merlins being readied for flight on the tarmac. Levett had such jitters that he filled an ashtray sitting at the table.

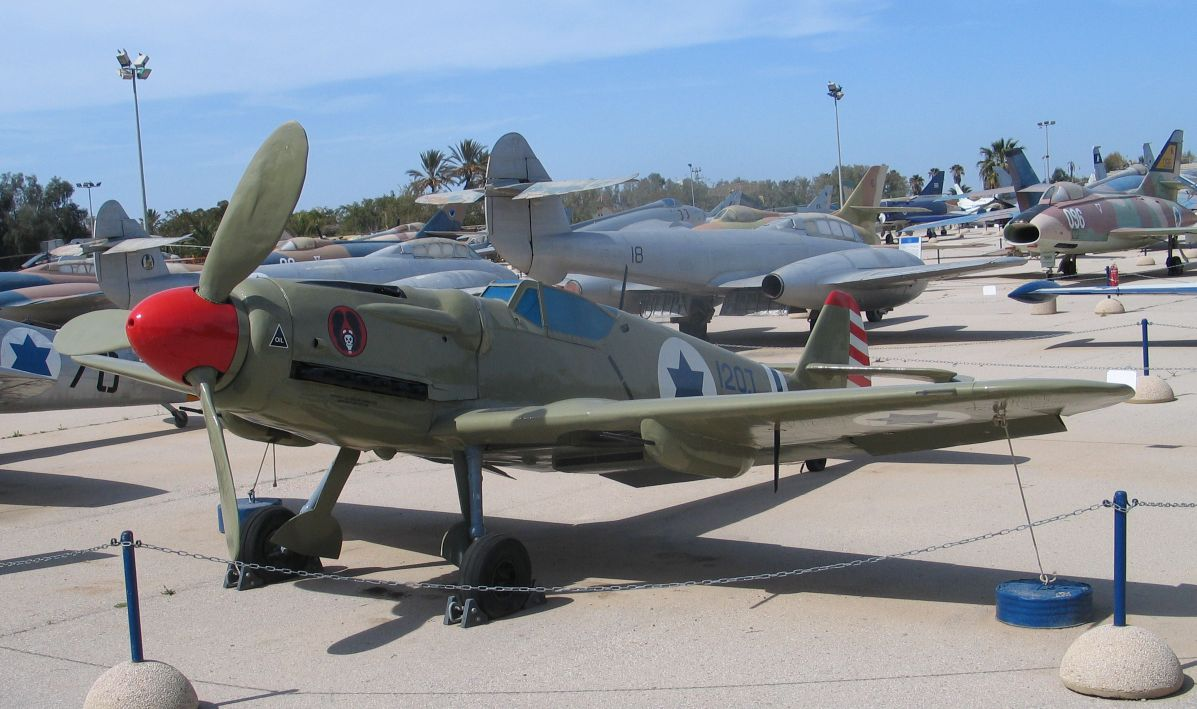
Avia 199 fighter planes flown by Squadron 101, Israeli Air Force

Nor was Levett's inexperience his only obstacle. When he joined the Israeli forces, the Israeli agents believed that the English gentile and former RAF pilot was likely a British spy. Levett's English passport made him especially suspect: most Israelis saw the English as opponents of the Zionist cause.

"Not only was he not a Jew," said The New York Times, "but Mr. Levett was particularly notable because he was British. To most Israelis at that time, the recently lapsed British mandate in Palestine had been decidedly pro-Arab, and British Government policy was seen as anti-Zionist. Recruited in March 1948 by emissaries in Europe of the Haganah, the Jewish fighting force in Palestine, Mr. Levett was viewed with a healthy dose of suspicion."

"'In my last interview," Levett told The New York Times, 'I was told, 'We're quite convinced that you are a British spy, but we're going to take you to see what you're up to.'"

Levett turned out to be no spy. Decades later, in May 1998, he and several hundred Mahal volunteers were invited by Israel to be honored for their service at celebrations of the country's 50th anniversary. "Their expertise was critical," noted the Times, "in helping what was previously an underground Zionist force win the war against the Arab armies."

The operation in which Levett had taken part succeeded in supplying arms to the Israelis, but it was controversial and hazardous: The airlift violated a United Nations embargo on arms shipments to the Middle Eastern combatants.

Some flights by the neophyte fighter pilot Levett involved actual bombing raids using transport planes jury rigged into bombers. The modified transports made bombing runs from the Sinai Peninsula to Damascus, Syria. The modified bombers had no bomb racks. Instead, the few bombs they carried were pushed out the aircraft's belly by a human 'bomb-chucker' who was tied to the aircraft's frame with rope.

Levett survived the nerve-jangling raids. In his memoir decades later, Levett recalled his enthusiasm for the Israeli cause and his frustration with the British Government's position. England's refusal to cooperate with a 1947 plan to partition Palestine into Arab and Jewish states, and the British threat to remove its stabilizing forces from the region, compelled Levett to volunteer for the Israeli forces. Soon he felt comfortable in their ranks. He felt more at home walking down Ben-Gurion Street in Tel Aviv, Levett said later, than he did strolling in Piccadilly.

Some jarring contrasts from the conflict stayed with him. At the Žatec base, for instance, the Israeli-bound, German-designed Avias were festooned with the Star of David instead of swastikas. Later, Levett heard a rumor that former Luftwaffe pilots had been recruited as mercenaries by the Arab forces, and he wondered if he would have to face an old foe. He also wrestled with the prospect that someday he might face an RAF fighter in combat over Palestine. (A possibility which, fortunately, never presented itself.) "I remembered E. M. Forster's apophthegm that if he ever had to choose between cause and country," wrote Levett, "he hoped he would have the guts to choose the cause."

"Looking back, I have neither failed nor succeeded, the fate of most of us," Levett wrote in his memoir, "but I shall leave the world a better place than when I entered it because I helped found the State of Israel."

Following the war, Levett left Squadron 101, where he had flown over 20 combat missions and downed two Egyptian fighters, and instead took command of Squadron 106 of the Israeli Air Force, formerly a ragtag transport unit staffed by American volunteers. Levett transformed the squadron into a full-fledged Israeli Air Force unit. At his new post, Levett trained new native transport pilots. For his accomplishments, he was promoted to the rank of Sgan Aluf (lieutenant colonel) in the Israeli Air Force.

=== Later life ===
Eventually, Levett retired from the Israeli Air Force. He gave some thought to remaining in Israel, but decided instead to return to England. On his return home, the former orphan and diaper laundry worker found work again as a pilot. He began ferrying planes for aircraft companies, often flying back to Israel for El Al Airline.

Gordon Levett died in England in 2000 at age 79. Israeli and Jewish organizations worldwide mourned his death.

== See also ==
- Mahal (Israel)
- George Beurling
