= Avraham Lanir =

Israeli Air Force officer

Avi Lanir
- אבי לניר
- Born: January 25, 1940; Herzliya, Mandatory Palestine
- Died: 16 October 1973; Aleppo, Syria
- Burial place: Mount Herzl, Jerusalem
- Military career
- Allegiance: Israel
- Branch: Israeli Air Force
- Service years: 1959–1973
- Rank: Lieutenant Colonel
- Commands: 101 Squadron (Israel)
- Awards: Medal of Courage

Avraham "Avi" Lanir (Hebrew: אברהם "אבי" לניר; January 25, 1940 – ~ 1973) was a lieutenant colonel in the Israel Air Force. He was the highest-ranking Israeli fighter pilot to fall into enemy hands.

His image was engraved in the Israeli consciousness as a heroic figure, as a man who gave his life under severe torture in captivity in Syria and did not divulge the secrets of the state in which he was trusted - secrets that probably touched on the subject of "the weapon that Israel never admitted to exist". For this act he was given the medal of courage.

== Biography ==
Avraham Lankin (later Lanir) was born in 1940 in Herzliya. His parents Yaacov and Malka were active members in the British Mandate era militant group Irgun. His father went on to become a senior member of the Shin Bet. His uncle, Eliyahu Lankin, was the commander of the weapons ship Altelena. When he was about ten months old, his father enlisted in the British Army to participate in the fight against the Nazis in World War II.

In his childhood, Lanir studied at various schools in Tel Aviv, Jerusalem, and Netanya, with the family following his father's employment relocations throughout Israel. In 1954, the family moved to Washington, D.C. in the framework of Lanir’s father’s work in the service of the state of Israel. Lanir attended high school in Washington, D.C. and graduated with honors. He returned to Israel with his family at age 17 and for the year which remained before his enlistment he studied electronics at the Israeli Air Force’s technical academy.

In August 1962, Lanir married Michal Barzilai. Barzilai's family was close to Mapai and had ideologies opposite to that of Avi's family. Michal's uncle, Aryeh Polonsky, was a member of the Haganah organization and was murdered by assassins from the Irgun in 1939. The couple had two children, Noam (who became a successful businessman) and Nurit.

== Air Force Career ==
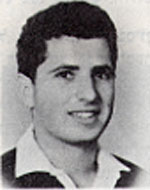
Avraham Lanir

Lanir enlisted in the Israel Defense Forces in 1959, training to become a fighter pilot. As a cadet in a pilot course he excelled throughout the course and later became known for his coolness and perfect performance during an exercise that simulates falling into captivity.

In 1963, when he was serving as an instructor at a flight school, his plane, a Fuoga Magister type, collided with a Sud Aviation Vautour plane during a night flight over the area of the meteorological station in Beit Dagan. Lanir managed to abandon the plane, which was not equipped with an ejection seat, but the trainee sitting in the front seat was killed when the plane crashed near Kibbutz Givat Brenner. This was the first aerial abandonment of this model in the service of the Israeli Air Force since the aircraft entered service in 1956, after several successful abandonments in other air forces.

In 1965 Lanir was sent to study electrical engineering at the Technion – Israel Institute of Technology, from which he graduated in 1969. He was thereafter appointed to test pilot the "Technolog," the prototype that preceded the IAI Kfir.

He flew the Dassault Mirage III with 117 Squadron and on April 6, 1967, scored his first aerial kill in a major skirmish along the Syrian border which ended with the downing of six Syrian jets. Lanir, flying Mirage 60, downed a SAF MiG-21 with cannon fire after closing in to a distance of 200 meters. The MiG exploded and Lanir flew right through the fireball, covering his aircraft with soot. Initially blinded, enough soot was eventually blown off his canopy to afford Lanir a safe landing at Ramat David. The scorched aircraft earned the nickname "Black Mirage", and Lanir flew it once again during Operation Focus on June 5, 1967, when he participated in a strike against the Egyptian air base at Fayid. The aircraft was lost 2 days later over Iraq.

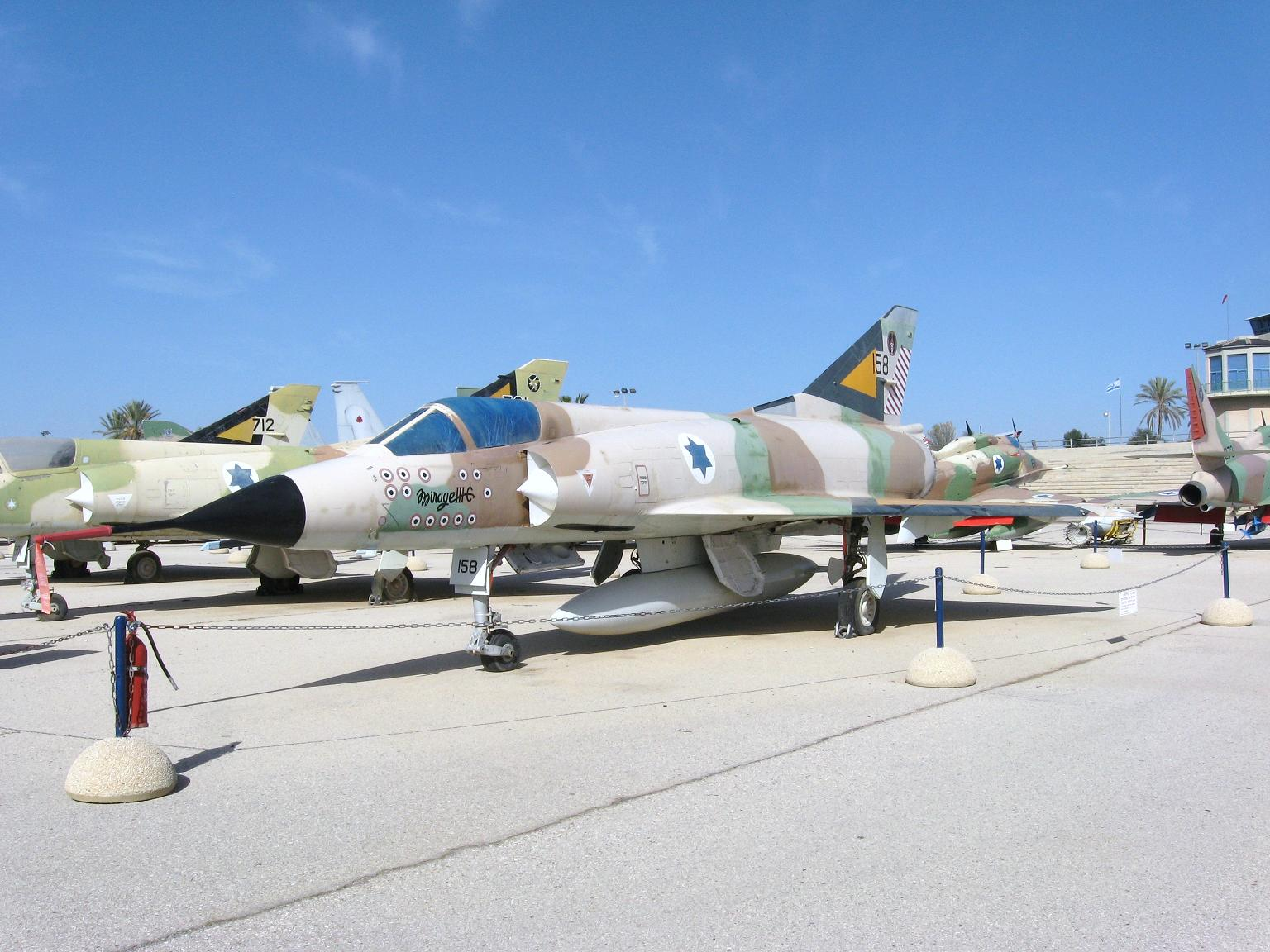
Mirage (1)58, bearing 13 kill markings, at the Israeli Air Force Museum in Hatzerim. Lanir was flying this aircraft when he scored his third, and the aircraft's tenth, kill on October 12, 1973

After the Six-Day War Lanir converted to the Dassault Super Mystere which he flew as the senior deputy commander of 105 Squadron during the War of Attrition.

In 1971, Lanir was assigned command of 101 Squadron, operating the Dassault Mirage out of Hazor. He scored his second aerial kill on November 9, 1972, downing a Syrian MiG-21 while flying Mirage 72. On October 12, 1973, a week after the Yom Kippur War began, Lanir scored his third and last aerial kill, downing a Syrian MiG-17 in the vicinity of Kuneitra while flying Mirage 58.

== Capture and death ==
During the Yom Kippur War, on October 13, 1973, around 11 A.M., Lanir took off for an interception mission deep in Syrian territory. He was most probably not present at the squadron's morning briefing, and was not aware of the location of the mobile missile batteries that the Syrians placed during the night.

On his way back to Israel, Lanir and his deputy were caught in a missile ambush. Lanir's Mirage was hit in the rear by an SA-3 surface-to-air missile and began to burn. Lanir managed to steer his damaged plane westward until he had to abandon it over Israeli territory. Unfortunately, a strong westerly wind swept the parachute towards the Syrian forces.

Lanir arrived safely on the ground in the area of Mazraat Beit Jinn. Israeli armored soldiers from the 188th Armored Brigade saw him parachute but mistakenly thought he was a MiG pilot. Several minutes later, the commander of the rescue unit, Eliezer Cohen, contacted the armor brigade in the sector, who quickly sent several tanks to rescue Lanir.

Lanir detached himself from the parachute and started running towards the Israeli armor. The Syrians, who wanted to stop Lanir's run, fired several artillery shells at him. As the minutes passed, Syrian commandos managed to surround Lanir. Lanir was seen being lifted off the ground and put into a Syrian Armoured Personnel Carrier, which sped away to the east.

When news of Lanir's capture became known, great concern was expressed in the IDF and Israel's political leadership. Their fear grew because, contrary to the Syrian custom of showing captured Israeli pilots on television, Lanir was not seen in public. According to the testimony of Prof. Yuval Ne'eman, Prime Minister Golda Meir told Henry Kissinger that the Israeli government was willing to give up the Hermon peak in exchange for 28 Israeli pilots (and Lanir among them) who were captured by Syria. The need to rescue Lanir from his captors was critical.

Lanir's body was returned to Israel in 1974, with signs of torture. As he had been spotted walking when captured by the Syrians and Israeli POWs who had previously returned from Syria reported that he had been alive for at least a month after his capture, it was assumed that he had died as a result of torture.

Based on the testimony of Capt. Amichai Rokah, an Air Force crew member who was captured the day before Lanir's capture, it became clear that the two talked to each other in a Syrian hospital while lying on either side of a divider. To Rokah's question, Lanir replied "my situation is very severe, I have fractures in my arms and legs, they broke my bones".

After an examination of the body at the Institute of Forensic Medicine, and after a comprehensive investigation by the Information Security Branch of the Field Security Department of the Intelligence Division, which asked to know whether the secrets had been leaked to the Syrians, it was determined in a detailed report that the answer is an unequivocal no.

In a letter published for the first time in 2023, written by the commander of the Air Force in the Yom Kippur War, Benny Peled, which was addressed to the Chief of Staff Mota Gur, and the title of which is "The issue: medal awarding to the lieutenant colonel Avi Lanir". It says: "After a long examination and encompassing about the circumstances of Avi's death in captivity in Syria, I got to the conclusion that I should recommend awarding the medal of courage to the commander of the 101 squadron. In his position as commander of 101, lieutenant colonel Avi Lanir was a complete secret partner (in the project), and was the only one among all the prisoners from the Yom Kippur War who had such information". Peled comes to the conclusion that the system's secrets were carefully guarded, even though Lanir was "harshly tortured and interrogated", and recommends that Michal, his widow, would receive the decoration on his behalf. Lanir was buried in the military cemetery on Mount Herzl.

In April 1976, Lanir was awarded the medal of courage. In the description of the reasons for the decoration it was stated:

On the 17th of Tishrei 1973 (October 13, 1973), during a combat flight in the Golan Heights, the plane of the late Lt. Col. Avraham Lanir was damaged, and he was forced to abandon it in enemy territory. Lt. Col. Avraham Lanir parachuted and landed alive. He was captured and taken hostage. The Lt. Col. Avraham Lanir was tortured to death by his interrogators and did not reveal any information. In these actions, the Lt. Col. Avraham Lanir showed courage, loyalty and supreme sacrifice. For this act he was awarded the decoration of courage.

Chief of Staff Mordechai Gur entrusted the decoration to Michal, Lanir's widow.

== Awards ==
- 1976: Medal of Courage (awarded posthumously)
