= Junkers Jumo 211 =

German inverted V-12 aircraft engine

Jumo 211
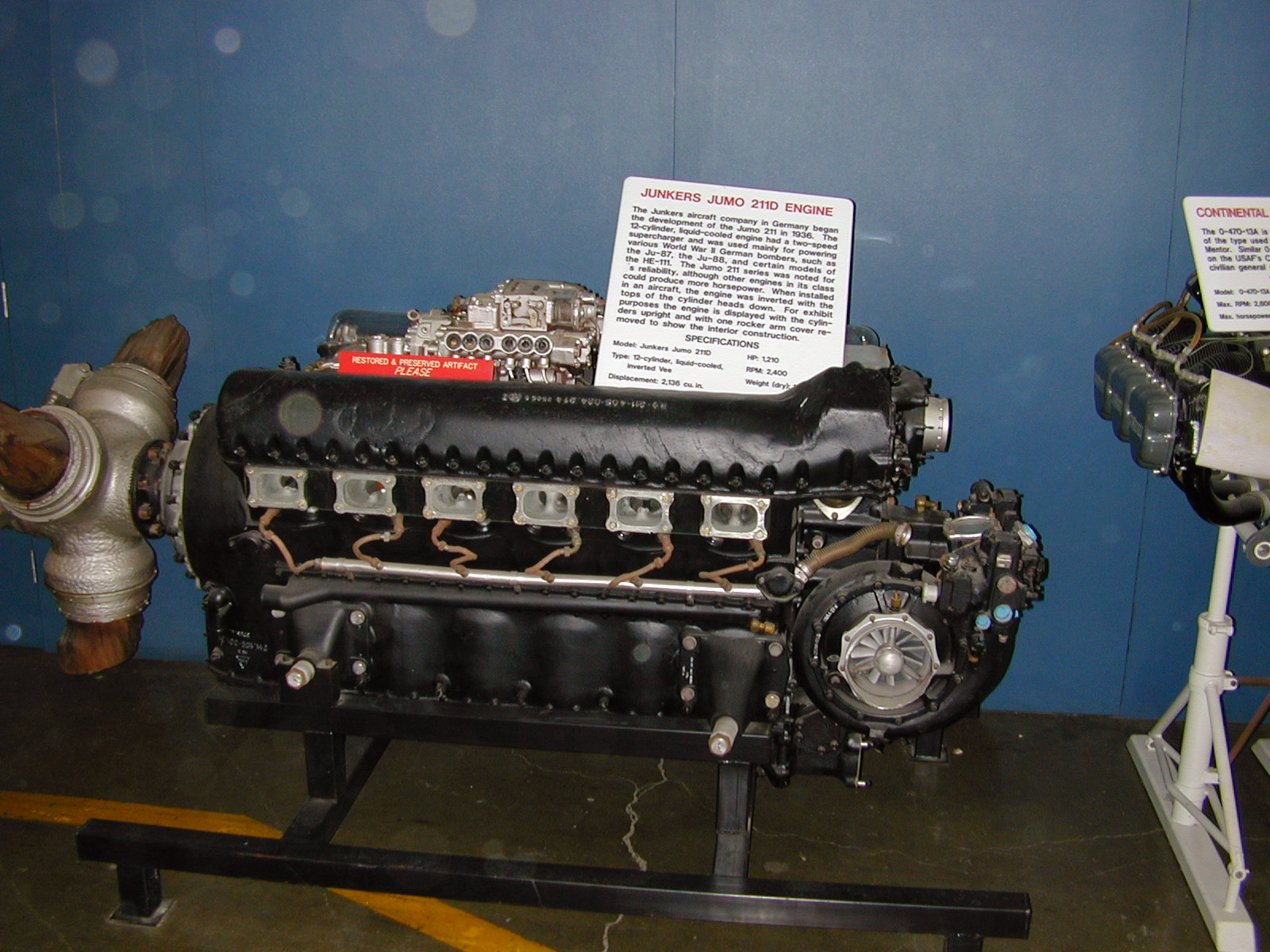
- Jumo 211D engine, mounted inverted in this photo
- Type: Piston V12 aero-engine
- Manufacturer: Junkers
- First run: 1936
- Major applications: Avia S-199; Heinkel He 111H; Junkers Ju 87B-G; Junkers Ju 88A/C
- Number built: 68,248
- Developed into: Jumo 213

The Jumo 211 was a German inverted V12 aircraft engine, Junkers Motoren's primary aircraft engine of World War II. It was the direct competitor to the Daimler-Benz DB 601 and closely paralleled its development. While the Daimler-Benz engine was mostly used in single-engined and twin-engined fighters, the Jumo engine was primarily used in bombers such as Junkers' own Ju 87 and Ju 88, and Heinkel's H-series examples of the Heinkel He 111 medium bomber. It was the most-produced German aero engine of the war, with almost 70,000 examples completed.

== Design and development ==
The Jumo 211 was developed by Dr. Franz Josef Neugebauer as scaled-up successor to the earlier Jumo 210. The 210 was Germany's first modern aviation engine, with three valves per cylinder, a cast crankcase, and supercharger as standard. When it was designed in the early 1930s, its 700 PS design power was a relatively common power rating and many pre-war German designs were based around it. As it was further developed, the 210G introduced a piston-driven direct fuel injection, allowing it to reach its full potential.

The 1930s saw rapid improvement in aircraft performance and great increases in size. In 1934, even before the new Jumo 210 had completed its acceptance tests, the RLM sent out a request for a new 1,000 PS (986 hp; 735 kW)-class engine of about 500 kg (1,100 lb) weight. Both Jumo and Daimler-Benz responded, and in order to reach service before the new Daimler-Benz DB 600, the Jumo team decided to make their new design as similar as possible to their 210H model, currently in testing.

The resulting Jumo 211 was first prototyped at Jumo's Dessau plant in 1935 and started testing in April 1936. Like the 210H, it featured a mechanical direct fuel injection system using small pistons driven off the crankshaft, three valves per cylinder, and an inverted V layout. It also had an open-cycle cooling system, working at atmospheric pressure. Limited production of the 1,000 PS Jumo 211A started in April 1937 at Dessau, with just over 1,000 completed before full production was started at Magdeburg in July.

Three models were provided with varied settings for its two-speed supercharger, tuned for different low- versus high-altitude performance. The first prototype aircraft powered by the 211A appeared in late 1937. Development of the 211 continued with the 211B being released in 1938, with a slightly increased maximum RPM of 2,400 which boosted power to 1200 PS (1184 HP). The later 211C and 211D differed primarily in the propeller gear ratios and other features.

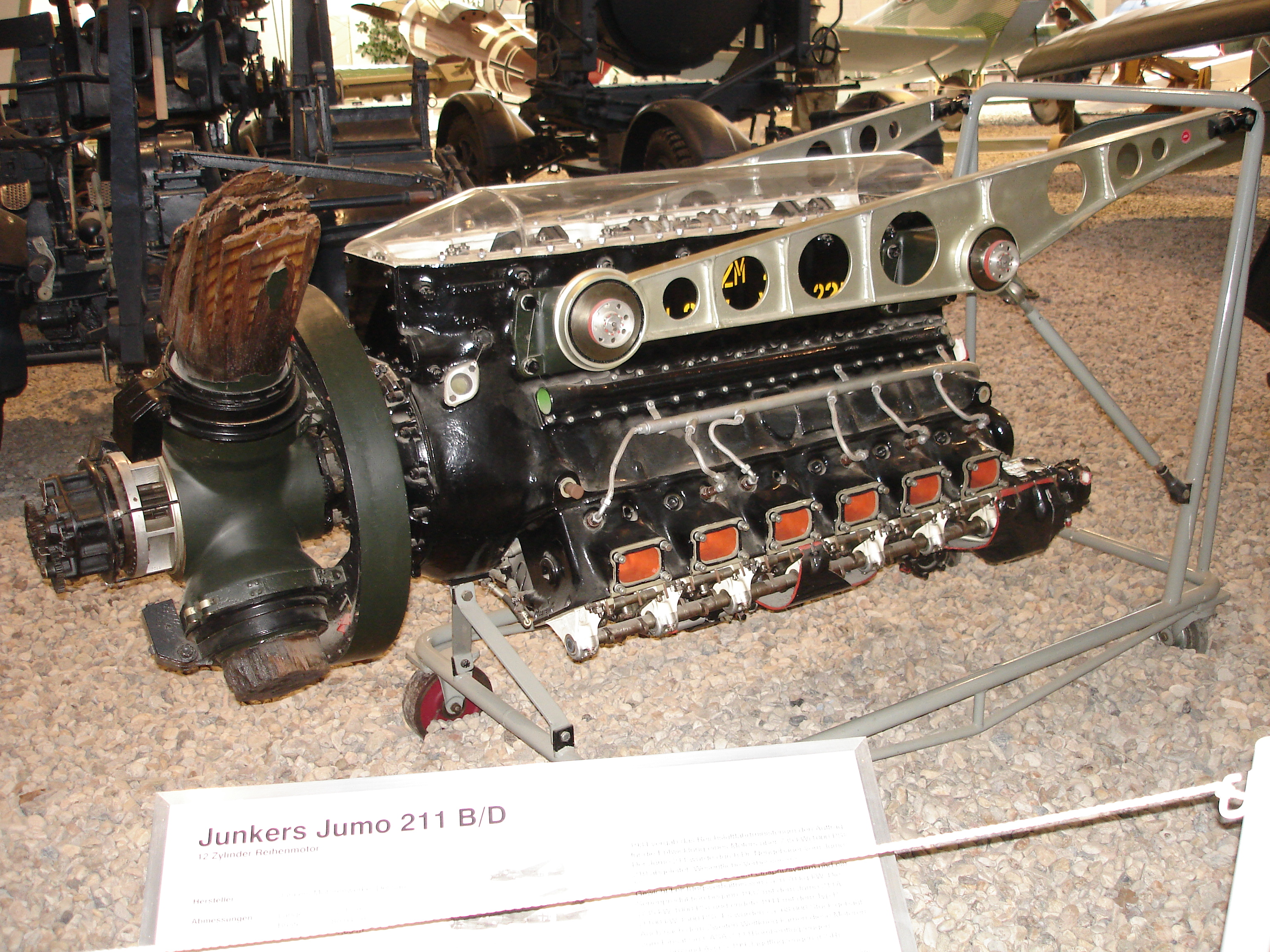
Junkers Jumo 211B/D engine at the Luftwaffenmuseum der Bundeswehr

The competing DB 600 design was generally similar but lacked the direct injection system. When the RLM expressed their opinion that all future engines include this feature, Daimler responded by introducing the DB 601 in late 1937.

A major upgrade was started by Junkers in 1940 adapting the Jumo 211 with a pressurized cooling system. Under pressure, the boiling point of water increases, allowing the engine to run hotter. This, in turn, allows a given amount of cooling fluid to carry away more energy. As a result, the engine could run at higher power settings with a smaller radiator system. The resulting 211E proved to be able to run at much higher power settings without overheating, so it was quickly followed by the 211F which included a strengthened crankshaft and a more efficient supercharger. Running at 2,600 RPM the 211F delivered 1,340 PS (1,320 hp; 990 kW) and the 211J (a 211F with intercooler) 1,420 PS (1,400 hp; 1,040 kW). Further improvements to this basic line led to the 1,450 PS (1,430 hp; 1,070 kW) 211N and 1,500 PS (1,500 hp; 1,100 kW) 211P in 1943, they were equivalent to the 211F/J but with slight boost increases and running at up to 2,700 rpm. Continued development of the 211 line evolved into the Jumo 213.

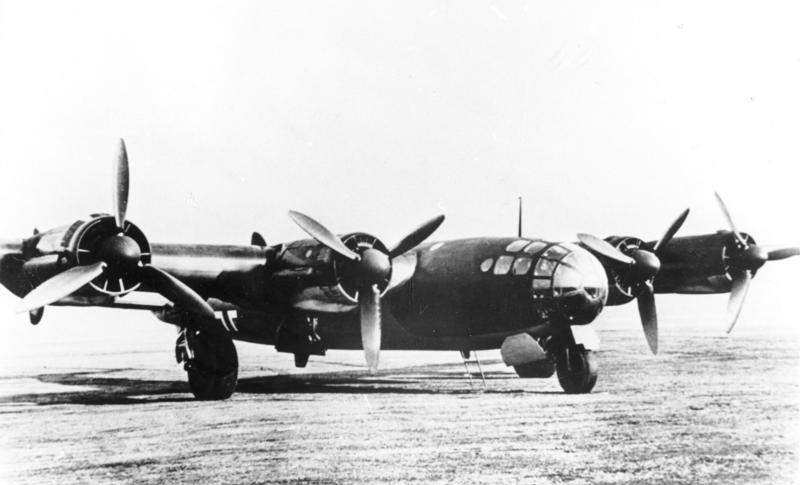
The Me 264 V1 Amerika Bomber contract competitor fitted with four unitized Jumo 211 engines, each one matching the type fitted to Ju 88As

The Jumo 211 became the major bomber engine of the war, in no small part due to Junkers also building a majority of the bombers then in use. Of course, since it was the Luftwaffe that selected the final engine to be used after competitive testing on prototypes (such as the Dornier Do 217), there is certainly more to it. Limited production capacity for each type, and the fact that the Jumo was perfectly capable (if not superior) in a bomber installation meant that it made sense to use both major types to the fullest; since the Daimler had a slight edge in a lightweight, single-engine application, that left the Jumo to fill in the remaining roles as a bomber engine. Even this wasn't enough in the end, and radial engines like the BMW 801 were increasingly put into service alongside the Jumo and DB series, most often in multi-engine installations like the Jumo.

Total production of the 211 series amounted to 68,248 engines, including 1,046 prototypes and development engines, with a production peak of 1700 engines per month in the autumn of 1942. From 1937 to mid-1944, production was spread between factories in Magdeburg, Köthen, Leipzig, Stettin and Strasburg. It was the most-produced German aviation engine of the World War II years, and was quite likely to have been the first model of German aviation engine selected for "unitizing" as a Kraftei pre-packaged "engine module" – such Kraftei units for the Ju 88A were, as one example, used as to power the Messerschmitt Me 264 V1 competitor for the Amerika Bomber contract in December 1942.

== Variants ==
Powers and rotational speeds are for take-off at sealevel.

Engine model	Power in PS	Power in hp	Power in kW	power at rpm
A (early)	1,000	986	736	2,200
A (late)	1,100	1,085	809	2,300
B,C,D,H,G	1,200	1,184	883	2,400
F,L,M,R	1,340	1,322	986	2,600
J	1,420	1,401	1,044	2,600
N	1,450	1,430	1,067	2,700
P	1,500	1,479	1,103	2,700

== Applications ==
- Avia S-199
- Dornier Do 217 - single engine test aircraft
- Focke-Wulf Ta 154
- Heinkel He 111E, H and Z
- IAR 79
- Junkers F 24kai Jumo 211 test bed
- Junkers Ju 87
- Junkers Ju 88
- Junkers Ju 90
- Junkers Ju 252
- Messerschmitt Me 264 (V1 prototype only, replaced with four BMW 801s)
- Messerschmitt Me 323 (only for tests)
- Savoia-Marchetti SM.79 (Romanian variants)

== Specifications (Jumo 211Ba / 211Da) ==
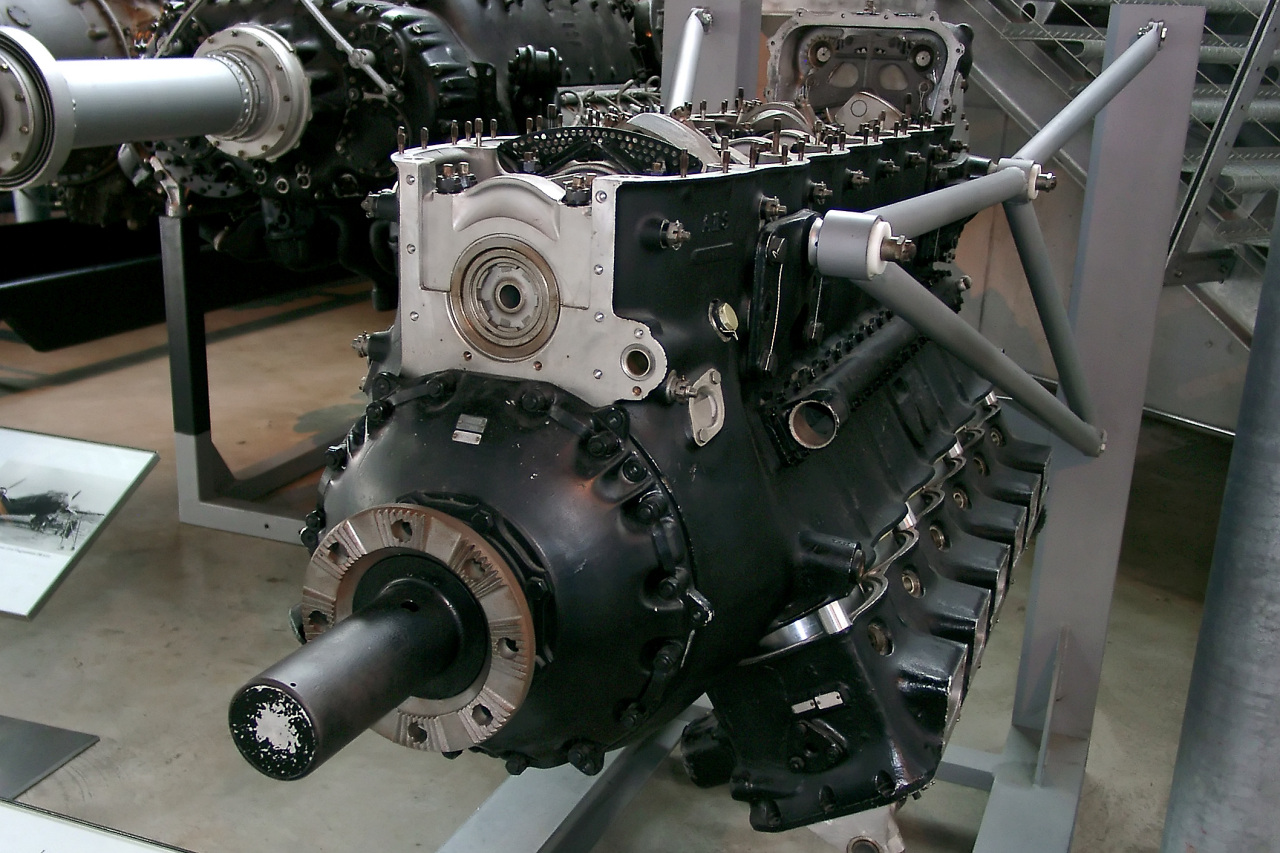
Jumo 211F

Data from Flugzeug-Typenbuch. Handbuch der deutschen Luftfahrt- und Zubehör-Industrie 1944

=== General characteristics ===
- Type: 12-cylinder supercharged liquid-cooled 60-degree inverted V piston aircraft engine
- Bore: 150 mm (5.91 in)
- Stroke: 165 mm (6.50 in)
- Displacement: 35 L (2,135.8 cu in)
- Length: 1,745 mm (68.7 in)
- Width: 804 mm (31.7 in)
- Height: 1,059 mm (41.7 in)
- Dry weight: 640 kg (1,411 lb) dry, unequipped

=== Components ===
- Valvetrain: Overhead camshaft and rockers, 3 valves per cylinder (two inlet and one exhaust)
- Supercharger: Two-speed centrifugal type supercharger with automatic boost control

- 211Ba: 7.82:1 high ratio drive
- 211Da: 11.375:1 high ratio drive

- Fuel system: direct fuel injection
- Fuel type: 87 octane rating gasoline
- Oil system: Pressure feed at 4–6 atm (59–88 psi; 4.1–6.1 bar)
- Cooling system: Liquid-cooled, ethylene glycol

=== Performance ===
- Power output:

- 1,200 PS (1,183.6 hp; 882.6 kW) at 2,400 rpm (1 minute) at sea level
- 1,020 PS (1,006.0 hp; 750.2 kW) at 2,400 rpm (5 minute) at sea level
- 950 PS (937 hp; 699 kW) at 2,300 rpm (30 minute) at sea level
- 800 PS (789 hp; 588 kW) at 2,100 rpm (max. continuous) at sea level
- 660 PS (651 hp; 485 kW) at 2,300 rpm (cruise) at sea level
- 1,025 PS (1,011 hp; 754 kW) at 2,200 rpm at 1,710 m (5,610 ft) supercharger low ratio
- 975 PS (962 hp; 717 kW) at 2,200 rpm ( / ) at 4,200 m (13,780 ft) supercharger high ratio

- Specific power: 34.35 PS/L (0.56 hp/cu in; 25.26 kW/L)
- Compression ratio: 6.5:1
- Specific fuel consumption: 0.214 kg/PSh (0.478 lb/(hp⋅h); 0.291 kg/kWh) at max continuous
- Oil consumption: 0.010–0.015 kg/PSh (0.022–0.034 lb/(hp⋅h); 0.014–0.020 kg/kWh)
- Power-to-weight ratio: 1.894 PS/kg (0.847 hp/lb; 1.393 kW/kg)
- Reduction gear Spur

- 211Ba 0.595:1
- 211Da 0.645:1

- B.M.E.P.: 12.87 atm (13.04 bar; 189.1 psi)

== See also ==
Related development

- Junkers Jumo 213

Comparable engines

- Daimler-Benz DB 601

Related lists

- List of aircraft engines
- List of aircraft engines of Germany during World War II

== Bibliography ==
- Bingham, Victor (1998). Major Piston Aero Engines of World War II. Shrewsbury, UK: Airlife Publishing. ISBN 1-84037-012-2.
- Christopher, John (2013). The Race for Hitler's X-Planes: Britain's 1945 Mission to Capture Secret Luftwaffe Technology. Stroud, UK: History Press. ISBN 978-0-7524-6457-2.
- Gunston, Bill (2006). World Encyclopedia of Aero Engines: From the Pioneers to the Present Day (5th ed.). Stroud, UK: Sutton. ISBN 0-7509-4479-X.
- Kay, Antony (2004). Junkers Aircraft & Engines 1913–1945. London: Putnam Aeronautical Books. ISBN 0-85177-985-9.
