= Avia S-199 =

Czechoslovak fighter aircraft

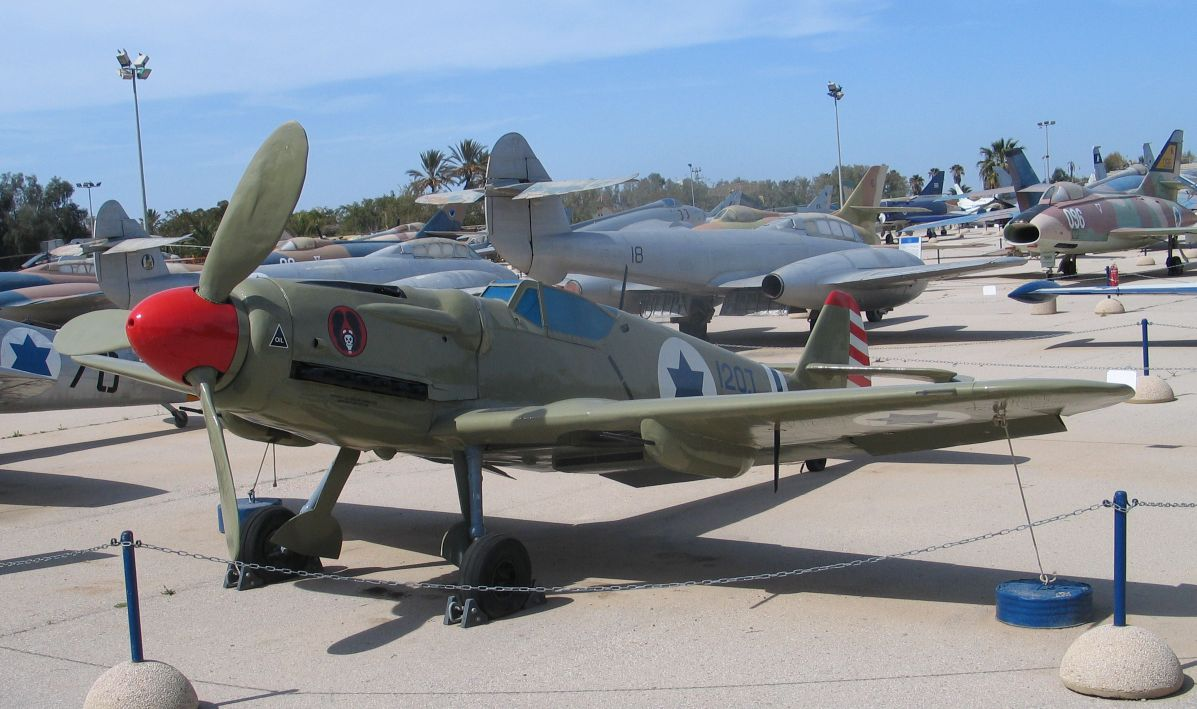
- Avia S-199 Sakeen at the Israeli Air Force Museum, Hatzerim, Israel

General information
- Type: Fighter aircraft
- Manufacturer: Avia
- Designer: Messerschmitt
- Primary users: Czechoslovak Air Force Israeli Air Force
- Number built: 603

History
- Manufactured: 1947–1949
- First flight: March 1947
- Retired: 1957
- Developed from: Messerschmitt Bf 109

The Avia S-199 was a piston-engine, Messerschmitt Bf 109G-based fighter aircraft built in Czechoslovakia after World War II. The Bf 109G airframe and a Junkers Jumo 211F engine were used in place of the original and unavailable Daimler-Benz DB 605 engine. It is notable as the first fighter obtained by the Israeli Air Force, and was used during the 1948 Arab-Israeli War.

Constructed in Czechoslovakia with parts and plans left over from Luftwaffe aircraft production, the aircraft had numerous problems and was generally unpopular with its pilots. Czechoslovak pilots nicknamed it Mezek ("Mule"), while in Israel it was officially known as the Sakeen (סכין, "knife" in Hebrew). In practice, the aircraft was more often called Messerschmitt or Messer (which also means "knife" in German and Yiddish).

== Design and development ==
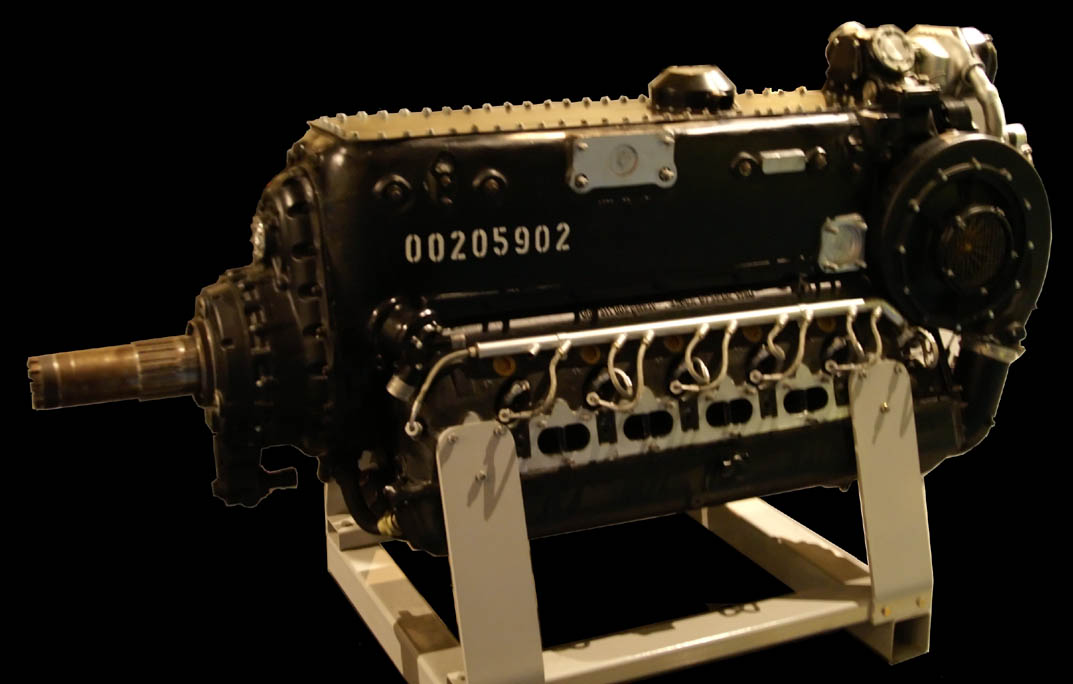
Daimler-Benz DB 605 engine

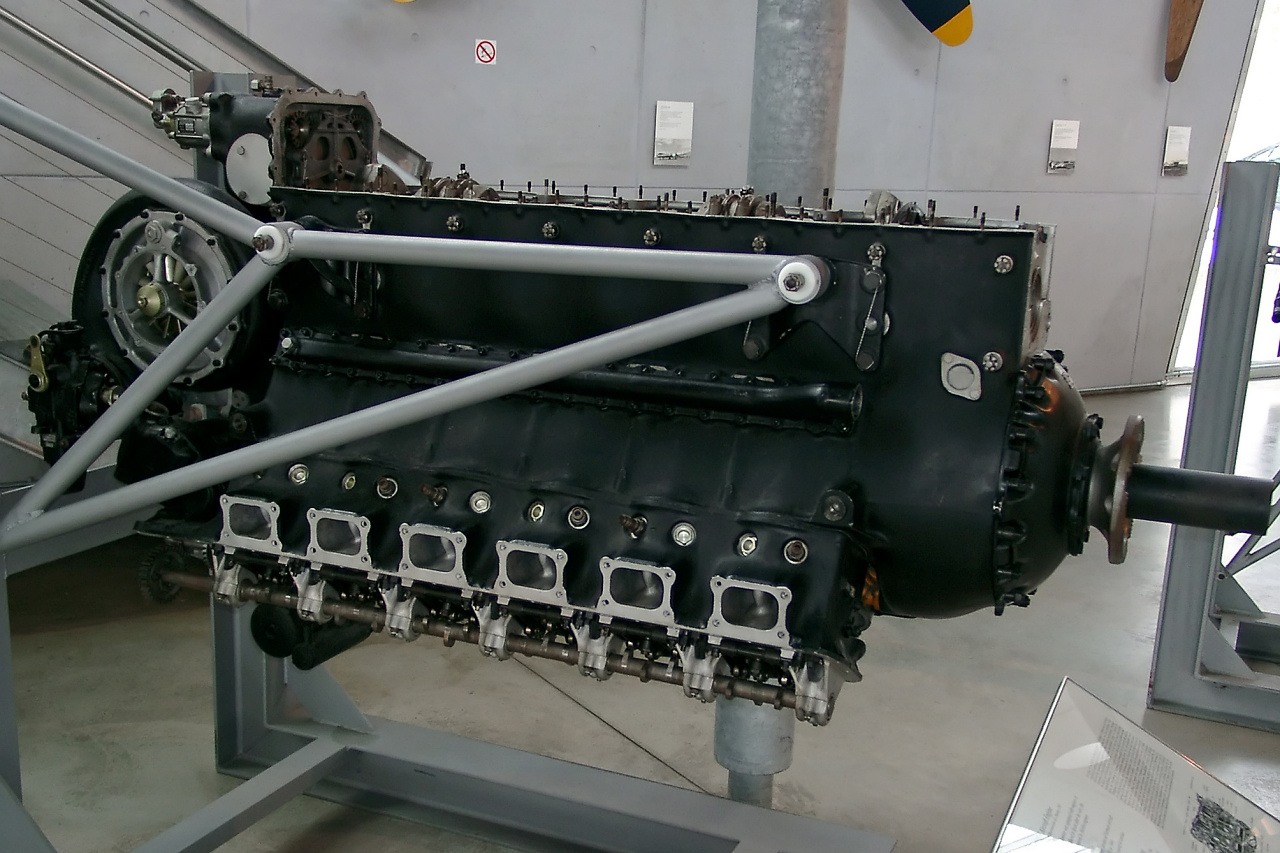
Junkers Jumo 211F engine

Avia continued building Messerschmitt Bf 109G-10s after the war under the Avia S-99 name at two aircraft factories in Czechoslovakia. One of them was officially called závod Avia (Avia Plant) (1946–48) and závod Avia-Jiřího Dimitrova (Avia-George Dimitroff-Plant, 1948–49) in Čakovice near Prague, as a postwar corporative part of the Automobilové závody, n.p. [Automotive Works, National Corp.]. The other was named závod Vysočany (Vysočany Plant, 1948–49) in Prague, as a corporative part of Letecké závody, n.p. [Aviation Works, National Corp.], but soon ran out of the 109's Daimler-Benz DB 605 engines after many were destroyed during an explosion at a warehouse in Krásné Březno.

The S-199 continued to use the Bf 109G airframe, but with none of the original DB 605 engines available, an alternative power unit had to be sourced. It was decided that the aircraft would use the Junkers Jumo 211F engine and same propeller type, both as fitted to the Heinkel He 111 bomber. However, the results were far from satisfactory and the outcome was an aircraft that displayed some quite alarming handling characteristics. The substitute engine with the propeller lacked the responsiveness of the Daimler-Benz unit and the torque created by the massive paddle-bladed propeller made control very difficult. This, in combination with the 109's narrow-track undercarriage, made landings and takeoffs extremely hazardous.

The Daimler-Benz DB 605 engine allowed for a central cannon mount (Motorkanone in German) that fired through the propeller spinner. As the Jumo 211 did not have provision for this, the S-199 used a version of the Rüstsatz VI modification kit. This consisted of a single MG 151 cannon mounted beneath each wing, but this further impaired the aircraft's performance. A final hidden danger lay in the gun synchronizer for the cowl-mounted MG 131 machine guns, which did not function as envisaged, leading to some Israeli pilots shooting off their own propellers.

Despite these drawbacks, around 550 S-199s were built, including a number of conversion trainers designated CS-199 (armed) and C-210 (unarmed). The first flight took place in March 1947, and production ended in 1949. The last examples were withdrawn from Czechoslovak service (with their National Security Guard) in 1957.

== Operational history ==
=== Israeli service ===
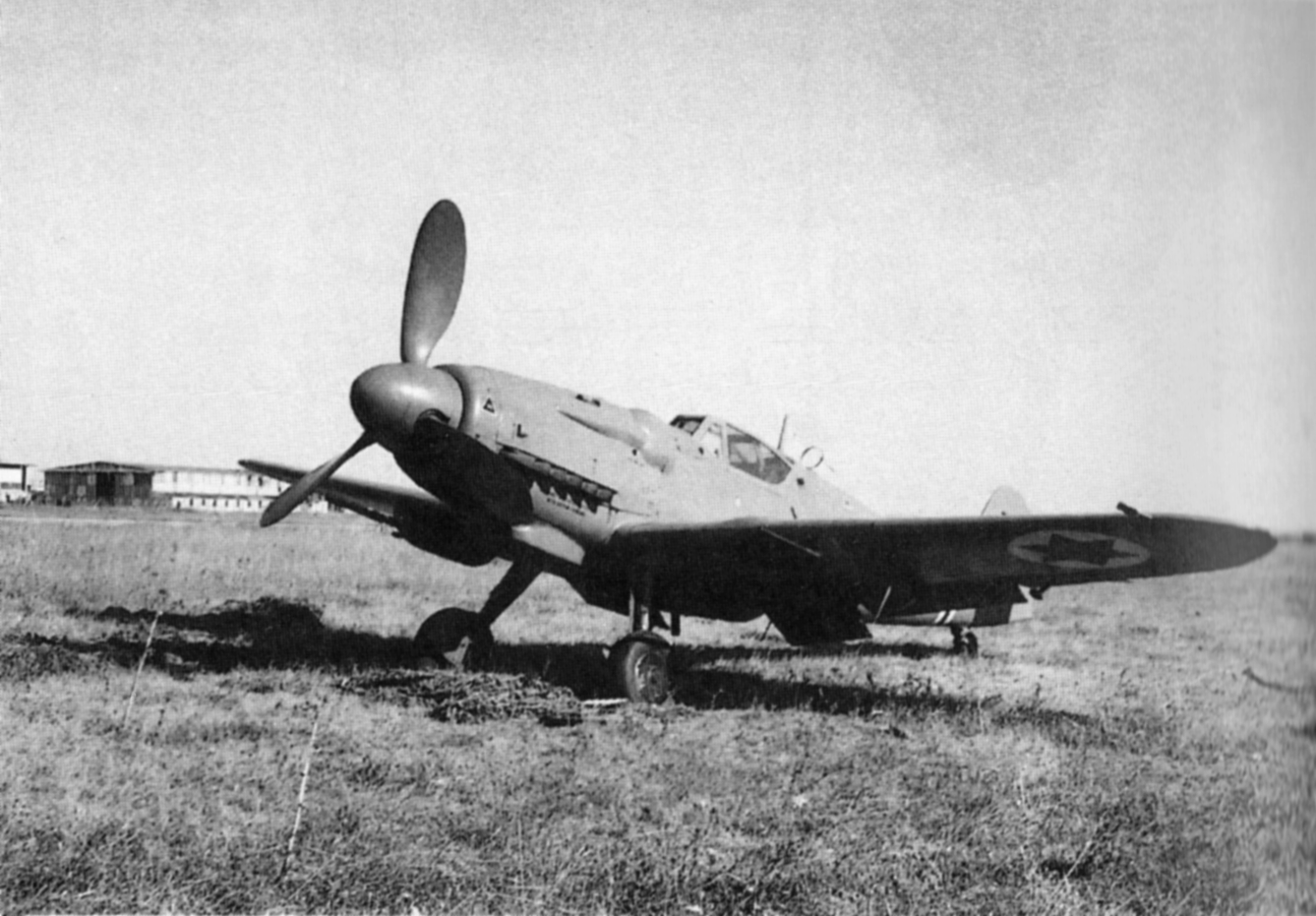
Israeli Avia S-199, 1948

Israeli agents negotiated the purchase of Avia S-199s from the Czechoslovak government in defiance of an arms embargo that Israel faced at the time. Twenty-five aircraft were obtained and all but two were eventually delivered. The price for a fully equipped plane was $190,000. The first four examples arrived on 20 May 1948, six days after Israel's declaration of independence and five days after the commencement of hostilities by Egypt. Forming Israel's first fighter squadron, the four Avias were assembled and sent into combat for the first time on 29 May during Operation Pleshet, attacking the Egyptian army between Isdud and the Ad Halom bridge, south of Tel Aviv. A few days later, on 3 June, taking off from Herzliya Airport the type scored the Israeli Air Force's first aerial victories when Modi Alon shot down two Royal Egyptian Air Force C-47s, which had just bombed Tel Aviv.

The type proved unreliable and performed poorly in combat. Furthermore, maintenance problems meant that no more than five were typically airworthy at any one time. However, Israeli-operated S-199s did score victories over their opponents, including the Spitfire which also equipped the Egyptian Air Force. The Avias were mostly withheld from service by the end of October, when only six remained operational. The S-199 continued making sporadic sorties until mid-December.

== Variants ==
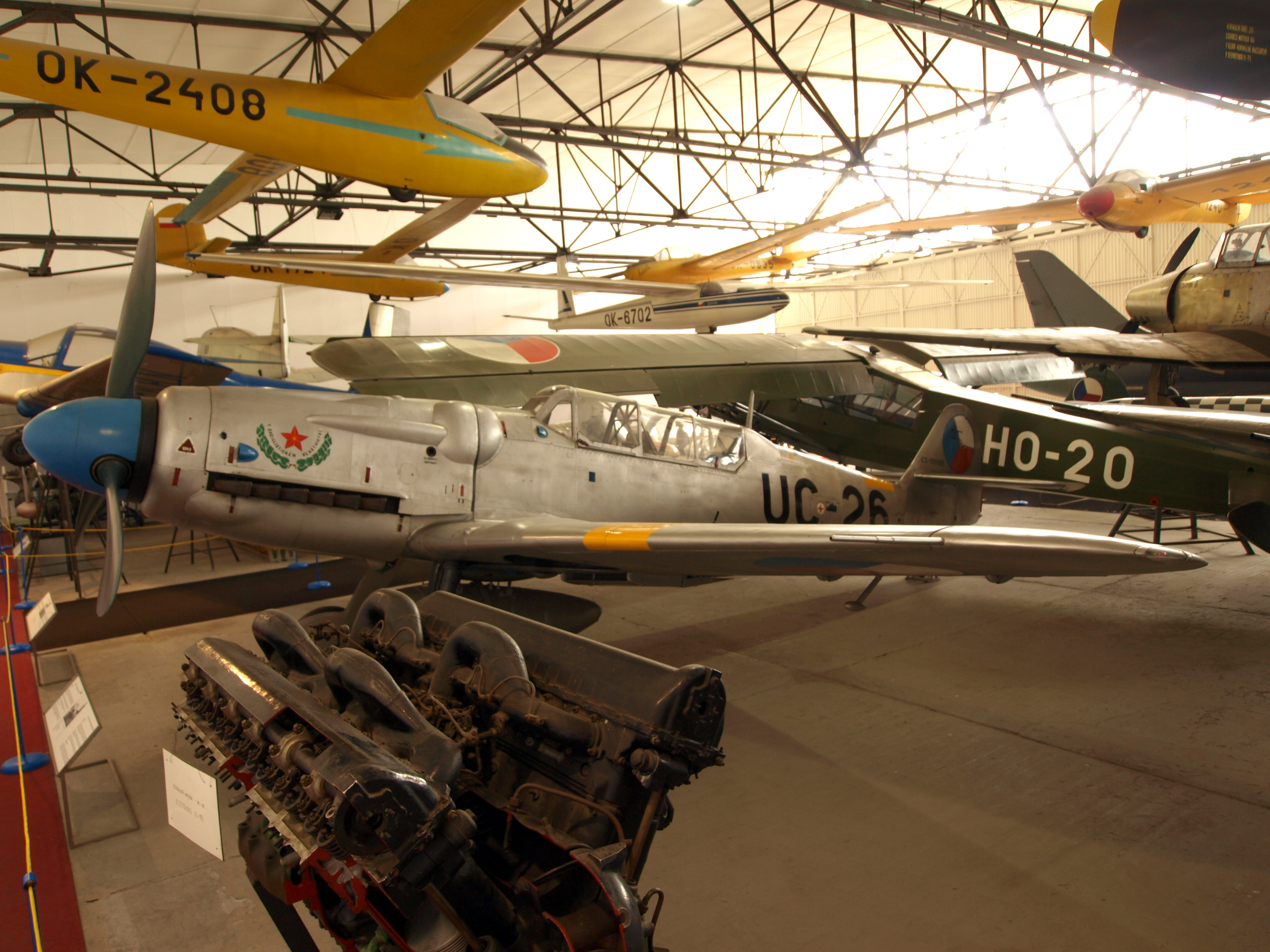
Avia CS-199; Prague Aviation Museum, Kbely

Avia S-99
A Messerschmitt Bf 109G-10 variant assembled postwar in Czechoslovakia, its Avia factory designation was C.10; 21 aircraft were completed.
Avia CS-99
A training variant of Avia S-99 based on the Bf 109G-12 variant, its Avia factory designation was C.10: 23 aircraft were completed.
Avia S-199
The Avia S-99 powered by the Junkers Jumo 211F engine was the main production variant. Its Avia factory designation was C.210, and 559 aircraft were completed.
Avia CS-199
This two-seat training variant was rebuilt from the Avia S-199.
Avia D-199
A reconnaissance version

== Operators ==
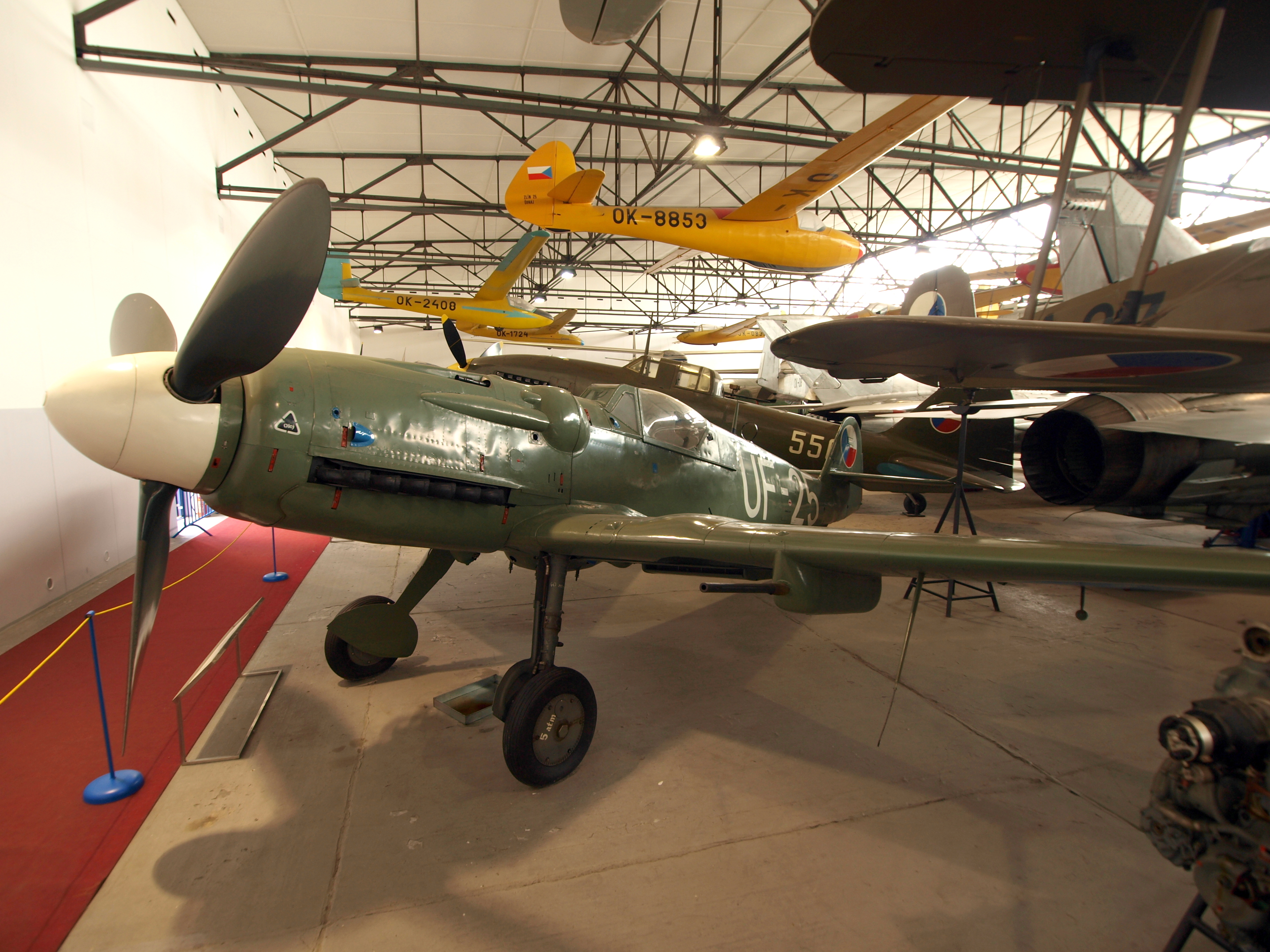
Avia S-199 with Czechoslovak markings.

Czechoslovakia

- Czechoslovak Air Force
- Czechoslovak National Security Guard

Israel

- Israeli Air Force
  - 101 Squadron

== Surviving aircraft ==
Czech Republic

- UC-26 – CS-199 - is on static display at the Kbely Aviation Museum in Kbely, Prague. It is serial number 565.
- UF-25 – S-199 - is on static display at the Prague Aviation Museum in Kbely, Prague. It is serial number 178.

Israel

- D-112 – S-199 - is on static display at the Israeli Air Force Museum at Hatzerim Israeli Air Force Base near Hatzerim, South District.

== Specifications (S-199) ==
Data from The Complete Book of Fighters

General characteristics

- Crew: 1
- Length: 8.94 m (29 ft 4 in)
- Wingspan: 9.92 m (32 ft 7 in)
- Height: 2.59 m (8 ft 6 in)
- Wing area: 16.5 m^{2} (178 sq ft)
- Airfoil: root: NACA 2R1 14.2; tip: NACA 2R1 11.35
- Empty weight: 2,860 kg (6,305 lb)
- Max takeoff weight: 3,736 kg (8,236 lb)
- Powerplant: 1 × Junkers Jumo 211F V-12 inverted liquid-cooled piston engine, 1,010 kW (1,350 hp) for take-off

790 kW (1,060 hp) at 5,300 m (17,400 ft)

- Propellers: 3-bladed paddle-bladed VS 11 constant-speed propeller

Performance

- Maximum speed: 528 km/h (328 mph, 285 kn) at sea level

598 km/h (372 mph; 323 kn) at 6,000 m (20,000 ft)

- Range: 860 km (530 mi, 460 nmi)
- Rate of climb: 13.7 m/s (2,700 ft/min)
- Wing loading: 231 kg/m^{2} (47 lb/sq ft)
- Power/mass: 0.195 hp/lb (0.321 kW/kg)

Armament

- Guns: ** 2 × 13 mm MG 131 machine guns
  - 2 × MG 151/20 cannon
- Bombs: ** 1 × 250 kg (551 lb)

or

  - 4 × 70 kg (155 lb) bombs

== See also ==
Related development

- Messerschmitt Bf 109
- Hispano Aviación HA-1112

Aircraft of comparable role, configuration, and era

- Ikarus S-49
- Supermarine Spitfire
- Yakovlev Yak-9

Related lists

- List of fighter aircraft
