= Herzliya Airport =

Herzliya Modi Alon airport שדה התעופה הרצליה על-שם מודי אלון مطار هرتسيليا
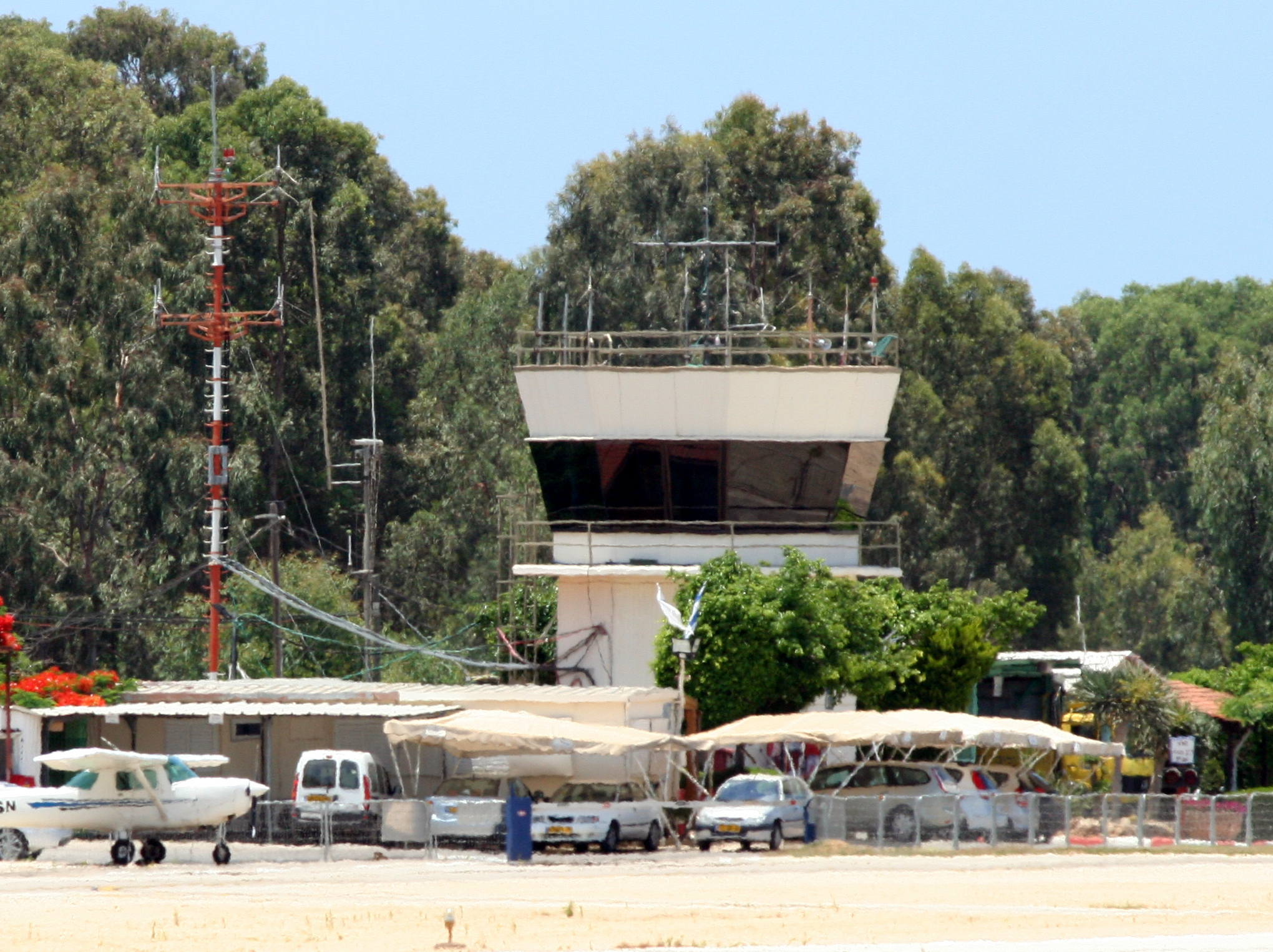
- IATA: none; ICAO: LLHZ

Summary
- Airport type: Public
- Operator: Israeli Airports Authority
- Location: Herzliya
- Elevation AMSL: 121 ft (37 m)
- Coordinates: 32°10′49.03″N 34°50′02.34″E
- Interactive map of Herzliya Modi Alon airport

Runways
Direction	Length		Surface
Direction	ft	m	Surface
10/28	2,963	903	Asphalt

Herzliya Airport (Hebrew: שְׂדֵה הַתְּעוּפָה הֶרְצְלִיָּה Arabic: مطار هرتسيليا, (ICAO: LLHZ) is an airport located in the city of Herzliya in central Israel. The airport is mainly used by flight schools and for general aviation. It has no terminals.

== History ==
During the 1948 Arab–Israeli War, a makeshift strip located around the current airfield, was the main operating base of the Israeli Air Force's 101 "First Fighter" Squadron between June and October 1948, and the squadron moved to it after un-assembled planes were strafed on the ground on May 30. The airfield was used as it was a bit back from the front-lines, and was clandestine since it was a purpose built strip, that was constructed after the beginning of hostilities, in between the orange orchards around Herzliya, and didn't appear on published maps. During these initial operations, the squadron operated with a few planes versus almost complete Arab theater Air supremacy and the airplanes were parked dispersed between the orange trees. The squadron was moved in October to Hatzor Airbase from the strip in due to its unsuitability in rainy conditions, probable loss of clandestine status, moving front lines which made former British bases safe for use, and a shift in the balance of air superiority towards the Israelis.

In early 2008, a new safety system was installed at the airfield. Plans by the Israel Airports Authority and civil aviation managers to expand the airfield southward by 100 dunams (10 hectares) were rejected. Conversely, former Herzliya Mayor Yael German advocated for a complete shut-down of the airport, arguing that its use endangers the local residents. She proposed the land be redeveloped to accommodate the city's growing demand for residential space. The airport was slated to be closed down in April 2015, but was given a six-month extension. It was reported that Haifa Airport was proposed to replace Herzliya Airport, and Herzliya was thus designated a temporary landing strip until a conclusive government decision is made.

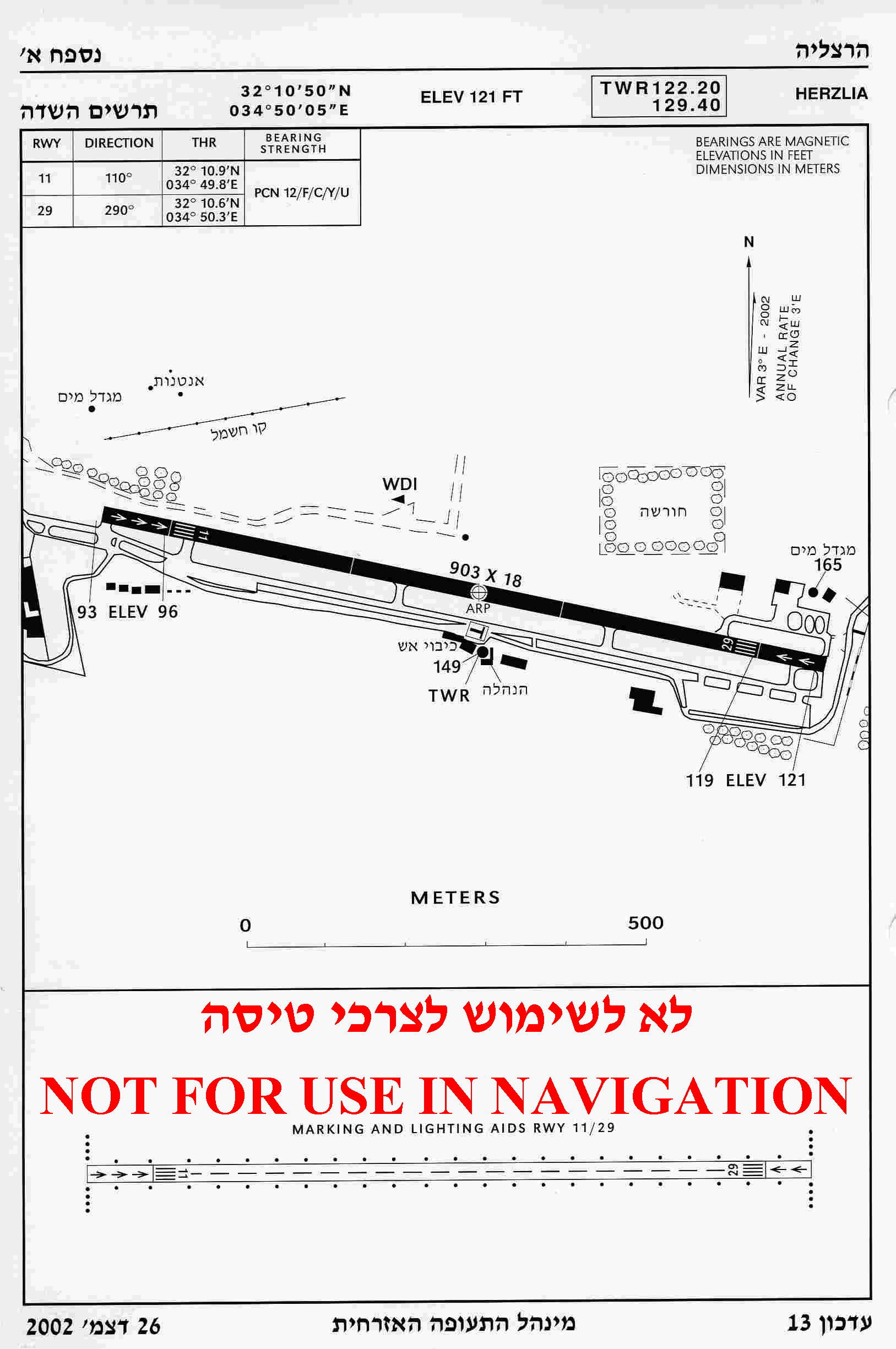
Herzlia Airfield Chart

In December 2015, it was announced that the airport would make way for new residential and industrial space.

In May 2023, runway names were updated from 29/11 to 28/10, due to the yearly change in magnetic variation.
