= Sam Lewis (pilot) =

American-Israeli pilot; first Chief Pilot of El Al

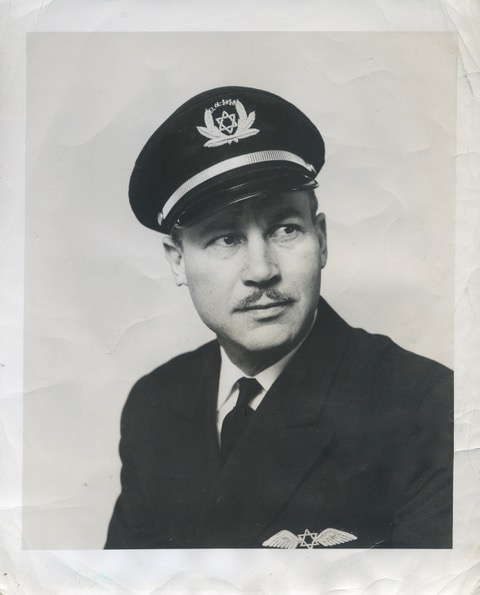
In 1949, Sam Lewis became the first Chief Pilot of El Al

Sam Lewis (February 5, 1912 – February 18, 1992) was an American pilot who flew transport aircraft as a foreign volunteer in Israel's war for independence and as chief pilot for Israel's national airline, El Al.

== Early life ==
Sam Lewis was born Samuel Rifkin on February 5, 1912, in Manhattan in New York City, New York. He was the second child of Louis Rifkin, a furrier, and Anna Rifkin, an amateur Yiddish actress and poet, who immigrated to the US from Mogilev, Russia (now Belarus) in 1910.

In 1925, when Lewis was 13, he accompanied his uncle, Rabbi Gershon Epstein, on a trip to Los Angeles, California, to consider joining the Rabbi's old congregation members who moved there from Russia where he had been their rabbi. Since the uncle only spoke Yiddish, Lewis joined him as his English translator. Lewis was supposed to return to New York by train after leaving his uncle in Los Angeles, but after seeing the wide green open spaces there, he refused to return to the cemented streets of New York. When his parents came to get him, they, too, fell in love with the place and decided to stay. The family settled in the Boyle Heights neighborhood in Los Angeles.

Though Sam grew up helping his father in his fur shop, he had other interests. He was athletic and an amateur boxer, and he loved anything to do with airplanes from an early age. While in high school, Lewis used to go to Clover Field, now Santa Monica Airport, finding different jobs in exchange for an air ride.

In 1935, when Lewis was 22, he had his first solo flight after only four flying lessons. Right after that, he joined the Jewish Flying Club (later the California Flying Club) in Los Angeles, where the members rented airplanes over the weekends and enjoyed flying.

== Early aviation career ==
After accumulating 200 hours of flying, Lewis became a certified flying instructor. In 1937, he left his father's fur shop to work as a flying instructor. He worked for Morton Air Services and then Pacific Air College, both at Mines Field (now LAX) in Los Angeles.

In 1939, as the war was brewing in Europe, Cal Aero, which had a military contract, hired Lewis. This job there was to train flight instructors to teach cadets how to fly aerobatics for combat maneuvers, first at Glendale Airport and then (the future) Ontario Airport in California. He was a Flight Commander and later became a Chief Flight Instructor.

Later, Lewis left Western Airlines and joined TWA in Washington, D.C., as a captain. During the war, TWA had a contract with the Air Force - Contract Carrier Twelve, and Lewis joined the Air Transport Command (ATC) - flying cargo for the military, first in B-24 and then advanced to Boeing 307 - the Stratoliner. He estimated that he did more than 100 ocean crossings for the Air Force through TWA to Europe, South Africa, South America, and Asia.

== Israeli aviation career ==
Sam Lewis' logbook: Pages 1,2: June, July 1948 - Operation Zebra. Page 3: March 1948 - Operation Magic Carpet.

In 1947, Al Schwimmer, a former TWA flight engineer, recruited Lewis and other pilots to Machal for Operation Zebra. The team smuggled weapons through Czechoslovakia to help Israel during the 1948 Palestine war and participated in aerial attacks against the local Arabs. Their actions violated the American arms embargo on Palestine and the Middle East, and in 1949, Lewis and his friends returned to the US to face their trial. Their exploits during Operation Zebra were documented in the 2015 film A Wing and a Prayer.

In 1949, Lewis became the first Chief Pilot of EL AL, the Israeli airline. He worked there until his mandatory retirement at the age of 60, in 1972.

In late 1948 the Israeli government with the help of the JDC, an American Jewish relief organization, hired Alaska Airlines to airlift Jewish refugees from Yemen to Israel. In early 1949, Lewis took a leave of absence from his job in EL AL to join Alaska Airlines to take part in this airlift, which was later recognized as Operation Magic Carpet or On the Wings of Eagles. The airlift from Yemen came to completion in September 1950, after airlifting to Israel 49,000 Yemeni Jews.

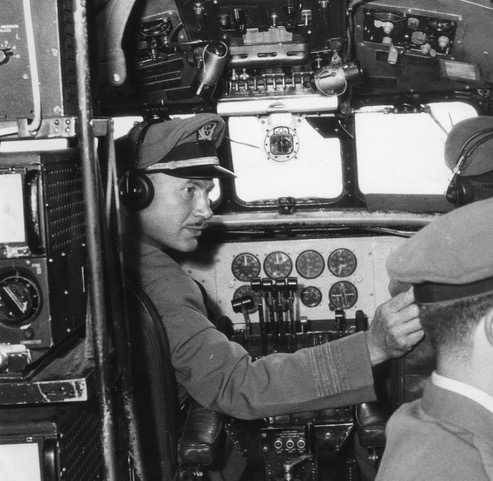
Sam Lewis in a publicity photo for EL AL in 1950

After his mandatory retirement as an EL AL pilot at the age of 60, Lewis, who was not ready yet to give up flying, joined his friend Al Schwimmer at the Israeli Aircraft Industry (IAI). He worked there as a pilot and consultant and helped to set up several airlines in Europe, Asia, and South America. He remained with IAI until 1980.

== Trial ==
In late 1948, Lewis and his nine American friends in Operation Zebra learned that their actions incurred US charges that they violated the American arms embargo on Palestine and the Middle East. In 1949 Lewis and his friends returned to the US to face their trial. The trials of Lewis and some of the members of Operation Zebra took place in Los Angeles, having the Jewish Agency provide them with legal services. The trial ended in early 1950. Lewis was the only defendant found not guilty, due to one juror insisting Lewis was just a hired pilot, not a conspirator. The rest received $10,000 fines, which the Jewish Agency paid, and only one – Charlie Winters, who was not Jewish – whose trial took place in New York, was sentenced to 18 months in prison. Three of the convicts in the Operation Zebra trial were eventually pardoned by various US presidents.

== Personal life ==
On May 5, 1931, when he was 19, Lewis married his high school sweetheart and next-door neighbor Jenny (Jean) Kopf. In 1933, the couple welcomed their first-born daughter Sandra (Brown), and later, in 1941, they had their second daughter Elaine (Aronoff). They lived in Los Angeles, New York, and Washington, DC, during WWII. When Sam was able to join El Al after the trial, they began their life in Israel in 1950 and lived a few years in London. Upon Lewis’ retirement from IAI, the couple moved back to Los Angeles in 1982 and remained there until their deaths. On February 18, 1992, Lewis died in Los Angeles, California, of an accidental gunshot wound.

== In popular culture ==
Lewis acted as an informal consultant to the movie Cast a Giant Shadow (1966), depicting the events of Israel's War of Independence in 1948.

The exploits of Lewis and his Machal friends during Israel's War of Independence were documented in the movies:

- They Were All We Had (1988) by Jonathan Paz
- A Wing and a Prayer (2015) by Boaz Dvir,

And the books

- The Secret Battle for Israel (1966) by Benjamin Kagan
- The Pledge (1970) by Leonard Slater
- The Secret Army (1984) by David J. Bercuson
- El Al Star in the Sky (1990) by Marvin G. Goldman
- Angels in the Sky (2017) by Robert Gandt
- Saving Israel (2020) by Boaz Dvir
