= Al Schwimmer =

Israeli aerospace engineer and businessman (1917-2011)

- אל שווימר
- Schwimmer in 1955
- Born: June 10, 1917; New York City, U.S.
- Died: June 10, 2011 (aged 94); Ramat Gan, Israel
- Citizenship: United States; Israel
- Occupations: Aerospace engineer, aerospace executive
- Known for: Founder of Israel Aerospace Industries (formerly Bedek Aviation Company)
- Spouse: Rina Schwimmer
- Children: 2
- Awards: Israel Prize (2006)

Adolph William Schwimmer (Hebrew: אל שווימר; June 10, 1917 – June 10, 2011) was an American-born Israeli pilot, aerospace engineer, and businessman. After serving as an engineer in the Army Air Transport Command during World War II, he provided crucial, albeit illegal support to what would become the Israeli Air Force by smuggling American warplanes to Israel during its war of independence. After immigrating to Israel in 1951, he founded and became the first CEO of Israel Aerospace Industries.

== Early life ==
In 1917, Schwimmer was born in New York City, the son of immigrants from Eastern Europe. Schwimmer never used his given birth name of Adolph, preferring the nickname "Al".

== Career ==
In 1939, Schwimmer began his aerospace career at Lockheed Corporation as an engineer and also received his civilian pilot license. During World War II, he worked for TWA and assisted the U.S. Air Transport Command as a flight engineer.

During the 1948 Arab–Israeli War, Schwimmer became a Mahal operative, using his World War II experience and his contacts to smuggle 30 surplus war planes to Israel in violation of an arms embargo imposed by President Harry S. Truman. Schwimmer also recruited pilots and crew, mostly World War II veterans, to fly circuitous routes to land the planes in Israel. The Boeing B-17 Flying Fortresses were smuggled by way of the Azores to Czechoslovakia, then to Israel. Using the planes, the Israeli Air Force would bombard a residential neighborhood near Qasr al-Qubba in Cairo on July 15, 1948, during the international phase of the 1948 Palestine war.

Schwimmer reflected on what motivated these actions in an interview with Boaz Dvir. He described the alternative as allowing a "Second Holocaust" to happen, saying, "I believed those 600,000 Jews were going to die."

In 1949, Schwimmer returned to the United States and, in 1950, he was convicted of violating the US Neutrality Acts for smuggling the planes into Israel. Schwimmer was stripped of his voting rights and veterans benefits and fined $10,000, but did not receive a prison sentence. Schwimmer refused to ask for a pardon, believing that smuggling weapons to help create Israel was the right moral decision to make. In 2001, President Bill Clinton gave Schwimmer a presidential pardon.

In the early 1950s, Schwimmer, who was running an aircraft maintenance company in Burbank, California, was approached by David Ben-Gurion, Israel's then prime minister, who asked Schwimmer to return to Israel and establish an aircraft company for commercial and military purposes. Schwimmer acceded to Ben Gurion's request and founded Israel Aerospace Industries (IAI), of which he became the first CEO. When Schwimmer retired in 1988, IAI was the largest company in Israel, valued at $1 billion. Sam Lewis, a former codefendant, worked for him as a pilot and consultant and helped set up several airlines in Europe, Asia, and South America.

Schwimmer was one of the founders of Savyon, but later moved to Tel Aviv.

== Atlantic Northern Airlines v. Schwimmer ==
Schwimmer's name is attached to a significant court case, Atlantic Northern Airlines v. Schwimmer. In 1948, he arranged for the Jewish Agency for Israel to charter a Douglas C-54 aircraft from an American carrier, Atlantic Northern Airlines (ANA), which flew arms from Europe to Israel. The contract ended at the end of summer, but Israel nonetheless retained the aircraft, with the Israeli Air Force crashing it on a beach near Tel Aviv in January 1949. An Israeli organization compensated ANA for the loss of the aircraft, and ANA signed a general release, but then later sued Schwimmer personally for allegedly unpaid rent. Schwimmer prevailed, but only after the case went to the Supreme Court of New Jersey, which set a widely cited precedent for the use of evidence with contracts.

== Political activity ==
In the mid-1980s, Schwimmer was a special adviser for technology and industry for Israel's then-Prime Minister Shimon Peres, who became a close friend. In this capacity, Schwimmer was an intermediary between the U.S. and Iran during the Lebanon hostage crisis to trade American and Israeli weapons to Iran for the release of American hostages held by pro-Iranian groups in Lebanon.

In the 1990s, Schwimmer was involved in the movement to codify Israel's constitution, together with a bill to give equality to all branches of Judaism.

== Personal life ==
Schwimmer was married and had two children, Danny and Dafna, as well as four grandchildren, Orr, Ella, Sarah, and Avi. On June 10, 2011, Schwimmer died on his 94th birthday in a hospital in Ramat Gan, Tel Aviv District, Israel.

== Legacy ==
Schwimmer has been called the father of the Israeli Air Force. David Ben-Gurion described his actions as the most important diaspora contribution to the survival of the state of Israel.

In 2015, his exploits during 1948 Arab–Israeli War were depicted in the PBS documentary A Wing and a Prayer, written, directed, and produced by Boaz Dvir. The film contains the only public interview Schwimmer gave in light of these events.

== Awards ==
- In 1975, he was awarded the Herzl Prize for his contribution to Israel's security and economy.
- In 2006, Schwimmer was awarded the Israel Prize for his lifetime achievement and special contribution to society and the State.
- In 2018, Schwimmer was posthumously honored by the Embassy of Israel in Washington, D.C., as one of the 70 most valuable American contributors to the strengthening of Israel and its alliance with the United States.

== See also ==
- List of Israel Prize recipients
- List of people pardoned by Bill Clinton
