= Israeli bombing of Cairo =

1948 attack by Israel

1948 Israeli bombing of Cairo
- Part of the 1948 Arab–Israeli War
- Location: Cairo, Egypt
- Date: July 15, 1948
- Deaths: 30 Egyptian civilians
- Perpetrator: Israeli Air Force: 69 Squadron

The Israeli Air Force bombarded a residential neighborhood near Qasr al-Qubba in Cairo on July 15, 1948, during the international phase of the 1948 Palestine war. The attack was carried out during the breaking of the fast of Ramadan and killed 30 civilians and destroyed many homes. It led to an angry march on the Jewish quarter.

== Background ==
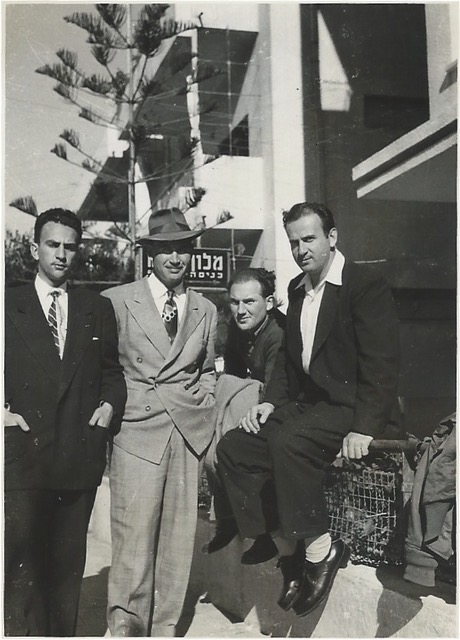
Al Schwimmer and others in Tel Aviv in 1949.

Before the establishment of the State of Israel, the Haganah had ordered three Boeing B-17 Flying Fortress planes from the United States through US Mahal operative Al Schwimmer. The heavy bomber planes were prepared for combat by Mahal recruit Ray Kurtz. They were acquired during the truce and smuggled from Czechoslovakia in violation of an arms embargo.

== Attacks on Egyptian targets ==
The 69 Squadron of the Israeli Air Force was flying the planes, which were ordered to strike Egyptian targets on the way from Czechoslovakia. The air operation attempted to bomb King Farouq's Abdeen Palace. One plane went to Cairo but failed to hit the palace. The bombing struck a residential neighborhood during Iftar, killing 30 Egyptians and striking a rail line. According to Al-Ahram the following day, the bombardment happened at 7:55 pm.

The two other planes were supposed to strike el-ʻArīsh but bombed Rafah instead.

== Results ==
The bombardment killed 30 Egyptians, struck a rail line, and led to an angry march on a Jewish quarter in Cairo.

The bombardment raised morale in Tel Aviv.

== Aftermath ==
In the heightened tensions following the attack, a series of bombings targeted Jewish businesses and institutions in Cairo, including the Cicurel Department Store of the Cicurel family.

== See also ==
- Israeli war crimes
- Killings and massacres during the 1948 Palestine war
