= 1948 Palestine war =

First Israeli–Arab war

- Part of the intercommunal conflict in Mandatory Palestine, the Arab–Israeli conflict, and the Israeli–Palestinian conflict
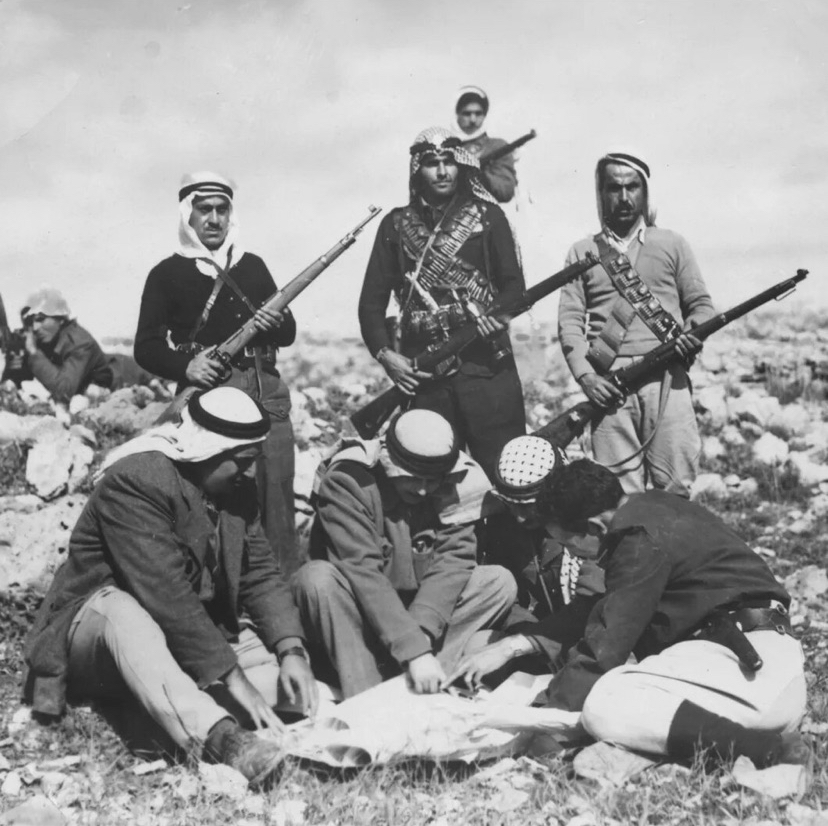
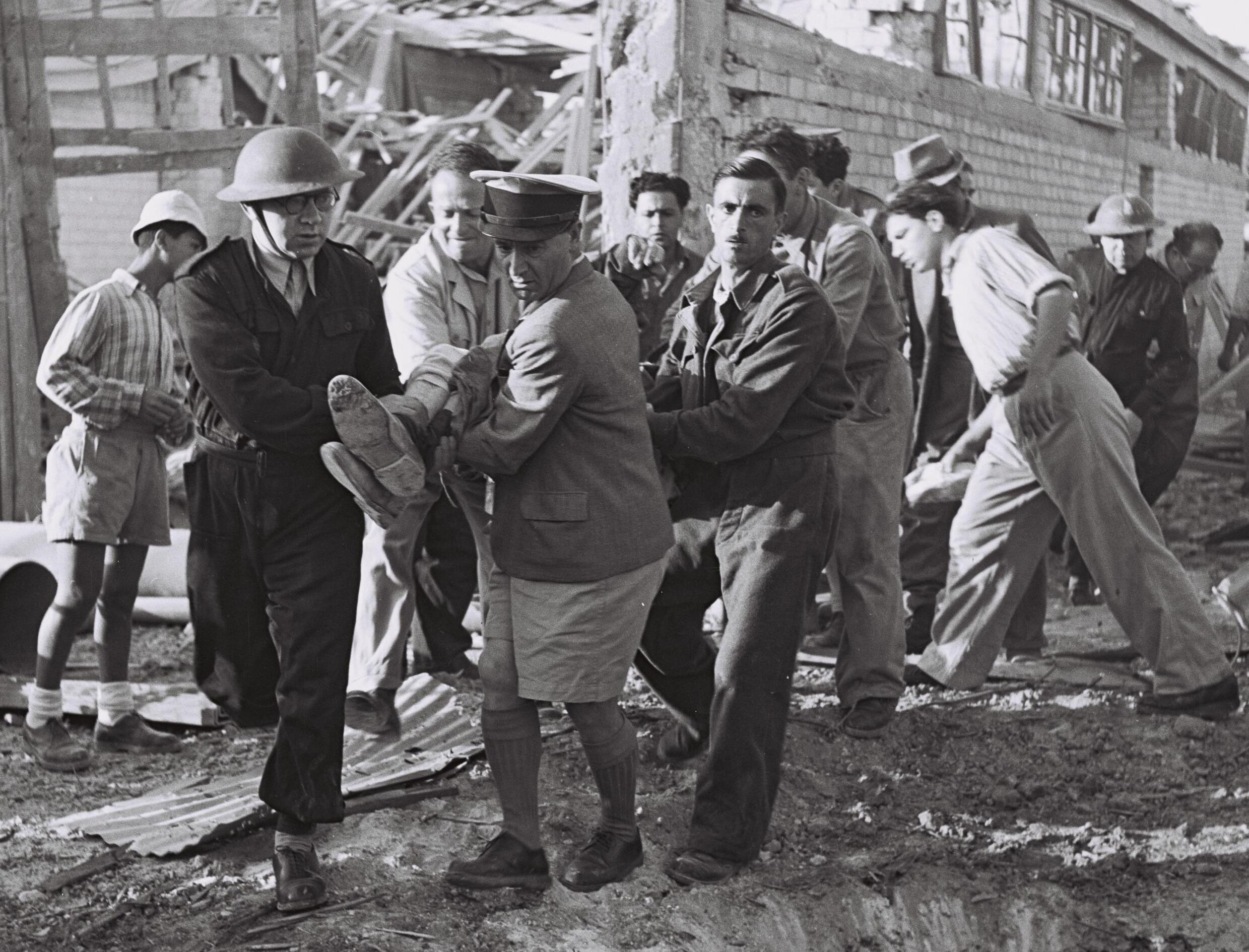
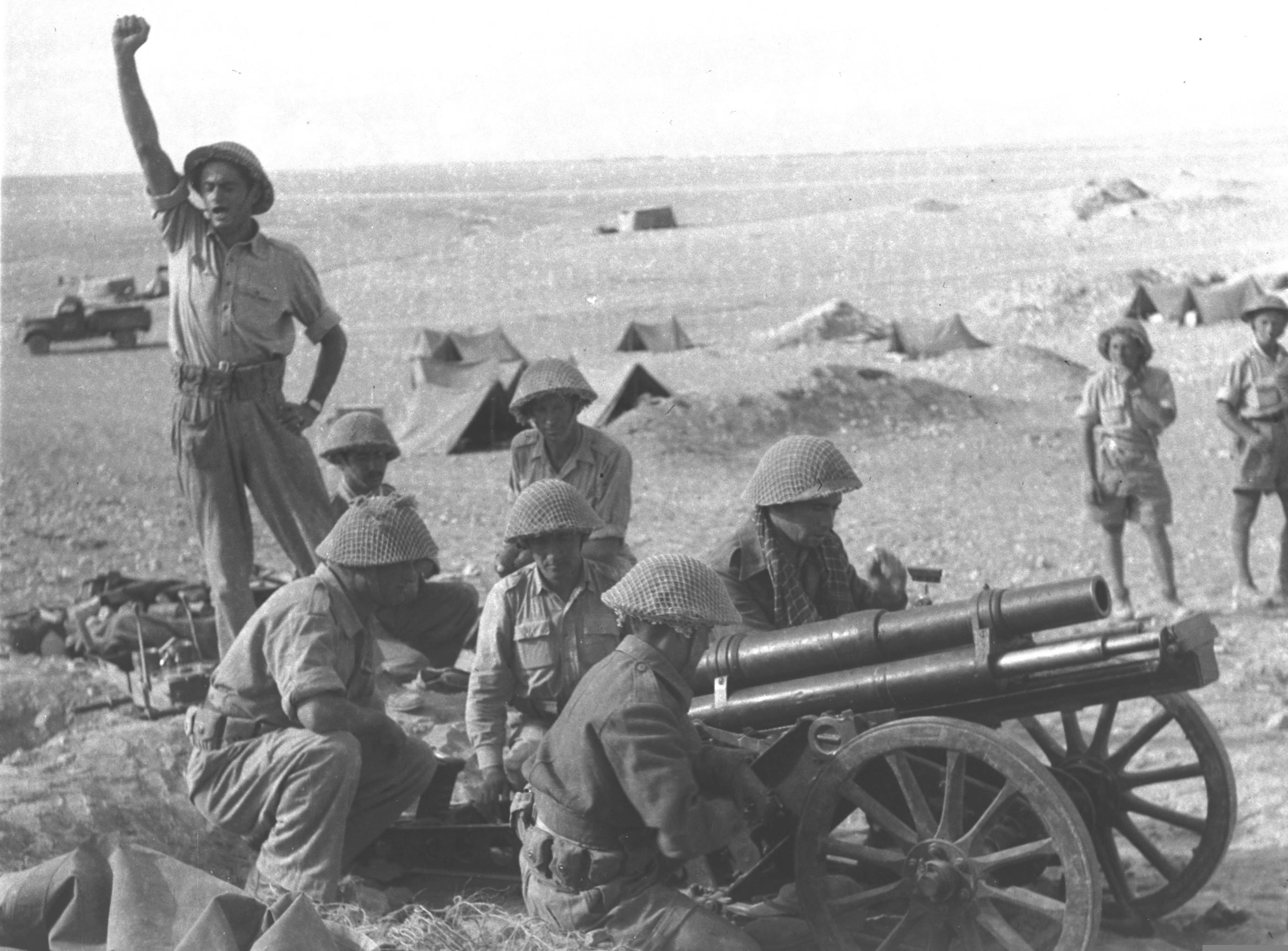
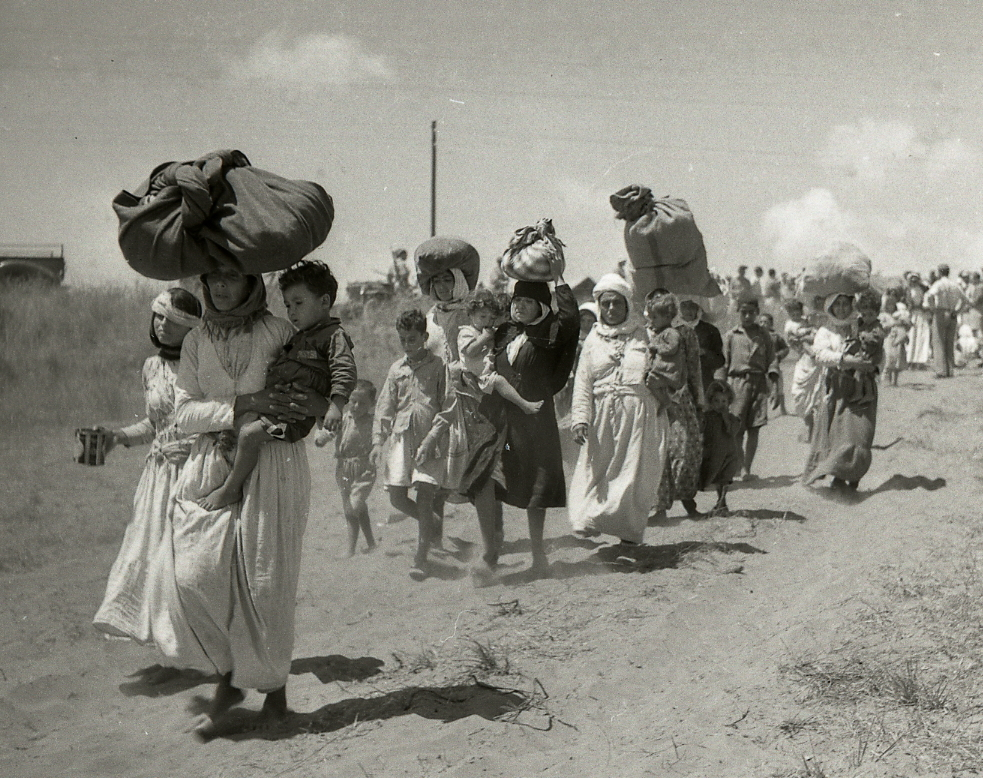
- From top to bottom, left to right: Abd al-Qadir al-Husayni with fellow fighters from the Holy War Army; Haganah personnel carry a man wounded by the Egyptian bombing of Tel Aviv; Jewish soldiers from the Palmach with artillery; Expulsion of Palestinians from the village of Tantura
Date	30 November 1947 – 20 July 1949 (1 year, 7 months, 2 weeks and 6 days)
Location	Mandatory Palestine, Sinai Peninsula, southern Lebanon
Result	Israeli victory; Transjordanian partial victory; Palestinian defeat; Hundreds of thousands of Arabs flee or are expelled to the Gaza Strip, the West Bank and surrounding Arab states, forming the start of the Palestinian refugee crisis; Beginning of the Palestinian Fedayeen insurgency; Arab League defeat; Hundreds of thousands of Jews flee or are expelled from Arab countries, largely settling in Israel; Arab League boycott of Israel; 1949 Armistice Agreements signed
Territorial changes	Establishment of the State of Israel; Annexation of the West Bank by Transjordan (including East Jerusalem); Occupation of the Gaza Strip by Egypt and establishment of the All-Palestine Government; Syrian foothold established to the north and south of the Sea of Galilee

Belligerents
Yishuv (before 14 May 1948); Israel (after 14 May 1948) Before 26 May 1948: Haganah; Palmach; Hish; HIM; Irgun; Lehi; Druze militants; Allied Bedouin tribes; After 26 May 1948: Israel Defense Forces; Sword Battalion; Foreign volunteers: Mahal	Arab Higher Committee (before 15 May 1948); Arab League (after 15 May 1948): Arab League: Egypt; All-Palestine Protectorate (after 22 September 1948); Transjordan; Syria; Iraq; Lebanon; Saudi Arabia; Yemen; Irregulars: Al-Najjada; Holy War Army; Arab Liberation Army; Muslim Brotherhood; Foreign volunteers: (Note: Volunteers from Albania, SR Bosnia and Herzegovina, and SR Croatia.)	United Kingdom; Mandatory Palestine (before 15 May 1948)

Commanders and leaders
(Israel) David Ben-Gurion; (Israel) Chaim Weizmann; (Israel) Yigael Yadin; (Israel) Yaakov Dori; (Israel) David Shaltiel; (Israel) Moshe Dayan; (Israel) Yisrael Galili; (Israel) Yigal Allon; (Israel) Yitzhak Rabin; (Israel) Moshe Carmel; (Israel) Aharon Remez; (Israel) Mickey Marcus †; (Israel) Gershon Zak; (Israel) Shlomo Shamir	Amin al-Husseini; Abdul Qadir al-Husayni †; Hasan Salama †; (Arab League) Azzam Pasha; (Arab League) Fawzi al-Qawuqji; (Jordan) Abdullah I; (Jordan) John Bagot Glubb; (Jordan) Habis Majali; (Egypt) Farouk I; (Egypt) Ahmed Ali al-Mwawi; (Egypt) Mohamed Naguib	(Mandatory Palestine) Gordon MacMillan

Strength
Israel: c. 10,000 initially, rising to 115,000 by March 1949	Arabs: c. 2,000 initially, rising to 70,000; Egypt: 10,000 initially; later 20,000; Iraq: 3,000 initially; later 15,000–18,000; Syria: 2,500–5,000; Transjordan: 8,000–12,000; Lebanon: 1,000; Saudi Arabia: 800–1,200; Arab Liberation Army: 3,500–6,000	British Security Forces: 70,000

Casualties and losses
USSOC historian Stanley Sandler estimates 6,373 killed (about 4,000 troops and 2,373 civilians) Benny Morris writes that 5,700– 5,800 were killed.	Between 5,000 and 20,000 (including civilians and armed irregulars), among which 4,000 soldiers for Egypt, Jordan and Syria; other estimate: 15,000 Arab dead and 25,000 wounded. (Note: Aref al-Aref gives the number of Palestinian deaths as 13,000, with the majority of that number being civilians. Ilan Pappé writes that "a few thousand died in massacres." Benny Morris estimates total Palestinian losses at +5,800, and that around 800 civilians and prisoners of war were massacred.)	

The 1948 Palestine war (Note: Palestinians consider the events of 1948 to be part of the Nakba (Arabic: النَكْبَة), literally 'the catastrophe'. In Israel it is called the War of Independence (Hebrew: מלחמת העצמאות; Milkhemet Ha'Atzma'ut).) (30 November 1947 – 10 March 1949), known in Palestine as the Nakba and in Israel as the War of Independence, was fought in the territory of what had been, at the start of the war, British-ruled Mandatory Palestine. It began as a civil war between the Arab and Jewish communities following the United Nations Partition Plan and became an international conflict with the Declaration of the Establishment of the State of Israel, (Note: On the afternoon of 14 May 1948, David Ben-Gurion, executive head of the Zionist Organization and chairman of the Jewish Agency for Palestine, proclaimed the establishment of a Jewish state in Palestine to be known as the State of Israel.) the termination of the British mandate, and the entry of the armies of neighbouring Arab states into the new state of Israel. During the war, Israeli forces (Note: The paramilitary organizations Haganah, Irgun, and Lehi fought on behalf of the Yishuv until late May 1948, when the Israel Defense Forces (IDF) were established and the other Jewish armed forces were disbanded. There was also support from overseas volunteers, known as the Mahal.) conquered about 78% of the former territory of the mandate, contributing, with other factors, to the expulsion and flight of over 700,000 Palestinians. Transjordan took control of the territory west of the Jordan River and Egypt occupied the coastal territory around and incluiding Gaza. The war formally ended with the 1949 Armistice Agreements, which established the Green Line de facto borders of the State of Israel, the West Bank, and the Gaza Strip. It was the first war of the Israeli–Palestinian conflict and the broader Arab–Israeli conflict.

The war had two main phases, the first being the 1947–1948 civil war, which began on 30 November 1947, a day after the United Nations voted to adopt the Partition Plan for Palestine, which planned for the division of the territory into Jewish and Arab sovereign states. During this period, the British still maintained a declining rule over Palestine and occasionally intervened in the violence. Initially on the defensive, the Zionist forces switched to the offensive in April 1948. In anticipation of an invasion by Arab armies, they enacted Plan Dalet, an operation aimed at securing territory for the establishment of a Jewish state.

The second phase of the war began on 14 May 1948, with the declaration of the establishment of the State of Israel and the termination of the British Mandate at midnight. The following morning, the surrounding Arab armies invaded Palestine, beginning the 1948 Arab–Israeli War. The Egyptians advanced in the south-east while the Jordanian Arab Legion and Iraqi forces captured the central highlands. Syria and Lebanon fought against the Israeli forces in the north. The newly formed Israel Defense Forces managed to halt the Arab forces and in the following months began pushing them back and capturing territory.

During the war, massacres and acts of terror were conducted by both sides. A campaign of massacres and violence against the Arab population, such as occurred at Lydda and Ramle and the Battle of Haifa, led to the expulsion and flight of over 700,000 Palestinians, with most of their urban areas being depopulated and destroyed. This violence and dispossession is remembered by Palestinians as the Nakba (Arabic for "the catastrophe") and resulted in the beginning of the Palestinian refugee problem. Hundreds of thousands of Jews fled or were expelled from Arab states in the three years following the Arab defeat in the war, over 260,000 of which settled in Israel.

== Terminology and alternate names ==
The 1948 Palestine war is also sometimes referred to as the 1948 Arab–Israeli war, the First Arab–Israeli war, or simply the 1948 war, although the term "Arab-Israeli war" often refers to the international phase of the war between Arab countries and Israel after May 15, 1948. Palestinians and the Arab world often refer to the war as the Nakba ("the catastrophe"), while in Israel the conflict is known as the War of Independence (Milhemet Ha'atzma'ut).

== Background ==
The 1948 war came as the culmination of 30 years of friction between Jews and Arabs during the period of British rule of Palestine when, under the terms of the League of Nations mandate held by the British, conditions intended to lead to the establishment of a Jewish National Home in the area were created.

=== Jewish immigration to Palestine ===
Zionism formed in Europe as the national movement of the Jewish people. It sought to reestablish Jewish statehood in the ancient homeland. The first wave of Zionist immigration, dubbed the First Aliyah, lasted from 1882 to 1903. Some 30,000 Jews, mostly from the Russian Empire, reached Ottoman Palestine. They were driven both by the Zionist idea and by the wave of antisemitism in Europe, especially in the Russian Empire, which came in the form of brutal pogroms. They wanted to establish Jewish agricultural settlements and a Jewish majority in the land that would allow them to gain statehood.

The Arab inhabitants of Ottoman Palestine who saw the Zionist Jews of the first aliyah settle next to them were not associated with a national movement at the end of the 19th century. Historically, Palestine had never been administered or recognized as a distinct province by any of its Muslim rulers.

Starting in 1882, the Ottomans issued a stream of "restrictive orders" against Jewish settlement and land purchases in Palestine. However, as a result of its perceived insignificance and the inefficiency of Ottoman bureaucracies, these restrictions had little effect. Due to bribes, the Ottoman authorities often supported the Jewish settlers with "entry permits and their extension, land deals, [and] building rights."

Until the 1910s, Zionists encountered little violence, as the Arabs lacked political awareness and were disorganized. Between 1909 and 1914, this changed, as Arabs killed 12 Jewish settlement guards and Arab nationalism, and opposition to the Zionist enterprise, increased. In 1911, Arabs attempted to thwart the establishment of a Jewish settlement in the Jezreel Valley, and the dispute resulted in the death of one Arab man and a Jewish guard. The Arabs called the Jews the "new Crusaders", and anti-Zionist (and, occasionally, anti-Semitic) (Note: Source quotes several examples, such as a poem printed in the newspaper Falastin: "The Jews, the weakest of all peoples and the least of them, Are haggling with us for our land.") rhetoric flourished.

=== World War I and the Balfour Declaration ===
During the war, Palestine served as the frontline between the Ottoman Empire and the British Empire in Egypt. The war briefly halted Jewish-Arab friction. The British invaded the land in 1915 and 1916 after two unsuccessful Ottoman attacks on Sinai. They were assisted by the Arab tribes in Hejaz, led by the Hashemites, and promised them sovereignty over the Arab areas of the Ottoman Empire. Palestine was excluded from the promise, initially intended to be a joint British-French domain.

After the Balfour Declaration in November 1917, it was designated as a "national home for the Jewish people", with the stipulation that "nothing shall be done which may prejudice the civil and religious rights of existing non-Jewish communities in Palestine." Several factors influenced the decision to support Zionism. Zionist lobbying, led by Chaim Weizmann, played a significant role, along with religious and humanitarian motivations. The fact that the Arabs of Palestine supported the Ottoman fight against the Allied Powers also contributed. Additionally, the British believed that a British-backed state would help defend the Suez Canal. At that time, the Arab Hashemites did not seem opposed to Jewish rule over Palestine.

=== Early years of the British Mandate ===
After World War I, the League of Nations granted Britain the Mandate for Palestine, which required it to implement the Balfour Declaration. As the numbers and strength of the Yishuv (the Jewish community in Palestine) grew, tensions between the Jewish and Arab communities deepened. Significant bouts of violence happened during the 1920 Jerusalem Riots, as well as in 1921 and 1929. In addition to the emerging Palestinian Arab nationalism, the violence also drew on religious inspirations, such as the accusation that the Jews intended to take over the Temple Mount.

Despite Arab opposition to Jewish immigration, leading Palestinian families continued to sell land to Zionists throughout the period. At least one quarter of members of the Palestinian Arab Executive benefited financially from such purchases, including the mayor of Jerusalem and the al-Husayni family.

The Zionist leaders intermittently attempted to reach a compromise with the Arabs, but none proved possible.

=== 1936–1939 Arab revolt in Palestine ===
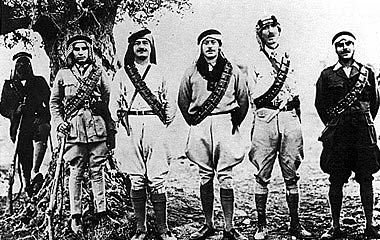
Fawzi al-Qawuqji (third from the right) in 1936

The peasant-led 1936–1939 Arab revolt in Palestine broke out in the context of increased Jewish migration to Palestine and the plight of the rural native fallāḥīn. It sparked following the murder of three Jewish drivers on April 15, 1936, whose funeral led rapidly spreading disturbances. The revolt began with a general strike among Palestinian Arabs on April 19, 1936, which escalated into intercommunal violence. The brutal suppression of the revolt by the British significantly weakened the Palestinian Arabs in advance of the 1948 war.

=== Jewish insurgency in Mandatory Palestine ===
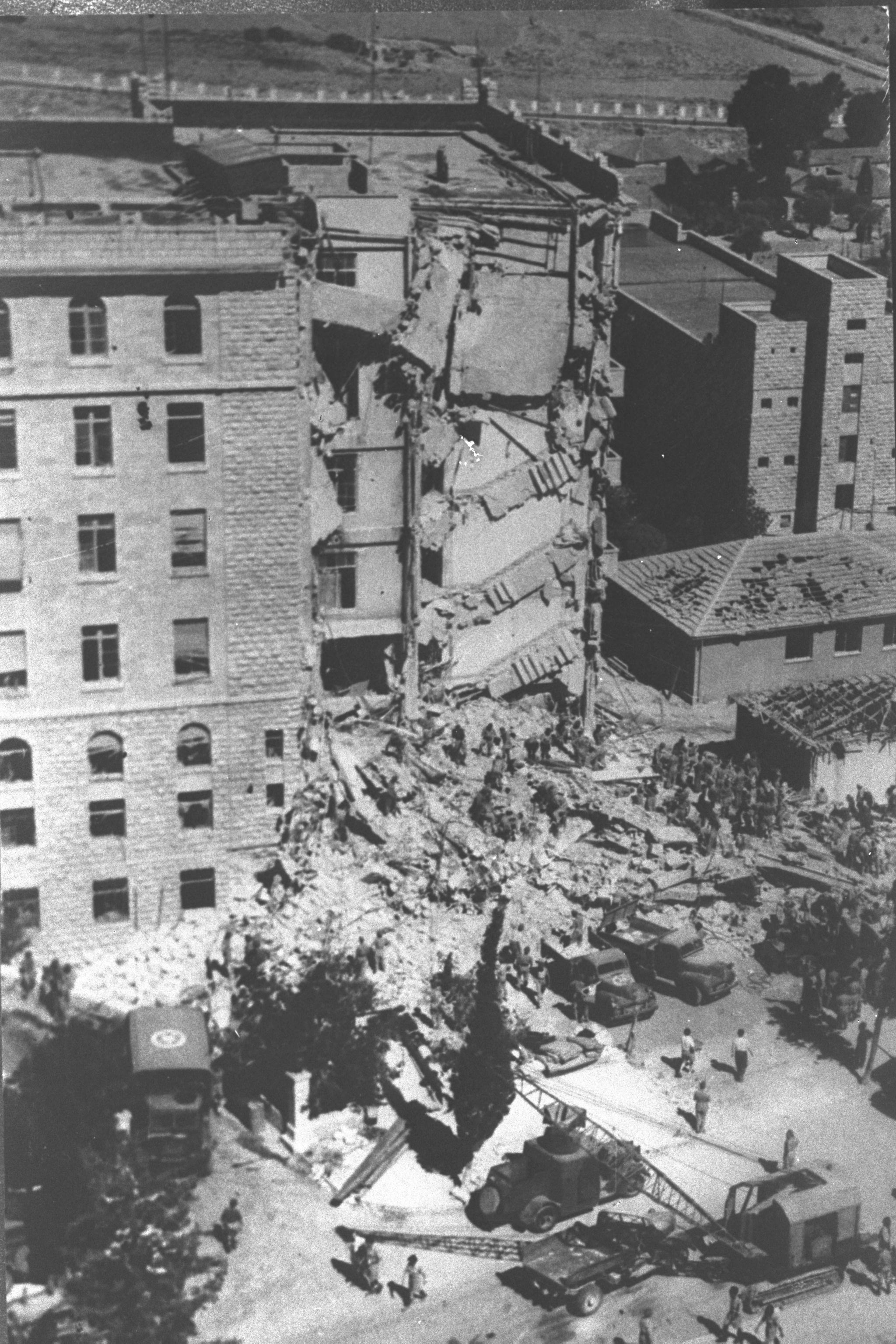
Aftermath of the King David Hotel bombing committed by the Irgun in 1946

Particularly after the White Paper of 1939, the Zionist paramilitary organizations Irgun, Lehi, and Haganah carried out a campaign of acts of terror and sabotage against British rule. Among these attacks was the 1946 King David Hotel bombing carried out by the Irgun which killed 91 people. (Note: Morris 2004, "the upsurge during 1944–1947 of anti-British Jewish terrorism by the Revisionist Irgun Zvai Leumi (IZL) (the National Military Organisation or 'Irgun') and Lohamei Herut Yisrael (LHI) (Freedom Fighters of Israel or 'Stern Gang')") (Note: Pappé 2006 "the Jewish terrorist attack on the King David Hotel")

=== The Arab states ===
Following World War II, the surrounding Arab states were emerging from mandatory rule. Transjordan, under the Hashemite ruler Abdullah I, gained independence from Britain in 1946 and was called Jordan in 1949, but remained under heavy British influence. Egypt gained nominal independence in 1922, but Britain continued to exert a strong influence on it until the Anglo-Egyptian Treaty of 1936 limited Britain's presence to a garrison of troops on the Suez Canal until 1945. Lebanon became an independent state in 1943, but French troops did not withdraw until 1946, the same year Syria won its independence from France.

In 1945, at British prompting, Egypt, Iraq, Lebanon, Saudi Arabia, Syria, Transjordan, and Yemen formed the Arab League to coordinate policy among the Arab states. Iraq and Transjordan coordinated closely, signing a mutual defence treaty, while Egypt, Syria, and Saudi Arabia feared that Transjordan would annex part or all of Palestine and use it as a stepping stone to attack or undermine Syria, Lebanon, and the Hijaz.

=== The 1947 UN Partition Plan ===
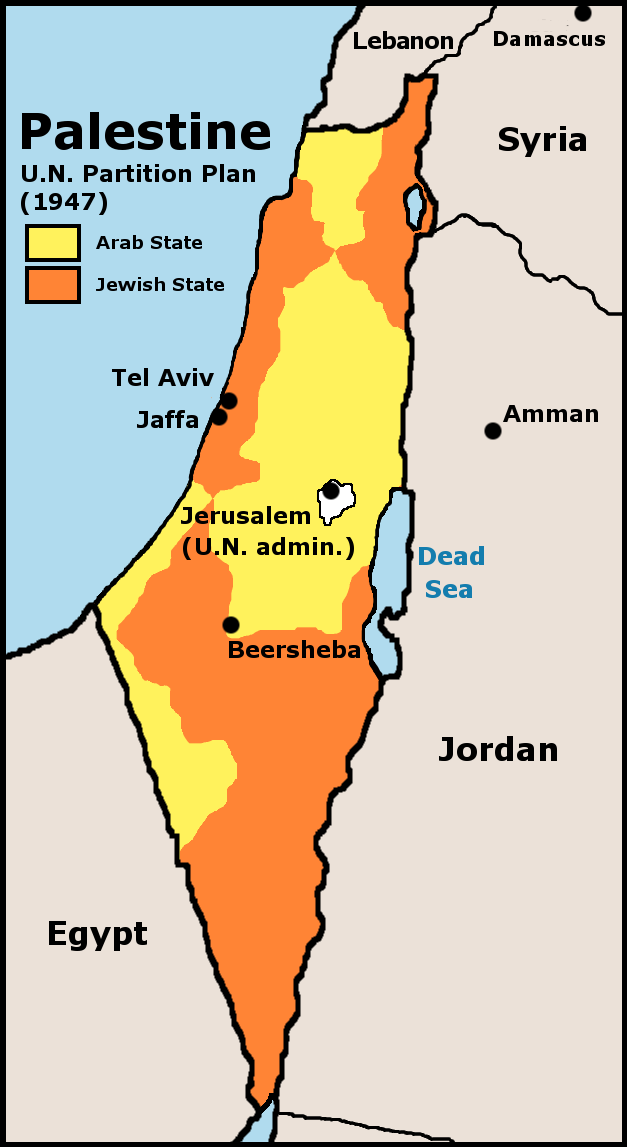
The 1947 UN Partition Plan recommended dividing Palestine into a Jewish state and an Arab state.

On 29 November 1947, the United Nations General Assembly adopted a resolution "recommending to the United Kingdom, as the mandatory Power for Palestine, and to all other Members of the United Nations the adoption and implementation, with regard to the future government of Palestine, of the Plan of Partition with Economic Union", UN General Assembly Resolution 181(II). This was an attempt to resolve the Arab-Jewish conflict by partitioning Palestine into "Independent Arab and Jewish States and the Special International Regime for the City of Jerusalem". Each state would comprise three major sections; the Arab state would also have an enclave in Jaffa, which had an Arab-majority population and provided the Arab state with a port on the Mediterranean.

With about 32% of the population, the Jews were allocated 56% of the territory (most of it the Negev desert). It contained 499,000 Jews and 438,000 Arabs. The Palestinian Arabs were allocated 42% of the land, which had a population of 818,000 Palestinian Arabs and 10,000 Jews. In consideration of its religious significance, the Jerusalem area, including Bethlehem, with 100,000 Jews and an equal number of Palestinian Arabs, was to become a corpus separatum, to be administered by the UN. The residents in the UN-administered territory were given the right to choose to be citizens of either of the new states.

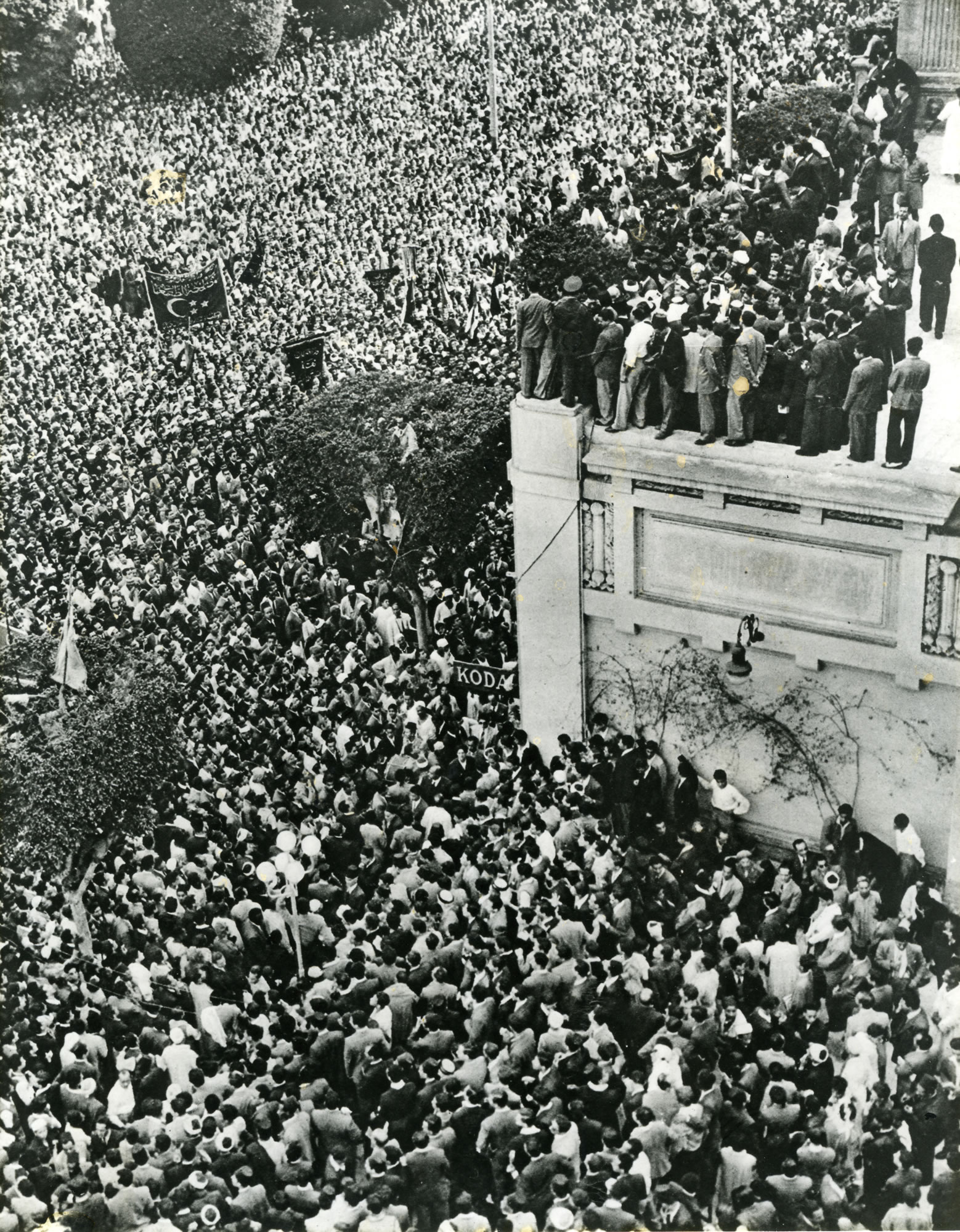
Protests in Cairo, Egypt against the UN Partition Plan, December 1947

The Jewish leadership accepted the partition plan as "the indispensable minimum", glad to gain international recognition but sorry that they did not receive more. The representatives of the Palestinian Arabs and the Arab League firmly opposed the UN action and rejected its authority in the matter, arguing that the partition plan was unfair to the Arabs because of the population balance at that time. According to the Israeli historian Benny Morris, the Arabs rejected the partition, not because it was supposedly unfair, but because their leaders rejected any form of partition. They held "that the rule of Palestine should revert to its inhabitants, in accordance with the provisions of ... the Charter of the United Nations". According to Article 73b of the Charter, the UN should develop self-government of the peoples in a territory under its administration. In the immediate aftermath of the UN's approval of the partition plan, explosions of joy in the Jewish community were counterbalanced by discontent in the Arab community. Soon after, violence broke out and became more prevalent. Murders, reprisals, and counter-reprisals came fast upon each other, resulting in dozens killed on both sides. The sanguinary impasse persisted as no force intervened to put a stop to the escalating violence.

== First phase: 1947–1948 civil war in Mandatory Palestine ==
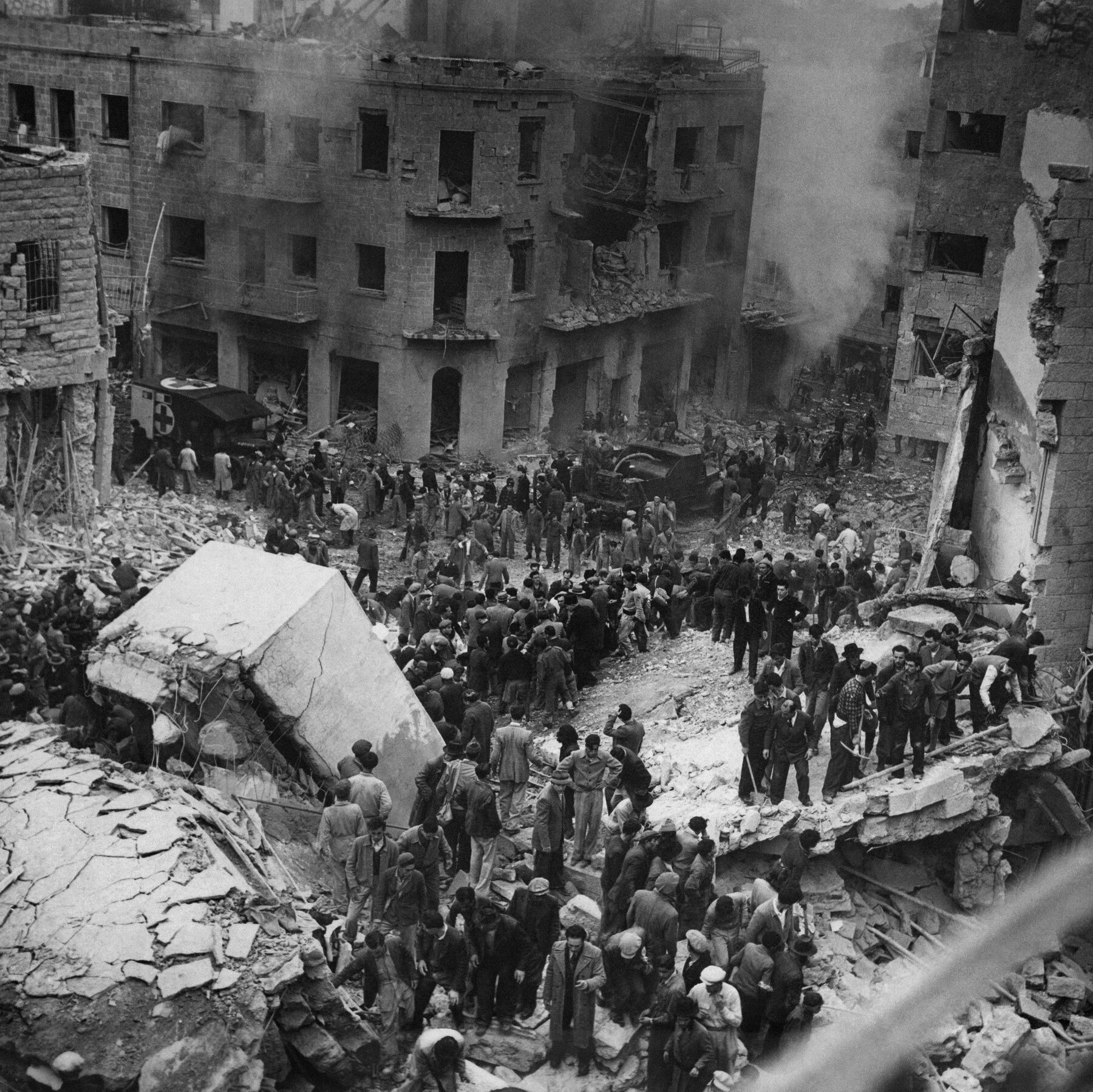
Aftermath of the Ben Yehuda Street bombing, March 1948

The first phase of the war took place from the United Nations General Assembly vote for the Partition Plan for Palestine on 29 November 1947 until the termination of the British Mandate and Israeli proclamation of statehood on 14 May 1948. During this period the Jewish and Arab communities of the British Mandate clashed, while the British organised their withdrawal and intervened only occasionally. In the first two months of the Civil War, around 1,000 people were killed and 2,000 injured, and by the end of March, the figure had risen to 2,000 dead and 4,000 wounded. These figures correspond to an average of more than 100 deaths and 200 casualties per week in a population of 2,000,000.

From January onwards, operations became increasingly militarised. A number of Arab Liberation Army regiments infiltrated Palestine, each active in a variety of distinct sectors around the coastal towns. They consolidated their presence in Galilee and Samaria. The Army of the Holy War, under Abd al-Qadir al-Husayni's command, came from Egypt with several hundred men. Having recruited a few thousand volunteers, al-Husayni organised the blockade of the 100,000 Jewish residents of Jerusalem.

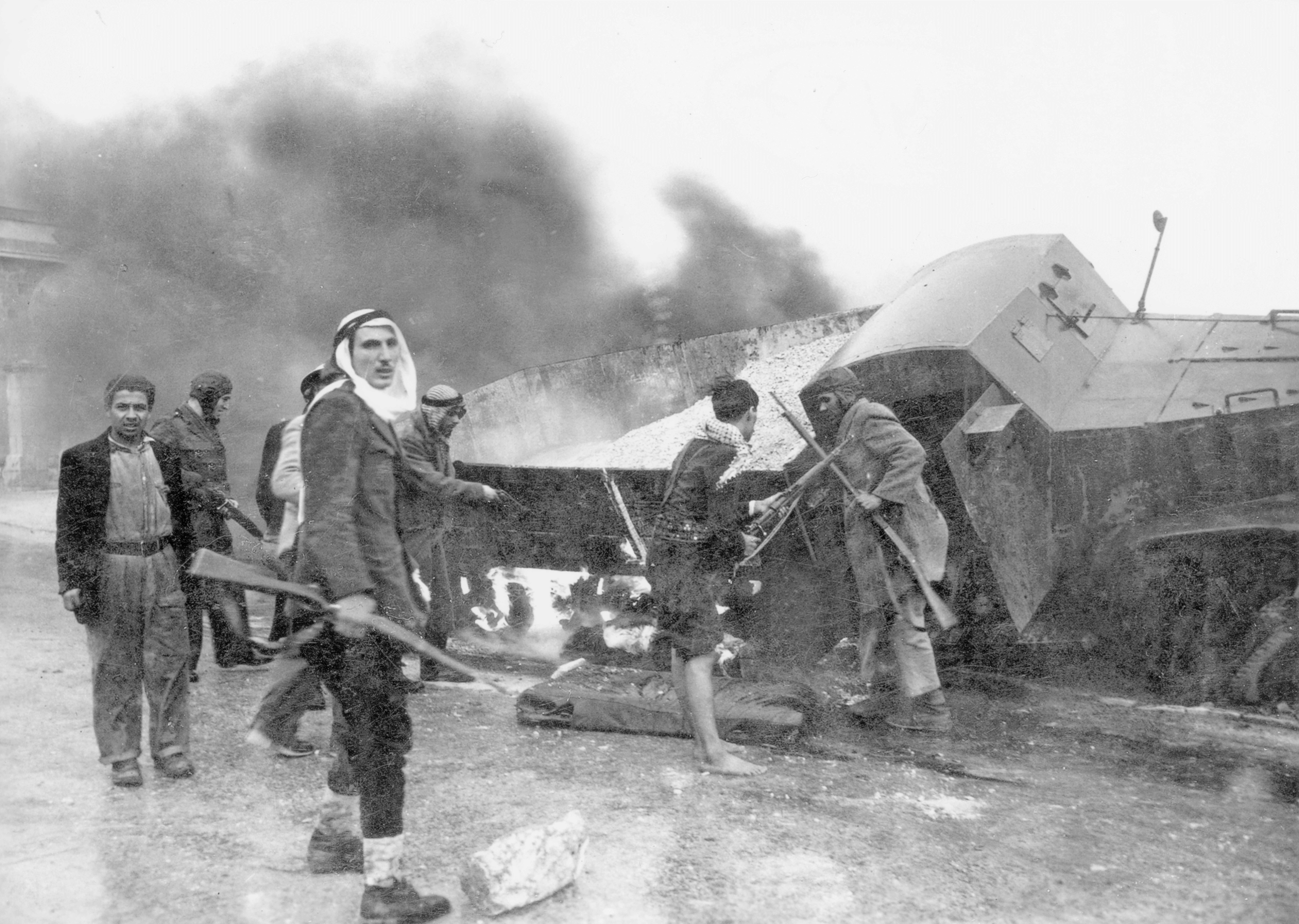
Arab fighters in front of a burning Haganah armoured supply truck near the city of Jerusalem, March 1948.

To counter this, the Yishuv authorities tried to supply the city with convoys of up to 100 armoured vehicles, but the operation became more and more impractical as the number of casualties in the relief convoys surged. By March, al-Husayni's tactic had paid off. Almost all of Haganah's armoured vehicles had been destroyed, the blockade was in full operation, and hundreds of Haganah members who had tried to bring supplies into the city were killed. The situation for those in the Jewish settlements in the highly isolated Negev and North of Galilee was more critical.

This caused the US to withdraw its support for the Partition Plan, and the Arab League began to believe that the Palestinian Arabs, reinforced by the Arab Liberation Army, could end the partition. The British decided on 7 February 1948 to support Transjordan's annexation of the Arab part of Palestine.

While the Jewish population was ordered to hold their ground everywhere at all costs, the Arab population was disrupted by general conditions of insecurity. Up to 100,000 Arabs from the urban upper and middle classes in Haifa, Jaffa and Jerusalem, or Jewish-dominated areas, evacuated abroad or to Arab centres to the east.

=== Plan Dalet and second stage ===
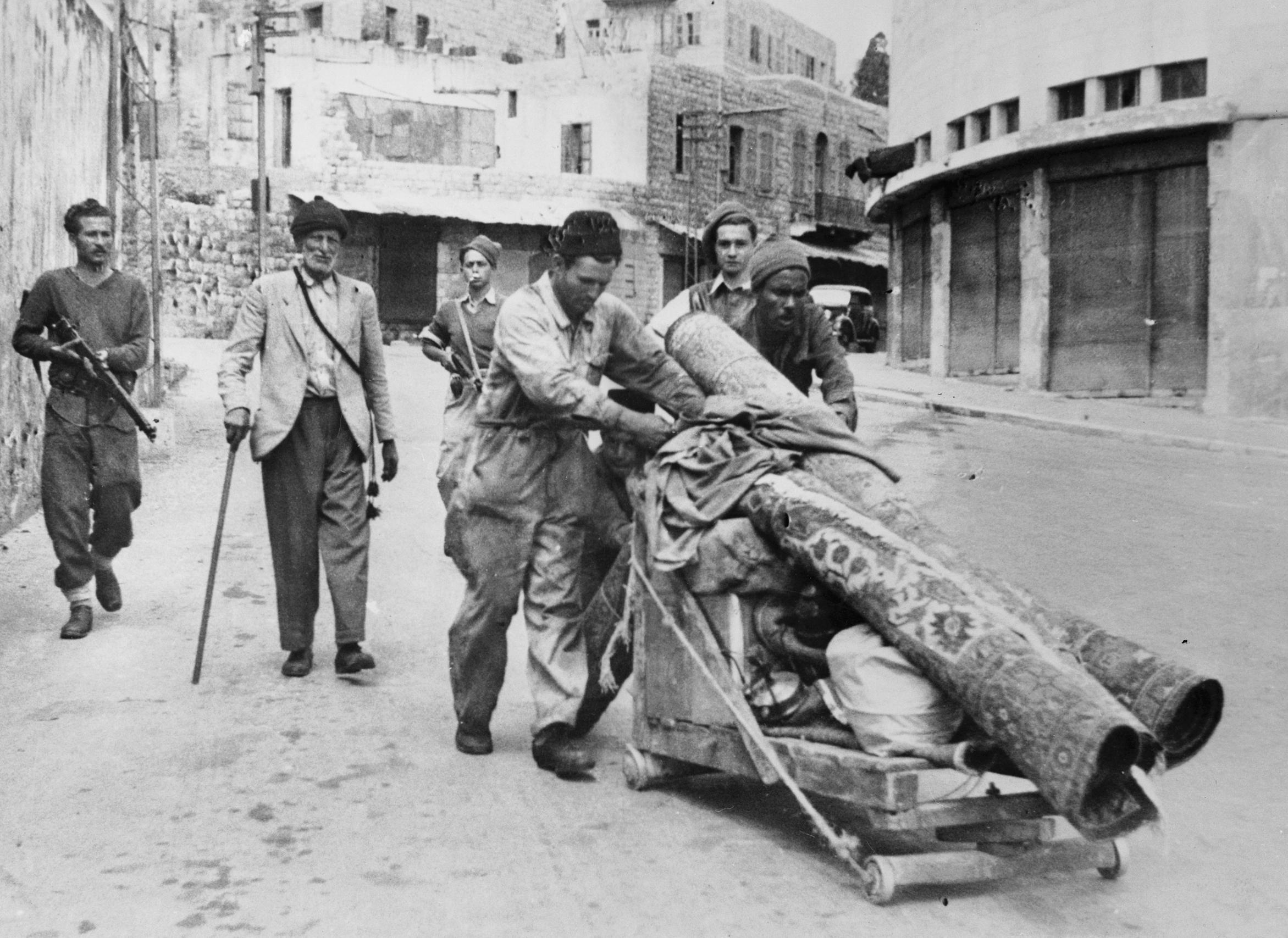
Arab residents being expelled during the Battle of Haifa

David Ben-Gurion ordered Yigal Yadin to plan for the announced intervention of the Arab states. The result of his analysis was Plan Dalet, which was put in place at the start of April, and which marked the war's second phase, in which the Haganah took the offensive.

The first operation, Nachshon, was directed at lifting the blockade on Jerusalem. In the last week of March, 136 supply trucks had tried to reach Jerusalem; only 41 had made it. The Arab attacks on communications and roads had intensified. The convoys' failure and the loss of Jewish armoured vehicles had shaken the Yishuv leaders' confidence. The city's food and water supply was cut off. Jerusalem was on the verge of starvation in May, both food and water rationing had been introduced.

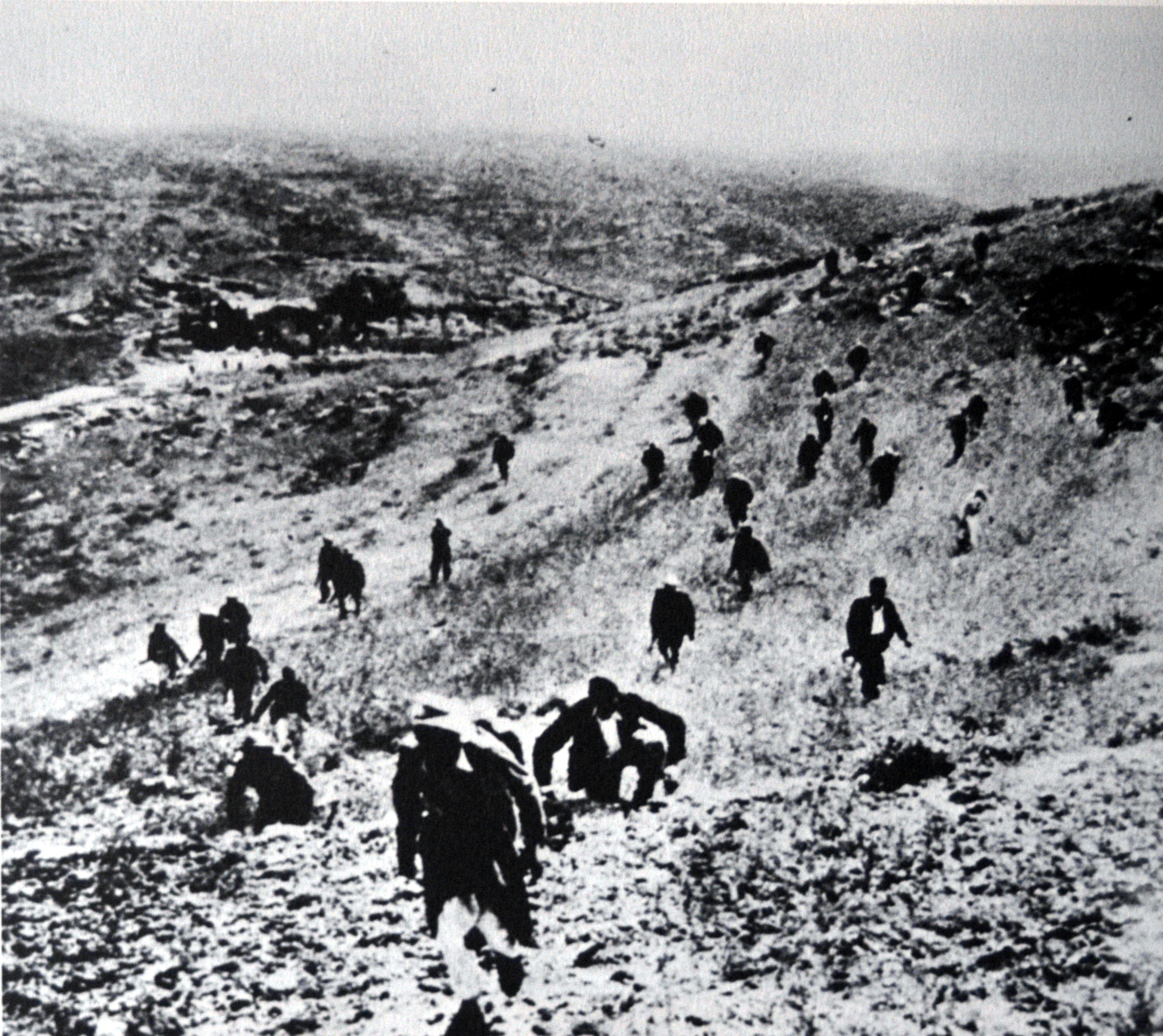
Palestinian irregulars of the Holy War Army, approaching al-Qastal village near Jerusalem to take it back from Palmach

During this time, paramilitary groups Irgun and Lehi, supported by the Haganah and Palmach, (Note: Benny Morris, Righteous Victims - "The most important event during Operation Nahshon was probably the conquest by the IZL and LHI, assisted by the Haganah, of the village of Deir Yassin") (Note: Benny Morris "The Historiography of Deir Yassin" (2005), The Journal of Israeli History. "In the course of the battle, the dissidents ran low on ammunition and asked for and obtained thousands of rounds from the Haganah; Haganah squads also provided covering fire and fired on the refugees fleeing southward, towards "Ein Karim. Two squads of the Palmah (the elite strike force of the Haganah) also arrived on the scene and helped evacuate the wounded and take some of the houses.") perpetrated the Deir Yassin massacre, killing at least 107 Arab villagers, including women and children, and expelled the rest of the village's residents (approximately 750 people). The event was widely publicized and had a deep effect on the Arab population's morale, greatly contributing to the Palestinian expulsion and flight.

The Hadassah medical convoy massacre was conducted by Arab forces as retaliation for Deir Yassin. 79 Jews were killed in the attack which led to a further deterioration of Jewish-Arab relations.

From April 4–15, the first large-scale operation of the Arab Liberation Army ended in a debacle, as they were roundly defeated at Mishmar HaEmek. Their Druze allies left them through defection.

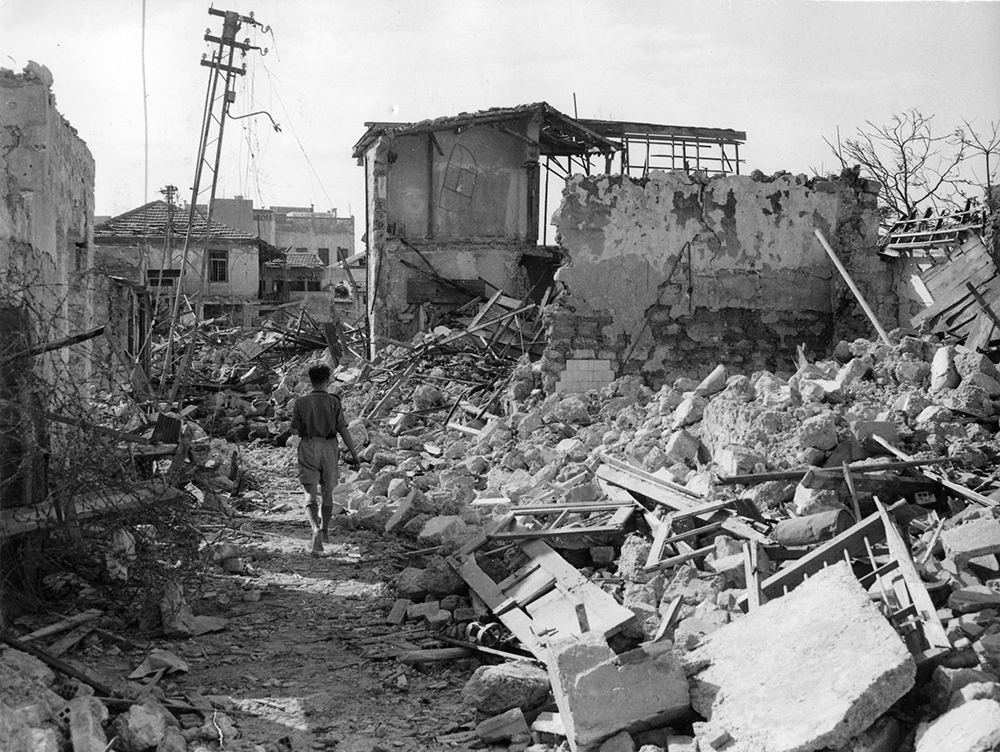
Destroyed buildings in the Manshiya quarter of Jaffa, May 1948

As part of Plan Dalet, the Haganah, Palmach and Irgun captured the urban centers of Tiberias, Haifa (See: Battle of Haifa), Safed, Beisan, Jaffa, and Acre, violently expelling more than 250,000 Palestinian Arabs.

The British had essentially withdrawn their troops. The situation pushed the neighbouring Arab states to intervene, but their preparation was not completed, and they could not assemble sufficient forces to turn the tide of the war. The majority of Palestinian Arab hopes lay with the Arab Legion of Transjordan's monarch, King Abdullah I. However Abdullah did not intend to create a Palestinian state, but hoped to annex much of Eastern Palestine. Playing both sides, he was in contact with both the Israelis and the Arab League.

Preparing for Arab intervention from neighbouring states, Haganah successfully launched Operations Yiftah and Ben-'Ami to secure the Jewish settlements of Galilee, and Operation Kilshon. This created an Israeli-controlled front around Jerusalem. The inconclusive meeting between Golda Meir and Abdullah I, followed by the Kfar Etzion massacre on 13 May by the Arab Legion, led to predictions that the battle for Jerusalem would be merciless.

Israeli historians Benny Morris and Benjamin Kedar revealed that during the 1948 war, Israel conducted a biological warfare operation codenamed Cast Thy Bread, using typhoid bacteria to contaminate wells in Arab areas to prevent reentry and deter advancing Arab forces.

== Second phase: 1948 Arab–Israeli War ==
=== Arab League entry ===
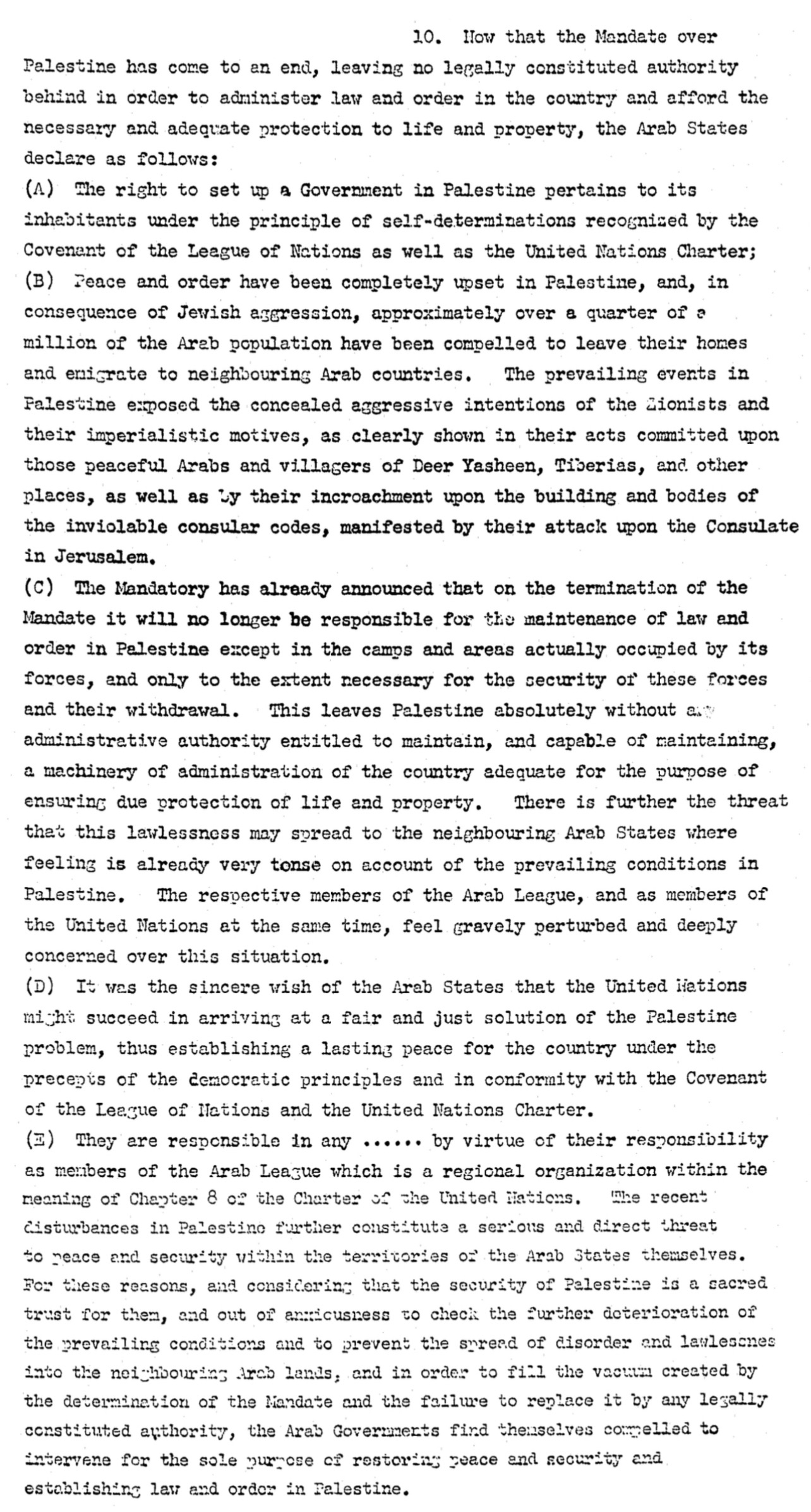
Clause 10 of the 15 May 1948 Arab League cablegram stating the reasons for their entry into the territory

On 14 May 1948, the day before the expiration of the British Mandate, David Ben-Gurion declared the establishment of a Jewish state in Eretz Israel, to be known as the State of Israel. Both superpower leaders, U.S. President Harry S. Truman and Soviet leader Joseph Stalin, immediately recognised the new state, while the Arab League refused to accept the UN Partition Plan, proclaimed the right of self-determination for the Arabs across the whole of Palestine, and maintained that the absence of legal authority made it necessary to intervene to protect Arab lives and property. The Palestinians' Arab Higher Committee rejected the Partition Resolution and any kind of Jewish state and refused to negotiate with "the Zionist Project".

Map of the military situation as of June 1st 1948

Over the next few days, contingents of four of the seven countries of the Arab League at that time, Egypt, Iraq, Transjordan, and Syria, invaded the former British Mandate of Palestine and fought the Israelis. They were supported by the Arab Liberation Army, Muslim Brotherhood contingents, and corps of volunteers from Saudi Arabia, Lebanon and Yemen. The Arab armies launched a simultaneous offensive on all fronts: Egyptian forces invaded from the south, Jordanian and Iraqi forces from the east, and Syrian forces invaded from the north. Cooperation among the various Arab armies was poor.

=== First truce: 11 June – 8 July 1948 ===
The UN declared a truce on 29 May, which began on 11 June and lasted 28 days. The ceasefire was overseen by UN mediator Folke Bernadotte and a team of UN Observers, army officers from Belgium, United States, Sweden and France. Bernadotte was voted in by the General Assembly to "assure the safety of the holy places, to safeguard the well being of the population, and to promote 'a peaceful adjustment of the future situation of Palestine'". He spoke of "peace by Christmas" but saw that the Arab world had continued to reject the existence of a Jewish state, whatever its borders.

Folke Bernadotte in Jerusalem

An arms embargo was declared with the intention that neither side would make gains from the truce. Neither side respected the truce; both found ways around the restrictions. Both the Israelis and the Arabs used this time to improve their positions, a direct violation of the terms of the ceasefire.

"The Arabs violated the truce by reinforcing their lines with fresh units (including six companies of Sudanese regulars, a Saudi battalion and contingents from Yemen and Morocco) and by preventing supplies from reaching isolated Israeli settlements; occasionally, they opened fire along the lines". The Israeli Defense Forces acquired weapons from Czechoslovakia in contravention to the terms of the truce, improving the training of its forces, and reorganising the army. Yitzhak Rabin, an IDF commander who would later become Israel's fifth prime minister, said, "[w]ithout the arms from Czechoslovakia... it is very doubtful whether we would have been able to conduct the war". As well as violating the arms and personnel embargo, both sides sent fresh units to the front. Israel's army increased its manpower from approximately 30,000 or 35,000 men to almost 65,000 during the truce and its arms supply to "more than twenty-five thousand rifles, five thousand machine guns, and more than fifty million bullets".

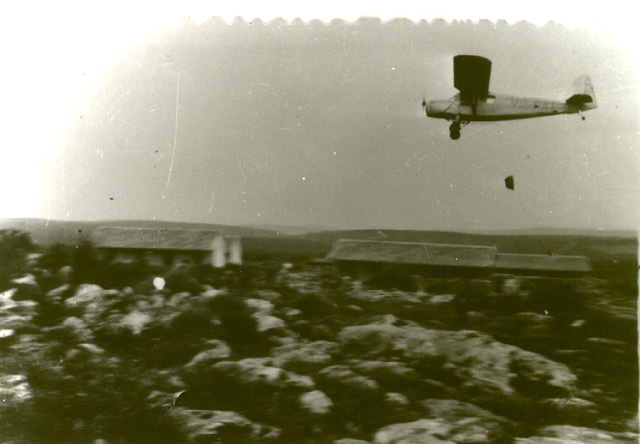
Israeli forces air dropping supplies to besieged Yehiam, 1948

As the truce began, a British officer stationed in Haifa said the four-week-long truce "would certainly be exploited by the Jews to continue military training and reorganization while the Arabs would waste [them] feuding over the future divisions of the spoils". On 7 July, the day before the truce expired, Egyptian forces under General Muhammad Naguib renewed the war by attacking Negba.

=== Second phase: 8–18 July 1948 ===
Israeli forces launched a simultaneous offensive on all three fronts: Dani, Dekel, and Kedem. The fighting was dominated by large-scale Israeli offensives and a defensive Arab posture and continued for ten days until the UN Security Council issued the Second Truce on 18 July.

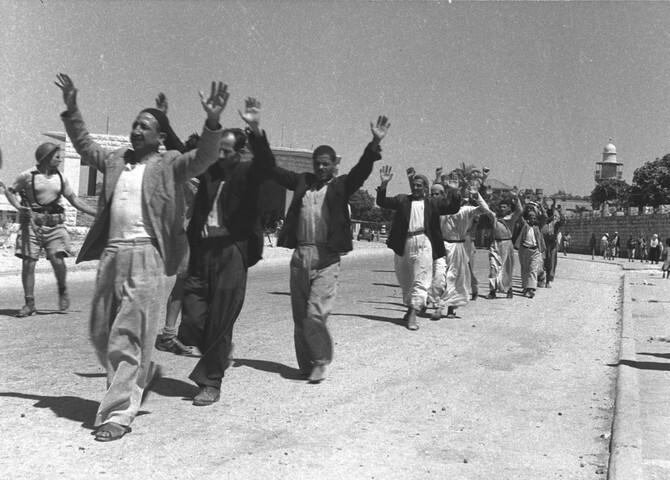
Detained Palestinians during the expulsion from Ramle, July 1948

Israeli Operation Dani resulted in the expulsion from Lydda and Ramle of 60,000 Palestinian residents. According to Benny Morris, in Ben-Gurion's view, Ramlah and Lydda constituted a special danger because their proximity might encourage cooperation between the Egyptian army, which had started its attack on Kibbutz Negbah, and the Arab Legion, which had taken the Lydda police station. Widespread looting took place during these operations, and about 100,000 Palestinians became refugees. In Operation Dekel, Nazareth was captured on 16 July. In Operation Brosh, Israel tried and failed to drive the Syrian army out of northeastern Galilee. By the time the second truce took effect at 19:00 18 July, Israel had taken the lower Galilee from Haifa Bay to the Sea of Galilee.

With smuggled Boeing B-17 Flying Fortress planes acquired in violation of the international arms embargo, Israel bombed a residential neighborhood in Cairo on July 15.

=== 18 July 1948 – 10 March 1949 ===
At 19:00 on 18 July, the second truce of the conflict went into effect after intense diplomatic efforts by the UN. On 16 September, a new partition plan for Palestine was proposed but it was rejected by both sides.

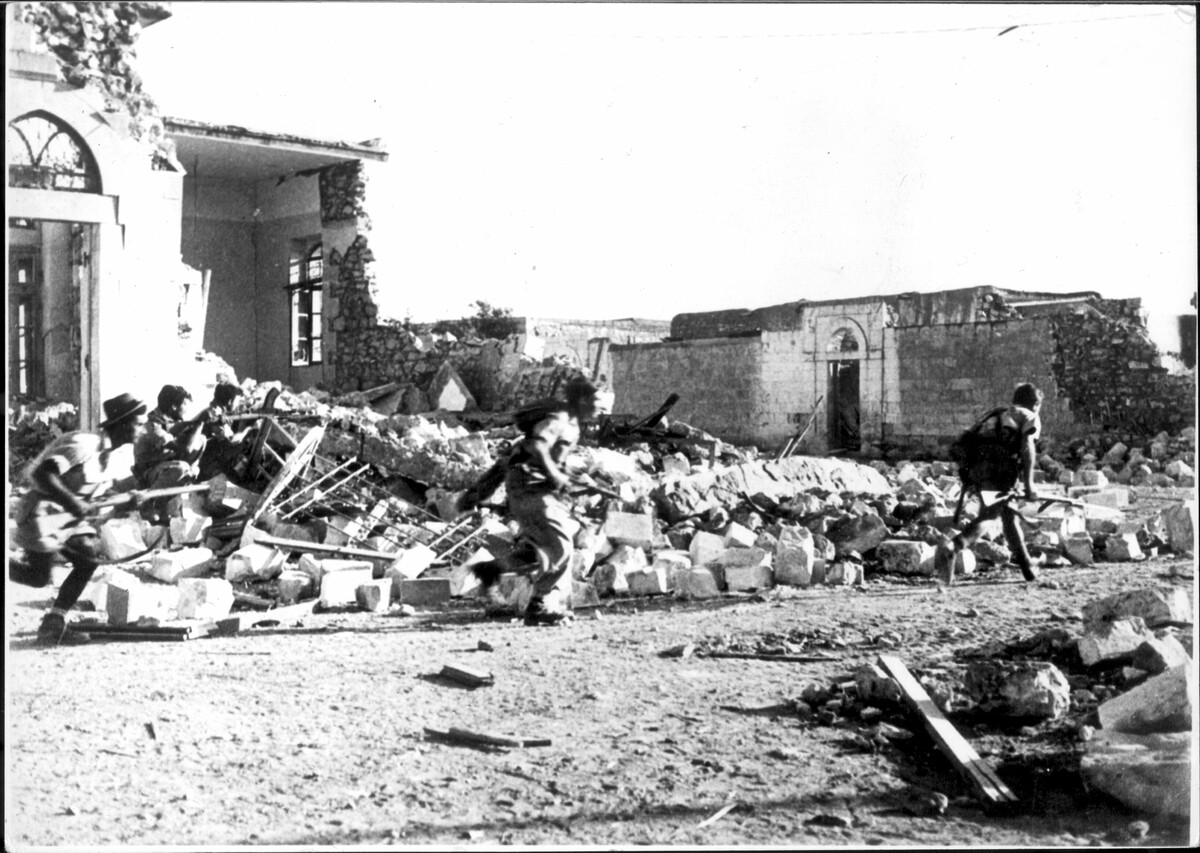
Palmach Infantry go into action during the fight for Beersheba, 21 October

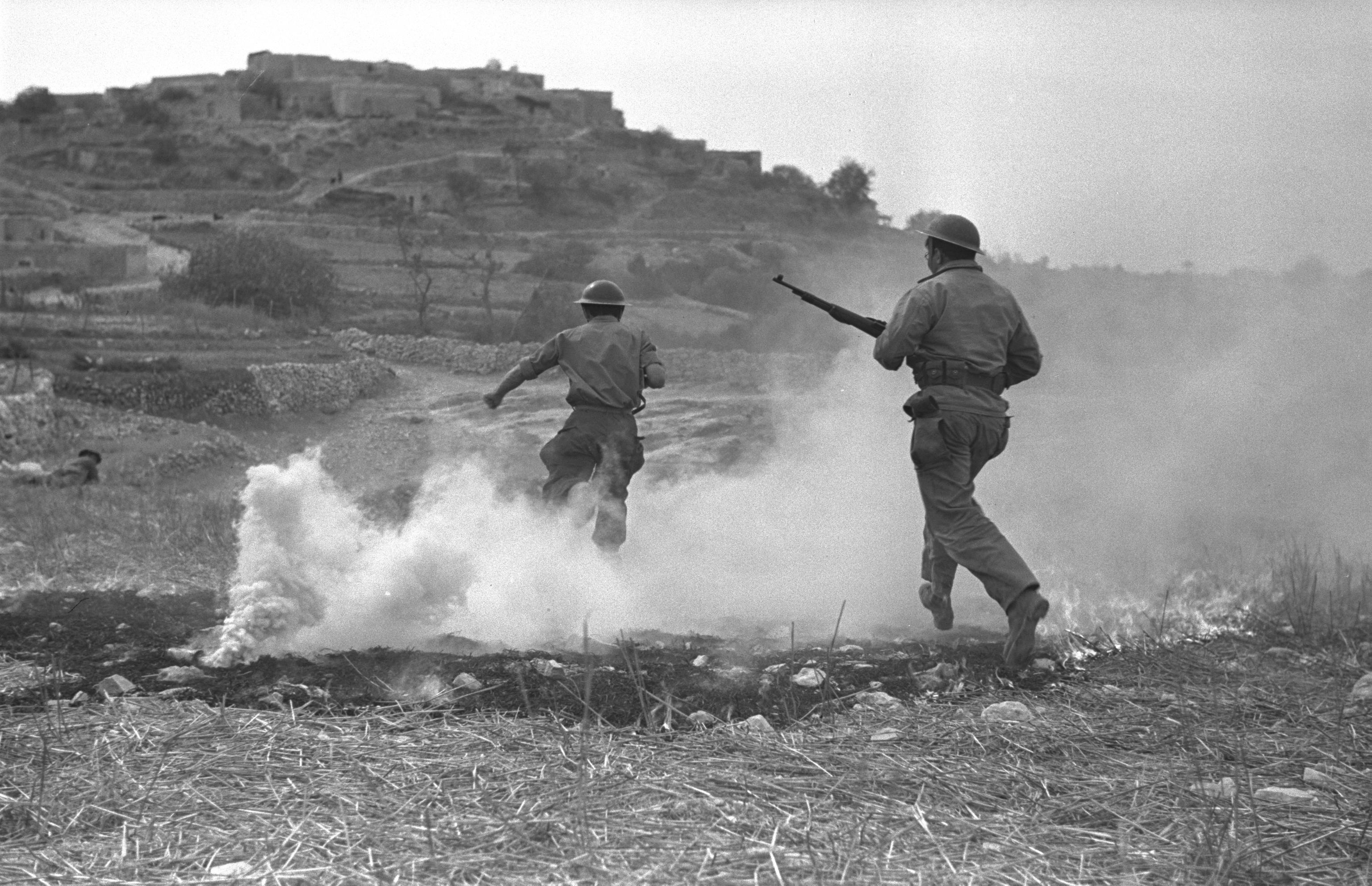
Israeli soldiers attack Sasa during Operation Hiram, October

IDF forces near Beit Natif (near Hebron) after it was occupied, October

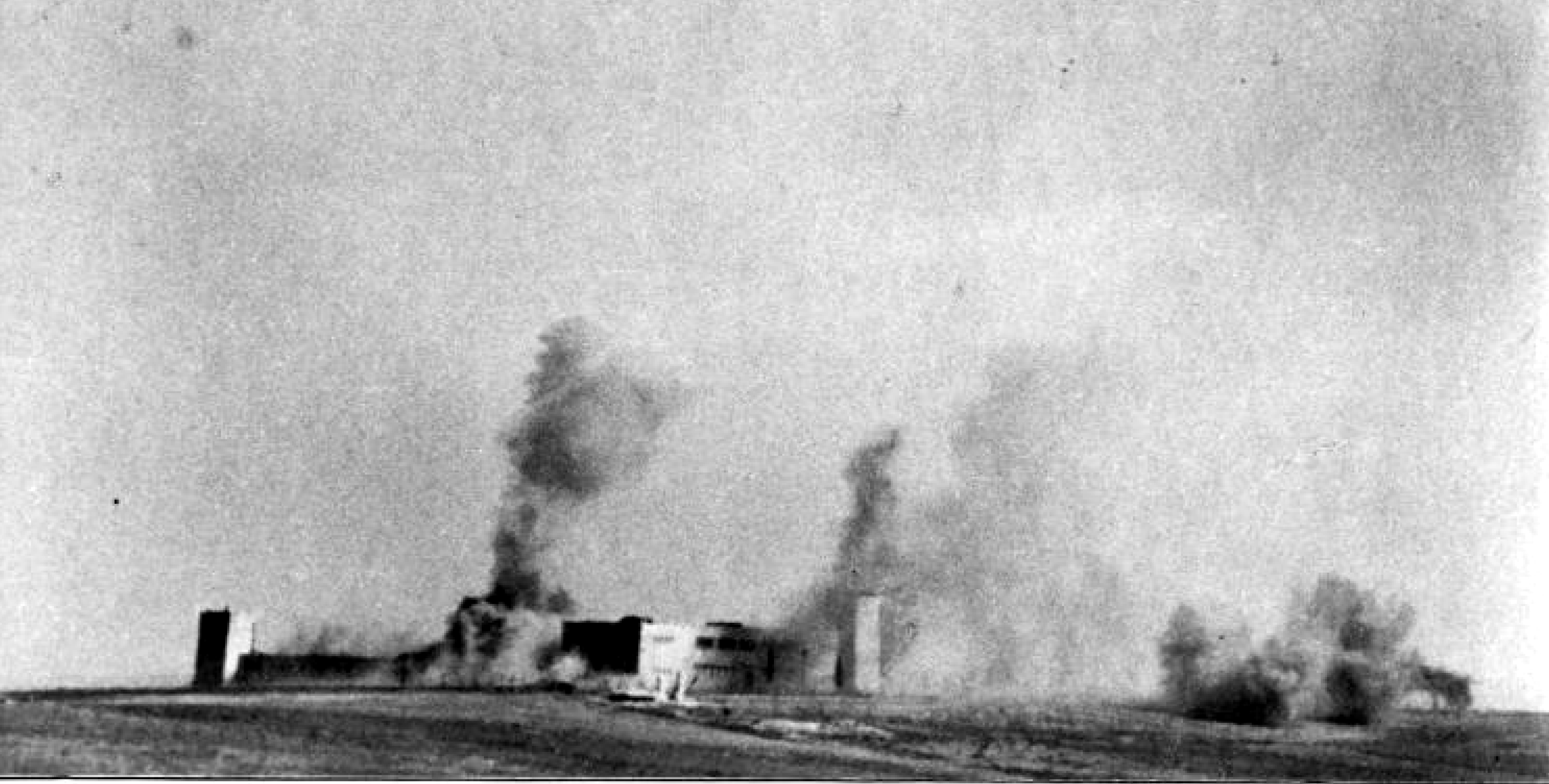
Israeli bombardment of the Iraq Suwaydan fort, held by the Egyptian army, on 9 November

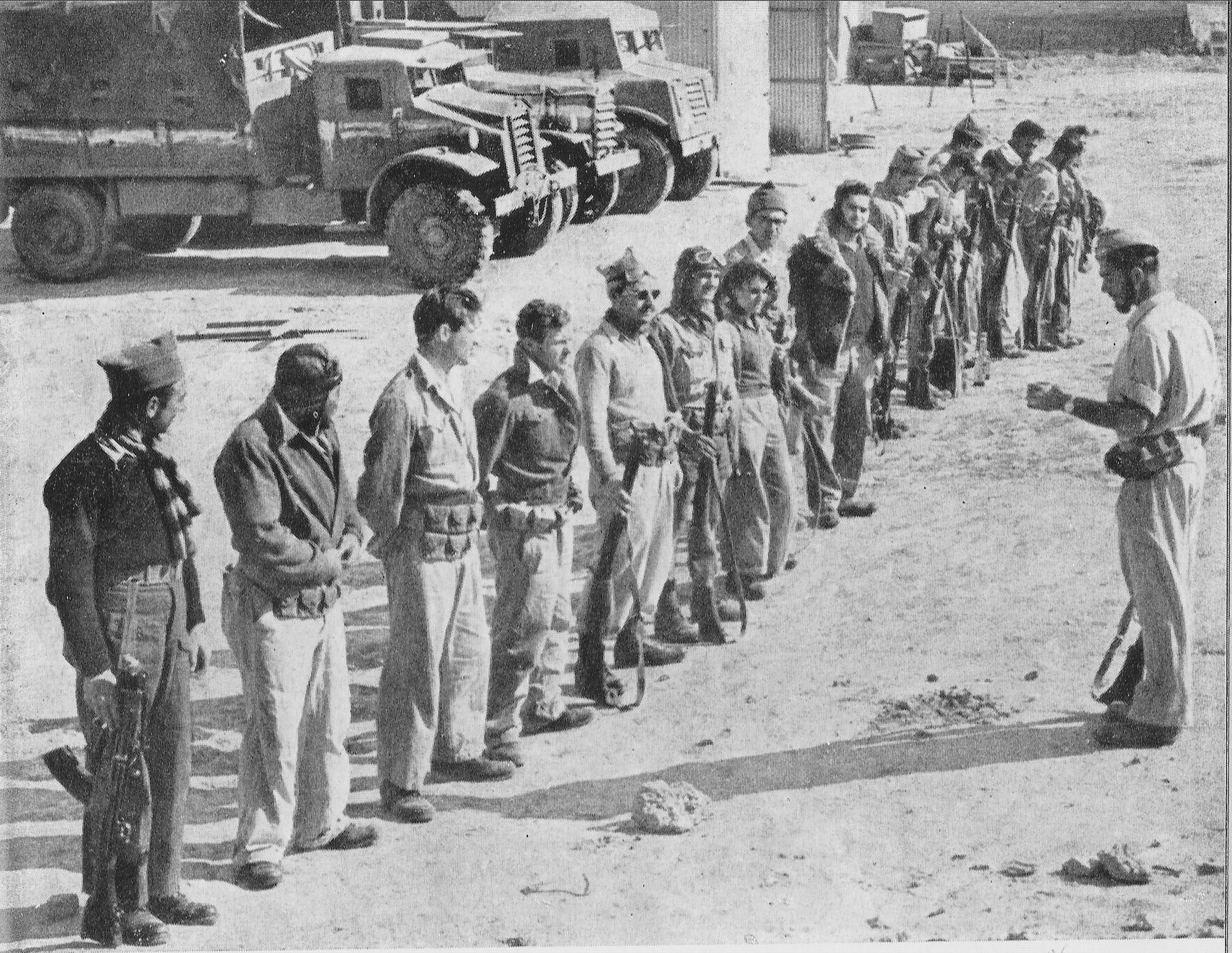
Palmach soldiers are instructed before Operation Yoav

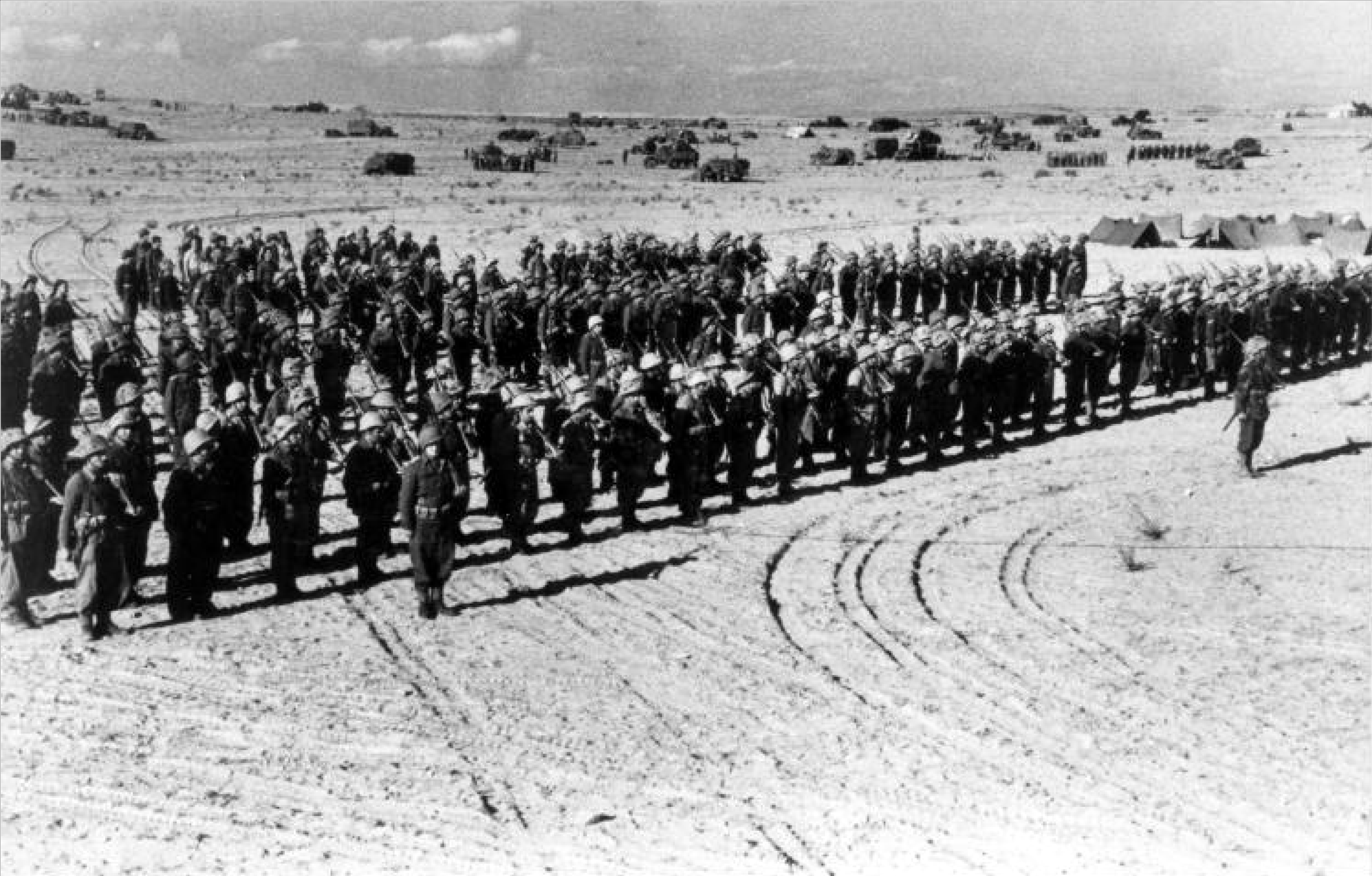
Negev Brigade prior to Operation Horev

The formation of the Israel Defense Forces on 26 May 1948 in Jerusalem.

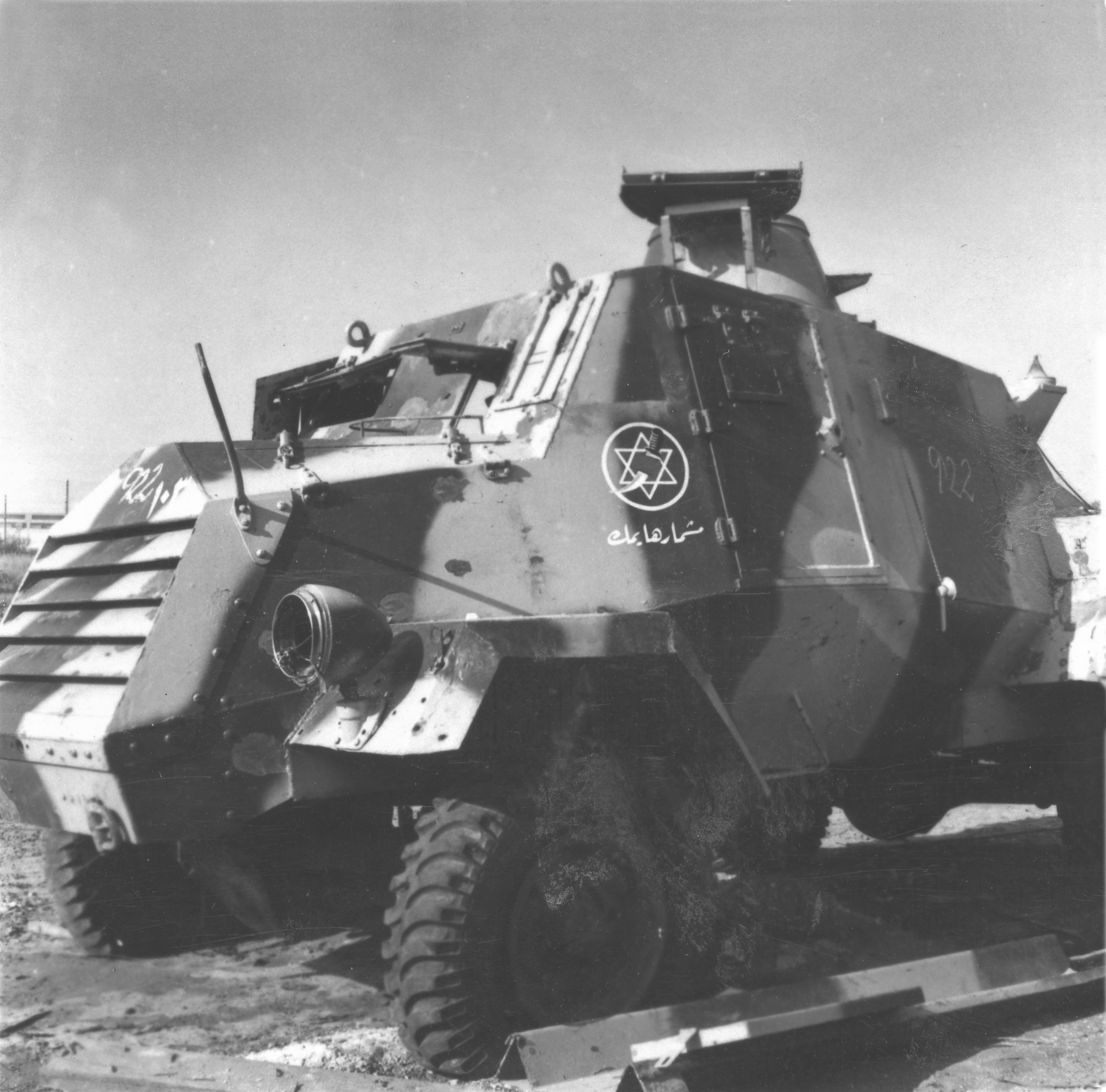
An Otter armoured car captured by the Haganah from the ALA in 1948

During the truce, the Egyptians regularly blocked the passage of supply convoys to the beleaguered northern Negev settlements by firing on them, contrary to the truce terms. On 15 October, they attacked another supply convoy, and the already planned Operation Yoav was launched. Its goal was to drive a wedge between the Egyptian forces along the coast and the Beersheba-Hebron-Jerusalem road, and to open the road to the encircled Negev settlements. Yoav was headed by Southern Front commander Yigal Allon. The operation was a success, shattering the Egyptian army ranks and forcing Egyptian forces to retreat from the northern Negev, Beersheba, and Ashdod. Meanwhile, on 19 October, Operation Ha-Har commenced operations in the Jerusalem Corridor.

On 22 October, the third truce went into effect.

Before dawn on 22 October, in defiance of the UN Security Council ceasefire order, ALA units stormed the IDF hilltop position of Sheikh Abd, overlooking Kibbutz Manara. The kibbutz was now besieged. Ben-Gurion initially rejected Moshe Carmel's demand to launch a major counteroffensive. He was wary of antagonising the United Nations on the heels of its ceasefire order. During 24–25 October, ALA troops regularly sniped at Manara and traffic along the main road. In contacts with UN observers, Fawzi al-Qawuqji demanded that Israel evacuate neighbouring Kibbutz Yiftah and thin out its forces in Manara. The IDF demanded the ALA's withdrawal from the captured positions and, after a "no" from al-Qawuqji, informed the UN that it felt free to do as it pleased. On 24 October, the IDF launched Operation Hiram and captured the entire upper Galilee, originally attributed to the Arab state by the Partition Plan. It drove the ALA back to Lebanon. At the end of the month, Israel had captured the whole Galilee and had advanced 5 miles (8.0 km) into Lebanon to the Litani River.

On 22 December, large IDF forces started Operation Horev. Its objective was to encircle the Egyptian Army in the Gaza Strip and force the Egyptians to end the war. The operation was a decisive Israeli victory, and Israeli raids into the Nitzana area and the Sinai Peninsula forced the Egyptian army into the Gaza Strip, where it was surrounded. Israeli forces withdrew from Sinai and Gaza under international pressure and after the British threatened to intervene against Israel. The Egyptian government announced on 6 January 1949 that it was willing to enter armistice negotiations. Allon persuaded Ben-Gurion to continue as planned, but Ben-Gurion told him: "Do you know the value of peace talks with Egypt? After all, that is our great dream!" He was sure that Transjordan and the other Arab states would follow suit. On 7 January 1949, a truce was achieved.

On 5 March, Israel launched Operation Uvda; by 10 March, the Israelis reached Umm Rashrash (where Eilat was built later) and took it without a battle. The Negev Brigade and Golani Brigade took part in the operation. They raised a hand-made flag ("The Ink Flag") and claimed Umm Rashrash for Israel.

== Aftermath ==
=== Armistice lines ===
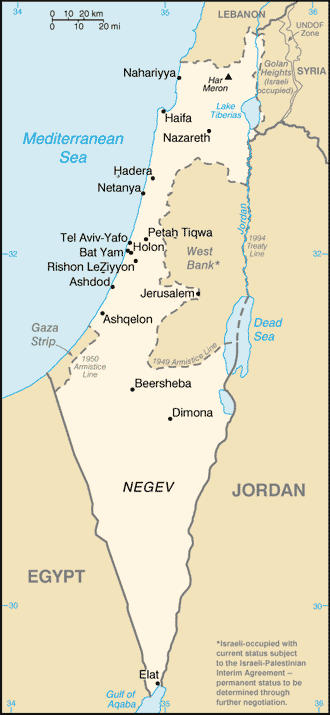
Israel after the 1949 Armistice Agreements

In 1949, Israel signed separate armistices with Egypt on 24 February, Lebanon on 23 March, Transjordan on 3 April, and Syria on 20 July. The armistice lines saw Israel holding about 78% of Mandatory Palestine (as it stood after the independence of Transjordan in 1946), 22% more than the UN Partition Plan had allocated. These ceasefire lines were known afterwards as the "Green Line". The Gaza Strip and the West Bank were occupied by Egypt and Transjordan, respectively. The United Nations Truce Supervision Organization and Mixed Armistice Commissions were set up to monitor ceasefires, supervise the armistice agreements, to prevent isolated incidents from escalating, and assist other UN peacekeeping operations in the region.

=== Casualties ===
Israel lost 6,373 people, about 1% of its population, in the war. About 4,000 were soldiers and the rest were civilians. The exact number of Arab losses is unknown but is estimated at between 4,000 for Egypt (2,000), Jordan and Syria (1,000 each) and 15,000.

According to Benny Morris,

Given that the first half of the war involved hostilities between militias based in a large number of interspersed civilian communities, the conquest of some two hundred villages and urban centers, and the later conquest of two hundred additional villages, 1948 is actually noteworthy for the relatively small number of civilian casualties both in the battles themselves and in the atrocities that accompanied them or followed (compare this, for example, to the casualty rates and atrocities in the Yugoslav wars of the 1990s or the Sudanese civil wars of the past fifty years).

=== Demographic consequences ===
During the 1947–48 Civil War in Mandatory Palestine and the 1948 Arab–Israeli War that followed, around 700,000 Palestinian Arabs fled or were expelled. In 1951, the UN Conciliation Commission for Palestine estimated that the number of Palestinian refugees displaced from Israel was 711,000. This number did not include displaced Palestinians inside Israeli-held territory. The list of villages depopulated during the Arab–Israeli conflict includes more than 400 Arab villages. It also includes about ten Jewish villages and neighbourhoods, resulting in no Jews left in or being able to return to the Arab-controlled territory.

The causes of the 1948 Palestinian exodus are a controversial topic among historians. The Palestinian refugee problem and the debate around the right of their return are also major issues of the Israeli–Palestinian conflict. Palestinians have staged annual demonstrations and protests on 15 May of each year.

During the 1948 Arab–Israeli War, around 10,000 Jews were forced to evacuate their homes in Palestine or Israel. The war indirectly resulted in the Jewish exodus from Arab and Muslim lands. Largely because of the war between Jews and Arabs in Palestine, hundreds of thousands of Jews who lived in the Arab states were intimidated into flight, or were expelled from their native countries, most of them reaching Israel. The immediate reasons for this exodus were both the popular Arab hostility, including pogroms and anti-Jewish governmental measures, as well as the desire of many Jewish people to join the newly established State of Israel.

According to Benny Morris, "the experience of discrimination and persecution in the Arab world ... that preceded 1948 ... [left] a deep dislike, indeed hatred, of that world among [the first generation of Jews that fled or were expelled] and their descendants." This affects Israeli politics with negative views of Arabs and "hard-line, right-wing voting patterns." He states these are long lasting indirect consequences of the war.

In the three years following the war, about 700,000 Jews immigrated to Israel, where they were absorbed, fed and housed mainly along the borders and in former Palestinian lands. Beginning in 1948, and continuing until 1972, an estimated 800,000 to 1,000,000 Jews migrated to Israel. From 1945 until the closure of 1952, more than 250,000 Jewish displaced persons lived in European refugee camps. About 136,000 of them immigrated to Israel. More than 270,000 Jews immigrated from Eastern Europe, mainly Romania and Poland (over 100,000 each). Overall 700,000 Jews settled in Israel, doubling its Jewish population.

== Historiography ==
Since the war, different historiographical traditions have interpreted the events of 1948 differently; in the words of the New Historian Avi Shlaim, "each side subscribes to a different version of events." In the Israeli narrative, the war is Israel's War of Independence. In the Palestinian narrative, the War of 1948 is inextricable from the Nakba, the Zionist movement is one of settler colonialism, and the Israelis are seen as conquerors and the Palestinians as victims. The different narratives of 1948 reflect these different perceptions.

An issue affecting the historiography of 1948 is access to sources and archives, which may have been destroyed, appropriated, censored, or otherwise made unavailable to some or all researchers. Linguistic barriers represent another hurdle, as most research is published exclusively in the author's native language and is not translated.

The historiography of 1948 is tied to political legitimacy in the present and has implications for the Israeli–Palestinian conflict. According to Avraham Sela and Neil Caplan:

A major reason for this grip of the past over the present is the unfulfilled quest of both Israelis and Palestinians for legitimacy, in one or more of the following three senses: (a) each party's sense of its own legitimacy as a national community entitled to its own sovereign state; (b) each party's willingness to grant legitimacy to at least part of the competing national narrative of the other; and (c) the international community's extension of legitimacy to the competing rights and claims of Israelis and Palestinians.

The narratives of 1948 have also had implications for Palestinian refugees.

=== Israeli narratives ===
Being the victors, the Israelis "were able to propagate more effectively than their opponents their version of this fateful war", in the words of Avi Shlaim. Only in 1987 was that narrative effectively challenged outside the Arab world.

==== Zionist narrative ====
Avi Shlaim gives the conventional Zionist narrative or the "old history" of the 1948 war as follows:

The conflict between Jews and Arabs in Palestine came to a head following the passage, on 29 November 1947, of the United Nations partition resolution that called for the establishment of two states, one Jewish and one Arab. The Jews accepted the U.N. plan despite the painful sacrifices it entailed, but the Palestinians, the neighboring Arab states, and the Arab League rejected it. Great Britain did everything in its power toward the end of the Palestine Mandate to frustrate the establishment of the Jewish state envisaged in the UN. plan. With the expiry of the Mandate and the proclamation of the State of Israel, seven Arab states sent their armies into Palestine with the firm intention of strangling the Jewish state at birth. The subsequent struggle was an unequal one between a Jewish David and an Arab Goliath. The infant Jewish state fought a desperate, heroic, and ultimately successful battle for survival against overwhelming odds. During the war, hundreds of thousands of Palestinians fled to the neighboring Arab states, mainly in response to orders from their leaders and despite Jewish pleas to stay and demonstrate that peaceful coexistence was possible. After the war, the story continues, Israeli leaders sought peace with all their heart and all their might but there was no one to talk to on the other side. Arab intransigence was alone responsible for the political deadlock, which was not broken until President Anwar Sadat's visit to Jerusalem thirty years later.

According to Shlaim, this narrative is "not history in the proper sense of the word", as most of the literature on the war was produced—not by professional academic historians—but rather by participants in the war, politicians, soldiers, and state-sponsored historians, as well as by sympathetic journalists, chroniclers, and biographers. It also portrays Israelis as morally superior, lacks political analysis, and gives undue weight to "the heroic feats of the Israeli fighters." This nationalist narrative was taught in Israeli schools and used for gaining legitimacy internationally.

==== New Historians ====
The standard Zionist narrative of the war remained unchallenged outside the Arab world until the war's fortieth anniversary, when a number of critical books came out, including Simha Flapan's The Birth of Israel: Myths and Realities (1987), Benny Morris's The Birth of the Palestinian Refugee Problem (1987), Ilan Pappé's Britain and the Arab-Israeli Conflict, 1948–51 (1988), and Shlaim's Collusion Across the Jordan: King Abdullah, the Zionist Movement and the Partition of Palestine (1988). These writers came to be known as New Historians or "post-Zionists". According to Shlaim, the new historians disagreed with the Zionist narrative on six main points: British policy with regard to the Yishuv at the end of the Palestine Mandate, the military balance in 1948, the origins of the Palestinian refugee problem, the nature of relations between Israelis and Jordanians during the war, Arab aims in the war, and the reasons peace remained elusive after the war.

Among their most vitriolic critics was Shabtai Teveth, biographer of David Ben-Gurion, who published "The New Historians", a series of four weekly full-page articles attacking the new historians, in Haaretz May 1989. Teveth claimed that the new historiography was flawed in its practice and that it was politically motived, that it was pro-Palestinian and aimed to delegitimize the State of Israel.

==== Neo-Zionist narratives ====
Ilan Pappé identifies a turn in predominant Israeli narratives about 1948 in September 2000. In the climate of the Second Intifada and in the Post-9/11 period, "not only were Israel's brutal military operations against the Palestinians during the new intifada seen as justified, but so was their systematic expulsion in 1948." Evidence of the expulsions, massacres, and war crimes of 1948 brought to light by the New Historians could no longer be ignored, but writers of what Pappé calls a "neo-Zionist" narrative justified these as necessary or unavoidable. In this period, the focus of Israeli historical writing on 1948 shifted largely from its human impact back to its military aspects. Neo-Zionist writers were given selective access to top-secret material, to which writers critical of Zionism would not have been given access, and much of their work was published by the Israeli Ministry of Defense.

Among those Pappé associated with the neo-Zionist perspective were Benny Morris (who had become more outspokenly defensive of Zionism by this time), Daniel Gutwein, Mordechai Bar-On, Yoav Gelber, Tamir Goren, Arnon Golan, Alon Kadish, and Yoav Peleg, as well as the journal Techelet.

=== Palestinian narratives ===
Unlike Israeli narratives that shifted over the decades, Palestinian narratives of 1948 have been more or less constant, focusing on Palestinians' indigenous rights to Palestine, Palestinian victimhood, dispossession, displacement, exile, statelessness, and more "unrequited grievances against colonialism and Zionism." The term 'Nakba' to describe the Palestinian catastrophe in the war of 1948 was coined in Constantin Zureiq's 1948 book Ma'na an-Nakba. Yoav Gelber identifies Aref al-Aref's six volume an-Nakba written in Arabic in the 1950s as thorough and notable.

Palestinian narratives have focused on countering the dominant Zionist narrative; the preëminent Palestinian historian of 1948 Walid Khalidi has dedicated much of his career to disproving the official Israeli narrative that the 1948 Palestinian expulsion and flight was voluntary.

Rashid Khalidi and other historians hold that "there is no established, authoritative Palestinian master narrative." They attribute this to, among other reasons, the dispersed and fragmented state of the Palestinian community and the loss, destruction, or appropriation by Israel of relevant documents and libraries. Without access to much in the way of archival materials, Palestinian historians have made use of oral history.

=== Arab narratives ===
In the narratives of the wider Arab-Muslim world, 1948 is seen as an "Arab debacle", representative of the region's social and political decline from its "glorious distant past". The official narratives of Arab states on 1948 tended to be apologetic with the goal of defending their political legitimacy, while the Arab nationalists wrote with a focus on distilling and extracting historical lessons to galvanize Arab society, politics, and ideology in preparation for the next conflict with Israel—neither approach bridled itself too much with historical accuracy.

=== United States narratives ===
The American journalist Joan Peters' 1984 book From Time Immemorial had a massive impact on how 1948 was understood in popular and political narratives in the United States.

Ilan Pappé asserts the neo-Zionist narrative was pushed in the United States most passionately by Michael Walzer, and by Anita Shapira and Derek Penslar with their 2003 Israeli Historical Revisionism: From Left to Right.

== In popular culture ==
A 1960 movie Exodus starring Paul Newman as Haganah rebel Ari Ben Canaan, a decorated former captain in the Jewish Brigade of the British Army in the Second World War, obtains a cargo ship. He smuggles 611 Jews out of a Cyprus camp run by the British and onto the ship for an illegal voyage to Mandatory Palestine. An American epic historical drama film about the founding of the State of Israel. Produced and directed by Otto Preminger, the screenplay was adapted from the 1958 novel of the same name by Leon Uris.

A 1966 movie Cast a Giant Shadow starring Kirk Douglas as US Colonel Mickey Marcus (1901–1948) who commanded units of the fledgling Israel Defense Forces during the 1948 Arab-Israeli War. One of the well known Israeli Machal soldiers, becoming Israel's first modern general (Hebrew: Aluf). He was killed by friendly fire.

A 1966 movie Judith (1966 film) starring Sophia Loren as Judith Auerbach Schiller, a Jewish former wife of a former German tank commander, General Gustav Schiller, who is teaching the Arabs battle tactics while in Palestine shortly before the end of the British mandate, the Haganah are unable to locate him but hopes that she can identify him. Judith and colleagues are smuggled into Damascus, and after days of searching, they find Schiller. As they are about to capture him, Judith shoots and wounds him. Schiller is smuggled back to Palestine and interrogated.

A 2015 PBS documentary, A Wing and a Prayer, depicts the Al Schwimmer-led airborne smuggling missions to arm Israel.

The 2021 historical drama film Farha tells the story of a Palestinian girl during the 1948 displacement of Palestinians from their homeland.

== See also ==
- Killings and massacres during the 1948 Palestine war
- List of battles and operations in the 1948 Palestine war
- List of modern conflicts in the Middle East

== Bibliography ==
- Abdel Jawad, Saleh (2006). "The Arab and Palestinian Narratives of the 1948 War". In Robert I. Rotberg (ed.). Israeli and Palestinian Narratives of Conflict: History's Double Helix. Indiana University Press. ISBN 978-0-253-21857-5.
- Caplan, Neil (19 September 2011). "War: Atzma'ut and Nakba". The Israel-Palestine Conflict: Contested Histories. John Wiley & Sons. ISBN 978-1-4443-5786-8.
- Yoav Gelber, Palestine 1948, Sussex Academic Press, Brighton, 2006, ISBN 978-1-84519-075-0
- Efraim Karsh, The Arab-Israeli Conflict: The Palestine War 1948, Osprey publishing, 2002.
- Walid Khalidi (ed.), All that remains. ISBN 978-0-88728-224-9.
- Walid Khalidi, Selected Documents on the 1948 Palestine War, Journal of Palestine Studies, 27(3), 79, 1998.
- Levett, Gordon (1991). "The 'Other' Airlift". Air Enthusiast. No. 44. pp. 17–25. ISSN 0143-5450.
- Benny Morris, 1948, Yale University Press, 2008, ISBN 978-0-300-12696-9
- Benny Morris, Righteous Victims, Vintage Books (reprint edition), 2001, ISBN 978-0679744757
- Benny Morris, The Birth of the Palestinian Refugee Problem, 1947-1949, Cambridge University Press, 2004, ISBN 978-0521009676
- Ilan Pappe, The Ethnic Cleansing of Palestine, Oneworld Publications, 2006, ISBN 978-1-85168-555-4
- Eugene Rogan & Avi Shlaim, The War for Palestine — Rewriting the history of 1948, Cambridge University Press, 2001.
- David Tal, War in Palestine, 1948. Strategy and Diplomacy, Routledge, 2004.
- Williamson, Bruce. "Caught in the Middle: Air Combat Between Israel and the RAF, 1948". Air Enthusiast 115, January–February 2005, pp. 2–10 ISSN 0143-5450
