= Mahal (Israel) =

Foreign volunteers who fought for Israel during the 1948 Arab–Israeli War

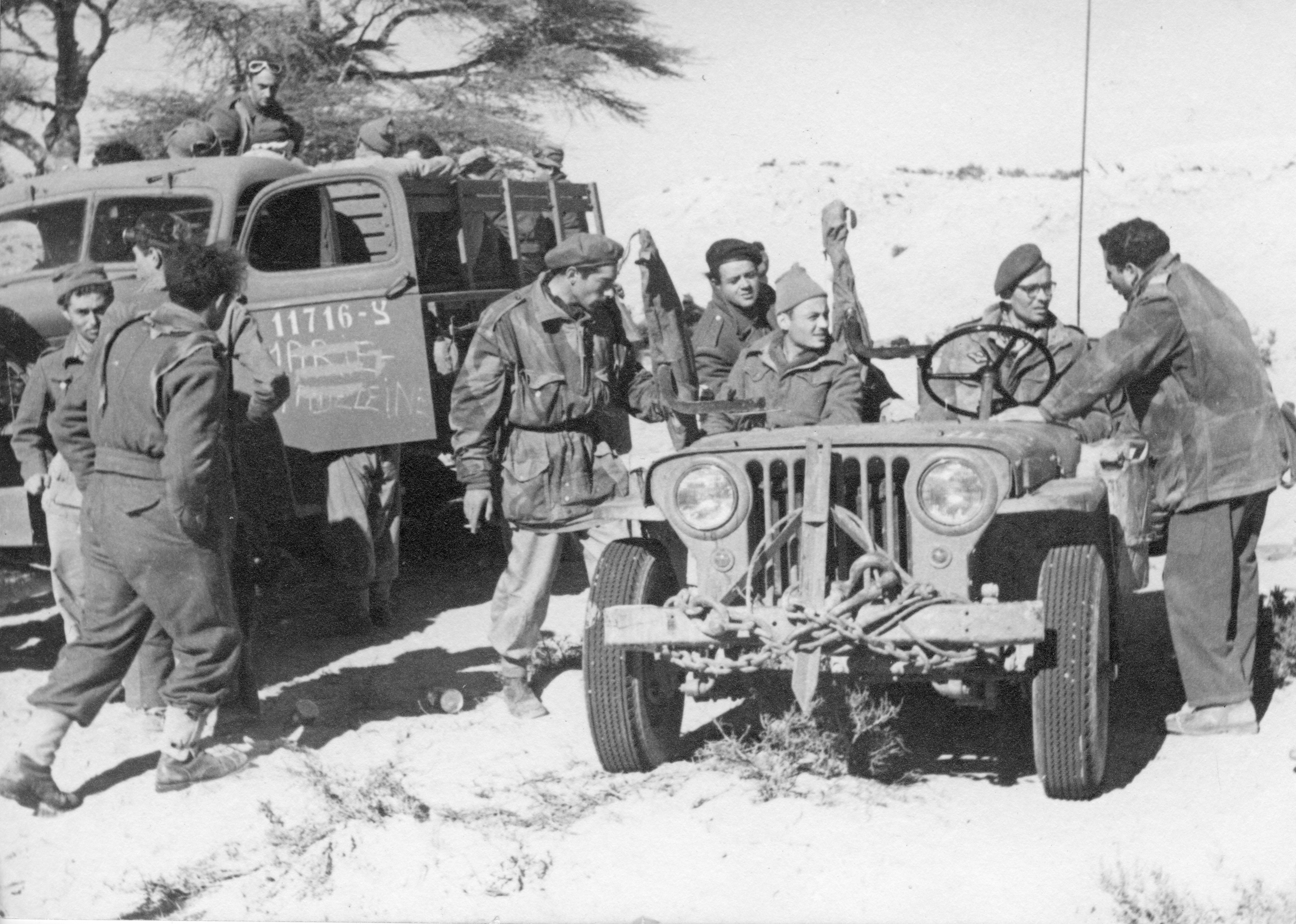
French Mahal volunteers in the Negev during Operation Horev

Mahal, more often spelled Machal (Hebrew: מח"ל), refers to the group of overseas volunteers who fought alongside Israeli forces during the 1948 Arab–Israeli War. Some 4,000 volunteers, mostly Jews, arrived from all over the world. Mahal is an acronym of Mitnadvei Hutz LaAretz (מתנדבי חוץ לארץ, lit. 'volunteers from abroad').

Mahal was disbanded after the war and most of the volunteers went home, although some remained in the country as permanent residents.

== History ==
Many members of Mahal were World War II veterans from United States and British Armed Forces. Allied armies were reduced considerably after the end of the war and many soldiers were demobilised; moreover, the service experience became mundane and did not suit some servicemen, particularly pilots. In various circumstances they were invited, or heard of the Jewish state's struggle for independence and volunteered. In some cases those who enlisted had no prior military experience. There were Jews and Christians, both ideological supporters of Zionism and mercenaries.

The Ha'apala movement, also called "Aliyah Bet", which attempted to evade the 1939 and 1948 British naval blockade restricting Jewish immigration to Palestine, was assisted by 236 Machal former servicemen of the Allied navies as crews of ten clandestine Jewish refugee ships, out of sixty-six participating vessels.

The 1948 Arab-Israeli War saw approximately 3500 foreign volunteers from 58 countries among the Jewish forces, out of an estimated 29,677–108,300 total (it grew considerably in size due to increasing levels of militarisation). A total of 123 Mahalniks were killed in battle (119 men and 4 women).

One of the most famous Machal volunteers was Mickey Marcus, a Jewish United States Army colonel who became Israel's first aluf (brigadier general). Marcus' wartime experience was vital in the 1948 Battle for Jerusalem. Other important Mahalniks were Canadian officer Ben Dunkelman and U.S. pilot Milton Rubenfeld, and Major Wellesley Aron, an English-born Palestinian Jew who had commanded a unit in the British Army during World War II. In 1947, while on a lecture tour of the United States, he was requested by the Haganah to organize the recruitment of men with "know-how" who could help in defending the newly established state.

== Aid to Israeli Air Force ==
The largest presence of Mahal was felt in the Israeli Air Force (IAF), making up nearly two-thirds of its personnel, to the point that English overtook Hebrew as the most widely used operational IAF service language.

During the 1948 War, Al Schwimmer, an American Mahal operative, used his World War II experience and his contacts to smuggle 30 surplus war planes to Israel in violation of an arms embargo imposed by President Harry S. Truman. These included Boeing B-17 Flying Fortresses, which were smuggled by way of the Azores to Czechoslovakia, then to Israel. Once in IAF hands, these planes bombarded a residential neighborhood near Qasr al-Qubba in Cairo on July 15, 1948.

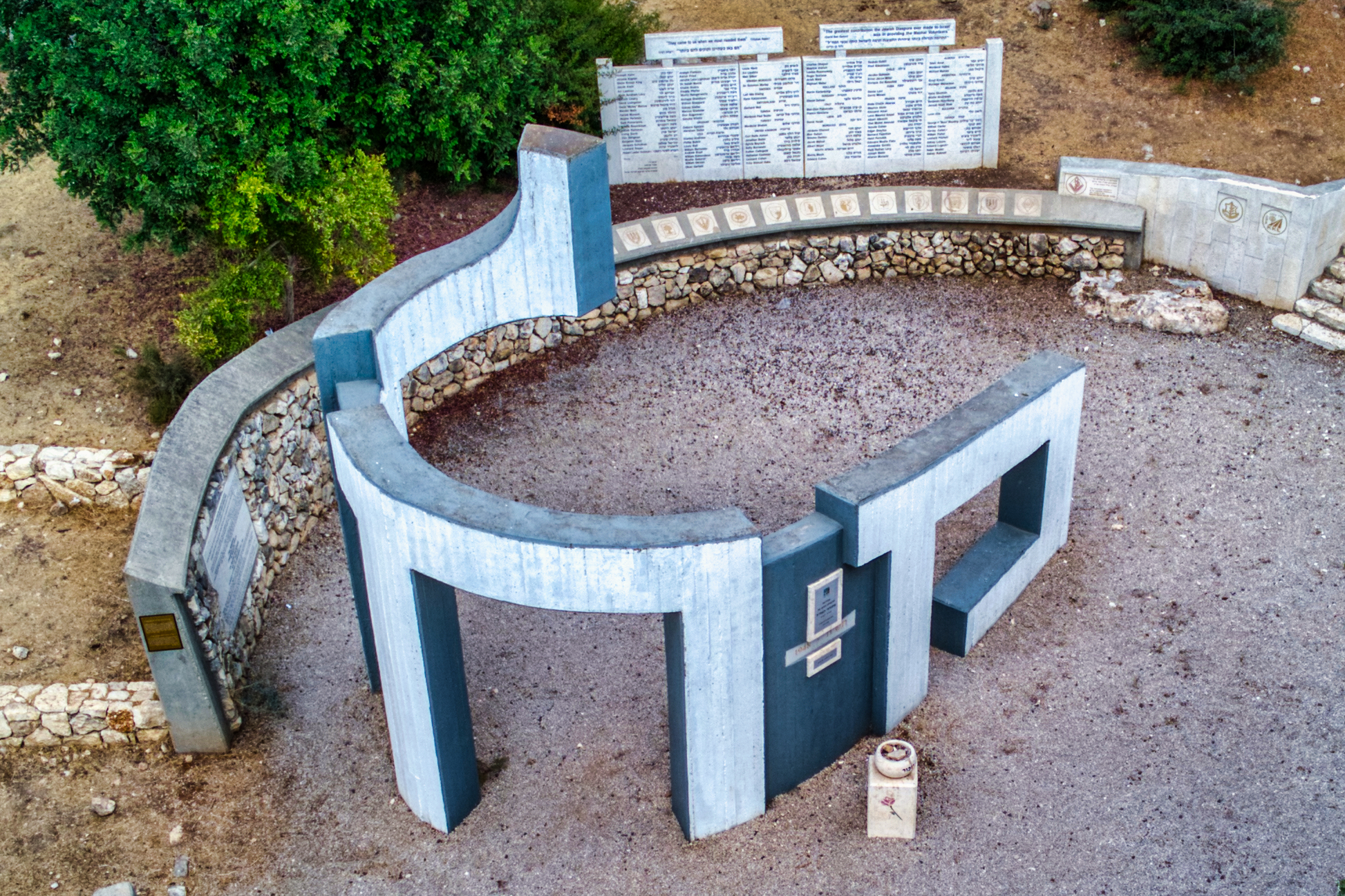
Mahal memorial (Shaar HaGai)

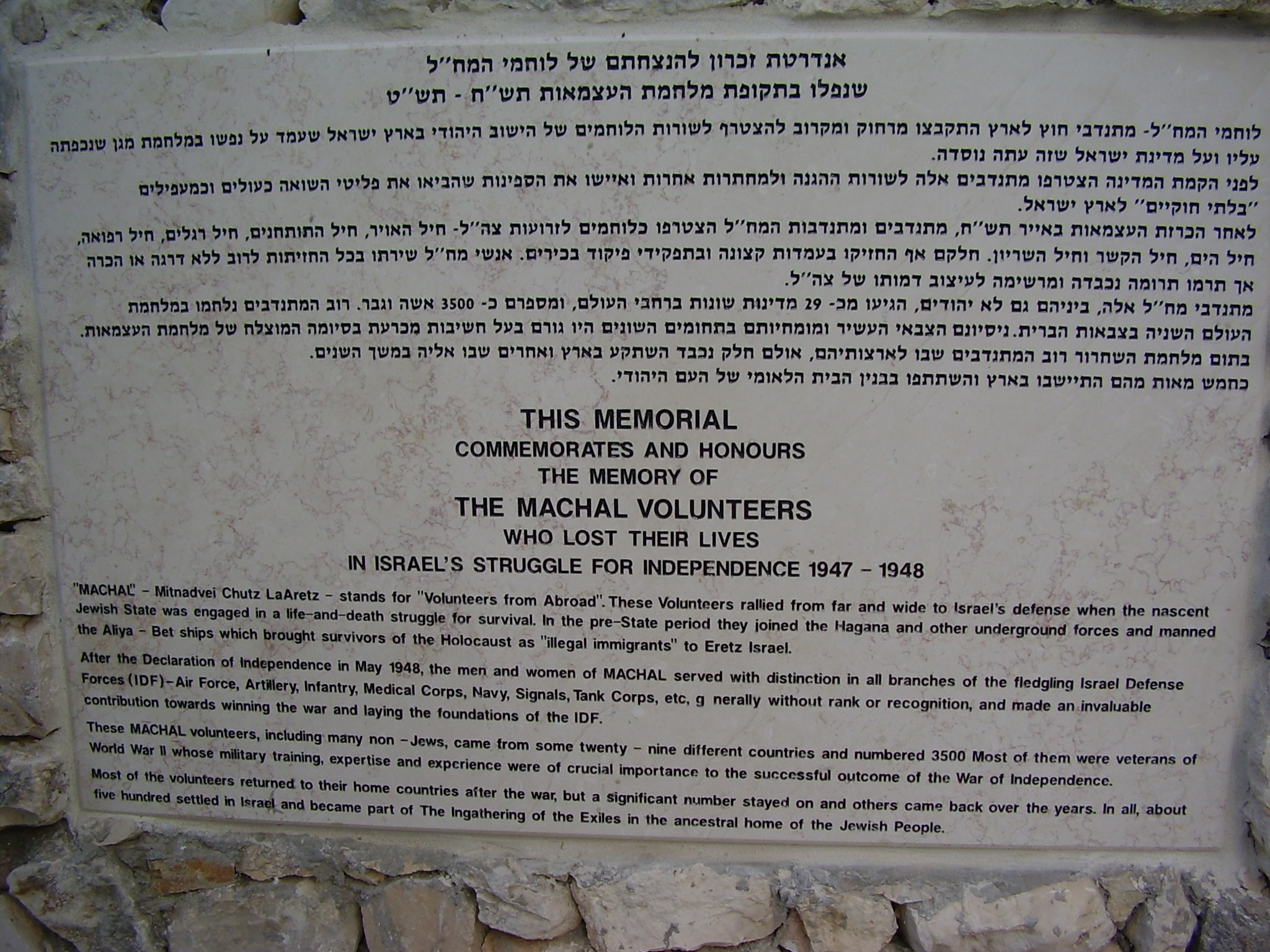
Inscription on Mahal memorial in Israel

Cargo flights flown by Mahal air crews transported weapons and supplies to Palestine from Europe, and thousands of Jewish refugees from Arab countries. During the Egyptian Army siege of the Negev region in 1948, Mahal pilots airlifted thousands of tons of supplies to communities behind enemy lines, usually by night landings of large cargo planes and converted airliners on makeshift, unpaved sand runways, hand lit by oil lamps. The national Israeli airline El Al was partially founded by Mahal veterans.

The integration of Mahal personnel into the Israel Defense Forces did not proceed without difficulty. Occasional tensions surfaced due to the superior pay and service conditions demanded by and given to the volunteers over resident or native Israeli soldiers, mainly in the air force; some of the volunteers were adventurers with little commitment to Zionism or to a rigid, disciplined hierarchy. This culminated in the disbandment of the Air Transport Division, following an "industrial action" by its Mahal personnel over pay conditions. The division was re-established with Israeli personnel.

Logistic support of the founding of the IAF was provided by various diaspora groups which procured planes in the critical months of 1948–9. One important such activity in Australia led to the export to Israel of six planes, despite the arms blockade enforced only against Israel amongst the combatants.

A few hours before the final cease-fire on 7 January 1949, a flight of four British RAF Spitfires (possibly from No. 208 Squadron RAF based in Egypt) bypassed the southern Israeli border on an aerial reconnaissance flight. They were attacked by a pair of Israeli Air Force Spitfires, resulting in three of the British planes being shot down. The Israeli Spitfires were flown by Mahal volunteers "Slick" Goodlin (USA) and John McElroy (Canada). Both were former US Army Air Forces and Royal Canadian Air Force pilots, veterans of the Second World War.

== Legacy and commemoration ==
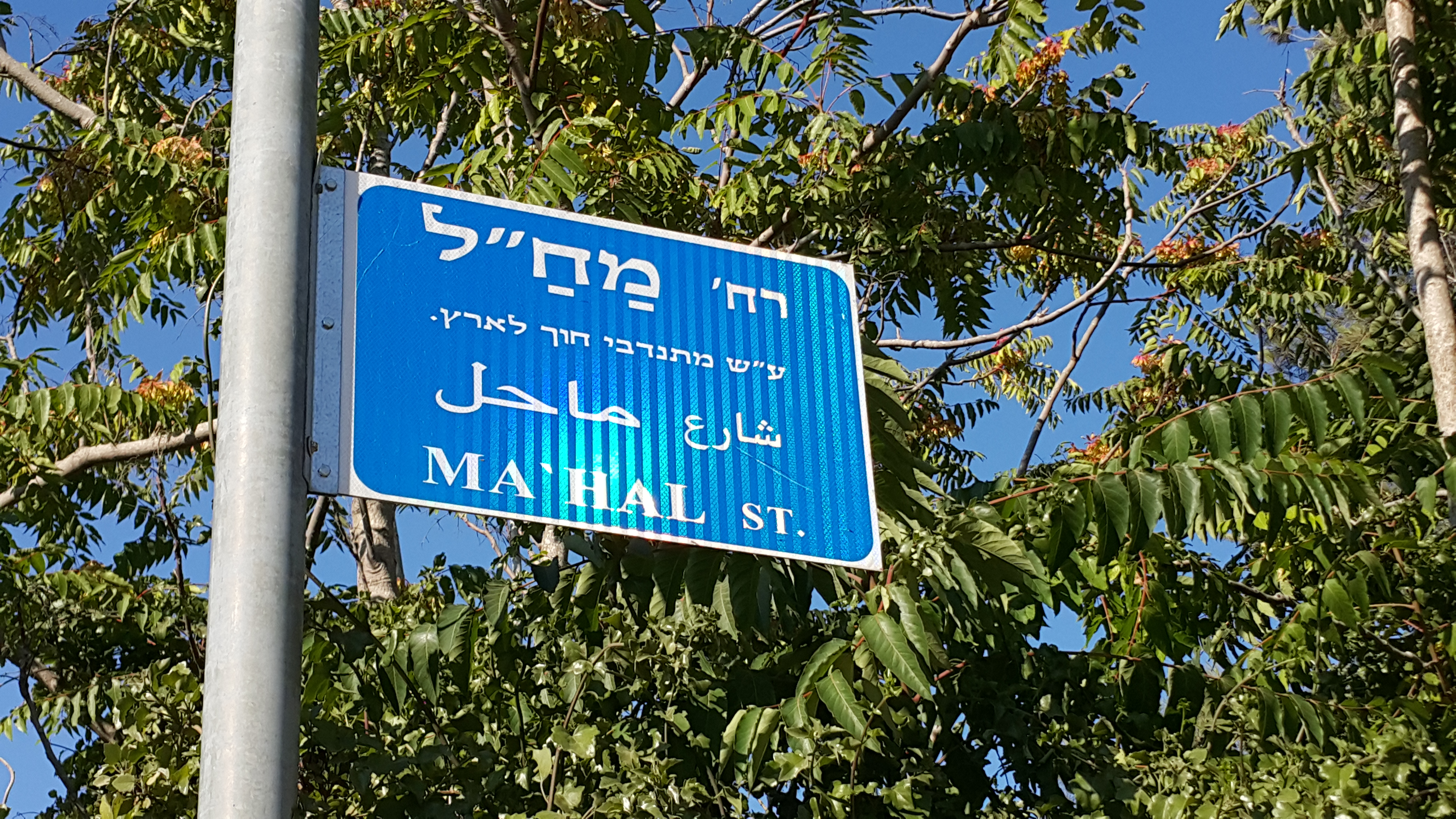
Mahal Street, Jerusalem

After the end of the war in 1949, the majority of the Mahal returned to their home countries. Some remained to live in Israel; the village of Kfar Daniel near Lod was founded by Mahal veterans from North America and the United Kingdom. Then Prime Minister David Ben-Gurion said "the Mahal Forces were the Diaspora's most important contribution to the survival of the State of Israel."

A memorial honoring the Mahal volunteers was erected near Sha'ar HaGai on the road from Tel Aviv to Jerusalem. On it is inscribed a verse from Joshua 1:14: "All those of valour shall pass armed among your brethren, and shall help them."

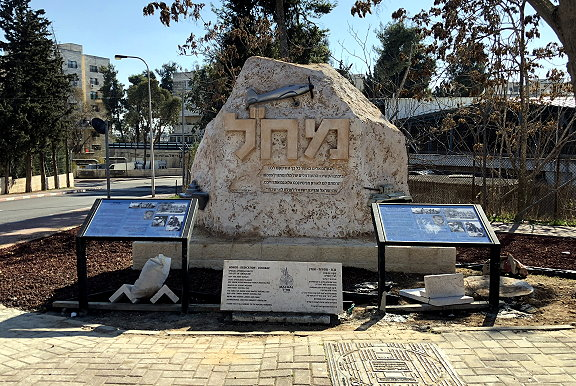
Jerusalem Memorial to Machal, the Foreign Volunteers who helped found Israel during the War of Independence.

Over the years, changing road configurations made accessibility to the Sha'ar HaGai memorial obscure with a corresponding, significant, drop off in visitation. Contemporary awareness of the vital role of Mahal in the birth of Israel diminished. The Jewish American Society for Historic Preservation recognized the problem and the necessity for historical memory. December 2017, a new Mahal memorial was dedicated on Mahal street in Jerusalem directly across from Jerusalem's Ammunition Hill Museum to the Battle of Ammunition Hill during the Six Days War.

The memorial, funded by the Jewish American Society for Historic Preservation, and the American Veterans of Israel Legacy Corporation, was designed by noted Israeli artist Sam Philipe. The Memorial is a massive relief boulder symbolizing Mahal as one of the foundational rocks in the birth of Israel. Mounted on the boulder are bronze sculpted symbols of branches of the Israel Defense Forces that Mahal contributed to, Air Force, Army, and Navy. The new Mahal memorial, with its interpretive historical signage, is seen by hundreds of thousands of visitors a year.

== Volunteer programs today ==
Overseas residents can serve in the IDF through various volunteer programs which are for young non-Israelis of Jewish background who are legal residents in Israel (and descendants of a Jewish grandparent) and overseas Israelis who are younger than 24 (men), 21 (women), 36 (physicians). The programs consist typically of 18 months of IDF service, including extended training for those joining combat units or 1 month of non-combat training. All overseas volunteers serve in regular Israeli military units.

Sar-El is another IDF volunteer program open to Jews and non-Jews which focuses on non-combat support.

== Notable Mahal members ==
- George Beurling, Canadian
- Ben Dunkelman, Canadian
- Mike Flanagan, Irish
- Arthur Goldreich, South African
- Chalmers Goodlin, American
- Lou Lenart, Hungarian-American
- Gordon Levett, British
- George Lichter, American
- Harold Livingston, American
- Ralph Lowenstein, American
- Mickey Marcus, American
- Milton "Milt" Rubenfeld, American
- Vidal Sassoon, British
- Samuel Herschel Schulman, American
- Al Schwimmer, American
- Sydney S. Shulemson, Canadian
- Harold Simon, South African
- Paul L. Smith, American
- Zev Sufott, British
- Bob Vickman, American

== See also ==
- Foreign Legion
- Lone soldier
- Garin Tzabar
- Above and Beyond, a 2014 documentary film about the Mahal
