= ID2020 =

Non-governmental organization

- Formation: June 27, 2014; 11 years ago
- Headquarters: New York City
- Executive director: Clive Smith
- Website: https://id2020.org/

ID2020 is an American 501(c)(3) nongovernmental organization which advocates for digital ID for the billion undocumented people worldwide and under-served groups like refugees. Clive Smith succeeded founder Dakota Gruener as executive director in 2022. The NGO was relatively unknown before being publicized because of misinformation related to the COVID-19 pandemic by conspiracy theorists.

== History ==
ID2020 was founded by John Edge on June 27, 2014, after being inspired by a screening of Meena.

On August 10, 2015, Dr. Alicia Carmona published a blog post on LinkedIn seeking input from her colleagues with examples where "identification/identity is at the core of a community problem." She noted that a new non-profit organization called Identification 2020 was soon to be formally launched.

On May 20, 2016, at the United Nations Headquarters in New York, the inaugural ID2020 summit brought together over 400 people to discuss how to provide digital identity to all, a defined Sustainable Development Goal including to 1.5 billion people living without any form of recognized identification. Experts in blockchain and other cryptographic technology joined with representatives of technical standards bodies to identify how technology and other private sector expertise could achieve the goal.

The 2018 summit was held in September 2018, and focused on defining what constitutes a "good" digital ID. Sponsors for the event included the United Nations Office of Information Communications Technology (OICT), United Nations Refugee Agency, International Telecommunication Union and the Consulate General of Denmark in New York.

In 2019, ID2020 started a new digital identity program in collaboration with the government of Bangladesh and Global Alliance for Vaccines and Immunization.

== Mission ==
ID2020 is a public-private consortium in service of the United Nations 2030 Sustainable Development Goal of providing legal identity for all people, including the world's most vulnerable populations.

ID2020 has published a ten-point mission statement, which includes: "We believe that individuals must have control over their own digital identities, including how personal data is collected, used, and shared."

== Participants ==
Organizations currently or formerly participating in the ID2020 initiative include:

- 500 Startups
- Accenture
- Acumen Fund
- Apne Aap
- Avanade
- Barclays
- BlackRock
- Blockstack
- Bloomberg L.P.
- Bloq
- BNY Mellon
- Brigham Young University
- Capgemini Consulting
- Care International
- City of Austin, Texas
- Cisco Systems
- Commonwealth Secretariat
- Cornell University
- Deloitte
- Depository Trust & Clearing Corporation (DTCC)
- Digital Asset Holdings
- Ernst & Young
- Facebook
- FHI 360
- Forbes
- Gavi, the Vaccine Alliance
- Global Fund for Women
- Google
- Government of Estonia
- Grameen Foundation
- Hyperledger
- IBM
- IDEO
- Infosys
- JPMorgan Chase
- Kaiser Permanente
- Kaye Scholer
- Kiva
- LexisNexis
- Mastercard
- Mercy Corps
- Microsoft
- MIT Media Lab
- Nasdaq
- National Cybersecurity Center
- Okta
- Omidyar Network
- Open Identity Exchange
- Plan International USA
- Privacy Commissioner for Bermuda
- PricewaterhouseCoopers
- Privacy Commissioner for Bermuda
- PricewaterhouseCoopers (PwC)
- Rockefeller Foundation
- Simprints
- United Nations International Computing Centre
- University of California, Berkeley

== COVID-19 conspiracy theory ==
Conspiracy theorists falsely alleged that ID2020 and Bill Gates made plans for mandatory COVID-19 vaccination and the implantation of microchips into patients' bodies. As a result of these conspiracy theories, the staff at ID2020 received death threats.
