= Slosson =

Slosson is a surname. Notable people with the surname include:

- Annie Trumbull Slosson (1838–1926), American writer and entomologist
- Edwin Emery Slosson (1865–1929), American editor, writer and chemist
- May Gorslin Preston Slosson (1858–1943), American educator and suffragist
