= Science journalism =

Journalism genre

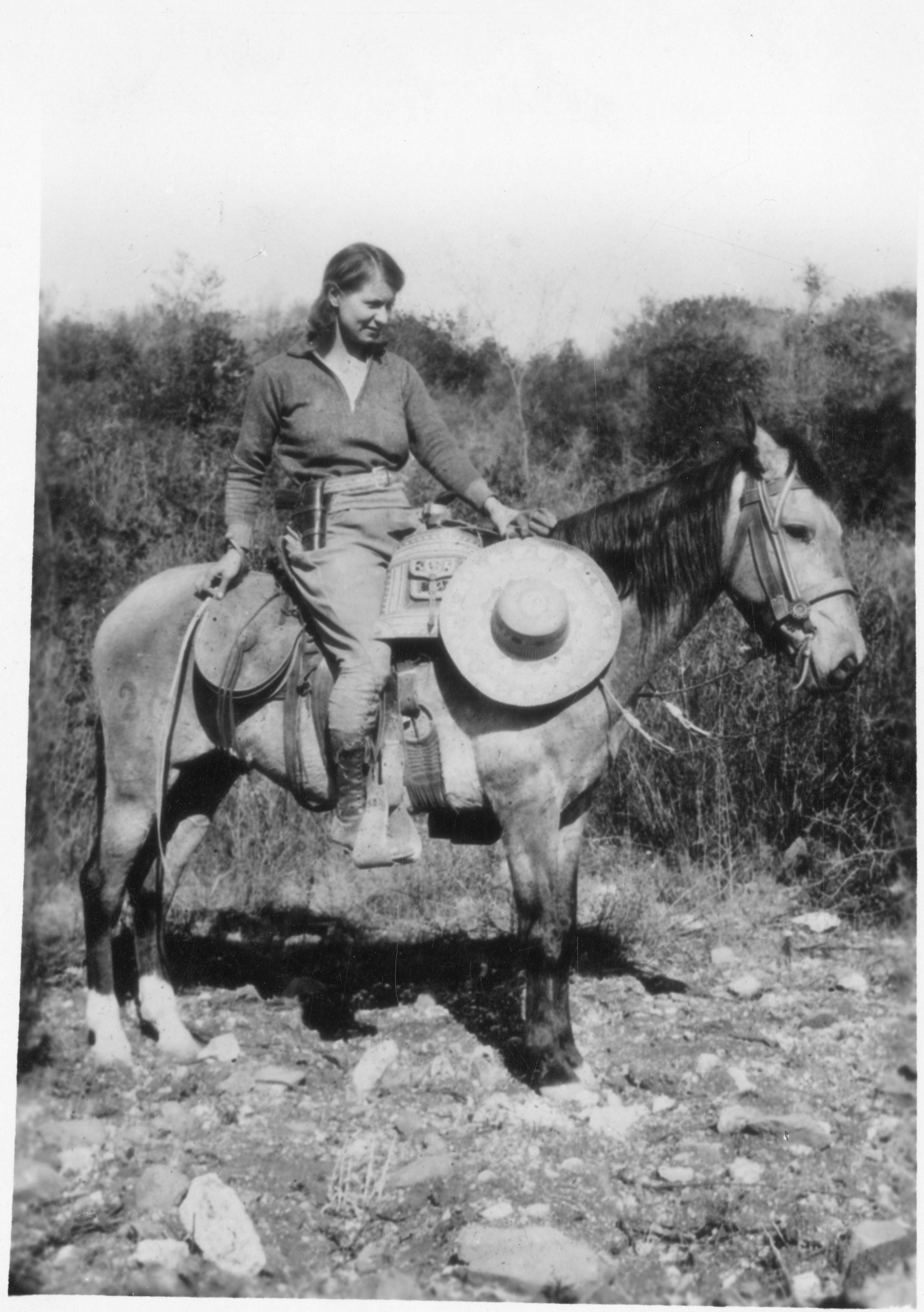
Emma Reh (1896–1982) was a science journalist for the Science Service in the 1920s and 1930s. Here she can be seen reporting on an archaeological site in Oaxaca for Science News.

Science journalism conveys reporting about science to the public. The field typically involves interactions between scientists, journalists and the public. There are many different examples of science writing. A few examples include feature writing, risk communication, blogs, science books, scientific journals, science podcasts and science magazines.

== Origins ==
Modern science journalism originated in weather and other natural history observations, as well as reports of new scientific findings, reported by almanacs and other news writing in the centuries following the advent of the printing press.

One early example dates back to Digdarshan (means showing the direction), which was an educational monthly magazine that started publication in 1818 from Srirampore, Bengal, India. Digdarshan carried articles on different aspects of science, such as plants, steam boat, etc. It was available in Bengali, Hindi and English languages.

In the U.S., Scientific American was founded in 1845, in another early example. One of the occasions an article was attributed to a 'scientific correspondent' was "A Gale in the Bay of Biscay" by William Crookes which appeared in The Times on 18 January 1871, page 7.

Thomas Henry Huxley (1825–1895) and John Tyndall (1820–1893) were scientists who were greatly involved in journalism and Peter Chalmers Mitchell (1864–1945) was Scientific Correspondent for The Times from 1918 to 1935.

However it was with James Crowther's appointment as the 'scientific correspondent' of The Manchester Guardian by C. P. Scott in 1928 that science journalism really took shape. Crowther related that Scott had declared that there was "no such thing" as science journalism, at which point Crowther replied that he intended to invent it. Scott was convinced and then employed him.

== Aims ==
Science values detail, precision, the impersonal, the technical, the lasting, facts, numbers and being right. Journalism values brevity, approximation, the personal, the colloquial, the immediate, stories, words and being right now. There are going to be tensions.

— Quentin Cooper, of BBC Radio 4's Material World,

The aim of a science journalist is to render very detailed, specific, and often jargon-laden information produced by scientists into a form that non-scientists can understand and appreciate while still communicating the information accurately. One way science journalism can achieve that is to avoid an information deficit model of communication, which assumes a top-down, one-way direction of communicating information that limits an open dialogue between knowledge holders and the public. One such way of sparking an inclusive dialogue between science and society that leads to a broader uptake of post-high school science discoveries is science blogs. Science journalists face an increasing need to convey factually correct information through storytelling techniques in order to tap into both the rational and emotional side of their audiences, the latter of which to some extent ensuring that the information uptake persists.

Science journalists often have training in the scientific disciplines that they cover. Some have earned a degree in a scientific field before becoming journalists or exhibited talent in writing about science subjects. However, good preparation for interviews and even deceptively simple questions such as "What does this mean to the people on the street?" can often help a science journalist develop material that is useful for the intended audience.

== Science journalist responsibility ==
Science journalists offer important contributions to the open science movement by using the Value Judgement Principle (VJP). Science journalists are responsible for "identifying and explaining major value judgments for members of the public." In other words, science journalists must make judgments such as what is good and bad (right and wrong). This is a very significant role because it helps "equip non-specialists to draw on scientific information and make decisions that accord with their own values". While scientific information is often portrayed in quantitative terms and can be interpreted by experts, the audience must ultimately decide how to feel about the information. Most science journalists begin their careers as either a scientist or a journalist and transition to science communication. One area in which science journalists seem to support varying sides of an issue is in risk communication. Science journalists may choose to highlight the amount of risk that studies have uncovered while others focus more on the benefits depending on audience and framing. Science journalism in contemporary risk societies leads to the institutionalisation of mediated scientific public spheres which exclusively discuss science and technology related issues. This also leads to the development of new professional relationship between scientists and journalists, which is mutually beneficial.

== Status ==
With budget cuts at major newspapers and other media, there are fewer working science journalists employed by traditional print and broadcast media than before. Similarly, there are currently very few journalists in traditional media outlets that write multiple articles on emerging science, such as nanotechnology.

In 2011, there were 459 journalists who had written a newspaper article covering nanotechnology, of whom 7 wrote about the topic more than 25 times.

In January 2012, just a week after The Daily Climate reported that worldwide coverage of climate change continued a three-year slide in 2012 and that among the five largest US dailies, the New York Times published the most stories and had the biggest increase in coverage, that newspaper announced that it was dismantling its environmental desk and merging its journalists with other departments.

News coverage on science by traditional media outlets, such as newspapers, magazines, radio and news broadcasts is being replaced by online sources. In April 2012, the New York Times was awarded two Pulitzer Prizes for content published by Politico and The Huffington Post (now HuffPost) both online sources, a sign of the platform shift by the media outlet.

Science information continues to be widely available to the public online. The increase in access to scientific studies and findings causes science journalism to adapt. "In many countries the public's main source of information about science and technology is the mass media." Science journalists must compete for attention with other stories that are perceived as more entertaining. Science information cannot always be sensationalized to capture attention and the sheer amount of available information can cause important findings to be buried. The general public does not typically search for science information unless it is mentioned or discussed in mainstream media first. However, the mass media are the most important or only source of scientific information for people after completing their education.

A common misconception about public interest surrounds science journalism. Those who choose which news stories are important typically assume the public is not as interested in news written by a scientist and would rather receive news stories that are written by general reporters instead. The results of a study conducted comparing public interest between news stories written by scientists and stories written by reporters concluded there is no significant difference. The public was equally interested in news stories written by a reporter and a scientist. This is a positive finding for science journalism because it shows it is increasingly relevant and is relied upon by the public to make informed decisions. "The vast majority of non-specialists obtain almost all their knowledge about science from journalists, who serve as the primary gatekeepers for scientific information." Ethical and accurate reporting by science journalists is vital to keeping the public informed.

Science journalism is reported differently than traditional journalism. Conventionally, journalism is seen as more ethical if it is balanced reporting and includes information from both sides of an issue. Science journalism has moved to an authoritative type of reporting where they present information based on peer reviewed evidence and either ignore the conflicting side or point out their lack of evidence. Science journalism continues to adapt to a slow journalism method that is very time-consuming but contains higher quality information from peer-reviewed sources. They also practice sustainable journalism that focuses on solutions rather than only the problem. Presenting information from both sides of the issue can confuse readers on what the actual findings show. Balanced reporting can actually lead to unbalanced reporting because it gives attention to extreme minority views in the science community, implying that both sides have an equal number of supporters. It can give the false impression that an opposing minority viewpoint is valid.

For example, a 2019 survey of scientists' views on climate change yielded a 100% consensus that global warming is human-caused. However, articles like "Climate Change: A Scientist and Skeptic Exchange Viewpoints," published by Divided We Fall in 2018, may unintentionally foster doubt in readers, as this particular scientist "did not say, as the media and the political class has said, that the science is settled."

The public benefits from an authoritative reporting style in guiding them to make informed decisions about their lifestyle and health.

Tracking the remaining experienced science journalists is becoming increasingly difficult. For example, in Australia, the number of science journalists has decreased to abysmal numbers: "you need less than one hand to count them." Due to the rapidly decreasing number of science journalists, experiments on ways to improve science journalism are also rare. However, in one of the few experiments conducted with science journalists, when the remaining population of science journalists networked online, they produced more accurate articles than when in isolation. New communication environments provide essentially unlimited information on a large number of issues, which can be obtained anywhere and with relatively limited effort. The web also offers opportunities for citizens to connect with others through social media and other 2.0-type tools to make sense of this information.

"After a lot of hand wringing about the newspaper industry about six years ago, I take a more optimistic view these days," said Cristine Russell, president of the Council for the Advancement of Science Writing. "The world is online. Science writers today have the opportunity to communicate not just with their audience but globally".

Blog-based science reporting is filling in to some degree, but has problems of its own.

One of the main findings is about the controversy surrounding climate change and how the media affects people's opinions on this topic. Survey and experimental research have discovered connections between exposure to cable and talk show radio channels and views on global warming. However, early subject analyses noticed that US media outlets exaggerate such scientific disputes around climate change that actually exist. A majority of Americans and Europeans view global warming as an outlying issue that will essentially affect future generations of individuals in other countries. This is a problem considering that they are getting most of their information from these media sources that are opinionated and not nearly as concerned with supplying facts to their viewers. Research found that after people finish their education, the media becomes the most significant, and for many individuals, the sole source of information regarding science, scientific findings and scientific processes. Many people fail to realize that information about science included from online sources is not always credible.

Since the 1980s, climate science and mass media have transformed into an increasingly politicized sphere. In the United States, Conservatives and Liberals understand global warming differently. Democrats often accept the evidence for global warming and think that it's caused by humans, while not many Republicans believe this. Democrats and liberals have higher and more steady trust in scientists, while conservative Republicans' trust in scientists has been declining. However, in the United Kingdom, mass media do not have nearly the impact on people's opinions as in the United States. They have a different attitude towards the environment which prompted them to approve the Kyoto Protocol, which works to reduce carbon dioxide emissions, while the U.S., the world's largest creator of carbon dioxide, has not done so.

The content of news stories regarding climate change are affected by journalistic norms including balance, impartiality, neutrality and objectivity. Balanced reporting, which involves giving equal time to opposing sides of a debate over has had a harmful impact on the media coverage of climate science.

== Criticism ==
Science journalists regularly come under criticism for misleading reporting of scientific stories. All three groups of scientists, journalists and the public often criticize science journalism for bias and inaccuracies. However, with the increasing collaborations online between science journalists there may be potential with removing inaccuracies. The 2010 book Merchants of Doubt by historians of science Naomi Oreskes and Erik M. Conway argues that in topics like the global warming controversy, tobacco smoking, acid rain, DDT and ozone depletion, contrarian scientists have sought to "keep the controversy alive" in the public arena by demanding that reporters give false balance to the minority side. Very often, such as with climate change, this leaves the public with the impression that disagreement within the scientific community is much greater than it actually is. Science is based on experimental evidence and testing, and disputation is a normal activity.

Scholars have criticized science journalists for:

- Uncritical reporting
- Emphasizing frames of scientific progress and economic prospect
- Not presenting a range of expert opinion
- Having preferences toward positive messages
- Reporting unrealistic timelines and engaging in the production of a "cycle of hype"

Science journalists can be seen as the gatekeepers of scientific information. Just like traditional journalists, science journalists are responsible for what truths reach the public.

Scientific information is often costly to access. This is counterproductive to the goals of science journalism. Open science, a movement for "free availability and usability of scholarly publications," seeks to counteract the accessibility issues of valuable scientific information. Freely accessible scientific journals will decrease the public's reliance on potentially biased popular media for scientific information.

Many science magazines, along with newspapers like The New York Times and popular science shows like PBS Nova tailor their content to relatively highly educated audiences. Many universities and research institutions focus much of their media outreach efforts on coverage in such outlets. Some government departments require journalists to gain clearance to interview a scientist, and require that a press secretary listen in on phone conversations between government funded scientists and journalists.

Many pharmaceutical marketing representatives have come under fire for offering free meals to doctors in order to promote new drugs. Critics of science journalists have argued that they should disclose whether industry groups have paid for a journalist to travel, or has received free meals or other gifts.

Science journalism finds itself under a critical eye due to the fact that it combines the necessary tasks of a journalist along with the investigative process of a scientist.

=== Chocolate hoax ===
In 2015, John Bohannon produced a deliberately bad study to see how a low-quality open access publisher and the media would pick up their findings. He worked with a film-maker Peter Onneken who was making a film about junk science in the diet industry with fad diets becoming headline news despite terrible study design and almost no evidence. He invented a fake "diet institute" that lacked even a website, used the pen name "Johannes Bohannon" and fabricated a press release.

== See also ==
- Academic bias
- Columbia Journalism Review
- False balance
- Frontiers of Science, defunct illustrated comic strip
- Further research is needed
- MATTER, magazine
- Knight Science Journalism Fellowships, a science journalism fellowship program launched in 1983
- Open science
- Popular science
- Public awareness of science
- Science by press conference
- Science communication
- Scientific literature
- Undark Magazine, science magazine published under the auspices of the Knight Science Journalism Fellowship program
