= Deborah Ahenkorah =

Ghanaian activist

Deborah Ahekorah
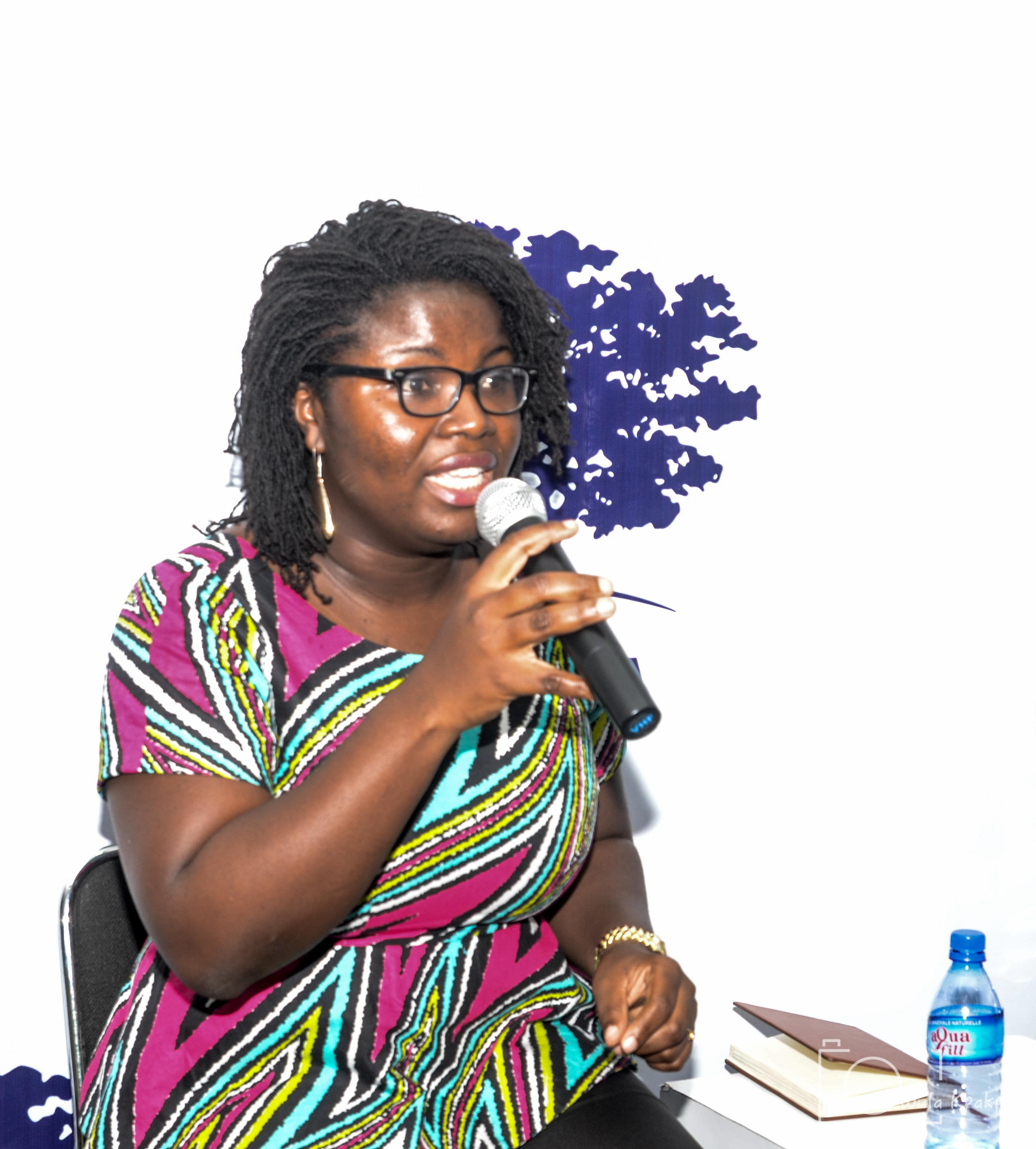
- Speaking at Ashoka Changemakers Summit in Accra.
- Born: 20 April 1987 (age 39); Accra, Ghana
- Education: Bryn Mawr College

Deborah Ahenkorah (born 20 April 1987) is a Ghanaian educator and activist, co-founder and CEO of Golden Baobab, a social enterprise that aims to promote African literature for children, awarding the annual Golden Baobab Prize. She studied at Bryn Mawr College, and has been named by the Echoing Green Fellowship as "one of the most innovative contributions to change in today's world." In 2013, Ahenkorah was part of the New Voices Fellowship at the Aspen Institute.

== Biography ==
Ahenkorah was born and raised in Accra, Ghana. She attended Bryn Mawr College, where she served as co-chair of the "Bryn Mawr's African Students" organization. She hold Bachelor of Arts-Psychology and Archaeology from University of Ghana.

She was also the founder of Project Educate in Africa, and a resident consultant and participant in the Global Fund for Children and the European Union Parliament. Ahenkorah was part of the Starting Bloc Fellowship, and was also involved in the Goldman Sachs Women's Summit.

Her organization, Golden Baobab is a literary nonprofit social enterprise committed to the development of children’s literature across Africa.
