= FNZ =

FNZ may refer to:

- FNZ (company), financial services company
- Fibronectin
- FnZ, Australian record production and songwriting duo also known as Finatik N Zac
- Future New Zealand, a defunct political party of New Zealand
