= DAML =

DAML may refer to:

- DARPA Agent Markup Language, a markup language for the Semantic Web
- Digitally Added Main Line, a method for multiplexing, i.e. transmitting and receiving multiple telephone transmission signals over a single twisted pair
- Digital Asset Modeling Language, a "smart contract" language
