= Blythe Masters =

British economist (born 1969)

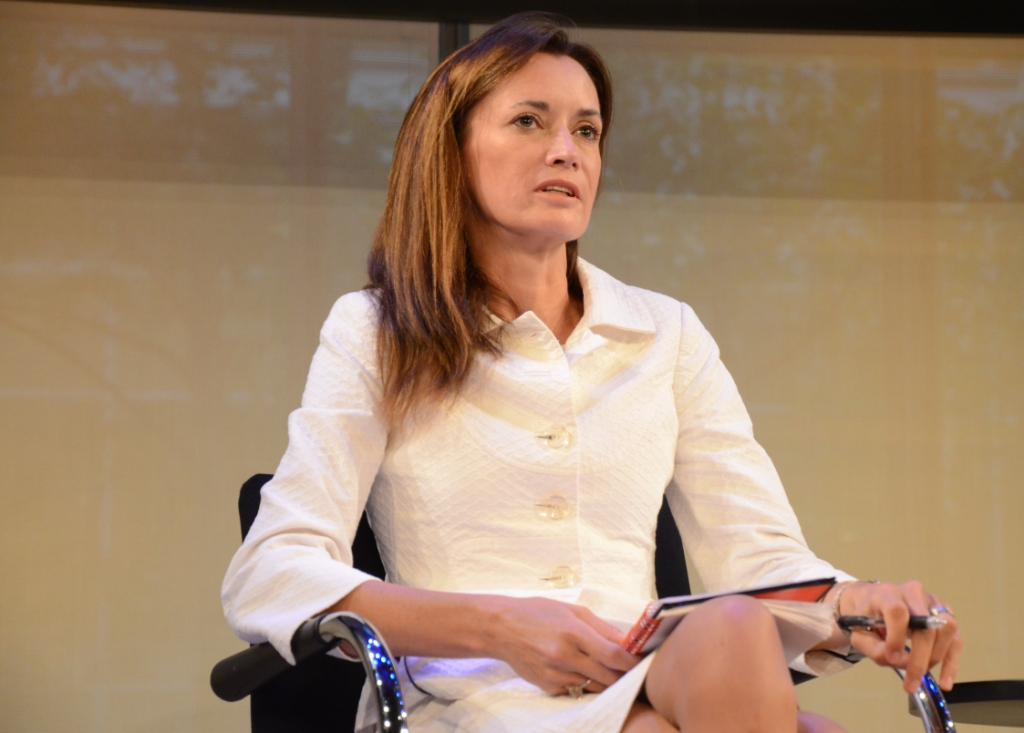
- Masters speaking in 2015
- Born: Blythe Sally Jess Levett; 22 March 1969 (age 57); Oxford, United Kingdom
- Education: The King's School, Canterbury
- Alma mater: Trinity College, Cambridge
- Occupations: Group CEO of FNZ; Former CEO Digital Asset Holdings LLC; Former executive at J.P. Morgan
- Known for: Entrepreneur in financial services
- Parent: Gordon Levett (father)

Blythe Sally Jess Masters (née Levett; born 22 March 1969) is a British private equity, financial services, and fintech executive. She is a former executive at JPMorganChase, where she was widely credited for developing the credit default swap as a financial instrument.

She is a founding partner of fintech-focused private equity firm, Motive Partners, Group CEO of FNZ, an advisory board member of the Chamber of Digital Commerce, an independent board member of SymphonyAI, and holds the position of Non-Executive Chair at J.P. Morgan Securities in the UK. she is the former CEO of special-purpose acquisition company, Motive Capital Corp, and a former board member of Credit Suisse Group.

== Early life and education ==
Born in Oxford, Masters was raised in the south-east of England. She attended The King's School in Canterbury. She graduated in 1991 from Trinity College, Cambridge with a B.A. in economics. Blythe is the daughter of RAF and IAF pilot Gordon Levett.

== Career ==
=== JPMorganChase ===
Masters joined JPMorganChase in 1991, after completing a number of student internships. Masters became a managing director at 28. She is widely credited with creating the modern credit default swap, a derivative used to manage credit exposure to underlying reference entities. In 1994, J.P. Morgan had extended a $4.8 billion credit line to Exxon, which faced the threat of $5 billion in punitive damages for the Exxon Valdez oil spill. A team of J.P. Morgan bankers led by Masters then purchased credit protection against the credit line to the European Bank of Reconstruction and Development to cut the capital which J.P. Morgan was required to hold against Exxon's default, thus reducing its own risk. J.P. Morgan later bundled together packages of such exposures and offered them to market as BISTRO, for Broad Index Secured Trust Offering, and these new financial instruments were quickly adopted by other banking institutions.

Masters was described by the UK newspaper The Guardian as "the woman who invented financial weapons of mass destruction". The paper later apologised for failing to give Masters an adequate opportunity to respond to their characterisation. She stated support for reforms which increase transparency and reduce the risk of contagion among financial firms.

From 2001 to 2004, Masters served as the bank's head of Global Credit Portfolio and Credit Policy and Strategy. From 2004 to 2007, she was Chief Financial Officer of J.P. Morgan's Investment Bank. In 2007, she was named head of Global Commodities. In 2014, J.P. Morgan announced the sale of its physical commodities business for $3.5bn in the face of increased regulatory scrutiny brought on by a Federal Energy Regulatory Commission investigation into the bank’s alleged manipulation of energy markets in California and Michigan. J.P. Morgan paid $410 million to settle the investigation without admitting wrongdoing. J.P. Morgan defended Masters, stating that "We strongly dispute that Blythe Masters or any employee lied or acted inappropriately in this matter". Masters left J.P. Morgan once she had completed the sale for the bank.

Masters was the Chair of the Securities Industry and Financial Markets Association from 2008 to 2010 and also of the Global Financial Markets Association from 2012 to 2014, trade associations whose missions include promoting public trust and confidence in financial markets.

=== 2015–2025 ===
Masters was named the CEO of Digital Asset Holdings in March 2015, a company that builds secure and distributed processing tools to speed up settlement, reduce costs and enhance security and transparency in regulated industries. The startup raised more than $100 million in multiple rounds of funding from fifteen firms, which included Citibank, Goldman Sachs, and JPMorgan. The company distributed ledger systems for the Australian Securities Exchange (ASX), DTCC and others. In December 2018, Masters announced that she was stepping down as CEO, but would remain a board member, strategic advisor and a shareholder.

From 2015 to 2016, Masters was the chairwoman of Santander Consumer Holdings Inc. (NYSE: SC), a full-service, technology-driven consumer finance company.

Bloomberg named Masters one of the 50 most influential people of the year in 2016.

In 2019, Masters joined Motive Capital Partners, a private equity firm. On 30 December 2019, Masters was appointed to the board of directors of Phunware, and was named its chair in March 2020. A year later, she informed Phunware that she was resigning from the board.

In April 2021, Masters was elected to the Board of Directors of Credit Suisse Group AG. In December that year, she joined Wilshire Associates as chair of its new Digital Assets Advisory Group. In September 2021, Motive announced that she was leading Motive's acquisition of Forge Global, a pre-IPO stock marketplace, via a special-purpose acquisition company merger valued at approximately $2 billion.

In August 2024, Masters was appointed as the Group CEO of FNZ.

In February 2025, Masters rejoined JPMorgan as chair of its securities unit in the UK.

== Personal life ==
Masters is Co-Chair of the Board of the Global Fund for Women, a board member of both The Breast Cancer Research Foundation and ID2020, and the former Chair of the Board of the Greater NY Affiliate of the breast cancer charity, Susan G. Komen for the Cure. She is an amateur equestrian.

She was married to Daniel Masters, who also worked on the commodities desk at JPMorgan. The couple divorced in 2001. They have a daughter. Masters then married a self-employed investor, Gareth Evans.
