= Maya Ajmera =

American writer

Maya Ajmera is the president and CEO of Society for Science and executive publisher of Science News.

Ajmera is the founder of Global Fund for Children, a nonprofit organization that invests philanthropic capital in innovative community-based organizations working with some of the world's most vulnerable children and youth.

She is the author of the 2016 book Invisible Children: Reimagining International Development at the Grassroots with Gregory A. Fields, published by Palgrave Macmillan. Ajmera is also the author of over twenty children's books, including Children from Australia to Zimbabwe: A Photographic Journey Around the World, Extraordinary Girls, To Be an Artist, Faith, and Healthy Kids.

== Biography ==
=== Early life and education ===
Raised in eastern North Carolina by Indian immigrants, Ajmera graduated from the North Carolina School of Science and Mathematics in Durham. She holds a bachelor's degree in biology from Bryn Mawr College and a master's degree in public policy from the Sanford School of Public Policy at Duke University.

=== Career ===
Ajmera founded The Global Fund for Children in 1994 at the age of 25. The inspiration came from a trip she took to India on a Rotary Fellowship a few years earlier. While waiting for a train she saw a group of children being taught by a teacher on a train platform. Ajmera learned that these children were students in a Train Platform School for impoverished children who could not attend school. Moved by what she saw, instead of attending medical school Ajmera started classes at Duke University's Sanford School of Public Policy; with facilities provided by Duke and professor William Ascher she applied for and won a seed grant from Echoing Green. This initial funding helped her build an organization to support innovative grassroots efforts on behalf of vulnerable children around the world.

During her tenure years with the organization, the Global Fund for Children gave nearly $25 million in capital to nearly 500 grassroots organizations in 75 countries. These grants have served more than seven million children around the world. Ajmera left her position as president in 2011, after eighteen years, and remained on GFC's board of directors until 2013.

Since 2011, Ajmera is a professorial lecturer at the Paul H. Nitze School of Advanced International Studies at Johns Hopkins University, and served as a visiting scholar from 2011 to 2013.

For the 2013–2014 school year, Ajmera served as the inaugural Social Entrepreneur in Residence for Duke University and a visiting professor of the Practice of Public Policy at the Sanford School of Public Policy at Duke.

As of August 2014, Ajmera is the president and CEO of Society for Science and Executive Publisher of Science News. The Society is known for its world-class science competitions, including the Regeneron Science Talent Search, the Regeneron International Science and Engineering Fair and the Thermo Fisher Scientific Junior Innovators Challenge (JIC). She was a member of the Honors Group of the Westinghouse Science Talent Search, now sponsored by Regeneron.

Maya serves on the boards of directors of Kids in Need of Defense, North Carolina School of Science and Mathematics Foundation, and Sibley Memorial Hospital/Johns Hopkins Medicine.

Ajmera is a trustee for the North Carolina School of Science and Math and is on the Board of Visitors of the Sanford School of Public Policy at Duke University. She also serves on numerous advisory boards, including the Center for Advanced Social Entrepreneurship (CASE) at Duke University, and the American India Foundation. Maya served previously on the Advisory Board of the Golden Baobob Prize.

She was a trustee for the Blue Moon Fund and served on the Washington Area Women's Foundation board for nine years before becoming part of that organization's Leadership Council.

=== Personal ===
Maya Ajmera is married to David Hollander Jr., and they have one daughter. She is of Rajasthani descent on her father's side and of Bihari descent on her mother's side.

== Honors and awards ==
Ajmera was the recipient of a Rotary International Graduate Fellowship to study in South Asia in 1989–1990. She was also the recipient of the 1993-1997 Echoing Green Public Service Graduate Fellowship and the William C. Friday Fellowship for Human Relations of North Carolina.

In October 2007, Maya Ajmera was featured on CNN's Heroes segment. Actress Mira Sorvino named Ajmera as her hero.

In June 2008, Maya Ajmera received the Women of Distinction award at the 2008 National Conference for College Women Student Leaders at Georgetown University. The award is given to women who have made amazing accomplishments in their professions and who serve as inspiring role models for female students.

She served on the Innovation and Civil Society subgroup of the Obama Presidential Transition's Technology, Innovation, and Government Reform Policy Working Group.

Ajmera was a member of the 2011 class of Henry Crown Fellows at the Aspen Institute.

In May 2014, she received the Rotary International's Global Alumni Service to Humanity Award, presented at the Rotary Global Convention in Sydney, Australia.

In 2020, Maya was honored with the National Science Board's Public Service Award for her significant efforts to enhance public awareness and understanding of science and engineering. She is also a distinguished member of the American Academy of Arts and Sciences.

In May 2021, Ajmera received an honorary degree from Cedar Crest College, where she also delivered the keynote address.

== Published works ==
- Invisible Children: Reimagining International Development at the Grassroots by Maya Ajmera with Gregory A. Fields. Palgrave Macmillan 2016.

== Published children's works ==
- Xanadu: The Imaginary Place Edited by Maya Ajmera and Olateju Omolodun. Charlesbridge 1999.
- Extraordinary Girl By Maya Ajmera, Olateju Omolodun, and Sarah Strunk. Charlesbridge 1999.
- Let the Games Begin! By Maya Ajmera and Michael J. Regan. Charlesbridge 2000.
- Children from Australia to Zimbabwe By Maya Ajmera and Anna Rhesa Versola. Charlesbridge 2001.
- Come Out and Play By Maya Ajmera and John D. Ivanko. Charlesbridge 2001.
- To Be a Kid By Maya Ajmera and John D. Ivanko. Charlesbridge 2001.
- Back to School By Maya Ajmera and John D. Ivanko. Charlesbridge 2001.
- A Kid's Best Friend By Maya Ajmera and Alex Fisher. Charlesbridge 2002.
- Animal Friends By Maya Ajmera and John D. Ivanko. Charlesbridge 2002.
- To Be an Artist By Maya Ajmera and John D. Ivanko. Charlesbridge 2004.
- Be My Neighbor By Maya Ajmera and John D. Ivanko. Charlesbridge 2004.
- Children of the USA By Maya Ajmera, Arlene Hirschfelder, Yvonne Wakim Dennis, and Cynthia Pon. Charlesbridge 2008.
- Faith By Maya Ajmera, Magda Nakassis and Cynthia Pon. Charlesbridge 2009.
- Our Grandparents: A Global Album By Maya Ajmera, Sheila Kinkade and Cynthia Pon. Charlesbridge, 2010.
- What We Wear: Dressing Up Around the World By Maya Ajmera, Elise Dertine, and Cynthia Pon. Charlesbridge 2012.
- Global Baby Girls By Maya Ajmera. Charlesbridge 2013.
- Healthy Kids By Maya Ajmera, Victoria Dunning and Cynthia Pon. Charlesbridge 2013.
- Music Everywhere! By Maya Ajmera, Elise Hoter Derstine and Cynthia Pon. Charlesbridge 2014.
- Global Baby Boys By Maya Ajmera. Charlesbridge 2014.
- Global Baby Bedtimes By Maya Ajmera. Charlesbridge 2015.
- Every Breath We Take By Maya Ajmera and Dominique Browning. Charlesbridge 2016.
- Global Baby Playtime By Maya Ajmera. Charlesbridge 2021.
- Global Baby Grandparents By Maya Ajmera. Charlesbridge 2024.

Many of Maya's books have forewords written by prominent individuals, including Archbishop Desmond Tutu, Melinda French Gates, Julianne Moore, Bill Bradley, Marian Wright Edelman, John Hope Franklin, and even Kermit the Frog.

== Interviews and speeches ==
Interview with the Clinton Global Initiative, 2007

Interview with Think Change India, 2008

Appearance on NPR's Tell Me More, 2008

Interview with The Financial Times, 2008

Appearance on Dallas NPR Station KERA, 2009

TEDxAshokaU: Universities Driving Global Change at Duke University, February 25, 2011

TEDxSMU, 2011

William D. Reimert Lecture, Cedar Crest College, 2011.
