= Edwin Emery Slosson =

American academic (1865–1929)

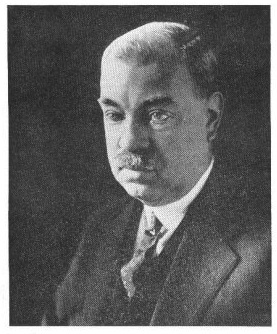
- Born: June 7, 1865; Albany, Kansas, US
- Died: October 15, 1929 (aged 64); Washington, D.C., US
- Known for: Founding Director of Science Service
- Spouse: May Gorslin Preston (m. 1891)

Edwin Emery Slosson (June 7, 1865 – October 15, 1929) was an American magazine editor, writer, journalist and chemist. He was the first head of Science Service, and a notable popularizer of science.

== Family background and education ==
Slosson was born in Albany, Kansas, the son of William Butler Slosson and his wife, the former Achsah Louise Lilly. His parents were pioneers who had moved from New York State to Kansas in 1857. William Slosson ran the first general store in Albany. A supporter of free state status for Kansas, he helped to organize a branch of the Underground Railroad and ran a "station" where escaping slaves were sheltered.

Slosson attended Leavenworth High School for three years and travelled in Europe before entering the University of Kansas. He majored in chemistry and was a member of both Sigma Xi and Phi Beta Kappa. After obtaining a Bachelor of Science degree in 1890, he remained at the University of Kansas as a graduate student, studying chemistry, physics, geology and psychology. He was awarded a Master of Science degree in 1892. Slosson was offered a fellowship in psychology at Clark University, but chose instead to accept a position as assistant professor of chemistry at the University of Wyoming because it paid well enough to allow him to marry. He married May Gorslin Preston at Centralia, Kansas, on August 12, 1891.

== University of Wyoming ==
From 1891 to 1903 Slosson lived in Laramie, Wyoming, where he taught chemistry at the University of Wyoming and carried out chemical research at the Wyoming Agricultural Experiment Station, which was associated with the university. He also acted as state chemist. His main areas of research were alkali in Wyoming soils and petroleum. His observations on these and other subjects, including food adulteration and the fuel value of prepared cereals, were published in numerous bulletins of the Experiment Station. He participated as a special demonstrator in chemistry at the 1893 Chicago World's Fair.

Slosson taught all the chemistry courses at the University of Wyoming and taught popular extension courses in chemistry to community members. He also taught a course in experimental psychology and lectured on photography to the local Camera Club. During the summer vacations he studied organic chemistry at the University of Chicago, working under Julius Stieglitz and John Nef. He completed his doctoral dissertation and was awarded his PhD degree magna cum laude in 1902.

== The Independent ==
While living in Laramie, Slosson had contributed articles to The Independent, a weekly magazine published in New York City. After his doctoral studies, he spent the summer of 1903 in New York, working as an unpaid assistant to Hamilton Holt, the magazine's editor and publisher. He returned to Laramie in the fall, but when Holt offered him the position of literary editor on The Independent he accepted the offer and moved with his family to New York in 1904.

He was connected with The Independent until 1920 as literary or managing editor and contributor. He wrote many articles for the magazine and his journalism formed the basis for several books. On behalf of the magazine, he travelled around the United States visiting universities and visited Europe to interview leading philosophers and writers, including Henri Bergson, H. G. Wells, and Ernst Haeckel. The resulting articles were collected and published as Great American Universities (1910), Major Prophets of Today (1914) and Six Major Prophets (1916).

His many articles for The Independent about scientific topics won him a reputation as a leading popularizer of science. His book Creative Chemistry, published in 1919, was a collection of articles about industrial applications of chemistry. It was his most successful publication and became a bestseller, with 200,000 copies sold by 1929. It was still being used in high school and college chemistry courses in the early 1940s. In 1920 he published another collection, Easy Lessons in Einstein, explaining the theory of relativity to a non-scientific audience. From 1912 to 1920 he taught a course on physical science for journalists at the Pulitzer School of Journalism.

== Science Service ==
In 1920, the biologist William Emerson Ritter invited Slosson to become the first head of Science Service, which was being organized by Ritter and the newspaper publisher E.W. Scripps with the aim of improving the general public's understanding of science by providing scientific news to daily newspapers. Slosson accepted Ritter's job offer, and in January 1921 he moved to Washington, D.C., where Science Service's offices were located in the National Research Council building.

Slosson, whose official title at Science Service was Editor, was responsible for organizing and staffing the agency. His initial efforts were concentrated on promoting and developing science journalism by the means of a weekly syndicated news service called Science News Bulletin. Slosson described Science Service as "a sort of liaison officer between scientific circles and the outside world".Science News Bulletin was well received and in September 1922 it began to be issued to newspapers and magazines daily rather than weekly. Also in 1922, Science Service started publishing Science News Letter, a weekly magazine for sale to individuals.

Watson Davis, an engineer at the National Bureau of Standards and part-time science journalist who had been submitting articles to Science News Bulletin since it was established, became managing editor of Science Service in January 1923. Davis's assistance and the growing success of the agency allowed Slosson to devote more of his time to writing, lecturing and travelling. He contributed many articles to Science News Letter and other magazines including Collier's Weekly, and published five more books during the last decade of his life. He made his first radio broadcast at a meeting of the American Chemical Society in 1924, and in June of that year Science Service collaborated with the National Research Council to establish a weekly series called Science News of the Week. These radio broadcasts featured scientists talking about their work. Slosson also travelled extensively as a news correspondent for Science Service, in 1923 joining an expedition by astronomers to Mount Wilson Observatory in California to observe a solar eclipse.

When Slosson died of heart disease on October 15, 1929, in Washington, he was "easily the outstanding interpreter of sciences to the non-technical public", according to the Dictionary of American Biography.

== Books written ==
- Great American Universities. New York: Macmillan. 1910. Fulltext at The Internet Archive
- Major Prophets of Today. Boston: Little, Brown & Co. 1914. Fulltext at The Internet Archive
- Six Major Prophets. Boston: Little, Brown & Co. 1917. Fulltext at The Internet Archive
- Creative Chemistry. New York: The Century Co. 1919. Fulltext at The Internet Archive
- Easy Lessons in Einstein. New York: Harcourt, Brace and Howe. 1920. Fulltext at The Internet Archive
- The American Spirit in Education: A chronicle of great teachers. New Haven, CT: Yale University Press. 1921. Fulltext at The Internet Archive
- Plots and Personalities. New York: The Century Co. 1922. Fulltext at The Internet Archive
- Chats on Science. New York: The Century Co. 1924.
- Sermons of a Chemist. New York: Harcourt, Brace & Co. 1925.
- Snapshots of Science. New York: The Century Co. 1928.
- Short Talks on Science. New York: The Century Co. 1930.
- A Number of Things. New York: Harcourt, Brace & Co. 1930.
