= Simprints =

Nonprofit technology company

- Company type: Nonprofit
- Industry: Technology
- Founder: Alexandra Grigore; Toby Norman; Daniel Storisteanu; Tristram Norman
- Headquarters: University of Cambridge
- Products: Biometric identification tools
- Website: www.simprints.com

Simprints is a nonprofit technology company originating at the University of Cambridge. The company builds biometric identification tools and contactless face scanning solutions to be used by governments, NGOs, and nonprofit organisations serving people in low- and middle-income countries who lack proof of legal identity. The company promotes a portable fingerprint and face biometric system designed for front-line workers delivering at the last mile. The technology uses Bluetooth to connect to an Android mobile device that is interoperable with existing mHealth systems such as CommCare, ODK, or DHIS2.

== History ==
Simprints emerged in May 2012 out of a hackathon organised by the Centre for Global Equality and sponsored by technology company Arm. The founders of Simprints include Gates-Cambridge scholars Alexandra Grigore, Toby Norman, and Daniel Storisteanu as well as Royal Holloway-University of London student Tristram Norman.

In 2014, the firm received a Round 4 Saving Lives at Birth Seed Grant, part of a Grand Challenges competition supported by the US Agency for International Development (USAID), the Government of Norway, the Bill & Melinda Gates Foundation, Grand Challenges Canada (funded by the Government of Canada), and the UK’s Department for International Development (DFID). This funding was partially matched by Arm ltd, a Cambridge based semiconductor and software company. This provided for a pilot study in partnership with BRAC and the Johns Hopkins Global mHealth Initiative to test the system with health workers in Gaibandha, Bangladesh.

In 2015, Simprints received another grant from Innovate UK (formerly the Technology Strategy Board) to move prototypes to the pre-production phase and develop and verify all software. This enabled the firm to launch a pilot project with BRAC which later manifested in a formal partnership.

In 2016, Simprints developed their first production-ready biometric scanner known as Vero. It is IP65 rated and CE/FCC certified.

In 2016, Simprints won a $200,000 grant from the Global Innovation Fund.

In 2017, the firm won a Round 7 Saving Lives at Birth Transition to Scale grant for $2 million to scale up Simprints partnership with BRAC’s maternal health program to reach 2 million expectant mothers and children in Bangladesh.

In 2019, Simprints announced that 3000 units of the Vero 2.0 would be shipped in early 2020

In April 2022, Simprints enrolled over 2 million people with its biometric technology.

At the end of 2023, Simprints made its Android application available on GitHub, making it one of the world’s first fully open-source biometric ID solutions for last-mile delivery with advanced privacy engineering.

== Published Literature ==
In October 2023, Simprints was featured in a Harvard Business School Case Study entitled ‘Toby Norman: Is passion enough for Simprints to thrive?’. The case, written by Professor Jon Jachimowicz, is an in-depth look at the Simprints story and has become part of the core curriculum for all first-year Business students in the LEAD programme at Harvard.

In May 2023, Simprints launched the ‘Responsible Biometric Deployment Handbook’, funded by IBM. The project was supported with a grant from the Notre Dame-IBM Technology Ethics Lab, the applied arm of the Notre Dame Technology Ethics Center. The guide provides tools to explore the ethical and secure adoption of biometric technology in frontline humanitarian and development settings.

== Awards and Recognitions ==
Year	Award	Subject	Outcome	Ref
2014	Saving Lives at Birth Grand Challenge	Simprints	Won	
2015	UNICEF + TechCrunch Award for ‘Best Tech: Changing Children’s Lives for Good’	Simprints	Won	
2015	Business Weekly Awards Startup Company of the Year	Simprints	Won	
2016	Forbes 30 Under 30 Entrepreneur List	Toby Norman (CEO)	Won	
2016	Forbes 30 Under 30 Entrepreneur List	Tristram Norman	Won	
2016	Forbes 30 Under 30 Entrepreneur List	Dan Storisteanu	Won	
2016	$200,000 grant from the Global Innovation Fund	Simprints	Won	
2017	Core77 Design for Social Impact Award	Simprints and Smart Design	Won	
2017	Schwab Social Entrepreneur of the Year	Toby Norman (CEO)	Won	
2017	Round 7 Saving Lives at Birth Transition to Scale Grant	Simprints	Won	
2018	GLG Social Entrepreneur Fellowship	Toby Norman (CEO)	Won	
2018	Gavi, the Vaccine Alliance INFUSE ‘Pacesetter’	Simprints	Won	
2019	The World Bank’s Mission Billion Challenge - Top Prize	Simprints	Won	
2020	Elevate Prize Foundation Award	Alexandra Grigore (CPO)	Won	
2020	MIT Solve 'Health Security and Pandemics' Challenge for 'Biometrics for Vaccine Delivery'	Simprints	Won	
2020	FT/IFC Transformational Business Award: ‘Transformational Solutions in Health, Wellness and Disease Prevention’	Simprints	Won	
2020	COVIDaction Data Challenge Award	Simprints	Won	
2020	10 Best Workplaces in Tech (Small)	Simprints	Won	
2020	24 Best Workplaces (Small)	Simprints	Won	
2021	Innovations in Healthcare ‘Innovator Network’	Simprints	Won	
2021	Great Place to Work 2021	Simprints	Won	
2022	World Food Programme Digital Health Innovation Accelerator	Simprints	Won	
2022	Great Place to Work 2022	Simprints	Won	
2022	60 Best Workplaces for Women	Simprints	Won	
2023	Great Place to Work Certified Company	Simprints	Won	
2023	Flexa Pioneer Award	Tara Clarkson, Simprints Chief of People & Culture	Won	
2023	Top organisations to escape to list by Escape the City	Simprints	Won	
2024	Flexa Certified Flexible Company	Simprints	Won	
2024	2024 Responsible Tech Organisations List	Simprints	Won	
2024	Top 100 Global Most Loved Workplaces by Newsweek	Simprints	Won	
2024	Top Most Loved Workplaces® for Young Professionals	Simprints	Won	
2024	UK's Best Workplaces for Women	Simprints	Won	
2024	UK's Best Workplaces for Wellbeing	Simprints	Won	
2025	Gates Cambridge Impact Prize	Alexandra Grigore, Simprints' Chief Strategy Officer	Won	
2025	Gates Foundation 2025 UK Goalkeeper	Toby Norman, Simprints' Chief Executive Officer	Won	
2025	SDG Programme of the Year at the Development 2030 Awards	Operation Sight, Simprints	Won	

== Affiliations ==
As of January 2023, Simprints' partners and financial supporters include:

- Arm
- Autodesk
- Balsamiq
- Basecamp
- Bill & Melinda Gates Foundation
- BRAC
- Brown University
- Children's Investment Fund Foundation
- Cisco
- COHESU
- CommCare
- D-Tree
- Draper Richards Kaplan Foundation
- Duke University
- Elevate Foundation
- Foundation Botnar
- Gavi, the Vaccine Alliance
- Gerson Lehrman Group
- Ghana Health Service
- GitHub
- GIZ
- Global Innovation Fund
- Google
- Innovations in Healthcare
- Impact Network
- Innovate UK
- International Committee of the Red Cross
- JetBrains
- John Snow, Inc
- Kemp Little
- Khushi Baby
- London School of Hygiene and Tropical Medicine
- Microsoft
- Ministry of Health of Ethiopia
- Bangladesh Ministry of Health and Family Welfare
- MIT Solve
- MobiKlinic
- Notre Dame-IBM Technology Ethics Lab
- ODK
- Orbis International
- Pfizer Foundation
- Salesforce
- Slack
- Smart Design
- Terra Firma
- Steele Foundation for Hope
- Trinity College, Cambridge
- UK aid
- United States Agency for International Development
- University of North Carolina at Chapel Hill
- University of Sydney
- World Bank
- World Food Program
- Engineering for Change
- Saving Lives at Birth
