= Things of Science =

Things of Science was an educational program launched by the nonprofit news syndicate Science Service in November 1940. The program consisted of a series of kits available by subscription and sent by mail monthly. The program continued until 1989. As of 2018, there is no mention of the program or its archives on the website of the Society for Science & the Public, which succeeded the old Science Service organization.

Each month, thousands of subscribers received a small blue box about the size of a videocassette containing some material such as nylon thread or dinosaur bones. The box contained a yellow booklet explaining the topic for that month, along with the pieces and supplies needed to cover the topic. Some kits would teach about a specific topic, such as coal, static electricity, mechanical linkages, nonwoven fabrics, electroplating, or optical illusions. Other kits would provide parts to build items such as a small spectrograph, telescope, or pinhole camera. In addition to the monthly subscription, some kits were available for individual purchase, such as a "soilless gardening" unit which provided seeds, plant food, and instructions in hydroponics. Some kits contained basic materials for simple experiments in psychology.

The modest annual subscription price ($5 in the 1960s) covered the cost of printing and postage. The instructions were written by Science Service staff, and the kit materials were donated by various companies.

The Things of Science Club was started by Watson Davis, editor-in-chief of Science Service, because editors served by the service often asked for samples of the things the syndicate wrote about. The initial focus of the program was newspaper editors, but it soon shifted to young people. By 1946 the Science Service estimated that half of its subscribers were school groups and science clubs, and the other half were individuals. Membership in the club was limited to a few thousand because some of the "things", such as dinosaur bones, were hard to come by.
