= Kavita Ramdas =

Indian/American activist

Kavita Nandini Ramdas
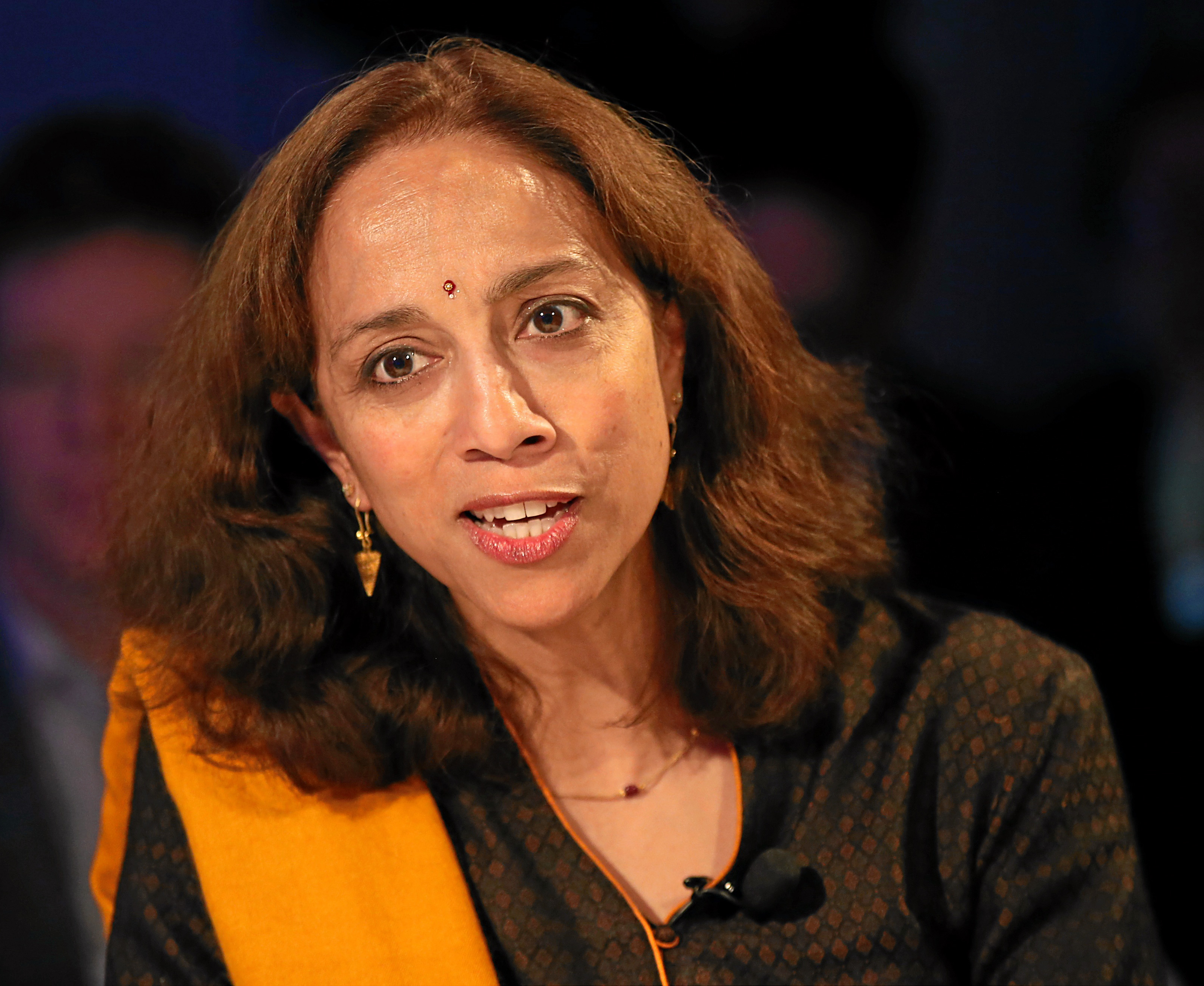
- Ramdas at the World Economic Forum Annual Meeting in 2013
- Born: 1963 (age 62–63); Delhi, India
- Education: Princeton University (MPA '88); Mount Holyoke College (BA '85)
- Occupations: former President and CEO of the Global Fund for Women

Kavita Nandini Ramdas (born 1963) is an American feminist and activist.

Previously, she was the director of the Open Society Foundations’ Women's Rights Program and the senior advisor to the Ford Foundation's president, Darren Walker. She assumed the position in 2015 after serving for 3 years as Ford's India country representative, representing the office in India, Nepal, and Sri Lanka. Prior to that, she was executive director of the Program on Social Entrepreneurship at the Freeman Spogli Institute for International Studies at Stanford University. Kavita is best known for her contribution to feminist philanthropy as former president and CEO of the Global Fund for Women.

== Background and affiliations ==
Kavita Ramdas is the daughter of Lalita Ramdas and Admiral Laxminarayan Ramdas, former Head of the Indian Navy.

Kavita Ramdas was born in Delhi, India and grew up in Mumbai, Delhi, London, Rangoon, and Bonn. She attended high school at the Nikolaus Cusanus Gymnasium in Bad Godesberg, Bonn, Germany; the Cathedral and John Connon School, Mumbai, and graduated from Springdales School, New Delhi, in 1980. She studied political science at Hindu College, University of Delhi for two years until 1982. In 1983, she was awarded a scholarship to Mount Holyoke College, South Hadley, Massachusetts, where she received her B.A. in international relations in 1985 and her M.P.A. in international development and public policy studies from the Woodrow Wilson School of Public and International Affairs at Princeton University in 1988.

In 1990, Ramdas married Zulfiqar Ahmad, a peace advocate, whom she had met in college. Zulfiqar is the nephew of the Pakistani academic and anti-war activist, Eqbal Ahmed, one of the Harrisburg Seven. Given her father's stature as a senior naval officer, there was speculation that their relationship could compromise India's national security.

Ramdas is a former member of the Global Development Program Advisory Panel to the Bill & Melinda Gates Foundation, and serves on the Board of Trustees at Princeton University, on the Council of Advisors on Gender Equity to the Woodrow Wilson School at Princeton University, and on the Advisory Council to the Asian University for Women and the African Women Millennium Initiative on Poverty and Human Rights. She is a member of the Henry Crown Fellow's Program of the Aspen Institute and previously served as a board member for the Women's Funding Network.

== Work at the Global Fund for Women ==
Kavita Ramdas was the President and CEO of the Global Fund for Women from 1996 until 2010. During Ramdas’ tenure, the Global Fund for Women assets grew from $6 million to $21 million. Grantmaking increased to $8 million per year, and the number of countries in which the Global Fund for Women made grants nearly tripled to over 160 countries. Ramdas also oversaw the Global Fund for Women's first endowment campaign and the creation of the Now or Never Fund to ensure women's participation on critical international issues.

Ramdas also served in advisory and/or management roles at MADRE, the John D. and Catherine T. MacArthur Foundation, the Ford Foundation, and the Stanford University Program on Social Entrepreneurship.

In 2018, Ramdas was named director of Women's Rights Programs for the Open Society Foundations.

== Honors and awards ==
- California Institute of Integral Studies, Haridas and Bina Chaudhuri Award for Distinguished Service, 2009
- Duveneck Humanitarian Award, 2008
- Social Capitalist Award, Fast Company (magazine), 2007
- Women of Great Esteem Award, 2007
- Girl's Hero Award, Girls' Middle School, 2007
- Woman of Substance Award, African Women's Development Fund, 2005
- Juliette Gordon Low Award, Girl Scouts of the USA, 2005
- Woman of the Year for the Public Sector, Financial Women's Association, 2004
- Leadership for Equity & Diversity (LEAD) Award, Women & Philanthropy, 2004
- Bay Area Local Hero, KQED-FM Radio, 2004
- 21 Leaders for the 21st Century Award, Women's eNews, 2003

== See also ==
- List of Indian Americans
