= Anne Firth Murray =

New Zealand activist and writer

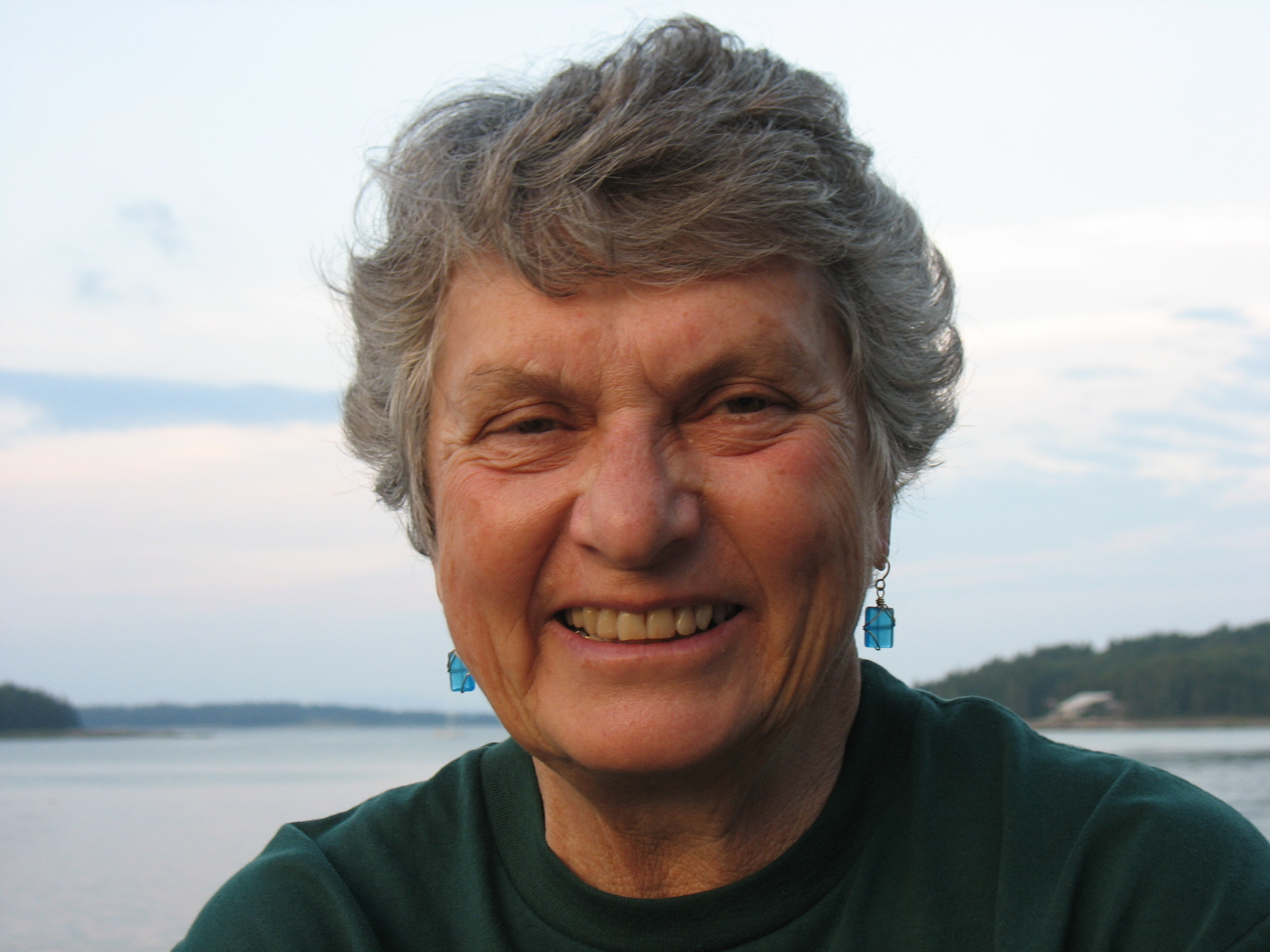
- Born: June 23, 1935 (age 91); Whanganui, New Zealand
- Education: New York University, University of California
- Occupations: Activist, Author, Teacher, Nonprofit Founder

Anne Firth Murray (born June 23, 1935 in Whanganui, New Zealand) is an activist, author, teacher at Stanford University, and nonprofit founder. Murray is the founding president of the Global Fund for Women, which raises and gives away money to groups around the world supporting women's human rights. She founded the organization in 1987 and continued to act as president until 1996.

She previously led philanthropic efforts on population and environmental issues for the William and Flora Hewlett Foundation from 1978 to 1987. Prior to that, she was a writer at the United Nations and an editor at the Stanford, Oxford, and Yale university presses.

Murray has been teaching on international women's health and human rights at Stanford University since 2001. Since 2010 she has also taught a course on "love as a force for social justice." She is a board member and/or advisor to several organizations, including CIVICUS, Grass Roots Alliance for Community Education (GRACE), Initiative for Equality (IfE), and No Means No Worldwide (NMNW). In 2005, she was one of a thousand women jointly nominated for the Nobel Peace Prize.

In 2022 she was awarded the Society of Woman Geographers Outstanding Achievement Award.

Murray is the author of two books: Paradigm Found: Leading and Managing for Positive Change and From Outrage to Courage: The Unjust and Unhealthy Situation of Women in Poorer Countries and What They Are Doing About It.

== Bibliography ==
- From Outrage to Courage: The Unjust and Unhealthy Situation of Women in Poorer Countries and What They Are Doing About It. (2013: 2nd edition)
- Paradigm Found: Leading and Managing for Positive Change (2006)
