= Summer Edward =

Trinidadian American writer (born 1986)

- Born: 10 March 1986 (age 40); San Fernando, Trinidad
- Education: Temple University, University of Pennsylvania
- Occupations: Writer, children's editor

Summer Edward (born 10 March 1986) is a Trinidadian American writer, children's book editor, educator, children's book specialist, and Caribbean children's literature advocate based in the USA. In 2010, at the age of 24, she founded Anansesem ezine, the first publication devoted to coverage of English-language Caribbean children's literature and served as its editor-in-chief for 10 years. At 26, she became one of the Caribbean's youngest literary editors. Anansesem has published some of the most distinctive and distinguished voices in Caribbean literature for young people including Floella Benjamin, Gerald Hausman, Ibi Zoboi, Itah Sadu, Lynn Joseph, Margarita Engle, Nadia L. Hohn, Olive Senior and Vashanti Rahaman.

== Education ==
Summer Edward earned a bachelor of arts degree in psychology at Temple University, where she organized the College of Liberal Arts' World Voices Poetry Festival and received the Jane D. Mackler Baccalaureate Award for academic achievement. She holds a Master of Education degree in reading, writing, literacy from the University of Pennsylvania. She remained a straight-A student throughout her university career and is a lifelong Roothbert Fellow and a lifelong Phi Beta Kappa member.

== Career ==
Edward worked at Houghton Mifflin Harcourt as an associate editor, developing and editing children's fiction books for the Heinemann division. She also worked at NoveList, a division of EBSCO Information Services, where she specialized in creating readers' advisory resources for children and teens. For several years, she taught writing and communications courses at the University of the West Indies at St. Augustine. From August 2023 to July 2024, Edward temporarily (as maternity leave cover) took on the duties of the managing editor of The Horn Book Magazine. She has continued as consulting editor at The Horn Book and is also an adjunct professor of children's literature at the Community College of Vermont.

== Literary activism ==
Edward has worked for diversity in children's publishing and for the advancement of Caribbean children's literature. She has been a judge and editor for writing competitions, including the Golden Baobab Prizes for African children's literature, the Scholastic Art & Writing Awards, the CODE Burt Awards, and OpenIDEO's Early Childhood Book Challenge. Her writings on multicultural children's literature appear in School Library Journal, The Horn Book Magazine, WOW Stories: Connections from the Classroom, sx salon, Charlotte Huck's Children’s Literature: A Brief Guide, The Millions, NoveList (EBSCOhost), on the Social Justice Books website, on the International Literacy Association's website, and on the KidLit TV website.

== Bibliography ==
=== Books for young readers ===
- The Wonder of the World Leaf (HarperCollins UK, 2021)
- Renaissance Man: Geoffrey Holder's Life in the Arts (Heinemann USA, 2021)
- Grannie's Coal Pot (Heinemann USA, 2021)
- The Breadfruit Bonanza (Heinemann USA, 2021)
- First Class: How Elizabeth Lange Built a School (Heinemann USA, 2021)
- Zarah and the Zemi (Heinemann USA, 2021)

=== Anthologies ===
- Tengo Sed: An Anthology of Works Celebrating Black Voices, Identities, and Personhood (University of Illinois Press, 2026)
- Caribbean Children's Literature, Volume 2: Critical Approaches (University Press of Mississippi, 2023)
- Bookmarked: New Caribbean Writing (PREE ink, 2021)
- 1789: Twelve Authors Explore a Year of Rebellion, Revolution and Change, edited by Marc Aronson and Susan Campbell Bartoletti (Candlewick Press, 2020)
- New Daughters of Africa: An International Anthology of Writing by Women of African Descent, edited by Margaret Busby (Amistad/HarperCollins, 2019)
- New Worlds, Old Ways: Speculative Tales from the Caribbean, edited by Karen Lord (Peepal Tree Press/Peekash Press, 2016)
- Whaleheart: Journey into the Night with Maya Christina Gonzalez and 23 Courageous ArtistAuthors (Reflection Press, 2015)
