= The Golden Baobab Prize =

African literary award

Golden Baobab
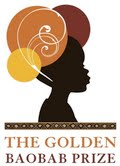
- Founded: 2008
- Founders: Deborah Ahenkorah; Rama Shagaya
- Type: Non-profit organization
- Purpose: Children's literature, writing, illustration
- Region served: Africa
- Website: www.thegoldenbaobab.org

The Golden Baobab Prize (formerly The Baobab Prize) is awarded annually to African writers of children's literature and young adult literature. The Golden Baobab Prize accepts entries of unpublished short stories written by African citizens irrespective of age, race or geographical location. The prize is awarded annually to African citizens who submit a short story geared toward children and/or young adults in one of three categories: Junior Category (stories for readers aged 8–11 years), Senior Category (stories for readers aged 12–15 years) and a Rising Writer prize for a promising writer aged 18 years and under. Entry into the prize is by email, submitted stories should be unpublished works in English. Established in July 2008, the Golden Baobab Prize is an African literary award that aims to encourage the writing of African literature for children and young adults. Its mission is to identify African literary giants of the next generation and produce classic African stories that will be appreciated for years to come.

The Golden Baobab Prize is an initiative of The Golden Baobab Foundation for Education, a nonprofit organization registered in Ghana. The prize is supported by the African Library Project, Playing for Change, Echoing Green, and The Global Fund for Children. The organization operates from its office in Accra, Ghana, led by co-founder Deborah Ahenkorah. In 2009, the inaugural 2008 winners were awarded $800 each, this was increased to $1000 for the 2009/2010 awards in the Junior and Senior categories.

== The Golden Baobab Prize winners ==
2008/2009

- Junior Category: Lauri Kubuitsile - Lorato and her Wire Car (Botswana)
- Senior Category: Ivor W. Hartmann - Mr. Goop (Zimbabwe)
- Rising Writer: Aisha Kibwana - Strange Visitors that took her life away (Kenya)

2009/2010

- Junior Category: Mirirai Moyo - Diki, the Little Earthworm (Zimbabwe)
- Senior Category: Lauri Kubuitsile - Mechanic’s Son (Botswana)
- Rising Writer: Aisha Kibwana - Strange Visitors that took her life away (Kenya)

2010/2011

- Junior Category: Edyth Bulbring - Sour Worms (South Africa)
- Senior Category: Ken Farnsworth - The Rooster (South Africa)
- Rising Writer: Luc Haasbroek - The Dance (South Africa)

2014

- Portia Dery became the first Ghanaian to win with her story "Grandma's list" for picture book prize.

== The Golden Baobab Prize judges ==
- 2009: Nii Ayikwei Parkes, Kathy Knowles, and Professor Osayimwense Osa.
- 2010: Jay Heale, Nana Ayebia Clarke, Muthoni Garland, Bibi Bakare-Yusuf, Cynthia Pon, and Meshack Asare.
- 2011: Brenda Randolph, Helon Habila, Elinor Sisulu, Meshack Asare, Carol Mitchell, and Tanja Galetti.
- 2012: Yohannes Gebregeorgis, Vivian Yenika-Agbaw, Carol Broomhall, Atinuke Akinyemi Sears, Kopano Matwla, Tanja Galetti.
- 2013: Esi Sutherland-Addy, Bernardine Evaristo, Osayimwense Osa, Nonikiwe Mashologu, Zetta Elliott, Annette Hansen.
- 2014: Nonikiwe Mashologu, Paul O. Zelinsky, Summer Edward, Kofi Anyimadu, Nancy Drost, Kanengo Diallo, Doreen Baingana, Akua Peprah, Kinna Likimani.
- 2016: Nonikiwe Mashologu, Rutendo Chabikwa, Kofi Anyimadu, Daphne Lee, Brenda Randolph, Lanre Shasore.
- 2018: Carol Williams, Kathy Knowles, Daphne Lee, Akoss Ofori-Mensah, Akua Peprah, Sarah Odedina.
