= Alexander Leitch, Baron Leitch =

British businessman and life peer (1947–2024)

The Right Honourable The Lord Leitch
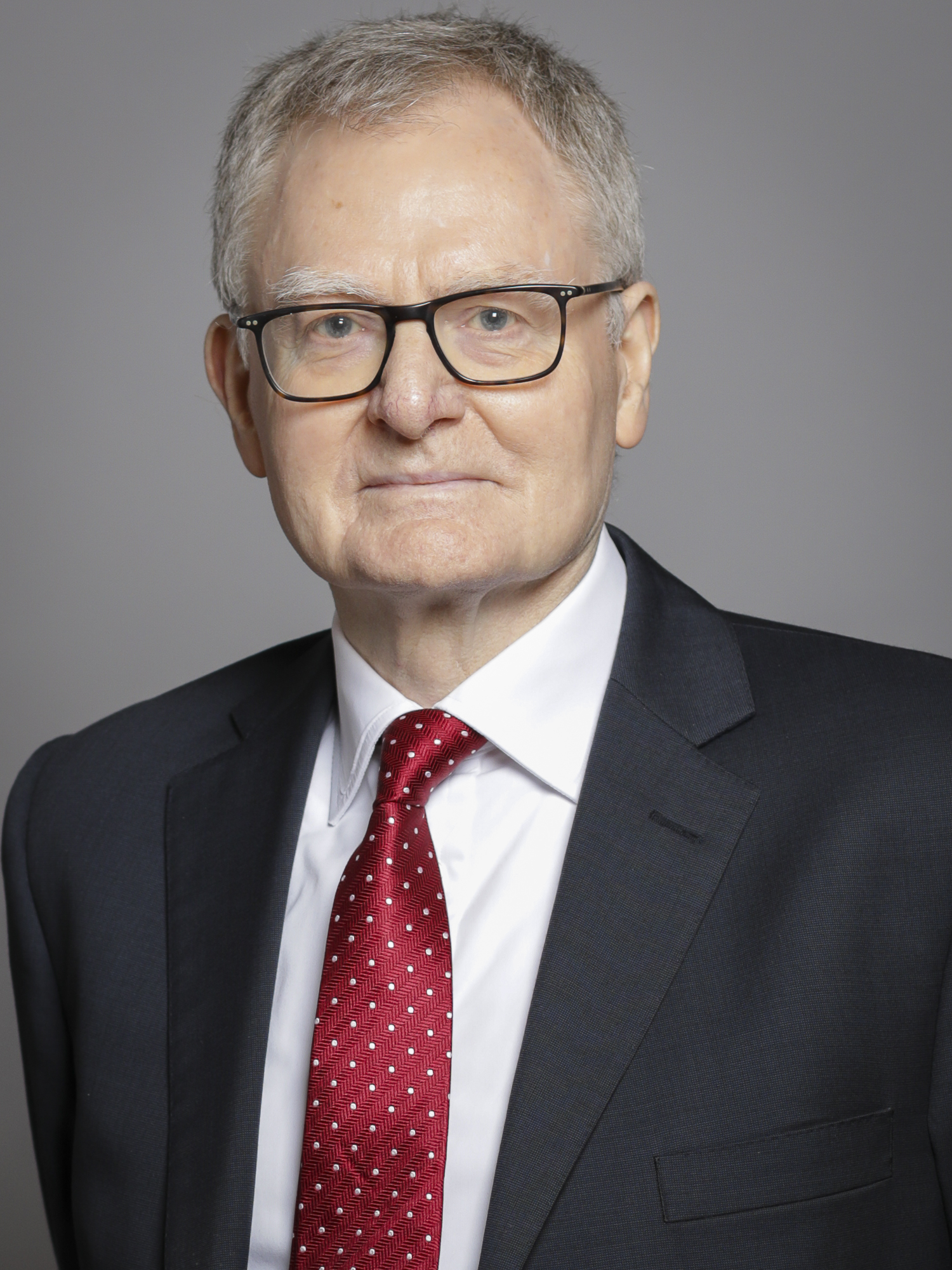
- Official portrait, 2019

Member of the House of Lords
- Lord Temporal
- Life peerage 7 June 2004 – 4 October 2024

Personal details
- Born: 20 October 1947 Blairhall, Fife, Scotland
- Died: 5 October 2024 (aged 76)
- Party: Labour
- Occupation: Peer and businessman

Alexander Park Leitch, Baron Leitch (20 October 1947 – 5 October 2024) was a British businessman who was Group Chairman of FNZ, a global wealth management technology platform. He was also a British Labour peer, sitting in the House of Lords from 2004 until his death.

== Biography ==
Leitch was born in Blairhall, Fife on 20 October 1947. He was educated at Dunfermline High School and was offered a place to read chemistry at university at just 16 years of age. However, he turned his place down and instead headed to London to work in the IT department of an insurance company.

In 1965, Sandy started his career as a computer programmer, writing the first ever UK life assurance ‘search engine’ program in 1967. He remained in the insurance industry throughout his early career, rising to become Chief Executive of Allied Dunbar, Executive Chair of Eagle Star and Threadneedle Asset Management before they were eventually merged with Zurich Financial Services in 1998. He was then appointed a Chief Executive of Zurich Financial Services. He retired in 2004.

Leitch became a life peer as Baron Leitch, of Oakley in Fife on 7 June 2004. Having demonstrated his commitment to public service as chair of the National Employment Panel for over six years.

He authored the Leitch Review of Skills which was published on 5 December 2006. The objective of the review was "to identify the UK's optimal skills mix for 2020 to maximise economic growth, productivity and social justice, set out the balance of responsibility for achieving that skills profile and consider the policy framework required to support it."

In 2017, he set up the 'What Is More?' Foundation, to encourage spiritual and multi-faith debate. He also became a patron of the Stroke Association and the Medical Aid Films Charity where he was formerly founding Chairman.

He supported initiatives promoting employee volunteering and workplace diversity. He was also involved with organizations working to address a range of social and community issues.

Lord Leitch was Deputy Chair of Business in the Community and received the Prince of Wales Ambassador award for charity work.

== Career ==
Leitch was Group Chairman at FNZ, the global wealth management technology platform which partners with over 800 financial institutions and 8,000 wealth management firms. He was appointed to this role in 2013, and saw the company’s market value grow from $200 million to $20 billion over his tenure.

Leitch was previously founder and Chairman of Intrinsic Financial Services. Additionally, he was chairman at Scottish Widows plc, deputy chairman at Lloyds Banking Group plc, and on the Board of Old Mutual Wealth. He was a Trustee of the Lloyds Banking Group Charitable Foundation.

He was Chancellor of Carnegie College, chairman of a new think tank called ‘The Centre for Modern Families’ and strategic adviser to a Prince of Wales charity called PRIME.

His other roles included:

- BUPA (2007-2018) - Chairman of BUPA, the global healthcare company.
- Lloyds Banking Group plc (2005–2012) – a board member with a variety of roles including Chairman of Scottish Widows plc, LBG Risk Oversight Committee Chair, LBG senior independent director and finally as LBG deputy chair.
- Paternoster UK Ltd (2006–2010) – non-executive director for four years before selling the company to Goldman Sachs.
- Chair and chief executive, Zurich Financial Services UK, Ireland, South Africa and Asia Pacific.
- Chair of the Association of British Insurers.
- United Business Media plc (2005–2007) – non-executive director and senior independent director.
- Medical Aid Films – Founding Chair of infant and maternal mortality charity.
- Trustee of National Galleries of Scotland.
- National Portrait Gallery of Scotland – chaired the raising of £17 million of funds to refurbish the gallery.
- Chair of Stonar School in Wiltshire.
- Trustee of the Philharmonia Orchestra.
- Deputy Chair of the Commonwealth Education Fund.

== Relationship with Gordon Brown ==
Leitch was described as a "confidante" of Gordon Brown, who once commented, "Many people who have not had the privilege of knowing Sandy and many people who may not even know his name, have led more fulfilled lives as a result of all he has done and achieved."

== Personal life and death ==
Leitch was first married to Valerie Hodson from 1969 until 1996 and his second marriage to Noelle Dowd, an American and Swiss citizen. He had three daughters Fiona, Jacqueline and Joanne from his first marriage, and a young daughter Kathleen and two sons from his second.

He was a keen follower of his local Scottish football team Dunfermline Athletic.

Leitch collected antiquarian books, Scottish art and antiques. He wrote and painted as an amateur. He continued to explore spirituality.

He was a Freeman of the City of London. He had an honorary doctorate in business administration and a fellowship from Carnegie College.

Leitch died from leukaemia on 5 October 2024, at the age of 76.
