= Canton Network =

Blockchain network

The Canton Network is a public blockchain network developed for financial institutions to enable secure, interoperable, and privacy‑preserving transactions. Launched in 2023 by a consortium of banks, exchanges, and technology firms including BNP Paribas, Capgemini, CBOE, Deloitte, Deutsche Börse, Digital Asset, Goldman Sachs, Microsoft, Moody's, and Paxos the network aims to connect disparate financial systems while meeting regulatory and privacy requirements.

== History ==
Canton Network was announced in May 2023 by a consortium of companies as part of an effort to modernize post‑trade processes in global financial markets. Its launch involved over 30 major institutions, including banks such as Goldman Sachs and BNP Paribas, market infrastructure providers like Deutsche Börse, and technology partners including Microsoft and Deloitte. According to Bloomberg, multiple banks and financial institutions including Goldman Sachs, BNY Mellon, and CBOE concluded testing of the Canton Network in March 2024. In October 2024, 27 market participants including Euroclear, World Gold Council, and Clifford Chance completed a pilot to tokenise gilts, eurobonds, and gold on the Canton Network. In November 2024 Hydra X, a crypto custodian regulated by the Monetary Authority of Singapore, became the first APAC custodian to provide custody for Canton Coin.

== Technology ==
Canton is designed as a "network of networks," where each participating institution maintains its own ledger while connecting with others via a shared synchronization layer. This architecture enables atomic transactions, ensuring that complex, multi‑party exchanges either complete fully or not at all, while preserving the privacy of sensitive financial data. The network utilizes Digital Asset's Daml smart contract language and implements cryptographic measures to restrict transaction visibility only to the parties involved. Analyses by the Hong Kong Monetary Authority have suggested that this approach addresses the privacy and regulatory challenges faced by financial institutions using public blockchains.

The Canton Network is governed by the Canton Foundation (previously "Global Synchronizer Foundation"), an independent, non‑profit body established in July 2024 under the Linux Foundation, though the Canton Foundation is no longer affiliated with the Linux Foundation as of December 2025. The CF/GSF oversees the network's core interoperability component—often referred to as the Global Synchronizer—and sets policies for protocol updates and node participation. The CF/GSF is designed to ensure that no single entity controls the network's infrastructure. Its founding members include a mix of banks, market utilities, and technology companies, which are intended to collaboratively manage and evolve the network.

The Canton Network's economic model is built around its native utility token, Canton Coin, which is used both for paying transaction fees and as a reward mechanism for network participants. Transaction fees—calculated per unit of bandwidth and set in U.S. dollars—are paid in Canton Coin, with these fees burned (i.e. removed from circulation). New coins are minted as rewards for infrastructure operators and application providers.
