= Society for Science =

American scientific nonprofit organization

- Founded: 1921
- Founder: Edward W. Scripps; William Emerson Ritter
- Type: 501(c)(3) Non-profit
- Tax ID no.: 53-0196483
- Location: Washington, D.C., U.S.
- Products: Science News; Science News Explores
- Key people: Maya Ajmera (President & CEO); Mary Sue Coleman (Chair of the Board)
- Revenue: $31.9 million (2021)
- Endowment: $101.3 million (2021)
- Employees: 100
- Website: www.societyforscience.org
- Formerly called: Science Service

Society for Science, formerly known as Science Service and later Society for Science and the Public, is a 501(c)(3) non-profit organization dedicated to the promotion of science, through its science education programs and publications, including Science News magazine and Science News Explores.

The organization is headquartered in the Dupont Circle neighborhood of Washington, D.C. Founded as Science Service in 1921, the Society for Science has been dedicated to expanding scientific literacy, access to STEM education and scientific research for more than 100 years. In pursuit of this goal, it publishes two magazines: Science News and Science News Explores (formerly Science News for Students), and manages student science fair events including the International Science and Engineering Fair, the Regeneron Science Talent Search (previously known as the Westinghouse Science Talent Search, the oldest and longest running science fair competition in the US), and the Thermo Fisher Scientific Junior Innovators Challenge (JIC) competition.

== History ==
=== 20th century ===
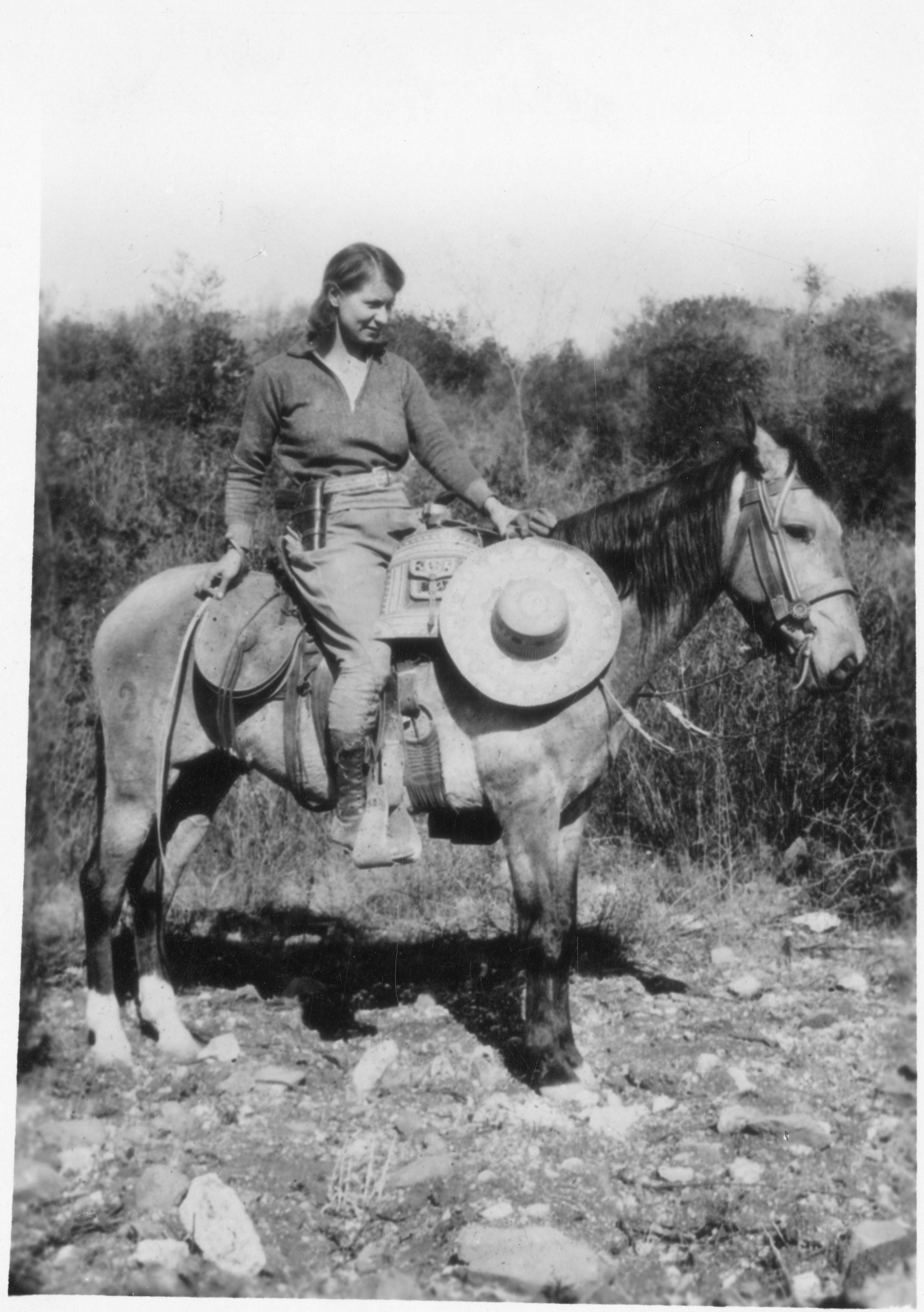
Emma Reh (1896–1982) was a science journalist for Science Service in the 1920s and 1930s. Here she is visiting an archaeological site in Oaxaca, Mexico.

Society for Science was founded in 1921 by journalist Edward W. Scripps and zoologist William Emerson Ritter, under the name "Science Service", with the goal of informing the public of the latest scientific discoveries and achievements. The Science Service emerged from a reorganization of a group that Scripps and Ritter had originally founded in 1919 as the American Society for the Dissemination of Science. Mr. Scripps a very successful journalist and Dr. Ritter formed a close working relationship, and both shared the belief the science the "most transformative agent" in society being one of the best fields for a stable society.

Dr. Ritter and Mr. Scripps believed that to make sure democracy would last and be safe from itself that there needed to be a well informed and intellectual population. Believing that science was could be applied to everyday life would be the way for protecting and keeping democracy safe. They believed that press would be the best way to educate the public and that every newspaper would have its own science writer. Science and journalism did not mesh well at first because scientists did not take the time to make sure journalist understood the science well enough to present the information, and journalists did not always make strides in understanding. The goal was to establish trust and make science in the news industry reliable and attenable to the public. Their goal was to educate about science in a positive and productive way, and felt that scientist were not doing a great job at helping the public understand their work. Researcher in the 20th century were cautious when it came to journalist, and Service Science would be the aid to help bridge the gap between the two groups.

Scripps and Ritter accomplished their goal by distributing the latest science research to the public through a news service for reporters. In 1922, due to interest from non-journalists, Science Service started distributing Science News-Letter, which became a magazine in 1926. It quickly became a prime source of science news for libraries, schools, and individuals. In 1942, Science Service launched the first of its prestigious education competitions, the Westinghouse Science Talent Search.

The popularization of science began to see its boom after WWI with many new scientific advancements. Many of the advancements "airplanes, radio, and the appreciation of sanitation and immunization, snatching of nitrogen from the air, the chemical revolution and a score of other scientific achievements." Between World War I and World War II, Science Service sponsored Science Clubs of America, founded by Watson Davis. It was a national organization to popularize science among amateur scientists. High school science clubs were encouraged to join.

Between 1930s and 1940s there was a boom in states starting Junior Academies, science clubs, and youth science education, and many organization that wanted to push science education. These academies, clubs, and general science education relied on the support of larger organization like Society for Science to aid in getting materials for educating the youth in the field of science. These organization used these clubs to seek out students who were talented in science and wanted to make sure they were getting educated well in the sciences. It also gave youth a place to present on science projects they were working on so they could display their knowledge, and would allow students to receive input from professionals. The focused tended to be on student work, seeing this as the reward itself. Some states did offer cash prizes, trinkets, certificates, trips, and honorary memberships into American Association for the Advancement of Science. There was an effort to add a real-world element and a well-rounded education experience where possible, like field trips to places like museums, universities, and industrial plants to see how sciences was being used in practical settings. From 1940 through 1989, Science Service sponsored the Things of Science Club. Subscribers received a monthly box containing some kind or material or artifact, along with a pamphlet describing experiments that could be done with it. Sometimes the kits contained parts that could be assembled into a scientific instrument.

=== 21st century ===
Beginning in 2003, it published Science News for Kids, an online magazine aimed at students, teachers and parents. This became Science News for Students. In 2022, with the publication of a new magazine of the same name, SNS was rebranded as Science News Explores.

In 2008, Science Service was renamed as the Society for Science & the Public, in order to better reflect the mission of the organization to advocate for science in the public interest.

In 2021, the organization announced it had shortened its name from Society for Science & the Public to Society for Science.

== See also ==
- Institute for Nonprofit News (member)

The Society for Science administers three science competitions:

- The Regeneron International Science and Engineering Fair for international high school students, previously sponsored by Intel.
- The Regeneron Science Talent Search for US high school seniors, previously sponsored by Westinghouse and Intel.
- The Thermo Fisher Scientific Junior Innovators Challenge for US middle school students, previously known as the Broadcom MASTERS
