= May Gorslin Preston Slosson =

American educator and suffragist (1858–1943)

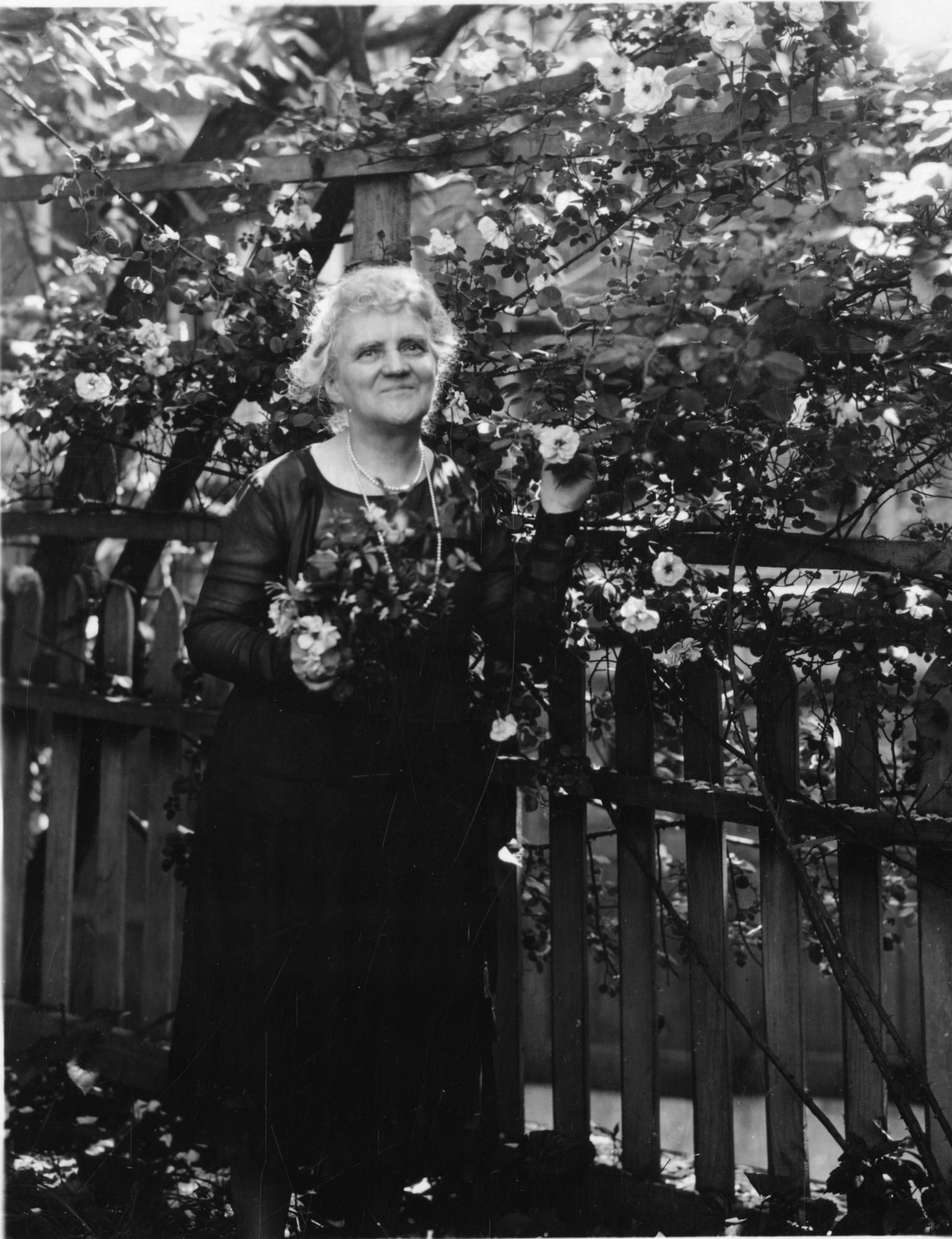
- Born: May Gorslin Preston; September 10, 1858; Ilion, New York, U.S.
- Died: November 26, 1943 (aged 85); Ann Arbor, Michigan, U.S.
- Education: Bachelor of Science (1878) and Master of Science (1879), from Hillsdale College; Ph.D. from Cornell University (1880)
- Occupations: Educator and suffragist
- Employer(s): Professor of Greek at Hastings College, Assistant Principal at Sabetha High School, Kansas, chaplain at Wyoming State Penitentiary
- Known for: First woman to earn a Ph.D. from Cornell University, and the first woman to obtain a doctoral degree in Philosophy in the United States.
- Spouse: Edwin Emery Slosson
- Children: 2
- Parent(s): Reverend Levi Campbell Preston, Mary Gorslin Preston

May Gorslin Preston Slosson (September 10, 1858 – November 26, 1943) was an American educator and suffragist. In 1880, she received a doctoral degree in philosophy from Cornell University, becoming the first woman in the United States to be awarded such a degree.

== Early life and education ==
May Gorslin Preston was the daughter of Reverend Levi Campbell Preston and the former Mary Gorslin. Her family moved to Kansas from New York State. She earned Bachelor of Science (1878) and Master of Science (1879) degrees from Hillsdale College in Michigan. In 1880, at age 22, she became the first woman to earn a Ph.D. from Cornell University, and the first woman to obtain a doctoral degree in Philosophy in the United States. Her 5,000 word thesis was entitled Different Theories of Beauty.

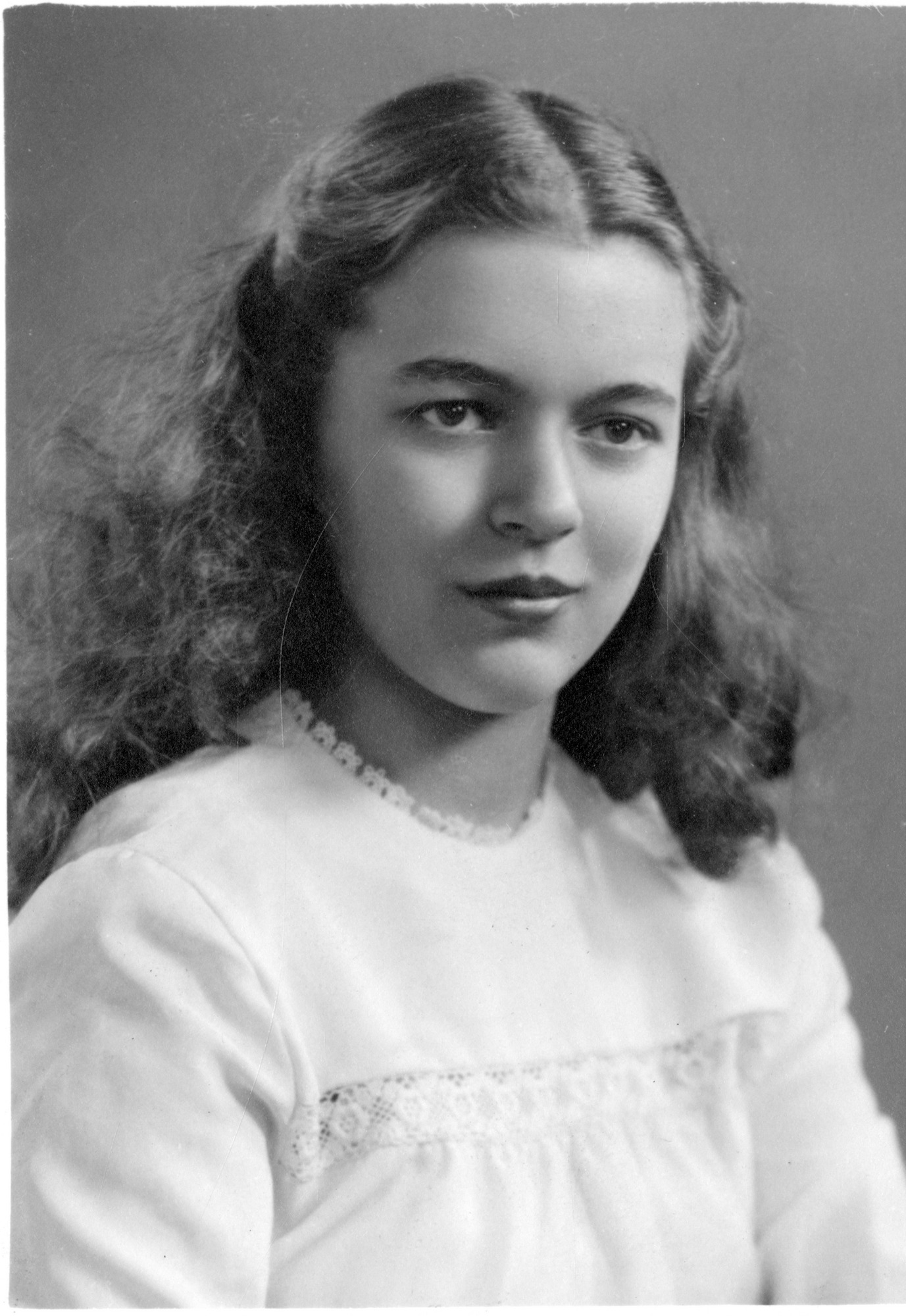
1945 photo of Flora May Slosson Wuellner, granddaughter of May Gorslin Preston Slosson

After obtaining her PhD she became a professor of Greek at Hastings College in Nebraska, and was later Assistant Principal at Sabetha High School in Kansas. She married Edwin Emery Slosson in 1891 in Centralia, Kansas and moved with him in 1892 to Laramie, Wyoming, where he had been appointed professor of Chemistry at the University of Wyoming. Their son Preston William Slosson, born in Laramie in 1892, went on to have a long career as professor of history at the University of Michigan. A younger son, Alfred Raymond, died in childhood of scarlet fever. Preston's daughter, Flora May Slosson attended the University of Michigan as well.

May Preston Slosson organized a series of Sunday afternoon lectures for the prisoners at the Wyoming State Penitentiary in Laramie, to be given by University of Wyoming professors. She was also a speaker in the series. When the position of chaplain at the nearly all-male prison became vacant in 1899, she was appointed to the position at the request of the inmates and became the first female prison chaplain in the U.S. Her work at the prison is commemorated by the Dr. May Preston Slosson Historical Lecture Series held at the Wyoming Territorial Prison State Historic Site. While employed, she insisted that the funds from her salary go towards purchasing books for the facility's library. She remained in the role until moving with her family to New York City in 1903.

While living in Wyoming, May Preston Slosson had enjoyed rights that other states denied to women, including the right to vote. After moving to New York, both she and her husband were active in the women's suffrage movement. After her husband's death, while living in Michigan with her son Preston, May Preston Slosson frequently attended the Bethel African Methodist Episcopal Church as well as the predominantly white Baptist church nearby. She was an active supporter of the Ann Arbor Dunbar Community Center while living in Michigan. In 1920 she published a book of poems, From a Quiet Garden, Lyrics in Prose and Verse.

== See also ==
- List of American suffragists
- List of women philosophers
