= Musimbi Kanyoro =

Kenyan activist

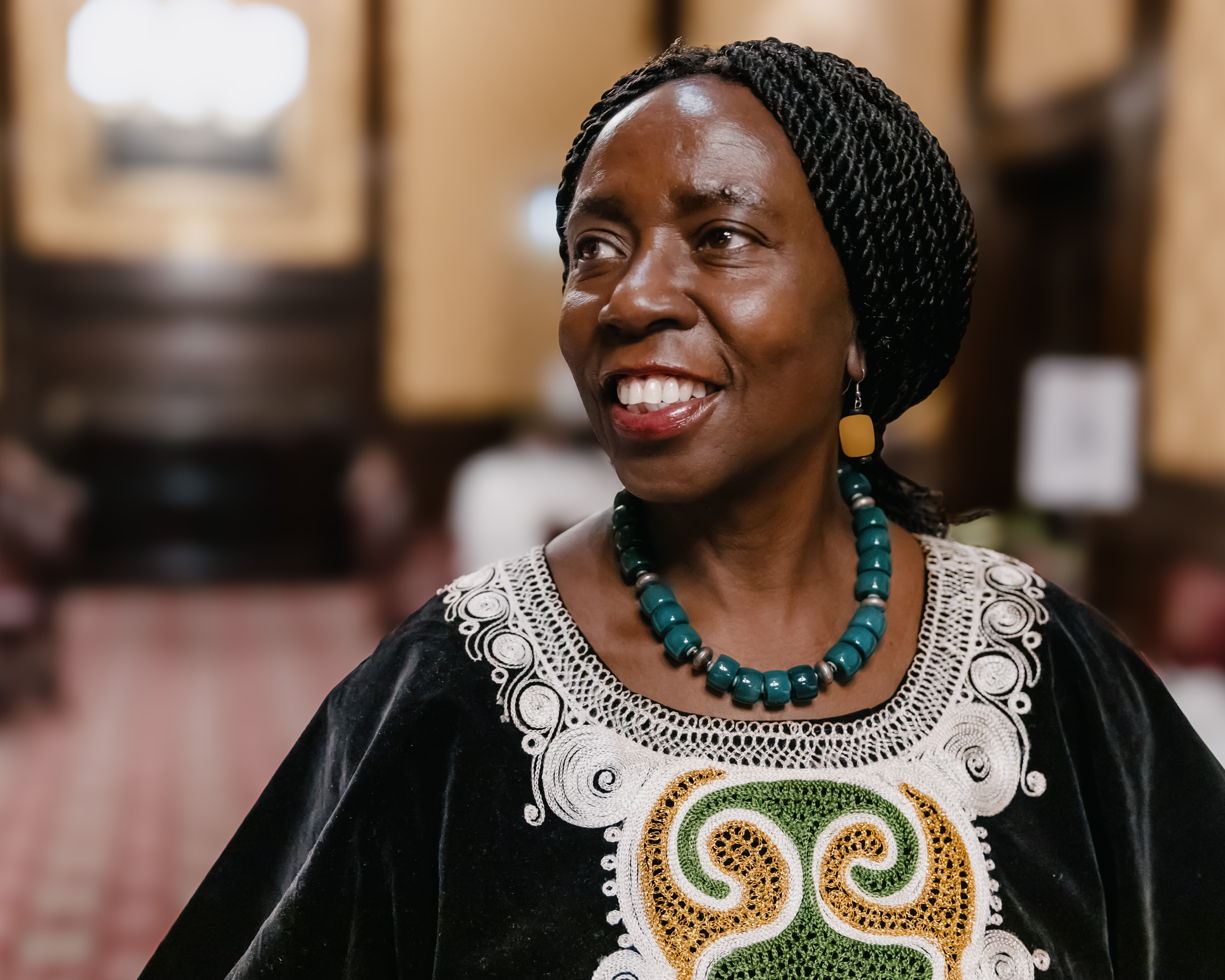
- Born: Migori County, Kenya
- Citizenship: Kenyan
- Education: University of Nairobi; University of Texas at Austin (PhD); San Francisco Theological Seminary
- Occupations: Human rights advocate; Philanthropist; Academic
- Employer(s): United World Colleges; London School of Economics
- Organizations: Global Fund for Women; World YWCA; Lutheran World Federation; United Bible Societies; CARE; Aspen Leaders Council
- Known for: Leadership in global women's rights and philanthropy
- Notable work: In Search of a Round Table: Gender, Theology and Church Leadership
- Title: Chairperson, International Board of United World Colleges
- Awards: Human Rights Award (1999); Wittenberg Award (2000)

Musimbi Kanyoro (born 30 November 1953)is a human rights advocate, philanthropist, and academic. She is the chairperson of the International Board of the United World Colleges and independent member at London School of Economics and Political Science. She is also the founding member of the Circle of Concerned African Women Theologians ("the Circle") and its first coordinator (1996-2002).

== Early life and education ==
Musimbi Kanyoro was born on 30th November 1953 in Migori County, Kenya, where she attended primary school before joining Alliance Girls School in Nairobi.

As a student in the 1970s, she supported the movement against apartheid in South Africa.

Kanyoro earned an undergraduate degree from the University of Nairobi and a PhD in Linguistics from the University of Texas at Austin. Kanyoro later earned a doctorate in feminist theology at the San Francisco Theological Seminary.

She was also a visiting scholar of Hebrew and the Old Testament at Harvard Divinity School.

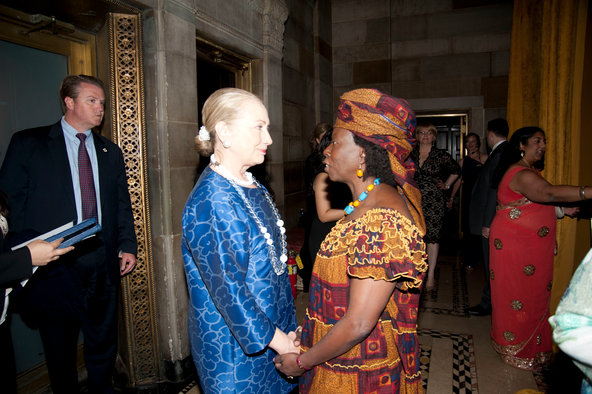
Hillary Rodham Clinton and Musimbi Kanyoro at the Global Fund For Women's Dinner in May 2013 in New York

== Career ==
Kanyoro with Ellen Johnson Sirleaf.

Kanyoro was the executive secretary, Desk for Women in Church and Society at the Lutheran World Federation from 1982 to 1997. She also edited the book In Search of a Round Table: Gender, Theology and Church Leadership, in 1998. She worked as a translation consultant for the United Bible Societies. From 1998 to 2007, Kanyoro became the first non-white General Secretary of the World YWCA.

Kanyoro was director of the Population and Reproductive Health Program of the David and Lucile Packard Foundation from 2007 to 2011. She was a member of the International Steering Committee for the Beijing World Conference and led delegations to five UN World Conferences in the 1990s. From 2018 until 2019, she served on an Independent Commission on Sexual Misconduct, Accountability and Culture Change at Oxfam, co-chaired by Zainab Bangura and Katherine Sierra. Musimbi Kanyoro was the president and CEO of Global Fund for Women from 2011 to 2019.

She has served in several boards, including the Aspen Leaders Council, the CARE Board, the UN High Level Taskforce for Reproductive Health, UN Women Civil Society Advisory Board, the U.S. President’s Emergency Plan for AIDS Relief (PEPFAR)’s Scientific Advisory Board and the International Board of the United World Colleges.

Kanyoro has worked with former president of Ireland Mary Robinson on several projects, including the Board of Directors of Realizing Rights: the Ethical Globalization Initiative. She served as a member of the Family Planning 2020 (FP2020) Reference Group.

She is also the member of Global Philanthropy Committee of the Council of Foundations.

Kanyoro also served as a member of the board of directors of the African Population and Health Research Centre, and was for seven years the chair of the board of ISIS Work. She also serves on the boards of CARE, Intra Health, CHANGE and Legacy Memory Bank, and is a member of the World Health Organization.

== Recognition and honours ==
- 1999 – Human Rights Award
- 1999 – Doctor of Divinity (honorary), Trinity Lutheran Seminary, (TLS) USA, for significant contribution to Christian Theology
- 2000 – The Wittenberg Award
- 2005 – designated a State Commendations of Kenya Moran of the Order of the Burning Spear (MBS)
- 2005 – Women of Substance Award
- 2005 – Global Leadership Award, World Vision and International AIDS Trust, USA
- 2005 – Nominee, 1000 Women for the Nobel Peace Prize,
- 2006 – Women, Leadership and Human Dignity Award
- 2008 – Inaugural address: Nelson Mandela Lecture Series at the University of South Australia
- 2011 – Changing the Face of Philanthropy
- 2012 – National Council for Research on Women 2012

== Selected bibliography ==
- Bofu-Tawamba, Ndana (2025). The uprising of women in philanthropy. Abingdon, Oxon; New York, NY: Routledge. ISBN 978-1-032-36146-8.
- Dube, Musa and Musimbi R.A. Kanyoro, eds. Grant me justice!: HIV/AIDS & gender readings of the Bible. Cluster Publications, 2004. ISBN 978-1570756009
- Kanyoro, Musimbi R.A. and Nyambura J. Njoroge, eds. Groaning in Faith: African women in the household of God. Nairobi: Acton Publishers. Papers From the Interfaith Circle of Concerned African Women Theologians, 1996. ISBN 978-9966888242
- Kanyoro, Musimbi R.A., ed. In search of a round table: gender, theology & church leadership. Geneva: WCC Publications, 1997. ISBN 2-8254-1209-0
- Kanyoro, Musimbi R.A. and Nyambura J. Njoroge, eds. A decade of solidarity with the Bible : decade festival : visions beyond 1998. Geneva: WCC Publications, 1998.
- Kanyoro, Musimbi R.A., Introducing Feminist Cultural Hermeneutics: An African Perspective. Cleveland: Pilgrim Press, 2002. ISBN 978-0829814996
- Kanyoro, Musimbi R.A., Forward to The alternative Luther : Lutheran theology from the subaltern, edited by Else Marie Wiberg Pedersen. Minneapolis: Fortress Academic, 2019.
- Oduyoye, Mercy Amba and Musimbi R.A. Kanyoro, eds. The Will to Arise: Women, Tradition, and the Church in Africa. Maryknoll, NY: Orbis Books, 2005. ISBN 978-1597524742.
