= Privacy Commissioner for Bermuda =

Independent public office of Bermuda

Office of the Privacy Commissioner for Bermuda
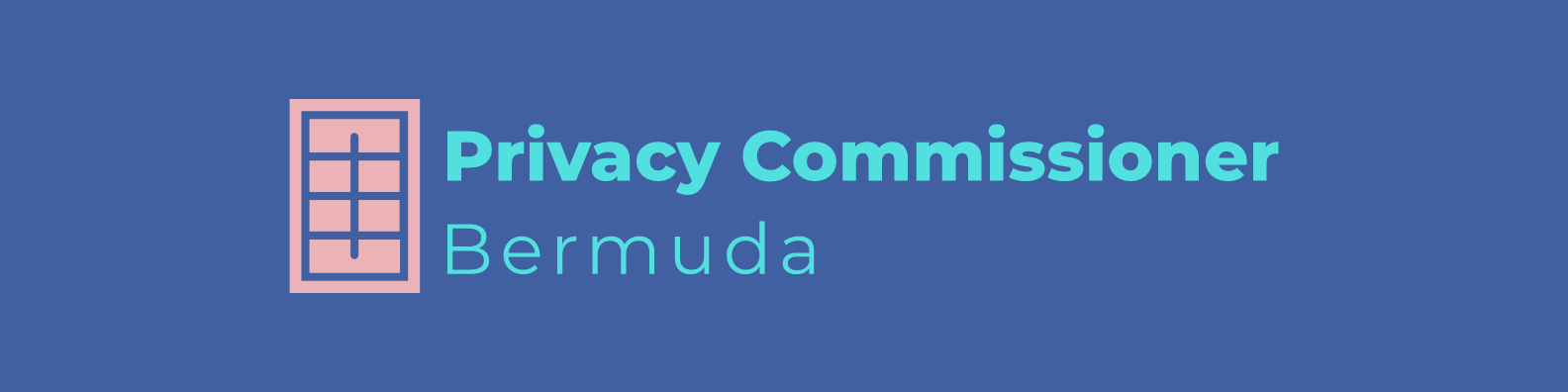

Office overview
- Formed: 20 January 2020
- Jurisdiction: Bermuda
- Motto: Quo Data Ferunt
- Office executive: Alexander McD White, Privacy Commissioner
- Key document: Personal Information Protection Act 2016
- Website: privacy.bm

The Privacy Commissioner for Bermuda is an independent public office of Bermuda with a mandate "to regulate the use of personal information by organisations in a manner which recognizes both the need to protect the rights of individuals in relation to their personal information and the need for organisations to use personal information for legitimate purposes, among other duties."

The office was created by the Personal Information Protection Act 2016 and oversees any individual, entity or public authority that uses personal information.

The Privacy Commissioner has the authority to conduct investigations concerning compliance, make orders, educate the public and engage in research, give guidance, and "do anything which reasonably appears to him [sic] to be incidental or conducive to the carrying out of his [sic] functions under this Act."

The current Commissioner is Gretchen K. Tucker, who was appointed on March 02, 2026 by the Governor of Bermuda.

== Privacy Commissioners ==
There has been two Privacy Commissioners since the office was established.

Name	Term
Alexander McD White	2020–2025
Gretchen K. Tucker	2026–present

== See also ==
- Information Commissioner's Office for Bermuda
- Government of Bermuda privacy page
