= Science News =

American magazine

- Cover of the November 16, 2013, issue
- Editor in Chief: Nancy Shute
- Former editors: Tom Siegfried, Edwin Emery Slosson, Kendrick Frazier, Robert J. Trotter, Joel Greenberg, Julie Ann Miller
- Categories: Science
- Frequency: Monthly
- Publisher: Maya Ajmera
- Total circulation (2024): 107,166
- First issue: 1922
- Company: Society for Science
- Country: United States
- Based in: Washington, D.C.
- Language: English
- Website: www.sciencenews.org
- ISSN: 0036-8423

Science News (SN) is an American monthly magazine devoted to articles about new scientific and technical developments, typically gleaned from recent scientific and technical journals. The periodical has been described as having a scope across "all sciences" and as having "up to date" coverage.

== History ==
Science News has been published since 1922 by the Society for Science & the Public, a non-profit organization founded by E. W. Scripps in 1920. American chemist Edwin Slosson served as the publication's first editor. From 1922 to 1966, it was called Science News Letter. The title was changed to Science News with the March 12, 1966, issue (vol. 89, no. 11).

Tom Siegfried was the editor from 2007 to 2012. In 2012, Siegfried stepped down, and Eva Emerson became the Editor in Chief of the magazine. In 2017, Eva Emerson stepped down to become the editor of a new digital magazine, Annual Reviews. On February 1, 2018, Nancy Shute became the Editor in Chief of the magazine.

In April 2008, the magazine changed from a weekly format to a biweekly format, and the website was redeployed. The April 12 issue (Vol.173 #15) was the last weekly issue. The first biweekly issue (Vol.173 #16) was dated May 10 and featured a new design. The 4-week break between the last weekly issue and the first biweekly issue was explained in the Letter from the Publisher (p. 227) in the April 12 issue.

In January 2025, the magazine began publishing on a monthly basis, with significant changes to style, format, and physical aspects.

== Departments ==
The articles of the magazine are placed under "News":

- Life
- Matter and Energy
- Atom and Cosmos
- Body and Brain
- Earth
- Genes and Cells

The articles featured on the magazine's cover are placed under "Features". The departments that remain constant from issue to issue are:

- Editor's Note—A column written by Eva Emerson, the magazine's editor-in-chief, that usually highlights the current issue's prime topics.
- Notebook—A page that includes several sections:
  - Say What?—A definition and description of a scientific term.
  - 50 Years Ago—An excerpt from an older issue of the magazine.
  - Mystery Solved—An explanation of the science underlying everyday life.
  - SN Online—Excerpts from articles published online.
  - How Bizarre...—An odd or interesting fact that may not be well known to the magazine's audience.
- Reviews and Previews—A discussion of upcoming and recently released books, movies and services.
- Feedback—Letters from readers commenting on the recent Science News articles.
- Comment—An interview with a researcher.

== See also ==
- Institute for Nonprofit News (member)
