= FNZ (company) =

Global financial services company

- Type: Private
- Industry: Global wealth management, financial services
- Founded: 2003 (23 years ago)
- Founder: Adrian Durham
- Headquarters: London, United Kingdom
- Area served: Global
- Key people: Blythe Masters, Group CEO Roman Regelman, Group President
- Number of employees: c. 6,000
- Website: fnz.com

FNZ is a global financial services company that provides investment platforms to major financial institutions and wealth management firms. As of March 2025, FNZ manages over US$2 trillion in assets. FNZ's technology platform provides services such as investment front office, tax wrappers and investment back office.

== Background ==
They partner with over 650 financial institutions, 12,000 wealth managers, and administer assets for over 26 million end investors. They hold offices in 30+ global locations.

FNZ's customers include Aviva, Barclays, Lloyds Banking Group, Quilter, Nucleus Financial, Santander and Vanguard.

== History ==
FNZ was founded in 2003 by its former Group CEO, Adrian Durham. It began as a business unit within the New Zealand branch of investment bank Credit Suisse. This was followed by the expansion of operations to the UK in 2005, and a management buyout of the First NZ Capital Group (formerly Credit Suisse) in January 2009 for a price of NZ$34 million, backed by private equity firm H.I.G. Capital.

In 2012, global growth equity firm General Atlantic acquired a minority share in FNZ.

In June 2013, Lord Leitch was appointed Group Chairman of FNZ.

In October 2018, CDPQ and Generation Investment Management agreed to purchase the two-thirds ownership of FNZ from HIG Capital and General Atlantic in a deal valuing FNZ at £1.6 billion.

In February 2020, Temasek acquired a stake in FNZ.

In February 2022, FNZ raised US$1.4 billion in new capital from CPP Investments and Motive Partners which valued FNZ at US$20 billion.

In September 2024, Blythe Masters succeeded Adrian Durham as Group CEO. Durham became a non-executive founding director and senior adviser, remaining on the board as a major shareholder. At the same time, Roman Regelman joined as Group President. At the same time, FNZ announced a further US$1bn of capital from its existing institutional investors.

Gregor Stewart was appointed as Group Chair in 2024, with Lord Leitch becoming Group Chair Emeritus. In August 2026, FNZ announced that Stewart would be succeeded as Group Chair by Stephen Welch, remaining on the board as senior independent director and chair of its risk committee.

=== Acquisitions ===
In 2018, FNZ completed the acquisition of German investment platform company, ebase (European Bank for Financial Services) from Commerzbank.

In July 2019, FNZ acquired London-based JHC Systems Ltd, a provider of platform software to the wealth management industry. Later in November of the same year, FNZ acquired GBST for A$269m, which prompted the Competition and Markets Authority (CMA) to launch an inquiry into the deal's impact on competition in the UK retail investment platform market. The final decision from the CMA was for FNZ to sell GBST with rights to repurchase GBST's capital markets operations.

In 2020, FNZ acquired Irish third-party administration provider Irish Progressive Services International (IPSI) from Irish Life.

In 2021 it acquired South African third-party administration firm Silica from Ninety One plc, and it acquired investment platform Hatch from Kiwi Wealth.

In 2022, it acquired Icelandic identity verification and privacy company Authenteq, Zurich-based client onboarding firm Appway, Swiss private banking technology company New Access, and German wealth-tech provider Diamos.

In 2023, it acquired US-based fixed-income fintech YieldX, Luxembourg-based B2B fund platform ifsam, and Germany's Fondsdepot Bank.
