= Global Fund for Women =

Nonprofit foundation for women's rights

- Founded: 1987
- Founder: Anne Firth Murray, Frances Kissling, Laura Lederer
- Type: 501(c)(3)
- Purpose: Women's rights
- Location: San Francisco, California
- Region served: Global
- Key people: Latanya Mapp Frett, former president and chief executive officer (through 2023); and Sharon Bhagwan Rolls and Blythe Masters, co-chairs, board of directors; Maria Núñez, secretary and chair of development, board of directors
- Revenue: $32,624,028 (FYE 06/2020)
- Website: www.globalfundforwomen.org

The Global Fund for Women is a non-profit foundation funding women's human rights initiatives. It was founded in 1987 by New Zealander Anne Firth Murray, and co-founded by Frances Kissling and Laura Lederer to fund women's initiatives around the world. It is headquartered in San Francisco, California. Since 1988, the foundation has awarded over $100 million in grants to over 4,000 organizations supporting progressive women's rights in over 170 countries. Ms. Magazine has called the Global Fund for Women "one of the leading global feminist funds."

== History ==
The Global Fund for Women awarded the organization's first grants in 1988 to eight grantees totaling $31,000.

In September 1996, Murray retired and was succeeded by Kavita N. Ramdas. Ramdas ended her 14-year tenure at the Global Fund in September 2010, and was succeeded by Musimbi Kanyoro in August 2011.

In September 2005, the Global Fund for Women created the Legacy Fund, which is the largest endowment in the world dedicated exclusively to women's rights. It donates over $8.5 million annually to women-led organizations.

Latanya Mapp Frett, who previously served as executive director of Planned Parenthood Global, was appointed president and CEO of the Global Fund for Women in June 2019, a role she held through the end of 2023.

== Profile ==
The Global Fund for Women is an international grantmaking foundation that supports groups working to advance the human rights of women and girls. They advocate for and defend women's human rights by making grants to support women's groups around the world.

Funds that support the Global Fund for Women are raised from a variety of sources and are awarded to women-led organizations that promote economic security, health, safety, education and leadership of women and girls.

The Global Fund for Women accepts grant proposals in any language and in any format.

== Issues and initiatives ==
- Access to Education
- Civic & Political Participation
- Economic & Environmental Justice
- Health & Sexual Rights
- Peace & Gender Violence
- Social Change Philanthropy
- Women Dismantling Militarism

== Publications ==
The Global Fund for Women publishes an annual report reporting their financial status, information on their grant partners, and recognition of their donors. This report also contains reflections, statistics and projections about the status of women and girls around the world.

The Global Fund for Women also publishes "Impact Reports" which focus on specific issues impacting women and girls.

== See also ==
- Feminism
- Kavita Ramdas
- Musimbi Kanyoro
- Reproductive rights
- Women's rights
