= Kemp Little =

International commercial law firm

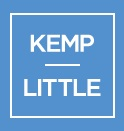
- Headquarters: London, United Kingdom
- No. of offices: One
- No. of lawyers: Approximately 50
- Major practice areas: Technology/media/telecoms/IP/employment
- Key people: David Williams (Managing Partner)
- Revenue: £10.56 million (2014)
- Date founded: 1997 (London)
- Company type: General partnership
- Website: www.kemplittle.com

Kemp Little LLP was a boutique technology-focused law firm based in London. It specialized in Technology, Media, Telecoms (TMT) sector, but also expanded into other practice areas such as corporate, litigation and employment. It was listed among the Financial Times Most Innovative Law Firms list for 2009.

== History ==
Kemp Little was founded in 1997 by Richard Kemp after he left a law firm under the now defunct firm Andersen Legal, called Garretts. Originally launched as Kemp & Co., Kemp spent the first few weeks of the company's inception practising on his own before his colleague Ashley Winton joined him, before he moved on to White & Case.

With its focus on technology, the law firm was able to ride the Dotcom boom, growing rapidly and even avoiding damage when the 'bubble' burst. However, when the boom did end, growth did slow down notably. Jonathan Little joined the company in 1999 and Kemp & Co. became Kemp Little two years later in 2001. At the same time, Kemp Little became the first law firm ever to transfer to LLP status.

Jonathan Little quit in 2005 to join Simmons & Simmons but Kemp kept his surname in the brand as it was by now well established.

In May 2014, Richard Kemp left the law firm to establish his own IT boutique, Kemp IT Law.

On 29 January 2021, the Kemp Little team was acquired by Deloitte Legal. As of 30 January 2021, Kemp Little LLP ceased to operate as a firm of solicitors and practice law and ceased to be regulated and authorised by the Solicitors Regulation Authority. Kemp Little LLP is being re-named KL Heritage LLP.

== Practice Areas ==
- Commercial Technology
- Corporate
- Data Protection & Privacy
- Employment
- Financial Regulation
- Intellectual Property
- Litigation
- Tax
- Outsourcing
- Venture Capital & Private Equity

== Kemp Little Consulting ==
On 17 October 2013, Kemp Little Consulting was launched by the law firm, creating a consultancy for matters relating to technology and law. The consultancy is headed by Chris Wray and Jim Odell.

== Clients ==
Some of Kemp Little's clients include: Activision, Deloitte, Expedia, London Stock Exchange, Microsoft, T-Mobile, Toshiba and Thomson Reuters. Clients in the past have included the London Stock Exchange, Standard Chartered Bank, FTSE and Ticketmaster.

In its latest financial results, the firm announced it was working for over 10 percent of the FTSE 100, in addition to over 15 Fortune 500 companies and numerous technology businesses.
