= The Global Fund for Children =

Nonprofit organization based in the U.S.

Global Fund for Children
- Founded: 1994
- Founder: Maya Ajmera
- Type: Non-governmental organization
- Headquarters: Washington, DC, United States
- Region served: 80 countries (2015)
- Key people: John Hecklinger, Co-CEO (since 2017) Hayley Roffey, Co-CEO (since 2024)
- Website: globalfundforchildren.org

Global Fund for Children (GFC) is a Washington, DC–headquartered nonprofit organization that envisions a future where all children are safe, strong, and valued. GFC pursues this mission by providing flexible grants to innovative community-based organizations working with children and young people, that are often overlooked by larger traditional funders.

== History ==
Global Fund for Children was established in 1994 and made its first grants with the royalties from its children's book publishing venture. Since then, GFC's grantmaking capacity has grown dramatically. To date, GFC has awarded over $90 million in grants to more than 1,500 organizations, reaching more than 11 million children and young people worldwide.

In 2003, the fund became one of the early sponsors of solar-powered floating schools in Bangladesh. The project has been recognized as one of the most innovative educational projects in the world.

In 2006, GFC, American Jewish World Service, EMPower-The Emerging Markets Foundation, Firelight Foundation, Global Fund for Women and Mama Cash joined forces with the Nike Foundation to establish the Grassroots Girls Initiative (GGI). GGI was the first donor consortium devoted exclusively to grassroots solutions for adolescent girls.

In 2007, GFC launched its Under-8 Initiative (U8), a pledge to invest $10 million over five years in groups working with children under the age of eight in developing countries in Asia, Africa and Latin America. The initiative was sponsored by the Clinton Foundation as part of the Clinton Global Initiative. Within the first year of operation it reached an estimated 47,000 children in 19 countries and awarded a total of $487,300 in grants.

In 2012, the Financial Times selected Global Fund for Children as its Seasonal Appeal winner. GFC was profiled in a series of online and print articles from November 2012 through January 2013 and as a result raised $4.89 million for GFC programs.

In 2018, GFC launched an anti-trafficking cohort in partnership with a Canadian conglomerate. The approach is to place early stage bets on high-potential social entrepreneurs with an ultimate goal of creating scalable and contextual solutions to prevent trafficking at the root.

In 2021, GFC launched the youth-led Spark Fund, its first fund that placed key funding decisions in the hands of young people. The Spark Fund seeks to drive youth-led transformation across the world by addressing social issues from climate change, mental health, LGBTQ+ rights, to gender justice and more.

In response to Russia's war on Ukraine, GFC enhanced the speed and capacity of its emergency response operations, distributing urgent funds to community-based organizations in Ukraine and neighboring countries.

Other GFC strategic partnerships include Goldman Sachs, Credit Suisse, Johnson & Johnson, Howard G. Buffett Foundation, Oak Foundation, GoodWeave, Feizy Rugs, Tea Collection, Postcode Lottery, and Kellogg Foundation.

== Approach ==
Global Fund for Children supports locally led organizations across the world and young leaders to create real, lasting change by pairing flexible, trust-based funding with targeted support that strengthens their capacity.

GFC strategically invests in grassroots organizations and helps them to grow and become sustainable resources in their communities. The organization intentionally scouts out and supports small, emerging nonprofits that do not have other sources of funding—in 2013, GFC was the first US-based institutional funder for 83% of its new grantees. On average, GFC's grantee partners grow threefold in size and reach during their partnership with GFC, expanding their capacity to reach more children in need.

In a 2014 survey of GFC grantee partners, 91% of respondents agreed that GFC stands apart from other funders because GFC contributes to its partners' long-term sustainability.

== Children's books ==
Global Fund for Children books aim to integrate children's perspectives and inspire young readers to explore diverse cultures and global understanding. The GFC book collection includes more than 30 full-color books for children from infancy to adolescence. Proceeds from book purchases help support GFC programs.

== Films ==
Global Fund for Children has invested in two documentary films:

War Child, a 2008 documentary about former Sudanese child soldier Emmanuel Jal, won the audience choice award at the Tribeca film festival.

Journey of a Red Fridge tells the story of Hari Rai, a child porter who carries a red Coca-Cola refrigerator through the Himalayan mountains. Filmed by Lunam Docs, a Serbian independent documentary production duo – Lucian and Natasa Muntean – who specialize in telling the stories of child laborers.
