= Balsamiq =

Web-based software design tool for creating wireframes

- Logo since 2025
- Type: Private
- Founded: March 2008
- Founder: Peldi Guilizzoni
- Revenue: $6.4 million (2015)
- Website: http://www.balsamiq.com/

Balsamiq Studios is an ISV founded in March 2008 by Peldi Guilizzoni, a former Adobe senior software engineer. The Web-based Balsamiq mockup tool was launched in June 2008. Balsamiq has 33 employees based in San Francisco, Sacramento, Chicago, Bologna, Paris, and Bremen. In 2011, Balsamiq achieved almost US$5 million in sales, and US$6.4 million in 2015.

== Products ==
=== Balsamiq Wireframes ===
Balsamiq Wireframes
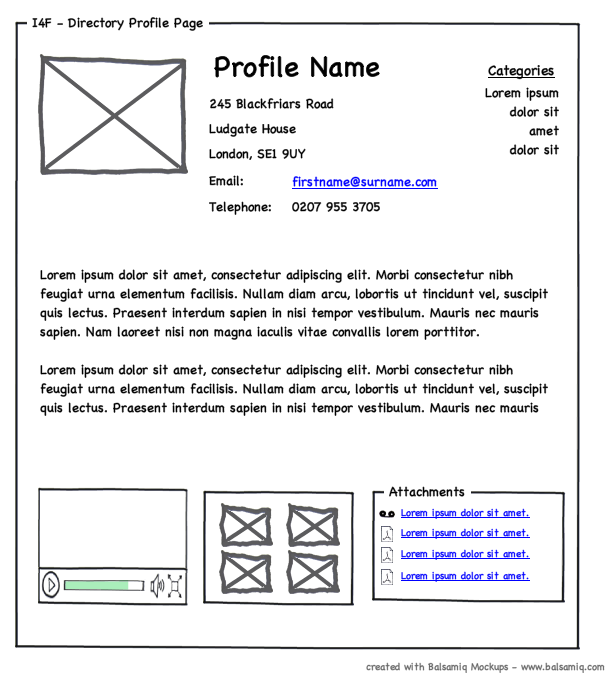
- Example page
- Developers: Balsamiq Studios, LLC
- Stable release: 4.5.2 / May 3, 2022; 4 years ago
- Operating system: Windows, macOS
- Website: www.balsamiq.com
- As of: January 2018

Balsamiq Wireframes is a graphical user interface website wireframe builder application. It allows the designer to arrange pre-built widgets using a drag-and-drop WYSIWYG editor. The application is offered in a desktop version as well as a plug-in for Google Drive, Confluence and JIRA.

Versions for FogBugz and XWiki were offered until November 1, 2013.

== See also ==
- Mockup
- Prototyping
- Rapid application development
- Rapid prototyping
- Software Prototyping
- User interface design
- Website wireframe
