= Emma Reh =

American journalist

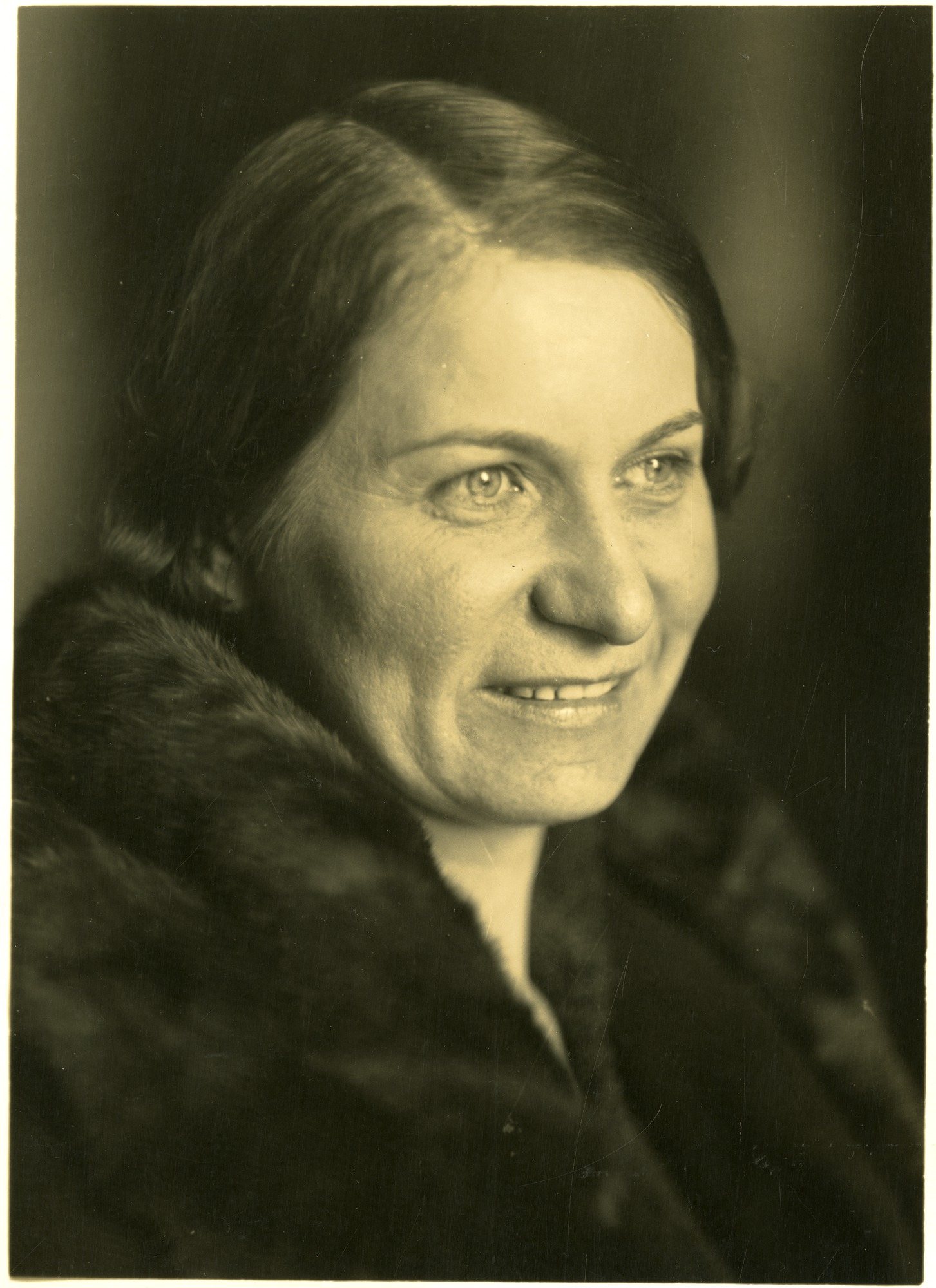
- Reh c. 1935
- Born: 1896
- Died: 1982 (aged 85–86)
- Education: George Washington University
- Occupation: Journalist
- Spouse: Tom Stevenson (–1931)
- Writing career
- Language: English
- Subjects: Archaeology, food consumption

Emma Reh Stevenson (1896–1982) was an American journalist who worked as a reporter for the Science Service, reporting on archeological excavations in Mexico, as well as the social and political situation in that country. She was also a writer for the United States Soil Conservation Service and the United Nations' Food and Agriculture Organization, exploring issues of food consumption and distribution problems.

== Early life and education ==
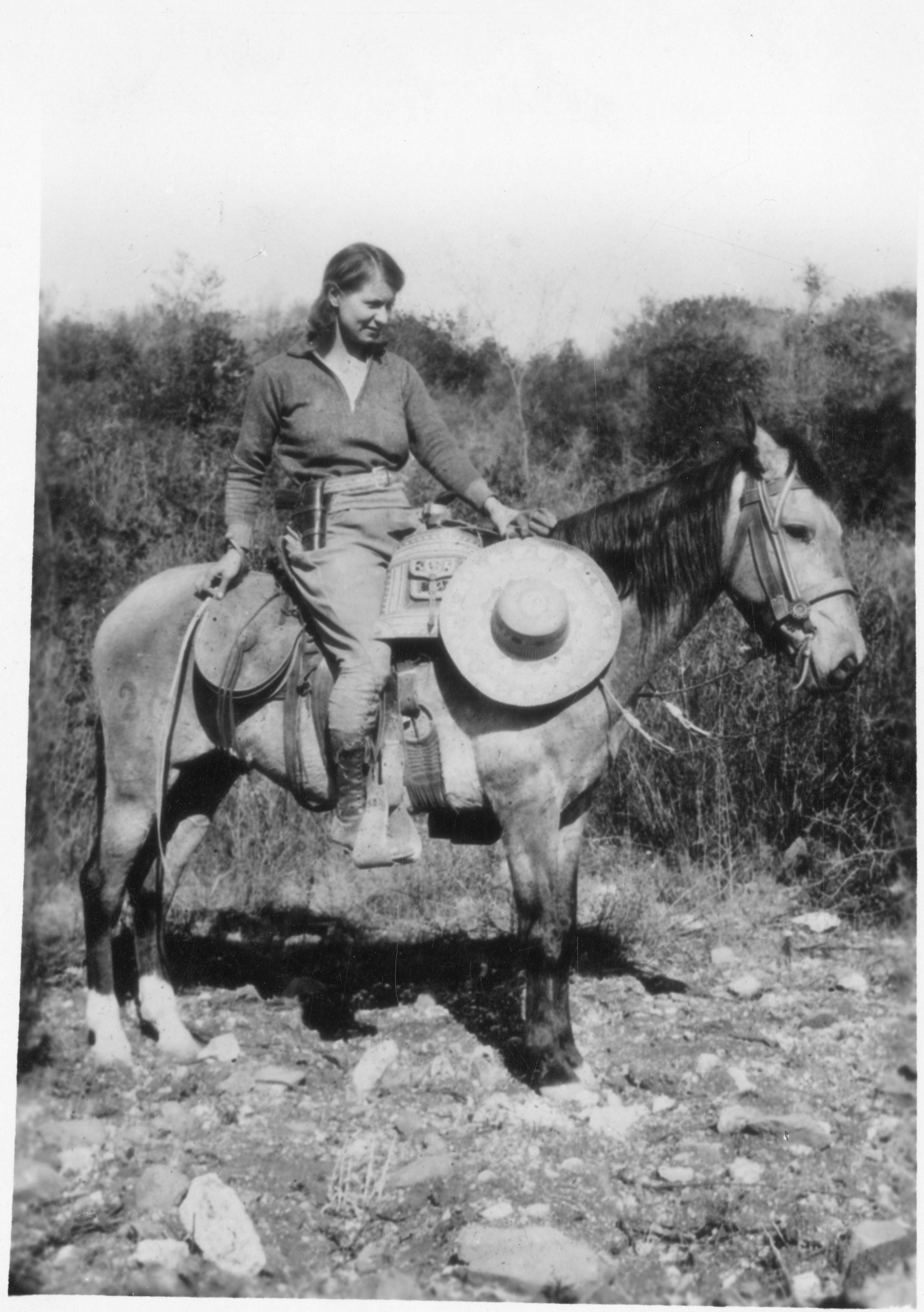
Reh in Oaxaca, Mexico, in the 1930s

Reh attended George Washington University, where she graduated in 1917.

== Career ==
After graduating from college, Reh began work for the recently formed Science Service in 1924. Although she officially retired in 1926 after her marriage to Tom Stevenson, Reh continued as a frequent contributor to Service publications well into the 1930s. Reh's close friends and colleagues included staff writers Frank Thorne, Emily Davis, and Marjorie MacDill Breit.

In the summer of 1926, Reh moved to Mexico and returned to publishing under her maiden name. There, she

"served as a regular Science Service correspondent, submitting articles and photographs mainly related to archeology, ...such...as the excavation of Tenayuca, preservation of prehistoric Indian sites in Mexico, analysis of Indian pottery, city planning in prehistoric Indian cities, the excavation of San Juan Teotihuacan, relics from the Inca Cemetery at Copiapo, the Seri Indians, public art education in Mexico, bricks in prehistoric American buildings, and the discovery of Santa Elena in Poco-Uinic."

Reh and Stevenson ended their marriage in 1931. In 1935, during the Great Depression, Reh returned to the U.S. and secured a position as a writer with the federal Soil Conservation Service. Her later work "addressed food consumption and related patterns or problems in various communities, including the Navajo" in the Southwest.

During her career, Reh perceived that "her status as a woman had both aided and hindered her." She acknowledged that access to some information was due to "the chivalry of men" while, other times, she had to convince people that "a girl could handle (woman, excuse me)" certain situations. She said of science,

"Science is like religion in Latin America. It enables a lady to travel and do all sorts of unheard things and wear the halo at the same time. If I represented a regular paper or news service I would be thrown into the vulgar political reporter class, than whom there is none worse in Mexico, and I suppose other similar countries."

Reh also contributed to Mexican News Features, The Christian Science Monitor, and The New York Times. She was a member of the Yucatán-British Honduras-Chiapas expedition group. In the late 1930s, she worked for the US Soil Conservation Service in New Mexico and the Office of Indian Affairs in Arizona, where she conducted pioneering research on the food habits of indigenous nations.

She joined the United Nations' Food & Agricultural Organization (FAO) in 1946 and worked with them until her retirement in the early 1960s. Reh was the FAO specialist for food consumption surveys, but was also instrumental in training Central American nutritionists. She also participated in setting up food programs at schools in Central America. Reh recognized that the poverty of the region was the major cause of malnutrition; she objected to medicalized approaches to resolving hunger and malnutrition.

== See also ==
- Browman, David L. (2013). Cultural Negotiations: The Role of Women in the Founding of Americanist Archaeology. Lincoln, NE: University of Nebraska Press.
- Pernet, Corinne A. (2018). "FAO from the Field and from Below: Emma Reh and the Challenges of Doing Nutrition Work in Central America," International History Review.
- Reh, Emma (1962). Manual on Household Food Consumption Surveys. Vol. 18. London: The Whitefriars Press Ltd. pp. 1–96. ISBN 9789251000809. PMID 13973671. ;
