= Digital Asset Holdings =

American financial technology company

Digital Asset
- Industry: Distributed Ledger Technology
- Founded: October 2014 in New York City, United States
- Founders: Don R. Wilson, Sunil Hirani, Yuval Rooz, Eric Saraniecki, and Shaul Kfir
- Headquarters: New York City, United States
- Area served: Global
- Website: digitalasset.com

Digital Asset (or Digital Asset Holdings, LLC) is a financial technology company founded in 2014 by Sunil Hirani, Don R. Wilson, Yuval Rooz, Shaul Kfir and Eric Saraniecki. It builds products based on distributed ledger technology (DLT) and the Canton Network for banks and other financial institutions.

== History ==
Blythe Masters was CEO from 2015 to 2018, and was succeeded by Yuval Rooz.

On June 25, 2015 the Moneybeat column from The Wall Street Journal wrote that the "acquisition of HyperLedger might raise eyebrows in the bitcoin community, where there is aversion to the idea that Wall Street might co-opt blockchain technology and strip it of its decentralized nature."

In November 2021, Goldman Sachs announced that it will use Digital Asset's Daml technology for its tokenized asset platform.

In May 2022, SBI Holdings made a strategic investment in Digital Asset to build a programmable Japanese yen.

== Daml ==
Daml is an open-source smart contract language inspired by Haskell. It aids in modeling agreements and runs on blockchain platforms.
