= 115 Squadron (Israel) =

Israeli military unit

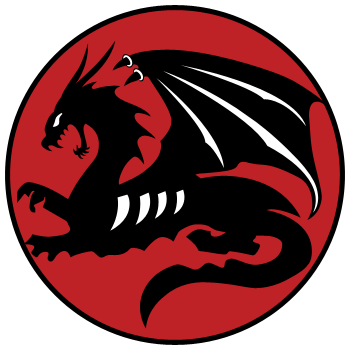
- Red Squadron logo
- Active: 1954–1958, 1969–1994, 2005–
- Country: Israel
- Branch: Israeli Air Force
- Role: Aggressor
- Garrison/HQ: Ovda
- Nickname: Flying Dragon / Red Squadron
- Engagements: Suez Crisis; War of Attrition; Yom Kippur War; 1982 Lebanon War

Commanders
- Notable commanders: Giora Romm

Insignia
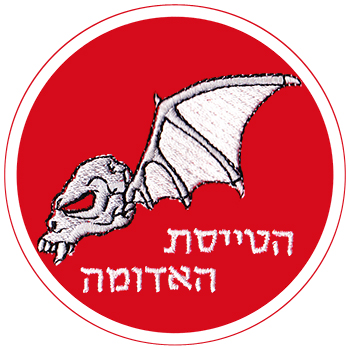
- Squadron Patch

Aircraft flown
- Fighter: F-16C/D Fighting Falcon

115 Squadron, also known as the Flying Dragon or Red Squadron, is the Israeli Air Force's aggressor squadron. Based at Ovda, it is the sole IAF squadron to operate fixed-wing aircraft, helicopters and ground-based assets.

== History ==
=== Formation ===
The squadron was established on July 8, 1954, as a semi-autonomous unit of 109 Squadron, specializing in photo-reconnaissance flights. Commanded by Captain Azriel Ronen, the squadron initially operated 4 de Havilland Mosquito PR.16s out of Hatzor Airbase. These were soon augmented by three Mosquito NF.30s converted to reconnaissance configuration. In June 1956, 115 became a fully independent squadron. Commanded by Major Eli Eron, the new unit was based at Tel Nof. It was soon bolstered by three additional PR.16s and three Gloster Meteor T.7s.

As Middle East tensions rose in the mid-1950s, 115 squadron operations were stepped up. It carried out reconnaissance missions throughout the region, flying as far as Iraq and Libya. Intelligence gathered during these missions proved valuable not only during the 1956 Suez Crisis, but in subsequent wars as well. In the run-up to Suez Crisis itself, the squadron gathered information on Egyptian forces and their dispositions in the Sinai. During the war it provided much-needed intelligence on enemy activity.

The squadron was disbanded in November 1958 with the withdrawal of the Mosquito from service. Its Meteors were allocated to other squadrons.

=== Flying the A-4 Skyhawk ===
115 Squadron was reformed in January 1969 at Tel Nof, as the IAF's third A-4 Skyhawk squadron. Its first three jets arrived at the port of Ashdod on March 20, and on March 28 the squadron flew its first flight. It soon achieved operational capability. On April 22 it flew its first combat sortie in the ongoing War of Attrition, against a radar station in Jordan.

In July it participated in operation Boxer, during which one of its aircraft was hit but managed to make a forced landing at Rephidim. The squadron participated in the Priha operations. During operation Rhodes, the January 1970 assault on the island of Shadwan, a squadron A-4 sunk an Egyptian torpedo boat. Altogether 115 Squadron flew about 1,000 sorties throughout the war.

Initially operating the A-4H, in 1972 the squadron made the conversion to the A-4N Skyhawk II. It was still flying both models when the Yom Kippur War broke out in October 1973. On October 3 the Squadron lost its commanding officer, Ami Gadish, when his aircraft crashed during a training sortie. On October 5, Giora Romm took command of the squadron, despite having never flown the Skyhawk nor serving with the unit. War broke out the next day, and Romm's first flight was a combat sortie targeting Egyptian troops crossing the Suez Canal, with Romm familiarizing himself with the aircraft en route to the target.

115 Squadron flew all types of attack missions during the Yom Kippur War, from close air support (CAS) to air base strikes and SEAD. The squadron suffered its first fatalities of the war on October 7, when Shimon Ash went missing during a strike against Egyptian anti-aircraft artillery, while Israel Rozenblum was killed on the Golan Heights. Two more aircraft was lost on the following day, both on the Egyptian front, with Zvi Bashan killed and Zvi Rozen becoming a prisoner of war. Another pilot, Mario Shaked, was lost on October 9. Two more aircraft were lost on October 11, with Yizhak Ofer killed on the Golan Heights and Schneider becoming a POW. These were the last of 115 Squadron's losses during the war, out of 750 sorties flown, a loss rate of 0.9 percent.

The squadron was back in action pounding Palestinian positions in southern Lebanon during the late 1970s and early 1980s. It saw extensive action during Operation Peace for Galilee, the 1982 invasion of Lebanon. On June 6, 1982, it lost one of its aircraft while on a strike near Beaufort Castle, with pilot Aharon Achiaz falling into Palestinian captivity. The squadron relocated to Nevatim in 1984, continuing to fly sporadic attacks against Lebanese targets during the subsequent decade, flying 38 sorties during Operation Accountability of April 1993. It was disbanded on July 21, 1994. Some of its aircraft went into storage, while others were dispersed among remaining IAF A-4 Squadrons.

=== Aggressor Squadron ===
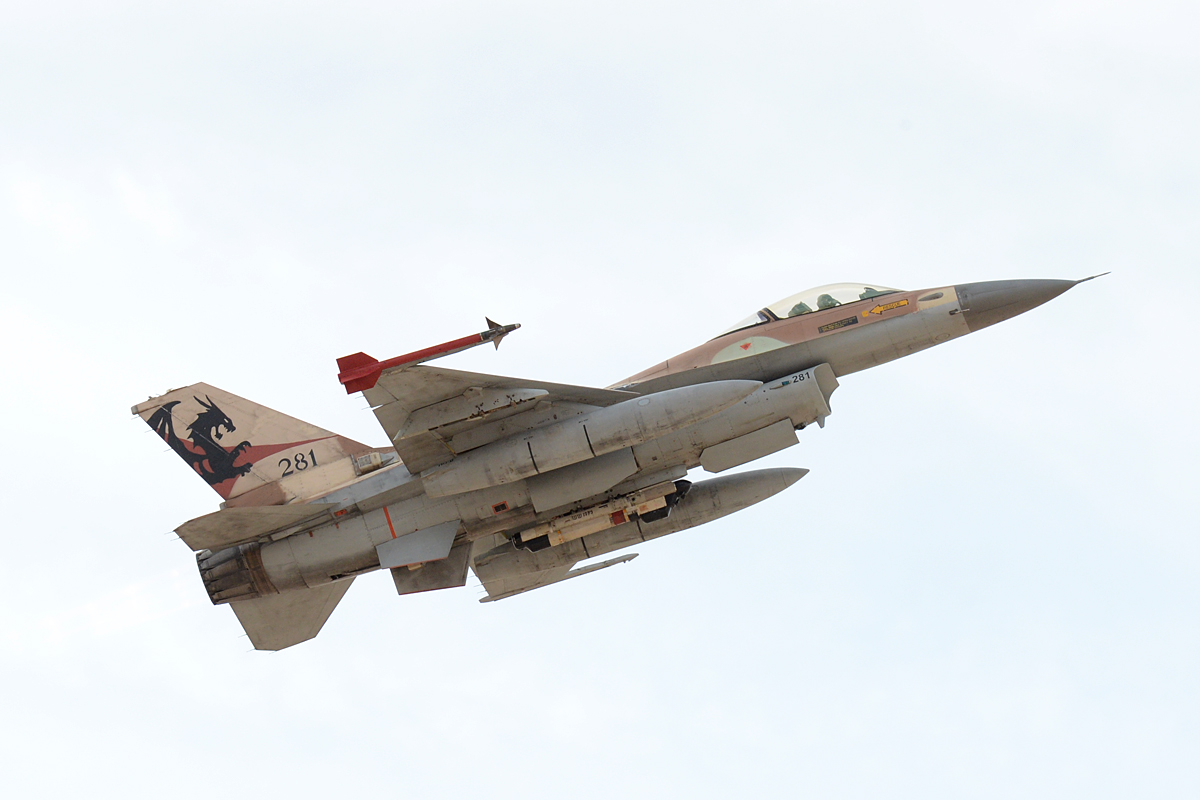
An F-16A of 115 Squadron

In March 2005 the squadron was reformed at Ovda as the IAF's Advanced Training Center, the initiative of former IAF commander-in-chief Eliezer Shkedy. Operating both F-16s and AH-1 Cobras, the unit is tasked with emulating enemy forces and tactics, creating scenarios as close as possible to what pilots may face in war. Holding training sessions for IAF combat squadrons, the squadron also operates a surface-to-air section, simulating enemy air defences. It is not an operational unit, though all its pilots have emergency postings and its aircraft are equipped to serve as combat aircraft in the event of war.

Modelled on USAF aggressor squadrons, the unit offers its services to other nations. In May 2006 it trained with the Massachusetts Air National Guard's 101st Fighter Squadron. In 2008, the squadron provided desert training for 55 Czech Air Force pilots prior to their deployment to Afghanistan. As a tribute to Czechoslovak military assistance to Israel during the 1948 Arab-Israeli War, the training session was named "Etzion", once the codename for the Czech airfield at Žatec from which a great deal of aircraft and material were dispatched to Israel.

In early December 2010, 115 Squadron hosted Italian Air Force Panavia Tornados at Ovda, conducting a week-long joint training session. In December 2011 the Israeli and Italian Air Forces completed another two-week joint training exercise. The exercise involved pilots flying F-16As, F-16Cs and F-15Is from three Israeli squadrons, pitted against Italian Air Force pilots flying Eurofighter Typhoons and Panavia Tornado strike fighters. In March 2012 the Polish Air Force's 10th Tactical Squadron deployed to Ovda for a two-week-long joint exercise with Israel's 115, 117 and 106 squadrons.

In December 2016 115 Squadron retired its F-16A/Bs, replacing them in April 2017 with the F-16C/D.

== See also ==
- Blue Flag (Israeli Air Force exercise)

== Bibliography ==
=== References ===
- Aloni, Shlomo (2009). Israeli A-4 Skyhawk Units in Combat. Combat Aircraft. UK: Osprey. ISBN 978-1-84603-430-5.
- Norton, Bill (2004). Air War on the Edge – A History of the Israel Air Force and its Aircraft since 1947. Midland Publishing. p. 250. ISBN 1-85780-088-5.
