= Flight 707 =

Flight 707 may refer to the following aviation incidents and accidents:

- Aerolíneas Argentinas Flight 707, crashed after severe turbulence on February 4, 1970
- Kish Air Flight 707, hijacked on September 19, 1995
