= Ovda Airbase =

Israeli Air Force Base

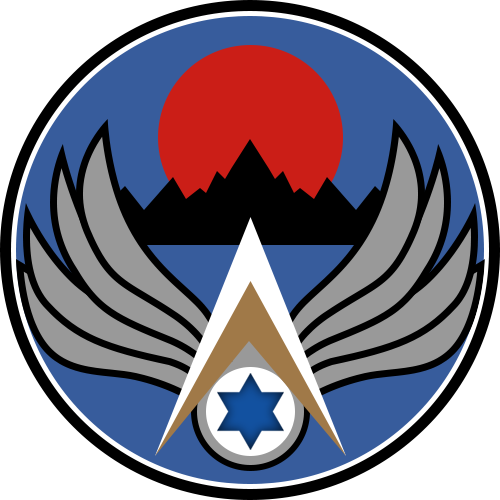
Ovda Israeli Air Force Base Air Force Base 10
- בסיס עובדה
- Uvda, Southern District in Israel
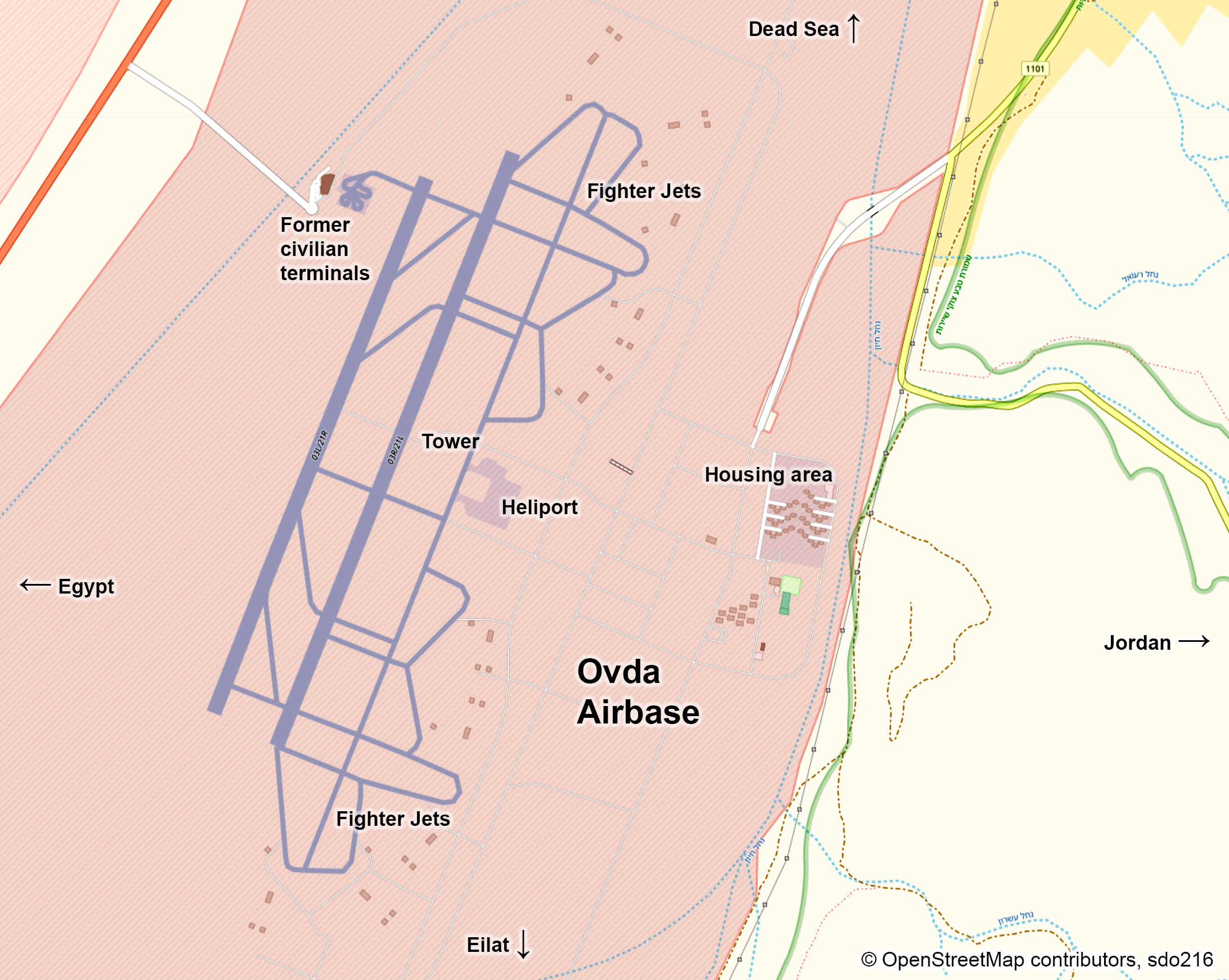

Site information
- Type: Airbase
- Owner: Israel Defense Forces
- Operator: Israeli Air Force

Location
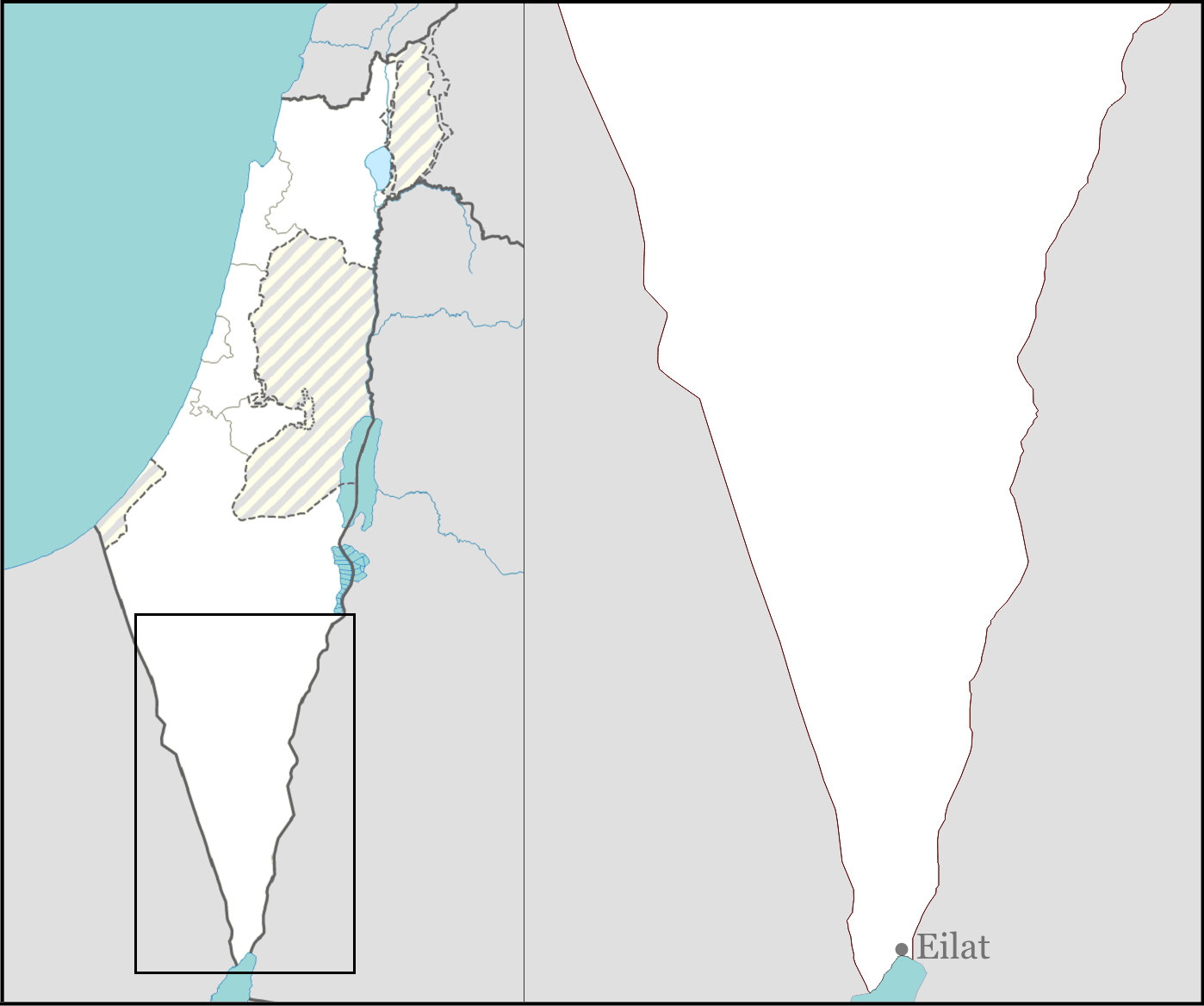
- Shown within Israel Ovda Airbase (Israel)
- Coordinates: 29°56′19″N 34°56′13″E

Site history
- Built: 1981
- In use: 1981–present

Airfield information
- Identifiers: IATA: VDA, ICAO: LLOV
- Elevation: 455 metres (1,493 ft) AMSL
Runways
Direction	Length and surface
03R/21L	3,000 metres (9,843 ft) Asphalt
03L/21R	2,600 metres (8,530 ft) Asphalt

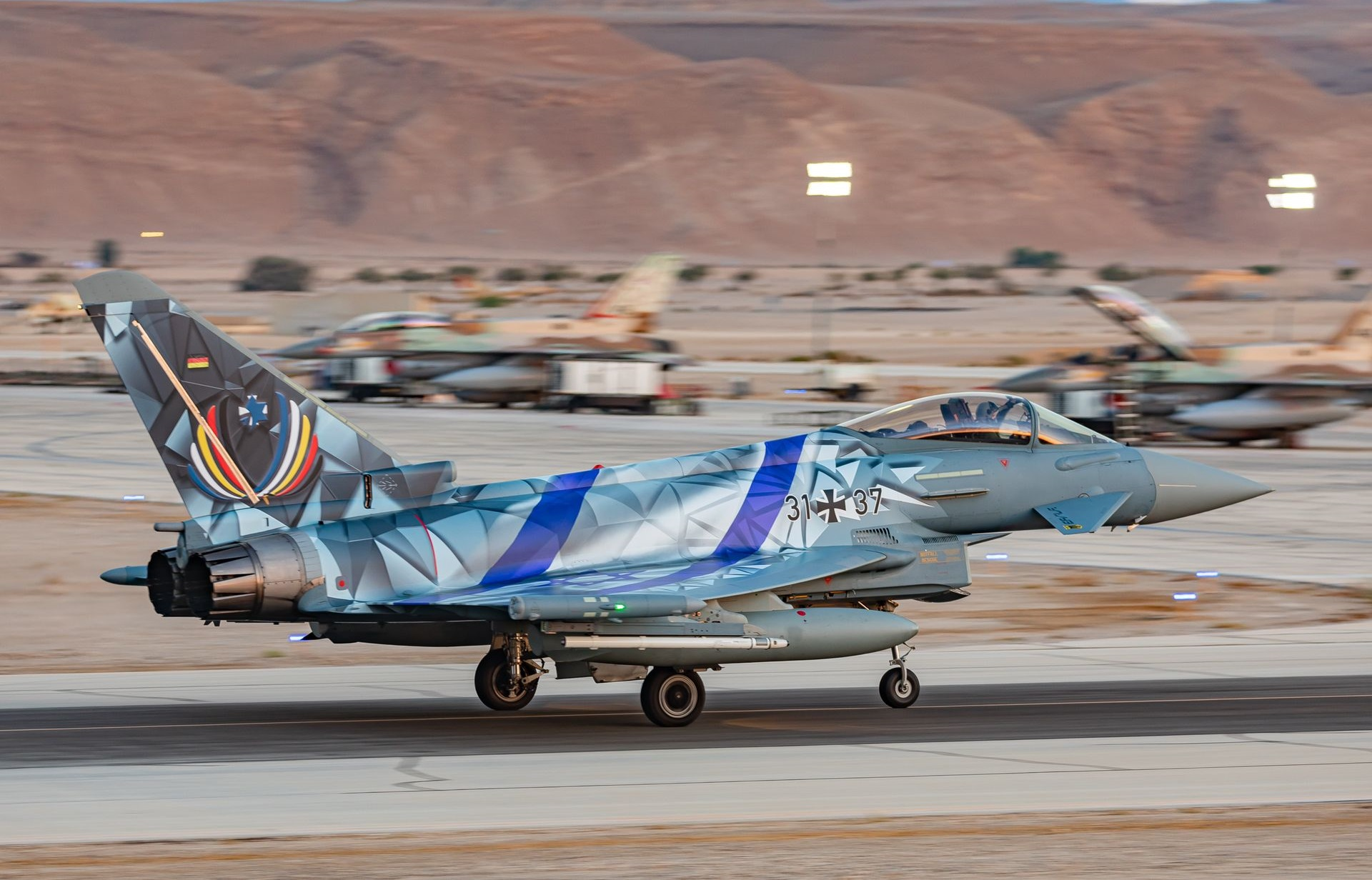
A Eurofighter Typhoon jet of the German Air Force (Deutsche Luftwaffe) with Israeli-German foiling during Blue Flag 2021 at Ovda Airbase

Ovda Airbase (Hebrew: בסיס עובדה, English: fact) is an Israeli Air Force (IAF) base, located in the very south of Israel, around 40 kilometers north of Eilat, in a large plain of the southern Negev desert. It has two runways with lengths of 3,000 and 2,600 meters and a heliport. There are no operational fighter jets or helicopters stationed there and a so-called "Aggressor Squadron" for pilot training was based there until May 2025. Until 2021 the international military aviation exercise Blue Flag took place there every two years. Since around 2024/25, a battery of Arrow anti-missiles has also been located on the airbase site. In August 2025, the base became a joint training center for IAF and ground troops (see: Today).

== History ==
=== Operation Uvda ===
In March 1949 – 8 km northwest to the current base – the temporary Abraham Airfield (Sde Avraham, 29°58′02″N 34°51′34″E) was set up during Operation Uvda to secure the southern Negev against Jordan shortly before the end of the First Arab–Israeli War.

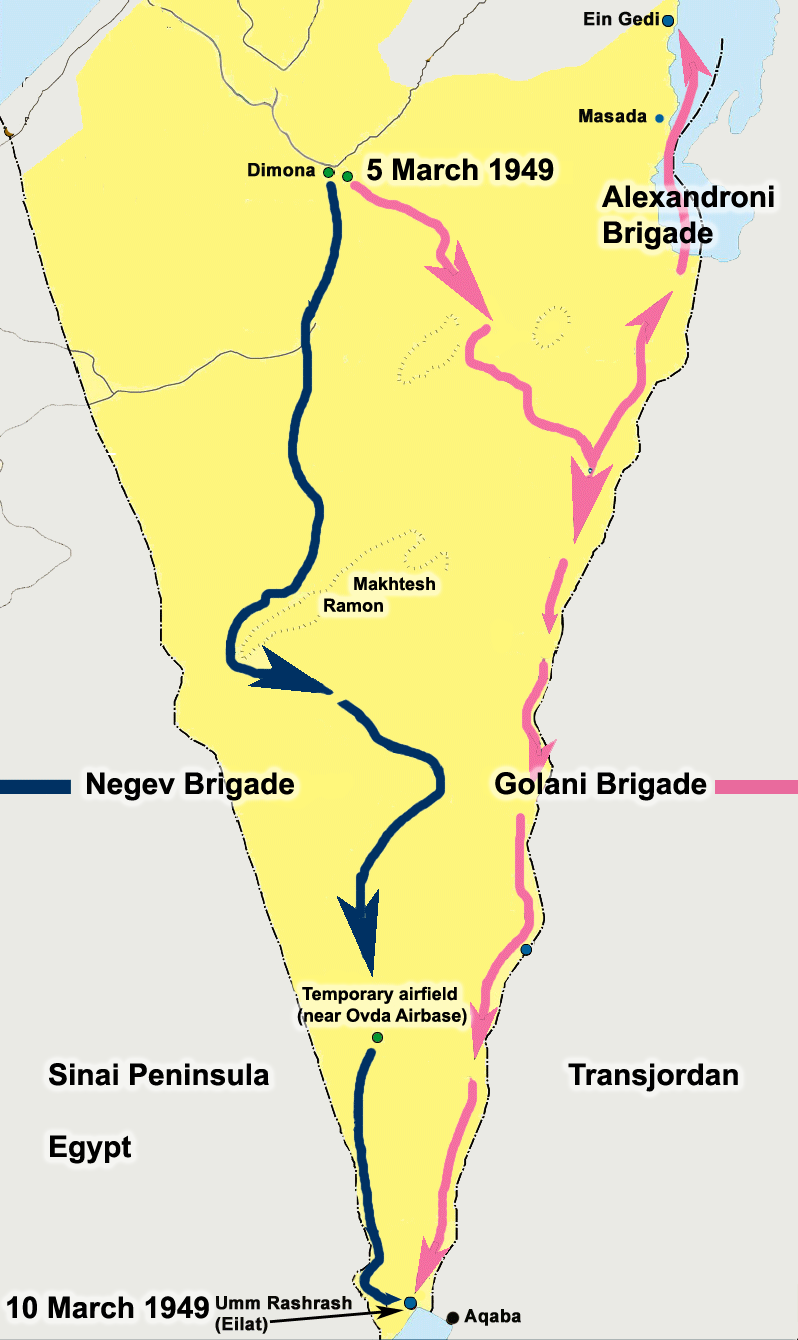
Map of Operation Uvda in 1949 with a temporary airfield in the southern Negev desert

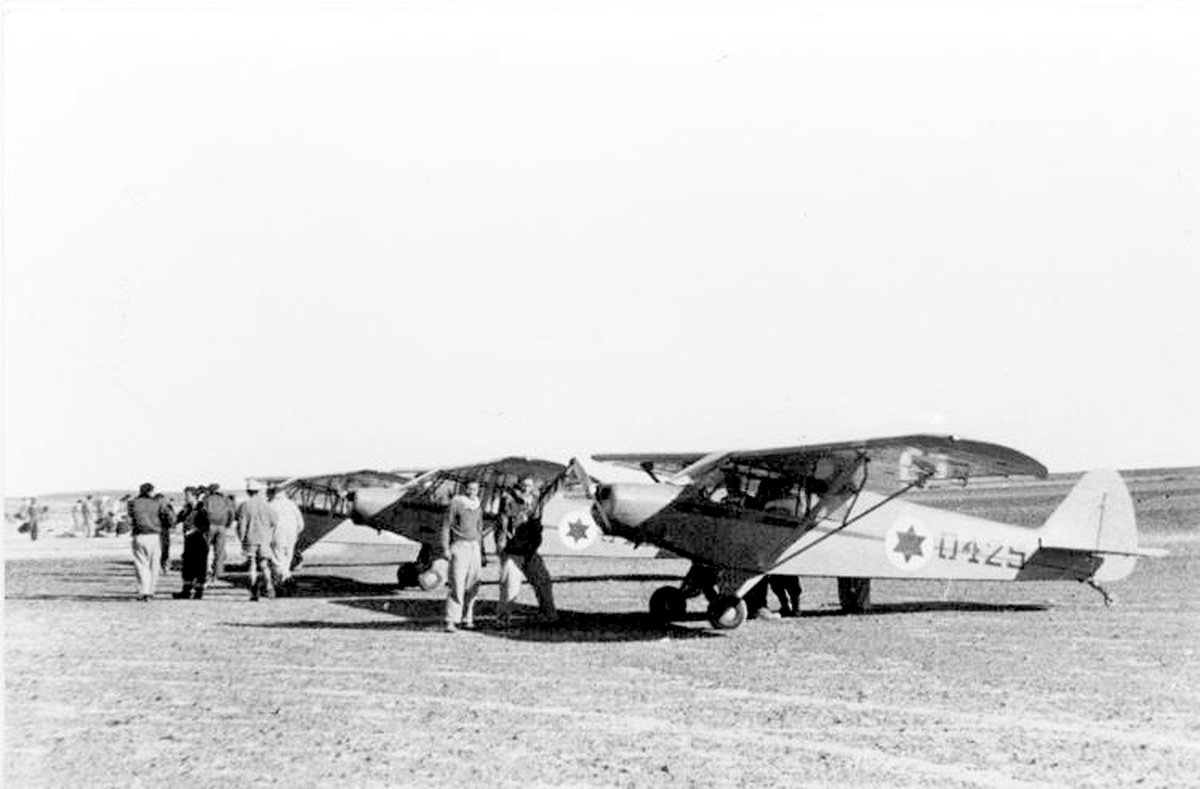
Piper PA-11 Cub Special planes on temporary Abraham Airfield (Sde Avraham) during Operation Uvda

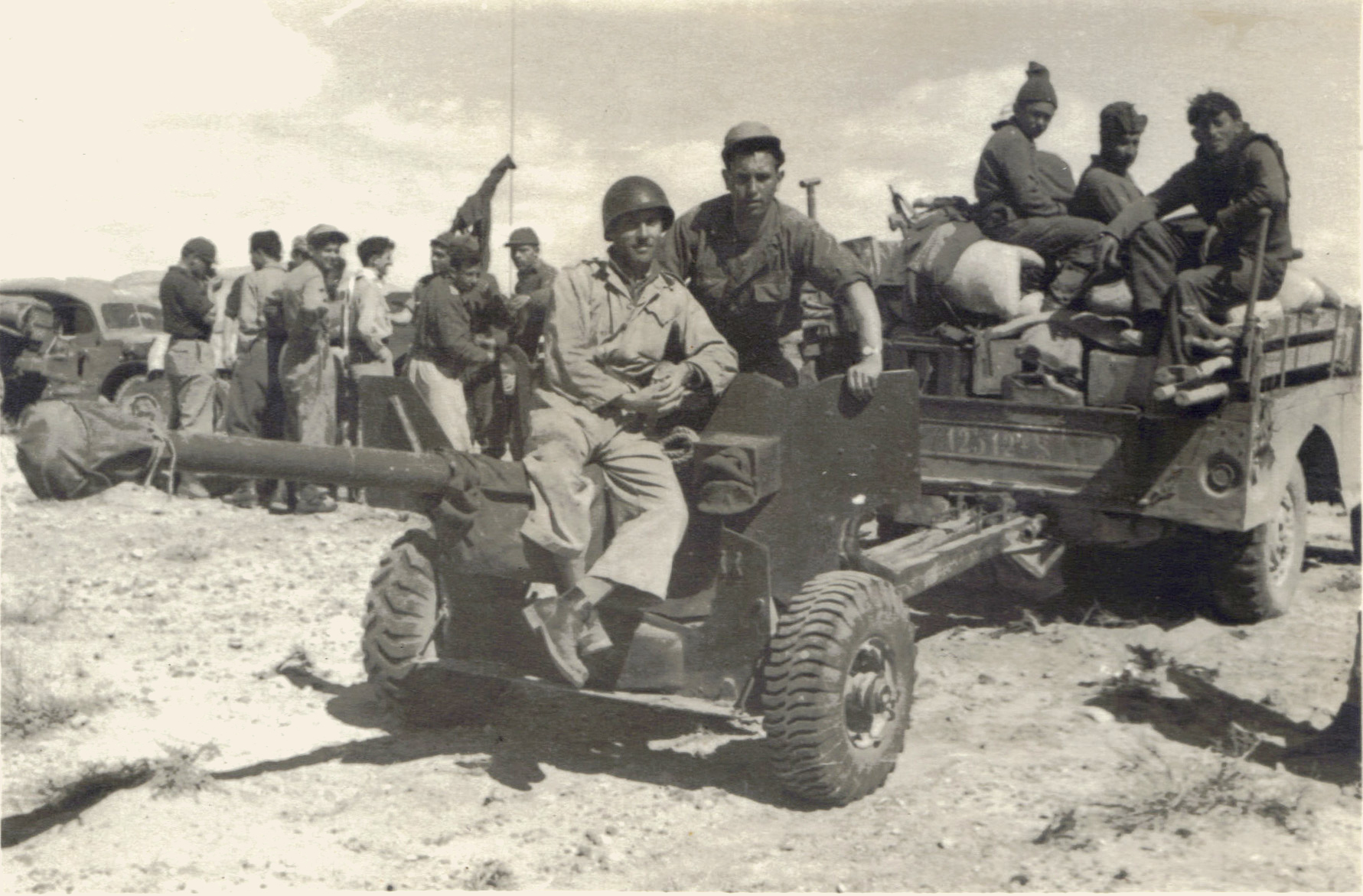
The IDF Golani Brigade during Operation Uvda on 9 March 1949

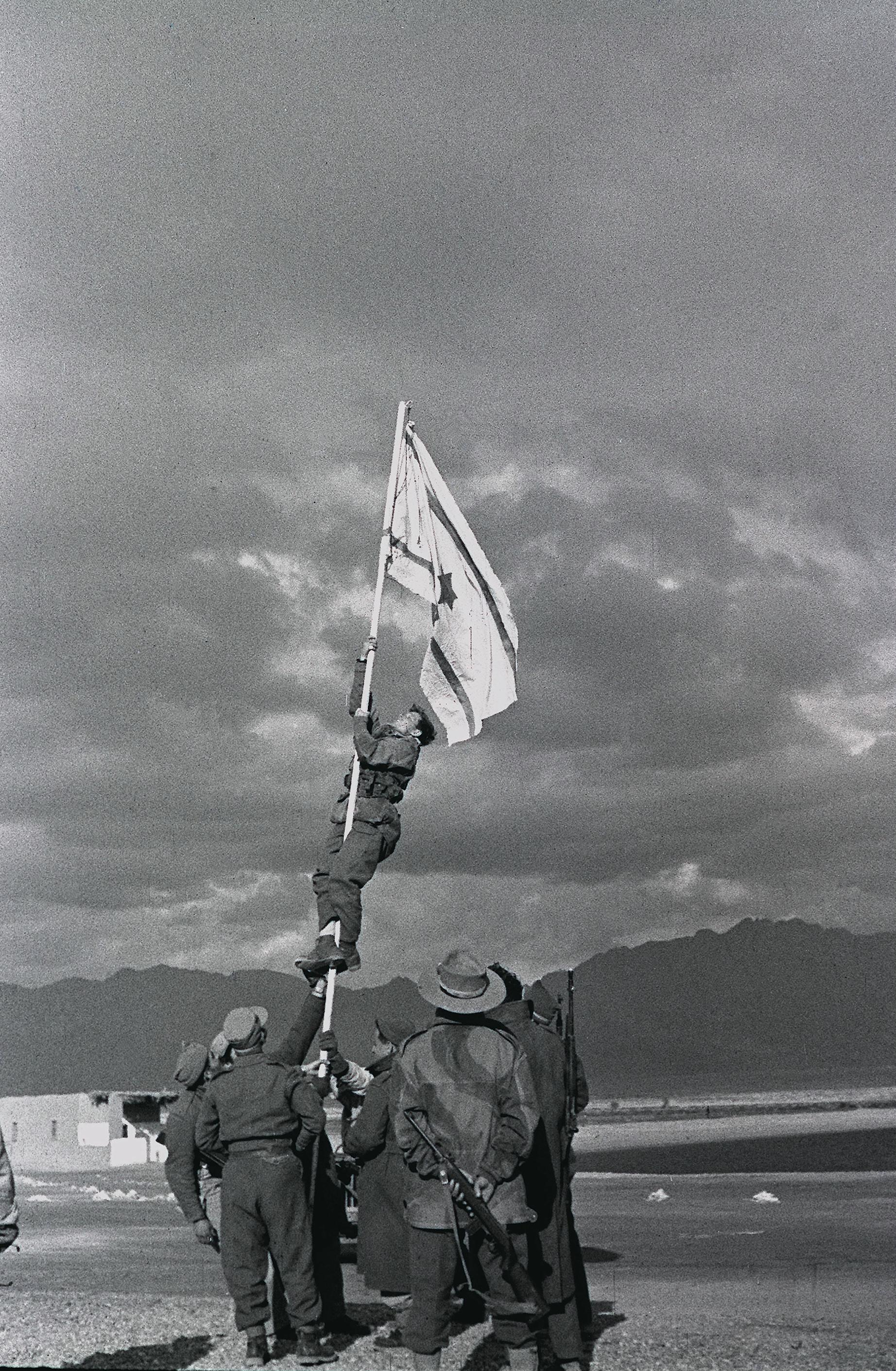
The Ink Flag is raised at Umm Rashrash (Eilat) on 10 March 1949, marking the end of the First Arab–Israeli War

=== Airbase and airport ===
In 1981 Ovda (Uvda) was opened as a military airbase (together with Nevatim and Ramon Airbase) – a replacement for the Etzion Airbase and three others on the Sinai Peninsula in Egypt, abandoned after the Camp David Accords (see map below).

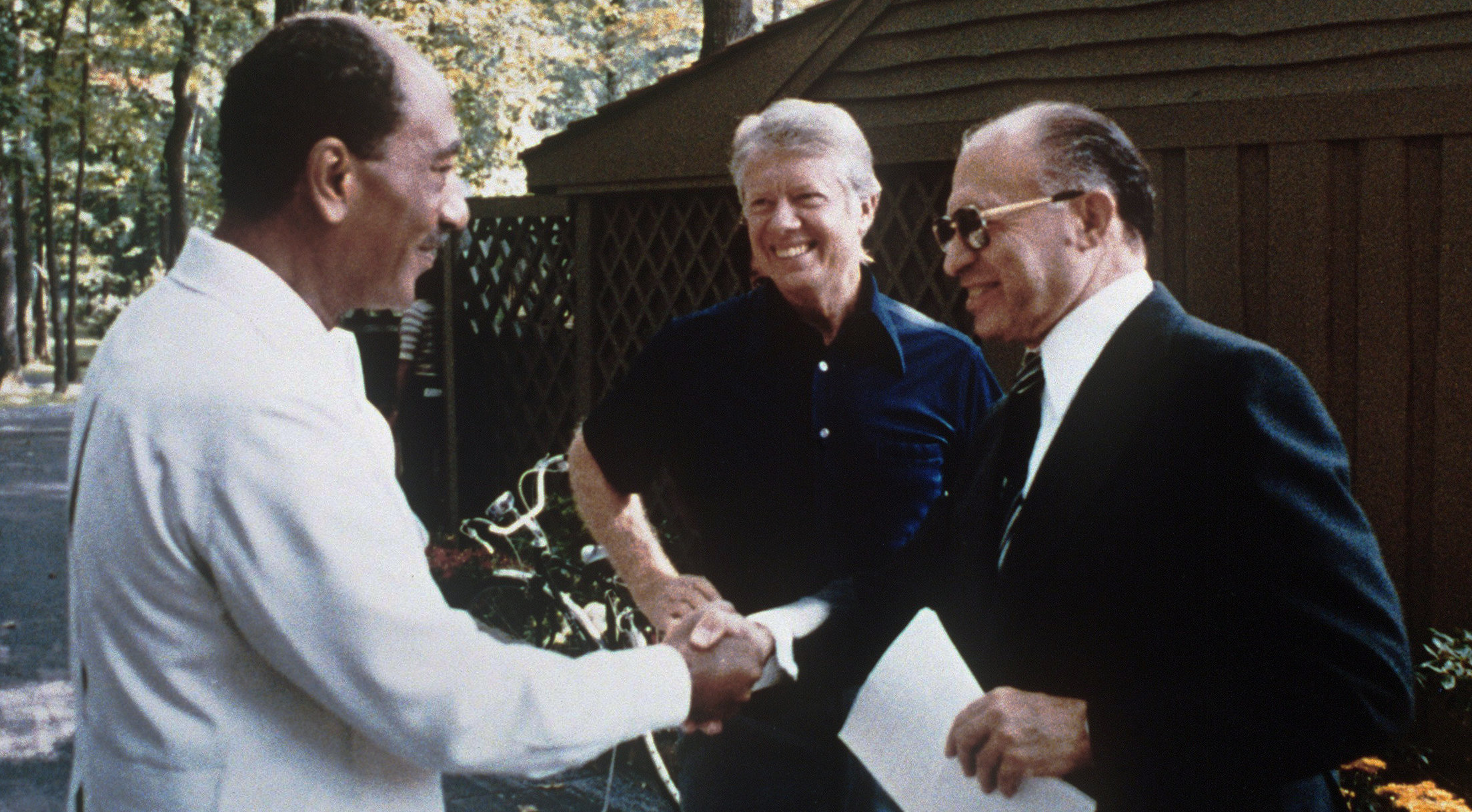
The then presidents Anwar Sadat, Jimmy Carter and Prime Minister Menachem Begin (left to right) at Camp David (USA) in Sept. 1978

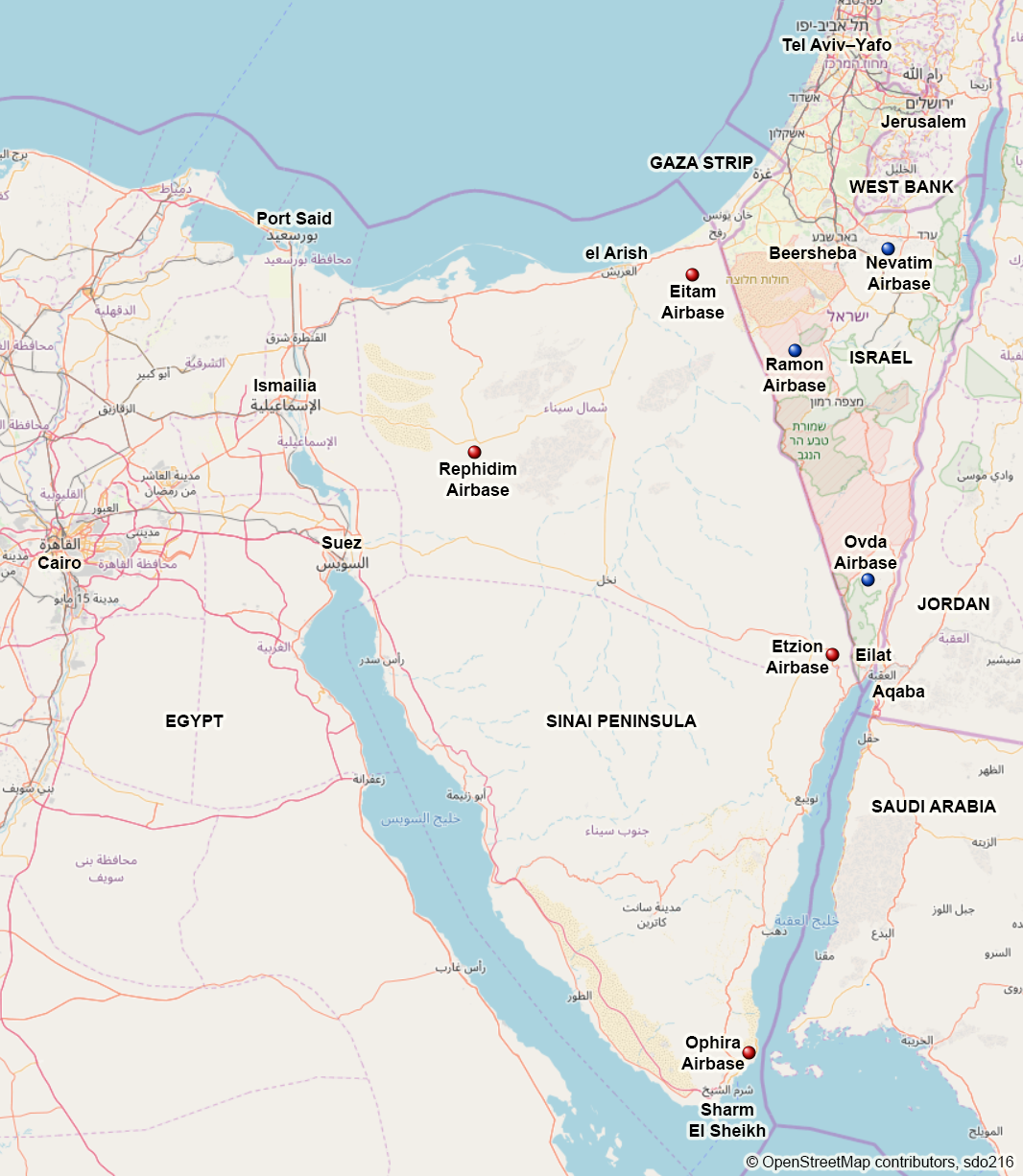
Abandoned IAF bases on the Sinai Peninsula (red) and newly established bases in southern Israel (blue)

From 1982 onwards it was also used as Ovda Airport for civil charter flights and from 1988 to 2019 for regular scheduled flights by holidaymakers from Europe who wanted to get to the seaside resort of Eilat on the Gulf of Aqaba.

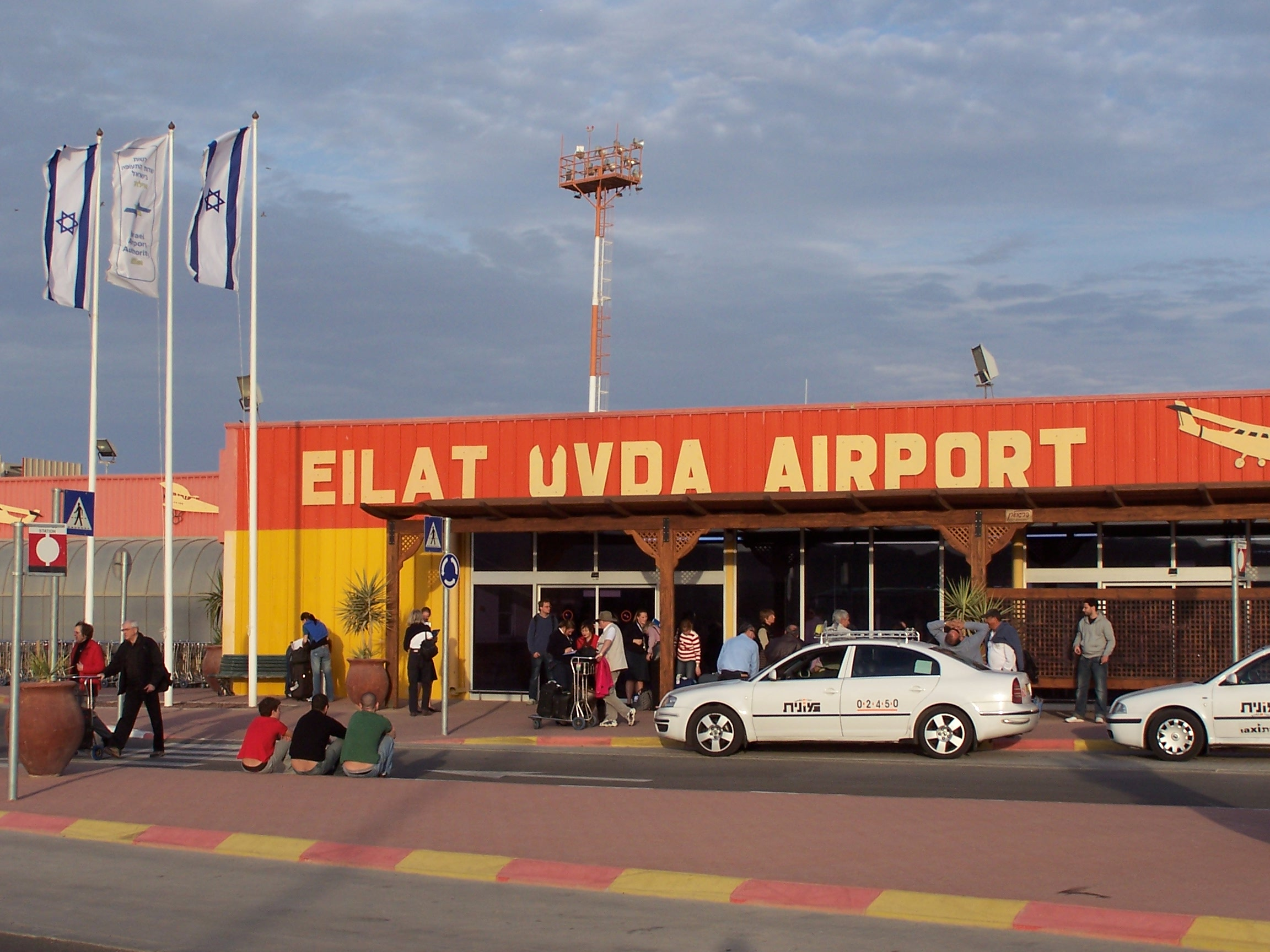
The first terminal of Eilat-Ovda Airport in 2006

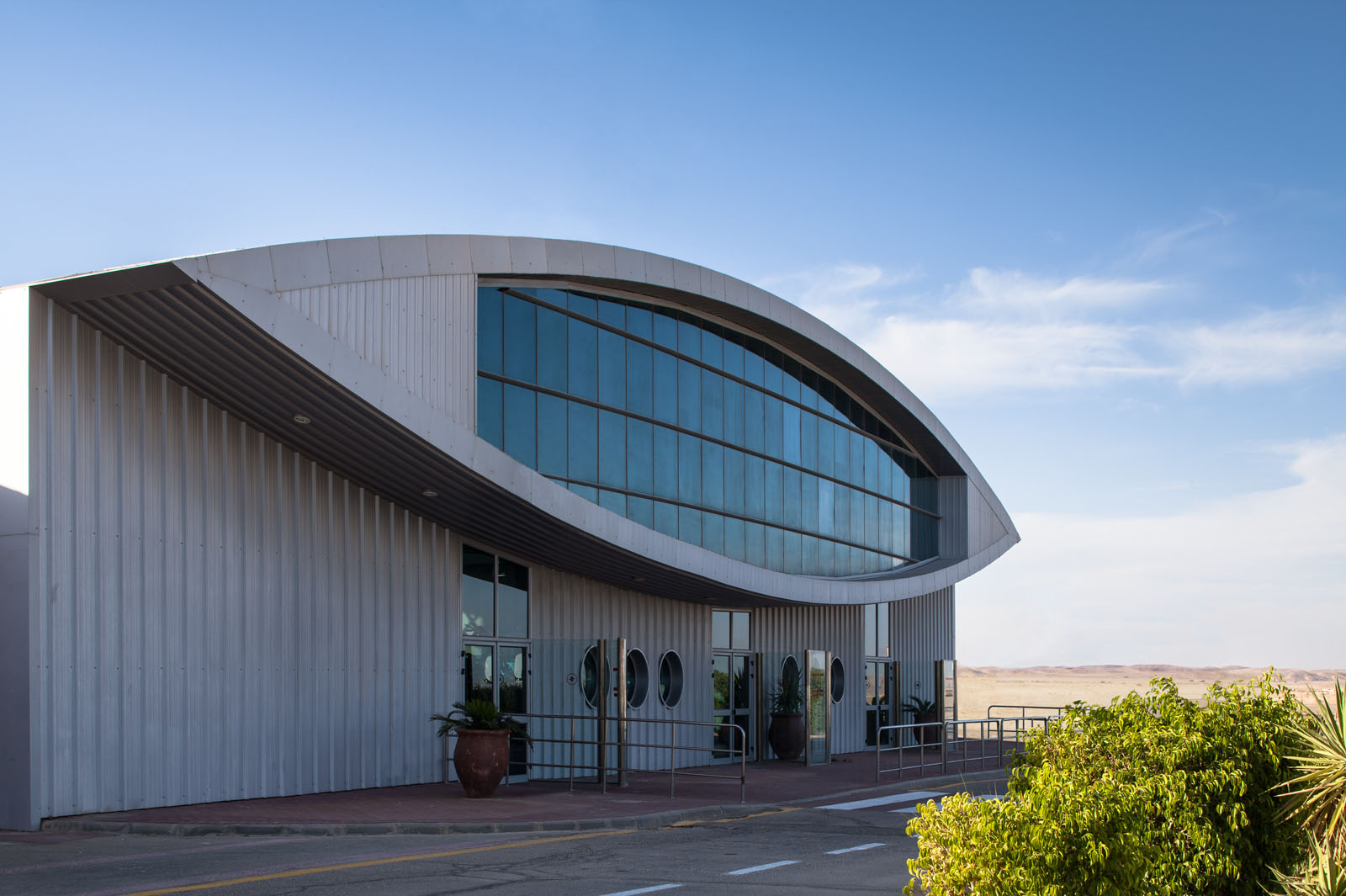
The new terminal of Ovda Airport, which was closed again on 31 March 2019

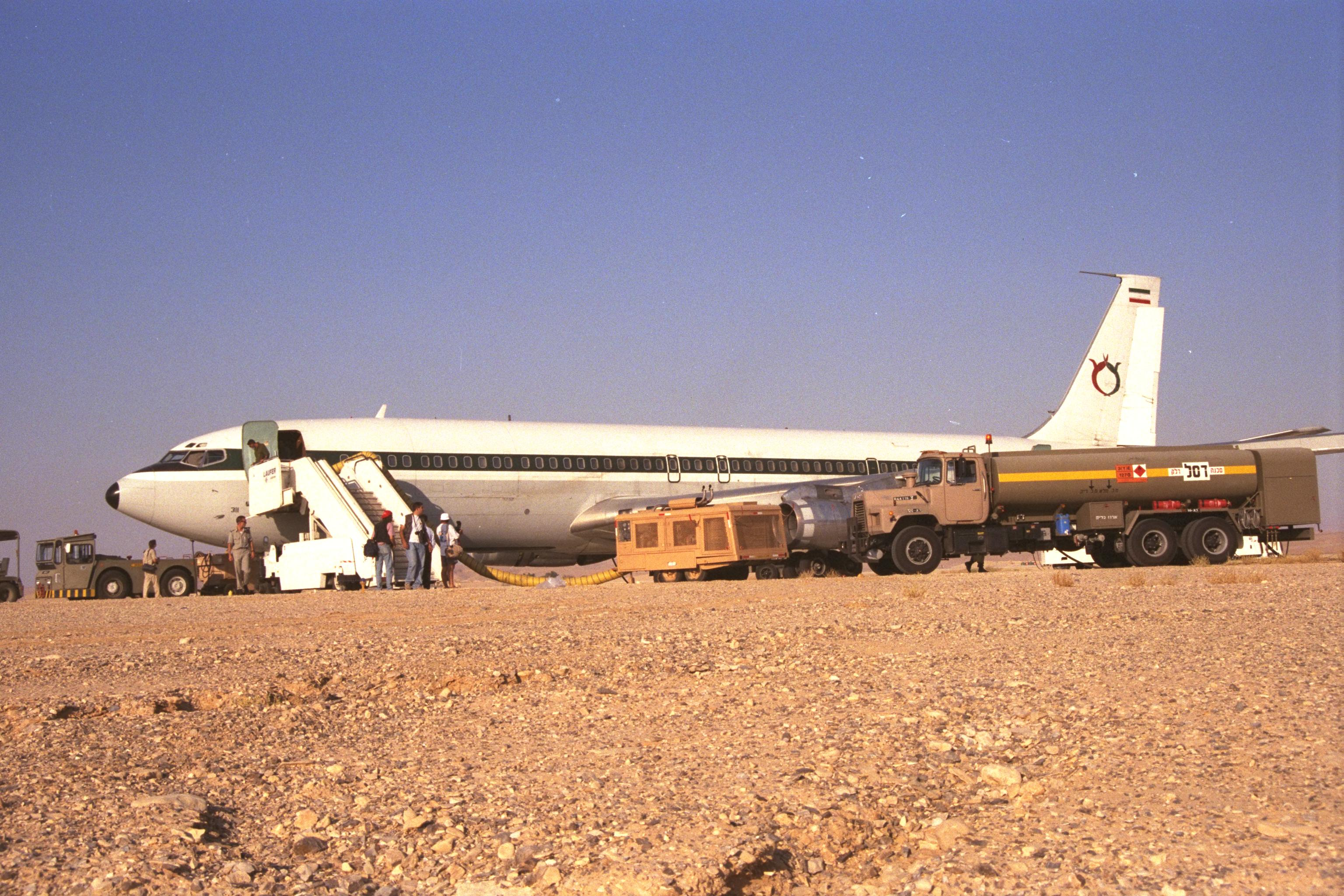
On 19 September 1995 Iranian Kish Air Flight 707 was hijacked by a steward and forced to land on Ovda

On 31 March 2019, the civilian part was closed, because the new Ramon Airport had now gone into operation, which is also much closer to Eilat.

== Aggressor Squadron ==
In March 2005, the 115 Aggressor Squadron "Flying Dragon" was brought back to life on Ovda. At this point it was flying both F-16A/B Netz jets and AH-1 Cobra Tzefa attack helicopters. Their task is or was to simulate enemy jet or helicopter attacks and especially their tactics in order to create the most realistic scenario possible in real combat. The squadron also includes a surface-to-air unit that simulates enemy air defense systems.

The squadron was not intended for operational missions, although the pilots are trained fighter pilots and the jets are operational machines. Similar to the USAF, the squadron also offers this training service to other nations.

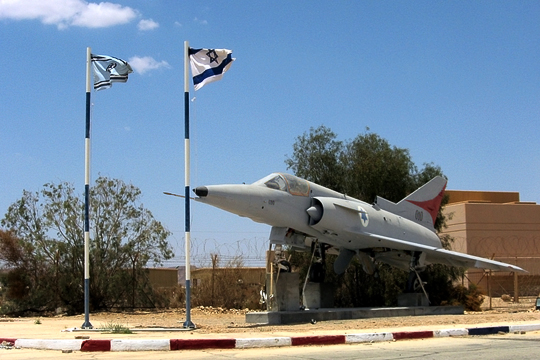
An IAI Kfir C.1 jet from the 1970/80s at the main gate of the airbase

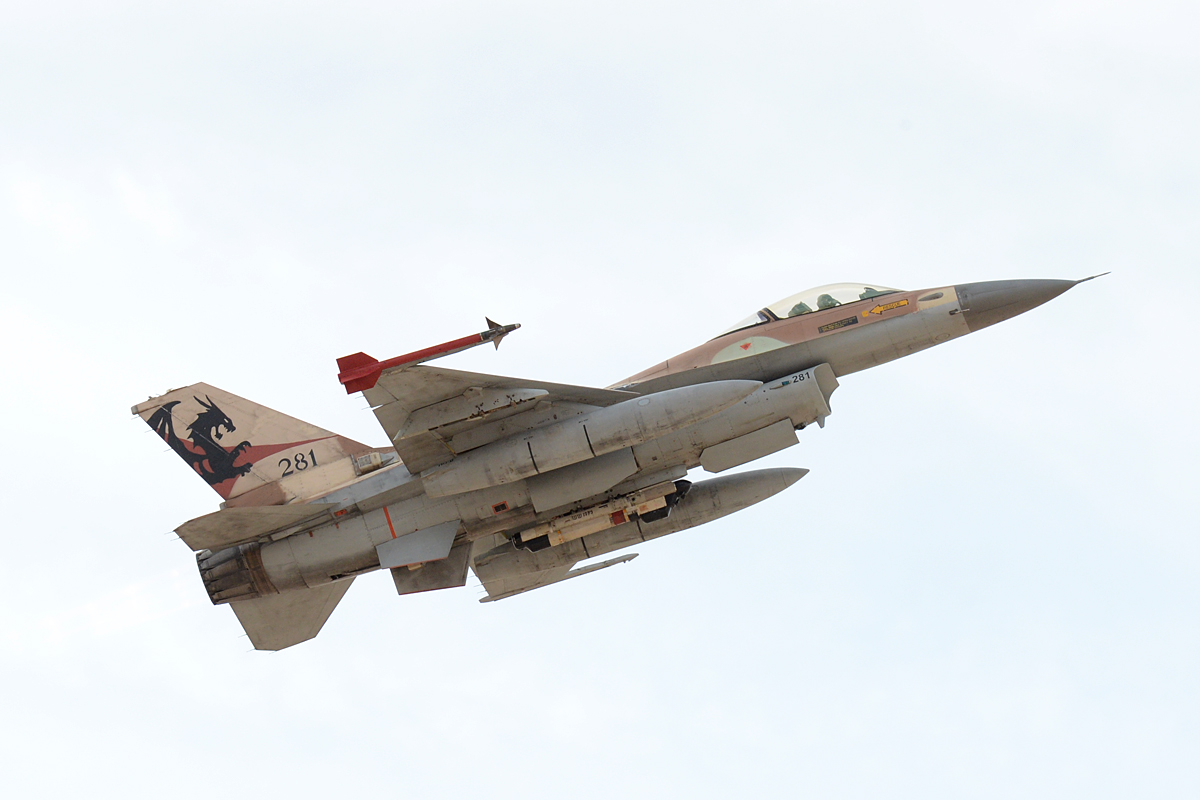
An older F-16A Netz of 115 Squadron "Flying Dragon" in 2013

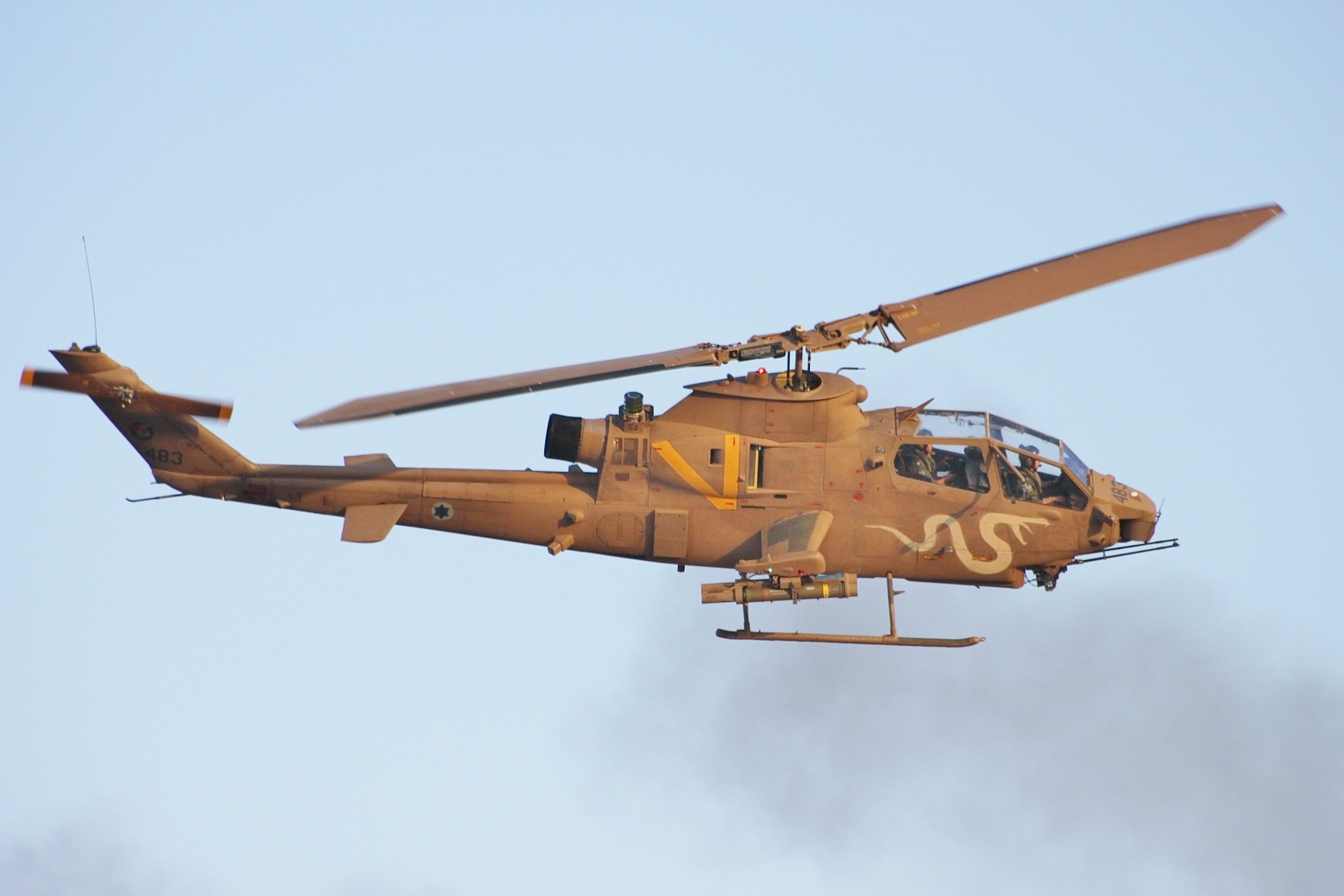
A now retired AH-1 Cobra Tzefa attack helicopter of the IAF

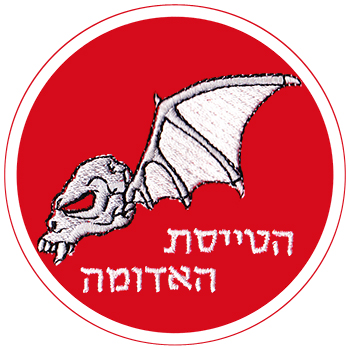
Older badge of 115 Squadron "Flying Dragon"

In 2013, all AH-1 Cobra attack helicopters of the IAF were decommissioned, including those based at Ovda. In April 2017, the Aggressor Squadron's older F-16A/B jets were replaced with newer used F-16C/D Barak.

== Blue Flag ==
Since 2013, the international military aviation exercise Blue Flag has taken place on Ovda every two years in the fall, for which several Western countries send their pilots and fighter jets to Israel, where they undergo intensive training, which also includes the 115 Squadron "Flying Dragon" of the IAF with its role as aggressor. In addition to the air forces directly involved, numerous observers from other countries are also regularly present.

== Today ==
For the first time in its history, the IAF appointed its first female commander of an air force base at Ovda Airbase in March 2024.

In mid-May 2025, the IAF announced that the 115 Squadron "Flying Dragon" at Ovda had been closed down and its jets and personnel transferred to active operational squadrons at other military airbases. The reason given was that this had become necessary due to changes in the combat arenas. In the future, even greater emphasis will be placed on the further development and deployment of simulators in which the IAF will train air combat. The operational squadrons will also take over this task among themselves.

Since there are no longer any fighter jets stationed there, Ovda Airbase currently has sixty empty hardened aircraft shelters (HAS). At the end of August 2025, the base was reopened as a joint training center for air and ground troops. This is the first time that the IDF and IAF have operated a base together. The establishment of this training center was one of the lessons learned from the Hamas attack on 7 October 2023.

When the Houthis began firing rockets from Yemen into Israel after 7 October 2023, a battery of Arrow anti-missiles was relocated to Ovda after the facilities had been modified accordingly. The launch sites are located in the southern part of the airbase (see Google Maps: 29°55′23″N 34°57′13″E).

=== Several US F-22 Raptor deployed to Ovda ===
At the end of February 2026, it was revealed that the USAF had temporarily relocated a total of twelve of its Lockheed Martin F-22 Raptor stealth fighter jets to Ovda Airbase in southern Israel, as it offers enough space and numerous empty hardened aircraft shelters. These aircraft are intended to further enhance the deterrent effect on Iran, in order to pressure it into making concessions during negotiations regarding its nuclear program. Meanwhile, the F-22 Raptor stealth aircraft operating from Ovda have participated in several attacks on Iran since 28 February 2026. In early July 2026, the F-22 stealth jets were withdrawn from Israel, even though the US had just resumed attacks on Iranian targets.

== Units ==
- 115 Aggressor Squadron "Flying Dragon" – operating F-16C/D Barak – closed down in mid-May 2025
- Battery of Arrow missiles (not known whether Arrow 2 or 3)
- IAF Ground Staff School
- IAF Officers' School
- Joint training center for IDF and IAF
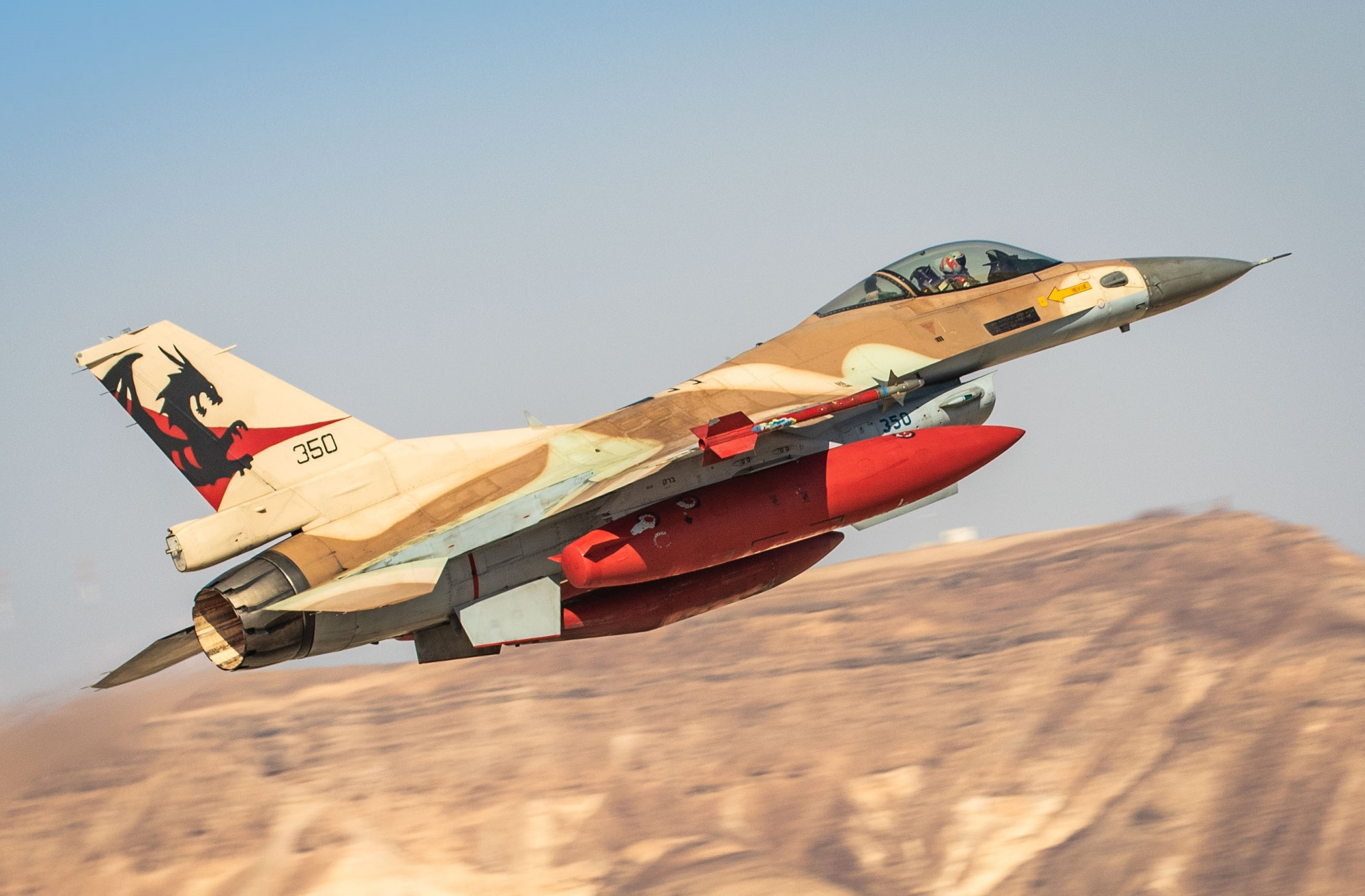
An F-16C Barak of the 115 Aggressor Squadron "Flying Dragon" in January 2021 – squadron is closed

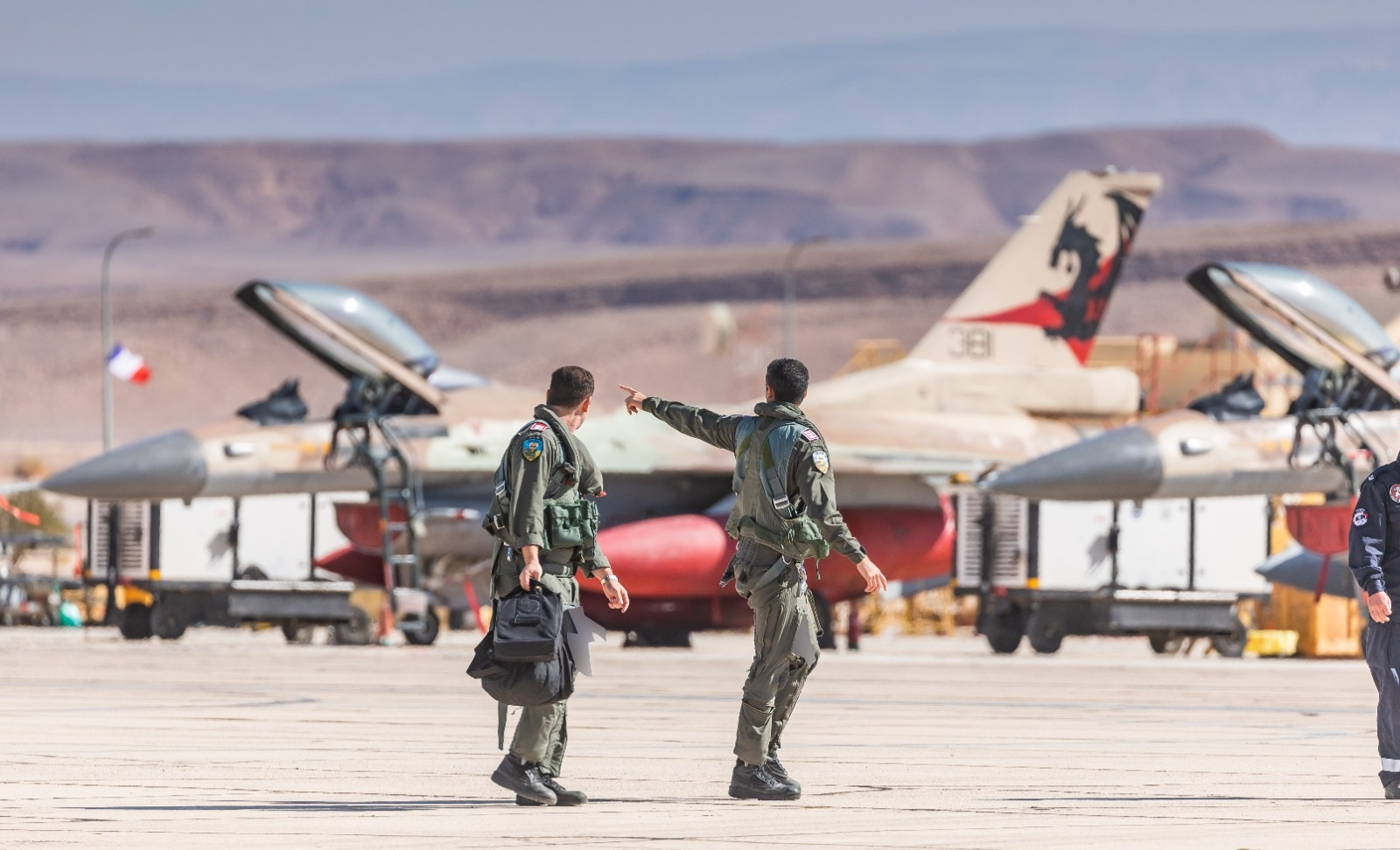
Two Israeli pilots in front of their F-16C jets of 115 Squadron "Flying Dragon" at Ovda in October 2021

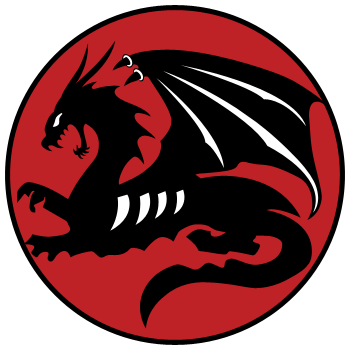
Last badge of 115 Squadron "Flying Dragon"

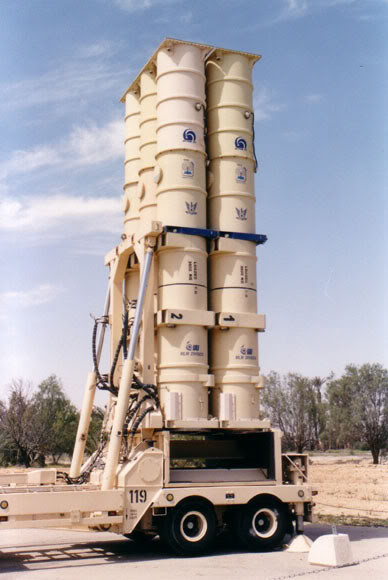
A mobile Arrow 2 launcher

Note: IAF aircraft can usually be assigned to their squadron by the symbols on the tail

== See also ==
- Operation Uvda
