= Giora Romm =

Israeli Air Force general (1945–2023)

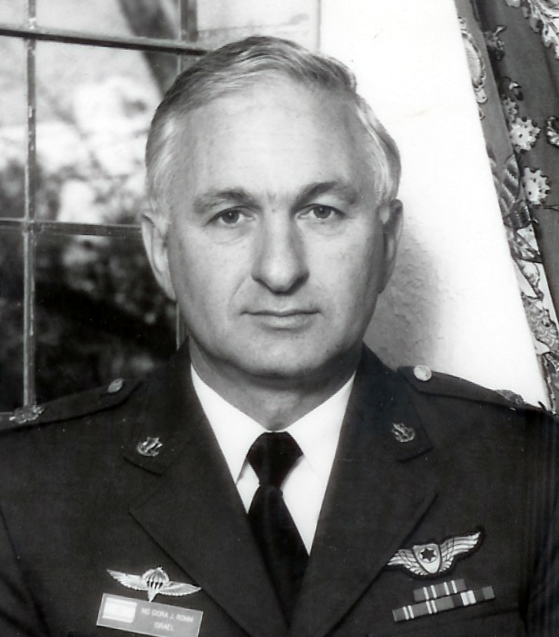
- Romm in 1995
- Native name: גיורא רום
- Born: 29 April 1945; Tel Aviv, Mandatory Palestine
- Died: 11 August 2023 (aged 78)
- Allegiance: Israel
- Branch: Israeli Air Force
- Service years: 1962–1996
- Rank: Major general
- Commands: 115 Squadron; Ramon Airbase; Tel Nof Airbase
- Conflicts: Six-Day War; War of Attrition; Yom Kippur War; First Lebanon War; Operation Wooden Leg
- Other work: Director of the Ministry of National Infrastructure; Director of the Jewish Agency; Director of the Civil Aviation Authority of Israel

Giora Romm (Hebrew: גיורא רום; 29 April 1945 – 11 August 2023) was an Israeli military officer who served as deputy commander of the Israeli Air Force (IAF), Israel's military attaché in the United States and as director of the Civil Aviation Authority of Israel. Romm was the Israeli Air Force's first fighter jet ace, scoring five victories during the 1967 Six-Day War. In 1969, during the War of Attrition, Romm was shot down and spent several months in Egyptian captivity. He commanded the IAF's 115 Squadron through the intensive fighting of the 1973 Yom Kippur War and participated in Operation Wooden Leg, the 1985 raid against PLO headquarters in Tunisia.

== Biography ==
Giora Romm was born in Tel Aviv to Jewish parents. He joined the Israel Defense Forces in 1962 and attended Israeli Air Force flight course 43. Initially flying the Dassault Ouragan and Mystère, Romm later moved to the Dassault Mirage III which he flew with the 119 "Bat" Squadron at Tel Nof. Romm held a B.A. in Economics and Political Science from Bar Ilan University and an MBA from UCLA.

Married to Miriam, he was the father of a daughter and two sons. Romm died of cancer on 11 August 2023, at age 78.

== Aviation career ==
Romm was 22 at the outbreak of the Six-Day War and in the span of three days became the IAF's first jet ace, shooting down five enemy aircraft. When Israel launched operation Focus on 5 June 1967, Romm was one of the few pilots who were not tasked with striking Egyptian air bases, remaining at Tel Nof on quick reaction alert instead. When Israeli Mysteres attacking the air base at Abu Suwayr encountered Egyptian Air Force MiG-21s, Romm and fellow pilot Eitan Karmi were scrambled to the scene. In the ensuing dogfight, each pilot shot down a pair of MiG-21s. That same afternoon, Romm was part of a 119 squadron formation that struck T-4 Syrian Air Force base. Two MiG-21s attempting to defend the base were shot down, one by Romm and the other by Asher Snir.

On 6 June Romm's aircraft was hit by anti-aircraft fire while leading a strike against Syrian positions on the Golan Heights. Suffering a light injury, Romm brought his stricken aircraft to a landing at Ramat David. He was back flying the next day, 7 June, when he scored his final kills of the war. A 119 squadron three-ship formation was vectored to intercept Egyptian MiG-17s attacking Israel forces in the Sinai and Romm shot down two to become the IAF's first jet ace. Although other aces had served with the IAF before, Romm was also the first to score all five kills while flying for the IAF (as opposed to pilots who had scored while flying with allied air forces in WWII). A Segen (lieutenant) at the time, IAF commander Mordechai Hod incorrectly addressed Romm as a Seren (captain) at a victory dinner several weeks after the war. At the instigation of his fellow pilots, Hod promptly promoted Romm to the rank.

=== War of Attrition and captivity ===
By 1969 Romm was slated to convert to the F-4 Phantom. In September 1969, however, he was shot down and captured by the Egyptians. On 9 September the IDF had carried out Operation Raviv, a mounted raid into Egyptian territory, and on 11 September Egypt responded with a large air raid on Israeli positions in the Sinai. Scrambled to the scene, Romm was pursuing a pair of MiG-21s when he was hit by another MiG he had failed to spot, reportedly flown by Major Fawzi Salama. Romm bailed out of his Mirage and landed in the Egyptian Delta, suffering multiple injuries. Denied proper medical attention, he was held at a prison at Abbassia, near Cairo, where he was repeatedly beaten and tortured. On 5 December, after three months in captivity, Romm and fellow pilot Nissim Ashkenazi were released in a prisoner exchange. Hospitalized for 4 months, he was able to return to flying, and was eventually assigned command of an IAF flight school squadron.

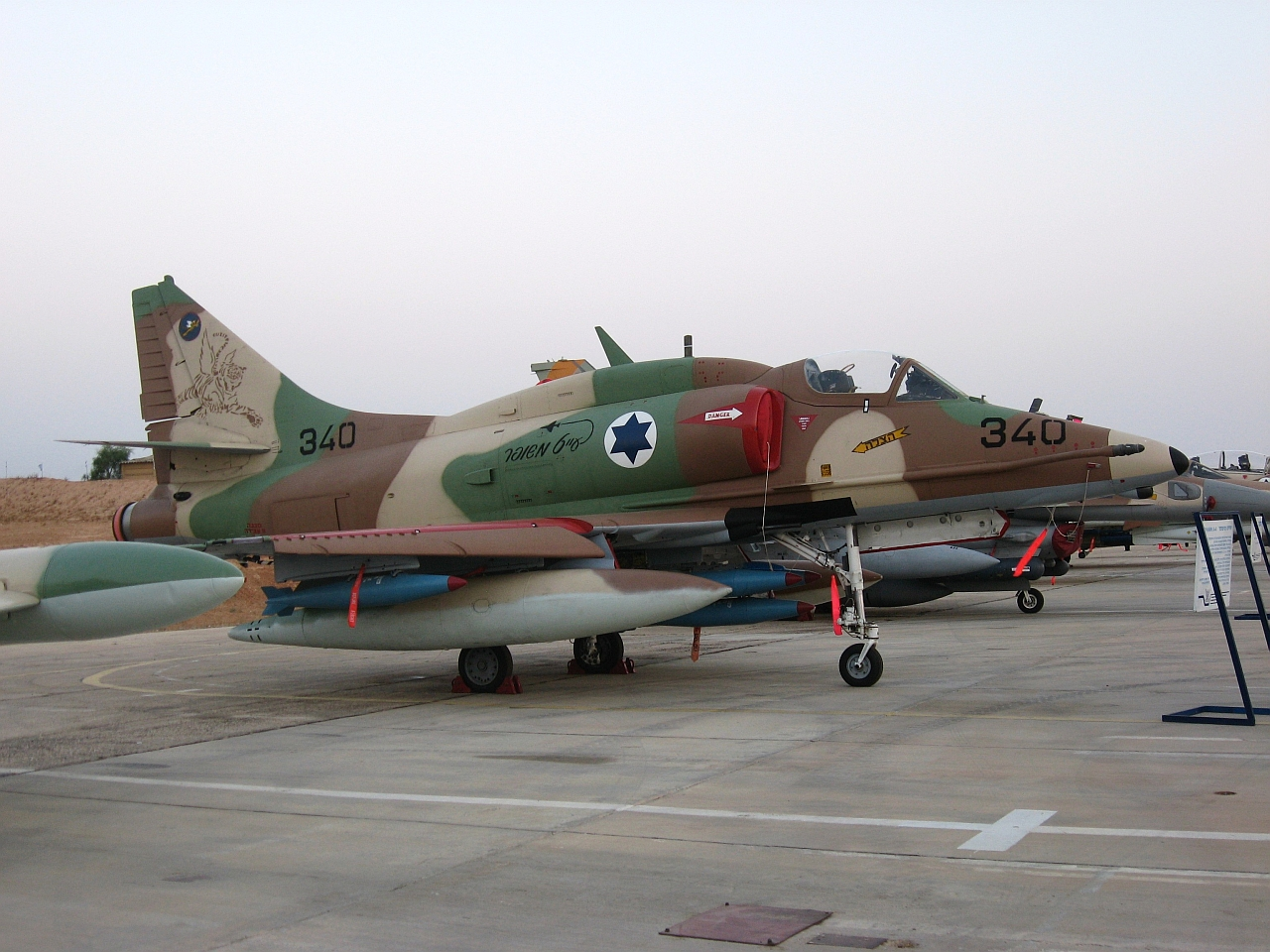
Israeli Air Force A-4 Skyhawk

On 3 October 1973, 115 Squadron lost its commanding officer, Ami Gadish, when his A-4 Skyhawk crashed during a training sortie. On Friday, 5 October, Romm took command of the squadron, despite having never flown the Skyhawk nor served with the unit. The Yom Kippur War broke out the very next day, and Romm's first flight was a combat sortie targeting Egyptian troops crossing the Suez Canal. Romm familiarized himself with the aircraft en route to the target. He later described the sortie:

Reserve pilot Uri Bina was section leader. He called "Three pulls" over the radio and I pulled with him into a pop-up manoeuvre for the first time in my life in a Skyhawk. I rolled onto my back at 6000 ft and dove. The yellow glow of an SA-2 missile came toward me from Port Said, at which point I thought to myself "is the whole world against me today?" I tried to execute the attack and rejoin Uri Bina. "Four, your bombs didn't release" Uri called. I returned to the initial point before heading back to the target once again, this time alone.

The squadron was eventually to fly 750 sorties throughout the war, losing 7 aircraft. 5 pilots were killed and 2 made prisoners of war.

Romm commanded 115 Squadron until 1976, when he was appointed head of the research department at Lamdan, the IAF's Air Intelligence Directorate. In 1980 he was assigned command of the new airbase constructed at Ramon, and in 1984 went on to command Tel Nof, largest of all IAF bases. As commander of Tel Nof, in 1985 he participated in Operation Wooden Leg, flying one of the F-15 Eagles that struck PLO headquarters in Tunisia.

In 1987 Romm became the deputy to the head of the IDF Operations Directorate and in 1987 deputy IAF commander, a role he played during the 1991 Gulf War. Shortly after the war he was promoted to major general and appointed Israeli Defense attaché in the United States. Returning to Israel, he retired from military service in early 1996.

== Public service career ==
Upon leaving the military, Romm was appointed director of the Ministry of National Infrastructure, under then-minister Ariel Sharon. He later entered the private sector and from September 2001 served as the director general of the Jewish Agency for Israel. In 2008 he was appointed director of the Civil Aviation Authority of Israel and resigned in 2014.

Romm served as a senior researcher at the Institute for National Security Studies, and from 2005 was chairman of Metzilah, the "Center for Zionist, Jewish, Liberal and Humanist Thought."

== Published works ==
In 2008 Romm published his book, Tzivony Arba ("Tulip Four", published in 2014 in the USA under the title Solitary), for which he won the 2009 Yitzhak Sadeh Prize for military literature.

== See also ==
- Lists of flying aces in Arab–Israeli wars
