= 117 Squadron (Israel) =

Israeli military unit

- טייסת הסילון הראשונה
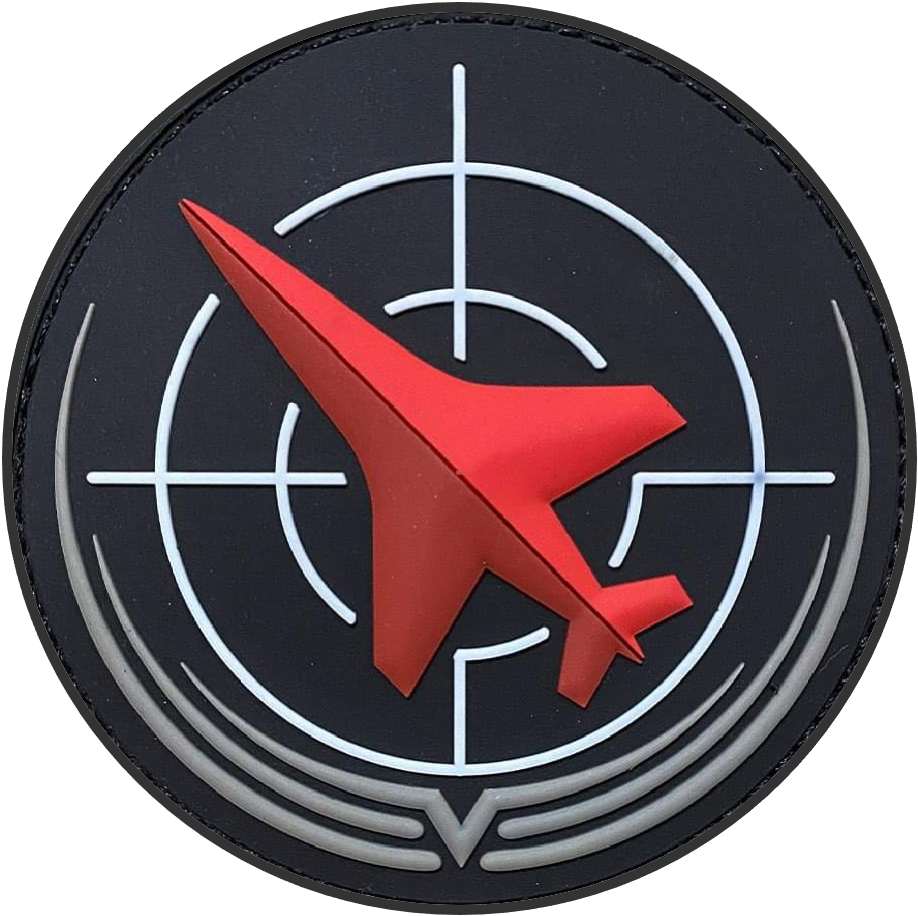
- First Jet Squadron
- Active: 1953-2020; 2021-
- Disbanded: September 2020 - as active Air Defense squadron; reestablished July 2021 as training squadron
- Country: Israel
- Branch: Israeli Air Force
- Role: F-35I training (2021-); Air Defense (1953-2020)
- Garrison/HQ: Nevatim Airbase (2021-); Ramat David Airbase (1953-2020)

Aircraft flown
- Fighter: F-35I (current); F-16C and Mirage IIICJ (previous); Meteor F.8 (first)

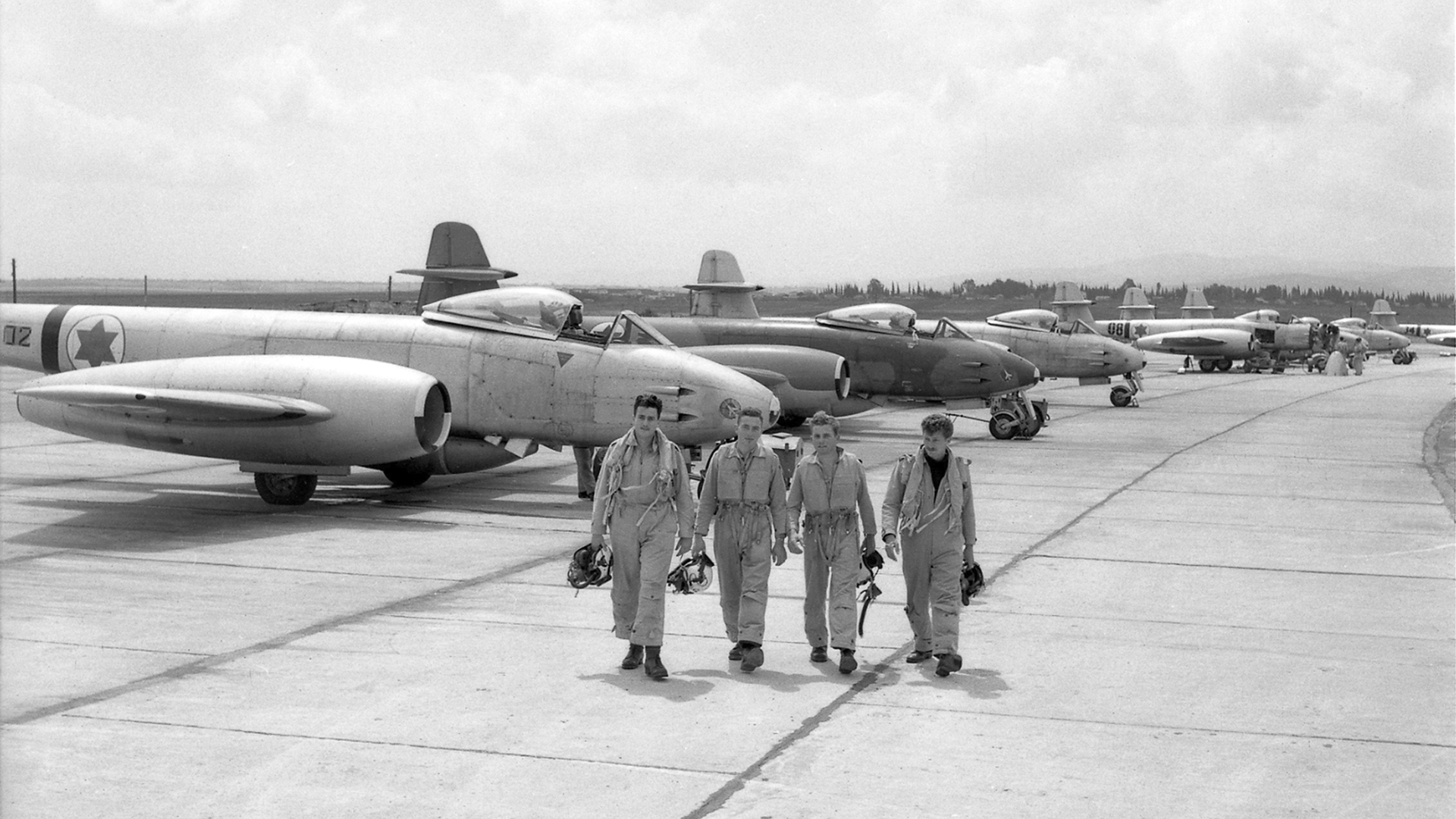
Four Israeli fighter pilots walking in front of their Gloster Meteor F.8 jets of 117 Squadron "First Jet" in 1953 or somewhat later at Ramat David Airbase

The 117 Squadron of the Israeli Air Force (IAF), also known as the First Jet Squadron, is initially a training squadron for F-35I Adir fighter pilots, based at Nevatim Airbase.

== History ==
Before it closed in September 2020 after 67 years of service, the 117th was an F-16C fighter squadron based at Ramat David Airbase. The squadron began there on 17 June 1953 and operated Israel's first jet fighter, the Gloster Meteor, flying the T.7 (two-seat trainer), F.8 (fighter) and FR.9 (reconnaissance) variants.

In July 2021, Airforce Technology reported that the Israeli Air Force had re-established the 117 Squadron "First Jet" as a training squadron in the IAF's F-35I Adir division, based at Nevatim Airbase in the Negev. It will become an operational squadron as soon as there are enough jets arrived from the US.

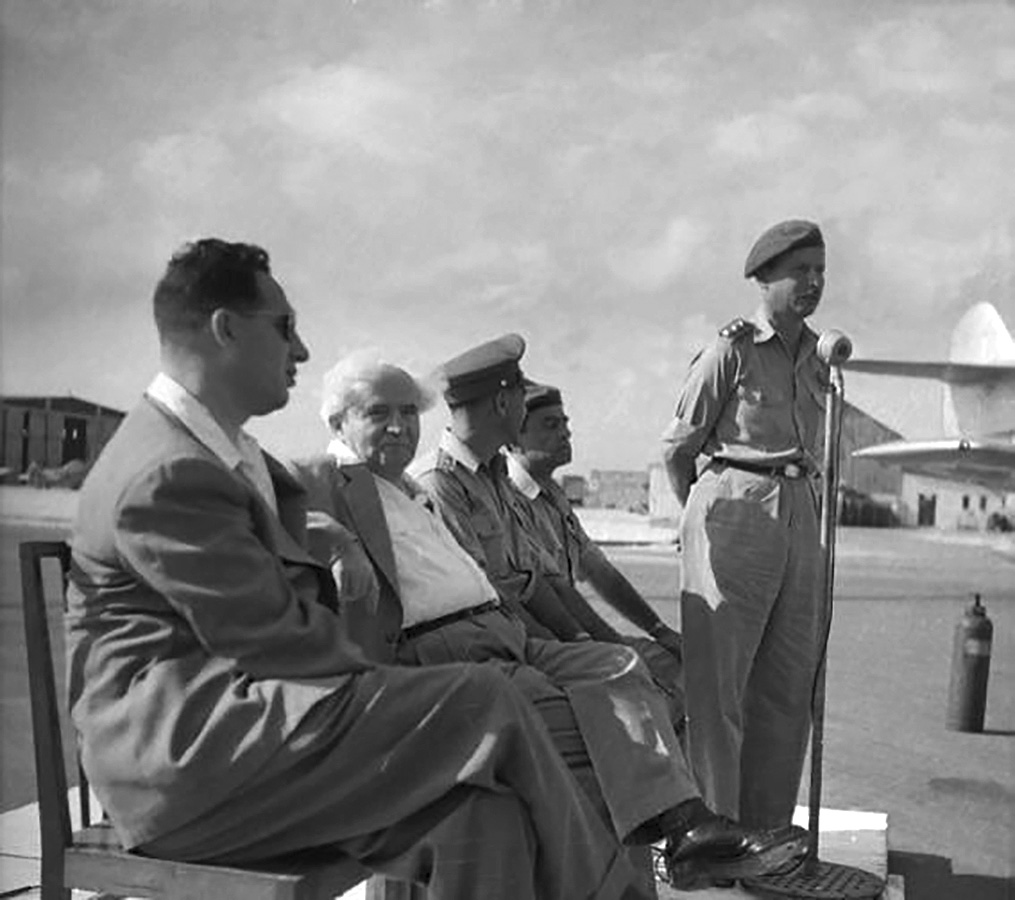
Opening ceremony of the then new 117 Squadron on 17 June 1953 at Ramat David Airbase

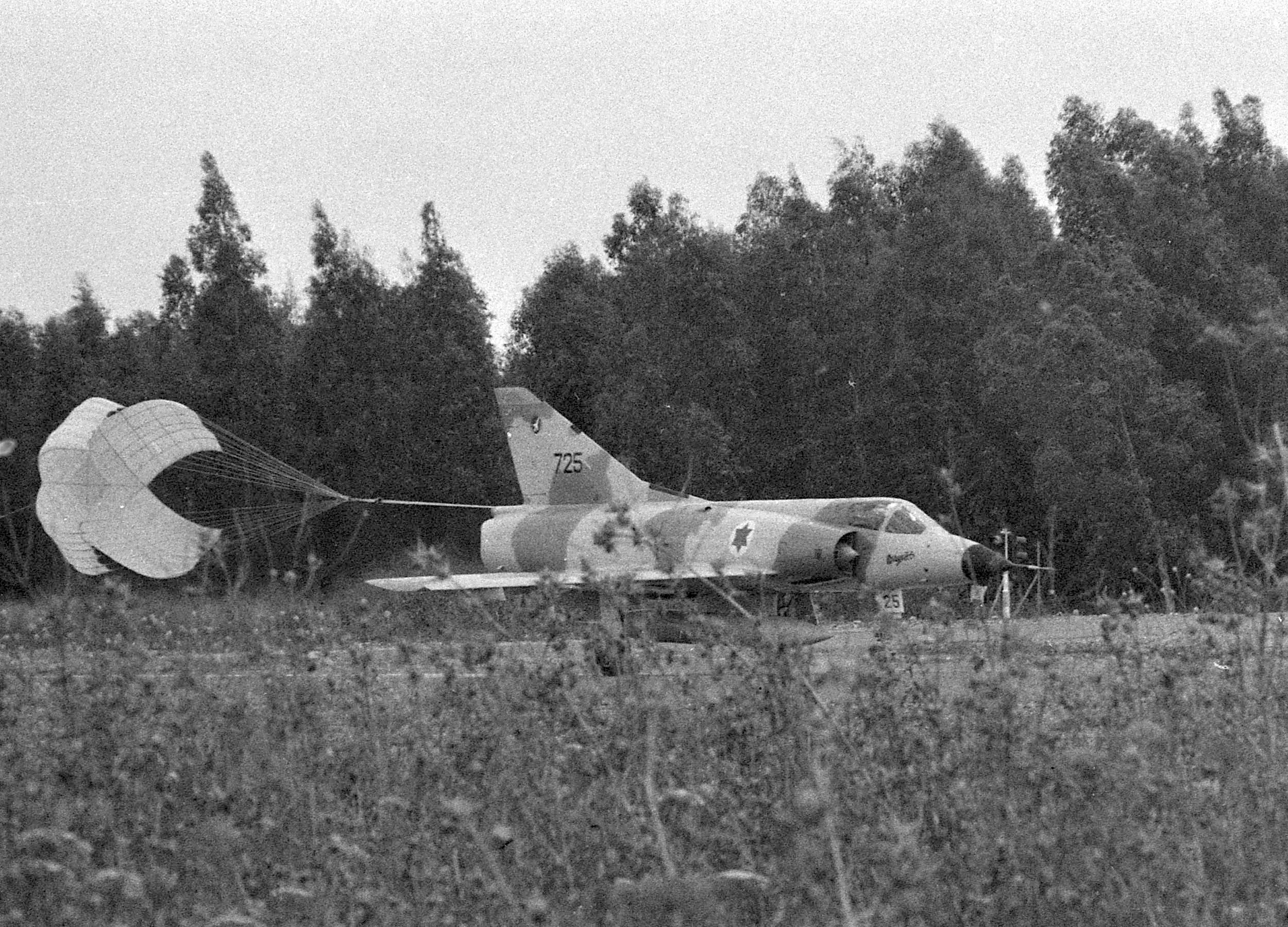
A Dassault Mirage IIICJ Shahak of 117 Squadron "First Jet" is landing at Ramat David Airbase in 1970

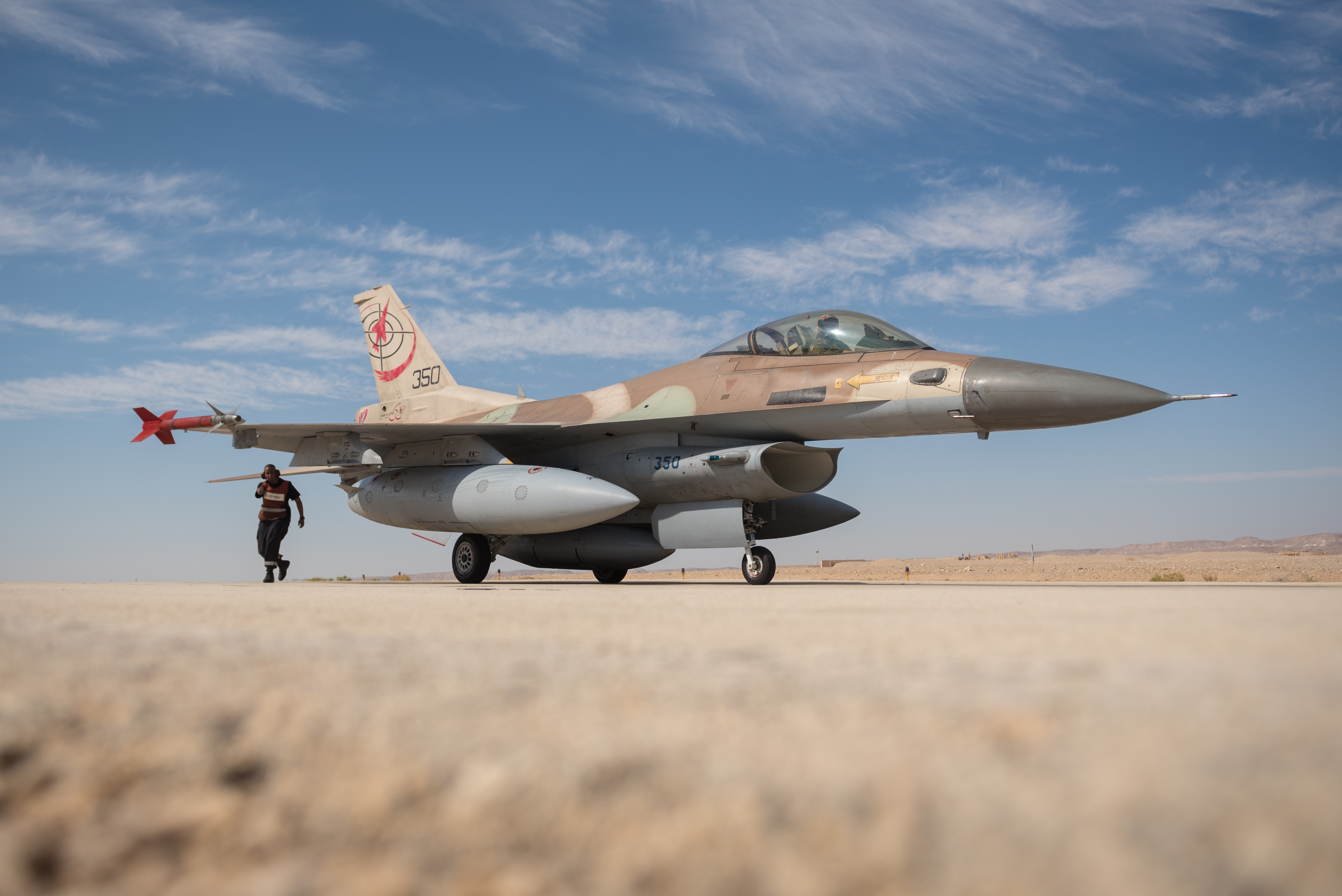
An F-16C Barak from the 117 Squadron "First Jet" at Blue Flag in 2017, disbanded at Ramat David in 2020

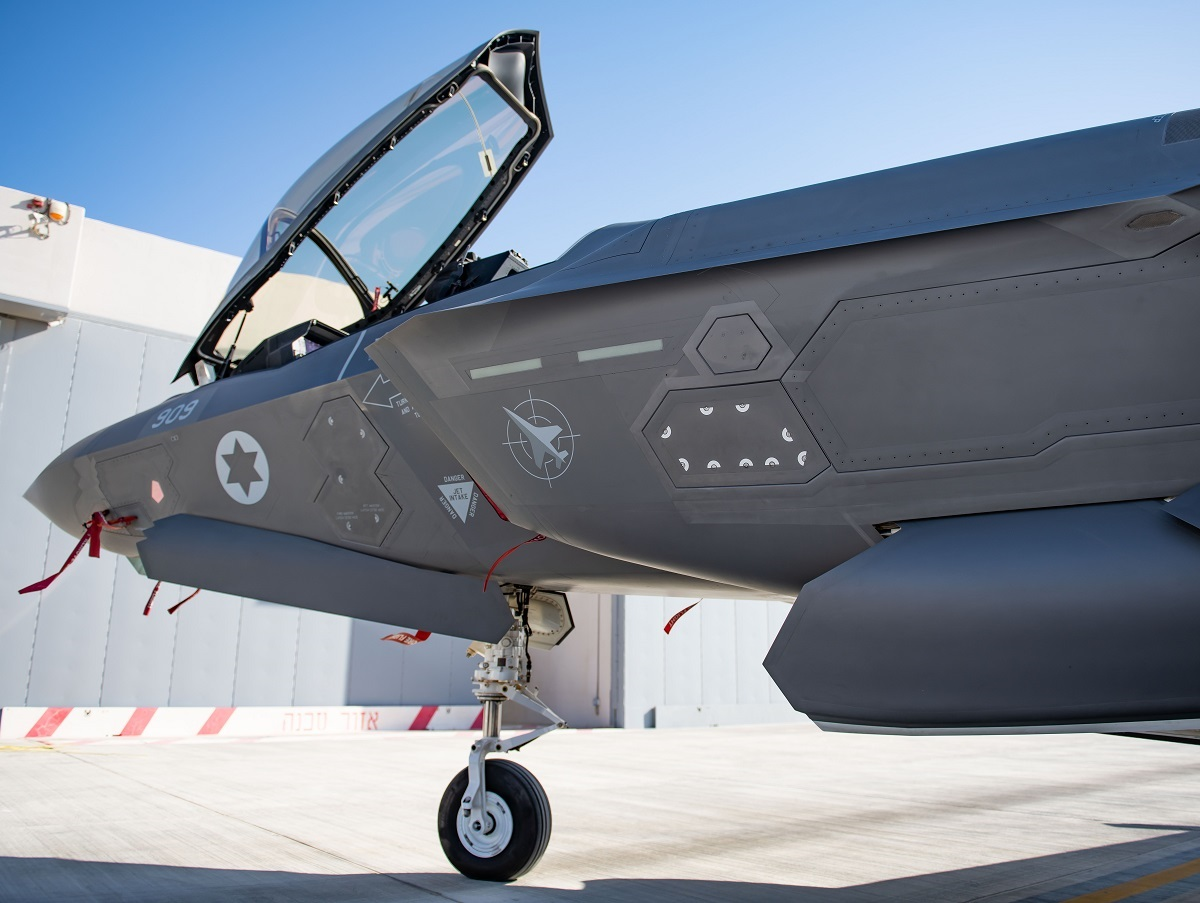
The reopening of the 117 Squadron on 1 July 2021 at Nevatim Airbase with F-35I Adir jets
