= Blue Flag (Israeli Air Force exercise) =

Biennial military aviation exercise

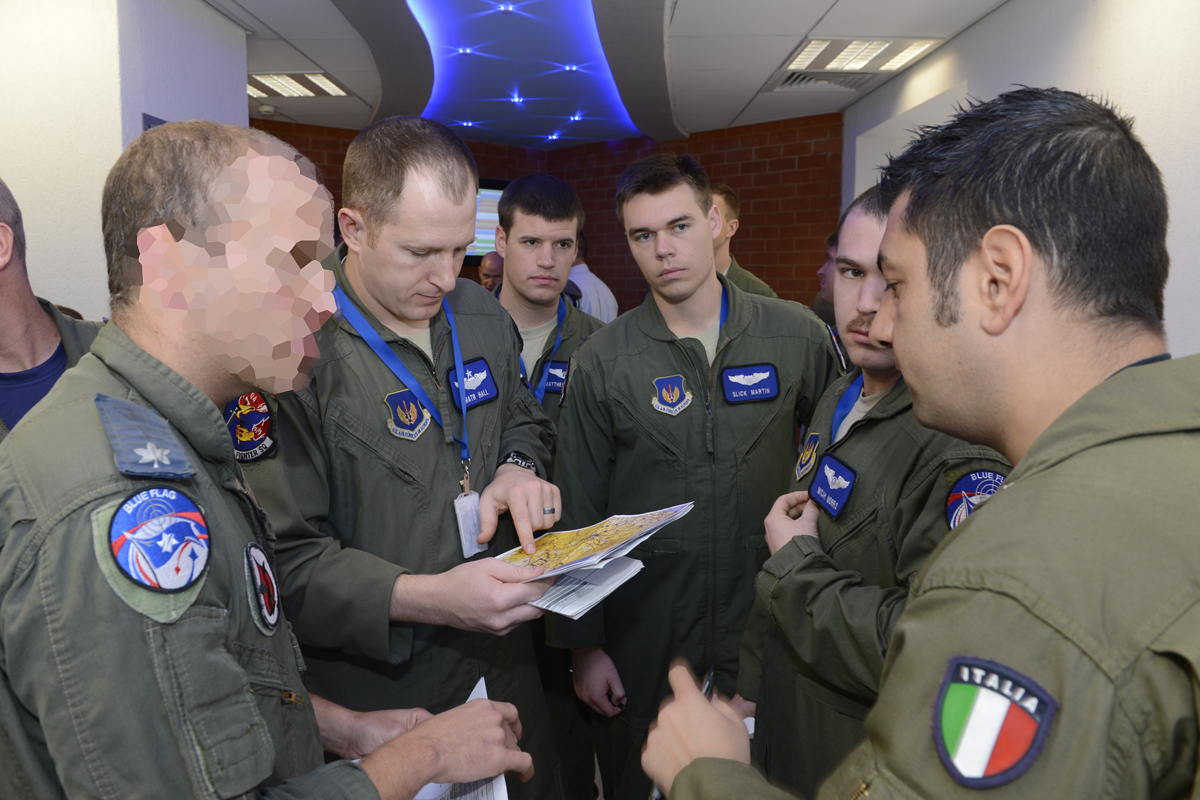
American, Italian and Israeli pilots at Blue Flag 2013

Blue Flag is an international military aviation exercise held by the Israeli Air Force (IAF). It first took place in November 2013 at Ovda Airbase in Israel. The exercise, which included the participation of several foreign air forces, is aimed at expanding international cooperation. Plans on making Blue Flag (named after the IAF's ensign) a biennial event were realised in 2015 with another Blue Flag exercise in which the air forces of the United States, Greece and Poland also participated. The goal of the Blue Flag training exercise is to simulate extreme combat scenarios and coalition flights as realistically as possible.

In 2017 the exercise hosted air forces from the United States of America, Poland, Italy and Greece – and for the first time India, France and Germany participated as well.

The Royal Air Force of the United Kingdom took part in Blue Flag 2021, which was the first time they have openly trained in Israeli airspace.

In 2023, Blue Flag was canceled due to the Gaza war.

== Gallery ==
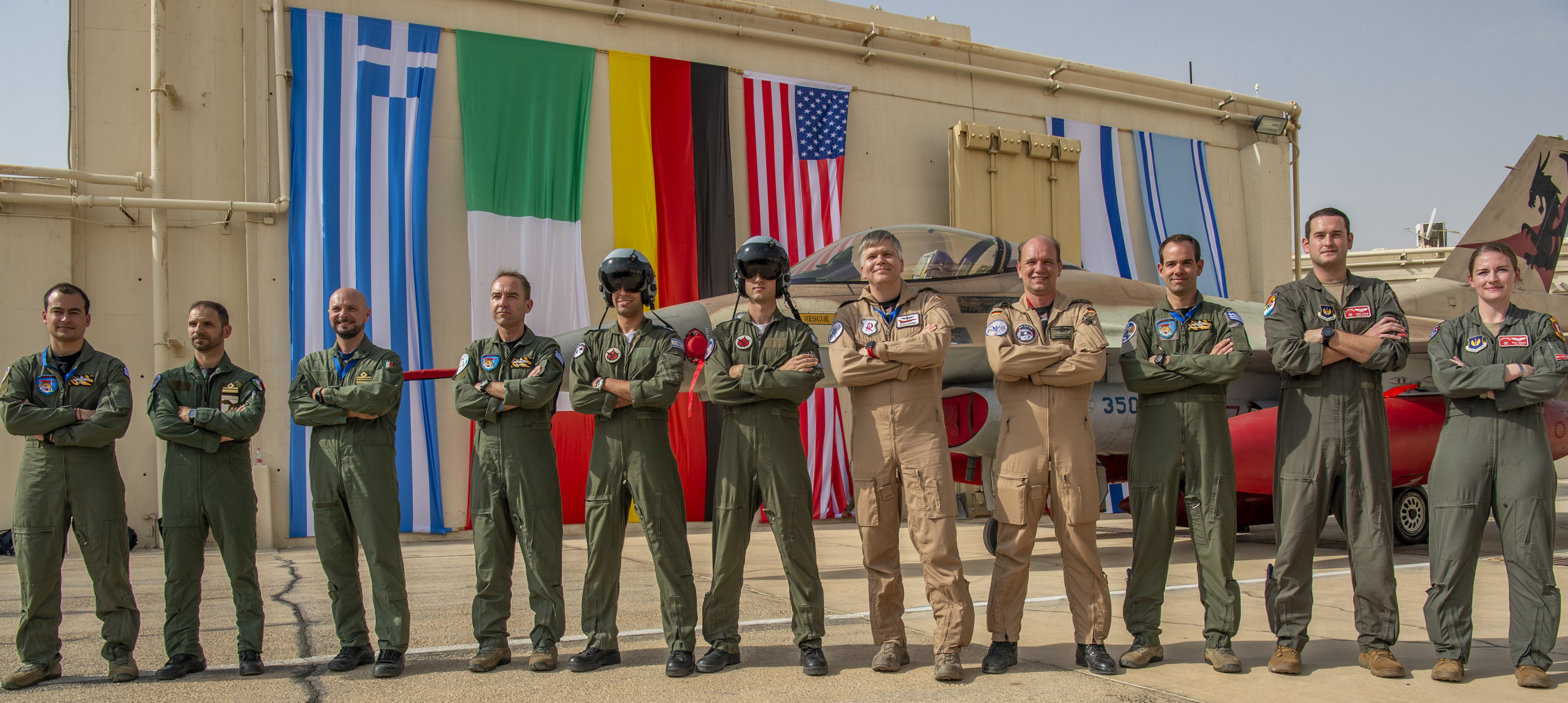
The ground crews from different countries during Blue Flag 2019

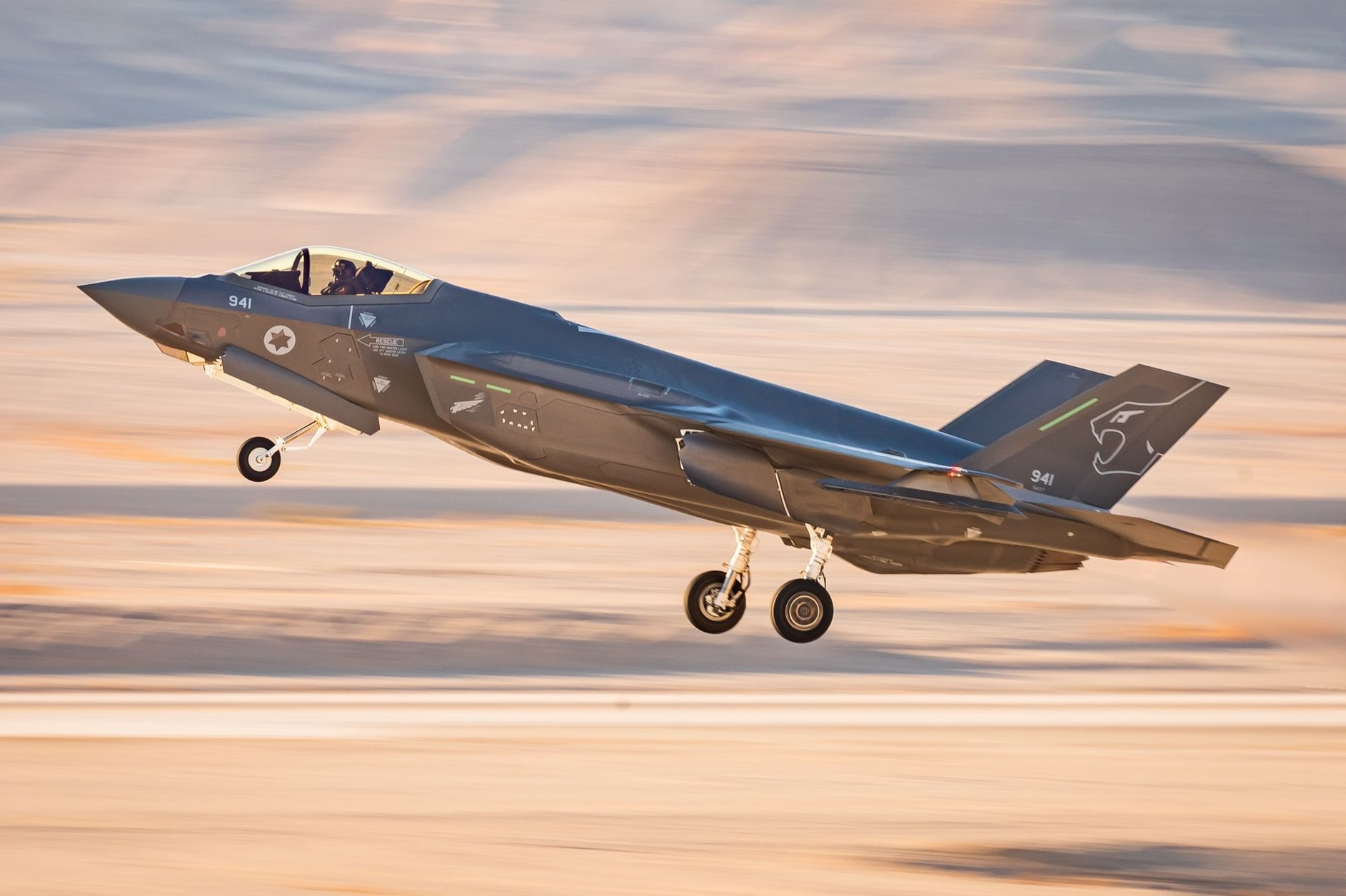
An F-35I Adir of the IAF is taking off at Ovda Airbase during Blue Flag 2021

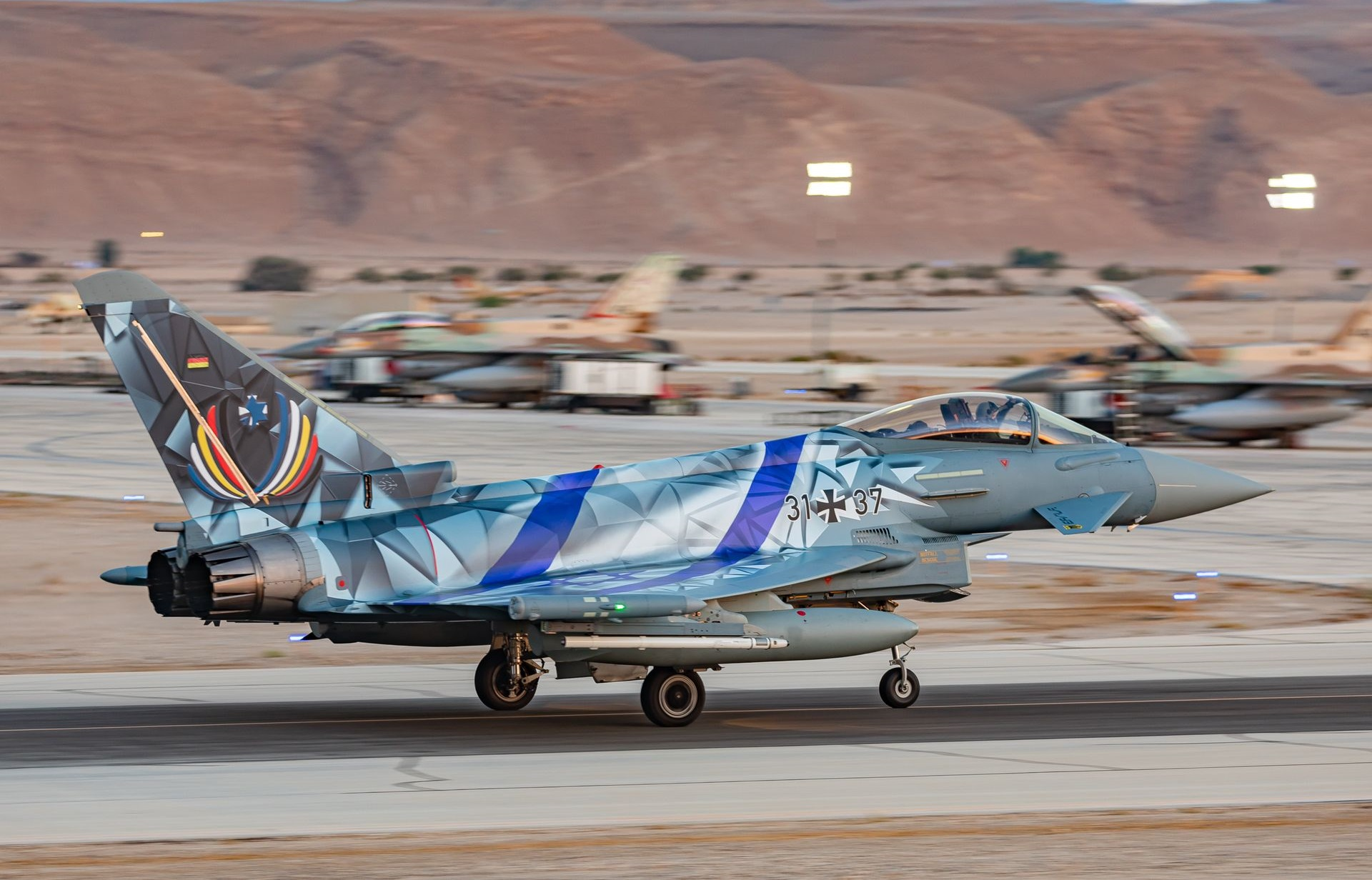
A Eurofighter of the German Air Force with special painting at Ovda during Blue Flag 2021

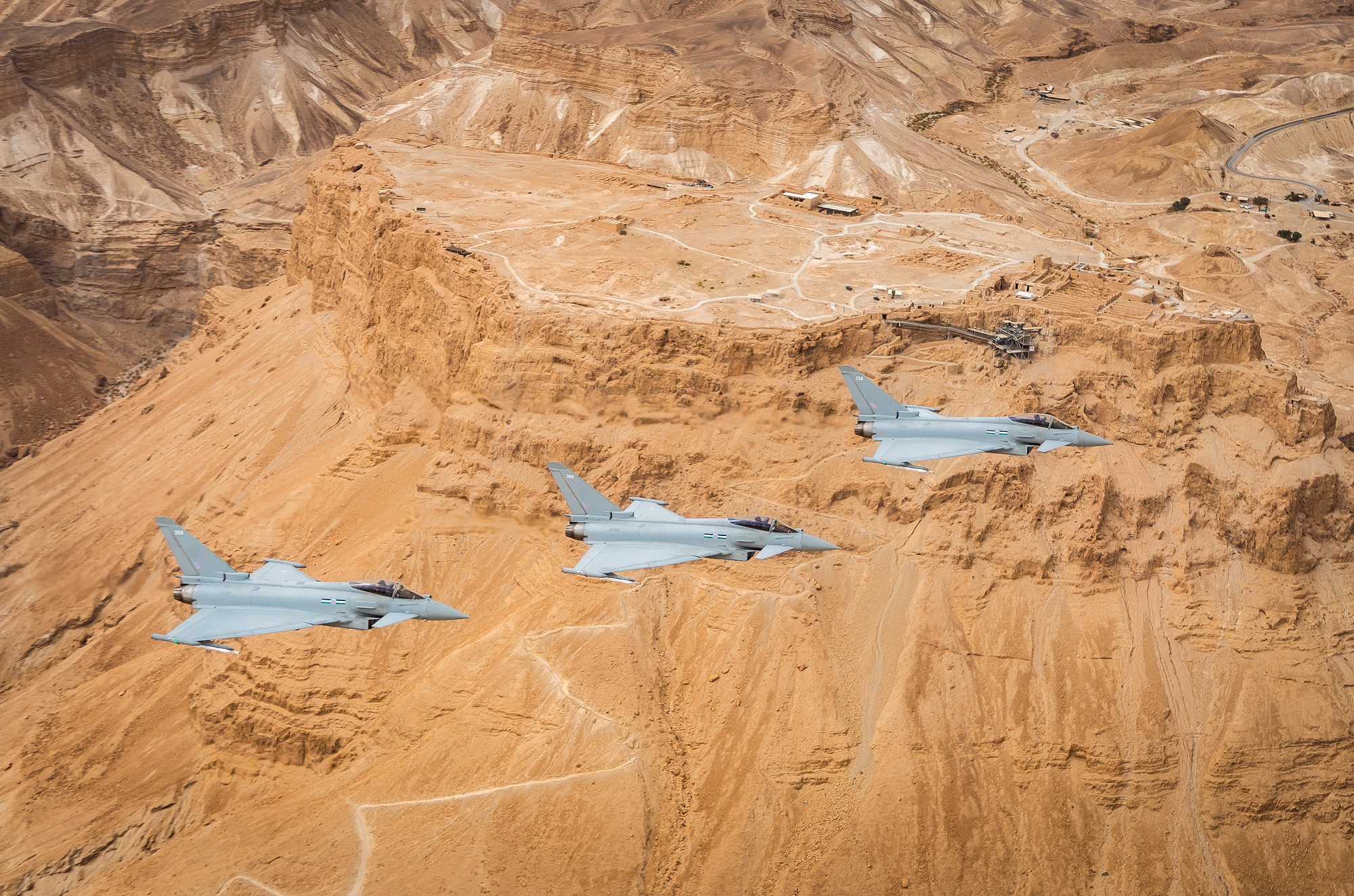
Eurofighter of the Royal Air Force in front of the Masada Fortress during Blue Flag 2021

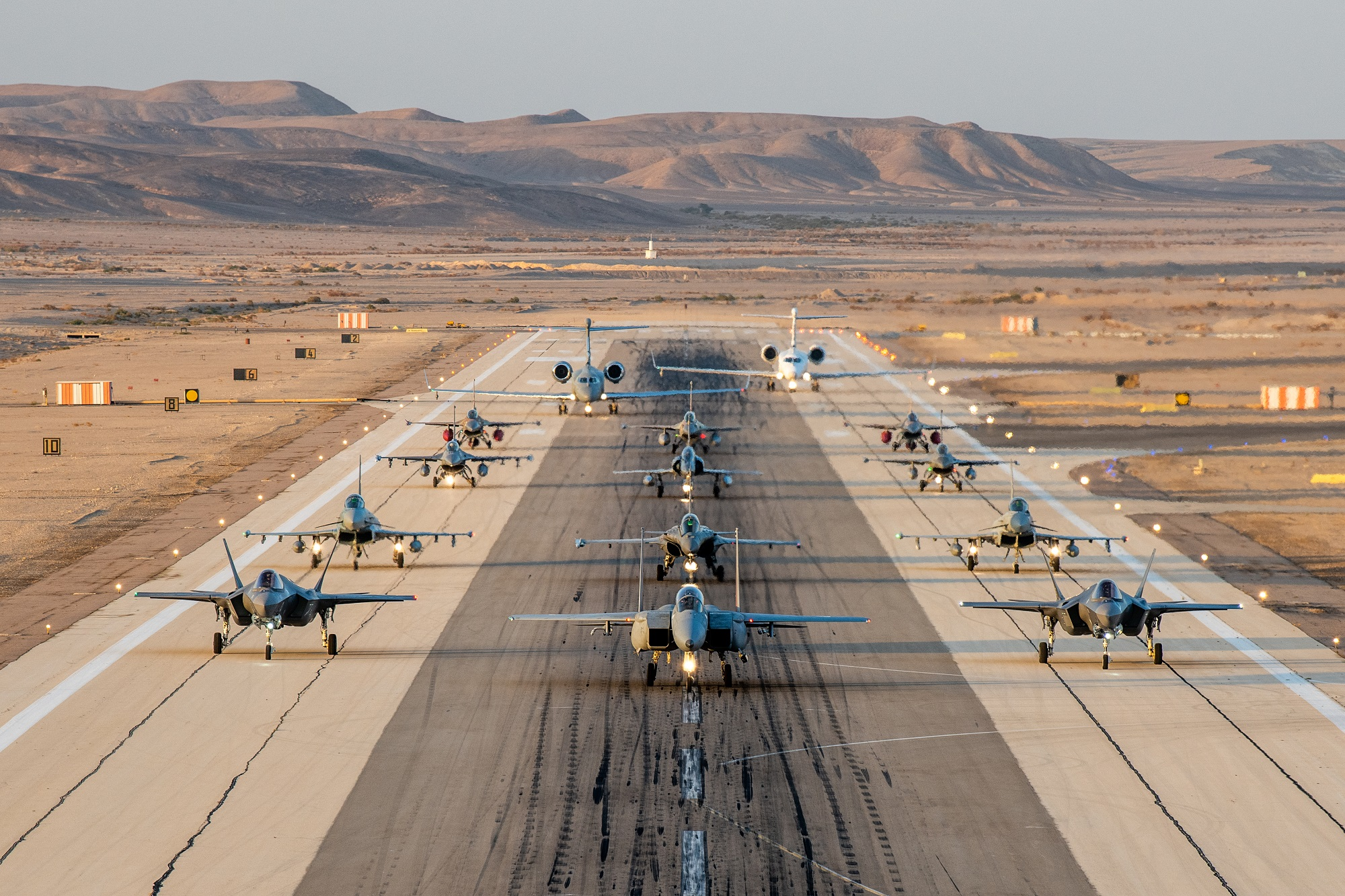
An "Elephant Walk" on the runway in Ovda during Blue Flag 2021

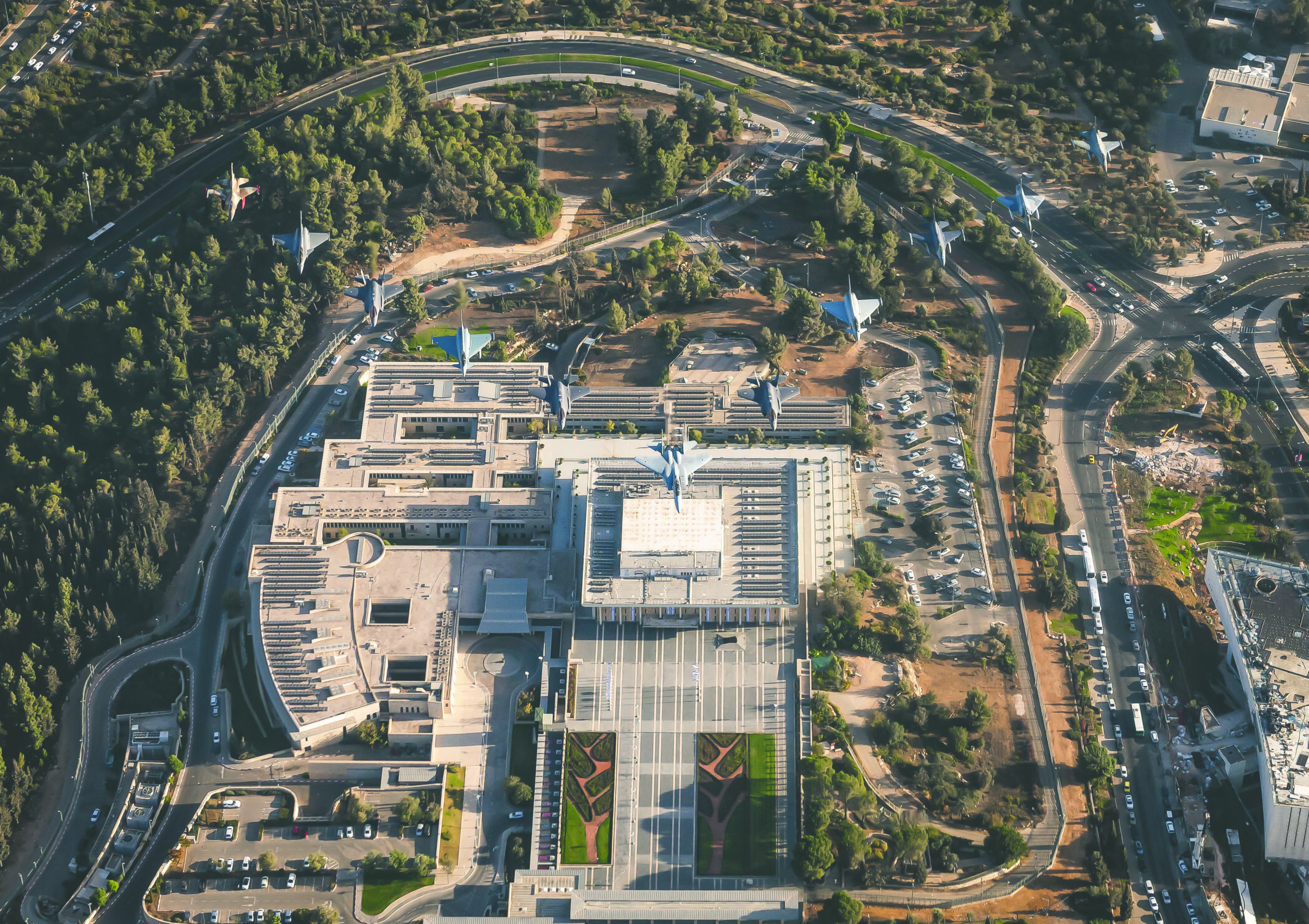
Joint overflight of the Knesset in Jerusalem during Blue Flag 2021
