= Kish Air Flight 707 =

1995 aircraft hijacking

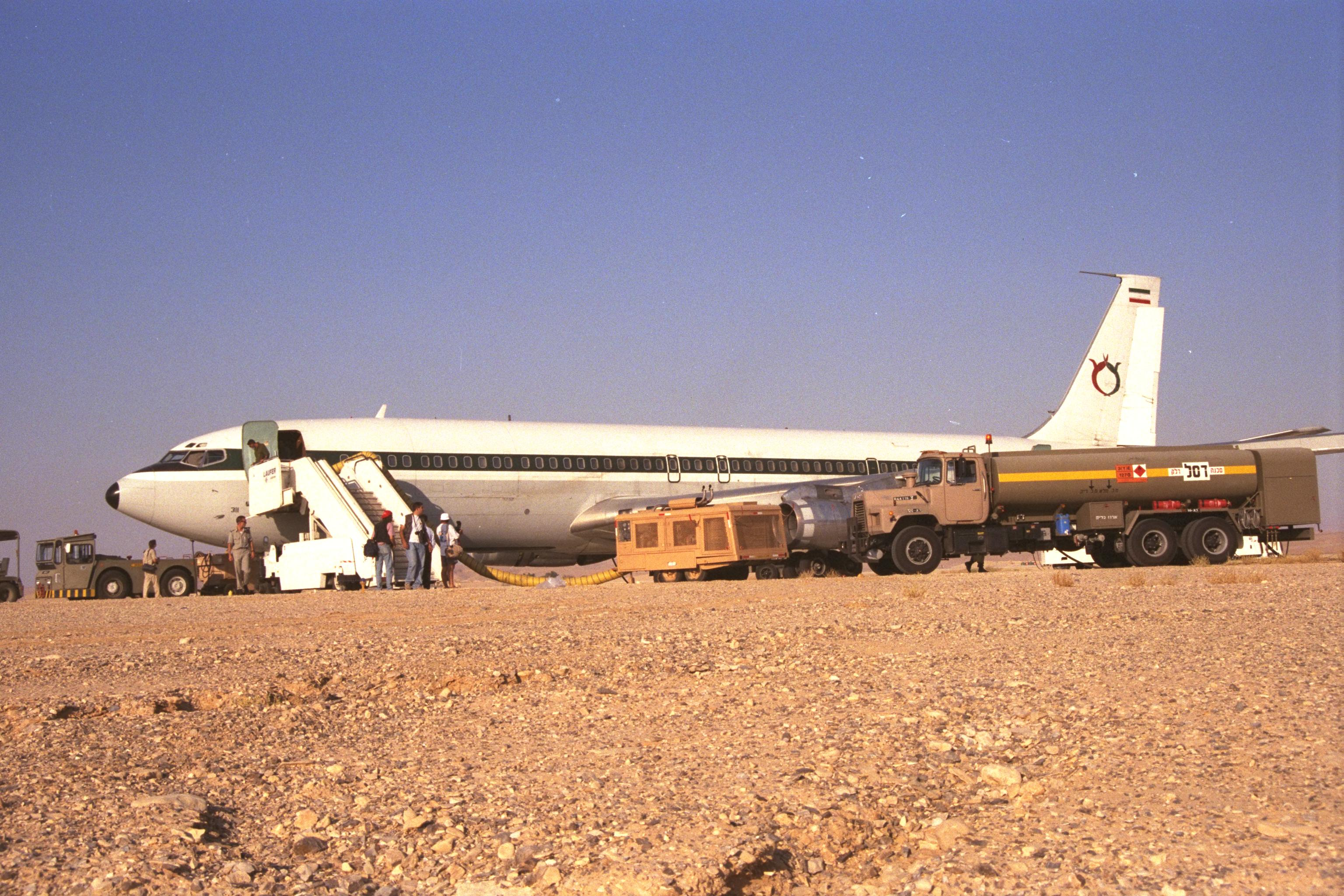
- The Boeing 707 after the forced landing

Hijacking
- Date: 19 September 1995
- Summary: Hijacking by a disgruntled flight attendant
- Site: Ovda Airbase, Negev Desert, Israel

Aircraft
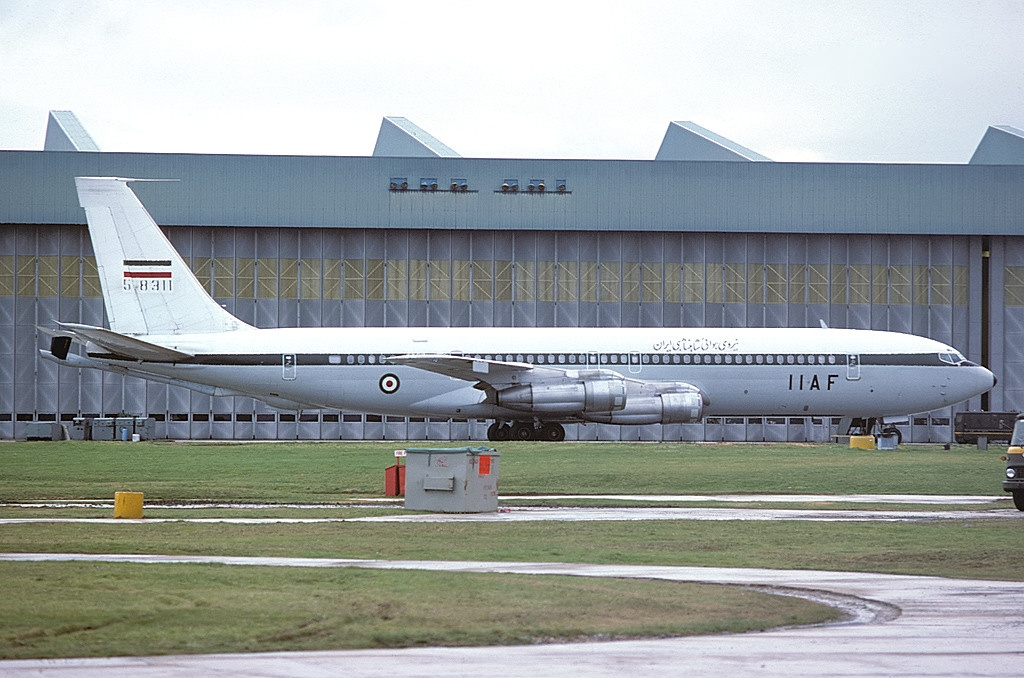
- The aircraft involved in the hijacking, in 1978 while in service with the Imperial Iranian Air Force during Pahlavi dynasty era
- Aircraft type: Boeing 707-3J9C
- Operator: Kish Air
- IATA flight No.: Y9707
- ICAO flight No.: KIS707
- Call sign: KISH AIR 707
- Registration: EP-SHE
- Flight origin: Mehrabad International Airport, Tehran, Iran
- Destination: Kish International Airport, Kish Island, Iran
- Occupants: 174
- Passengers: 162
- Crew: 12
- Fatalities: 0
- Injuries: 0
- Survivors: 174

Kish Air Flight 707 was a scheduled passenger flight operated by Kish Air on a Boeing 707 aircraft. The flight was en route from Tehran to Kish Island in the Persian Gulf on September 19, 1995, when it was hijacked. The incident occurred shortly after takeoff from Tehran, when a disgruntled flight attendant, Reza Jabbari, armed with a pistol, took control of the aircraft.

== Hijacking Details ==
The aircraft, originally destined for Kish Island, departed Tehran at approximately 9 a.m. About ninety minutes into the flight, the passengers were informed via loudspeaker that the flight had been hijacked. The destination of the aircraft was not immediately disclosed. The hijacker, Reza Jabbari, an Iranian man in his 30s, expressed dissatisfaction with life in Iran as his motive for the hijacking. Although he initially sought asylum in the United States, he later changed his request to remain in Israel.

As fuel levels began to dwindle, the pilot requested landing permissions from both Saudi Arabia and Jordan, but these requests were denied. Subsequently, the aircraft headed towards Israel. Jordan's King Hussein reportedly informed Israeli Prime Minister Yitzhak Rabin of the aircraft's approach.

== Landing in Israel ==
Israeli Prime Minister Yitzhak Rabin, deviating from standard Israeli policy against aiding hijacked aircraft, authorized the plane's landing to prevent a potential crash. The aircraft was redirected to Ovda Airbase in the Negev Desert, away from densely populated areas due to concerns about possible explosives on board. Upon landing, the hijacker surrendered after approximately an hour.

Passengers disembarked to find themselves in Israel, which they recognized by the Hebrew signage at the airbase. Israeli military personnel provided them with meals and refreshments. Five passengers sought asylum in Israel, while the remainder were expected to return to Iran the following day.

== Political Repercussions ==
The hijacking quickly became a topic of political discourse. Some members of the Knesset suggested leveraging the situation to obtain information about Ron Arad, an Israeli navigator who had been captured in Lebanon in 1986, by pro-Iranian guerrillas. Arad's mother, Batya, arrived at Ovda Airbase and took the opportunity to draw attention to her son's captivity. She was seen placing "Free Ron Arad" stickers on the hijacked plane and unfurling a large banner at its base that read, "Please release Ron Arad."

Meanwhile, Iran's Islamic Republic News Agency condemned the hijacking as an Israeli conspiracy and demanded the immediate return of the aircraft, passengers, and the hijacker.

== Aftermath ==
On September 20, the hijacked aircraft returned to Tehran with all passengers and crew on board, except for Jabbari. Among them were the five passengers who were reported to have requested asylum. Reza Jabbari requested asylum and declared his intention to convert to Judaism. He was sentenced to eight years in Israeli prison but served four years before being granted asylum and remaining in Israel. Jabbari eventually became an Israeli citizen and converted to Judaism.

== See also ==
- Kish Air Flight 7170
