= Amir Nachumi =

Israeli flying ace and general

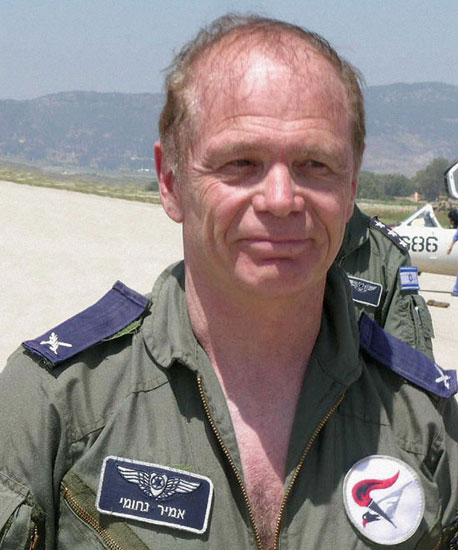
- Native name: אמיר נחומי
- Born: 1945 (age 80–81); Jerusalem, British Mandate for Palestine
- Allegiance: Israel Defense Forces
- Service years: 1962–1996
- Rank: Brigadier general
- Commands: 107 Squadron; 110 Squadron; Ramat David Airbase; IAF Air Group
- Conflicts: Six Day War; War of Attrition; Yom Kippur War; Operation Opera; 1982 Lebanon War; Operation Solomon
- Awards: Medal of Distinguished Service
- Other work: President and CEO of TIL Defense Systems; CEO of Triphase Technologies Ltd. Manager of GlassCeraX

Amir Nachumi (Hebrew: אמיר נחומי; born 1945) is a retired Israeli Air Force Brigadier General who, in the course of his career, shot down 14 enemy aircraft, making him one of Israeli Air Force's top fighter aces. He scored seven aerial victories in the F-4 Phantom II during the Yom Kippur War, and another seven aerial victories in the F-16 Fighting Falcon in fighting over Lebanon, and he has also participated in Operation Opera; the 1981 raid that destroyed an Iraqi nuclear reactor.

== Military service ==
Born in Jerusalem in 1945, Amir Nachumi was drafted into the Israel Defense Forces in 1962. Failing to complete IAF flight course 44, Nachumi joined the IDF Armored Corps with which he completed his mandatory service, attaining the rank of staff sergeant. Discharged in 1964, Nachumi entered the Hebrew University of Jerusalem, graduating in 1967 with a degree in chemistry and physics. Shortly before completing his studies, he was called up to serve in the Six Day War, fighting in the AMX-13.

Following the losses suffered in the war and the subsequent expansion of the IAF, Nachumi was allowed to re-enlist with the IAF flight school. On November 21, 1968, he completed flight course 57 and began flying Dassault Ouragans with 113 Squadron out of Hatzor. Nachumi flew 50 combat missions on the Ouragan during the War of Attrition and later returned to the IAF flight school as an instructor. In 1971 he converted to the McDonnell Douglas F-4 Phantom II, which he flew with 107 Squadron.

=== Yom Kippur War ===
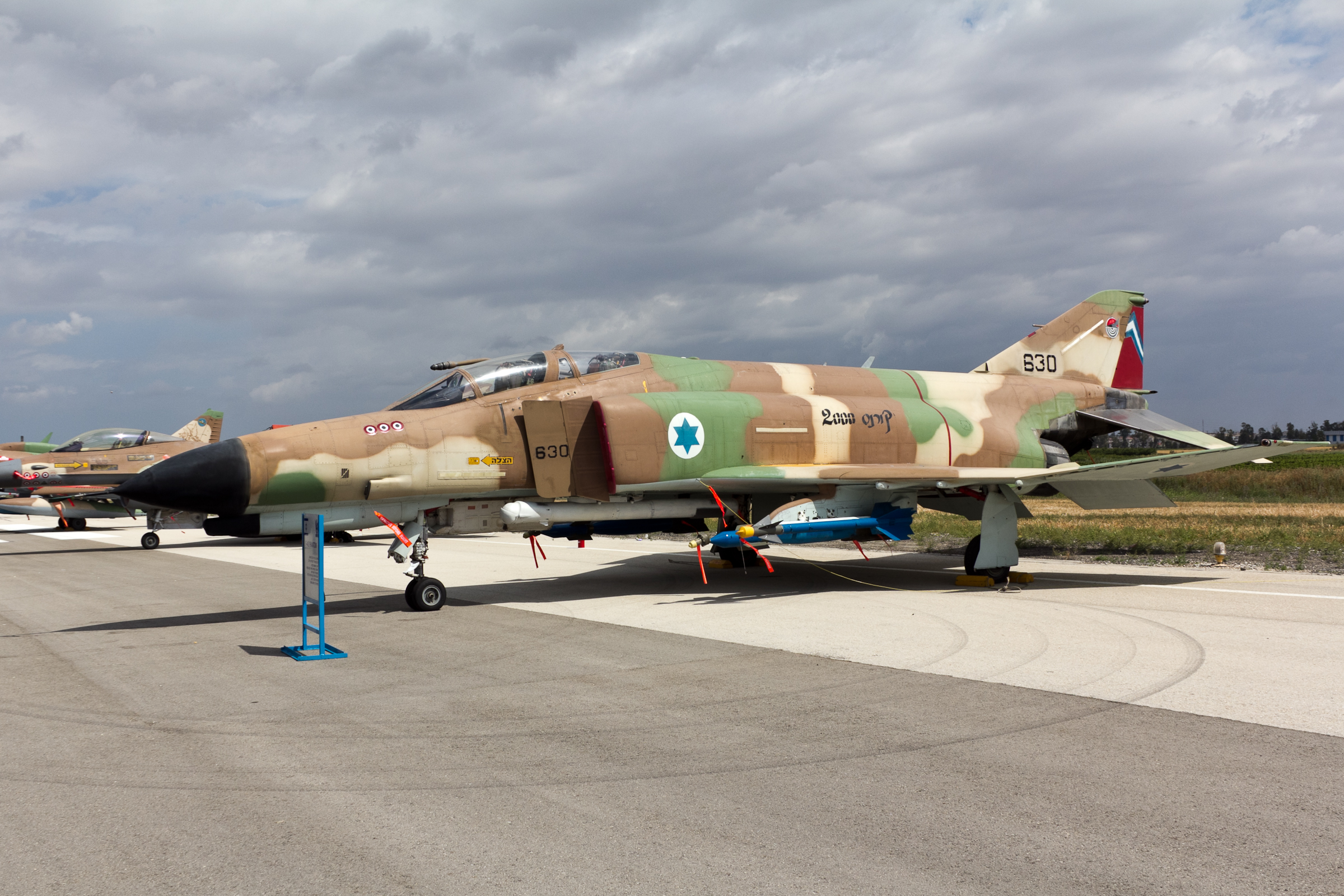
IAF F-4 Phantom with 3 kill markings

In early October 1973 Nachumi was among two F-4 Phantom crews on quick reaction alert duty at Ofir air force base, near Sharm el-Sheikh at the southern tip of the Sinai. Neither pilots were qualified as pair leaders, but on the morning of October 6, when it became clear that war was imminent, Nachumi was promoted on the phone by squadron leader Yiftah Spector.

The two Phantom crews (Nachumi/Yossi Yavin and Daniel Shaki/David Regev) were sitting in their aircraft when war broke out at 14:00, spearheaded by an Egyptian aerial strike against Israeli positions in the Sinai. Radar had detected Egyptian Air Force formations heading for Ofir but the two aircraft were not scrambled yet. Despite orders to the contrary, Nachumi scrambled the two jets himself:

I decided to take off - the controller was screaming that there were orders not to take off. However, I decided that the orders were 400 kilometers away and they didn't know what was going on. I cranked the engine and told my number two to do the same and to scramble as quickly as possible. Standby is very close to the runway so we cranked the engines, went to the runway, and took off. I looked back to see that number two was airborne and that everything was ok, and I saw smoke plumes on the runway, like cotton balls. And I didn't understand. I told my navigator, "Look! What do you make of this?" He said, "They are bombing the runway, this must be war!"

28 EAF MiG-17s and their MiG-21 escorts had arrived to attack Ofir and had Nachumi not made the decision to scramble, the Phantoms would not have been able to take off from the damaged runway. He jettisoned his external fuel tanks and the two aircraft separated, each going after his own quarries. Nachumi had managed to down two MiG-17s using AIM-9 Sidewinders and hit two more with his cannon, when one of his engines suffered a compressor stall. He relit it and continued chasing the MiGs, eventually shooting down two more, both with the AIM-9D. Shaki and Regev had downed 3 other aircraft and both aircraft landed on the damaged runway, avoiding bomb craters and debris. After the war, all four airmen received Israel's third highest decoration, the Medal of Distinguished Service, for their conduct during the battle.

By the war's end Nachumi had also become the IAF's top F-4 Phantom ace, with 7 confirmed kills. He scored his fifth kill on October 13 when 107 squadron struck the Syrian air base at Saiqal. A MiG-21 was attempting to down his wingman when Nachumi manoeuvred behind it and fired an AIM-9D from 1300 meters away. He scored two more kills on the following day, October 14. 107 squadron was tasked with attacking the Egyptian airfield at Tanta, but Nachumi and wingman Meir Most were intercepted en route by a pair of MiG-21s from El Mansoura. After shooting down a MiG that had gone after Most, Nachumi battled with the other aircraft which eventually crashed into the Mediterranean.

=== Opera and Lebanon ===
Seven years after joining the squadron, in June 1978 Nachumi was promoted to 107 squadron leader. Two years later he was selected to lead 110 Squadron, the IAF's second F-16 Fighting Falcon squadron, which formally opened at Ramat David on September 28, 1980.

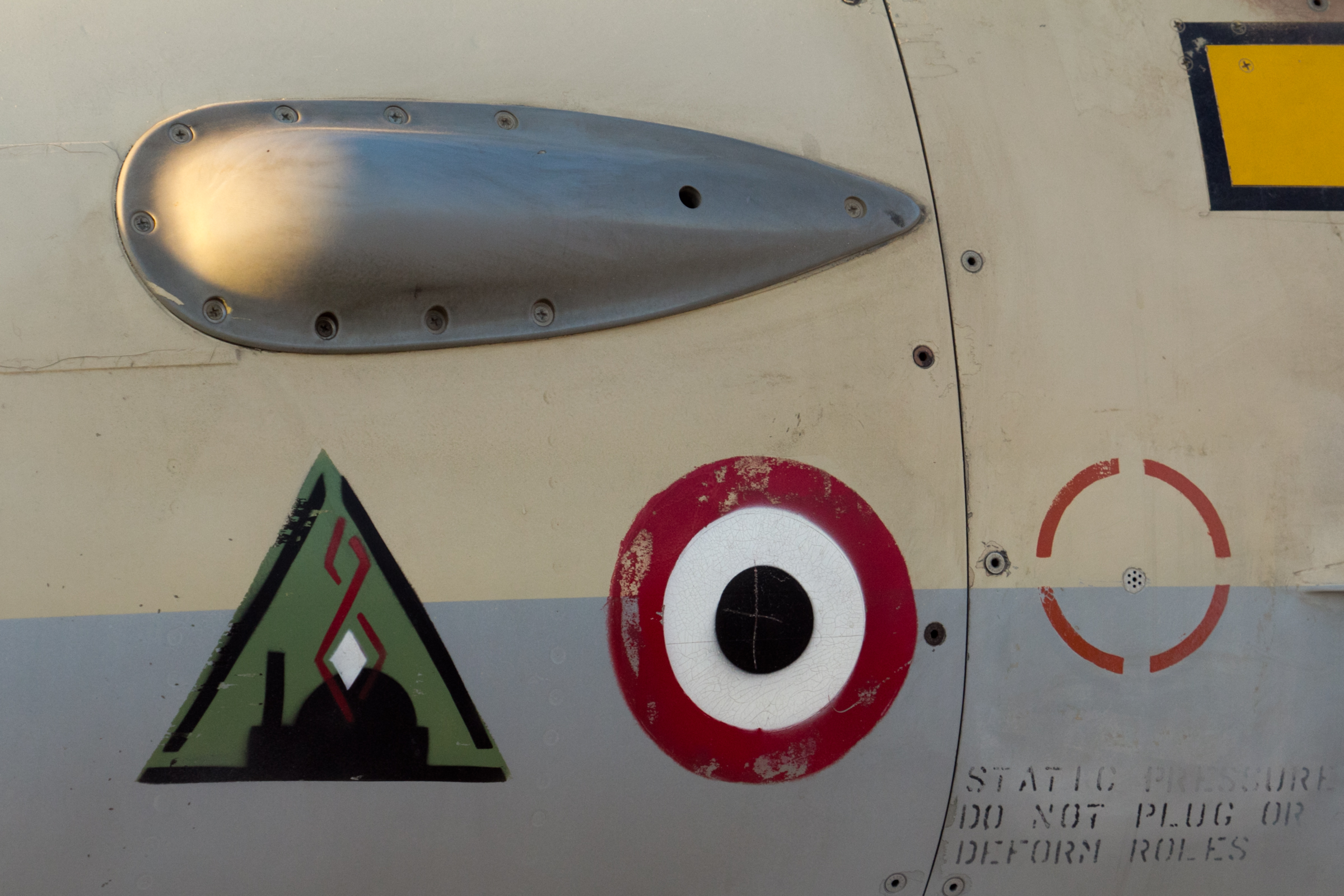
Operation Opera and Syrian Air Force kill markings on IAF F-16A '243'

On June 7, 1981, the Israeli Air Force carried out Operation Opera, when 8 Israeli F-16s destroyed an Iraqi nuclear reactor near Baghdad. Nachumi was the leader of the second four-ship formation to attack the reactor, flying F-16 '228'. A few weeks later, on July 14, a flight of Syrian MiG-21s attempted to intercept Israeli A-4 Skyhawks over Lebanon but were intercepted by their 110 Squadron escorts. Nachumi shot down a single MiG to become the world's first pilot to shoot down an enemy fighter in the F-16.

Over the course of the 1982 Lebanon War, 110 Squadron was credited with 23 aerial kills, including 6 fighters shot down by Nachumi himself, all using the AIM-9L. Three of the kills were scored on the same sortie:

I was on a CAP with my wingman and I sort of forced my way into the combat. I saw the MiGs coming in on my radar screen and I pushed the controller to let me in. I immediately shot down a MiG-23 and then we started to pursue the other MiGs and to manoeuvre with them. I was behind a MiG when my wingman yelled 'One, let me have him, let me have him', and I did the unthinkable – I said 'Have him'. I pulled out and let the wingman have him but he did not shoot him down. He got sandwiched between two MiGs, and instead of coming in after the trailing MiG, he came in after the leading MiG. I ordered him to break, I came in and I shot down the two of them.

=== Later service ===
Now a 14-kills ace, Nachumi completed his tenure at 110 squadron in April 1983 and transferred to the IAF's Air Intelligence Directorate. Four years later he was appointed commander of Ramat David and in 1989 promoted to brigadier general (Tat-Aluf) and assigned command of the IAF's Air Group, responsible for operations and training. In this capacity Nachumi commanded the air element of Operation Solomon, the 1991 airlift of Ethiopian Jews to Israel. Nachumi flew in an IAF C-130 Hercules to Addis Ababa and personally oversaw various logistic elements of the operation.

Amir Nachumi took his last flight on the F-16 on June 26, 1995, flying 110 squadron's F-16C '329'. He retired from the IDF in 1996 but continued to fly with the IAF as a volunteer instructor at the flight academy until April 2005 when forced to retire by new IAF regulations limiting pilot age.

== Civilian career ==
After leaving the military Nachumi was president and CEO of TIL Defense Systems. He was later CEO of Triphase Technologies Ltd., an investment company, and then manager of GlassCeraX, a company dealing with extreme performance material. Besides his chemistry degree from the Hebrew University, he also holds an MBA from Tel Aviv University.

He is married to Naomi and a father of three.

== See also ==
- Lists of flying aces in Arab–Israeli wars
