= Ran Goren =

Israeli fighter pilot and Major General

- רן גורן
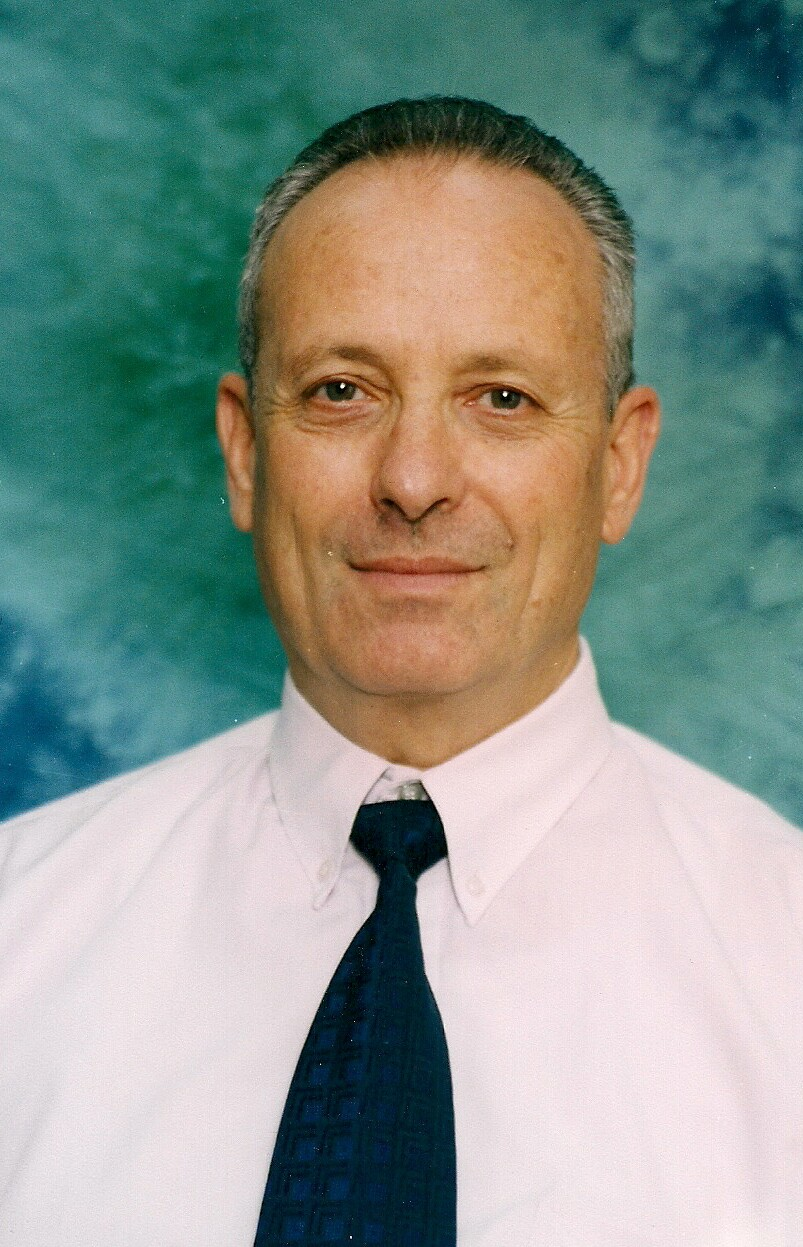
- Ran Goren, 2004
- Born: March 19, 1942 (age 84); Merhavia, British Mandate
- Military career
- Allegiance: Israel
- Branch: Israel Defense Forces
- Service years: 1956–1992
- Rank: Aluf
- Units: 110 Squadron; 117 Squadron
- Commands: Squadron Commander; Commander of Hatzor Airbase; Head of Air Intelligence Group; Deputy Commander of the IAF; Head of Manpower Directorate, 1989–1992
- Wars: Six-Day War; War of Attrition; Yom Kippur War

Ran Goren (Hebrew: רן גורן; born March 19, 1942) is a retired fighter pilot and Major General of the IDF, former Deputy Commander of the Air Force and Head of the Manpower Directorate.

== Biography ==
=== Early life ===
Goren was born in Kibbutz Merhavia to Shoshanna and Abraham, both of whom were teachers. At the age of 14 he joined the Youth Air Battalion where he underwent a gliding course and represented the Israeli delegation to the United States.

=== Fighter pilot career ===
During his service as a fighter pilot, Goren accumulated 4,500 jet flight hours, 400 combat missions and 3 enemy aircraft shot down.

In 1961 he enlisted in the pilot training course where he was trained as a fighter pilot. His first engagement was during a bombing raid in Syria in April 1967. In the Six-Day War, Goren served as a Vautour pilot in the 110 Squadron. During the war he flew 15 combat sorties, amongst them the assault on the Egyptian airfield Beni Suef, the first bombing of the H-3 Iraqi Air Base as part of Operation Focus, and air support mission during the Battle of Abu-Ageila.

At the first month of the War of Attrition, Goren served in the 117 Squadron (Dassault Mirage III), and on July 8, 1969 he shot down a Syrian MiG-21 using a Python missile during an air battle. On July 24, he shot down an Egyptian Su-7 that infiltrated Sinai in an attempt to attack IDF posts. After these air battles he was promoted to Deputy Commander of the Skyhawk Squadron. in which he flew up to the end of the War of Attrition around 160 operational missions.

In 1969 Goren underwent training on F-4 Phantom and was nominated as a Deputy Commander of the 69 Phantom Squadron. In 1972 he was the founder and first commander of the A-4 Advanced Training Squadron in the Flight School, also serving the emergency postings in the event of war. During the Yom Kippur War, Goren served as a senior group leader in the 107 Squadron. During the first day of the war, Goren shot down an Mil Mi-8, a transport helicopter that carried Egyptian commandos on their way to attack on the Bir Gifgafa Airfield in the Sinai Peninsula. During one of his missions in the war, he was hit by anti aircraft artillery and forced to bail out.

=== Non-fighting commanding officer ===
After the Yom Kippur War Goren replaced Iftach Spector as the commander of the 107 squadron. Later he served as Deputy Commander of Ramat David Airbase.

Goren passed down the corps and served as the Chief of Operations of the IAF, after which he left to study in California. Goren received a master's degree in business administration, cum laude, from the Naval Postgraduate School. His seminar paper dealt with the development of a future combat aircraft for Israel.

After his return Goren held a number of high-ranking positions in the Air Force including: base Commander of Hatzor Airbase during the War of Galilee (1982), Head of the Intelligence Group, Head of Air Division, and in 1987 Goren was appointed Chief of Staff of the Air Force, which is also the Deputy Commander of the Air Force. As the Chief of Staff he sought to stop the development of the IAI Lavi fighter aircraft because of the unbearable financial burden it imposed on the air Force and the IDF as a whole. He later led the staff through the design and implementation of an alternative power building programs, including the purchase of five F-15s, sixty F-16s (C & D models), 24 Apache attack helicopter and comprehensive UAV development programs.

During the "Blue and Brown" operation (8–9 December 1988) - the raid on the headquarters of the Popular Front for the Liberation of Palestine – General Command of Ahmad Jibril, in Nuema village, about 10 km south of Beirut, Goren, as the Chief of Staff of the IAF, commanded the heroic rescue of four Golani soldiers, which were detached from the main force and missed their evacuation. The four soldiers were left until the next morning in the midst of the enemy stronghold, from where they were rescued in a dramatic operation, which consisted of isolating the battle area by fighter aircraft, and executing the rescue mission by two Cobra attack helicopters. The helicopters tried thrice to penetrate into the enemy stronghold, but were forced to withdraw due to heavy fire, which hit the leading helicopter. Only in their fourth attempt they succeeded to land, loaded the four soldiers on the side shelves and landing skis, and brought them safely to an Israeli Navy missile boat.

In 1989 Goren was appointed Head of Manpower Directorate of the IDF, with the rank of Major General. He served in this position, as well as a member of the IDF General Staff, through the Gulf War (1991). Goren retired from his military service in 1992.

== Book author ==
In 2011 he published "Vertigo", a thriller about the experiences and traumas of the Israeli Air Force's pilots during the battles of the Yom Kippur War, as well as their implications on their civil lives some 30 years later.

== Private life ==
Goren has three sons, fighter pilots, and a daughter who's married to a fighter pilot, and 13 grandchildren.
