= Ran Ronen-Pekker =

Israeli Air Force general

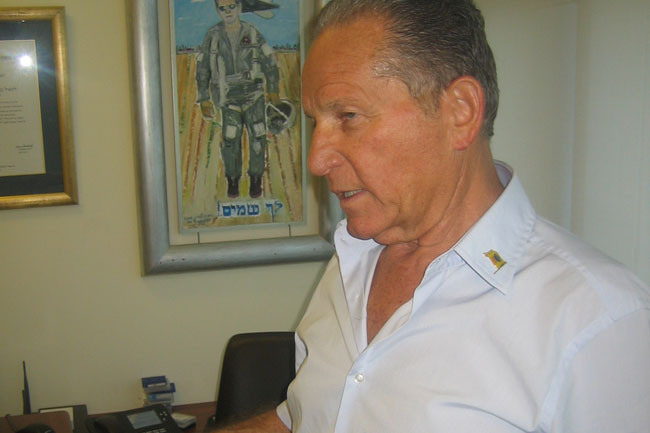
- Native name: רן רונן-פקר
- Born: 19 July 1936; Kfar Vitkin, British Mandate for Palestine
- Died: 3 December 2016 (aged 80) Tel Aviv, Israel
- Allegiance: Israel
- Branch: Israeli Air Force
- Service years: 1954–1981
- Rank: Brigadier general
- Commands: 119 Squadron; One Squadron; IAF Flight School; Tel Nof Airbase
- Conflicts: Suez Crisis; Six-Day War; War of Attrition; Yom Kippur War
- Other work: Deputy Director of Dahaf; Consul General of Israel in Los Angeles; Founder of Zahala Project; Owner of Pekker Enterprises; Israel Aerospace Industries

Ran Ronen (Hebrew: רן רונן; originally Ran Pekker, Hebrew: רן פקר; 19 July 1936 – 3 December 2016) was an Israeli Air Force (IAF) brigadier general and fighter ace credited with eight victories. He commanded various fighter squadrons, the IAF flight academy, and Tel Nof Airbase, retiring from the IAF with the rank of brigadier general. One of his pilots later described him as "the greatest squadron commander ever".

== Biography and early military service ==
Ran Ronen was born on 19 July 1936 in Kfar Vitkin, to Leah (née Sturman) and David Pekker, founding members of Kfar Vitkin.

In March 1954 he enlisted in the IAF. He began flying Spitfire aircraft and later served in the 117th Squadron flying Meteors. He later joined the new 113th Squadron, flying Ouragans. During the Sinai Campaign, he flew the new French Mystère. After the war, he spent a year in a French Air Force squadron as part of a training mission for IAF pilots, served as an instructor in the Air Force flight school, and in 1962 was appointed deputy commander of the 101st squadron.

== Pre–Six-Day War activities ==
=== Mirage incident ===
In 1963, Ronen was flying a new Mirage III, when his engine lost power. He did not want to eject and risk killing people in a village below, but he remembered the warning from the French manufacturers that should he attempt to land without power, the nose of the plane would slam against the ground, killing the pilot. He guided the plane until he was over an empty field and finally ejected at an altitude of only 500 feet. The plane glided down and landed nearly intact. An inspection revealed the issue to be a weak fuel pump component which explained the failure and previous crashes of 7 IAF and 16 French Mirages. Ezer Weizman, then the Israeli Air Force Commander, sent him a bottle of whiskey and a poem praising the unique pilot who landed his plane after ejecting. Ronen continued using the plane after its repairs.

After a period at the IAF Officer School he was appointed deputy commander of a combat squadron at Hatzor Airbase, and in the summer of 1965 was appointed the commander of the 119 "bat" Mirage Squadron.

On 16 August 1966, Ronen escorted Iraqi pilot Munir Redfa, who defected together with his MiG-21 in Operation Diamond.

On 13 November 1966, during Operation Shredder, he achieved his first air to air kill, shooting down a Jordanian Hawker Hunter after an eight-minute dogfight – the longest dogfight in IAF history. On 7 April 1967, he downed a Syrian MiG-21.

== Six-Day War ==
During the 1967 Six-Day War, Ronen's squadron took part in Operation Moked and other bombing missions, as well as air-to-air battles against Syrian and Egyptian pilots. Ronen shot down two Egyptian MiG-19s for a squadron total of 19 kills and two aircraft lost, less than any other squadron. None of their pilots were killed.

== War of Attrition and Yom Kippur War ==
During the War of Attrition, Ronen commanded the IAF Flight School while still flying reserve in Squadron 119. He shot down three Egyptian MiG-21s, making him Israel's second jet ace with a total of seven kills.

In the summer of 1970, after Shmuel Hetz, commander of Phantom Squadron 201 was shot down, Ronen was appointed the commander of the squadron, despite having never flown the F-4 Phantom before. Ronen led the squadron in assaults against the Egyptian SAM system and is credited with restoring the fighting spirit of the squadron.

In 1972 After completing a command course at Marine Corps Base Quantico, he was appointed commander of the IAF Training division and promoted to the rank of colonel.

He was appointed the commander of the Tel Nof Airbase and commanded it during the Yom Kippur War. In 1975 he was promoted to brigadier general.

== Controversy ==
In 1979 he returned to Israel from two years at Harvard University and was considered for the post of commander of the air force.

However anonymous reports reached the Defense Minister, alleging that immediately after the Six-Day War, Ronen executed a captured Jordanian company commander who had confessed to murdering Israeli pilot Shabtai Ben-Aharon, who had bailed out near Ma'aleh Adumim. Ronen decried it as libel. Several investigations cleared Ronen of this accusation, but the Military Advocate General recommended to the chief of staff to reconsider Ronen's promotion. This, as well as a personal feud between Ronen and IAF commander General David Ivry, resulted in Ronen being denied promotion.

In November 1981 Ronen retired from the IDF with the rank of brigadier general having flown over 350 combat sorties.

== Air-to-air victories ==
Number	Date	Ronen's airplane	Enemy airplane	Weapon used	Details
1	13 November 1966	Mirage III	Jordanian Hawker Hunter	Cannon	In the IAF's longest dogfight ever, against Muwaffaq Salti, the commander of the Jordanian Hunter Squadron
2	7 April 1967	Mirage III	Syrian MiG-21	Cannon	During a mass air battle over the Golan Heights
3	5 June 1967	Mirage III	Egyptian MiG-19	Cannon	Over Ghardaka, part of Operation Moked
4	5 June 1967	Mirage III	Egyptian MiG-19	Cannon	Second kill of the same battle
5	5 June 1967	Mirage III	Egyptian MiG-21	Shafrir-2	During a mass air battle over the Nile Delta
6	21 May 1969	Mirage III	Egyptian MiG-21	Cannon	Over Ismailla
7	11 September 1969	Mirage III	Egyptian MiG-21	Sidewinder	During a mass air battle over the Nile Delta

== After his retirement from the IDF ==
Ronen worked as deputy director of the advertising agency Dahaf.

In 1989 he was appointed Consul General of Israel in Los Angeles and Hebraized his surname to Ronen. He served for three years.

In 1992 he founded the Zahala Project, which works with at-risk teenagers to instill the values of Zionism and social responsibility. The project was adopted by the Ministry of Education, and defined by Education Minister Zevulun Hammer as a "national project". For his work with Zahala, Ronen (along with Ruth Dayan) was awarded the Yigal Alon Award. His mentor and former commander Ezer Weizman was honored with giving him the award.

In 2002 he published his autobiography Eagle in the Sky in Hebrew. An English version was released in 2016 with a foreword by Dan Halutz, a former commander of the IAF.

In 2007 he was featured in two episodes of the History Channel's Dogfights. In "Dogfights of the Middle East" Ronen covers the battle of Ghardaka and the defection of an Iraqi MiG-21, and in "Desert Aces" he relates his downing of the Jordanian Hawker Hunter.

In 2008 he won the Moskowitz Prize for Zionism. The award committee explained the decision to honor Ronen "The prize is awarded for being an exemplary example of courage, sacrifice and leadership, for his exceptional handling of the educational and ethical challenges facing Zionism, and for his success in establishing the Zahala project, by recruiting former officers and commanders to the forefront of social action for Israeli youth."

Ronen was the sole owner of Pekker Enterprises, an advisory firm.

From 2009 to 2012 he was a member of the Board of Directors of Israel Aerospace Industries.

In 2013 his book Diary of Operations was published by Yedioth Ahronoth. It is based on his previous book, but focuses on the operational issues.

== Academic achievements ==
He held a master's degree in Public Administration from Harvard University and served as a Research Fellow at the Brookings Institution and at the RAND Corporation.

== Personal life ==
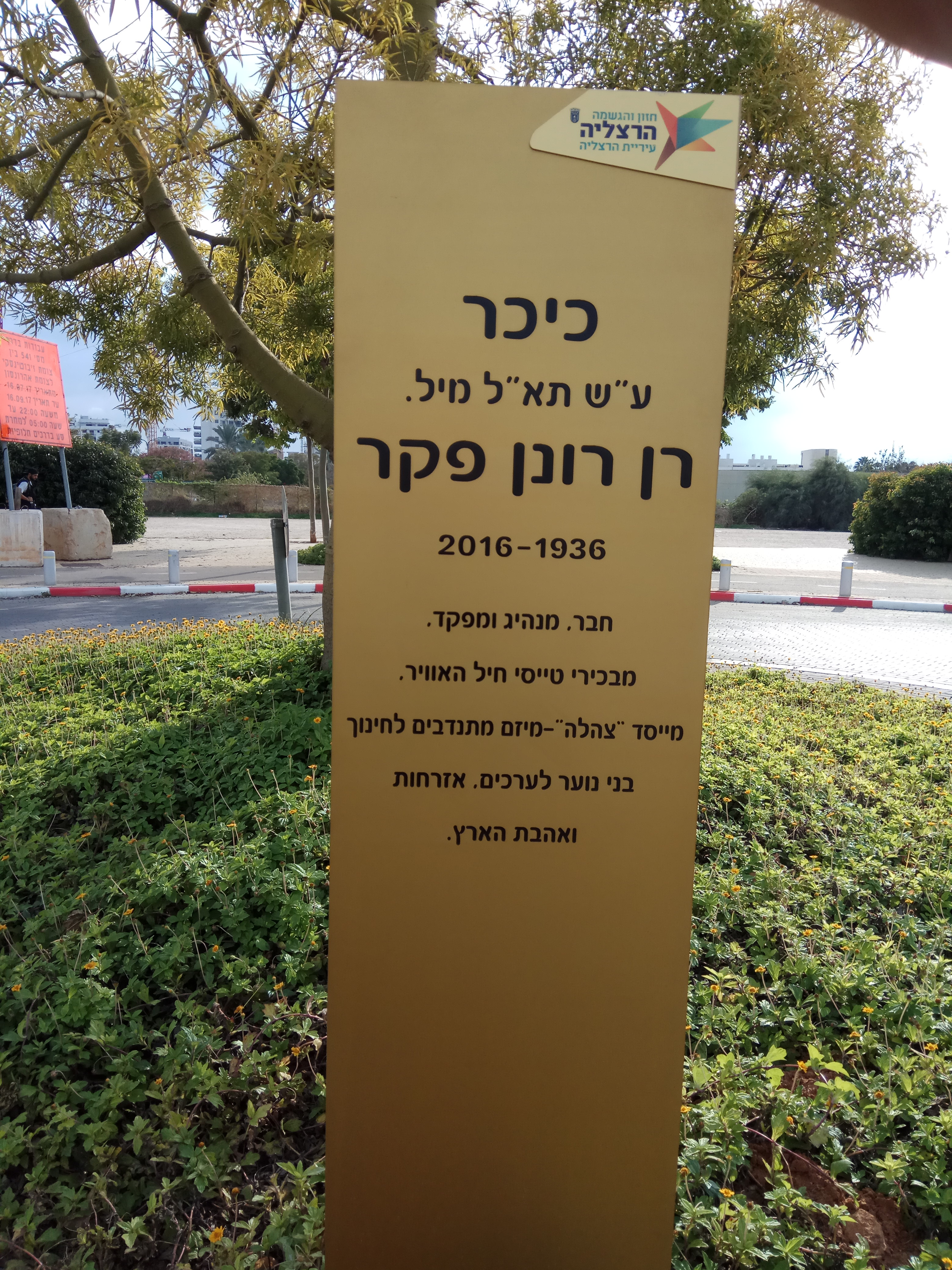
Memorial to Ran Ronen at a roundabout in Herzliya

At the age of 21, Ronen married Herutah, whom he met at the age of eight, and the couple had three children. After thirty years of marriage, the couple divorced. His second wife was singer Mali Bronstein, whom he later divorced.

Ran Ronen died of blood cancer on 3 December 2016 in Tel Aviv.

== See also ==
- Muwaffaq Salti Air Base
- List of Israeli flying aces
- Giora Romm
- Giora Epstein
