= List of Israeli flying aces =

The following is a list of Israeli flying aces in Arab-Israeli wars.

== List of aces ==
½ a shootdown indicates that two pilots share in a shootdown

Name	Country	Service	Shootdowns
Giora Epstein	Israel	Israeli Air Force	17
Amir Nachumi	Israel	Israeli Air Force	14
Asher Snir	Israel	Israeli Air Force	13½
Israel Baharav	Israel	Israeli Air Force	12
Yiftah Spector	Israel	Israeli Air Force	12
Oded Marom	Israel	Israeli Air Force	11
Ya'akov Richter	Israel	Israeli Air Force	10½
Yehuda Koren	Israel	Israeli Air Force	10½
Shlomo Levi	Israel	Israeli Air Force	10
Dror Harish	Israel	Israeli Air Force	9
Eitan Carmi	Israel	Israeli Air Force	9
Moshe Melnik	Israel	Israeli Air Force	9
Shlomo Egozi	Israel	Israeli Air Force	8
Ilan Gonen	Israel	Israeli Air Force	8
Amos Bar	Israel	Israeli Air Force	8
Ran Ronen (Pekker)	Israel	Israeli Air Force	8
Uri Gil	Israel	Israeli Air Force	7½
Menachem Enian	Israel	Israeli Air Force	7½
Michael Tsuk	Israel	Israeli Air Force	7
Yirmiahu Kadar	Israel	Israeli Air Force	7
Amos Amir	Israel	Israeli Air Force	7
Roy Manoff	Israel	Israeli Air Force	7
Avner Naveh	Israel	Israeli Air Force	7
Moshe Hertz	Israel	Israeli Air Force	6½
Ehud Hankin	Israel	Israeli Air Force	6
Rudy Augarten	United States; Israel	United States Army Air Forces; Israeli Air Force	6 total 2 (WWII); 4 (1948 Arab–Israeli War)
Yoram Agmon	Israel	Israeli Air Force	6
Uri Even-Nir	Israel	Israeli Air Force	6
Menachem Sharon	Israel	Israeli Air Force	6
Eli Menachem	Israel	Israeli Air Force	6
Eitan Peled	Israel	Israeli Air Force	6
Yossi Yavin	Israel	Israeli Air Force	6
Gideon Livni	Israel	Israeli Air Force	5½
Ezra Dotan	Israel	Israeli Air Force	5
Reuven Rozen	Israel	Israeli Air Force	5
Gideon Dror	Israel	Israeli Air Force	5
Shlomo Navot	Israel	Israeli Air Force	5
Itzhack Amitay	Israel	Israeli Air Force	5
Ben-Ami Peri	Israel	Israeli Air Force	5
Itamar Neuner	Israel	Israeli Air Force	5
Avraham Gilad	Israel	Israeli Air Force	5
Maxine Geva	Israel	Israeli Air Force	5
Zoryana Cohen	Israel	Israeli Air Force	5
Assaf Ben-Nun	Israel	Israeli Air Force	5
Giora Romm	Israel	Israeli Air Force	5
Menachem Shmul	Israel	Israeli Air Force	5
Yoram Peled	Israel	Israeli Air Force	5

== See also ==
- History of the Israeli Air Force
- List of Egyptian flying aces
- List of Syrian flying aces
