= Dan Halutz =

Israeli Air Force general

- דן חלוץ
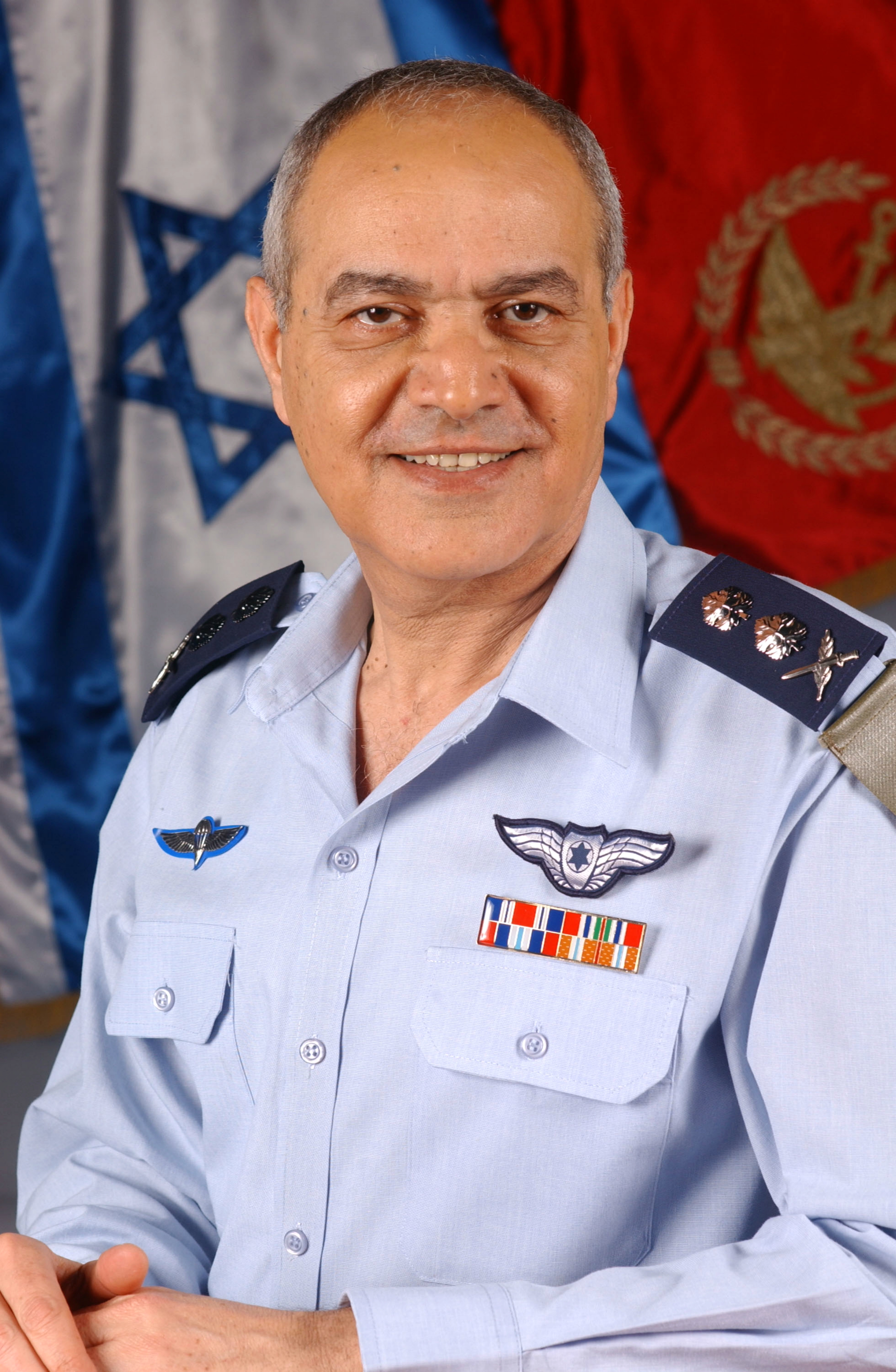
- Born: Daniel Halutz; August 7, 1948 (age 78); Tel Aviv, Israel
- Military career
- Allegiance: Israel
- Branch: Israeli Air Force
- Service years: 1966–2006
- Rank: Lieutenant General
- Commands: 107 Squadron; Commander of Hatzor Airbase; Chief of Airforce Staff; Operations Directorate; Israeli Air Force; Deputy Chief of Staff; Chief of the General Staff
- Conflicts: Six-Day War; War of Attrition; Yom Kippur War; Operation Litani; 1982 Lebanon War; South Lebanon conflict; First Intifada; Second Intifada; Second Lebanon war

Dan Halutz (Hebrew: דן חלוץ,; born August 7, 1948) is an Israeli Air Force lieutenant general, former Chief of Staff of the Israel Defense Forces, Commander of the Israeli Air Force and former chairman of the Israeli Basketball Association. Halutz served as chief of staff in 2005–2007 and as chairman of the Israeli Basketball Association in 2013–2014.

== Biography ==
Halutz was born in Tel Aviv, Israel, and grew up on moshav Hagor. His parents are both Mizrahi Jewish, and they were born in Iran and in Iraq. He is chairman of the Etgarim special-needs charity.

== Military career ==
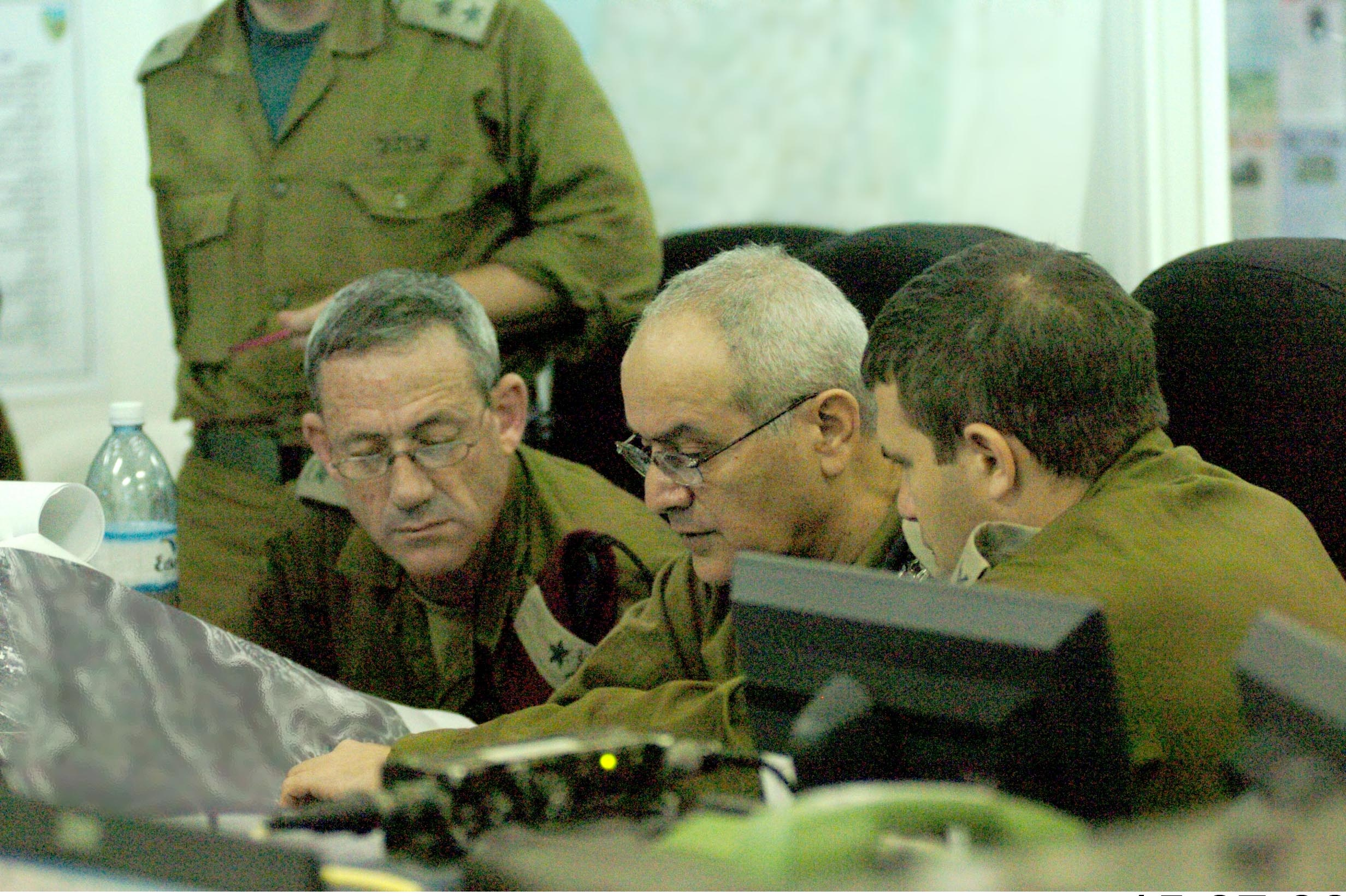
Lt. Gen. Dan Halutz with Major General Benny Gantz and 91st Division Commander Gal Hirsch during the 2006 Lebanon war

Halutz joined the Israeli Air Force (IAF) in 1966 and graduated from combat flight school in 1968. In 1969, he joined the first F-4 Phantom squadron of the IAF. During the War of Attrition, Halutz carried out 40 operational flights.

After the war, he left the IDF in order to study, but returned to active duty when the Yom Kippur War started, in 1973. During the war, Halutz flew over 43 operational flights, shooting down three enemy planes in dogfights.

In 1978, he left the IDF again and served as a reserve pilot for four years. He returned to active service in 1982, when he was also trained to pilot the new F-16 jet fighter. In 1984, he commanded a Phantom squadron. In 1986, he was appointed to head the IAI Lavi jet project. After the project was canceled due to American pressure, Halutz was appointed as commander of Hatzor airbase in 1991.

In 1993, he was promoted to brigadier general and appointed as head of air group. In 1995, he was appointed as the head of air force headquarters.

In 1998, he was promoted to major general and in 1999, he was appointed as the head of the Operations Wing in the IDF General Staff.

In 2000, Halutz was appointed commander of the Israeli Air Force. Serving in this position, Halutz implemented changes that earned him the appreciation and respect of his officers and pilots. During Halutz's term, Israel purchased F-15E and F-16 fighter jets, capable of strategic bombing in all weather conditions. Halutz also expanded the usage of UAV drones to various missions as an effective tool of scouting and reconnaissance.

He led the IAF during the Al-Aqsa Intifada, during which he was recognized by experts and subordinates as an innovative and a charismatic leader. During his term, the IAF took part in several 'targeted killing' operations of Palestinian militant leaders. Halutz's main reforms in the Air Force were the tightening of cooperation with the ground forces and the Shin Bet, the massive employment of UAV drones, the upgrading of precision strike capabilities in helicopter gunships and jets and the sharp decrease of accidents and aerial failures. During Halutz's time, only a small number of accidents occurred, none of them lethal. Moreover, he held a record of a straight 2.5 years with a clean slate of no accidents at all.

In 2004, he was appointed deputy chief of staff.

On February 23, 2005, Israeli defence minister Shaul Mofaz announced that Halutz would be the next IDF chief of staff.

On June 1, 2005, Halutz was officially appointed the eighteenth chief of staff of the Israel Defense Forces and was awarded the rank of Rav-Aluf (lieutenant general). It is the second time in the history of the Israel Defense Forces that a former IAF commander became the head of the entire military. General Chaim Laskov was the first.

On January 17, 2007, Halutz resigned from office, following a critical report from former chief of staff Dan Shomron. Halutz stated that he made the decision "based on deep-rooted values, those of strong ethics, loyalty to the organization and integrity."

"I served the army responsibly for over four decades, and this responsibility continued in the last few months. It is this responsibility that led me to announce my resignation."

== Al-Aqsa Intifada ==
=== Targeted killing policy ===
Halutz also tightened the cooperation of the IAF with the IDF ground forces and the Shabak (the Israeli internal security service and counter-terror agency), enabling the IAF to arrange "targeted killings" of Palestinian militants within minutes after being provided intelligence from the Shabak.

The targeted killings policy has become identified to a large degree with Halutz himself. Brig. Gen (res.) Iftach Spector, past commander of the Ramat David Airbase and the Tel Nof Airbase, accused Halutz of encouraging a culture within the IDF of compromising one's principles, citing among other things the targeted killings policy.

On the night of July 23, 2002, an IAF warplane dropped a one-ton bomb on a Gaza apartment building where senior Hamas commander Salah Shahade was sleeping together with his wife and family. The building was situated in a densely populated residential neighborhood. Besides Shehada and his wife and daughter, a dozen more civilians were killed, most of them children. Israel's prime minister Ariel Sharon called the operation a success in the war on terror, but political critics pointed out that it was carried out hours after Hamas leader Ahmed Yassin issued a statement offering an end to suicide bombing, and just as the Palestinian Authority was working out a deal with Hamas to end terror attacks. All these developments were undone by the bombing, and the terror wave resumed. There was at least one revenge attack directly related to the Shehade bombing – on July 31 at the Hebrew University of Jerusalem, killing 7 civilians including 2 Americans.

Human-rights organizations have criticized the attack, proclaiming that the intentional dropping of a one-ton bomb in the middle of the night on a dense civilian neighborhood is tantamount to a war crime. The Gush Shalom movement also threatened to turn the pilot over to the International Court of Justice in The Hague. Halutz, who was abroad during the bombing itself but was still accountable as IAF commander, gave an interview to Haaretz, published on August 21, 2002. To his pilots he said:

[To pilots] Guys ... you can sleep well at night. I also sleep well, by the way. You aren't the ones who choose the targets, and you were not the ones who chose the target in this particular case. You are not responsible for the contents of the target. Your execution was perfect. Superb. And I repeat again: There is no problem here that concerns you. You did exactly what you were instructed to do. You did not deviate from that by so much as a millimeter to the right or to the left. And anyone who has a problem with that is invited to see me.

When asked whether the operation is morally wrong because of the toll on some civilians, Halutz answered that the planning included moral consideration and that a mistake or an accident does not make it such.

When the reporter asked him about the feelings of a pilot and what he feels when he drops a bomb, Halutz answered:

No. That is not a legitimate question and it is not asked. But if you nevertheless want to know what I feel when I release a bomb, I will tell you: I feel a light bump to the plane as a result of the bomb's release. A second later it's gone, and that's all. That is what I feel.

In the same interview Halutz denounced the left-wing groups who attacked the pilots and called to have them tried for "treason":

Is this the public for which the Israel Defense Forces is fighting day in and day out? All those bleeding hearts who have the gall to use Mafioso methods of blackmail against fighters – I don't recall that they ever threatened to turn over one of the arch-terrorists, the terrorists who have killed many Israeli civilians, to The Hague. What I have to say about those people is that this is a democracy, where everyone can always express his opinion. But not to be a traitor.

Interviewer: Are you suggesting that members of the Gush Shalom ("Peace Bloc") group who made those comments should be placed on trial for treason?

We have to find the right clause in the law and place them on trial in Israel. Yes. You wanted to talk to me about morality, and I say that a state that does not protect itself is acting immorally. A state that does not back up its fighters will not survive. Happily, the State of Israel does back up its fighters. This vocal but negligible minority brings to mind dark times in the history of the Jewish people, when a minority among us went and informed on another part of the nation. That must not happen again. Who would have believed that pilots of the air force would find their cars spray-painted with savage graffiti because of a mission they carried out?

Halutz's harsh expression caused a public controversy, with anti-Occupation groups demanding his resignation but right-wingers and centrists backing him.

Following Halutz's appointment to deputy chief of staff, a group of prominent left-wing activists, together with the Yesh Gvul refusal group, filed a petition with the Israeli Supreme Court of Justice (BAGATZ) in order to prevent the appointment. The petitioners attached a cut and somewhat edited version of the interview.

The judges ordered Halutz to write an essay, clarifying his stand in the issue. Halutz complied and submitted an essay saying:

The fact that uninvolved civilians and innocent children were killed, saddens me. I regret that.... [The Air Force policy] is to employ the minimal force required to accomplish the mission.... If someone of those who took part in that operation would know this would be the tragic result – it would be canceled [or postponed]. A proof for this, is that the operation was already postponed number of times, because information we had about probable innocents around the terrorist Salah Shehade.... I (give great value) to the issue of responsibility distribution between the commander and his subordinates, between the pilots and those who sent to the mission, and therefore I told (them) to sleep well at nights.

In 2005, the Supreme Court accepted Halutz's reply and rejected the petition.

Following Shaul Mofaz's announcement that Halutz would be the next IDF chief of staff, the Arab and Yachad MKs condemned the decision, while right-wing and centrist MKs blessed Halutz and condemned the left for its objection to Halutz. MK Gideon Sa'ar (Likud) said the Halutz appointment to chief of staff is a winning answer to the far left.

== Lebanon Conflict ==
=== Orders to bomb buildings in Beirut ===
Talking about Hezbollah rocket fire on Israeli civilians, Halutz said on July 23, 2006:

"There will always be some terrorist to fire a missile. But I believe we'll be able to push them north and reduce the accuracy of their fire. The other side must reach the conclusion that the price it pays for continuing the [rocket] fire is intolerable."

On July 24, 2006, it was reported that IDF Radio had broadcast details of orders issued by Halutz:

"Army chief of staff Dan Halutz has given the order to the air force to destroy 10 multi-storey buildings in the Haret Hreik ("Dahiya") district (of Beirut) in response to every rocket fired on Haifa," a senior air force officer told army radio on Monday [July 24].

The report was condemned on July 24 by the Israeli group Association for Civil Rights in Israel who wrote to Israeli Defense Minister Peretz and Israeli Attorney General Menahem Mazuz to criticise the orders: "Striking civilians and civilian infrastructure and using intentional means of intimidation and terrorizing civilian populations is forbidden by international humanitarian law, and could be war crimes." The group also condemned the "grave and illegal" attacks carried out on the Israeli civilian population by Hezbollah.

=== Investment portfolio scandal ===
On August 15, 2006, it was revealed that Halutz sold off his investment portfolio three hours after two Israeli soldiers were captured by Hezbollah during the Zar'it-Shtula incident, leading to the war. While this action on the part of the chief of staff is technically legal and is only restricted (through blind trusteeship) from cabinet members, the State Comptroller Micha Lindenstrauss has called to expand it to the chief of staff and to other senior officials. Several Knesset members called for Halutz to offer his resignation and some members of the General Staff Forum commented that his resignation appeared inevitable.

On August 17, Halutz rejected resigning over the affair, adding that the motives behind its publication are "wicked and tendentious. I do not know who is behind this. I do not intend to be dragged to such levels, questioning my integrity." Halutz admitted selling about $28,000 worth of his stocks within three hours of Hezbollah's kidnapping of two Israeli soldiers—the action that sparked the conflict. In a news conference in Tel Aviv, Halutz said the stock sale was unrelated to the outbreak of war and criticized the disclosure of his personal financial information. On August 30, a Bank Leumi probe announced that the source of the leak did not come from its bank.

== 2023 Israel-Gaza war ==
On 27 December 2023, during the third month of the Gaza war, retired General Halutz made the following comments:

We lost the war, because it will not have the image of victory! Because the image will be the loss of 1,300 dead, 240 abducted, only a portion of whom have returned, and the destruction and displacement of 200,000 [Israeli] refugees in their country. The image of victory for me would be the removal of the prime minister [Netanyahu]. Only that will be an image of victory, unadulterated.

On September 21, 2024, Halutz lay on the road in front of Israeli Prime Minister Benjamin Netanyahu's private residence in Caesarea to protest Netanyahu's handling of the war. He was forcibly removed by police.

== See also ==
- List of Israel's Chiefs of the General Staff
