= Lists of flying aces in Arab–Israeli wars =

Lists of flying aces in Arab–Israeli wars cover flying aces of the Arab–Israeli conflict. These are military aviators who typically have shot down five or more enemy aircraft. The lists are organized by nationality.

== Lists ==
- List of Egyptian flying aces
- List of Israeli flying aces
- List of Syrian flying aces
