= List of Egyptian flying aces =

The following Egyptian pilots are confirmed or alleged to have become flying aces by scoring five or more air-to-air victories while flying combat—mainly against the Israeli Air Force:

- Ali Wajai (alias Ali Wagedy) flew a MiG 21 with 5 confirmed aerial victories.
- Major Sami Marei was credited with five aerial victories between 1966 and 1968 while flying a MiG 21. Major Marei was killed in action on 26 February 1970.
- Captain Saad Dahman gained five aerial victories in a MiG 21.
- Ahmed Al Mansoori 6 confirmed aerial victories

It is not known if this list is complete.

== See also ==
- Flying ace
- List of Israeli flying aces
- List of Syrian flying aces
