= List of Syrian flying aces =

The following are Syrian individuals who became flying aces by scoring five or more confirmed aerial victories.

Flying Ace	Victories	Rank	Fighter Jet	Birth Place
General Fayez Mansour	15	General	Mig-17+Mig-21FL	Homs
Brigadier Majad Halabi	7	Brigadier	MiG-21FL	Aleppo city
Captain Dzhur Abid Adib	5	Captain	MiG-21FL	Dreikish, Tartous Governorate
Captain Muhammad Mansour	5	Captain	MiG-21MF	Tafas, Daraa Governorate

== See also ==
- MiG-21 aces
- List of Israeli flying aces
- List of Egyptian flying aces
