= Iftach Spector =

Retired Israeli brigadier general

- יפתח ספקטור
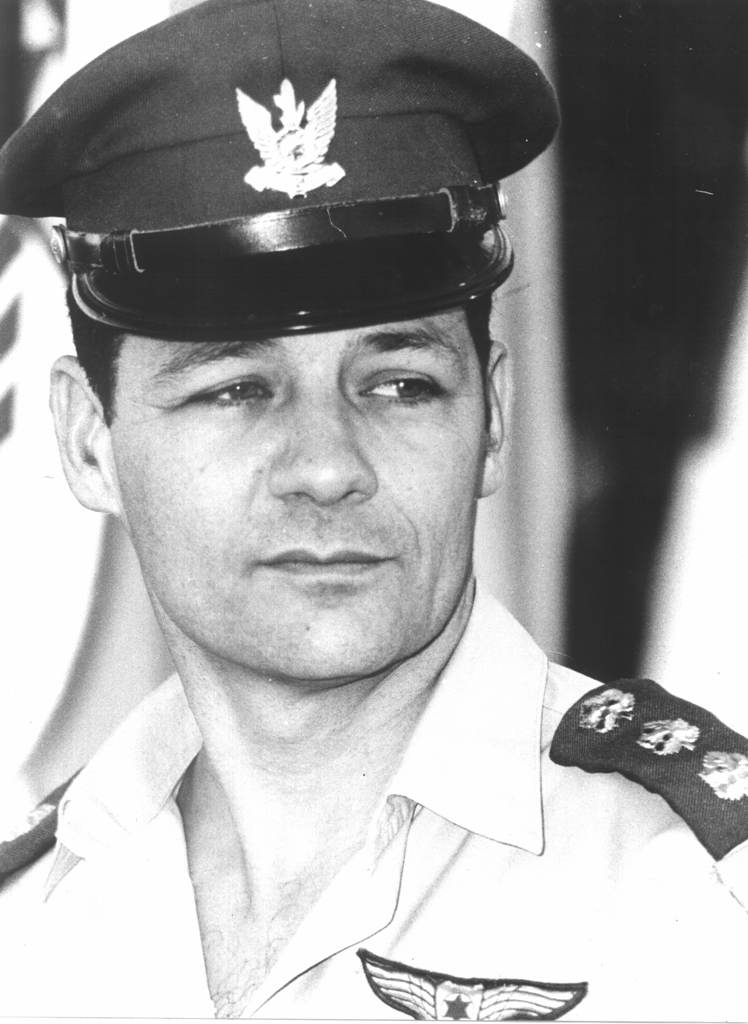
- Born: 20 October 1940 (age 85); Petah Tikva, Mandatory Palestine
- Military career
- Allegiance: Israel
- Branch: Israeli Air Force
- Service years: 1958–1985
- Rank: Brigadier General
- Commands: 107 Squadron; 101 Squadron; Ramat David Airbase; IAF Air Group
- Conflicts: Six-Day War; War of Attrition; Yom Kippur War; Operation Opera

Iftach Spector (Hebrew: יפתח ספקטור; born 20 October 1940) is a retired Israeli brigadier general, a former fighter pilot and commander of the airbases at Tel Nof and Ramat David. He serves on the Israel Advisory Council of the Israel Policy Forum. He is an Israeli Air Force fighter ace credited with 12 victories and was the leader of the attack against the USS Liberty which resulted in the deaths of 34 American crew members.

== Biography ==
Spector was born in Petah Tikva, in what was then Mandate Palestine, in 1940. His parents were both part of the Palmach, the elite strike force of the Haganah. His father, Zvi Spector, was the commander of Operation Boatswain, a failed 1941 Palmach mission in Lebanon that resulted in the deaths of all participants, and his mother, Shoshana Spector, was among the founding members of the Palmach and served as its adjutant officer. Spector grew up on kibbutz Givat Brenner and kibbutz Hulata.

Spector saw action in the Six-Day War, and was the commander involved in the Israeli airstrike on the USS Liberty that comprises the USS Liberty incident, in which 34 American crewmen were killed. As commander he maintained that he believed the ship was an enemy vessel and acted based on the intelligence available at the time.

In 1992 he was awarded the Yitzhak Sadeh Prize for his book A Dream In Blue And Black, a novelized account of a fighter squadron during the Yom Kippur War.

Since 2001, he has been active in the Movement for Disengagement from the Palestinians. In 2003, Spector was one of 27 reserve pilots and former pilots exempt from reserve duty to sign "The pilots' letter" refusing to fly missions against targets in the West Bank and Gaza.

== Publications ==
- Iftach Spector, Loud and Clear, Minneapolis, Zenith Press, 2009, 426 pp., ISBN 978-0-7603-3630-4 is his personal autobiography.

== See also ==
- Lists of flying aces in Arab–Israeli wars
