= 110 Squadron (Israel) =

Israeli military unit

- טייסת אבירי הצפון
- Knights of The North Squadron
- Country: Israel
- Branch: Israeli Air Force
- Role: Air Defence
- Garrison/HQ: Ramat David Airbase
- Motto(s): Knights of The North Squadron

Aircraft flown
- Fighter: F-16C

The 110 Squadron of the Israeli Air Force, also known as the Knights of The North Squadron, was an F-16A/B/C fighter squadron based at Ramat David Airbase, which was deactivated in 2017.

== See also ==
- No. 110 Squadron RAF
