= Flying ace =

Distinction given to fighter pilots

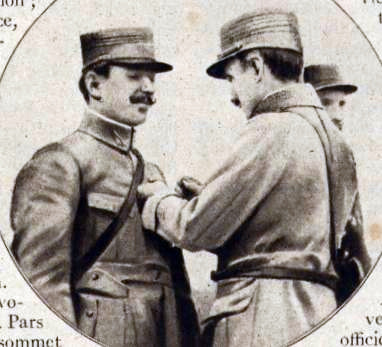
The first ace in history and "first French ace", Frenchman Adolphe Pégoud being awarded the Croix de guerre. He would die in a dogfight in 1915.

A flying ace, fighter ace or air ace is a military aviator credited with shooting down a certain minimum number of enemy aircraft during aerial combat; the exact number of aerial victories required to officially qualify as an ace varies, but is usually considered to be five or more.

The concept of the "ace" emerged in 1915 during World War I, at the same time as aerial dogfighting. It was a propaganda term intended to provide the home front with a cult of the hero in what was otherwise a war of attrition. The individual actions of aces were widely reported and the image was disseminated of the ace as a chivalrous knight reminiscent of a bygone era. For a brief early period when air-to-air combat was just being invented, the exceptionally skilled pilot could shape the battle in the skies. For most of the war, however, the image of the ace had little to do with the reality of air warfare, in which fighters fought in formation and air superiority depended heavily on the relative availability of resources. The use of the term ace to describe these pilots began in World War I, when French newspapers described Adolphe Pégoud, as l'As (the ace) after he became the first pilot to down five German aircraft.

The successes of such German ace pilots as Max Immelmann and Oswald Boelcke, and especially Manfred von Richthofen, the most victorious fighter pilot of the First World War, were well-publicized for the benefit of civilian morale, and the Pour le Mérite, Prussia's highest award for gallantry, became part of the uniform of a leading German ace. In the Luftstreitkräfte, the Pour le Mérite was nicknamed Der blaue Max/The Blue Max, after Max Immelmann, who was the first pilot to receive this award. Initially, German aviators had to destroy eight Allied aircraft to receive this medal. As the war progressed, the qualifications for Pour le Mérite were raised, but successful German fighter pilots continued to be hailed as national heroes for the remainder of the war.

The few aces among combat aviators have historically accounted for the majority of air-to-air victories in military history.

== History ==
=== World War I ===
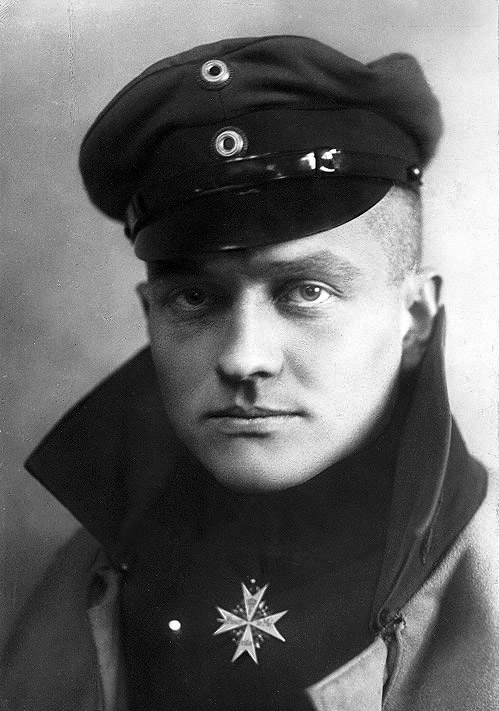
German Captain Manfred von Richthofen, known as the "Red Baron", scored the most officially accepted kills (80) in World War I and is arguably the most famous flying ace of all time.

World War I introduced the systematic use of true single-seat fighter aircraft, with enough speed and agility to catch and maintain contact with targets in the air, coupled with armament sufficiently powerful to destroy the targets. Aerial combat became a prominent feature with the Fokker Scourge, in the last half of 1915. This was also the beginning of a long-standing trend in warfare, showing statistically that approximately five percent of combat pilots account for the majority of air-to-air victories.

As the German fighter squadrons usually fought well within German lines, it was practicable to establish and maintain very strict guidelines for the official recognition of victory claims by German pilots. Shared victories were either credited to one of the pilots concerned or to the unit as a whole – the destruction of the aircraft had to be physically confirmed by locating its wreckage, or an independent witness to the destruction had to be found. Victories were also counted for aircraft forced down within German lines, as this usually resulted in the death or capture of the enemy aircrew.

Allied fighter pilots fought mostly in German-held airspace and were often not in a position to confirm that an enemy aircraft had crashed, so these victories were frequently claimed as "driven down", "forced to land", or "out of control" (called "probables" in later wars). These victories were usually included in a pilot's totals and citations for decorations.

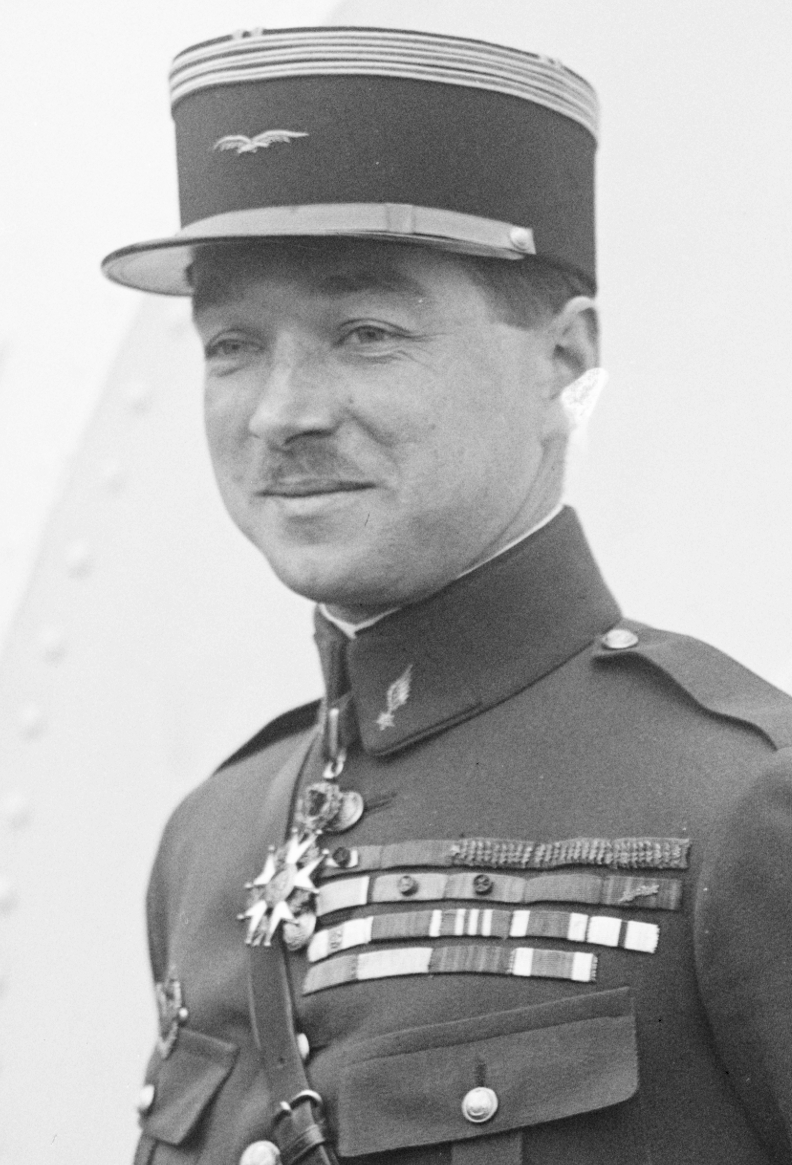
French Colonel René Fonck, to this day the highest-scoring Allied flying ace with 75 victories

The British high command considered the praise of fighter pilots to be detrimental to equally brave bombers and reconnaissance aircrew – so that the British air services did not publish official statistics on the successes of individuals. Nonetheless, some pilots did become famous through press coverage, making the British system for the recognition of successful fighter pilots much more informal and somewhat inconsistent. One pilot, Arthur Gould Lee, described his own score in a letter to his wife as "Eleven, five by me solo — the rest shared", adding that he was "miles from being an ace". This shows that his No. 46 Squadron RAF counted shared kills, but separately from "solo" ones—one of a number of factors that seems to have varied from unit to unit. Also evident is that Lee considered a higher figure than five kills to be necessary for "ace" status. Aviation historians credit him as an ace with two enemy aircraft destroyed and five driven down out of control, for a total of seven victories.

Other Allied countries, such as France and Italy, fell somewhere in between the very strict German approach and the relatively casual British one. They usually demanded independent witnessing of the destruction of an aircraft, making confirmation of victories scored in enemy territory very difficult. The Belgian crediting system sometimes included "out of control" to be counted as a victory.

The United States Army Air Service adopted French standards for evaluating victories, with two exceptions – during the summer 1918, while flying under the operational control of the British, the 17th Aero Squadron and the 148th Aero Squadron used British standards. American newsmen, in their correspondence to their papers, decided that five victories were the minimum needed to become an ace.

While "ace" status was generally won only by fighter pilots, bombers and reconnaissance crews on both sides also destroyed some enemy aircraft, typically in defending themselves from attack. The most notable example of a non-pilot ace in World War I is Charles George Gass with 39 accredited aerial victories.

=== Between the world wars ===
Between the two world wars two conflicts produced flying aces, the Spanish Civil War and the Second Sino-Japanese War.

The Spanish ace Joaquín García Morato scored 40 victories for the Nationalists during the Spanish Civil War. Part of the outside intervention in the war was the supply of "volunteer" foreign pilots to both sides. Russian and American aces joined the Republican air force, while the Nationalists included Germans and Italians.

The Soviet Volunteer Group began operations in the Second Sino-Japanese War as early as December 2, 1937, resulting in 28 Soviet aces. The Flying Tigers were American military pilots who were recruited sub rosa to aid the Chinese Nationalists. They spent the summer and autumn of 1941 in transit to China, and did not begin flying combat missions until December 20, 1941.

=== World War II ===
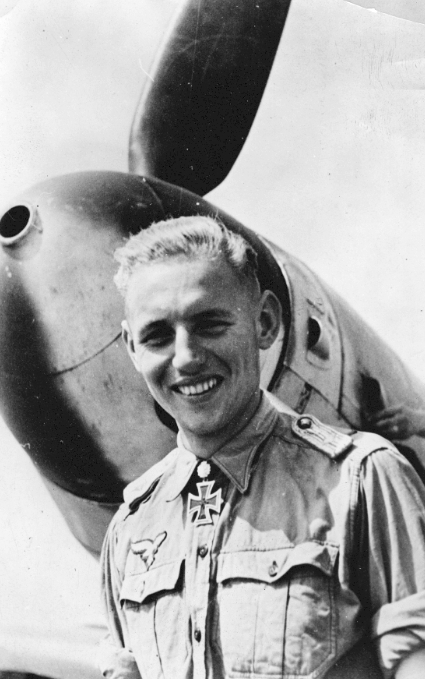
Erich Hartmann, with 352 official kills, by far the highest scoring fighter pilot of all time

In World War II many air forces adopted the British practice of crediting fractional shares of aerial victories, resulting in fractions or decimal scores, such as 11 1/2 or 26.83. Some U.S. commands also credited aircraft destroyed on the ground as equal to aerial victories. The Soviets distinguished between solo and group kills, as did the Japanese, though the Imperial Japanese Navy stopped crediting individual victories (in favor of squadron tallies) in 1943.

The Soviet Air Forces has the top Allied pilots in terms of aerial victories, Ivan Kozhedub credited with 64 victories and Alexander Pokryshkin scored 65 victories. It also claimed the only female aces of the war: Lydia Litvyak scored 12 victories and Yekaterina Budanova achieved 11. The highest scoring pilots from the Western allies against the German Luftwaffe were Johnnie Johnson (RAF, 38 kills) and Gabby Gabreski (USAAF, 28 kills in the air and 3 on the ground). In the Pacific theater Richard Bong became the top American fighter ace with 40 kills. In the Mediterranean theater Pat Pattle achieved at least 40 kills, mainly against Italian planes, and became the top fighter ace of the British Commonwealth in the war. Fighting on different sides, the French pilot Pierre Le Gloan had the unusual distinction of shooting down four German, seven Italian and seven British aircraft, the latter while he was flying for Vichy France in Syria.

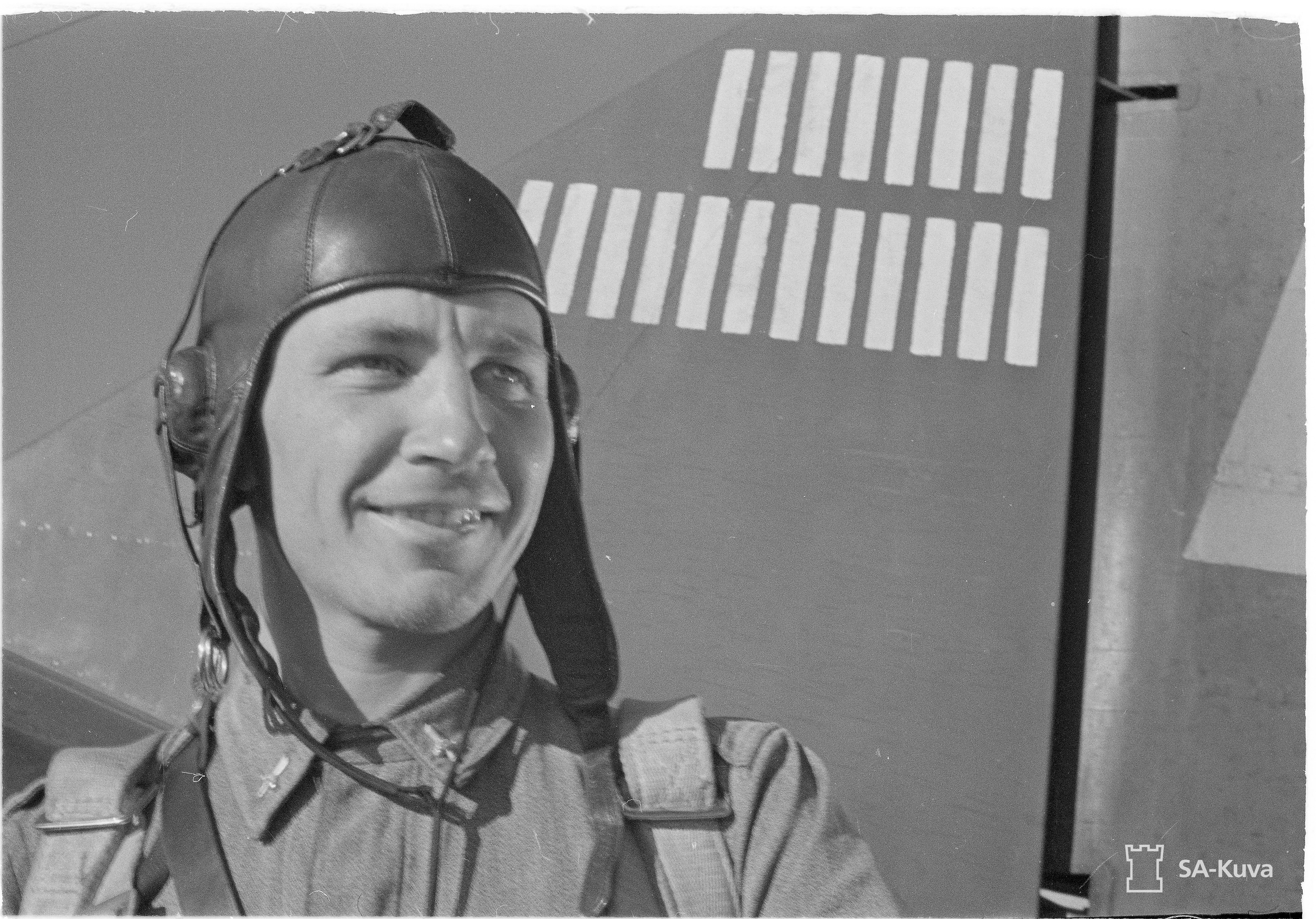
Ilmari Juutilainen, the top Finnish flying ace with 94 confirmed kills

The German Luftwaffe continued the tradition of "one pilot, one kill", and now referred to top scorers as Experten. (Note: For the award of decorations, the Germans initiated a points system to equal up achievements between the aces flying on the Eastern front with those on other, more demanding, fronts: one for a fighter, two for a twin-engine bomber, three for a four-engine bomber; night victories counted double; Mosquitoes counted double, due to the difficulty of bringing them down.) Some Luftwaffe pilots achieved very high scores, such as Erich Hartmann (352 kills) or Gerhard Barkhorn (301 kills). There were 107 German pilots with more than 100 kills. Most of these were won against the Soviet Air Force. The highest scoring fighter ace against Western allied forces were Hans-Joachim Marseille (158 kills) and Heinz Bär (208 kills, of which 124 in the west). Notable are also Heinz-Wolfgang Schnaufer, with 121 kills the highest-scoring night-fighter ace, and Werner Mölders, the first pilot to claim more than 100 kills in the history of aerial warfare. Pilots of other Axis powers also achieved high scores, such as Ilmari Juutilainen (Finnish Air Force, 94 kills), Constantin Cantacuzino (Romanian Air Force, 69 kills) or Mato Dukovac (Croatian Air Force, 44 kills). The highest scoring Japanese fighter pilot was Tetsuzō Iwamoto, who achieved 216 kills.

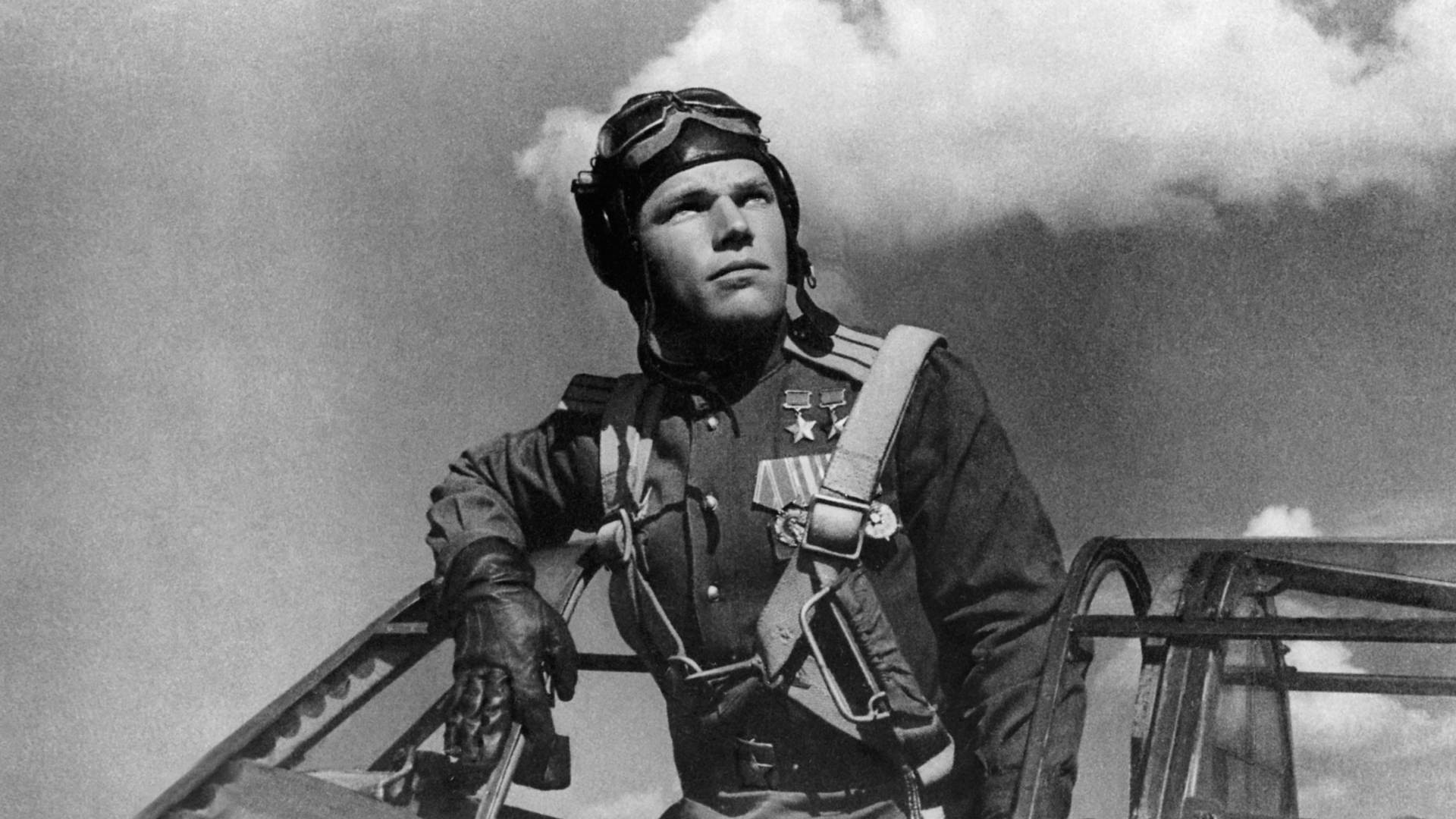
Ivan Kozhedub, the top Soviet and Allied flying ace in the war, with 60 solo victories to his credit

A number of factors probably contributed to the very high totals of the top German aces. For a limited period (especially during Operation Barbarossa), many Axis victories were over obsolescent aircraft and either poorly trained or inexperienced Allied pilots. In addition, Luftwaffe pilots generally flew many more individual sorties (sometimes well over 1000) than their Allied counterparts. Moreover, they often kept flying combat missions until they were captured, incapacitated, or killed, while successful Allied pilots were usually either promoted to positions involving less combat flying or routinely rotated back to training bases to pass their valuable combat knowledge to younger pilots. An imbalance in the number of targets available also contributed to the apparently lower numbers on the Allied side, since the number of operational Luftwaffe fighters was normally well below 1,500, with the total aircraft number never exceeding 5,000, and the total aircraft production of the Allies being nearly triple that of the other side. A difference in tactics might have been a factor as well; Erich Hartmann, for example, stated "See if there is a straggler or an uncertain pilot among the enemy... Shoot him down", which would have been an efficient and relatively low-risk way of increasing the number of kills. At the same time, the Soviet 1943 "Instruction For Air Combat" stated that the first priority must be the enemy commander, which was a much riskier task, but one giving the highest return in case of a success.

=== Post-World War II aces ===
==== Korean War ====
The Korean War of 1950–53 marked the transition from piston-engined propeller driven aircraft to more modern jet aircraft. As such, it saw the world's first jet-vs-jet aces. The highest scoring ace of the war is considered to be the Soviet pilot Nikolai Sutyagin who claimed 22 kills.

==== Vietnam War ====
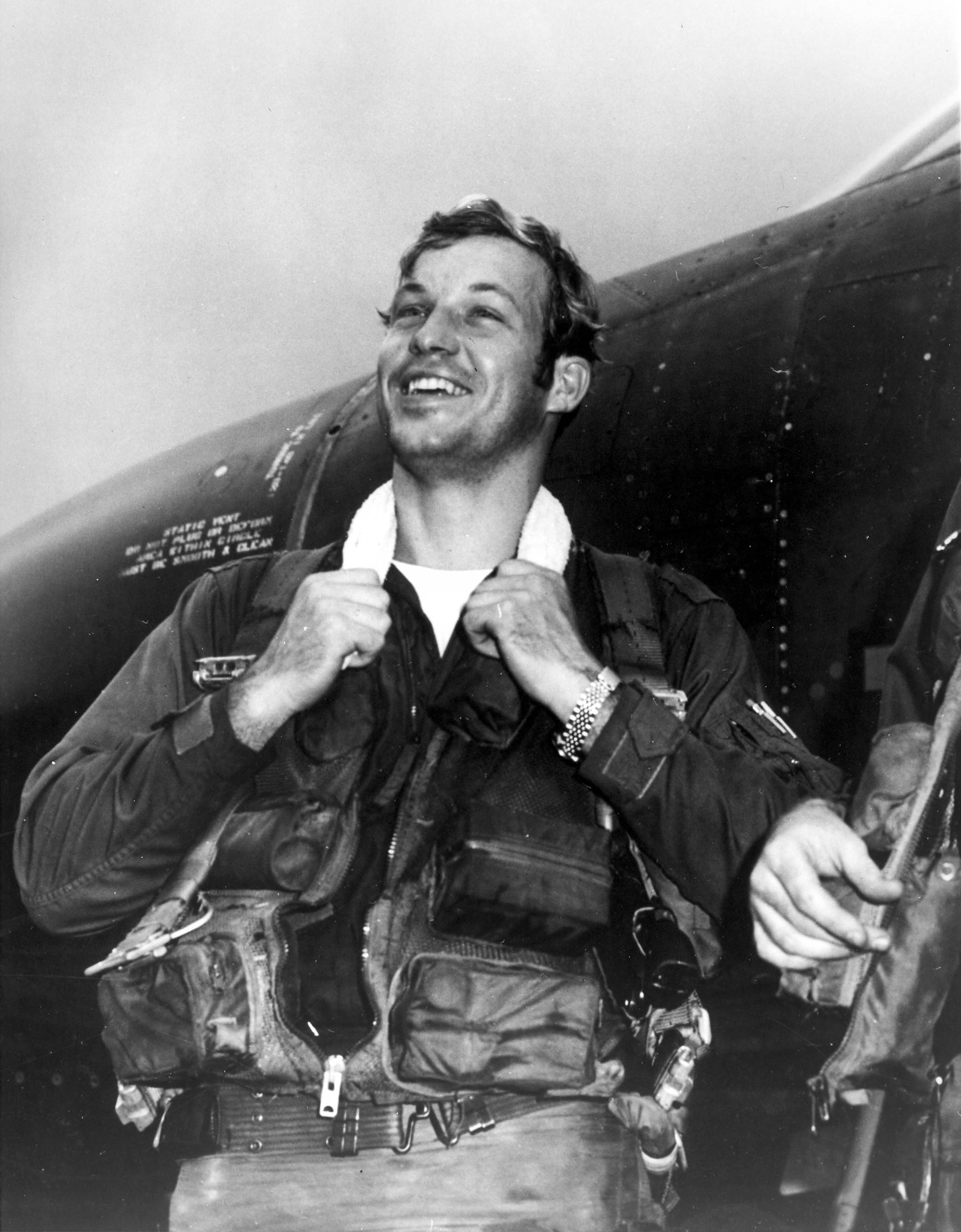
Capt. Richard Stephen Ritchie, 555th Tactical Fighter Squadron, pictured beside the aircraft in which he became the first Air Force ace of the Vietnam War

The Vietnam People's Air Force had begun development of its modern air-forces, primarily trained by Czechoslovak and Soviet trainers since 1956. The outbreak of the largest sustained bombardment campaign in history prompted rapid deployment of the nascent air-force, and the first engagement of the war was in April 1965 at Thanh Hóa Bridge which saw relatively outdated subsonic MiG-17 units thrown against technically superior F-105 Thunderchief and F-8 Crusader, damaging 1 F-8 and killing two F-105 jets. The MiG-17 generally did not have sophisticated radars and missiles and relied on dog-fighting and maneuverability to score kills on US aircraft. Since US aircraft heavily outnumbered North Vietnamese ones, the Warsaw Pact and others had begun arming North Vietnam with MiG-21 jets. The VPAF had adopted a strategy of "guerrilla warfare in the sky" utilizing quick hit-and-run attacks against US targets, continually flying low and forcing faster, more heavily armed US jets to engage in dog-fighting where the MiG-17 and MiG-21 had superior maneuverability. The VPAF had carried out the first air-raid on US ships since WW2, with two aces including Nguyễn Văn Bảy attacking US ships during the Battle of Đồng Hới in 1972. Quite often air-to-air losses of US fighter jets were re-attributed to surface-to-air missiles, as it was considered "less embarrassing". By the war's end, the US had nevertheless confirmed 249 air-to-air US aircraft losses while the figures for North Vietnam are disputed, ranging from 195 North Vietnamese aircraft from US claims to 131 from Soviet, North Vietnamese and allied records.

American air-to-air combat during the Vietnam War generally matched intruding United States fighter-bombers against radar-directed integrated North Vietnamese air defense systems. American F-4 Phantom II, F-8 Crusader and F-105 fighter crews usually had to contend with surface-to-air missiles and anti-aircraft artillery before opposing fighters attacked them. The long-running conflict produced 22 aces: 17 North Vietnamese pilots, two American pilots, three American weapon systems officers or WSOs (WSO is the USAF designation, one of the three was actually a US Naval aviator, with an equivalent job, but using the USN designation of Radar Intercept Officer or RIO).

==== Arab–Israeli war ====
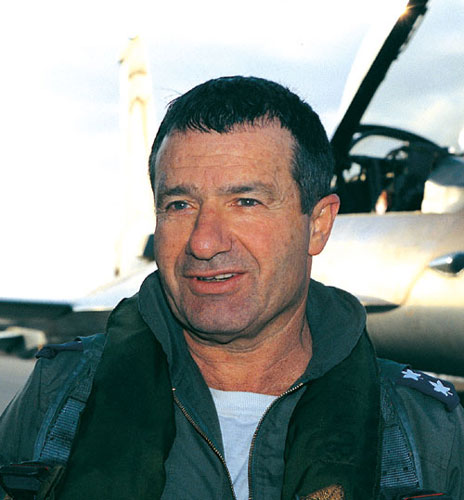
Giora Epstein, the highest scoring flying ace in the Israeli Air Force with 17 aerial victories

The series of wars and conflicts between Israel and its neighbors began with Israeli independence in 1948 and continued for over three decades.

==== Iran–Iraq war ====
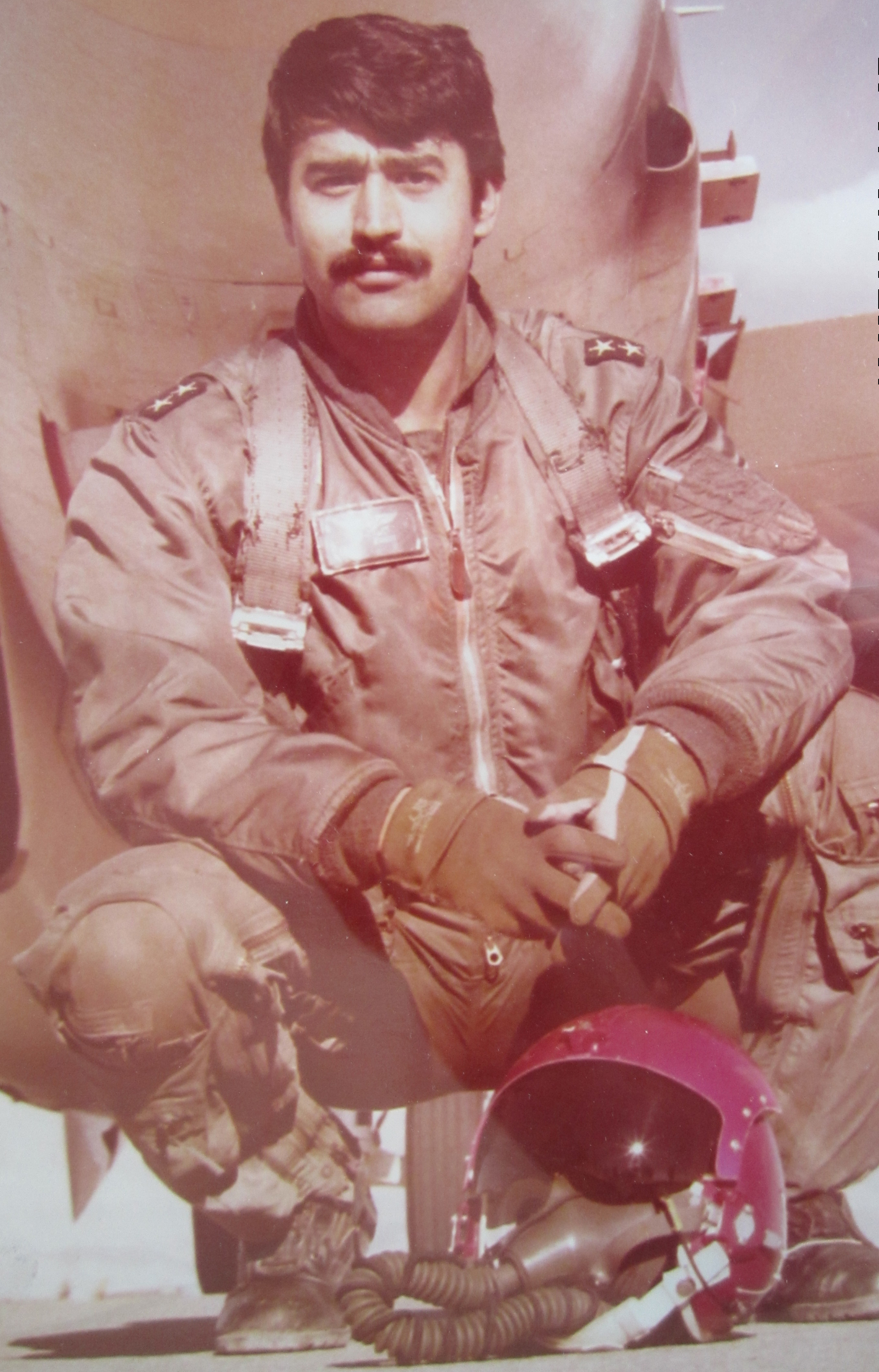
Brig. General Jalil Zandi, an ace fighter pilot in the Iranian Air Force. The most successful F-14 Tomcat pilot ever with eight confirmed kills during the Iran-Iraq war.

Brig. General Jalil Zandi (1951–2001) was an ace fighter pilot in the Islamic Republic of Iran Air Force, serving for the full duration of the Iran–Iraq War. His record of eight confirmed and three probable victories against Iraqi combat aircraft qualifies him as an ace and the most successful pilot of that conflict and the most successful Grumman F-14 Tomcat pilot worldwide.

Brig. General Shahram Rostami was another Iranian ace. He was also an F-14 pilot. He had six confirmed kills. His victories include one MiG-21, two MiG-25s, and three Mirage F1s.

Colonel Mohammed Rayyan was an Iraqi ace fighter pilot who shot down 10 Iranian aircraft, mostly F-4 Phantoms during the war.

==== Indo-Pakistan War ====
Air Commodore Muhammad Mahmood Alam was an ace fighter pilot in the Pakistan Air Force. During the Indo-Pakistani War of 1965, Alam claimed to have downed five aircraft in a single sortie on 7 September 1965 with four downed in less than a minute, establishing a world record. These claims, however, have been widely contested but never substantiated by Indian Air Force officials.

==== Iran–Israel war ====
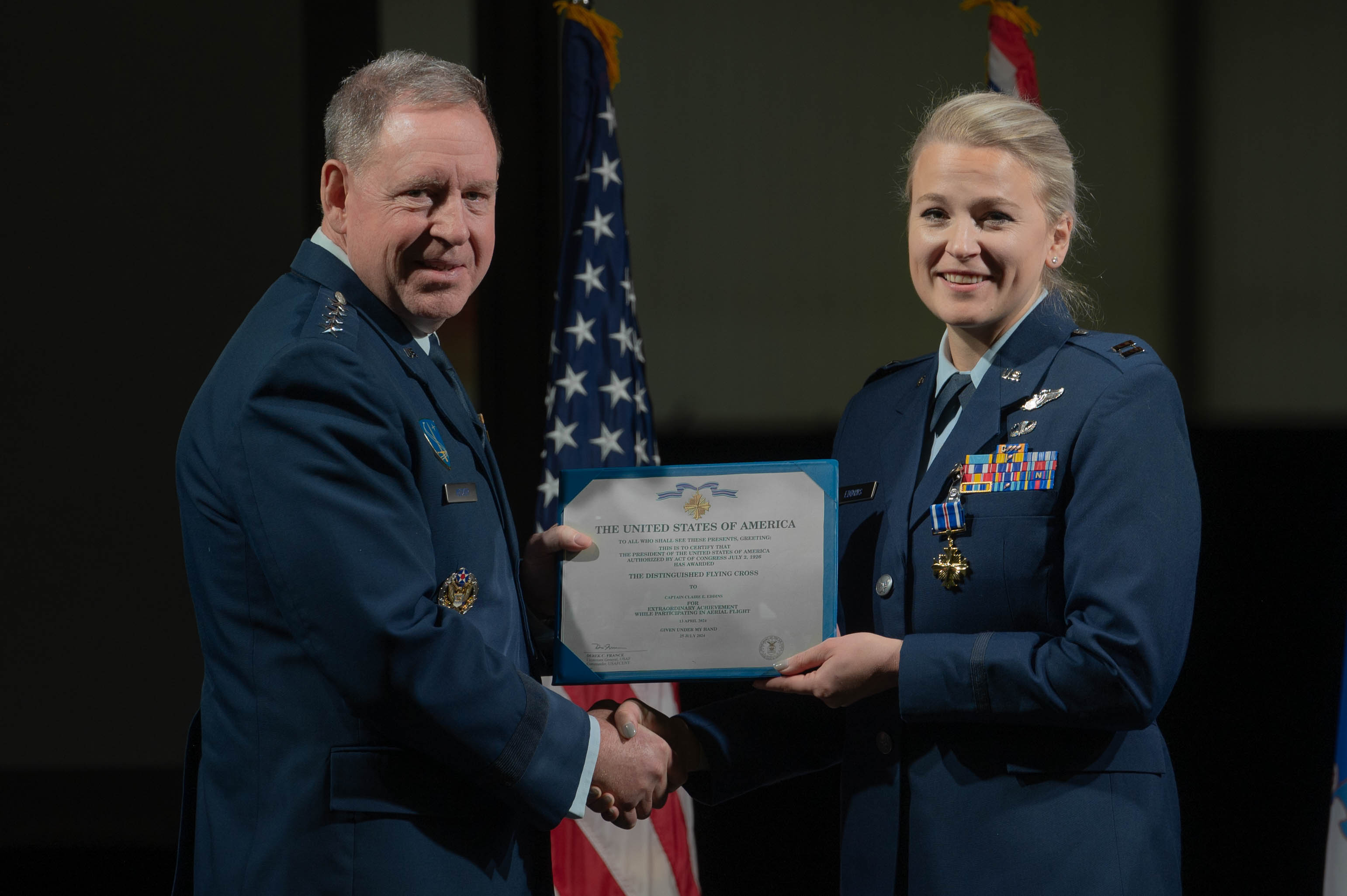
Capt. Claire Eddins, 494th Fighter Squadron, receiving the Distinguished Flying Cross for actions on 13 April 2024 downing Iranian drones.

United States Air Force F-15E pilot Capt. Claire “Atomic” Eddins and Weapons System Officer (WSO) Capt. Carla Nava shot down five Iranian drones during an attack on Israel on 13 April 2024. They became aces in a day and the first all-female crew to become flying aces in history. They were both awarded the Distinguished Flying Cross for their actions.

In the same engagement, Maj. Benjamin Coffey and WSO Capt. Lacie Hester shot down six Iranian drones; they both received the Silver Star for their efforts. In the Red Sea, Lt. Col. William “Skate” Parks was credited with 6 aerial victories while operating against Houthi forces who were targeting the carrier USS Harry S. Truman (CVN-75).

== Accuracy ==
Realistic assessment of enemy casualties is important for intelligence purposes, so most air forces expend considerable effort to ensure accuracy in victory claims. In World War II, the aircraft gun camera came into general usage by the Luftwaffe as well as the RAF and USAAF, partly in hope of alleviating inaccurate victory claims.

=== World War I aerial victory accuracy ===
In World War I the standards for confirmation of aerial victories were developed. The most strict were the German and French ones which required both the existence of traceable wrecks or observations of independent observers. In contrast to this, the British system also accepted single claims of the pilots and deeds such as enemy planes "out of control", "driven down" and "forced to land". Aerial victories were also divided among different pilots. This led to vast overclaims on the British and partially on the American side. Some air forces, such as the USAAF, also included kills on the ground as victories.

The most accurate figures usually belong to the air arm fighting over its own territory, where many wrecks can be located, and even identified, and where shot down enemy aircrews are either killed or captured. It is for this reason that at least 76 of the 80 aircraft credited to Manfred von Richthofen can be tied to known British losses. The German Jagdstaffeln flew defensively, on their own side of the lines, in part due to General Hugh Trenchard's policy of offensive patrol.

=== World War II aerial victory accuracy ===
In World War II overclaims were a common problem. Nearly 50% of Royal Air Force (RAF) victories in the Battle of Britain, for instance, do not tally statistically with recorded German losses; but at least some of this apparent over-claiming can be tallied with known wrecks, and German aircrew known to have been in British PoW camps. An overclaim ratio of about 2-3 was common on all sides, and Soviet overclaims were sometimes higher. The claims of the Luftwaffe pilots are considered as mostly reasonable and more accurate than those according to the British and American system.

To quote an extreme example, in the Korean War, both the U.S. and Communist air arms claimed a 10-to-1 victory/loss ratio.

== Non-pilot aces ==
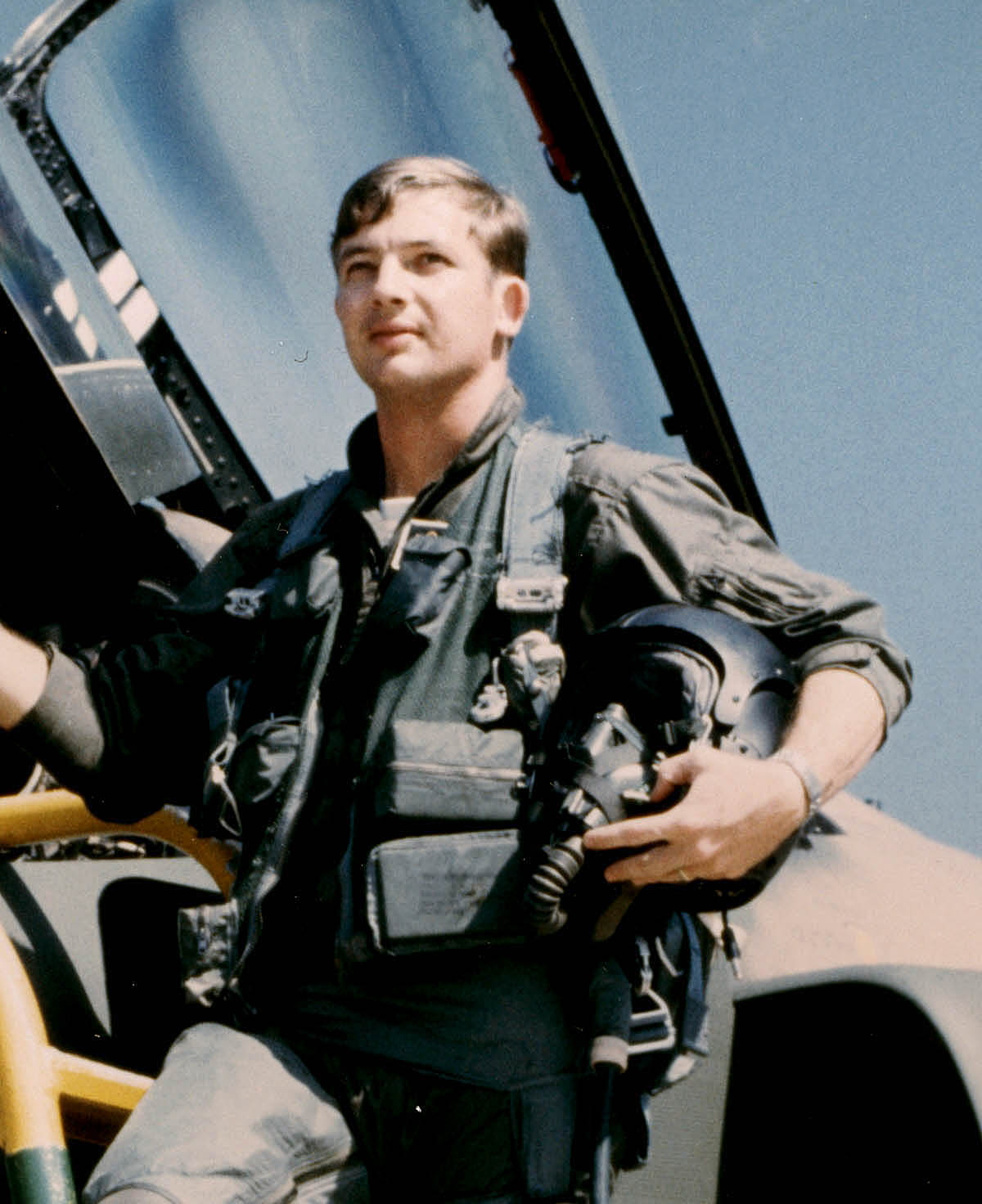
Charles B. DeBellevue, the first USAF weapon systems officer to become a flying ace

While aces are generally thought of exclusively as fighter pilots, some have accorded this status to gunners on bombers or reconnaissance aircraft, observers in two-seater fighters such as the early Bristol F.2b, and navigators/weapons officers in jet aircraft such as the McDonnell Douglas F-4 Phantom II. Because pilots often teamed with different air crew members, an observer or gunner might be an ace while his pilot is not, or vice versa. Observer aces constitute a sizable minority in many lists.

In World War I, the observer Gottfried Ehmann of the German Luftstreitkräfte was credited with 12 kills, for which he was awarded the Golden Military Merit Cross. In the Royal Flying Corps the observer Charles George Gass tallied 39 victories, of which 5 were actually confirmed. The spread was caused by the lavish British system of aerial victory confirmation.

In World War II, United States Army Air Forces S/Sgt. Michael Arooth, a Boeing B-17 Flying Fortress tail gunner serving in the 379th Bombardment Group, was credited with 19 kills and the Consolidated B-24 Liberator gunner Arthur J. Benko (374th Bombardment Squadron) with 16 kills. The Royal Air Force's leading bomber gunner, Wallace McIntosh, was credited with eight kills while serving as a rear turret gunner on Avro Lancasters, including three on one mission. Flight Sergeant F. J. Barker contributed to 12 victories while flying as a gunner in a Boulton Paul Defiant turret-equipped fighter piloted by Flight Sergeant E. R. Thorne. On the German side, Erwin Hentschel, the Junkers Ju 87 rear gunner of Luftwaffe pilot and anti-tank ace Hans-Ulrich Rudel, had 7 confirmed kills. The crew of the bomber pilot Otto Köhnke from Kampfgeschwader 3 is credited with the destruction of 11 enemy fighters (6 French, 1 British, 4 Soviet).

With the advent of more advanced technology, a third category of ace appeared. Charles B. DeBellevue became not only the first U.S. Air Force weapon systems officer (WSO) to become an ace but also the top American ace of the Vietnam War, with six victories. Close behind with five were fellow WSO Jeffrey Feinstein and Radar Intercept Officer William P. Driscoll.

== Ace in a day ==
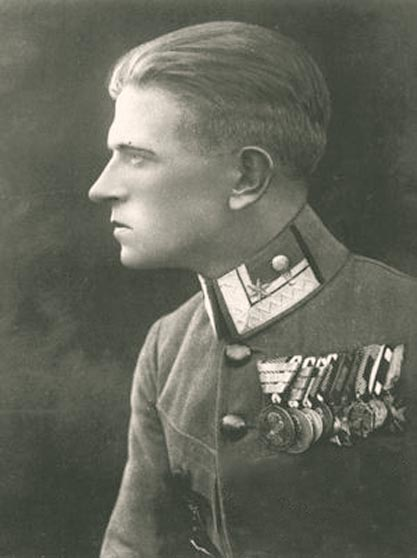
Julius Arigi, the first "ace in a day"

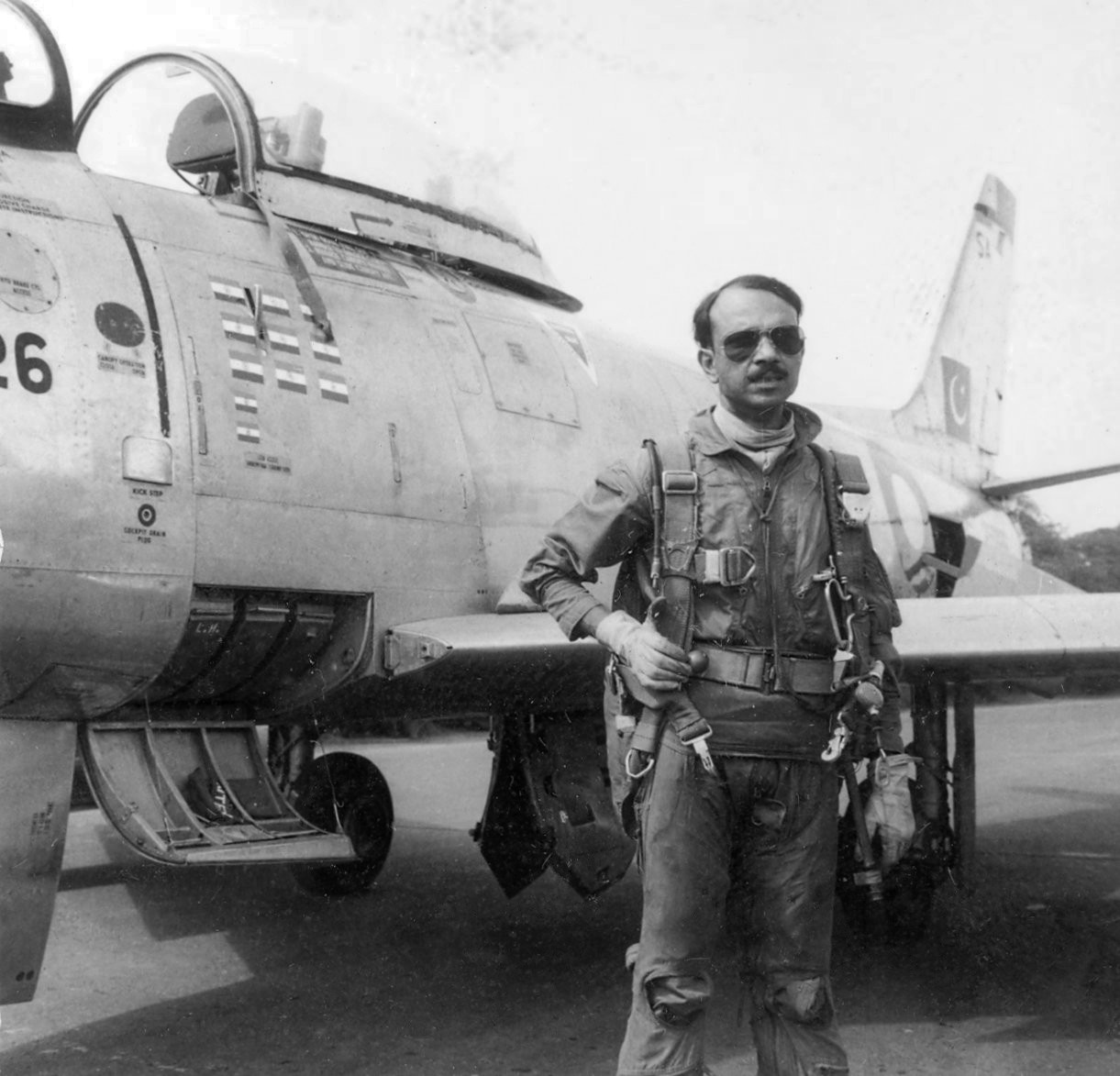
M.M Alam poses with his F-86 Sabre. ace-in-a-day on 7 September 1965.

The first military aviators to score five or more victories on the same date, thus each becoming an "ace in a day", were pilot Julius Arigi and observer/gunner Johann Lasi of the Austro-Hungarian air force, on August 22, 1916, when they downed five Italian aircraft. The feat was repeated five more times during World War I.

Becoming an ace in a day became relatively common during World War II. A total of 68 U.S. pilots (43 Army Air Forces, 18 Navy, and seven Marine Corps pilots) were credited with the feat, including legendary test pilot Chuck Yeager.

In the Soviet offensive of 1944 in the Karelian Isthmus, Finnish pilot Hans Wind shot down 30 Soviet aircraft in 12 days with his Bf 109 G. In doing so, he obtained "ace in a day" status three times.

During the Indo-Pakistani War of 1965, Pakistani pilot Muhammad Mahmood Alam claimed to have downed five aircraft in a single sortie on 7 September 1965 with four downed in less than a minute, establishing a world record. According to some sources Alam is the only ace-in-a-day achiever in the jet age. These claims, however, have been contested by the Indian Air Force.

== See also ==
- Fighter aircraft
- Iraqi aerial victories during the Iran–Iraq war
- Light fighter
- List of aces of aces
- List of Egyptian flying aces
- List of German World War II jet aces
- List of Iranian aerial victories during the Iran–Iraq war
- List of Israeli flying aces
- List of Korean War flying aces
- List of Spanish Civil War flying aces
- List of Syrian flying aces
- List of Vietnam War flying aces
- List of World War I flying aces
- List of World War II flying aces
- Lists of flying aces in Arab–Israeli wars
- Panzer ace
- Ace Combat

== Bibliography ==
- Belich, Jamie. "Ace, air combat". Richard Holmes, Charles Singleton and Spencer Jones, eds. The Oxford Companion to Military History. Oxford University Press, 2001 [online 2004].
- Bergström, Christer. Barbarossa: The Air Battle, July–December 1941. Birmingham, UK: Classic Publications, 2007. ISBN 978-1-85780-270-2.
- Dunnigan, James F. How to Make War: A Comprehensive Guide to Modern Warfare in the Twenty-first Century. New York: HarperCollins, 2003. ISBN 978-0-06009-012-8.
- Farr, Finis. Rickenbacker's Luck: An American Life. New York: Houghton Mifflin, 1979. ISBN 978-0-395-27102-5.
- Franks, Norman and Frank W. Bailey. Over the Front: A Complete Record of the Fighter Aces and Units of the United States and French Air Services, 1914–1918. London: Grub Street, 1992. ISBN 978-0-948817-54-0.
- Franks, Norman, Frank W. Bailey and Russell Guest. Above the Lines: The Aces and Fighter Units of the German Air Service, Naval Air Service and Flanders Marine Corps, 1914–1918. London: Grub Street, 1993. ISBN 978-0-94881-773-1.
- ———; Guest, Russell; Alegi, Gregory (1997), Above the War Fronts: The British Two-seater Bomber Pilot and Observer Aces, the British Two-seater Fighter Observer Aces, and the Belgian, Italian, Austro-Hungarian and Russian Fighter Aces, 1914–1918, Fighting Airmen of WWI, vol. 4, London: Grub Street, ISBN 978-1-898697-56-5.
- Galland, Adolf The First and the Last London, Methuen, 1955 (Die Ersten und die Letzten Germany, Franz Schneekluth, 1953).
- Goll, Nicole-Melanie (2011). "Godwin von Brumowski (1889–1936): The Construction of an Austro-Hungarian War Hero during World War I". In Marija Wakounig; Karlo Ruzicic-Kessler (eds.). From the Industrial Revolution to World War II in East Central Europe. LIT Verlag. pp. 139–56. ISBN 978-3643901293.
- Guttman, Jon. Pusher Aces of World War 1. London: Osprey, 2009. ISBN 978-1-84603-417-6.
- Hobson, Chris. Vietnam Air Losses, USAF, USN, USMC, Fixed-Wing Aircraft Losses in Southeast Asia 1961–1973. North Branch, Minnesota: Specialty Press, 2001. ISBN 1-85780-115-6.
- Johnson, J. E. Wing Leader. London: Ballantine, 1967.
- Lake, Jon (2000). The Battle of Britain. Leicester: Amereon Limited. ISBN 1-85605-535-3.
- Lee, Arthur Gould. No Parachute. London: Jarrolds, 1968.
- O'Connor, Martin. Air Aces of the Austro-Hungarian Empire 1914–1918. Boulder, Colorado: Flying Machine Press, 1986. ISBN 978-1-89126-806-9.
- Pieters, Walter M. Above Flanders' Fields: A Complete Record of the Belgian Fighter Pilots and Their Units During the Great War, 1914–1918. London: Grub Street, 1998. ISBN 978-1-898697-83-1.
- Robertson, Linda R. (2005). The Dream of Civilized Warfare: World War I Flying Aces and the American Imagination . University of Minnesota Press. ISBN 0816642710, ISBN 978-0816642717
- Robinson, Bruce (ed.) von Richthofen and the Flying Circus. Letchworth, UK: Harleyford, 1958.
- Shores, Christopher. Air Aces. Greenwich Connecticut: Bison Books, 1983. ISBN 0-86124-104-5
- ———; Franks, Norman; Guest, Russell (1990), Above the Trenches: A Complete Record of the Fighter Aces and Units of the British Empire Air Forces 1915–1920, London: Grub Street, ISBN 978-0-948817-19-9.
- Stenman, Kari and Kalevi Keskinen. Finnish Aces of World War 2 (Osprey Aircraft of the Aces, number 23). London: Osprey Publishing. 1998. ISBN 952-5186-24-5.
- Thomas, Andrew. Defiant, Blenheim and Havoc Aces. London: Osprey Publishing, 2012. ISBN 978-1-84908-666-0.
- Toliver, Raymond J. and Trevor J. Constable. Horrido!: Fighter Aces of the Luftwaffe. London: Bantam Books, 1979. ISBN 978-0-55312-663-1.
- Toperczer, Istvan. MIG-17 and MIG-19 Units of the Vietnam War (Osprey Combat Aircraft, number 25). London: Osprey, 2001. ISBN 978-1-84176-162-6.
- ——— (2001), MIG-21 Units of the Vietnam War, Combat Aircraft, London: Osprey, ISBN 978-1-84176-263-0.
