= 107 Squadron (Israel) =

Israeli military unit

Squadron 107
- טייסת אבירי הזנב הכתום
- Knights of the Orange Tail
- Active: January 1953-1954, 1960s-present
- Country: Israel
- Branch: Israeli Air Force
- Role: Air Defence
- Garrison/HQ: Hatzerim Airbase
- Motto: Knights of the Orange Tail

Aircraft flown
- Fighter: F-16I Sufa

Squadron 107 (Hebrew: טייסת 107), also known as the "Knights of the Orange Tail Squadron", is a fighter aircraft squadron in the Israeli Air Force. The squadron operates F-16I ("Sufa") aircraft from the Hatzerim Airbase in the Negev.

== History ==
The squadron was established on January 25, 1953 as a Spitfire squadron at the Ramat David base under the name "Third Spitfire Squadron", and was mainly used for the advanced training course. In December 1953, the squadron became a reserve squadron. In April 1954, the squadron was converted to a P-51 Mustang squadron.

In June 1956, the Mustangs were transferred to the 105 Squadron. In their place the Spitfires of the 105 Squadron, intended for operation by the squadron in an emergency, were received. In September 1956, the squadron was closed due to the withdrawal of the Spitfires from service in the Israeli Air Force. Most of them were sold to Burma.

In February 1962, the squadron reopened at the Ramat David base and received Meteor aircraft from Squadron 117 ("the first jet squadron"), which was about to receive the new Mirage 3C aircraft. In July 1963, they were joined by additional Meteor aircraft for training (NF-13) from Squadron 119 (the "Bat Squadron"). In August 1964 the squadron was closed. The Meteor 13,9,8 models were taken out of service, and the two-seater Meteor planes were transferred to Squadron 110 ("The Knights of the North Squadron"), for training purposes.

On September 15, 1965, the squadron was reopened as an Ouragan aircraft squadron at the Ramat David base under the command of Amichai Shmueli. The squadron was composed mainly of young pilots, who came straight from the operational training course. Two weeks before the Six Day War, the squadron was deployed at the Lod Air Force Base, so that the short-range Ouragan planes would have an easier time reaching the Egyptian front.

During the war, the squadron operated under the command of Major Jacob Turner and during the course of it carried out attacks on airfields and radar posts in Egypt and Jordan. The squadron participated in attacking ground forces, artillery batteries and anti-aircraft positions and carried out missions to prevent enemy convoys in all combat sectors. The squadron had no casualties during the war.

In July 1967, the squadron was closed, and its planes joined the Ouragan planes in Squadron 113 ("The Wasp Squadron"). On December 1, 1971, the squadron was re-opened as an F-4 Phantom ("Kurnass") squadron under the name "Knights of the Orange Tail Squadron" at the Hatzerim Airbase, and its first commander was Iftach Spector. The squadron began to receive the Phantom planes starting on December 10 of that year.

On January 2, 1973, six Syrian MiG-21 jets were launched at an Israeli Mirage jet that was making a photograph sortie in southern Lebanon. It was the first time that Syrian planes were launched to intercept Israeli Air Force planes over Lebanese soil. A four-ship formation of Phantom planes on patrol near the border were directed at the MiGs and a dogfight ensued. During the battle, one of the Phantom planes chased after one of the MiGs, and at one point the two planes entered a spiral dive, at the end of which the MiG hit the ground. This was the first shoot-down credited to the squadron.

On September 13, 1973, in air battles that developed following a photographic sortie over Syria, 12 Syrian MiGs were shot down by Israeli Air Force planes and one Israeli Mirage plane was lost. 107 Squadron was responsible for downing three MiGs.

In the Yom Kippur War, the squadron under the command of Iftach Spector participated in dozens of operational sorties. In total, the Phantom planes of the squadron shot down 14 enemy aircraft. The squadron participated in the operation to attack the Syrian General Staff HQ, however, due to heavy clouds along their flight path, Spector and the two Phantom four-ships under his command were unable to carry out the attack mission assigned to them, and turned to return to Israel.

During their return, their commander, Spector, insisted that they would find another target to attack, and they attacked Syrian armored forces in the south of the Golan Heights. Another force, from Squadron 119, carried out the mission of bombing the General Staff HQ successfully that day after he managed to find a breach in the clouds and reach the target. Although Spector's decision to avoid an attack under circumstances that were supported by the commander of the Air Force, it drew criticism and sparked an internal debate in the Israeli Air Force. On the seventh day of the war, 12 F-4 Phantom ("Kurnass") aircraft of the squadron participated in a complex attack on the Tanta airport, about a hundred kilometers north of Cairo.

Throughout the Yom Kippur War, squadron 107 carried out 760 combat sorties, of which 42 were under Spector's command. Four of its planes were shot down, but it suffered no casualties. During the war, a plane belonging to the squadron was accidentally shot down by an Israeli IAI Nesher pilot, Yair Sela. The pilot Uri Bekel and the navigator Gilad Rosenblatt parachuted safely and were rescued to the base.

In Operation Litani, a Phantom plane of the squadron flown by Danny Halutz was hit by an SA-7 missile, but despite the hit, managed to land safely at the Ramat David base.

In Operation Shlom HaGalil Yitzhak Gat commanded the squadron, the squadron participated in Operation Artsav-19, later in the war a member of the squadron was involved in the bombing of the forces of the 943rd Brigade - the most serious friendly fire incident in the history of the IDF, in which 24 soldiers were killed and about 100 were wounded.

In 1991, Lt. Col. Yochanan Luker was appointed squadron commander and was thus the first Navigator/WSO in the Air Force to command an operational fighter squadron.

The Phantoms served in the squadron for 26 years and accumulated a total of 32 air-to-air kills.

In September 2005, the squadron's re-establishment team began operations as an F-16I ("Sufa") squadron. On July 5, 2006, the squadron was reopened as an F-16I ("Sufa") squadron at the Hatzerim Airbase. 107 is the third "storm" squadron established after squadron 253 ("the Negev squadron") and squadron 119 ("the bat squadron") which were stationed at the Ramon Airbase. Immediately after its establishment, the squadron under the command of Tal Kalman already participated in attack sorties during the Second Lebanon War.

At the end of December 2008, F-16I aircraft of the squadron attacked hundreds of terrorist targets in the Gaza Strip as part of Operation Cast Lead. In mid-November 2012, the squadron's F-16I aircraft attacked hundreds of terrorist targets in the Gaza Strip as part of Operation Pillar of Defense.

On July 7, 2013, a plane from the squadron crashed, this plane was the "flagship plane" of the squadron since its tail number was 107.

In May 2018, the squadron participated in Operation House of Cards in which they operated against the Quds Force in Syria.

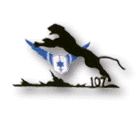
The first insignia of the squadron, the leaping panther insignia during the "Third Spitfire Squadron

== Gallery ==
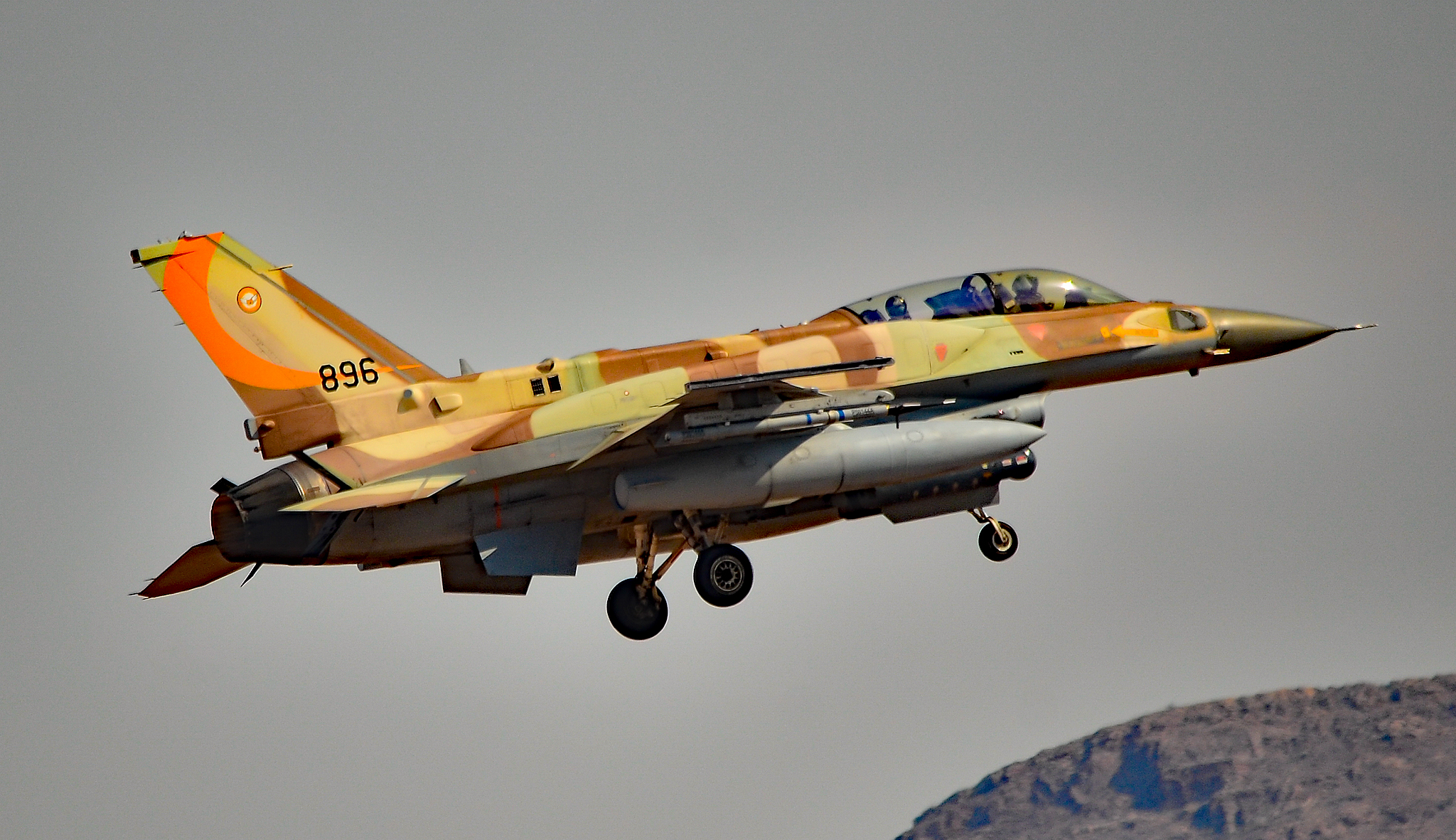
An F-16I of the 107th squadron

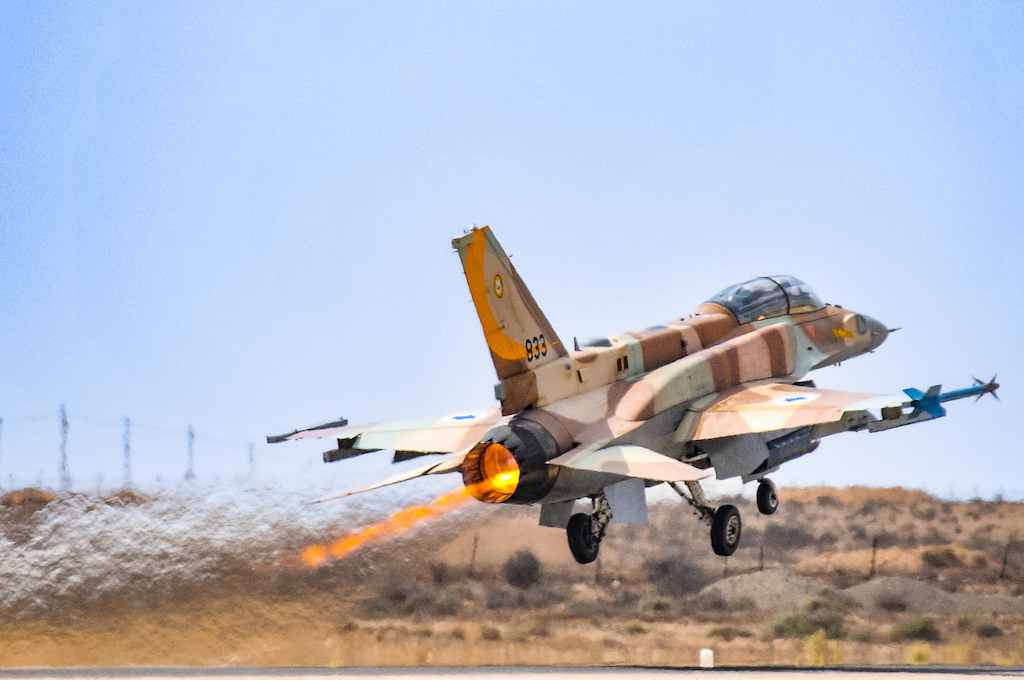
F-16 '831' of the Squadron

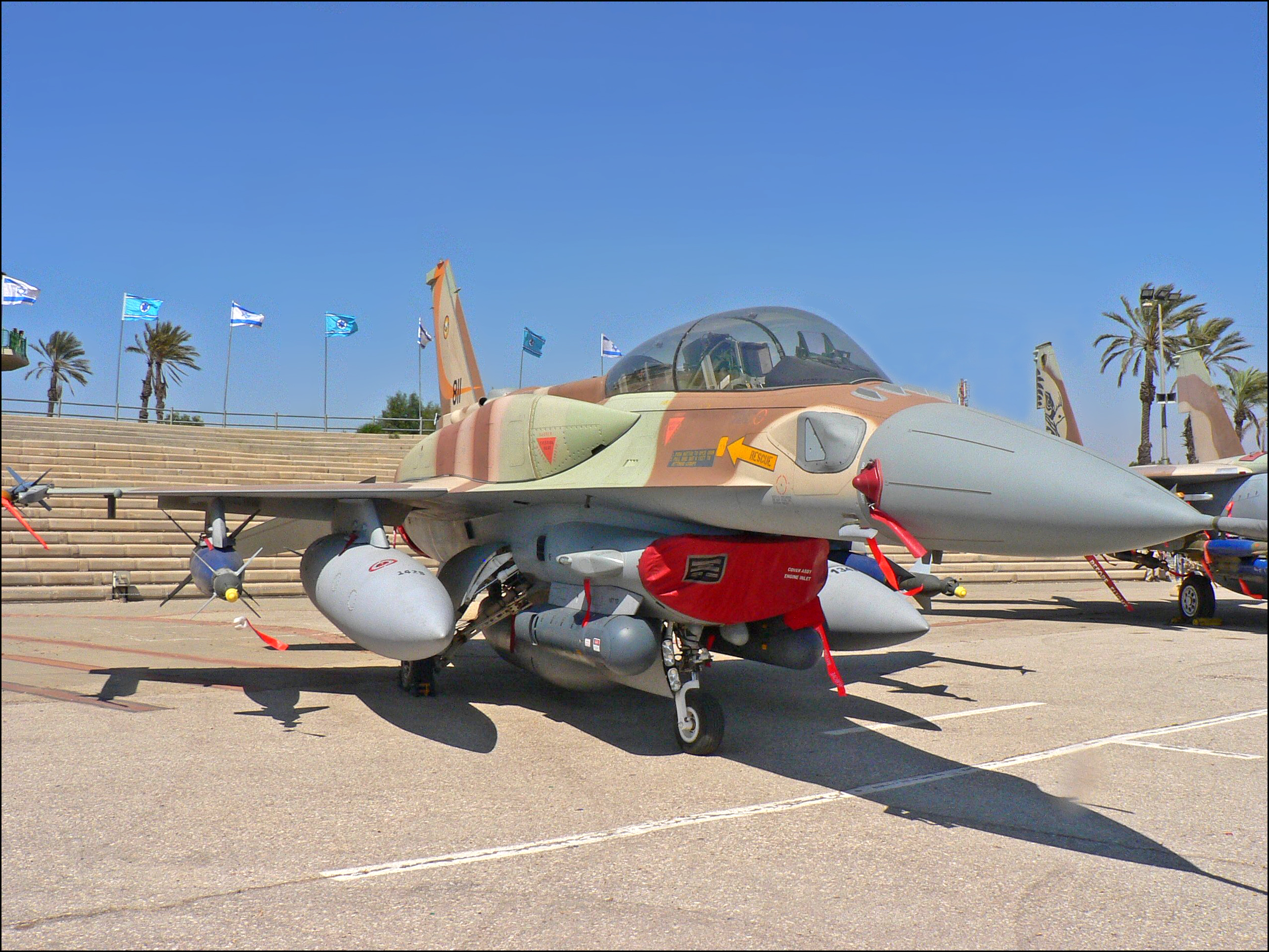
F-16 '811' of the Squadron

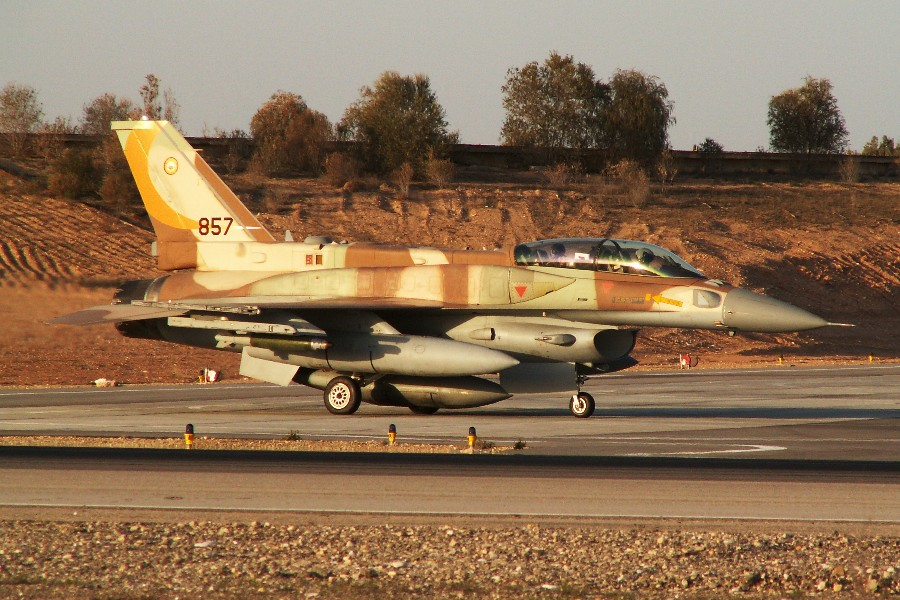
Squadron Aircraft during Operation Cast Lead

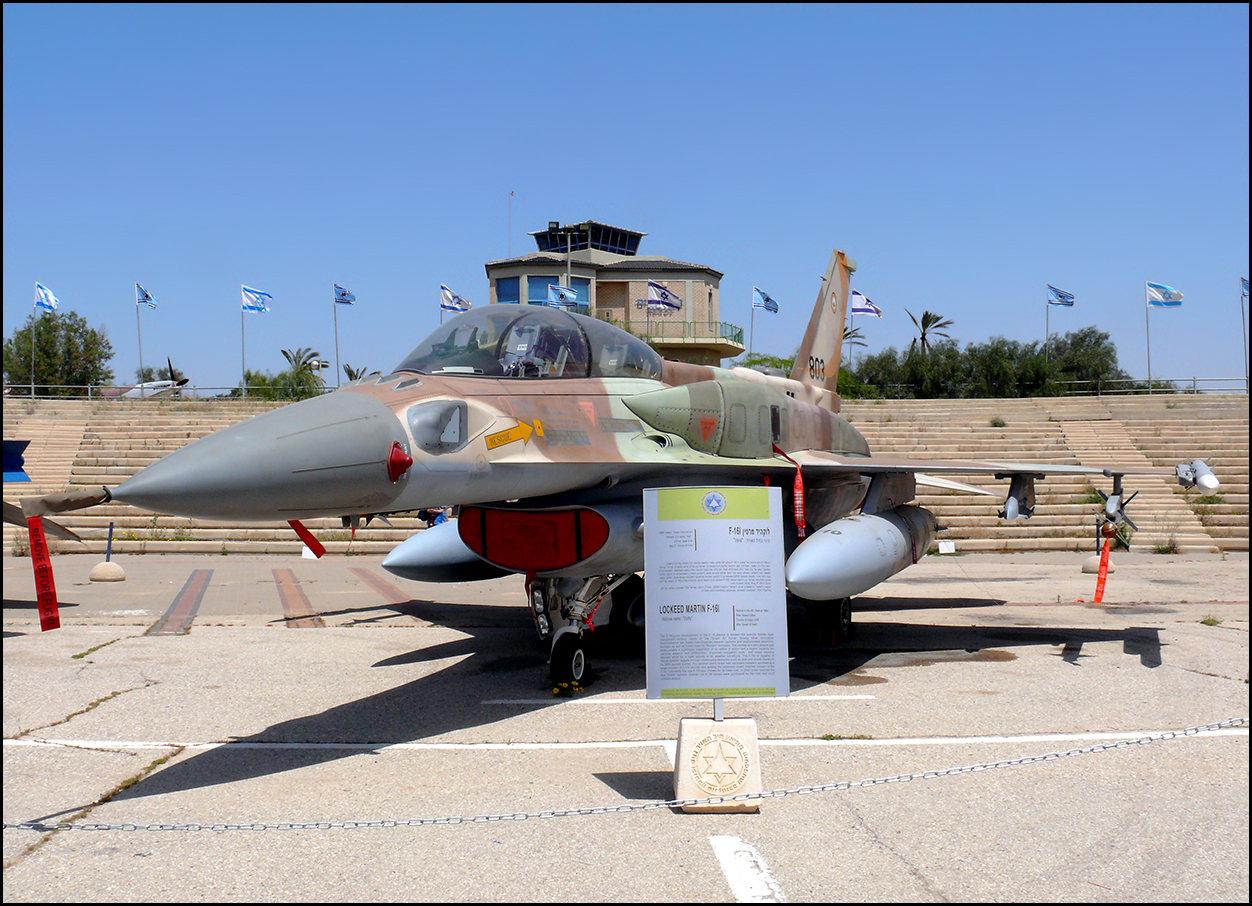
F-16 '803' of the squadron
