= Operation Shayar 265 =

1970 Israeli aerial operation in Egypt

Shayar 265
- Part of the War of Attrition
Date	3 August 1970
Location	Between Abu Suweir and Ismailia, west of Suez Canal
Result	Soviet victory

Belligerents
Israel	Soviet Union

Commanders and leaders
Yigal Shohat (WIA); Moshe Goldwasser (POW)	Pavel Kutakhov

Strength
2 F-4 Phantom IIs	Unknown amount of SA-3s

Casualties and losses
1 wounded 1 captured 1 aircraft destroyed 1 aircraft damaged	None

Shayar 265 (Hebrew: מבצע שיער 265, Hair 265) was the code name of an aerial operation in 1970 where Israeli F-4 Phantom IIs fell into Soviet SA-3 battery ambush stationed in Egypt during the War of Attrition. This operation exposed the tactical vulnerabilities of Israeli Air Force and undermined its aerial capabilities.

== Prelude ==
After the Six-Day War of 1967, Egypt sought to regain control over the Sinai Peninsula. However, in 1969, the war would take form in artillery duels and airstrikes and ground raids. Israeli Air Force struck deep inside Egypt in order to eliminate Egyptian equipment, infrastructure and positions. Israel's Dassault Mirage III and new F-4 Phantom jets gave it an advantage in its air raids, with Operation Priha exposing Egypt's vulnerability. Egyptian President Gamal Abdel Nasser was forced to seek Soviet assistance in Moscow. On March 1970, Soviet became directly involved in the war, deploying their SA-2 and SA-3 surface-to-air missile batteries around the Egyptian capital of Cairo and other major cities.

On 30 July, aerial battle took place between the Israeli Air Force and Soviet Air Forces, in which the Israeli jets came out victorious, leading to Soviet losses of 5 Soviet MiG-21s shot down and 3 pilots killed. This even became the basis for Soviet retaliation the following month.

== Battle ==
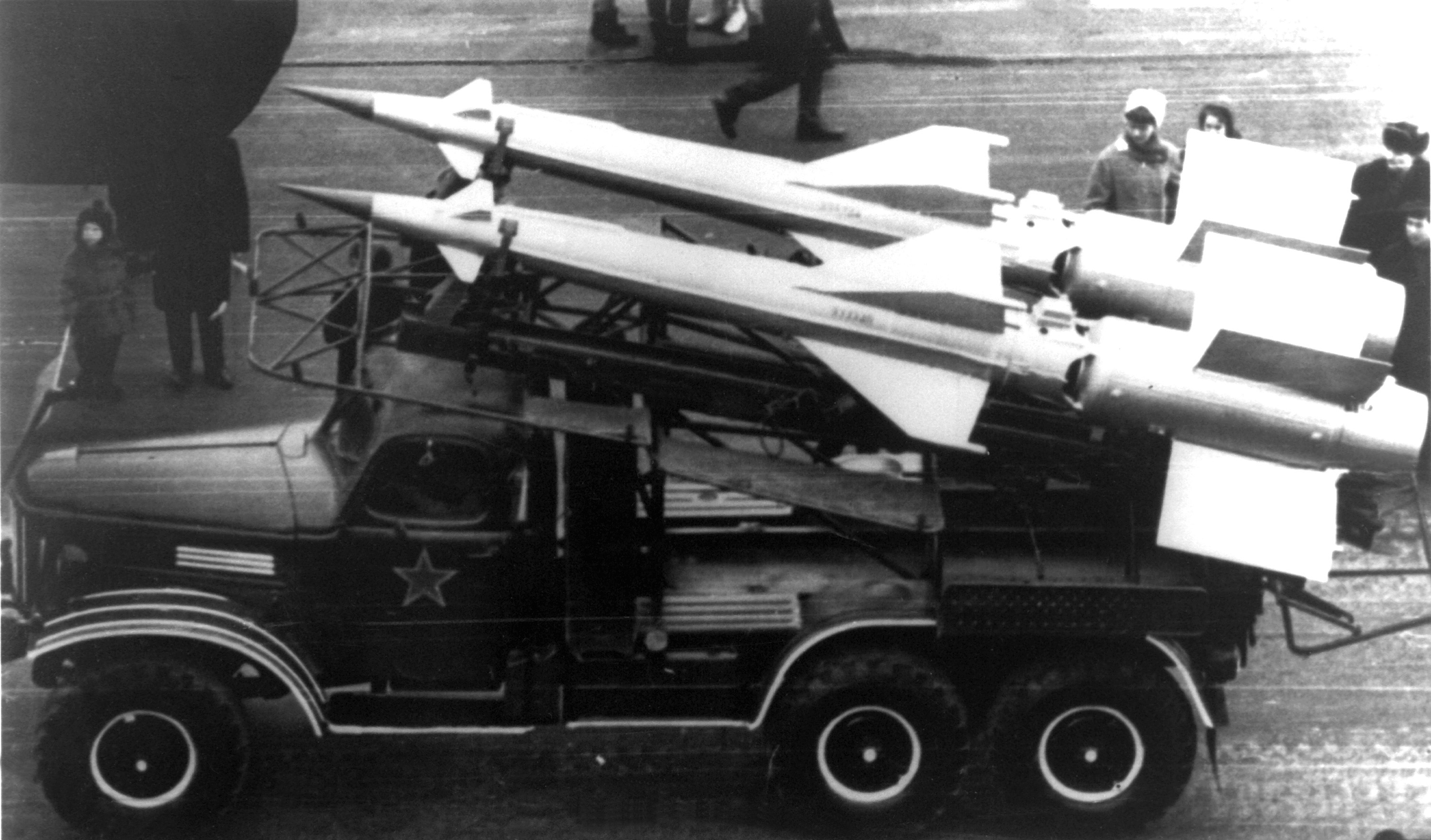
A pair of S-125 missiles on a truck.

The Soviet response was meant to be quick, Marshal Pavel Kutakhov of the Soviet Air Forces personally flew to Egypt in order to plan a retaliation against the Israeli Air Force. Moscow sent Su-15s and additional MiG-21s to Egypt.

On 3 August, the Israeli Air force was dispatched in the operation to target Egyptian attack missile batteries between Abu Suweir and Ismailia. This operation later became known as Shayar 265 or Hair 265. However, this was part of the Soviet plan to lure the Israeli jets into a counter-ambush. The targets that Israeli jets had struck were dummy batteries, while the real ones remained hidden. The Soviet SA-3s opened fire on the Israeli F-4 Phantom IIs.

== Aftermath ==
As a result of successful Soviet counter-ambush, one F-4 Phantom II was shot down and another one was damaged. Israeli pilot Yigal Shohat was severely wounded and returned to the base. Shohat's leg was later amputated. Another Israeli pilot, Moshe Goldwasser, was captured before dying in Egyptian captivity.

The operation exposed the tactical vulnerabilities of Israeli Air Force against the Soviet SA-3 batteries. The ceasefire was later signed between Israel and Egypt on 7 August. However, Egypt broke the conditions of ceasefire by moving missile batteries further east, though no major escalation took place. The Soviet forces remained in Egypt until 1972, withdrawing at the request of new Egyptian president Anwar Sadat.
