= 512th Rescue Squadron =

512th Rescue Squadron

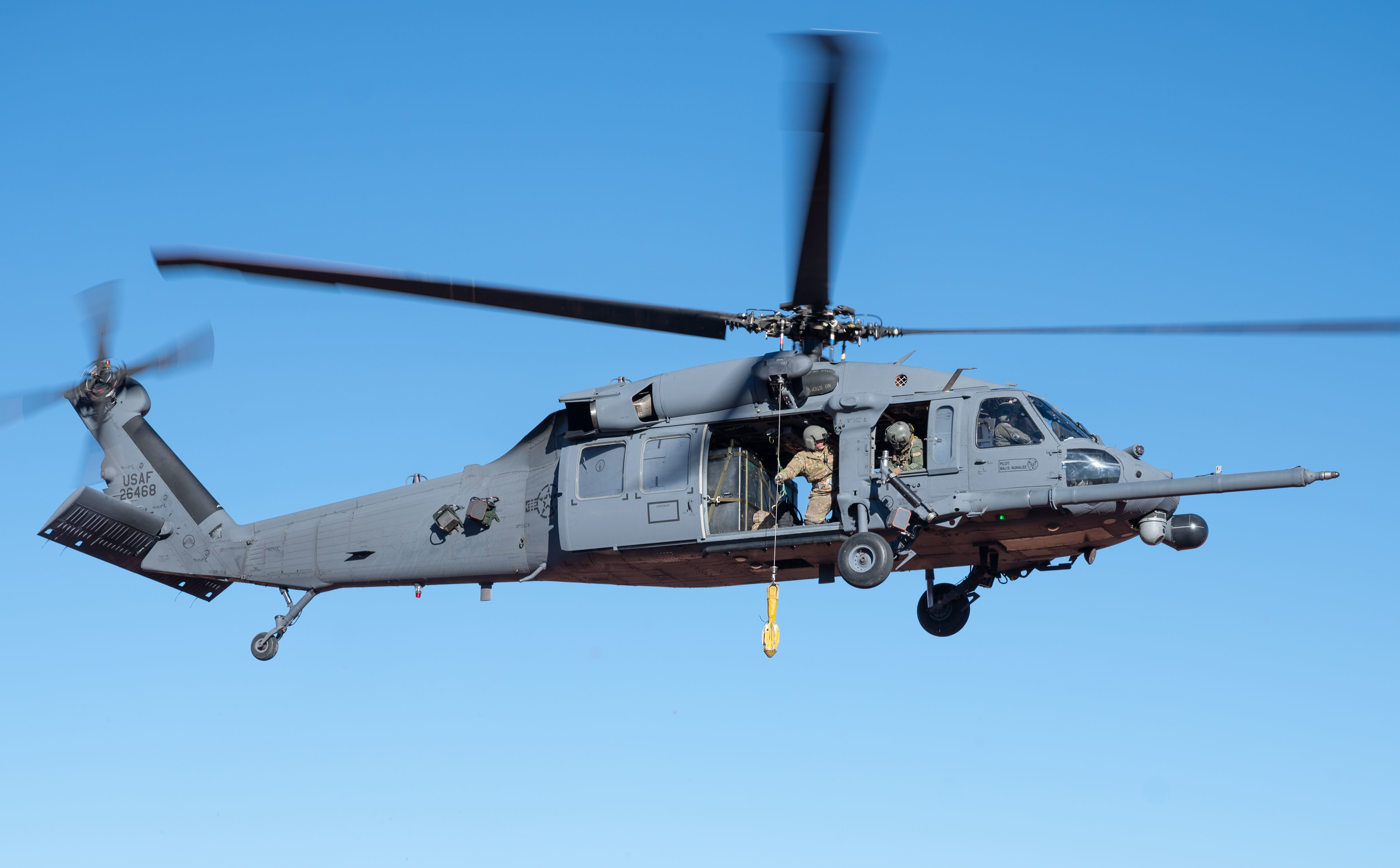
- HH-60 Pave Hawk as flown by the squadron
- Active: 1942–1946; 1947–1948; 1949–1951; 1951–1965; 1994–present
- Country: United States
- Branch: United States Air Force
- Role: Search and rescue training
- Part of: Air Education and Training Command
- Garrison/HQ: Kirtland Air Force Base
- Engagements: Mediterranean Theater of Operations; Korean War
- Decorations: Distinguished Unit Citation; Air Force Outstanding Unit Award

Insignia
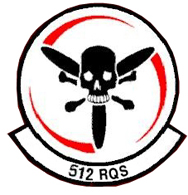
- 512th Rescue Squadron emblem (Note: Aapproved 13 April 1995.)

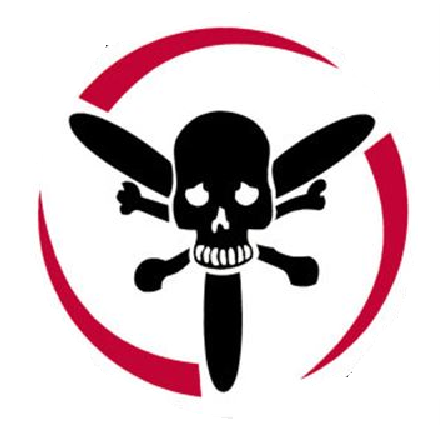
- 512th Bombardment Squadron emblem (Note: Approved 6 January 1944. Description: On a white disc, a black skull and crossbones surmounting a black three-bladed propeller, one blade to base, within border formed by red counter-clockwise stylized rotation lines from tips of propeller blades.)

The 512th Rescue Squadron is part of the 58th Special Operations Wing based at Kirtland Air Force Base, New Mexico. It formerly operated the Bell UH-1N Twin Huey, Sikorsky HH-60G Pave Hawk, and currently operates the HH-60W Jolly Green II helicopters training aircrew conducting search and rescue missions.

The squadron was formed during World War II as the 512th Bombardment Squadron in the Middle East in 1942 to reinforce the Royal Air Force in North Africa with personnel and aircraft diverted from delivery to the China Burma India Theater. The squadron moved forward, eventually being stationed in Italy, where it participated in the strategic bombing campaign against Germany, and was awarded three Distinguished Unit Citations for its combat actions. Following V-E Day, the squadron returned to the United States, where it converted to Boeing B-29 Superfortress bombers, but was inactivated in March 1946.

The squadron was redesignated the 512th Reconnaissance Squadron and activated in 1947 as a weather reconnaissance unit. Except for a brief period of inactivation in the winter of 1948–1949, it continued the reconnaissance mission until February 1951, when it was inactivated and its assets transferred to another squadron.

The squadron returned to the bombardment mission later that year, and upgraded to jet Boeing B-47 Stratojet bombers in 1954. It continued to fly the Stratojet until they were phased out of the Air Force inventory, and the squadron was inactivated in 1965.

The squadron was activated as the 512th Special Operations Squadron in April 1994 and assumed its mission of training helicopter aircrews.

== Mission ==
The squadron mission is to provide trained Bell UH-1N Twin Huey and Sikorsky HH-60G Pave Hawk crewmembers to United States Air Force helicopter units worldwide.

== History ==
=== World War II ===
==== Background ====
In early 1942, the Afrika Corps was threatening British forces in Egypt. In response, two contingents of American heavy bombers were diverted to support the British. A flight of Consolidated B-24 Liberators being ferried to India was halted from their travel in June and some Boeing B-17 Flying Fortresses from the 9th and 436th Bombardment Squadrons were flown to the Middle East from India. On 20 July 1942, these elements were organized into the 1st Provisional Group at RAF Lydda, Palestine.

==== North African operations ====
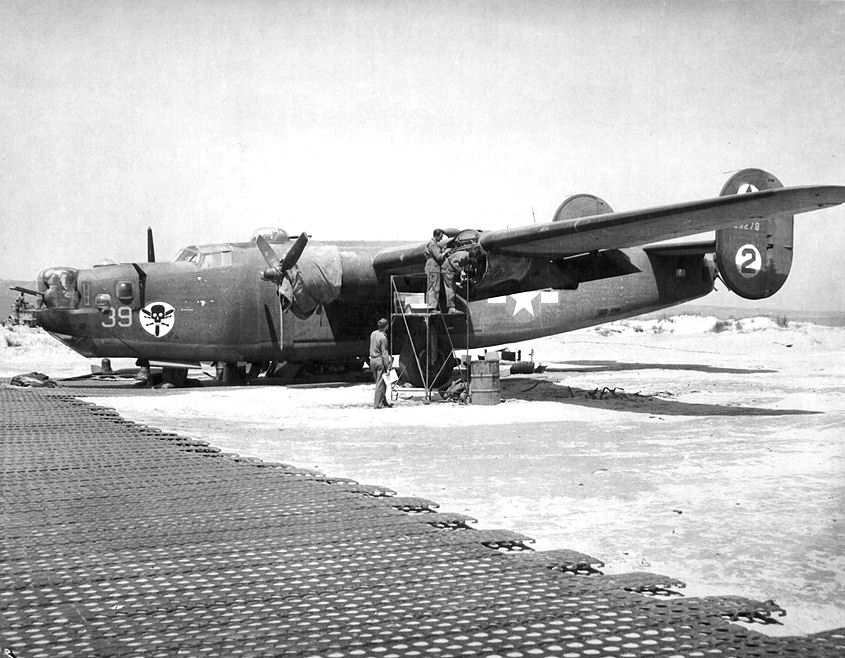
Squadron B-24 Liberator at Engidaville (Note: The aircraft displayed is Consolidated B-24J-30-CO Liberator, serial 42-73278, parked at Enfidaville Airfield, Tunisia in October 1943.)

On 31 October 1942, the 1st Group was dissolved and replaced by a formal Army Air Forces unit, the 376th Bombardment Group. The 512th Bombardment Squadron was activated as one of its four component squadrons. The squadron was originally equipped with a mix of Liberators and Flying Fortresses, but by the end of the year, the B-17s were transferred to Twelfth Air Force and the squadron became an all B-24 unit.

Moving forward to bases in Egypt and Libya, the squadron attacked shipping in the Mediterranean and harbor installations in Libya, Tunisia, Sicily, and Italy to cut enemy supply lines to North Africa. After the fall of Tunisia in May 1943, the squadron focused on attacks on airdromes, marshalling yards, and other objectives in Sicily and Italy, moving forward to Enfidaville Airfield, Tunisia in late September. Its actions during these attacks on enemy targets from its activation through August 1943 earned the squadron its first Distinguished Unit Citation (DUC).

On 1 August 1943, operating from Benina Airport, Libya, the squadron participated in Operation Tidal Wave, the low level attack on oil refineries near Ploesti, with the squadron's parent group leading the attack formation. As it approached its assigned targets, the lead aircraft realized that an order from the group commander, who had misidentified the initial point, put the group off course. The group attempted an attack on the Romana Americana refinery, its assigned objective from a different direction. By this time, enemy air defenses had been alerted and intense flak forced the unit to attack targets of opportunity. The squadron was awarded its second DUC for this operation.

==== Strategic bombing campaign ====
The squadron moved to San Pancrazio Airfield, Italy in November 1943, where it became part of Fifteenth Air Force and would remain until April 1945. Upon its move to San Pancrazio in November, it was joined by the newly-formed Royal Yugoslav Air Force Detachment, which crewed four B-24 Liberators and would remain attached to the squadron until August 1945. The squadron primarily flew long range strategic bombardment missions to targets in Italy, France, Germany, Czechoslovakia, Austria, Hungary, and the Balkans to bomb factories, marshalling yards, oil refineries, oil storage facilities, airdromes, bridges, harbors, and other objectives. On 16 June 1944, it received a third DUC for an attack on oil industry targets in Bratislava. The squadron also provided air support for Operation Shingle, the landings at Anzio, and flew interdiction missions to support the Battle of Monte Cassino between February and March 1944. In the fall of 1944, it assisted the Red Army in its advance through the Balkans, and in early 1945, supported Operation Grapeshot, the spring offensive in Northern Italy. The squadron was withdrawn from combat in April 1945 and left Italy for the United States to re-equip for a role in the Pacific.

The squadron arrived at Harvard Army Air Field, Nebraska in May 1945 and began conversion to the Boeing B-29 Superfortress. However, the war in the Pacific ended before the squadron was fully trained. After it moved to Fort Worth Army Air Field, Texas on 10 November, the squadron was not fully manned or equipped. It was inactivated on 28 March 1946, and most of its resources at Roswell Army Air Field, New Mexico were absorbed by the 509th Bombardment Group.

=== Weather reconnaissance ===
The squadron was redesignated the 512th Reconnaissance Squadron and activated at Gravelly Point, Virginia in May 1947. Although the squadron was reassigned to Air Weather Service in September, and to the 308th Reconnaissance Group in October, it was not manned before inactivating on 20 September 1948.

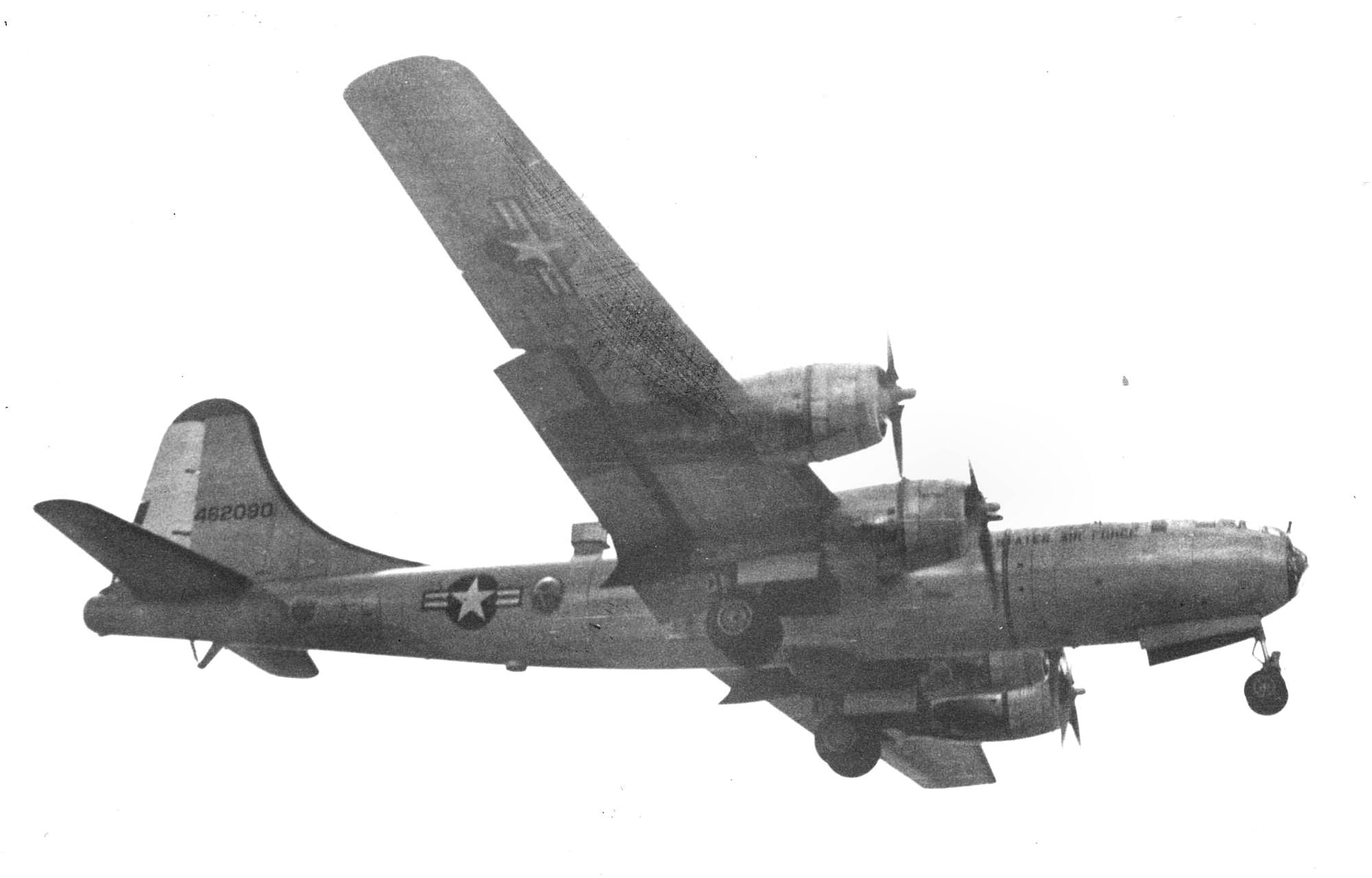
Boeing WB-29A

The squadron was reactivated at Fairfield-Suisun Air Force Base, California in February 1949. After drawing its cadre and training with the 2078th Weather Reconnaissance Squadron on various models of the Boeing B-29 Superfortress, the squadron moved to Yokota Air Base, Japan in January 1950. Air Weather Service reorganized its weather reconnaissance assets at this time, inactivating the 308th Reconnaissance Group, and reassigning its squadrons to its regional headquarters. This resulted in the assignment of the squadron to the 2143d Air Weather Wing.

The squadron was located at Yokota when the Korean War began in June. It began to perform daily weather reconnaissance missions over the combat zone. It conducted shipping surveillance and visual reconnaissance, and also performed electronic countermeasures reconnaissance. In the early days of the conflict, the squadron also dropped leaflets. Initially unarmed, and later only lightly armed with two .50-caliber machine guns in the tail turret, unit WB-29s flew daily missions over enemy-held territory.

From 27 June through 27 December 1950, the squadron flew over 200 combat missions, making over 5,000 weather observations. These missions were "exceptionally hazardous" because of varying weather conditions and exposure to attack over enemy territory. One of the squadron's WB-29s served as an aerial command post and weather station, giving on-the-spot weather data and directions to incoming bombers on the first B-29 strike against North Korean installations. On this and several later such missions, the WB-29 carried Major General Emmett O'Donnell, Jr., Commander of Far East Air Forces Bomber Command. These actions earned the squadron one of the first Air Force Outstanding Unit Awards awarded. The squadron was inactivated and replaced by the 56th Strategic Reconnaissance Squadron in February 1951.

=== Strategic Air Command ===
EB-47E Stratojet in 376th Wing markings

The squadron was redesignated the 512th Bombardment Squadron and reactivated at Forbes Air Force Base, Kansas in June 1951. The squadron was again equipped with Superfortress bombers and assigned to the 376th Group. It began training in strategic bombardment in August. However, SAC’s mobilization for the Korean War highlighted that SAC wing commanders focused too much on running the base organization and did not spend enough time on overseeing actual combat preparations. To allow wing commanders the ability to focus on combat operations, the air base group commander became responsible for managing the base housekeeping functions. Under the plan implemented in February 1951 and finalized in June 1952, the wing commander focused primarily on the combat units and the maintenance necessary to support combat aircraft by having the combat and maintenance squadrons report directly to the wing and eliminating the intermediate group structures. As a result of this "dual deputy" reorganization, the 376th Group was inactivated and the squadron was assigned directly to the 376th Bombardment Wing in June 1952.

The squadron moved to Barksdale Air Force Base, Louisiana in October. By November 1952, electronic countermeasures (ECM) training began to predominate over bombardment, and by September 1953, ECM had become the unit's primary mission. In 1954, the squadron converted to Boeing B-47 Stratojet jet medium bombers. From July to October 1955, the squadron deployed to RAF Upper Heyford, England as part of Operation Reflex, maintaining bombers on alert at the advanced station. Reflex placed Stratojets and Boeing KC-97s at bases closer to the Soviet Union for 90-day periods, although individuals rotated back to home bases during unit Reflex deployments However, after 1958, Strategic Air Command (SAC) B-47 units began to assume an alert posture at their home bases, reducing the amount of time spent on alert at overseas bases and the squadron did not deploy again as a unit. It moved again in 1957, this time to Lockbourne Air Force Base, Ohio.

During the 1962 Cuban Missile Crisis, SAC dispersed its B-47s on 22 October. Most dispersal bases were civilian airfields with Reserve or Air National Guard units. B-47s were configured for execution of the Emergency War Order as soon as possible after dispersal. On 24 October SAC went to DEFCON 2, placing all aircraft on alert. On 15 November 1/6 of the dispersed B-47s were recalled to their home bases. The remaining dispersed B-47s and supporting tankers were recalled on 24 November. On 27 November SAC returned to normal alert posture. The squadron continued to train in electronic warfare techniques until beginning to phase down for inactivation in March 1965 with the retirement of the Stratojet from SAC's inventory.

=== Helicopter training ===
The squadron was activated at Kirtland Air Force Base, New Mexico as the 512th Special Operations Squadron in April 1994, when the 58th Special Operations Wing replaced the 542d Crew Training Wing at Kirtland. The squadron retained its mission of training helicopter aircrew and participation in special operations contingencies, exercises, and humanitarian rescue helicopter training despite a change to its current name in October 2000.

== Lineage ==
- Constituted as the 512th Bombardment Squadron (Heavy) on 19 October 1942

Activated on 31 October 1942
Redesignated 512th Bombardment Squadron, Heavy on 3 May 1944
Redesignated 512th Bombardment Squadron, Very Heavy on 23 May 1945
Inactivated on 26 March 1946

- Redesignated 512th Reconnaissance Squadron, Very Long-Range, Weather on 6 May 1947

Activated on 23 May 1947
Inactivated on 20 September 1948

- Activated on 13 February 1949

Inactivated on 20 February 1951

- Redesignated 512th Bombardment Squadron, Medium on 25 May 1951

Activated on 1 June 1951
Inactivated on 15 March 1965

- Redesignated 512th Special Operations Squadron on 25 March 1994

Activated on 1 April 1994
Redesignated 512th Rescue Squadron on 6 October 2000

=== Assignments ===
- 376th Bombardment Group, 31 October 1942
- 468th Bombardment Group, 10 November 1945 – 26 March 1946
- 376th Reconnaissance Group, 23 May 1947
- Air Weather Service, 16 September 1947
- 308th Reconnaissance Group, 14 October 1947 – 20 September 1948
- 308th Reconnaissance Group, 1 February 1949
- 2143d Air Weather Wing, 14 November 1949 – 20 February 1951
- 376th Bombardment Group, 1 June 1951
- 376th Bombardment Wing, 16 June 1952 – 15 March 1965
- 58th Operations Group, 1 April 1994 – present

=== Stations ===
- RAF Lydda, Palestine, 31 October 1942
- RAF Abu Sueir, Egypt, 8 November 1942
- RAF Gambut, Libya, 10 February 1943
- Soluch Airfield, Libya, 25 February 1943
- Benina Airport, Libya, 16 April 1943
- Enfidaville Airfield, Tunisia, c. 26 September 1943 (detachment operated from Benina Airport, Libya, 3–11 Oct 1943)
- San Pancrazio Airfield, Italy, 19 November 1943 – 19 April 1945
- Harvard Army Air Field, Nebraska, 8 May 1945
- Grand Island Army Air Field, Nebraska, 25 June 1945
- Fort Worth Army Air Field, Texas, 10 November 1945 (Note: Both Maurer and Robertson refer to this station as "Tarrant Field". Robertson, Factsheet, 512th Rescue Squadron; Maurer, Combat Squadrons, p. 616. However, Mueller states that the field was renamed Fort Worth Army Air Field on 29 July 1942 and retained this name until 1948. Mueller, p. 63. Also, elsewhere Maurer gives the station of the parent 468th Group as "Fort Worth AAF." Maurer, Combat Units, p. 344.)
- Roswell Army Air Field, New Mexico, 9 January – 26 March 1946
- Gravelly Point, Virginia, 23 May 1947 – 20 September 1948
- Fairfield-Suisun Air Force Base, California, 13 February 1949 – 9 January 1950
- Yokota Air Base, Japan, 27 January 1950
- Misawa Air Base, Japan, 11 August 1950 – 20 February 1951
- Forbes Air Force Base, Kansas, 1 June 1951
- Barksdale Air Force Base, Louisiana, 10 October 1951 (deployed to RAF Upper Heyford, England 8 July – 16 October 1955)
- Lockbourne Air Force Base, Ohio, 1 December 1957 – 15 March 1965
- Kirtland Air Force Base, New Mexico, 1 April 1994 – present

=== Aircraft ===
- Boeing B-17 Flying Fortress (1942)
- Convair B-24 Liberator (1942–1945)
- Boeing B-29 Superfortress (1945, 1949–1951, 1951–1954)
- Boeing RB-29 Superfortress (1949–1951)
- Boeing WB-29 Superfortress (1949–1951)
- Douglas C-47 Skytrain (1949–1950)
- Douglas C-54 Skymaster (1950–1951)
- Boeing B-47 Stratojet (1954–1961)
- Boeing E-47 (later EB-470 Stratojet (1961–1965)
- Bell UH-1N Twin Huey (1994–present)
- Sikorsky HH-60 Pave Hawk (1994–2024)
- HH-60W Jolly Green II, (2020–present)

=== Awards and campaigns ===
Award streamer	Award	Dates	Notes
	Distinguished Unit Citation	November 1942 – 17 August 1943	North Africa and Sicily, 512th Bombardment Squadron
	Distinguished Unit Citation	1 August 1943	Ploesti, Romania, 512th Bombardment Squadron
	Distinguished Unit Citation	16 June 1944	Bratislava, Czechoslovakia, 512th Bombardment Squadron
	Air Force Outstanding Unit Award	27 June 1950 – 27 December 1950	512th Reconnaissance Squadron
	Air Force Outstanding Unit Award	1 July 1994 – 30 June 1995	512th Special Operations Squadron
	Air Force Outstanding Unit Award	1 July 1998 – 30 June 2000	512th Special Operations Squadron
	Air Force Outstanding Unit Award	1 July 2001 – 30 June 2002	512th Rescue Squadron
	Air Force Outstanding Unit Award	1 July 2002 – 30 June 2003	512th Rescue Squadron
	Air Force Outstanding Unit Award	1 July 2003 – 30 June 2004	512th Rescue Squadron
	Air Force Outstanding Unit Award	1 July 2004 – 30 June 2005	512th Rescue Squadron
	Air Force Outstanding Unit Award	1 July 2007 – 30 June 2008	512th Rescue Squadron
	Air Force Outstanding Unit Award	1 July 2009 – 30 June 2011	512th Rescue Squadron
	Air Force Outstanding Unit Award	1 July 2011 – 30 June 2013	512th Rescue Squadron
	Air Force Outstanding Unit Award	1 July 2016 – 30 June 2018	512th Rescue Squadron

Campaign Streamer	Campaign	Dates	Notes
	Air Offensive, Europe	31 October 1942 – 5 June 1944	512th Bombardment Squadron
	Air Combat, EAME Theater	31 October 1942 – 11 May 1945	512th Bombardment Squadron
	Egypt-Libya	31 October 1942 – 12 February 1943	512th Bombardment Squadron
	Tunisia	12 November 1942 – 13 May 1943	512th Bombardment Squadron
	Sicily	14 May 1943 – 17 August 1943	512th Bombardment Squadron
	Naples-Foggia	18 August 1943 – 21 January 1944	512th Bombardment Squadron
	Anzio	22 January 1944 – 24 May 1944	512th Bombardment Squadron
	Rome-Arno	22 January 1944 – 9 September 1944	512th Bombardment Squadron
	Central Europe	22 March 1944 – 18 April 1945	512th Bombardment Squadron
	Normandy	6 June 1944 – 24 July 1944	512th Bombardment Squadron
	Northern France	25 July 1944 – 14 September 1944	512th Bombardment Squadron
	Southern France	15 August 1944 – 14 September 1944	512th Bombardment Squadron
	North Apennines	10 September 1944 – 4 April 1945	512th Bombardment Squadron
	Rhineland	15 September 1944 – 21 March 1945	512th Bombardment Squadron
	Po Valley	3 April 1945 – 18 April 1945	512th Bombardment Squadron
	UN Defensive	27 June 1950 – 15 September 1950	512th Reconnaissance Squadron
	UN Offensive	16 September 1950 – 2 November 1950	512th Reconnaissance Squadron
	CCF Intervention	3 November 1950 – 24 January 1951	512th Reconnaissance Squadron
	1st UN Counteroffensive	25 January 1951 – 20 February 1951	512th Reconnaissance Squadron

== See also ==
- List of United States Air Force rescue squadrons
- List of B-47 units of the United States Air Force
- List of B-29 Superfortress operators
- List of Douglas C-47 Skytrain operators
- Boeing B-17 Flying Fortress Units of the Mediterranean Theater of Operations
- B-24 Liberator units of the United States Army Air Forces
