= Ze'ev Almog =

Israeli Navy officer

Zeev Almog
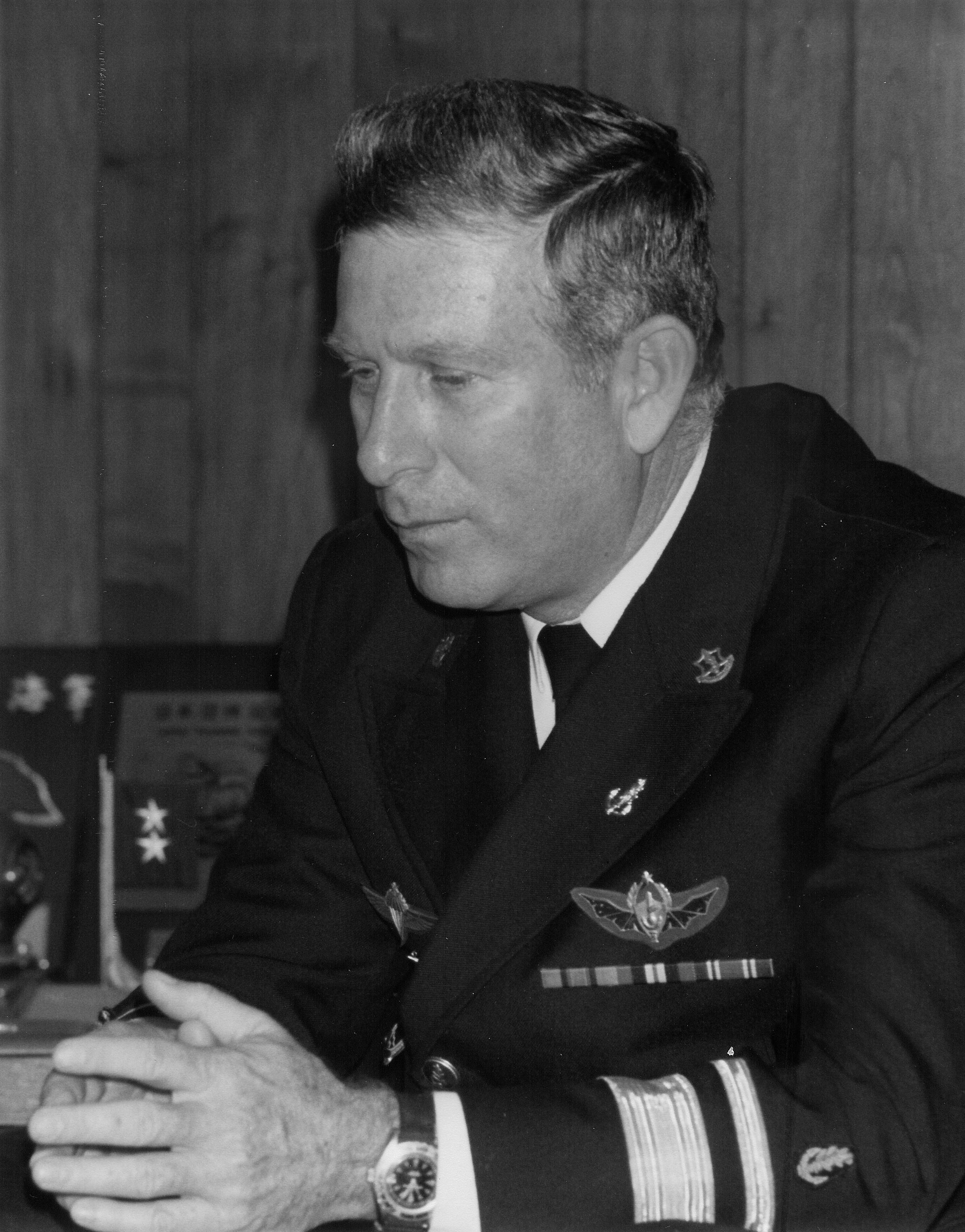
- Almog in uniform
- Native name: זאב אלמוג
- Born: 1 February 1935 (age 91); Tel Aviv, Mandatory Palestine
- Allegiance: State of Israel
- Branch: Israeli Navy
- Service years: 1952–1985
- Rank: Aluf
- Commands: INS Tanin and the INS Leviathan, Flotilla 13, Commander of the Red Sea Fleet, Commander Israeli Navy
- Conflicts: Suez Crisis; Six-Day War; War of Attrition; Yom Kippur War; 1982 Lebanon War; South Lebanon conflict
- Other work: General Manager of Israel Shipyards

Zeev Almog (Hebrew: זאב אלמוג; also written Ze'ev Almog; born 1 February 1935), was the Commander of the Israeli Navy from 1979 to 1985. He was also General Manager of Israel Shipyards from 1986 to 1995.

== Early life ==
Almog was born in Tel Aviv, Mandatory Palestine. His parents had emigrated from Poland in 1933. Almog had one younger brother, Amikam. Almog grew up and was educated in Haifa. In August 1952, he graduated from the religious High School of "Yavne" and joined the Israeli Army in the framework of Benei Akiva (a religious youth organization), the "Nahal". Almog graduated from Class Commanders and Physical Education Instructors courses and served in the infantry brigade of the Nahal.

== Naval service ==
In May 1954, Almog volunteered for the Naval Commando Unit and in 1955 was certified as a Naval Commando Warrior. He was then sent to Officers and Naval Cadets Schools. In July 1957, Almog was qualified as a naval officer. In November of the same year, he was appointed as a Squad Commander within the Naval Commando Unit, and for the next five years filled active command and training roles within the Naval Commando Unit.

From 1962 to 1965, Almog studied at the Hebrew University in Jerusalem. He received a BA degree in Geography and Political Science. He conducted research and delivered his final dissertation on "The Geomorphology of the Coast of Atlit".

In October 1965, he was appointed Chief of Operations of the Naval Commando Unit. In December 1966 he was certified and given command of a Naval Torpedo Boat. During the Six-Day War in 1967, he was called to command a Naval Commando Team that penetrated the Egyptian port of Port Said.

=== Commander of the Naval Commando Unit ("Flotilla 13") ===
In May 1968, Almog was appointed as the commander of the Naval Commando Unit. During his tenure the status and functioning of the unit were dramatically transformed. Under Almog's leadership, the unit performed eighty combat operations, the majority during the War of Attrition. Among the more noteworthy operations were the raids on the Adabiya coast post, the Green Island fort (Operation Bulmus 6), as well as the sinking of two Egyptian torpedo boats in the Gulf of Suez (operation Escort), whose successful completion was the precondition for the execution of the armored raid (operation Raviv) on the Egyptian shore. Almog completed professional training courses in different naval units and was certified as a missile boat commander.

=== Commander of the Red Sea Arena ===
In July 1972, Almog was appointed as the Commander of the Red Sea Arena at the rank of captain. He commanded the combat operations of this arena during the Yom Kippur War (1973) which resulted in the incapacitation of the Egyptian navy in the Gulf of Suez along with the destruction and capture of 28 Egyptian vessels.

During the Yom Kippur War, Almog joined the fourth raid into the Egyptian port of Hurgada, in the northern part of the Red Sea. During this raid an Egyptian Missile boat was sunk using anti-tank M72 LAW missiles.

In addition, Almog participated in mortar shelling launched from a landing craft on the Egyptian anchorage of Marsa T'lamat (Central Gulf of Suez).

Under Almog's command, the new Naval base at Sharm el-Sheikh was built. This base absorbed the first two Israeli-made Sa'ar 4 class missile boats that reached the base after sailing around Africa (due to the blockage of the Suez Canal).

In 1974, Almog studied at the US Naval War College in Newport, Rhode Island and received a Master's degree in Management and Strategy.

In August 1975 he was appointed as the commander of the Naval Base of Haifa and was promoted to one-star Rear Admiral. In November 1976 he was appointed as a member of the founding team of the Israeli National Defense College and served as an instructor in the college during its first year of operation.

=== Commander of the Israeli Navy ===
In January 1979, following the dismissal of Michael Barkai due to sexual misconduct, Almog was appointed as the Commander In Chief (C.I.C.) of the Israeli Navy and was promoted to the rank of two star Rear Admiral. He served in this position until February 1985 (longer than any other Commander In Chief of the Israeli Navy). Following are some of the noteworthy milestones from this period in his career:

Restructuring of the navy's organizational structure

Israel's naval territory was organized and divided into three naval arenas: Haifa, Ashdod, and the Red Sea. The commanders of these arenas were assigned with full responsibility for the territory and forces under their command and their authority was expanded.

Improvement in Israel's seashore security

After a decade of lethal terrorist penetrations into Israel, under Almog's command, was able to eliminate penetration of terrorists from the Mediterranean and Red seas. This was achieved as a result of an execution of new plan that combined both defensive and offensive actions.

During this period, the navy had conducted hundreds of combat intrusions into terrorist bases. In 1982, it participated in the First Lebanon War during which ground forces and thousands of armored vehicles were landed on the Lebanese seashore. The navy had also assisted ground forces by firing at the enemy forces from missile boats off the shores of Lebanon. All Naval operations were conducted without any loss of Israeli lives or damage to naval vessels.

Peace treaty with Egypt

Israel naval bases in the Sinai Peninsula were evacuated. Israel resumed routine sailing of vessels in the Suez Canal. Visits of naval vessels and personnel between the Egyptian and the Israeli navy were conducted. Search operations for the missing submarine "Dakar" were resumed.

Update of naval strategy

A new strategy called "Inter-operational Naval Battle" was developed. Its core element included combined operation of missile boats, submarines and naval commandos. The new strategy was ratified by the military Chief of Staff.

Design of future combat equipment

The Israeli Navy conducted extensive planning in order to define its future needs, and the development and acquisition of equipment. This included Sa'ar 5 missile boats ("Lahav"), Dolphine submarines, anti-missile missiles ("Barak") and naval helicopters ("Dolphin" type). In addition, the Navy launched the development and the build-up of a sophisticated system of alert and surveillance along the shores of Israel.

The Absorption of new vessels and systems

Missile boats Sa'ar 4 type ("Nadran"), missile boats Sa'ar 4.5 type ("Noshav"), hydrofoil missile boats ("Zivanit"), anti-missile cannons ("Vulcan Phalanx"), Encapsulated Harpoon missiles launched from "Gal" submarines, new boats for the naval commandos, and new electronic and other systems for most naval boats.

Training re-organization

Training methods for officers and sailors were formulated. A new procedure by which vessel commanders are certified was defined. Career paths for officers ranking from Ensign to Commander were constructed and included academic studies.

Bringing of Ethiopian Jews to Israel

In the period preceding the Operation Moses, the first 1,000 Ethiopian Jews were brought from the shores of Sudan to Israel, under a covert operation.

== General Manager – Israel Shipyards ==
In March 1986, Almog retired from the IDF and was appointed, at the request of the Ministers of Transportation and Finance and the Official Receiver of the state as a "Special Manager" for the government-owned Israel Shipyards. This appointment stemmed from the serious situation of the shipyards that were on a verge of bankruptcy and needed a turnaround. Nine years later, after completion of a turnaround program the company became profitable, was taken out of receivership and was sold as a viable business to private investors.

During Almog's tenure as the General Manager of the shipyards it developed two types of sophisticated vessels: Sa'ar 4.5 missile boat ("Nirit" type) and the fast patrol boat ("Shaldag") that was purchased by the Israeli Navy and other foreign navies. During this time the American Navy's Sixth Fleet conducted 50% of its Mediterranean ship repairs in Israel Shipyards. It has invested significant funding in dredging the shipyard harbor and improving other infrastructure facilities at the shipyards.

In April 1995, after the privatization of the shipyards, Almog resigned from the shipyards management and devoted his time to serving on various organizations and companies' board of directors such as Israel-Africa Investment Company and was elected to the Israeli Management Society. he was elected as a member of the Board of Trustees of the University of Haifa and as a member of the steering committee of the Institutes for Oceanic Studies at Haifa University. He served as the chairman of the Israeli national fund for the development of scuba diving.

== Special awards ==
Almog received the Legion of Merit award from the United States Secretary of Defense while commanding the Israeli Navy (1981).

Almog was selected by the World Board of Governors of the U.S.O (a US government organization responsible for personal wellbeing of the US military around the world) to become the first U.S.O president in Israel (1992).

He published several articles in Israeli and foreign publications on topics of military operations and management and had lectured at military academies and research centers in Israel and abroad about naval operations and technology. He published a book called "Bats in the Red Sea – special operations of naval commandos in the War of Attrition and the Yom Kippur War" (Ministry of Defense Publications and Galilee Research Center for the Defense Force, 2007).

== Family ==
Ze'ev Almog is married to Dr. Geula Almog, a children's literature expert. The couple has three children: Gal, Oz, and Ram. His brother Amikam married Ita Almog and together they had two children: Tal and Daniel. Tal married Emily Almog and they had three daughters: Abigail, Naomi, and Elizabeth.

== Reference books ==
- Rear Adm. Ze'ev Almog, Flotilla 13: Israeli Naval Commandos in the Red Sea, 1967–1973, Naval Institute Press (15 November 2010).
- Samuel M. Katz, The Night Raiders, Pocket, 1997.
