= Operation Boxer =

1969 Israeli aerial offensive at Suez Canal

- Part of the War of Attrition
Date	July 20–28, 1969
Location	Suez Canal
Result	Tactical Israeli success

Belligerents
Israel	Egypt

Commanders and leaders
Haim Bar-Lev; Mordechai Hod	Ahmad Ismail Ali

Casualties and losses
2 aircraft	300 killed 8 aircraft

Operation Boxer was an aerial offensive undertaken by the Israeli Air Force along the Suez Canal in July 1969. The first major IAF operation since the 1967 Six-Day War, the operation signaled a new phase in the War of Attrition.

== Background ==
Despite Israel's decisive victory in the 1967 Six-Day War, there were no diplomatic efforts in subsequent years to resolve the issues at the heart of the Arab-Israeli conflict. In September 1967 Arab states formulated the "Three Nos" policy, barring peace, recognition or negotiations with Israel, and believing that "what was taken by force, will not be restored except by force", President Nasser of Egypt soon resumed hostilities along the Suez Canal. These initially took the form of limited artillery duels and small scale incursions into the Sinai, but by 1969 the Egyptian Army was prepared for larger scaled operations. On March 8 Nasser proclaimed the official launch of the War of Attrition, characterized by large scale shelling along the Canal, accompanied by pin-point sniping and commando assaults. Fighting intensified as summer approached.

The Egyptian Army, superior in both manpower and artillery to the Israel Defense Forces, was better able to sustain a lengthy and costly static war. Israel, therefore, sought a demonstration of its aerial superiority to deter Egypt from a continuation of the war, and in early July 1969 the Israeli Air Force was instructed to prepare a large scale assault on Egyptian positions on the western bank of the canal. The resulting plan, codenamed operation "Boxer 1" envisioned a gradual attack beginning at the northern tip of the Canal, where defences were relatively weak, and rolling southwards.

Before operations against the Egyptian positions could begin, the IDF sought to disable the early warning radar and ELINT facilities on Green Island, a heavily fortified island located near the southern extremity of the Canal. Deemed a possible threat to Israeli aircraft operating in the region, the island was attacked by Israeli special forces on July 19 as part of Operation Bulmus 6, destroying its anti-aircraft defences and early-warning radar. Israeli Air Force 115 Squadron A-4 Skyhawks struck the island before the attack commenced, while a pair of 124 Squadron Bell 205s participated in the extraction of Israeli troops after their departure.

== Battle ==
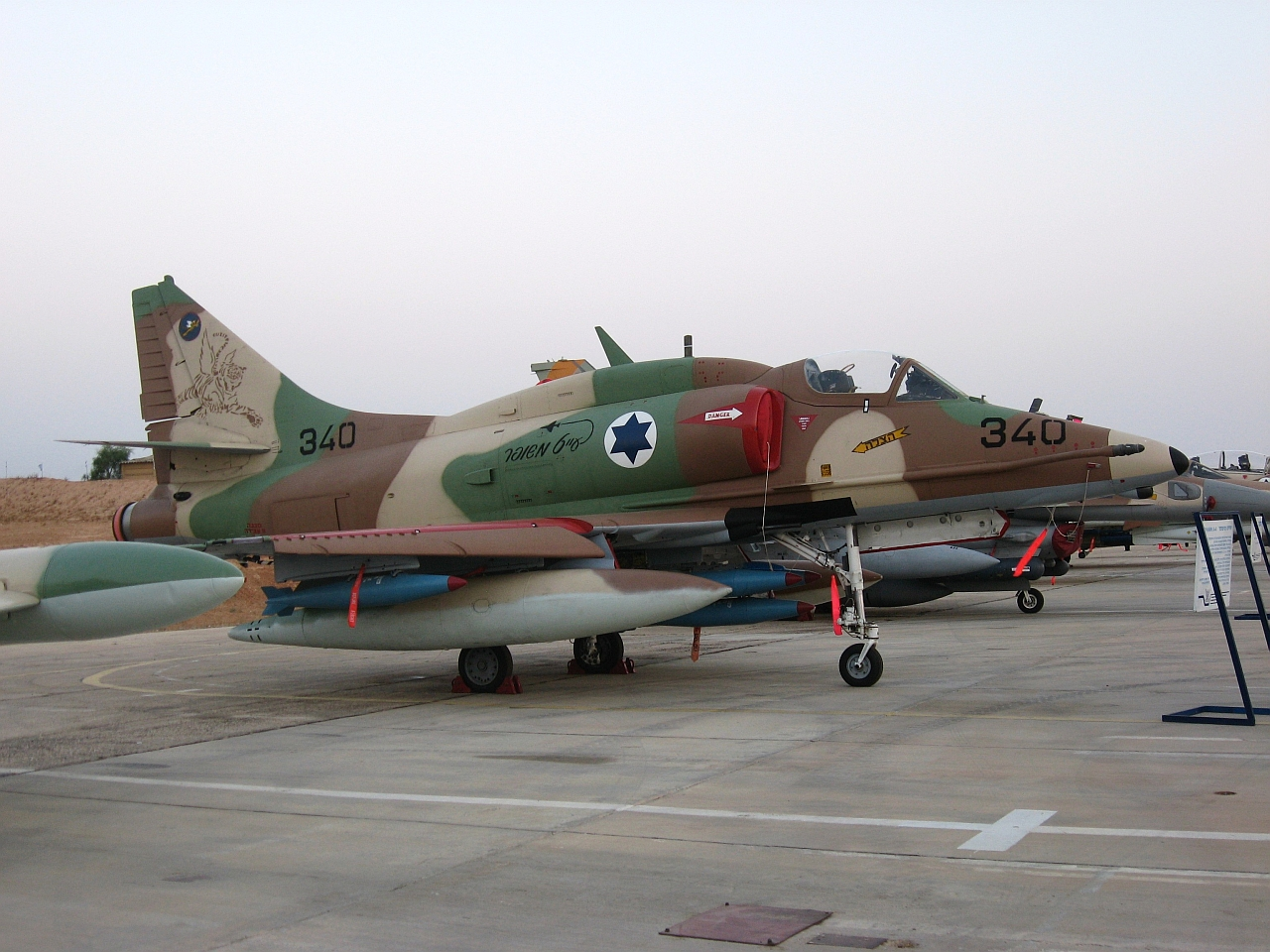
Israeli Air Force 102 Squadron A-4N Skyhawk

=== Boxer 1 ===
"Boxer 1" commenced at 14:00 pm on Sunday, July 20, 1969, with a strike by a pair of 117 Squadron Mirages against an SA-2 battery west of Port Said. Once the two had disabled the battery's "Fan Song" acquisition radar, the rest of its installations were then destroyed by 109 Squadron Skyhawks. With Egyptian air defences thus weakened, Israeli Air Force squadrons proceeded to attack Egyptian positions throughout the sector. Attacking aircraft included additional Skyhawks from 109, 102 and 115 Squadrons, Dassault Super Mysteres from 105 Squadron, Dassault Mysteres from 116 Squadron, 113 Squadron Dassault Ouragans and 110 Squadron Sud-Ouest Vautours. By 17:00 pm, the IAF had undertaken 171 sorties and dropped some 200 tons of explosives.

Having caught Egypt by surprise, Israeli strikes went unchallenged by the Egyptian Air Force. As these were winding down, however, the EAF launched its own assault on Israeli strongholds along the eastern bank of the Canal. Sixty Egyptian aircraft took part in these strikes, carried out by MiG-17 and Su-7 strike aircraft escorted by MiG-21 fighters. Six 101 Squadron Mirages were therefore scrambled from Rephidim and another pair from Hazor. In the ensuing battles Giora Yoeli and Giora Epstein managed to down a MiG-17 each, while Yiftah Spector also shot down a MiG-21, although at the cost of two Mirages, with Eitan Ben-Eliyahu and Eli Zohar bailing out of their stricken aircraft. Another MiG-17 fell prey to a MIM-23 Hawk battery and a Su-7 to anti-aircraft artillery.

=== Boxer 2 ===
Satisfied with the results of "Boxer 1", the IAF decided to proceed with additional strikes. July 21 saw four 109 Squadron Skyhawks attack an Egyptian anti-aircraft battery near Qantarah in preparation for the next day of battle. "Boxer 2" took place on July 24 and was aimed at Egyptian positions along the central section of the canal. The day's fighting began with the destruction of a radar station at Gebel Ataka by two 119 Squadron Mirages. Subsequent strikes were directed primarily at Egyptian SAM sites and anti-aircraft artillery, with IAF strike aircraft carrying out 161 sorties throughout the day. These were in turn followed by an Egyptian assault against Israeli positions along the canal and Sinai coast. Israeli Mirages were once again directed towards the attacking aircraft and managed to down three: a Su-7 shared by Shmuel Gordon and Michael Zuk, another Su-7 shot down by Ran Goren, and a MiG-21 brought down by a Shafrir 2 missile fired by Shlomo Nevot. Two additional MiG-17s were claimed by a Hawk battery, and another Su-7 by a Bofors 40 mm cannon.

=== Subsequent Boxers ===
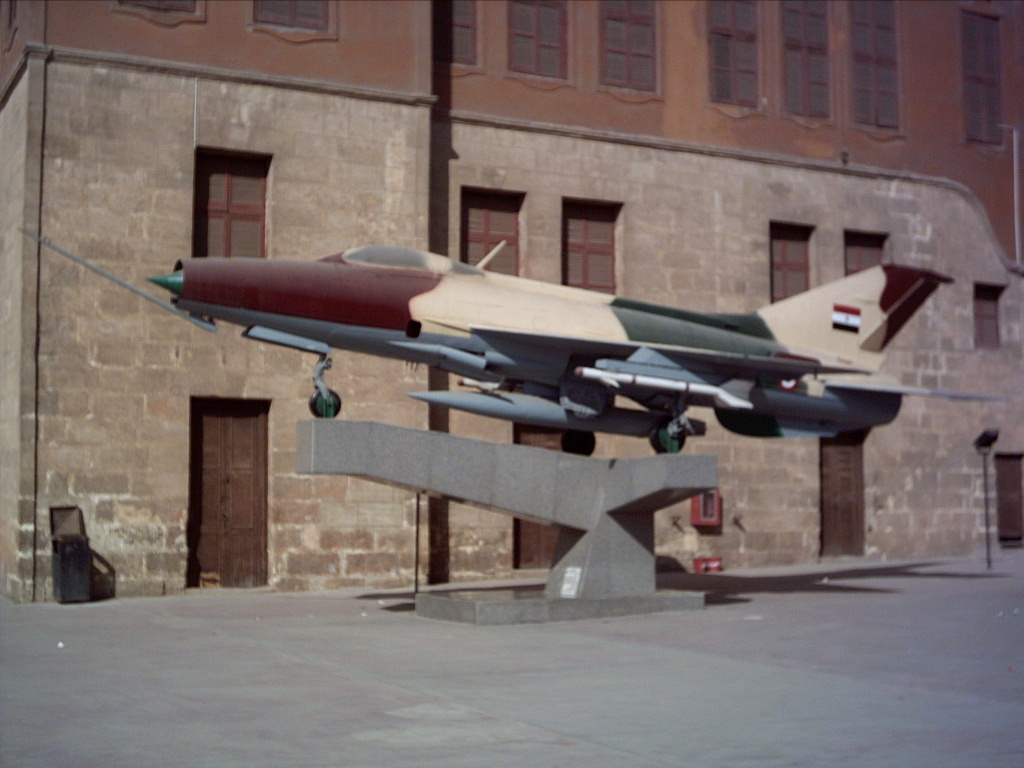
Egyptian Air Force MiG-21F at the Egyptian National Military Museum

"Boxer 3" took place on the next day, July 25, with IAF aircraft once again pounding Egyptian positions. A friendly-fire incident on that day saw a 101 Squadron Mirage damage a 119 Squadron jet, although the aircraft made it safely back to base. Strikes continued on July 26 with "Boxer 4" and July 27 with "Boxer 5", during which several 109 Squadron Skyhawks carried out a nighttime attack. The last operation of the series, "Boxer 6", took place on July 28, 1969, during which Israeli Mirages once again battled Egyptian MiG-21s, though no aircraft were lost on either side.

== Aftermath ==
The Israeli Air Force flew some 500 sorties during Operation Boxer, mauling Egyptian air defences and inflicting considerable damage on Egyptian fortifications and artillery along the Suez Canal. Egyptian losses were estimated at approximately 300 soldiers. Tactically successful, the Boxer offensive temporarily scaled down the fighting along the canal. In the long run, however, the Egyptian Army recovered from the losses it had suffered and fighting resumed with even greater intensity. Operation Boxer failed to deter Egypt from carrying on the War of Attrition. Having already lost face to Israeli air power during the 1967 war, the fighting of July 1969 was unlikely to cause a reversal of Egyptian intentions, and instead only served to escalate existing tensions along the frontier. This in turn would lead the IAF to become the IDF's "flying artillery", bridging the quantitative gap between Egyptian and Israeli forces, a role the IAF had previously been reluctant to play and one which would draw it even further into the fighting.
