= War of Attrition =

1967–1970 war between Israel and Egypt

- Part of the Arab–Israeli conflict and the Cold War
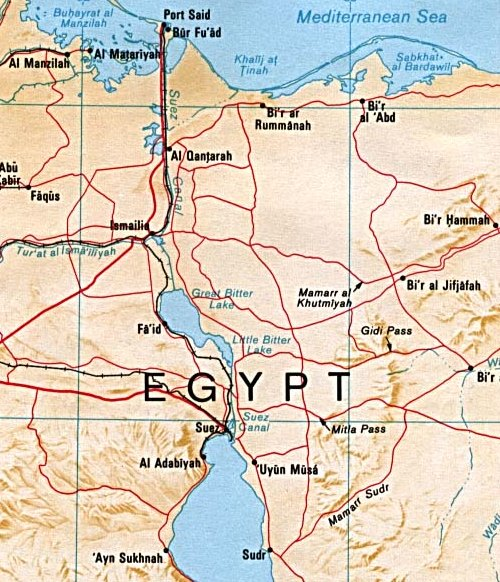
- The Israeli–Egyptian war of Attrition was centered largely on the Suez Canal.
Date	July 1, 1967 – August 7, 1970 (ceasefire) (3 years, 1 month and 6 days)
Location	Sinai Peninsula (Israeli controlled)
Result	See § Aftermath

Belligerents
Israel	Egypt; Soviet Union; Kuwait; PLO; Jordan; Syria; Cuba

Commanders and leaders
(Israel) Levi Eshkol; (Israel) Yigal Allon; (Israel) Haim Bar-Lev; (Israel) Ariel Sharon; (Israel) Uzi Narkiss; (Israel) Mordechai Hod; (Israel) Shlomo Erell; (Israel) Avraham Botzer	(United Arab Republic) Gamal Abdel Nasser; (United Arab Republic) Ahmad Ismail Ali; (United Arab Republic) Anwar El Sadat; (United Arab Republic) Saad El Shazly; (United Arab Republic) Abdul Munim Riad †; (United Arab Republic) Ali Baghdady; (United Arab Republic) Fouad Abou Zikry; (United Arab Republic) Mahmoud Fahmy; (Soviet Union) Andrei Grechko; (Jordan) Hussein bin Talal; (Jordan) Zaid ibn Shaker; (Jordan) Amer Khammash; (Palestine Liberation Organization) Yasser Arafat; (Palestine Liberation Organization) Abu Iyad

Strength
275,000 (including reserves)	Egyptian: 200,000; Soviet: 10,700–15,000; Jordanian: 15,000; PLO: 900–1,000

Casualties and losses
694–1,424 soldiers killed; 227 civilians killed; 2,659 wounded, from this 999 at the Egyptian front; 24–30 aircraft	Egypt: 2,882–10,000 soldiers and civilians killed; 6,285 wounded; 60–114 aircraft lost; PLO: 1,828 killed; 2,500 captured; Jordan: 300 killed; 4 captured; 30 tanks; Kuwait: 25 killed; Soviet Union: 58+ dead; 5 aircraft; Cuba: 180 dead; 250 wounded; Syria: 500 killed

Suez Canal, 1970

The War of Attrition (Arabic: حرب الاستنزاف, romanized: Ḥarb al-Istinzāf; Hebrew: מלחמת ההתשה, romanized: Milḥemet haHatashah) involved fighting between Israel and Egypt, Jordan, the Palestine Liberation Organization (PLO) and their allies from 1967 to 1970.

Following the 1967 Six-Day War, no serious diplomatic efforts were made to resolve the issues at the heart of the Arab–Israeli conflict. The 1967 Arab League summit formulated in September the "three no's" policy, barring peace, recognition, or negotiations with Israel. Egyptian President Gamal Abdel Nasser believed that only military initiative would compel Israel or the international community to facilitate a full Israeli withdrawal from Sinai, and hostilities soon resumed along the Suez Canal.

These initially took the form of limited artillery duels and small-scale incursions into Sinai, but by 1969, the Egyptian Army judged itself prepared for larger-scale operations. On March 8, 1969, Nasser proclaimed the official launch of the War of Attrition, characterized by large-scale shelling along the Suez Canal, extensive aerial warfare and commando raids. Hostilities continued until August 1970 and ended with a ceasefire. The frontiers remained the same as when the war began, with no real commitment to serious peace negotiations.

== Egyptian front ==
Israel's victory in the Six-Day War left the entirety of the Egyptian Sinai Peninsula up to the eastern bank of the Suez Canal under Israeli control. Egypt was determined to regain the Sinai, and also sought to mitigate the severity of its defeat. Sporadic clashes were taking place along the cease-fire line, and Egyptian missile boats sank the Israeli destroyer INS Eilat on October 21, 1967.

Egypt began shelling Israeli positions along the Bar Lev Line, using heavy artillery, MiG aircraft and various other forms of Soviet assistance with the hope of forcing the Israeli government into concessions. Israel responded with aerial bombardments, airborne raids on Egyptian military positions, and aerial strikes against strategic facilities in Egypt. The strategic bombing of Egypt had mixed military and political results.

The international community and both countries attempted to find a diplomatic solution to the conflict. The Jarring Mission of the United Nations was supposed to ensure that the terms of UN Security Council Resolution 242 would be observed, but by late 1970, it was clear that this mission had been a failure. Fearing the escalation of the conflict into an "East vs. West" confrontation during the tensions of the mid-Cold War, the American president, Richard Nixon, sent his Secretary of State, William Rogers, to formulate the Rogers Plan in view of obtaining a ceasefire.

In August 1970, Israel, Jordan, and Egypt agreed to an "in place" ceasefire under the terms proposed by the Rogers Plan. The plan contained restrictions on missile deployment by both sides, and required the cessation of raids as a precondition for peace. The Egyptians and their Soviet allies rekindled the conflict by violating the agreement shortly thereafter, moving their missiles near to the Suez Canal, and constructing the largest anti-aircraft system yet implemented at that point in history. The Israelis responded with a policy which their Prime Minister, Golda Meir, dubbed "asymmetrical response", wherein Israeli retaliation was disproportionately large in comparison to any Egyptian attacks.

Following Nasser's death in September 1970, his successor, Anwar Al-Sadat, continued the ceasefire with Israel, focusing on rebuilding the Egyptian army and planning a full-scale attack on the Israeli forces controlling the eastern bank of the Suez Canal. These plans would materialize three years later in the Yom Kippur War. Ultimately, Israel would return Sinai to Egypt after the two nations signed a peace treaty in 1979.

The Egyptian Air Force and Air Defense Forces performed poorly. Egyptian pilots were rigid, slow to react and unwilling to improvise. According to U.S. intelligence estimates, Egypt lost 109 aircraft, most in air-to-air combat, while only 16 Israeli aircraft were lost, most to anti-aircraft artillery or SAMs. It took a salvo of 6 to 10 SA-2 Egyptian anti-aircraft missiles to obtain a better than fifty percent chance of a hit. Kenneth Pollack notes that Egypt's commandos performed "adequately" though they rarely ventured into risky operations on a par with the daring of Israel's commandos, Egypt's artillery corps encountered difficulty in penetrating the Bar-Lev forts and eventually adopted a policy of trying to catch Israeli troops in the exterior parts of the forts.

== Timeline ==
=== 1967 ===
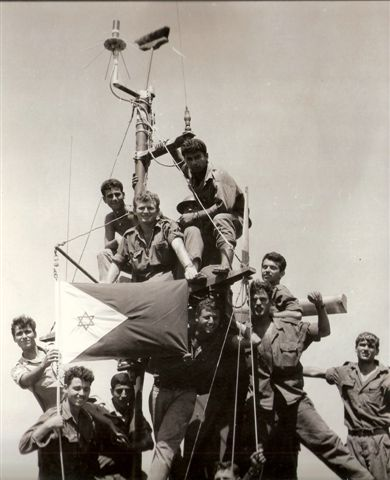
Israeli naval personnel celebrate their victory after an engagement with Egyptian naval forces near Rumani, 1967

- July 1, 1967: An Egyptian commando force from Port Fuad moves south and takes up a position at Ras el 'Ish, located 10 miles south of Port Said on the eastern bank of the Suez Canal, an area controlled by the Israelis since the ceasefire on June 9, 1967. An Israeli armored infantry company attacks the Egyptian force. The Israeli company drives off the Egyptians but loses 1 dead and 13 wounded. However, another source claims that an Israeli attack on Port Fuad was repulsed. According to Zeev Maoz, the battle was decided in favor of the Egyptians.
- July 2, 1967: The Israeli Air Force bombs Egyptian artillery positions that had supported the commandos at Ras Al-'Ish.
- July 4, 1967: Egyptian Air Force jets strike several Israeli targets in Sinai. An Egyptian MiG-17 is shot down.
- July 8, 1967: An Egyptian Air Force MiG-21 is shot down by Israeli air defenses while on a reconnaissance mission over el-Qanatra. Two Su-7s equipped with cameras are then sent out to carry out the mission, and manage to complete several turns over Sinai without any opposition. Two other Su-7s are sent for another reconnaissance mission hours later, but are attacked by Israeli Air Force fighter jets. One Su-7 is shot down.
- July 11–12, 1967: Battle of Rumani Coast – The Israeli Navy destroyer INS Eilat and two torpedo boats sink two Egyptian torpedo boats off the Rumani coast. No crewmen on the Egyptian torpedo boats are known to have survived, and there were no Israeli casualties.
- July 14, 1967: Artillery exchanges and aerial duels erupt near the Suez Canal. Seven Egyptian fighter aircraft are shot down.
- July 15, 1967: An Israeli Air Force Mirage III is shot down by an Egyptian MiG-21.
- October 21, 1967: Two missile boats from the Egyptian Navy sink the Israeli destroyer INS Eilat with anti-ship missiles, killing 47 sailors.
- October, 1967: In retaliation to the sinking of the Eilat, Israeli artillery bombards oil refineries and depots near Suez. In a series of artillery exchanges throughout October, the Egyptians sustain civilian casualties. Egypt evacuates a large number of civilians in the canal region.

=== 1968 ===
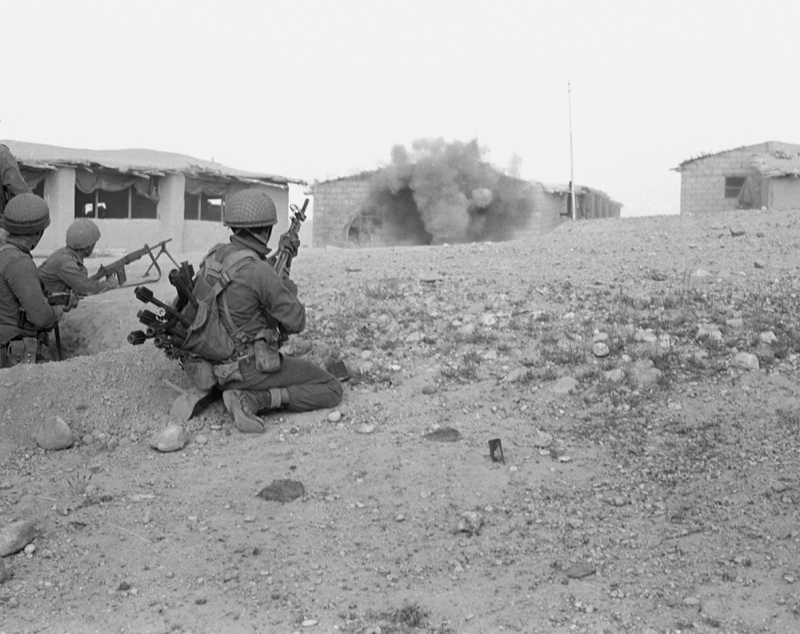
Israeli paratroopers in action during the Battle of Karameh in 1968

- January 31, 1968: Five Israeli soldiers were wounded and one Israeli and two Egyptian tanks were destroyed in a clash in the canal zone. Israeli and Jordanian forces also exchanged fire without known casualties.
- March 21, 1968: In response to persistent PLO raids against Israeli civilian targets, Israel attacks the town of Karameh, Jordan, the site of a major PLO camp. The goal of the invasion was to destroy Karameh camp and capture Yasser Arafat in reprisal for the attacks by the PLO against Israeli civilians, which culminated in an Israeli school bus hitting a mine in the Negev. However, plans for the two operations were prepared in 1967, one year before the bus incident. When Jordan saw the size of the raiding forces entering the battle it was led to the assumption that Israel had another goal of capturing Balqa Governorate to create a situation similar to the Golan Heights. Israel assumed that the Jordanian Army would ignore the invasion, but the latter fought alongside the Palestinians and opened heavy fire that inflicted losses upon the Israeli forces. This engagement marked the first known deployment of suicide bombers by Palestinian forces. The Israelis were repelled at the end of a day's battle, having destroyed most of the Karameh camp and taken around 141 PLO prisoners. Both sides declared victory. On a tactical level, the battle went in Israel's favor, and the destruction of the Karameh camp was achieved. However, the relatively high casualties were a considerable surprise for the IDF and was stunning to the Israelis. Although the Palestinians were not victorious on their own, King Hussein let the Palestinians take credit.

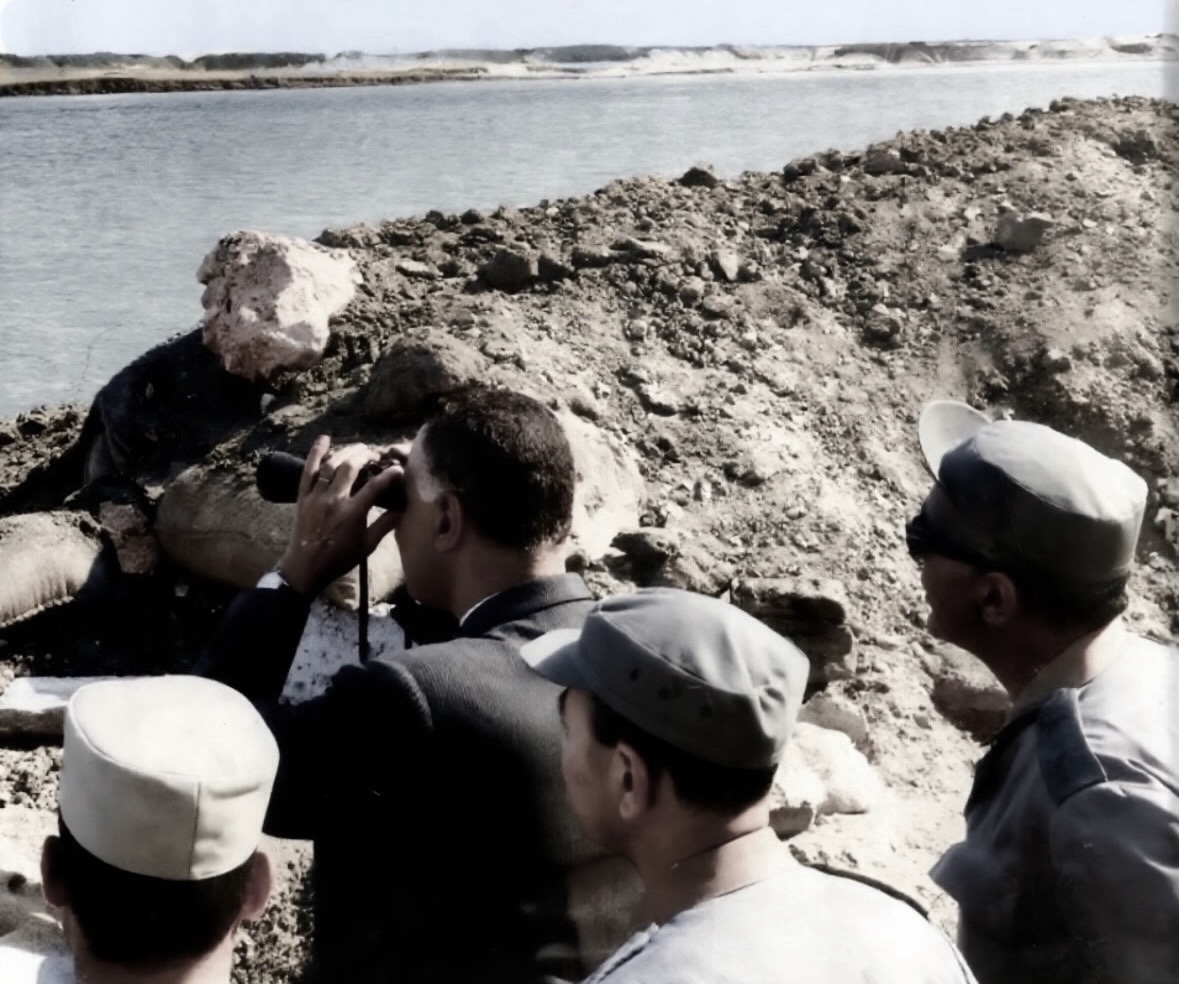
President Nasser of Egypt (with binoculars) surveys positions at the Suez Canal in November 1968

- June 1968: The war "officially" begins, with sparse Egyptian artillery bombardment of the Israeli front line on the east bank of the Suez Canal. More artillery bombardments in the following months cause Israeli casualties.
- August 20, 1968: Israeli and Jordanian forces engaged in a battle along the Sea of Galilee involving artillery, mortars, and machine guns.
- September 8, 1968: An Egyptian artillery barrage kills 10 Israeli soldiers and injures 18. Israel responds by shelling Suez and Ismailia.
- October 30, 1968: Israeli helicopter-borne Sayeret Matkal commandos carry out Operation Shock, destroying an Egyptian electric transformator station, two dams along the Nile River and a bridge. The blackout causes Nasser to cease hostilities for a few months while fortifications around hundreds of important targets are built. Simultaneously, Israel reinforces its position on the east bank of the Suez Canal by construction of the Bar Lev Line.
- November 3, 1968: Egyptian MiG-17s attack Israeli positions, and are met by Israeli interceptors. One Israeli plane is damaged.
- December 1, 1968: Israeli helicopter-borne commandos destroy four bridges near Amman, Jordan.
- December 3, 1968: The Israeli Air Force bombs PLO camps in Jordan. The Israeli jets are intercepted by Hawker Hunters of the Royal Jordanian Air Force, and an Israeli fighter jet is damaged during the brief air battle.

=== 1969 ===
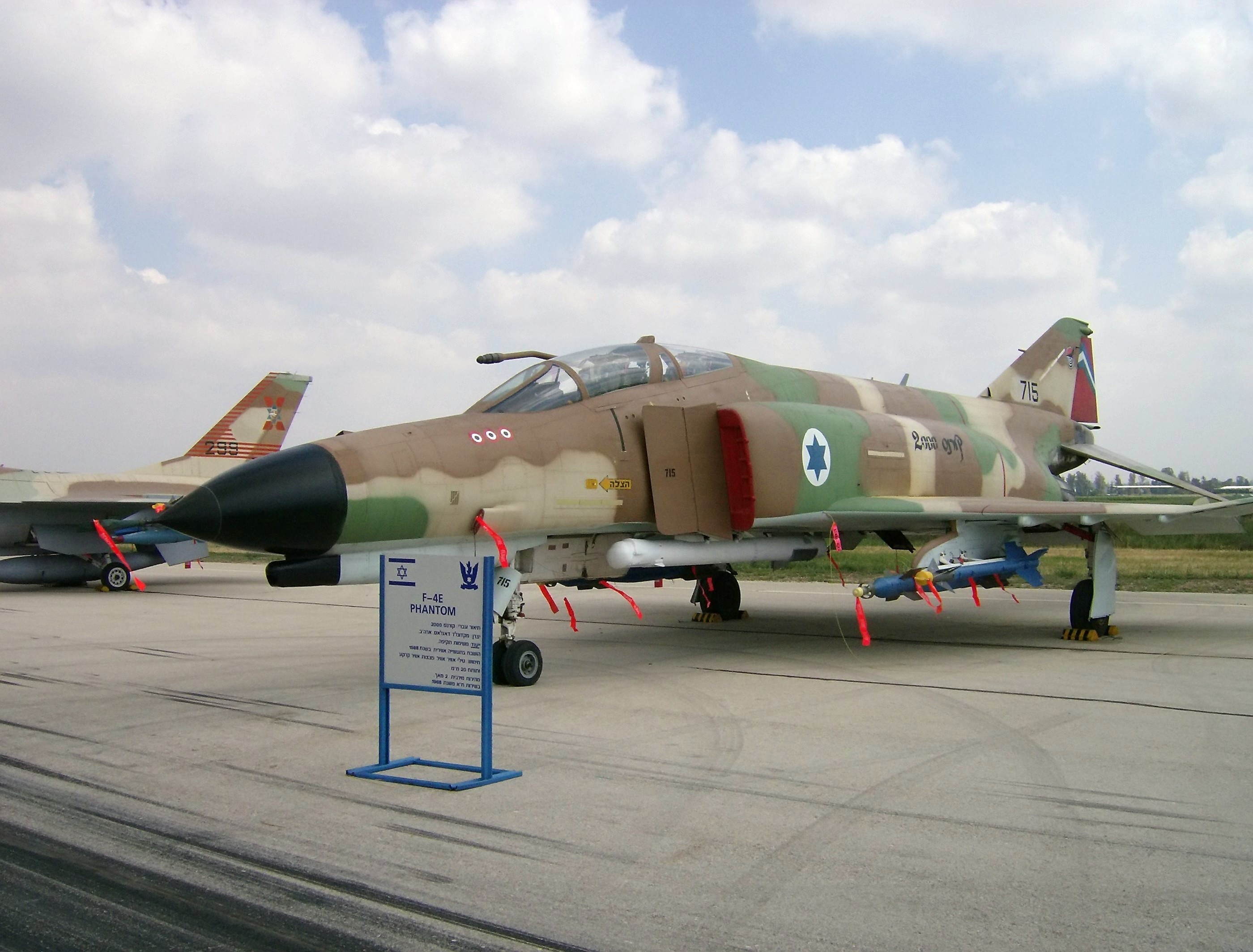
A F-4E Phantom of the Israeli Air Force. The aircraft was used to good effect as "flying artillery" during the war. Roundel markings on nose credit this aircraft with three aerial kills.

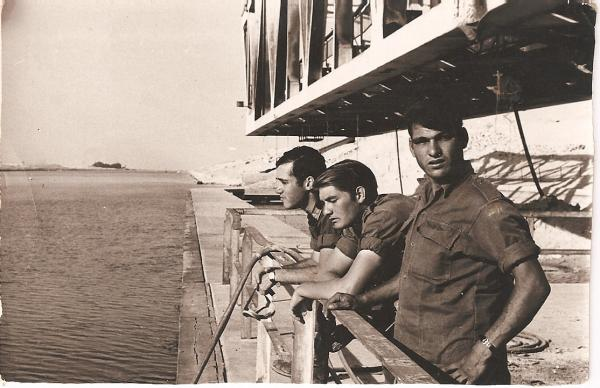
Israeli troops at the Firdan Bridge by the Suez Canal, 1969

- March 8, 1969: Egypt strikes the Bar Lev Line with artillery fire and airstrikes, causing heavy casualties. Israel retaliates with raids deep into Egyptian territory, causing severe damage.
- March 9, 1969: The Egyptian Chief of Staff, General Abdul Munim Riad, is killed in an Israeli mortar attack while visiting the front lines along the Suez Canal.
- May–July 1969: Heavy fighting takes place between Israeli and Egyptian forces. Israel loses 47 dead and 157 wounded, while Egyptian casualties are far heavier.
- July 18, 1969: Egyptian commandos raid Israeli military installations in Sinai.
- July 19–20, 1969: Operation Bulmus 6 – Israeli Shayetet 13 and Sayeret Matkal commandos raid Green Island, resulting in the total destruction of the Egyptian facility. Six Israeli soldiers and 80 Egyptian soldiers are killed. Some Egyptian casualties are caused by their own artillery.
- July 20–28, 1969: Operation Boxer – Nearly the entire Israeli Air Force attacks the northern sector of the Canal, destroying anti-aircraft positions, tanks and artillery, and shooting down eight Egyptian aircraft. An estimated 300 Egyptian soldiers are killed, and Egyptian positions are seriously damaged. Israeli losses amount to two aircraft. Egyptian artillery fire is reduced somewhat. However, shelling with lighter weapons, particularly mortars, continues.
- July–December 1969: Israel carries out its "flying artillery" campaign, employing widespread air raids against Egyptian positions in the Suez Canal. In August alone, the Israeli Air Force flew about 1,000 combat sorties against Egypt, destroying dozens of SAM sites and shooting down 21 aircraft for the loss of three aircraft. Israeli jets flew low to avoid Egypt's SAM-2 missile defenses. Soviet advisers sometimes counted up to eighty Israeli sorties per day in a single sector. Egypt's SAM-2 batteries were severely mauled, causing Egyptian artillery crews to become more reluctant to engage and reveal their positions, enabling Israeli tanks to emerge from cover and take direct aim at Egyptian positions. Several Soviet advisors to Egyptian forces were killed in the bombing campaign. The Soviets subsequently introduced the Strela-2 missile to target high-flying aircraft, shooting down an Israeli A-4 Skyhawk on August 19.
- September 9, 1969: Operation Raviv – Israeli forces raided Egypt's Red Sea coast. The raid was preceded by Operation Escort, with Shayetet 13 naval commandos infiltrating the Egyptian Navy anchorage at Ras Sadat with Maiale manned torpedoes and sinking a pair of Egyptian torpedo boats with limpet mines to prevent them from interfering with the operation. As they made their getaway, the self-destruct mechanism on one of the Maiales accidentally detonated. Three Israeli Navy landing craft then landed the raiding force on the coast, with the Israelis wearing Egyptian uniforms and using captured Arab T-55 tanks and BTR-50 armored personnel carriers painted in Egyptian colors. The Israeli force, backed by air support, destroyed 12 Egyptian military outposts. Israeli A-4 Skyhawks backing up the operation attacked an Egyptian radar site, during which one of the Skyhawks was shot down. After nine hours of operating unhindered in enemy territory, the raiding force withdrew and rendezvoused with the landing craft and returned to Israeli-held territory in the Sinai, having suffered only one light injury during the mission. The Egyptians suffered 100–200 casualties. Two Soviet military advisors including a colonel were killed.
- September 11, 1969: Sixteen Egyptian aircraft carry out a strike mission. Eight MiGs are shot down by Israeli Mirages and a further three Su-7s are lost to Israeli anti-aircraft artillery and HAWK surface-to-air missiles.
- October 17, 1969: The United States and Soviet Union begin diplomatic talks to end the conflict.

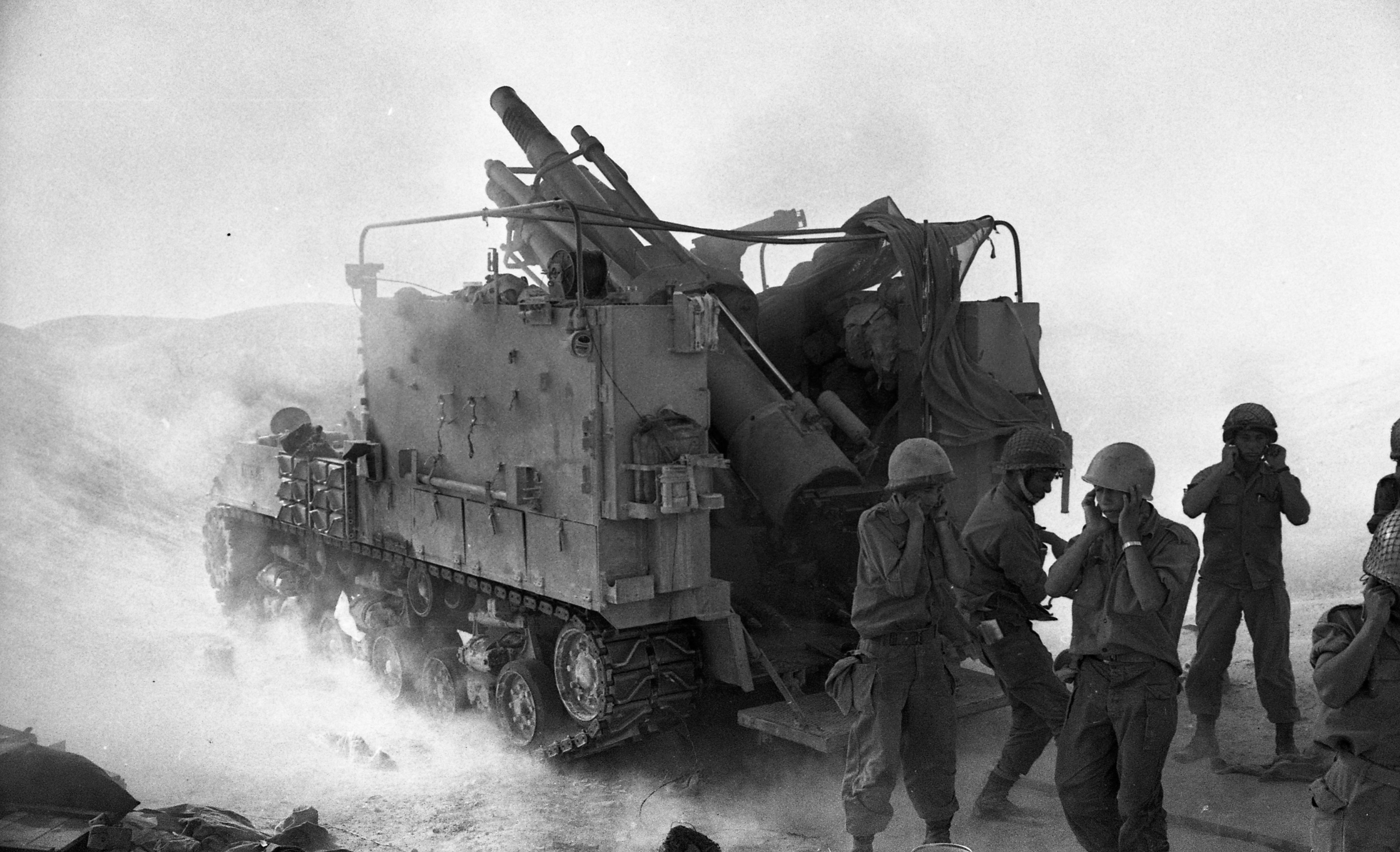
Israeli artillery in action in 1969

- October 27, 1969: Over the previous days, air and artillery duels took place in the canal zone. One Israeli soldier was killed and ten wounded in a surprise Egyptian air attack. One Egyptian MiG-17 was shot down by an Israeli Hawk missile. Israeli aircraft also raided Egyptian positions along the canal. On the Jordanian front, one Israeli soldier was killed and two wounded in the Beisan valley in mortar attacks from Jordan. Four Arab guerrillas were killed in a clash with an Israeli patrol along the Jordan River and Israeli jets attacked Arab guerrilla positions in Jordan, striking targets in the suburbs of Amman.
- December 9, 1969: Egyptian aircraft, with the assistance of newly delivered P-15 radars, defeat the Israelis in an aerial engagement, shooting down two Israeli Mirages. Later in the evening, an Egyptian fighter flown by Lt. Ahmed Atef shot down an Israeli F-4 Phantom II, making him the first Egyptian pilot to shoot down an F-4 in combat. The same day, the Rogers Plan is publicized. It calls for Egyptian "commitment to peace" in exchange for the Israeli withdrawal from Sinai. Both parties strongly reject the plan. Nasser forestalled any movement toward direct negotiations with Israel. In dozens of speeches and statements, Nasser posited the equation that any direct peace talks with Israel were tantamount to surrender. President Nasser instead opts to plead for more sophisticated weaponry from the Soviet Union to withstand the Israeli bombings. The Soviets initially refuse to deliver the requested weapons.
- December 26–27, 1969: Israel launches Operation Rooster 53. As Israeli aircraft attack Egyptian positions along the canal, Israeli paratroopers ferried by Super Frelon helicopters, which use the noise of the air attacks as cover, land at Ras Ghareb and capture an Egyptian P-12 radar facility, overwhelming its light security contingent. Two Egyptian personnel are killed and four captured. The paratroopers then take apart the radar, with the radar's pieces being ferried away by two Israeli Sikorsky CH-53 Sea Stallion helicopters. The operation enabled Israeli and American learning of the latest Soiviet radar technology, and caused a huge morale impact on the Egyptians.

=== 1970 ===
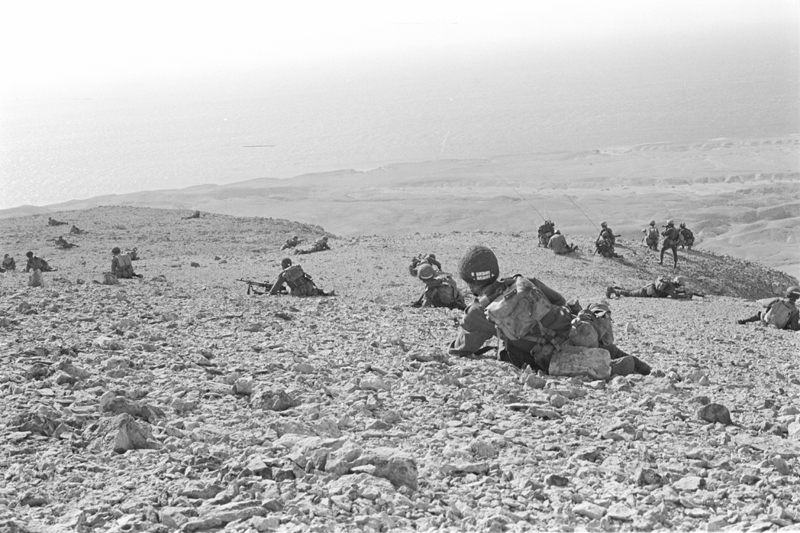
Israeli paratroopers in action during Operation Rhodes, 1970

- January 7, 1970: Israel launched Operation Priha, a series of air raids against military targets in the Egyptian heartland, as far as 100 miles from the canal. A total of 118 sorties were ultimately undertaken between January 7 and April 13. Also on January 7, a Soviet adviser to an Egyptian infantry brigade was killed in an Israeli attack.
- January 12, 1970: Two Egyptian Sukhoi Su-7 fighters were shot down by Israeli Hawk missiles while attacking an Israeli base near Ras Sudar. Israel also reported that in the past days, Israeli forces killed 12 Arab guerrillas and captured four in a series of clashes in the Arabah region and Jordan Valley.
- January 22, 1970: With Egypt's air defense system having largely been devastated and the deep-penetration bombing raids hitting further into Egypt, President Nasser secretly flew to Moscow to discuss the situation. His request for new SAM batteries (including the 2K12 Kub and Strela-2) was approved. Their deployment requires qualified personnel along with squadrons of aircraft to protect them. Thus, he needed Soviet military personnel in large numbers, something the Kremlin did not want to provide. Nasser then threatens to resign, implying that Egypt might turn to the United States for help in the future. The Soviets had invested heavily in President Nasser's regime, and so, the Soviet leader, General-Secretary Leonid Brezhnev, finally obliged. The Soviet Union, which had already been increasing its military presence in Egypt from the summer of 1969 and deployed its first fighter jets in December of thar year, decided to greatly increase its military presence, deploying additional air defense units alongside fighter aircraft. The Soviet military intervention was codenamed Operation Kavkaz. The Soviet presence increased from 2,500 to 4,000 in January to 10,600–12,150 ground personnel plus 100–150 pilots by June 30.

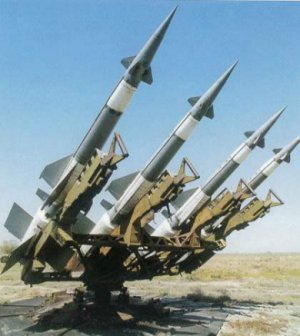
Soviet/Egyptian S-125 anti-aircraft type missiles in the Suez Canal vicinity

- January 22, 1970: Operation Rhodes. Israeli paratroopers and naval commandos are transported by IAF Super Frelon helicopters to Shadwan Island where they capture the island and dismantle a British-made Egyptian Decca radar and other military equipment for transport back to Israel before withdrawing. Meanwhile, Israeli fighter jets provide close air support and sink two Egyptian P-183 torpedo boats approaching the island. An estimated 70 Egyptian soldiers were killed and 62 more were taken prisoner while the Israelis lost 3 killed and 7 wounded.
- January 26, 1970: Israeli aircraft attacked an Egyptian auxiliary ship in the Gulf of Suez, damaging it and causing it to ground on a reef.
- January 28, 1970: Israeli bombing was reported to have killed six Soviet personnel, three in an attack on a building in a suburb of Cairo that housed Soviet advisors and three in a SAM complex at Dashur. Two months later, US National Security Advisor Henry Kissinger told Israeli ambassador to the US Yitzhak Rabin that 40 Soviet personnel had been killed in the bombing at Dashur.
- February 1970: Two Israeli auxiliary vessels were sabotaged by Egyptian frogmen in Eilat harbor. A supply ship sank while a coastal landing craft sustained damage but was beached by its crew before sinking. There were no casualties. In response, Israeli warplanes sank an Egyptian minelayer in the Gulf of Suez, carried out raids against Egyptian military positions in the canal zone, and struck two military targets deeper into Egyptian territory. Egyptian aircraft also raided Israeli positions along the Suez Canal, injuring three Israeli soldiers. Four days of fighting took place between Israeli and Syrian forces as well. Israeli fighter jets accidentally struck an industrial plant at Abu Zaabal, killing 80 workers.
- February 1970: An Egyptian commando platoon attempts to set up an ambush in the vicinity of the Mitla Pass but is discovered. The entire unit is either killed or captured.
- February 9, 1970: An air battle between Israeli and Egyptian warplanes takes place, with each side losing one plane.
- March 15, 1970: The first fully operational Soviet SAM site in Egypt was completed. It was part of three brigades which the Soviet Union sent to Egypt. Israeli F-4 Phantom II jets repeatedly bombed Egyptian positions.
- April 1970: The Kuwaiti Armed Forces suffered their first fatality on the Egyptian front.
- April 8, 1970: The Israeli Air Force carried out bombing raids against targets identified as Egyptian military installations. A group of military bases about 30 kilometers from the Suez Canal was bombed. However, in what became known as the Bahr el-Baqar incident, Israeli F4 Phantom II fighter jets attacked a single-floor school in the Egyptian town of Bahr el-Baqar, after it was mistaken for a military installation. The school was hit by five bombs and two air-to-ground missiles, killing 46 schoolchildren and injuring over 50. This incident put a definite end to Operation Priha, and the Israelis instead then concentrated on attacking Canal-side installations. The respite gave the Egyptians time to reconstruct their SAM batteries closer to the canal. Soviet MiG fighters provided the necessary air cover. Soviet pilots also began approaching IAF aircraft during April 1970, but Israeli pilots were given orders not to engage these aircraft and break off whenever Soviet-piloted MiGs appeared.
- April 19, 1970: Three Israeli soldiers were killed and eight wounded in a series of Egyptian air raids in the Suez Canal and Gulf of Suez areas. One Egyptian Sukhoi Su-7 was shot down by an Israeli MIM-23 Hawk anti-aircraft missile, killing the pilot. Two more Egyptian planes were seen to be hit but no wreckage was found.
- April 29-30, 1970: Four Israeli soldiers were killed and 18 wounded in Egyptian artillery barrages along the Suez Canal. In a clash between Israeli troops and guerrillas along the Israel-Lebanon border an Israeli soldier and guerrilla were killed. Israeli aircraft bombed Egyptian targets in the Suez Canal area and two guerrilla bases along the Lebanese border. On the night of 30 April-1 May, an Egyptian commando raid was repulsed, with at least 30 Egyptian soldiers estimated to have drowned when their four rubber boats were sunk by Israeli fire as they retreated. Two Israeli soldiers were killed by Egyptian artillery fire that preceded and followed the raid.
- May 1970: An Israeli fishing boat was sunk by the Egyptian Navy, killing two of its crew. The Israeli Air Force launched a heavy series of bombing raids against Egyptian targets throughout the canal zone and shot down five Egyptian warplanes. Israeli aircraft sank an Egyptian destroyer and minelayer. Two Israeli soldiers were killed by Egyptian shelling and a civilian Israeli frogman was also killed by explosives planted by Egyptian frogmen while removing underwater wreckage at the port of Eilat. During the final days of the month, the IAF launched major air raids against Port Said, believing a large amphibious force is assembling in the town. On the 16th an Israeli aircraft was shot down in air combat, probably by a MiG-21.
- May 3, 1970: Twenty-one Palestinian guerrillas were killed by Israeli troops in the Jordan Valley.
- May 20, 1970: Israeli troops repulsed an Egyptian commando raid in the canal zone. The Egyptian raiding party retreated under cover of Egyptian artillery fire and Israeli forces responded with artillery fire and airstrikes. Seven of the Egyptian commandos were killed and the Israeli account claimed that the Egyptians also suffered casualties from Israeli retaliatory shelling and airstrikes. Israeli losses were two killed and one injured. Israeli and Jordanian forces also exchanged mortar fire in the northern Beisan Valley.
- May 30, 1970: 15 Israeli soldiers were killed, 8 were wounded, and 2 were presumed captured on the same day in three separate ambushes. Israeli armored patrols were ambushed twice on the Suez Canal by Egyptian commandos, resulting in 13 Israeli soldiers dead, 4 wounded, and 2 missing and presumed taken prisoner. In the Jordan Valley, north of Jericho, an army patrol was ambushed by Arab guerrillas, resulting in 2 dead and 4 wounded. It was not known whether the clashes resulted in any Arab casualties. In response, Israeli warplanes launched a massive bombing campaign against the Port Said area, hitting Egyptian artillery positions. Soviet warships were present and some fired on the Israeli planes. Several Soviet naval personnel were killed when shrapnel from the bombing hit a Soviet warship.
- June 1970: An Israeli armored raid on Syrian military positions resulted in "hundreds of Syrian casualties."
- June 4, 1970: Israeli fighter jets shot down three Egyptian fighter jets in a dogfight over the northern Suez Canal zone. Israeli aircraft also bombed Egyptian military targets for hours. Jordanian long-range artillery shelled Tiberias, killing two people, resulting in retaliatory Israeli artillery fire.
- June 25, 1970: An Israeli A-4 Skyhawk, in an attack sortie against Egyptian forces on the Canal, was attacked and pursued by a pair of Soviet MiG-21s into Sinai. According to the Soviets, the plane was shot down, while the Israelis said it was damaged and forced to land at a nearby airbase.
- June 27, 1970: The EAF continued to launch air raids across the canal. On June 27 around eight Egyptian Su-7s and MiG-21s attacked Israeli rear areas in Sinai. According to Israel, two Egyptian aircraft were shot down. An Israeli Mirage was shot down, and the pilot was captured.
- June 1970: The Kuwaiti Armed Forces suffered sixteen fatalities on the Egyptian front.
- June 30, 1970: Soviet air defenses shot down two Israeli F-4 Phantoms. Two pilots and a navigator were captured, while a second navigator was rescued by helicopter the following night.
- July 18, 1970: A force of 24 Israeli F-4 Phantom fighter jets attacked SAM batteries in Egypt, destroying all the targeted batteries and killing eight Soviet personnel. One Israeli F-4 Phantom was shot down and another was severely damaged but managed to return to base.
- July 30, 1970: A large-scale dogfight occurred between Israeli and Soviet aircraft, codenamed Rimon 20, involving 12 to 24 Soviet MiG-21s (besides the initial 12, other MiGs were "scrambled", but it is unclear if they reached the battle in time), and 12 Israeli Dassault Mirage IIIs and four F-4 Phantom II jets. The engagement took place west of the Suez Canal. After luring their opponents into an ambush, the Israelis shot down five of the Soviet MiGs. Four Soviet pilots were killed, while the IAF suffered no losses except a damaged Mirage.
- August 3, 1970: The Soviets responded by luring Israeli fighter jets into a counter-ambush. Dummy missile batteries had been set up to lure Israeli fighter jets in while the real missiles were concealed. When the Israeli attack came, one Israeli F-4 Phantom was shot down and another was hit but managed to return to base.
- Early August, 1970: Despite their losses, the Soviets and Egyptians managed to press the air defenses closer to the canal. The batteries allowed the Egyptians to move in artillery which in turn threatened the Bar Lev Line. Following the Soviets' direct intervention, known as "Operation Kavkaz", Washington feared an escalation and redoubled efforts toward a peaceful resolution to the conflict.
- August 7, 1970: A cease-fire agreement was reached, forbidding either side from changing "the military status quo within zones extending 50 kilometers to the east and west of the cease-fire line." Minutes after the cease-fire, Egypt began moving SAM batteries into the zone even though the agreement explicitly forbade new military installations. By October there were approximately one hundred SAM sites in the zone.
- September 28, 1970: President Nasser died of a heart attack, and was succeeded by Vice President Anwar Sadat.

== Aftermath ==
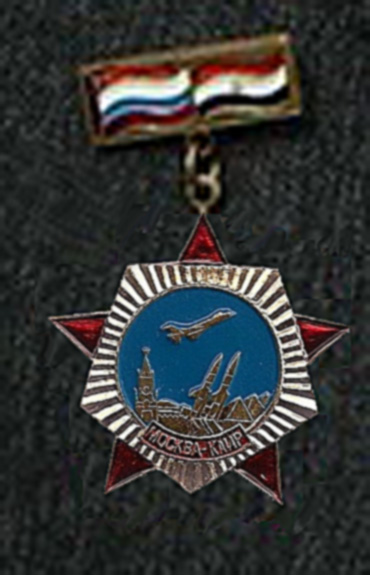
Soviet medal issued to Soviet military personnel who served in Egypt during the War of Attrition. The medal says Москва-Каир (Moscow-Cairo).

Various historians have commented on the war with differing opinions. Chaim Herzog notes that Israel withstood the battle and adapted itself to a "hitherto alien type of warfare." Ze'ev Schiff notes that though Israeli military suffered losses, they was still able to preserve their military accomplishments of 1967 and that despite increased Soviet involvement, Israel had stood firm.

Simon Dunstan wrote that Israel was successful in continuing to hold the Bar Lev Line and forcing the Egyptians to come to the negotiating table, although the war had sapped Israeli morale. However, he claimed that the war's conclusion "led to a dangerous complacency within the Israeli High Command about the resolve of the Egyptian armed forces and the strength of the Bar-Lev Line" while the Egyptians saw the war as a great victory in spite of their heavy casualties and the mauling their air defenses had sustained, becoming confident in their ability to counter Israel's air power.

Gideon Remez and Isabella Ginor consider the war to have been a defeat for Israel, arguing that Israel was compelled to accept the ceasefire because Soviet air defenses were downing Israel's F-4 Phantoms at an unsustainable rate. They argued that Egypt's blatant violation of the ceasefire by moving SAM batteries into the canal zone after the war's end without response was a sign of Israel's failure. They consider the lopsided Israeli victory over the Soviets in Operation Rimon 20 as having enabled Israel to accept the ceasefire without losing face, with that battle and illustrious tactical exploits by Israeli ground troops being used to claim victory.

Soviet-born Israeli researcher Boris Dolin also considers the war to have been an Israeli defeat due to the effectiveness of Soviet SAM batteries against Israel's Phantom fleet: "Contrary to the official version, the ceasefire was not an Israeli victory over Egypt. Quite the opposite, it was an expression of Israeli defeat at the hands of an effective and determined Soviet force. Facing the crushing power of the Soviet Union, Israel could only display relatively limited capabilities. We found ourselves up against a giant, and without a real military solution."

US diplomat David A. Korn, who served as political officer and chief of the political section at the US embassy in Tel Aviv during the war, considers the war to have ended in a stalemate, with no clear victor or vanquished on either side, but claimed that "this fact was poorly understood in Israel, where the war was retrospectively deemed a success for Israeli arms." He wrote that Israel's failure to acknowledge that the war was not an Israeli victory led it into a false sense of security, which resulted in opportunities for an interim peace with Egypt being neglected. However, he also claimed that it is a matter of speculation as to whether the Yom Kippur War could have been avoided had the outcome been analyzed more realistically by Israel and the United States.

Howard Sachar notes that Israel accepted the ceasefire because it was clear that the war was developing into a Soviet-Israeli confrontation, the Israeli military had taken significant casualties, and because the United States offered additional sales of F-4 Phantoms to induce Israel into accepting it, while Egypt accepted it because it was desperate for a break in the wake of its heavy casualties and the near-depopulation of the cities in the canal zone. After Egypt violated the ceasefire by moving forward its SAM batteries, the United States offered additional F-4 Phantoms after Israel considered retaliation. Although the ceasefire was set to last three months, in practice it continued after that.

Israeli military historian Yaniv Friedman claimed that Israel's aggressive policy in directly striking Soviet troops was a success, in that it helped persuade the Soviets to push for a ceasefire: "The Russians understood well that the conflict is not worth it. Humiliations, loss of prestige, and the understanding that just because Israel isn't currently revealing to the world that it shoots down Russians doesn't mean that it will always keep quiet. Further escalation could also bring the US into the theater, something that scared the Russians." He credited Israel with successfully asserting itself against a global power. According to Friedman, even though Israeli decision-makers recognized the disparity in strength, the war involved a core Israeli national security interest while to the Soviet Union it was one theater among many.

== Casualties ==
Israeli war ribbon signifying participation in the War of Attrition

According to the military historian Ze'ev Schiff, some 921 Israelis, of whom 694 were soldiers and the remainder civilians, were killed on all three fronts. Chaim Herzog notes a slightly lower figure of just over 600 killed and some 2,000 wounded while Netanel Lorch states that 1,424 soldiers were killed in action between the period of June 15, 1967 and August 8, 1970. Avi Kober estimated Israel's total military and civilian dead at 726, of whom 367 were soldiers killed on the Egyptian front between June 1967 and August 1970 and 359 were soldiers and civilians killed along the Syrian and Jordanian fronts. Between 24 and 26 Israeli aircraft were shot down. A Soviet estimate notes aircraft losses of 40. One destroyer, the INS Eilat, was sunk.

As with the previous Arab–Israeli wars of 1956 and 1967, Arab losses far exceeded those of Israel, but precise figures are difficult to ascertain because official figures were never disclosed. The lowest estimate comes from the former Egyptian Army Chief of Staff, Saad el Shazly, who notes Egyptian casualties of 2,882 killed and 6,285 wounded. Historian Benny Morris states that a more realistic figure is somewhere on the scale of 10,000 soldiers and civilians killed. Ze'ev Schiff notes that at the height of the war, the Egyptians were losing some 300 soldiers daily and aerial reconnaissance photos revealed at least 1,801 freshly dug graves near the Canal zone during this period. Among Egypt's war dead was the Egyptian Army Chief of Staff, Abdul Munim Riad.

Between 98 and 114 Egyptian aircraft were shot down, though a Soviet estimate notes air losses of 60. Several Egyptian naval vessels were also sunk.

Soviet forces are known to have sustained significant losses. One Russian veterans' website compiled an admittedly incomplete list of 58 dead, including victims of accidents and disease. In August 1970, the French newspaper Le Figaro reported that 100 Soviet military personnel had been killed in Egypt over the past year. Five Soviet MiG-21 aircraft were shot down in aerial combat during Operation Rimon 20.

The PLO suffered 1,828 killed and 2,500 captured. An estimated 300 Jordanian soldiers and 500 Syrian soldiers were killed. Cuban forces, which were deployed on the Syrian front, were estimated to have lost 180 dead and 250 wounded.

== See also ==
Conflicts

- 1967–71 Gazan insurgency
- Black September
- List of modern conflicts in the Middle East
- Yom Kippur War

Politics

- Camp David Accords (1978)
- Egypt–Israel peace treaty (1979)

People

- Ahmad Ismail Ali
- Ami Ayalon
- Haim Bar-Lev
- Leonid Brezhnev
- Moshe Dayan
- Saad el-Shazly
- Mohamed Fawzi
- Gunnar Jarring
- Gamal Abdel Nasser
- Nikolai Podgorny
- Yitzhak Rabin
- Abdul Munim Riad
- William P. Rogers
- Anwar Sadat
- Ariel Sharon

== Bibliography ==
- Pollack, Kenneth (2002). Arabs at War: Military Effectiveness. University of Nebraska Press.
- Bar-Simon Tov, Yaacov. The Israeli-Egyptian War of Attrition, 1969–70. New York: Columbia University Press, 1980.
- Dunstan, Simon (2003). Yom Kippur War 1973: The Sinai Campaign. Osprey Publishing. ISBN 978-1-84176-221-0.
- Herzog, Chaim and Gazit Shlomo. The Arab-Israeli Wars: War and Peace in the Middle East. New York: Vintage Books, 2004.
- Morris, Benny (1999). Righteous Victims: A History of the Zionist-Arab Conflict, 1881–1999. Knopf. ISBN 978-0-679-42120-7.
- Nicolle, David; Cooper, Tom (2004). Arab MiG-19 and MiG-21 Units in Combat (First ed.). Osprey Publishing. p. 96. ISBN 978-1-84176-655-3.
- Rabinovitch (2004). The Yom Kippur War: The Epic Encounter That Transformed the Middle East. Schocken Books. ISBN 978-0-8052-4176-1.
- Schiff, Zeev, History of the Israeli Army 1870–1974, Straight Arrow Books (1974). ISBN 0-87932-077-X.
- Whetten, Lawrence L. (1974). The Canal War: Four-Power Conflict in the Middle East. Cambridge, Mass.: MIT Press. ISBN 978-0-262-23069-8.
- Insight team of the London Sunday Times, Yom Kippur War, Doubleday & Company (1974)
- Remez, Gideon and Ginor, Isabella: The Soviet-Israeli War 1967-1973: The USSR's Military Intervention in the Egyptian-Israeli Conflict (2017)
- Korn, David A. (1992). Stalemate: The War of Attrition and Great Power Diplomacy in the Middle East, 1967–1970. Westview Press. ISBN 978-0-8133-8237-1.
