= Operation Bulmus 6 =

Military raid during the War of Attrition

Coordinates: 29.9118°N 32.5299°E

- Part of the War of Attrition
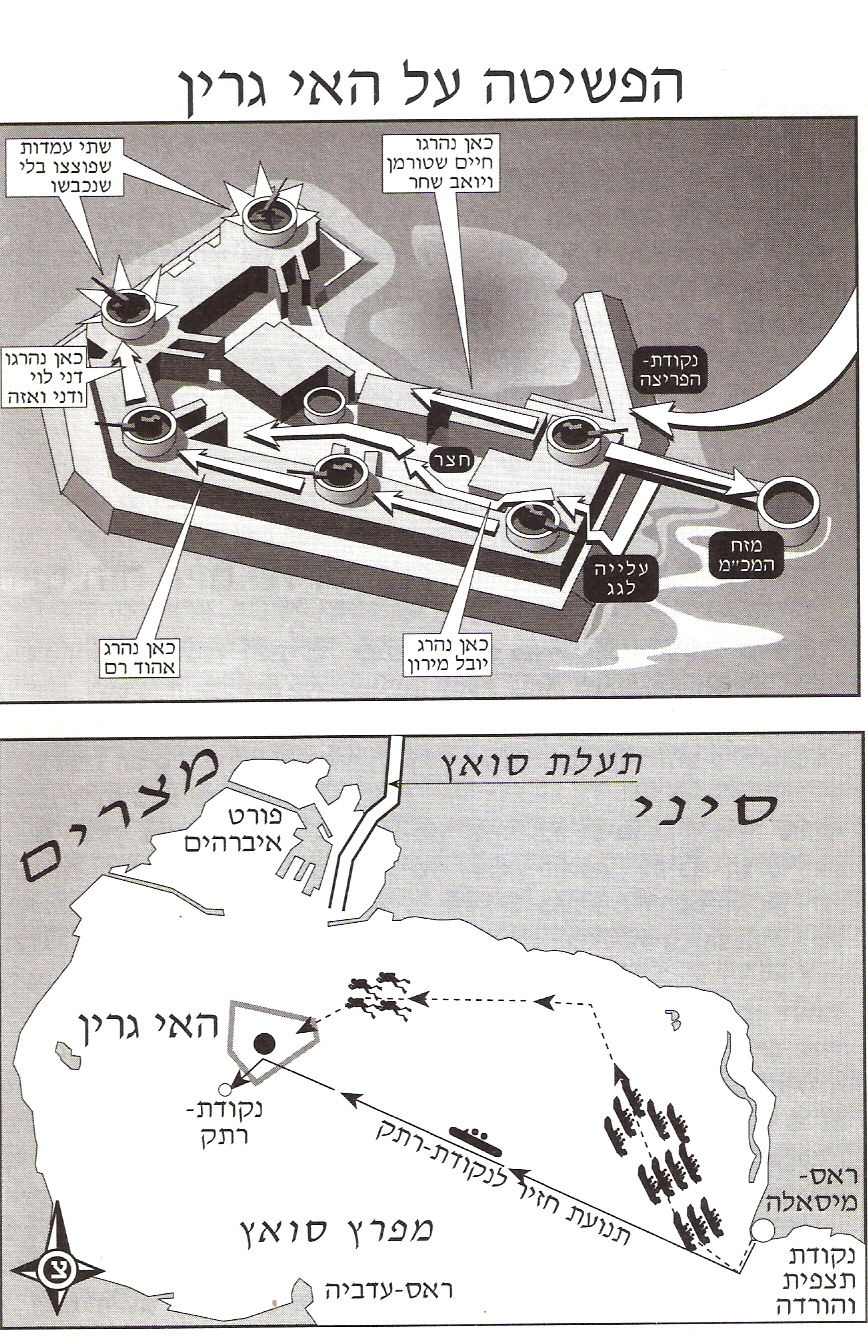
- Description of the attack on Green Island
Date	19 July 1969
Location	Green Island, Gulf of Suez
Result	Israeli victory

Belligerents
Israel	Egypt; Sa'ka Forces

Commanders and leaders
(Israel) Ze'ev Almog (Israel) Ami Ayalon (Israel) Menachem Digli	(Egypt) Captain Magdy Bishara Qalini (Egypt) Lieutenant Mohamed Abdel Hamid Abdel Latif (Egypt) Lieutenant Mustafa Abdel Rahim Abu Sedira (Egypt) Major General Muhammad Faiq Al-Borini (Commander of the Third Field Army)

Strength
40+ Sayeret Matkal and Shayetet 13	Egypt: ~75 infantry, 30 Signalers; As-Sa'iqa: 12 commandos

Casualties and losses
6 killed 11 wounded	80 killed

Operation Bulmus 6, also known as the Green Island Raid, was a military raid conducted by special operations units of the Israel Defense Forces (IDF) against what was believed to be an Egyptian early-warning radar and ELINT station located on a small artificial island in the Gulf of Suez on the night of 19 July 1969.

== Background ==
Green Island, or Al Jazeera Al Khadraa, was a fortress built by British forces during World War II. Located 4 kilometres (2.5 mi) south of the city of Suez and the mouth of the Suez Canal, it was a series of concrete bunkers sitting atop an 8-foot-high (2.4 m) seawall, ringed by razor wire three rolls deep. Only 145 metres (476 ft) long and 50 metres (160 ft) wide, the island was heavily defended. Its garrison consisted of approximately seventy Egyptian infantrymen and twelve As-Sa'iqa commandos, fourteen machine gun positions, two 37-mm anti-aircraft guns, and four 85-mm anti-aircraft guns. The island and surrounding area were within range of both Israeli and Egyptian artillery sited on opposite shores of the gulf.

Though the destruction of Egyptian early warning radar and ELINT sites was an ongoing goal during this period, known as the War of Attrition, the raid was as much prompted by a wish to send a "message" to Egypt as it was the actual destruction of the military targets. IDF Chief of Staff Chaim Bar Lev and Minister of Defense Moshe Dayan together decided that Egypt should be shown that no Egyptian position was safe, no matter how well-fortified or impregnable. As a target, Green Island fulfilled both goals. Green Island could have been more easily attacked by Israeli artillery or aircraft with less risk to Israeli life, but a commando raid would send a clear message and, it was hoped, have a negative effect on Egyptian military forces' morale.

== Prelude ==
It was decided that the operation would be a combined operation, split between elements of Israel's Sayeret Matkal General Staff Reconnaissance unit and Shayetet 13 Naval Commandos. Lieutenant Colonel Zeev Almog commanded the operation. The specific priorities were set at destruction of the 85 mm anti-aircraft guns, then the main northern building, then the radar and ELINT site.

The plan called for the Naval Commandos, using Zodiac inflatable boats, to lead the first of two waves in the assault. The second wave, by Sayeret Matkal, would consist of commandos, command and control and medical teams, and an extraction team. The second wave commandos would arrive to carry the fight just as the first wave ran low on ammunition.

== Battle ==
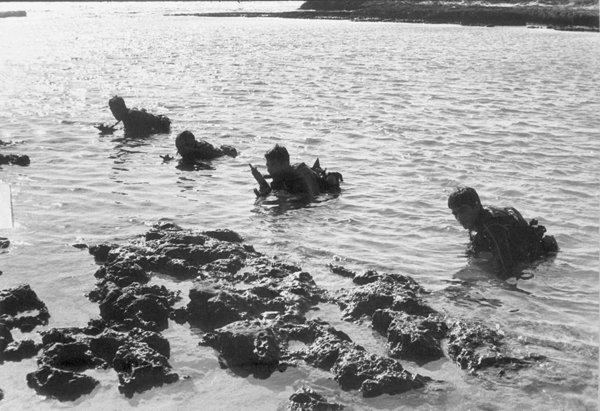
Israeli naval commandos during the War of Attrition

The first wave consisted of four teams of two officers and three commandos each and departed from the vicinity of Ras Sudar on the east bank of the Gulf of Suez at 2030. They approached to within 900 metres (980 yd) of the island by boat, then swam, first on the surface and once closer underwater using rebreathers. Each man carried 40 kilograms (88 lb) of equipment. They surfaced at the island 8 minutes behind schedule, at 0138. The delay was caused by a more difficult swim than anticipated due to the currents. The first team cut through the barbed wire allowing the second team to move in and counter the initial Egyptian response. The third team then crossed a small bridge and destroyed a defensive and observation tower and radar facility. The fourth team cleared a building to the north.

Half the raiders cleared or blocked the southern half of the island and the fortress, while the other half eliminated the anti-aircraft equipment and determined that the radar was fake. The operation was complicated by the fact that most of their hand grenades were rendered useless by the swim at deeper than expected depths due to each man's heavy load. This breaching of the island's defences was supported by a separate Naval Commando team providing covering fire and diversion with a bazooka and a light machine gun from a small rock outcropping just south of the island, having reached it by Swimmer Delivery Vehicles (SDV). At this point the commander of the first wave, Lieutenant Dov Bar, signalled the second wave to come in using a flare. To avoid catching the approaching second wave in a cross fire a second flare by Bar signalled the covering fire and diversion team on the rock outcropping to stand down and withdraw, which they did successfully. The second wave, which had been idling in their Zodiacs in the Gulf, now trailing the first wave's recovered boats, roared up to the island. They quickly set up a command post and aid station and took out the 85 mm gun emplacements.

Not much larger than a football field, all combat on the island was conducted at close range. The Egyptian response to the first wave was uncoordinated at first, then became fierce, employing heavy and light machine guns and rocket-propelled grenades. After the arrival of the second wave, the efforts of the defenders became sporadic and again uncoordinated, with some jumping from bunkers into the sea, and eventually calling in artillery on their own position.

The extraction was ordered at 0215. By 0255 the teams were aboard the Zodiacs and heading for the eastern bank of the Gulf, having lost one Zodiac at the island to Egyptian artillery fire. At 0310, with the Israeli commandos still crossing the Gulf, satchel charges left on the island detonated destroying the remaining facilities. Egyptian artillery now shelled both the Zodiacs and the beachheads set up to receive them, driving several boats away and delaying their landings while they searched for alternate beaches to divert to. Another Zodiac was lost when it was abandoned by its team less than 400 meters from Green Island, but the team was recovered by helicopter at 0500 after spending several hours swimming toward the eastern shore.

== Aftermath ==
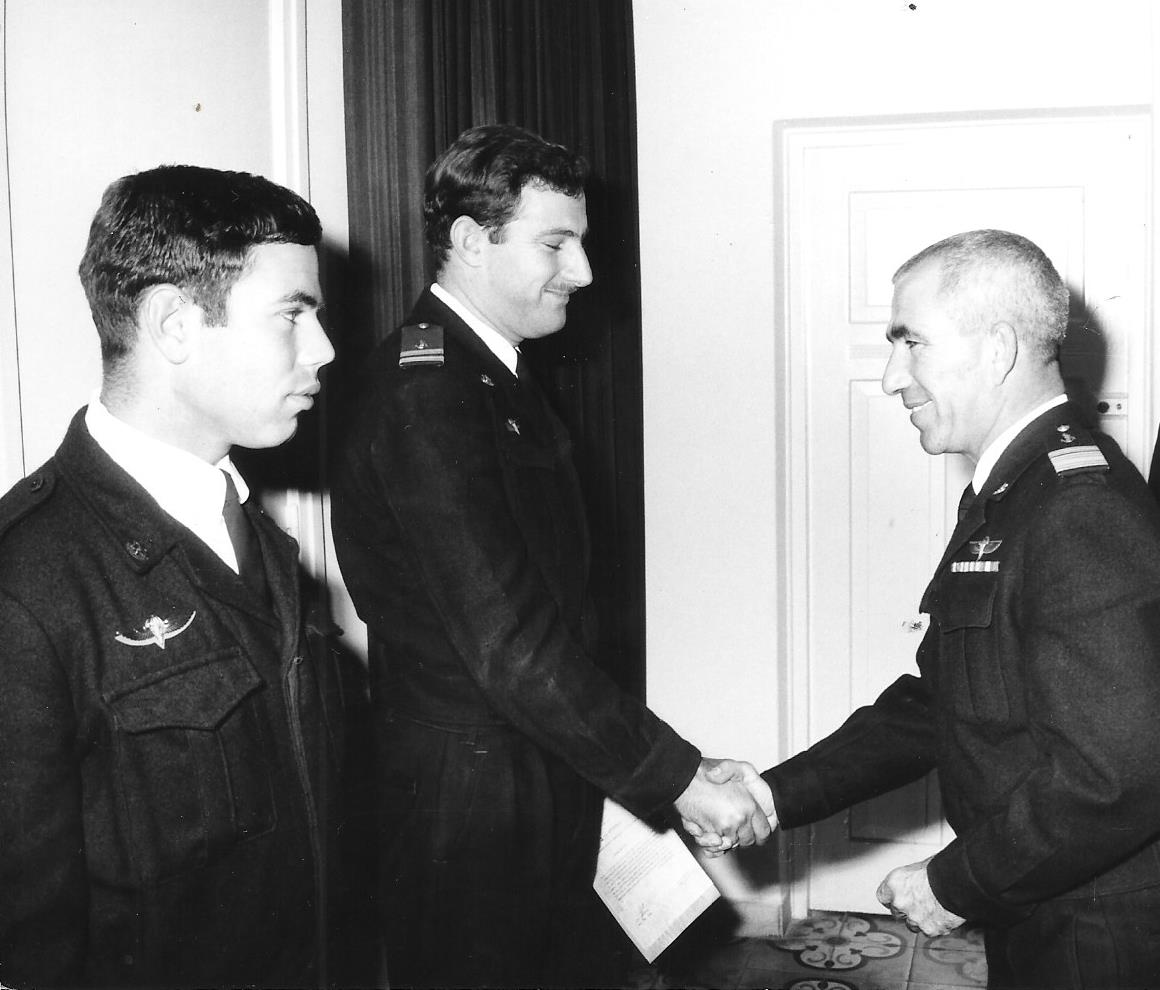
Head of the Israeli Navy Avraham Botzer greeting two soldiers that participated in the operation

The result of the raid was the destruction of the entire Egyptian facility at Green Island. Israeli casualties were three Sayeret Matkal and three Shayetet 13 commandos killed, and eleven wounded—a casualty rate of approximately fifty percent. Egyptian casualties were 80 killed (almost the entire garrison) and an unknown number wounded. A number of the Egyptian casualties were caused by friendly fire; the shelling of the island by their own artillery. Following the raid the Israeli Air Force exploited the hole in Egyptian air defenses to launch Operation Boxer, engaging the Egyptian Air Force in over 300 dogfights and bombing raids. Naval Commando conducted another 80 raids along the Suez Canal until the 1970 cease-fire ended the War of Attrition.

Ami Ayalon received the Medal of Valor, Israel's highest decoration, for his actions during the battle.

== See also ==
- 1967 Six Day War
- 1973 Yom Kippur War
