= Royal Yugoslav Air Force Detachment =

- Active: 25 November 1943 – 24 August 1945
- Country: Kingdom of Yugoslavia; United States
- Branch: United States Army Air Forces
- Role: Strategic bombing
- Size: Detachment
- Part of: 512th Bombardment Squadron
- Garrison/HQ: San Pancrazio Airfield
- Engagements: World War II; Operation Shingle; Battle of Monte Cassino; Operation Grapeshot

The Royal Yugoslav Air Force Detachment was a United States Army Air Forces detachment composed of aviators from the Royal Yugoslav Air Force formed in November 1943, attached to the 512th Bombardment Squadron of the 376th Bombardment Group. Several hundred Royal Yugoslav Air Force personnel escaped capture in the April War in 1941 and met with Allied forces in Egypt. Forty of these aviators were selected in 1942 to undergo additional training in Florida and California. These men were then assigned to the Royal Yugoslav Air Force Detachment, officially formed on 25 November 1943, and saw service throughout the remainder of the war as part of the 512th Squadron. The unit saw action in the Mediterranean Theater and flew four B-24 Liberator aircraft, only one of which remained in service by the time of the detachment's disbandment in August 1945. 13 personnel transferred to the USAAF when the unit was disbanded, while several others joined the newly-formed Yugoslav Air Force.

== See also ==
- Yugoslav Army Outside the Homeland
- Balkan Air Force
