= Green Island (Egypt) =

Small artificial island in the Red Sea

Coordinates: 29.9118°N 32.5299°E

Green Island (Arabic: الجزيرة الخضراء) (Note: Transliterated as: el-Gezīra el-Khadra / al-Jazīrah al-Khaḍrāʼ / al-Ǧazīrah al-Ḫaḍrāʾ / al-jazīra al-ḵaḍrāʾ) is a small (145 m long x 50 m) artificial island in the Red Sea at the southern mouth of the Suez Canal.

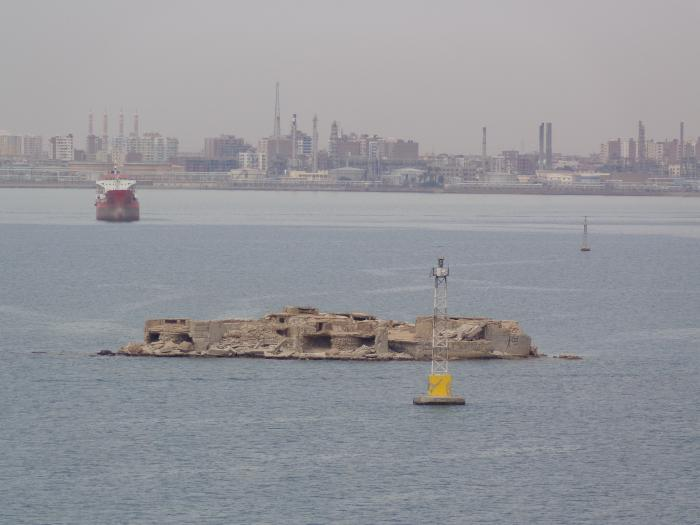
Ruins of the fortress, 2016

== History ==
Green Island was a fortress built by the British Army (probably by British Troops in Egypt or Rear-Admiral, Alexandria, Royal Navy) to protect the Suez Canal from air and sea attack during World War II. This waterway was of enormous strategic significance for Britain at this time. Located three kilometers south of Port Ibrahim and four kilometers south of the city of Suez and the mouth of the Suez Canal, the fortress was built on a bed of stable corals and made out of reinforced concrete. It consisted of a one-storey building with a large courtyard. At one end of the island, a concrete bridge jutted out into the water toward a circular five-metre-high tower supporting a radar site and two heavy anti-aircraft machine guns. A wall reinforced with thick rows of barbed wire was built at the water's edge, to deter attack from the sea. Heavy machine guns were emplaced in the roof, and there were over a dozen machine gun nests. A series of concrete bunkers sat atop an 8-foot-high (2.4 m) seawall, ringed by razor wire three rolls deep. There were several gun emplacements.

In 1969, during the War of Attrition between Israel and Egypt, the island was heavily defended. Its garrison consisted of approximately 70 Egyptian infantrymen and 12 special forces commandos, 14 machine gun positions (14.5 mm to 25 mm), two 37 mm anti-aircraft guns, and four 85 mm anti-aircraft guns. On the night of July 19, 1969 the island was raided by Israeli commandos (Operation Bulmus 6). The Egyptian facilities on the island were completely destroyed with Israeli casualties of three Sayeret Matkal and three Shayetet 13 commandos killed, and 11 wounded.

== See also ==
- 1967 Six Day War
- 1973 Yom Kippur War
