= Gideon Remez =

Israeli journalist (born 1946)

Gideon Remez (Hebrew: גדעון רמז; born 2 June 1946) is an Israeli journalist and an analyst on post-Soviet affairs.

== Biography ==
Gideon Remez was born in Tel Aviv on June 2, 1946. His father, Aharon Remez, was an Israeli diplomat and military officer who served as the second commander of the Israeli Air Force. His grandfather, David Remez, was an Israeli politician who was a signatory to the Israeli Declaration of Independence.

== Career ==
Remez headed the foreign news desk at the Voice of Israel. He is a fellow of the Harry S. Truman Research Institute for the Advancement of Peace at the Hebrew University of Jerusalem.

He was a recipient, joint with Isabella Ginor, of the 2008 Book Prized (Silver Medal) by the Washington Institute for Near East Policy for the book Foxbats over Dimona.

In 1993 he received also the Nahum Sokolov Award ("Israeli Pulitzer Prize”) for broadcast journalism. In 1999 he received the Joint Distribution Committee’s Boris Smolar Award for coverage of Israel-Diaspora relations . In 2000 he received the honorable mention in the B'nai B'rith Wolf Matsdorf Journalism Awards.

== Publications ==
- Foxbats over Dimona: The Soviets' Nuclear Gamble in the Six-Day War ( Yale University Press, 2007).
- "The Origins of a Misnomer: The 'Expulsion of Soviet Advisers' from Egypt in 1972," in Nigel J. Ashton (ed.), The Cold War in the Middle East: Regional Conflict and the Superpowers 1967–73, London: Routledge-LSE, 2007.
- "The USSR Sets Precedents: Military Involvement and Nuclear Threat in the 1956 Crisis” (Hebrew). Paper presented at a conference at Haifa University, November 2006, forthcoming in a book of the conference proceedings, 2009.
- "Un-Finnished Business: Archival Evidence Exposes the Diplomatic Aspect of the USSR's Pre-Planning for the Six-Day War," Cold War History 6:3 (August 2006).
- "The Spymaster, the Communist, and Foxbats over Dimona: The Motive for the USSR's Instigation of the Six-Day War," Israel Studies 11:2 (Summer 2006).
- "The Six-Day War as a Soviet Initiative: New Evidence and Methodological Issues," MERIA12: 3 (September 2008)
- "Too Little, Too Late: The CIA and US Counteraction of the Soviet Initiative in the Six-Day War” [forthcoming in a special edition of Intelligence & National Security, 2010].

== See also ==
- Six-Day War
