= Isabella Ginor =

Israeli journalist

- איזבלה גינור
- Born: Ukraine
- Education: Tel Aviv University
- Occupations: Journalist, Analyst
- Known for: Analysis on post-Soviet affairs, co-authoring Foxbats over Dimona
- Awards: Washington Institute for Near East Policy Book Prize (Silver Medal, 2008)

Isabella Ginor (Russian: Изабелла Гинор, Hebrew: איזבלה גינור) is an Israeli journalist and analyst on post-Soviet affairs.

== Biography ==
Isabella Ginor was born in Ukraine and immigrated to Israel in 1967. She studied at Tel Aviv University and is a fellow of the Harry S. Truman Research Institute for the Advancement of Peace at the Hebrew University of Jerusalem.

Ginor was a recipient, together with Gideon Remez, of the 2008 Book Prize (Silver Medal) by the Washington Institute for Near East Policy for Foxbats over Dimona.

== Published works ==
- Isabella Ginor (1989), מטפורה (in German), ספרית פועלים, p. 128 [Online=https://books.google.com/books?id=slo2AAAAMAAJ]
- Isabella Ginor (June 10, 2000). "How Six Day war almost led to Armageddon". The Guardian.
- Изабелла Гинор (October 11, 2000). "Джихад из Багдада". Время новостей, N°144. Archived from the original on October 3, 2012.
- Изабелла Гинор (March 7, 2002). "Арафат забыт, но не прощен". Время новостей. Archived from the original on October 3, 2012.
- Isabella Ginor. "THE COLD WAR'S LONGEST COVER-UP: HOW AND WHY THE USSR INSTIGATED THE 1967 WAR". MIDDLE EAST REVIEW OF INTERNATIONAL AFFAIRS (MERIA) JOURNAL Volume 7, Number 3 (September 2003).
- Изабелла Гинор (April 24, 2003). "Москва собиралась уничтожить Израиль". Едиот Ахронот.
- Изабелла Гинор; Гидеон Ремез (October 10, 2003). "Судный день Советского Союза начался на Востоке". vremya.ru.
- Isabella Ginor, Gideon Remez: Un-Finnished Business: A Never-sent Diplomatic Note Confirms Moscow's Premeditation of the Six-Day War . In: The Sixth Nordic Conference on Middle Eastern Studies : Revised draft. — Copenhagen: Danish Institute for International Studies, DIIS, 8–10 October 2004.
- Isabella Ginor, Gideon Remez: Foxbats Over Dimona: The Soviets' Nuclear Gamble in the Six-Day War. — Yale University Press, 2007. — 287 Seiten — ISBN 0300123175, 9780300123173
- Изабелла Гинор; Гидеон Ремез (June 5, 2007). ""Время новостей": Ядерные игры перед короткой войной". newsru.co.il.
- Isabella Ginor; Gideon Remez (October 8, 2008). "Analysis: Back to the USSR". jpost.com.
- Isabella Ginor; Gideon Remez (September 8, 2008). "The Six-Day War as a Soviet Initiativ: New Evidence and Methodological Issues". worldsecuritynetwork.com.
- Изабелла Гинор; Гидеон Ремез (October 6, 2008). "Кровавая ближневосточная ничья. Неоцененный вклад Советского Союза в войну Судного дня". vremya.ru.
- Изабелла Гинор (2009-09-21). "Обама, Нетаньяху и Аббас встречаются в Нью-Йорке". rfi.fr.

== See also ==
- Journalism in Israel
