= Abu Suweir Air Base =

Egyptian Air Force base

Abu Suweir Air Base RAF Abu Sueir LG 200/206
- Ismailia, Ismailia Governorate in Egypt

Site information
- Owner: Egyptian Armed Forces
- Operator: Egyptian Air Force

Location
- Shown within Egypt Abu Suweir Air Base (Asia) Abu Suweir Air Base (Africa)
- Coordinates: 30°34′20″N 032°05′45″E

Site history
- Built: 1919
- In use: 1919-1956; 1956 - present

Airfield information
- Elevation: 14 metres (46 ft) AMSL
Runways
Direction	Length and surface
09/27	2,972 metres (9,751 ft) Asphalt
11/29	2,960 metres (9,711 ft) Asphalt

Abu Suweir Air Base is an Egyptian Air Force (Arabic: القوات الجوية المصرية, El Qūwāt El Gawwīyä El Maṣrīyä) base, located approximately 17.1 kilometres (10.6 mi) west of Ismailia and 116 kilometres (72 mi) northeast of Cairo. It is positioned for strategic defence of the Suez Canal waterway.

== Second World War and Suez Crisis ==
During the Second World War the airfield, then known as RAF Abu Sueir or Abu Sueir Airfield (LG-205) was used as a military airfield by the Royal Air Force of the United Kingdom and the American United States Army Air Forces during the North African campaign against Axis forces.

USAAF Ninth Air Force units which used the airfield were:

- 376th Bombardment Group, 8 November 1942-January 1943, Consolidated B-24 Liberator

512th Bombardment Squadron, 9 November 1942-10 February 1943
513th Bombardment Squadron, 8 November 1942-10 February 1943
514th Bombardment Squadron, 8 November 1942-10 February 1943
515th Bombardment Squadron, 8 November 1942-6 February 1943

Royal Air Force units:

- No. 6 Squadron RAF initially between 13 and 27 November 1951 then between 28 January and 31 May 1952. Then finally between 28 July and 18 August 1952 with the de Havilland Vampire FB.5 & FB.9
- No. 13 Squadron RAF between 1 January 1955 and 10 February 1956 with the Gloster Meteor PR.10
- No. 37 Squadron RAF between 29 June and 6 November 1942 with the Vickers Wellington IC
- No. 40 Squadron RAF reformed here on 1 May 1942, staying until 23 June 1942 using the Wellington IC, returning on 31 October 1945 with the Consolidated Liberator VI, converting to the Avro Lancaster B.7. The squadron departed on 17 September 1946
- No. 46 Squadron RAF between 16 July and 10 September 1941 without any aircraft
- No. 70 Squadron RAF between 29 June and 6 November 1942 with the Wellington IC
- No. 80 Squadron RAF between 8 and 19 November 1940 with Gloster Gladiator I & II
- No. 84 Squadron RAF between 3 December 1955 and 11 March 1956 with the Vickers Valetta C.1
- No. 89 Squadron RAF between 10 December 1941 and 28 January 1943 with the Bristol Beaufighter IF & VIF
- No. 104 Squadron RAF between 31 October 1945 and 1 July 1946 with the Liberator VI converting to the Lancaster B.7(FE)
- No. 114 (Hong Kong) Squadron RAF between 1 December 1955 and 20 March 1956 with the Valetta C.1
- No. 145 Squadron RAF between 1 June and 25 August 1918 with the Royal Aircraft Factory S.E.5a
- No. 208 Squadron RAF between 15 October 1951 and 17 January 1956 with the Meteor FR.9
- No. 213 (Ceylon) Squadron RAF between 22 May and 2 July 1941 with the Hawker Hurricane I
- No. 214 (Federated Malay States) Squadron RAF between August 1919 and February 1920 with the Handley Page Type O/400
- No. 216 Squadron RAF between July 1920 and 15 April 1921 with the O/400 and the Airco DH.10 Amiens
- No. 223 Squadron RAF detachment between September 1942 and January 1943 with the Martin Baltimore III
- No. 252 Squadron RAF detachment between April and June 1941 with the Beaufighter IC
- No. 272 Squadron RAF between 28 May and 14 June 1941 with the Beaufighter IC
- No. 450 Squadron RAAF between 12 May and 23 June 1941 without any aircraft

Royal Air Force units:

In the mid-1950s, the base was the last station to be handed over by the RAF to the Egyptians. This was despite the fact that Abu Sueir and Fanara were the two bases to be retained, to be maintained by civilian contractors.

The main body of 2nd Battalion Grenadier Guards, the last British Army fighting unit remaining in Middle East Land Forces amid the Suez Crisis, left on 24–25 March 1956 by ship; they had been located at Golf Course Camp in Port Said. The last remaining rear-guard company of the battalion left by air on 2 April 1956 from Abu Sueir.

Abu Sueir was handed over to Egypt on 14 April 1956.

== Twenty-first century ==
Today, the airfield is an active Egyptian Air Force Base. Its Second World War configuration is still evident in aerial photography. It houses the 60th Tactical Fighter Squadron of the 262nd Tactical Fighter Wing, flying General Dynamics F-16C/D Block 40s Fighting Falcons.

== See also ==
- List of North African airfields during World War II
