= Assassination Bureau =

Assassination Bureau can refer to:

- The Assassination Bureau, a 1969 British film.
- Assassination Bureau, an organization of assassins in DC Comics.
