= Ben Cross =

British actor (1947–2020)

- Born: Harry Bernard Cross; 16 December 1947; London, England
- Died: 18 August 2020 (aged 72); Vienna, Austria
- Education: Royal Academy of Dramatic Art
- Occupation: Actor
- Years active: 1973–2020
- Spouses: Penelope Butler (m. 1977; div. 1992) Michele Moerth (m. 1996; div. 2005) Deyana Boneva (m. 2018)
- Children: 2

Harry Bernard Cross (16 December 1947 – 18 August 2020) was an English actor. He was best known for his portrayal of the British Olympic athlete Harold Abrahams in the 1981 film Chariots of Fire and for playing Billy Flynn in the original West End production of the musical Chicago.

== Early life, family and education ==
Harry Bernard Cross was born in London on 16 December 1947, to a working class family. He was the son of Catherine (née O'Donovan), a cleaner, and Harry Cross, a doorman. His father died of tuberculosis when Cross was eight years old. Cross was raised in the Tulse Hill neighbourhood of London in his Irish mother's Catholic faith, although his father was a member of the Church of England.

== Career ==
=== Early career ===
Cross started his career by taking manual jobs, including working as a window cleaner, waiter, and joiner. He also worked as a carpenter for the Welsh National Opera, and was the Property Master at The Alexandra theatre in Birmingham.

In 1970 at the age of 22, he was accepted into London's Royal Academy of Dramatic Art (RADA), but later expressed little interest in pursuing the classical arts route.

After graduating from RADA, Cross performed in several stage plays at The Dukes theatre in Lancaster where he was seen in Macbeth, The Importance of Being Earnest and Arthur Miller's Death of a Salesman. He then joined the Prospect Theatre Company and played roles in Pericles, Twelfth Night, and The Royal Hunt of the Sun. Cross also joined the cast of the musical Joseph and the Amazing Technicolor Dreamcoat and played leading roles in Peter Shaffer's Equus, Mind Your Head, and the musical Irma la Douce — all at the Leicester Haymarket Theatre.

Cross's first big-screen film appearance came in 1976 when he went on location to Deventer, Netherlands, to play Trooper Binns in Joseph E. Levine's Second World War epic A Bridge Too Far, which starred an international cast, including Dirk Bogarde, Sean Connery, Michael Caine and James Caan.

In 1977, Cross became a member of the Royal Shakespeare Company; he performed in the premiere of Privates on Parade as "Kevin Cartwright" and played Rover in a revival of a Restoration play titled Wild Oats. Cross's path to international stardom began in 1978 with his performance in the musical Chicago, in which he played Billy Flynn, the slick lawyer of murderess Roxie Hart.

=== 1980s–1990s ===
During Cross's performance in Chicago he was recognised and recommended for a leading role in the multiple Oscar-winning film Chariots of Fire in 1981. The film was based on the true story of two athletes in the 1924 Olympics: Eric Liddell, a devout Scottish Christian, and Harold Abrahams, an English Jew who runs to overcome prejudice. Cross trained hard for his role as Abrahams; his co-star Ian Charleson played Liddell. The pair were shown in the opening scene running barefoot with a group of others along a Scottish beach, accompanied by Vangelis's music. Considered "one of the most memorable opening scenes in film history", Cross acknowledged the scene's effectiveness but remembered the water was freezing. For their performances in the film, Cross and Charleson both won "Most Promising Artiste of 1981" awards from the Variety Club Awards in February 1982. Cross's starring role in Chariots of Fire has been credited with continuing a transatlantic trend in elegant young English actors that had been set by Jeremy Irons in Brideshead Revisited. The film went on to win multiple Academy Awards, including the one for Best Picture.

Cross followed up Chariots of Fire with performances as a Scottish physician, Dr Andrew Manson, struggling with the politics of the British medical system during the 1920s, in The Citadel, a 10-part BBC Television dramatisation of A. J. Cronin's novel, and as Ashton (Ash) Pelham-Martyn, a British cavalry officer torn between two cultures in the HBO/Goldcrest miniseries The Far Pavilions first broadcast in the UK by Channel 4.

In 1982, the U.S. union Actors' Equity, in a landmark reversal of a previous ruling, allowed Cross to appear in John Guare's off-Broadway play Lydie Breeze. The decision was tied to a joint effort by Actors' Equity, the League of New York Theatres and the British union Equity to allow British and U.S. actors unrestricted opportunities to work in both countries. The agreement eventually led to regular equal exchange agreements for equivalent acting jobs between London and New York City.

During the 1984 Summer Olympic Games, Cross appeared in a commercial for American Express ('Don't leave home without it') with the 87-year-old Jackson Scholz, a sprinter for the 1924 American Olympic team whose character was featured in the film Chariots of Fire. When Cross talks about beating Scholz, the latter remarks, "You didn't beat me!" with mock indignation. Proving he is 'still pretty fast', Scholz beats Cross to the draw in picking up the tab with his credit card.

He subsequently replaced James Garner as the featured actor endorsing the Polaroid Spectra camera in 1986. Cross was also featured in GQ Magazine as one of the annual "Manstyle" winners in January 1985 followed by a featured photo shoot in March 1985.

In 1985, he played Barney Greenwald in a revival of Herman Wouk's courtroom drama The Caine Mutiny Court-Martial at the Queen's Theatre, London, alongside castmates Charlton Heston (as Captain Queeg) and John Schuck.

In a 1985 interview, the actor admitted he preferred American roles because of their emotionalism, saying of English acting: "Over here, people hide behind mannerism and technique and don't come up with any soul. American actors are much freer with the emotions. It's pretty hard in Europe not to have experience of Americans because we're exposed to a lot of American product." Cross also said that he was sympathetic to the American dream of success: "I am ambitious. There's no point of being ashamed of the fact that one has ambitions. Despite what a lot of people think in our profession, you can have ambitions and still turn in good work and still earn a living. There's no clash there." Cross expressed the hope that his reputation would "span the Atlantic," and that those in the industry would not ignore him because he did not live in Los Angeles or New York City. "A prospective director would have to convince me that I could bring something new, fresh and exciting to a classical part that hundreds of other people have played," he said.

During this time, Cross' career included several roles in made-for-television productions, as well as the stage. In the 1988 HBO spy film Steal the Sky he played Munir Redfa, an Iraqi pilot blackmailed into flying a MiG aircraft from Iraq to Israel. In Ian Sharp's 1989 NBC-TV miniseries Twist of Fate, he played German Nazi SS colonel and war criminal Helmut von Schraeder, who has his face and voice surgically changed to pose as a Jew in a concentration camp to avoid both Hitler's retaliation for his role in the failed 20 July plot against him and war's end capture and post-war war crimes trial and punishment by the approaching Allies, then after his liberation at the war's end by the title's name becomes a Zionist and one of Israel's early founders and leading military generals. He twice portrayed a vampire, first in the 1989 USA Network film Nightlife, then again as Barnabas Collins in the 1991 MGM remake of the cult classic TV soap opera Dark Shadows. Cross also appeared as Sir Harold Pearson in the 1994 Italian production Caro Dolce Amore (Honey Sweet Love), Solomon in the 1997 Trimark Pictures production Solomon and Captain Nemo in the 1997 CBS film 20,000 Leagues Under the Sea.

=== 2000–2020 ===
Cross played Ikey Solomon in the Australian production The Potato Factory in 2000. In 2005, Cross, an anti-death penalty campaigner, starred as a death-row prisoner in Bruce Graham's play Coyote on a Fence, at the Duchess Theatre. He played Rudolf Hess in the 2006 BBC production Nuremberg: Nazis on Trial.

In November 2007, Cross was cast in the role of Sarek in the 2009 Star Trek film directed and produced by J. J. Abrams. Cross spoke to Star Trek magazine following the film's release, saying:

My agent put me forward for Star Trek, and he sent a couple of films to J.J. I'm sure he was too busy to watch the whole of Species, but when we were on the set, he mentioned to me that there was one particular shot in it where I turned to the camera, and in that moment, it came to him how perfect it would be for me to play Sarek.

In order to prepare for the role, Cross drew on his experience as a parent as well as Sarek's previous on-screen appearances. Having been present when his daughter was born, he was able to "call on all sorts of things" in the scene where Amanda has baby Spock, a scene which did not make it into the theatrical cut of the film. While he found the emotionless trait of a Vulcan a challenge to play, he found the father/son relationship between Sarek and Spock easier to play. According to Cross:

As Sarek, I had to be true to the Vulcan cultural ethic, which in the beginning, I found very difficult. I got a lot of help with that from J.J. Dealing with the adult Spock (played by Zachary Quinto) was a much more mature relationship, and I found the father/son aspect one of the easier things to play.

In 2012, Cross was cast as Rabbit, the main antagonist on the Cinemax original series Banshee. Rabbit is "a ruthless Ukrainian gangster who has been hunting down two of his former top thieves for 15 years." After 2012, Cross acted in various minor films but also acted in The Hurricane Heist, which earned a box office of US$32.5 million. In 2019, he starred with Whoopi Goldberg in the film Master of Dark Shadows, which earned a rating of 100% on Rotten Tomatoes, his second film to receive such a rating, the other one being Paperhouse.

=== Directing, screenwriting, and music ===
Cross was also a director, writer, and musician. He wrote music, screenplays, and articles for English-language publications, and the lyrics for an album with Bulgarian singer Vasil Petrov, which was released in late 2007. He sang two Frank Sinatra songs with Petrov in the Apollonia Festival at the Black Sea in September 2007.

Among his works was the musical Rage about Ruth Ellis, which was performed in the London area. He starred in it and played the part of the hangman.

Cross's first single as a lyricist was released by Polydor Records in the late 1970s and was titled "Mickey Moonshine". The nom de guerre for the performance had occurred to Cross when he recalled an earlier involvement with the music industry as a session singer for Decca Records between 1972 and 1974. At this time, he recorded a song called "Name it, You Got it", which achieved some play on the British Northern soul scene. His other musical works include The Best We've Ever Had and Nearly Midnight, both written by Cross and directed by his son Theo.

The original soundtrack for Nearly Midnight was written, produced and performed by his daughter Lauren. These works were performed in Edinburgh in 2002 and 2003, respectively. Square One, directed by Cross, was performed at the Etcetera Theatre in London in 2004.

== Personal life ==
From 1977 to 1992, Cross was married to model Penelope Butler and had two children, Lauren and Theo. He was later married to gyrotonics trainer Michele Moerth, from 1996 to 2005. Both these marriages ended in divorce. In 2018, he married the Bulgarian artist Deyana Boneva, to whom he remained married until his death. In his later years, he lived primarily in Sofia, Bulgaria.

Cross was an active Freemason for the final 10 years of his life. Initiated in 2010 in the Shakespear Lodge (London), he attended lodge meetings in the UK and across Europe, eventually serving as a Grand Steward in the United Grand Lodge of England from 2017 to 2018. In this capacity he took part in the ceremonial tercentenary event at the Royal Albert Hall on 31 October 2017, celebrating three hundred years since the formation of the first English Grand Lodge, in which a dramatic presentation starred various actors, led by Sir Derek Jacobi, Samantha Bond, and Sanjeev Bhaskar.

== Death ==
Cross died of cancer in Vienna on 18 August 2020, aged 72. He had recently finished two films, Prey for the Devil and The Last Letter from Your Lover, which were released posthumously.

== Filmography ==
=== Film ===
| Year | Title | Role | Notes |
|---|---|---|---|
| 1977 | A Bridge Too Far | Trooper Binns | |
| 1981 | Chariots of Fire | Harold Abrahams | |
| 1984 | The Far Pavilions | Ash | |
| 1985 | The Assisi Underground | Rufino Niccacci | |
| 1988 | The Unholy | Father Michael | |
| 1988 | Paperhouse | Dad | |
| 1988 | La bottega dell'orefice | Stephane | |
| 1991 | Eye of the Widow | Nassiri | |
| 1992 | Live Wire | Mikhail Rashid | |
| 1993 | Cold Sweat | Mark Cahill | |
| 1994 | The Ascent | Major David Farrell | |
| 1995 | First Knight | Prince Malagant | |
| 1995 | Hellfire | Marius Carnot | |
| 1997 | Turbulence | Captain Samuel Bowen | |
| 1997 | The Invader | Renn | |
| 1999 | Tower of the Firstborn | Michael Shannon / Zadick | |
| 1999 | The Venice Project | Rudy Mestry / Bishop Orsini | |
| 2002 | She, Me & Her | David Greenbaum | comedy, Austria, 99 minutes |
| 2004 | Exorcist: The Beginning | Semelier | |
| 2005 | The Mechanik | William Burton | |
| 2006 | Behind Enemy Lines II: Axis of Evil | Commander Tim Mackey | Direct to video |
| 2006 | Wicked Little Things | Aaron Hanks | |
| 2007 | When Nietzsche Wept | Josef Breuer | |
| 2007 | Finding Rin Tin Tin | Nikolaus | |
| 2008 | Hero Wanted | Cosmo Jackson | Direct to video |
| 2008 | War, Inc. | Medusa Hair | |
| 2009 | Star Trek | Sarek | |
| 2013 | Jack the Giant Killer | Agent Hinton | Direct to video |
| 2013 | A Common Man | Morris Da Silva | |
| 2018 | The Hurricane Heist | Sheriff Jimmy Dixon | |
| 2019 | Jarhead: Law of Return | USMC General Betz | |
| 2019 | Wildings | Mr. Kane | |
| 2020 | The Rest is Ashes | Old George Smith | |
| 2021 | The Last Letter from Your Lover | Older Anthony | Posthumous release |
| 2022 | Prey for the Devil | Cardinal Matthews | Posthumous release |

=== Television ===
| Year | Title | Role | Notes |
|---|---|---|---|
| 1979 | ITV Playhouse | Terry Jones | Episode: "The Wrinkler" |
| 1980 | The Professionals | Stuart | Episode: "Black Out" |
| 1981 | The Flame Trees of Thika | Ian Crawford | 4 episodes |
| 1982 | Coming Out of the Ice | General Tuchachevsky | Television film |
| 1983 | The Citadel | Dr. Andrew Manson | Miniseries |
| 1984 | The Far Pavilions | Ashton (Ash) Pelham-Martyn | Miniseries |
| 1986 | The Twilight Zone | Frederick | Episode: "Devil's Alphabet" |
| 1987 | The Grand Knockout Tournament | Himself | Television special |
| 1988 | Steal the Sky | Munir Redfa | Television film |
| 1989 | Twist of Fate | Col. Helmut von Schrader/Israeli Brig. Gen. Benjamin Grossman | Minseries |
| 1989 | Nightlife | Vlad | A comedy-horror TV movie made for the USA Network. This was the first time Cross played a vampire, at least one year ahead of his starring role in Dark Shadows |
| 1991 | Dark Shadows | Barnabas Collins | Main cast, 12 episodes |
| 1991 | She Stood Alone | William Lloyd Garrison | Television film |
| 1992 | The Diamond Fleece | Rick Dunne / Alex Breuer | Television film |
| 1992 | The Ray Bradbury Theater | Ettil Vyre | Episode: "The Concrete Mixer" |
| 1992 | Tales from the Crypt | Benjamin A. Polosky | Episode: "Seance" |
| 1996 | Poltergeist: The Legacy | Samuel Warden | Episode: "The Substitute" |
| 1997 | 20,000 Leagues Under the Sea | Captain Nemo | Television film |
| 1997 | Solomon | Solomon | Television film |
| 2000 | The Potato Factory | Ikey Solomon | Mini Series |
| 2004 | Spartacus | Titus Glabrus | Mini Series |
| 2005 | Icon | Anatoly Grishin | Television film |
| 2006 | S.S. Doomtrooper | Doctor Ullman | Television film |
| 2006 | Hannibal – Rome's Worst Nightmare | Quintus Fabius Maximus Verrucosus | Television film |
| 2006 | Nuremberg: Nazis on Trial | Rudolf Hess | Miniseries |
| 2007 | Grendel | King Hrothgar | Television film |
| 2007 | Species: The Awakening | Tom Hollander | Television film |
| 2008 | Lost City Raiders | Nicholas Filiminov | Television film |
| 2009 | Hellhounds | King Leander | Television film |
| 2010 | Ben Hur | Emperor Tiberius | Miniseries |
| 2011 | William & Kate: The Movie | Prince Charles | Television film |
| 2011 | ICE | Stephan Archer | Miniseries |
| 2012 | Teenage Mutant Ninja Turtles | Dr. Mindstrong | Voice, 2 episodes |
| 2013–2014 | Banshee | Mr. Rabbit | Main cast, 14 episodes |
| 2014–2015 | Randy Cunningham: 9th Grade Ninja | The Sorcerer | Voice, Main cast, 14 episodes |
| 2015 | Viking Quest | King Orn | Television film |
| 2018 | 12 Monkeys | Nicodemus | 2 episodes |
| 2019 | Pandora | Harlan Fried | 4 episodes |
