= Operation Rimon 20 =

1970 aerial battle between Israel and the Soviet Union

Rimon 20
- Part of the War of Attrition
Date	July 30, 1970
Location	West of Suez Canal
Result	Israeli victory

Belligerents
Israel	Soviet Union

Commanders and leaders
Mordechai Hod; Iftach Spector; Amos Amir	Nikolai Yurchenko †

Strength
12 Mirage IIICs; 4 F-4E Phantom IIs	24 MiG-21MFs

Casualties and losses
1 aircraft damaged	4 killed 5 aircraft destroyed

Rimon 20 (Hebrew: רימון 20, Pomegranate 20) was the code name of an aerial battle in 1970 which pitted the Israeli Air Force directly against Soviet fighter pilots stationed in Egypt during the War of Attrition. Israel planned the dogfight in order to send a message that it would no longer tolerate direct Soviet military involvement in its conflict with Egypt.

In the afternoon of July 30, 1970, four Israeli Mirage IIIs crossed into Egyptian airspace, flying in tight formation so as to appear as a single aircraft. As expected, four Soviet-flown MiG-21s were scrambled to intercept what they believed to be a routine Israeli reconnaissance flight. They were soon joined by an additional eight MiGs. As the Soviet fighters closed in on the Mirages, they were ambushed by four Israeli F-4 Phantoms and eight Mirage IIIs that had been lurking undetected at low altitude. An additional 12 MiG-21 reinforcements soon arrived. By the end of the close-quarters dogfight, five Soviet MiG-21s had been downed with no Israeli losses.

Egyptian military leaders were pleased with the outcome of the battle because the Soviets had long been criticizing Egypt's aerial losses to Israel and attributing them to a lack of skill among Egyptian fighter pilots. The Soviets kept quiet about the incident so as to avoid the embarrassment of their defeat. It was one of the final engagements of the War of Attrition and is widely believed to have contributed to its conclusion.

== Background ==
=== Soviet intervention ===
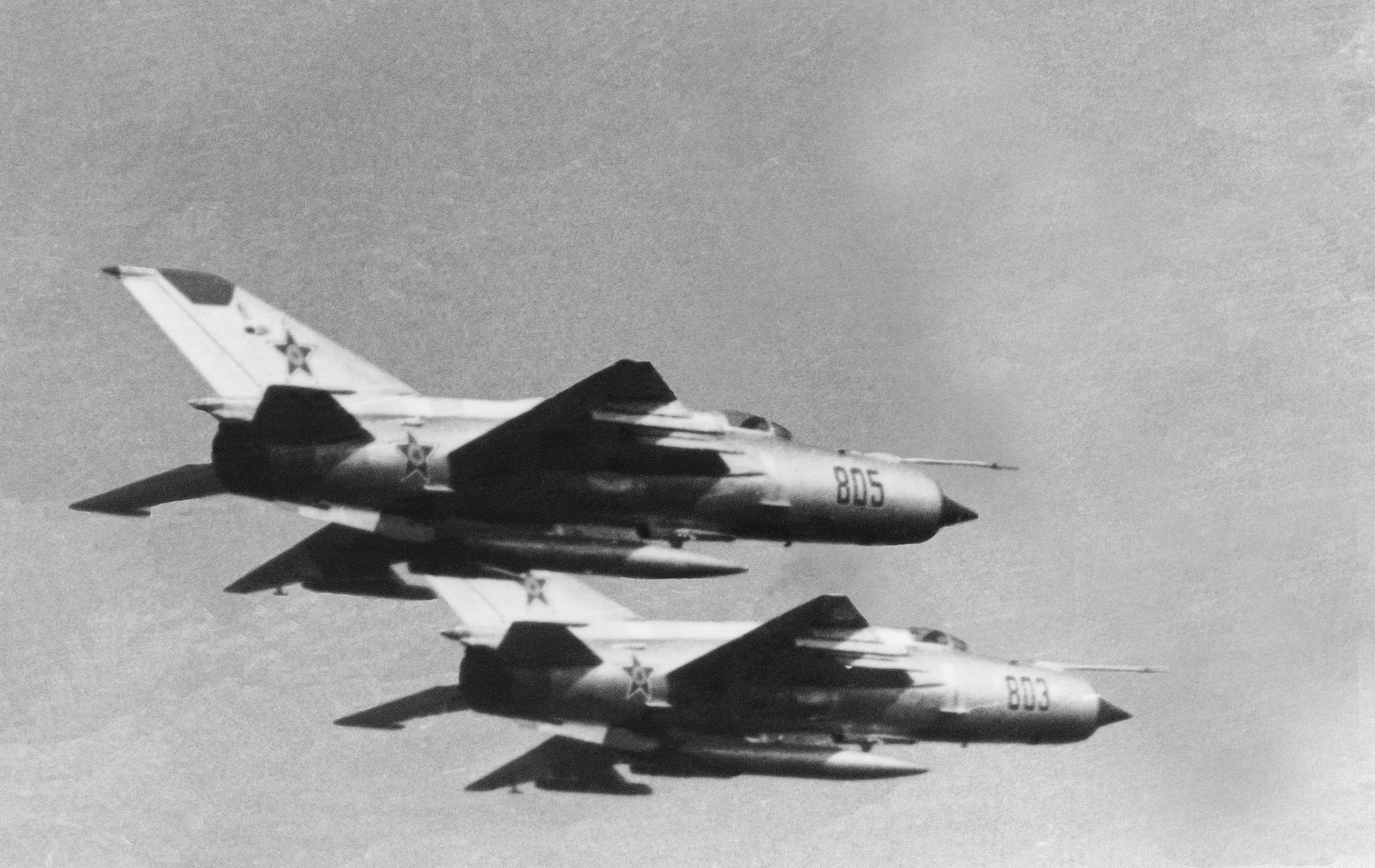
Romanian MiG-21MFs, the Soviet aircraft type deployed to Egypt.

Egypt had launched the War of Attrition in the hope of wearing down Israel's hold on territories captured during the 1967 Six-Day War. By the start of 1970, however, the Israeli Air Force had established complete aerial superiority over the front lines along the Suez Canal, and the launching of Operation Priha in January laid bare Egypt's inability to counter Israeli supremacy not only along the canal but in the Egyptian heartland as well. President Nasser of Egypt therefore turned to the Soviet Union for assistance. Nasser visited Moscow on January 24–25, 1970, and persuaded his hosts to expand Soviet assistance. An entire division of the Soviet Air Defence Forces (Voyska PVO), the 18th Special Anti-Aircraft Rocket Division, including the MiG-21MF-equipped 135th Fighter Aviation Regiment and the latest versions of the SA-2 and SA-3 SAM batteries, therefore deployed to Egypt. These were initially tasked with the defence of Cairo, Alexandria and the Aswan Dam alone, freeing Egyptian air defence assets to engage the IAF over the canal zone. Their presence and active participation in the defence of Egypt was not made public and denied long afterwards, yet picked up by Israeli intelligence not long after their arrival.

The Israeli government, fearful of confronting a superpower and the possible consequences, directed the IAF to keep its distance from the Soviet forces. Operation Priha was soon curtailed, and as the Soviets made their presence felt, terminated outright. By the end of April 1970 Israeli aircraft were no longer flying into Egypt, in the hope that this would satisfy the Soviets. The Soviets and Egyptians, however, now began rolling their combined air defence array towards the canal zone, threatening to deprive Israel of its aerial superiority. The Israeli air force targeted both the Egyptian SAM batteries and ancillary infrastructure, but by the end of June two F-4 Phantoms had fallen to SAMs and two more in July. Moreover, Soviet fighters were also expanding their sphere of operations and it was becoming apparent that the Soviets, bolstered by their success, were actively seeking an engagement. On July 25 Soviet MiG-21s intercepted Israeli A-4 Skyhawks on a ground attack mission and chased them into Israeli-controlled Sinai. One Skyhawk was hit by an AA-2 Atoll missile and forced to land at Rephidim.

=== Israeli change of heart ===
Both Israeli government and air force had by now realised that the policy of restraint versus the Soviets had failed. For the first time, Israel's hard-won aerial supremacy was under serious threat, not only on the west bank of the Suez Canal, but over Israeli-controlled territory as well. The Israeli Air Force therefore proposed to take the Soviets head-on, hoping to demonstrate that although it possessed no operational answer to the extensive air defence array forming on the west bank of the Suez Canal, it was nevertheless superior in the air. The opportunity to punish the Soviets would also serve to boost flagging morale following the loss of several aircraft and airmen in the previous few months, and would also prove valuable in upcoming ceasefire negotiations. IAF Commander Mordechai (Motti) Hod, backed by IDF Chief of the General Staff Haim Bar-Lev, took his case to the Israeli cabinet on July 25. Once the approval of Golda Meir's government had been received, the IAF then set about organizing a planned team ambush. Such ambushes had been carried out before, under the code name "Rimon" (Pomegranate), and an existing plan was now brought up to date and designated "Rimon 20". Initially planned for July 29, it was later pushed back to July 30.

== Prelude ==
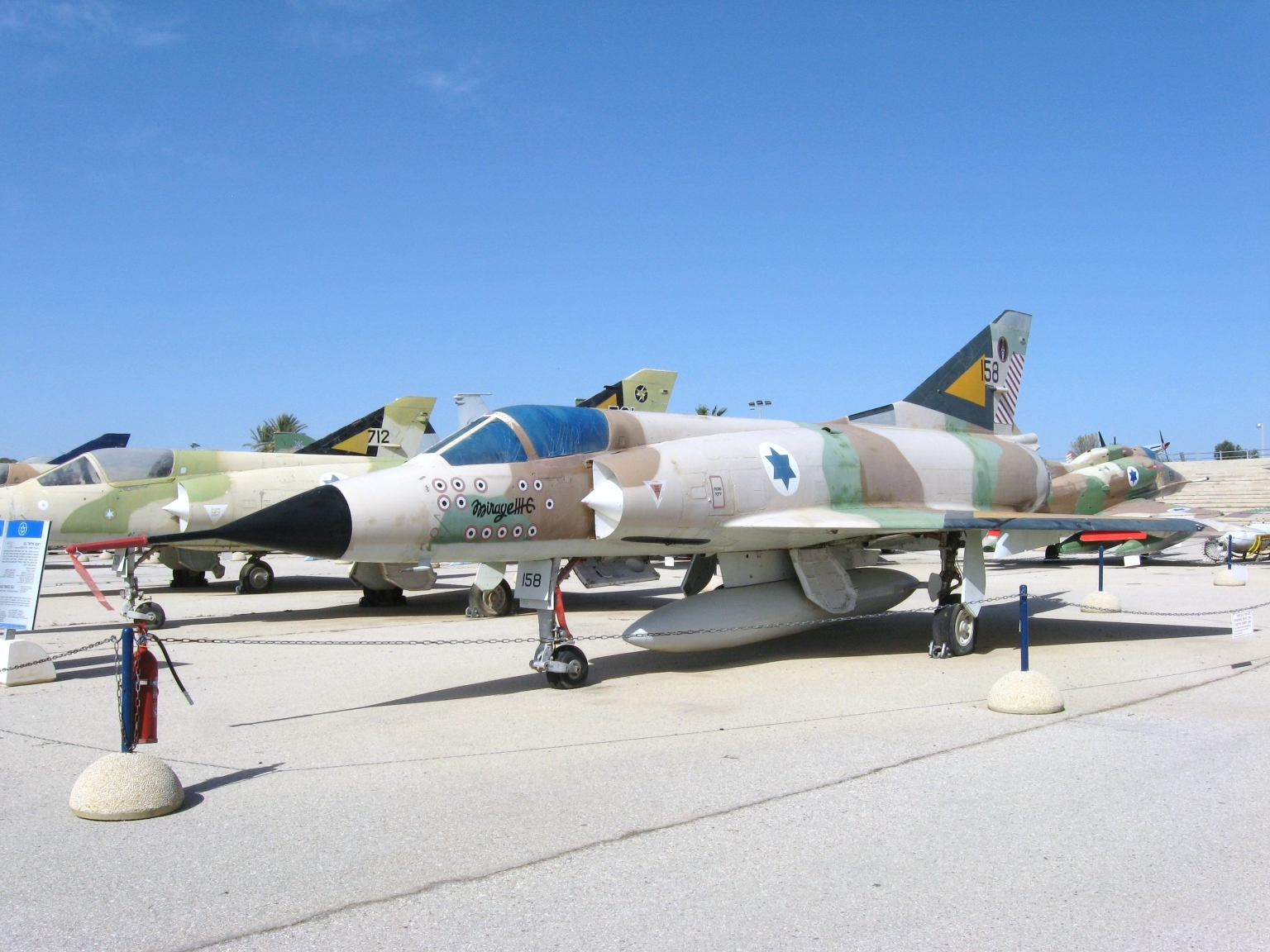
Israeli Air Force Mirage IIIC.

"Rimon 20" was to begin with an attack by IAF 69 Squadron F-4E Phantom IIs on an Egyptian radar station southeast of the city of Suez. These were to be carried out in an attack profile usually adopted by IAF Skyhawks, giving the impression of yet another day of battle on the Suez Canal front. Four 119 Squadron Dassault Mirages, meanwhile, were to penetrate Egyptian airspace in the far south near Hurghada, imitating a routine reconnaissance flight. Once Soviet MiGs were scrambled to intercept the Mirages, these were to draw the MiGs westward, at which point the Phantoms and four 117 Squadron Mirages on station over the Sinai were to close in on the MiGs from the east, springing the trap. A further four 101 Squadron Mirages were to be on immediate alert at Rephidim.

Leaving nothing to chance, Motti Hod decided to assemble the best possible squad for the mission. Airmen selection rested with the Squadron commanders and each subsequently selected himself. Amos Amir, commanding 119 Squadron and a 5-kills ace at the time, selected Asher Snir (11 kills), Avraham Salmon (6) and Avi Gilad (2) to accompany him. Uri Even-Nir, commanding 117 Squadron and already credited with 3 kills, was to be accompanied by Itamar Neuner (4), Yehuda Koren (7) and Kobi Richter (7). Iftach Spector, an 8-kills ace leading 101 Squadron, was accompanied by Michael Tzuk (2), Israel Baharav (5) and Giora Ram-Furman. The 69 Squadron Phantoms was led by Avihu Bin-Nun, who had shot down 2 aircraft as a Mirage pilot, with navigator Shaul Levi. Also present were Aviem Sella (1) with Reuven Reshef, Ehud Hankin (3, navigator unknown) and Uri Gil (1) with Israel Parnas. To face the Soviets, who had little combat experience and no kills to their name, the IAF was preparing to send up some of its most experienced pilots, with a combined score of 67 aerial kills.

== Battle ==
Thursday, July 30, 1970, began as yet another day in the ongoing War of Attrition with the IAF striking Egyptian positions along the Suez Canal. 69 and 201 Squadron Phantoms, 110 Squadron Vautours, 113 Squadron Ouragans and 115, 102, and 116 Squadron Skyhawks took part in the strikes, encountering no aerial opposition. Once all aircraft had returned to base, Rimon 20 could commence.

It began at 14:00 with Bin-Nun, Sela, Hankin and Gil striking the Egyptian radar post at Sokhna. Meanwhile, Amos Amir's four 119 Squadron Mirages were crossing the Gulf of Suez at low altitude, entering Egyptian airspace before turning north and ascending to 35,000 feet (11,000 m). Flying in tight formation to appear as a single or double target on a routine reconnaissance flight, the four Mirages were each armed with a pair of AIM-9D Sidewinders. It took 11 minutes but the Soviets eventually fell for the ruse and scrambled their fighters to intercept the Israeli aircraft. First off the ground was a MiG-21 quartet from Kawm Ushim led by Captain Kamenev, followed shortly later by two four-ship formations from Beni-Suef led by captains Yurchenko and Saranin. A MiG from the latter formation soon aborted the mission after encountering engine problems. Twelve more MiGs were later launched from Kawm Ushim and al-Qatamiyah (also known as Wadi Al Jandali, near Kafr Mas'ud). Two Soviet quartets were vectored to intercept the intruding "reconnaissance" flight, while another two were directed at what were thought to be Skyhawks on a ground attack mission.

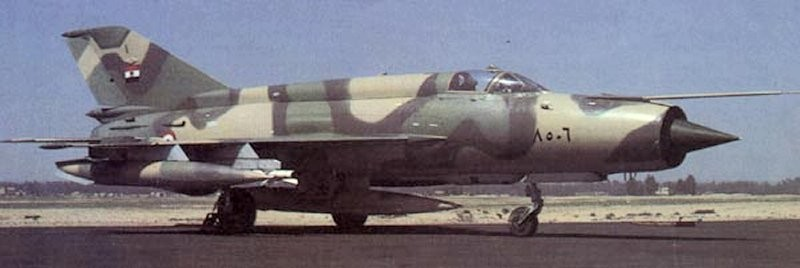
An Egyptian MiG-21RF. Soviet aircraft in Egypt carried Egyptian Air Force markings.

As the first MiGs were 20 km out and approaching from the west, Amos Amir led his four aircraft in a 270° climbing turn that brought them on a westerly heading. They had, however, turned too tightly. Instead of drawing the MiGs westward, they were now facing them head-on. As the Mirages were closing in on the MiGs, the four Phantoms were approaching the area at low altitude and at a line abreast. The original plan had called for the Phantoms to zip in from below, behind and beneath the MiG-21s pursuing the Mirages, and pick them off with their radar-guided AIM-7 Sparrows. This was now no longer possible and as the Phantoms entered the fray, a close-quarters dogfight commenced.

The Israelis were not only skillful, but lucky as well: one Russian pilot managed to get on the tail of a Phantom and hit it with an AA-2 Atoll heat-seeking missile, but it failed to explode.

=== The Mirages engage ===
While the Phantoms maintained mutually protective pairs, the less disciplined Mirage pilots broke apart to individually engage their opponents. Avraham Salmon and Avi Gilad separated as the battle began and Salmon was soon the first to score a kill. Spotting two MiGs on the tail of a pair of Phantoms, he warned his comrades of the approaching danger before leveling off behind the rear MiG and launching an AIM-9D. The MiG exploded, killing pilot Nikolai Yurchenko.

Asher Snir had also separated from his wingman to chase MiGs. Finding himself in the midst of a number of MiGs and Phantoms, he opted to chase one of the Soviet fighters. As the MiG was pulling away from the Mirage, Snir let off an AIM-9D which struck the MiG-21's underbelly. Captain Yevgeny Yakovlev managed to bail out of the stricken aircraft, yet died in the descent. Aviem Sella witnessed the downing:

One of the Mirages (flown by Asher Snir) fired an air-to-air missile seconds after the battle began. The missile hit a MiG and set it on fire. The pilot bailed out; the aircraft went into a spin and dropped like a stone from 30,000 ft [9,100 m]. The Russian pilot's parachute opened right away – it's not supposed to: chutes are designed to open automatically at 10,000 ft. [3,000 m], so their wearers don't freeze or suffocate at high altitudes.

Snir, however, in the heat of pursuit and without the protection of a wingman, had failed to spot a MiG-21 closing in on his tail. Captain Vladimir Ivlev fired an AA-2 Atoll at the Mirage, which exploded in the exhaust of the Atar engine, shredding the nozzle and tail of Snir's aircraft. Snir disengaged and managed to nurse his damaged aircraft to a safe landing in Rephidim. Ivlev, short on fuel, let off an unsuccessful cannon burst at one of the Phantoms before heading back to al-Qatamiyah.

With the battle underway, Israeli reinforcements were ordered into the fight. The four 117 Squadron Mirages which had been lurking at low altitude over the Sinai, beyond the reach of Egyptian and Soviet radar, were pulling up and proceeding westward when Itamar Neuner's jet suffered an engine malfunction and had to abort the mission. Wary of leaving Neuner alone in hostile territory, Even-Nir escorted his wingman back to Rephidim. A 101 Squadron pair, Iftach Spector and Michael Tzuk, were scrambled to replace them. Spector, however, soon lost sight of Tzuk and ordered him to return to base, proceeding into the battle by himself. The remaining 117 pair, Koren and Richter, were also about to engage the Soviet fighters.

=== Phantom kills ===
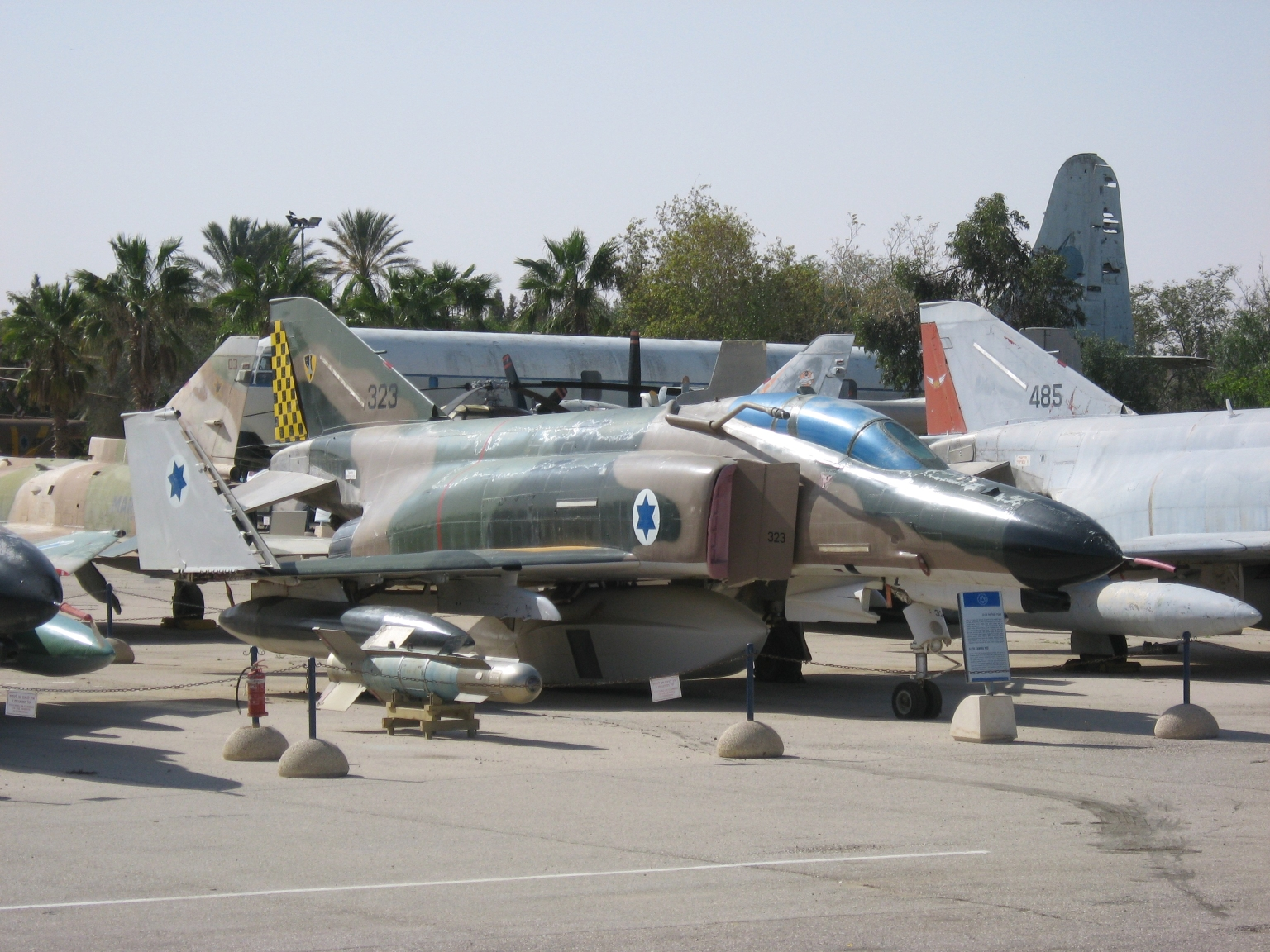
Israeli Air Force 69 Squadron F-4E Phantom II.

The Phantoms crews, meanwhile, were finding out that flying in pairs was indeed safer, yet not as conducive towards scoring aerial kills since it limited individual pilot freedom of action. Their Soviet adversaries did not seem skilled enough to pose a serious threat and Bin-Nun and Sella decided to part ways and go after their own quarries. Sella set his sights on one of the MiGs yet failed to get into position to fire his missiles. When the MiG performed a tight turn and came face to face with the Phantom, Sella himself performed a tight Immelman turn which placed him above and behind the MiG:

By this time I'd realized the Russian pilot was inexperienced; he didn't know how to handle his aircraft in a combat situation. At 15,000 ft [4,600 m] he proved this fact by trying to escape in a steep dive to 700 ft [210 m]. All we had to do was follow him and lock our radar onto him – and fire a missile. There was a tremendous explosion – but the MiG came out of the cloud of smoke apparently unharmed. That made me mad and I fired a second missile – which turned out to be unnecessary. The Russian aircraft had, in fact, been severely damaged by the first missile; suddenly, it burst into flames and fell apart. By the time the second missile reached it, it wasn't there any more.

Sella's AIM-9 had downed Captain Georgy Syrkin, who successfully bailed out of his aircraft.

Two minutes had passed by now and both Mirages and MiG-21s were low on fuel and starting to depart the combat zone. Avihu Bin-Nun spotted one such MiG flying at 1,000–2,000 feet (300–610 m) with 117 Squadron's Koren and Richter on his tail. Richter had launched a Shafrir 2 missile at the MiG, yet the distance was too great and the missile fell harmlessly to the ground. Koren also attempted a missile launch, only to discover that he had jettisoned his missiles along with his fuel tanks when he entered the battle. Koren was closing into cannon range when an AIM-7 Sparrow passed him by. It struck its target, disintegrating it to bits and killing pilot Kamenev. The missile had been launched by Avihu Bin-Nun and Shaul Levi:

Suddenly we found ourselves, me and my number 2, along with a lone 117 Squadron jet, pursuing a MiG flying at low level and almost at the speed of sound. As we saw it, the biggest threat was that the 117 pilot would claim our MiG. We launched a "Sparrow", though one shouldn't at that altitude and in those conditions. Just so that 117 wouldn't get him.

=== Shared kill ===
Another MiG-21 trying to make its way away from the battle zone was being chased by Avraham Salmon. Having spotted Salmon on his tail, Vladimir Zhuravlev was maneuvering hard to deny Salmon the opportunity to shoot him down. Salmon had already fired a missile that failed to cause any damage, when Spector's 101 Squadron Mirage joined the fight and fired another pair at the MiG. Although at least one struck home, these too failed to bring the aircraft down, and it continued to fly away to the northwest. Salmon continued to give chase to the vicinity of Helwan, where he managed to close the distance to the MiG and emptied his cannon into the aircraft. With both his ammunition and fuel exhausted, he departed the scene. Only years later (see below) was it revealed that Zhuravlev's aircraft had in fact crashed and its pilot killed. Spector and Salmon were both credited with a shared kill, the fifth and last of the battle.

The engagement had lasted a little less than three minutes. As the Soviets could yet scramble more aircraft to the scene, Motti Hod gave the order for all remaining aircraft to disengage and withdraw. While the Mirages headed to Rephidim to refuel prior to their return to their home bases in Israel proper, the 69 Squadron Phantoms made their way directly to Ramat David.

== Aftermath ==
First details of the encounter appeared in the international press within hours of the event. Israel had claimed the downing of 4 Egyptian aircraft, not disclosing the true identity of the participants, while Egypt denied losing any aircraft. More details, however, soon became available. The true identity of the MiG pilots was reported within days, and confirmed by Prime Minister Meir in late October 1970 when discussing the Soviet presence in Egypt:

How do I know there are Russian pilots in Egypt? Very simply because we had shot down four Soviet planes that were flown by Soviet pilots.

In 1972 the Egyptian press disclosed that 5 Soviet aircraft had in fact been lost on July 30, 1970. This was later also confirmed by President Anwar Sadat of Egypt during his visit to Israel prior to the signing of the Camp David Accords.

The Soviet Union deployed another regiment of MiG-21s and a squadron of Su-15 all-weather interceptors were sent to Egypt to bolster defences. They also prepared their own counter-ambush a few days later. Dummy missile batteries were set up to lure Israeli fighter jets in while the real missiles were concealed. The Israelis took the bait. One Israeli F-4 Phantom was shot down and another was hit but managed to return to base.

The Egyptians themselves reacted with ill-concealed delight at the outcome of the engagement. They had previously suffered intense criticism of their own performance and boasts of superior Soviet skills, when in fact the Soviets had fallen for tactics the Egyptians were already familiar with.

While a morale boosting achievement for Israel, Rimon 20 did not change the course of the war. Another IAF F-4 Phantom was lost to an SA-3 on August 3 and another damaged. The new level of escalation, however, proved too ominous for all involved. Neither Israel nor Egypt could secure a clear advantage, yet both could claim military achievements. American pressure to end a conflict with the potential to draw in both the United States and the USSR soon bore fruit. On August 7, 1970, a ceasefire agreement came into effect, ending the War of Attrition.

== Order of battle ==
=== Israeli ===
Name	Squadron	Aircraft	Serial number	
Amos Amir	119	Mirage IIIC		Squadron CO.
Asher Snir	119	Mirage IIIC	6x	Squadron junior deputy CO. 1 kill, damaged by the Soviet pilot Vladimir Ivlev.
Avraham Salmon	119	Mirage IIIC	78	Squadron senior deputy CO. 1.5 kills.
Avi Gilad	119	Mirage IIIC		
Uri Even-Nir	117	Mirage IIIC		Squadron CO. Aborted before battle, Neuner escort.
Itamar Neuner	117	Mirage IIIC		Engine problem, aborted before battle.
Yehuda Koren	117	Mirage IIIC		
Kobi Richter	117	Mirage IIIC		
Iftach Spector	101	Mirage IIIC	52	Squadron CO. Rephidim standby, scrambled to replace Even-Nir and Neuner. 0.5 kill.
Michael Tzuk	101	Mirage IIIC		Squadron junior deputy CO. Rephidim standby, scrambled to replace Aven-Nir and Neuner, aborted before battle.
Israel Baharav	101	Mirage IIIC		Rephidim standby, did not participate.
Giora Ram-Furman	101	Mirage IIIC		Rephidim standby, did not participate.
Avihu Bin-Nun/Shaul Levi	69	F-4E Phantom II	105	Squadron CO. 1 kill.
Aviem Sella/Reuven Reshef	69	F-4E Phantom II	183	Squadron deputy CO. 1 kill.
Ehud Hankin/	69	F-4E Phantom II		
Uri Gil/Israel Parnas	69	F-4E Phantom II		

=== Soviet ===
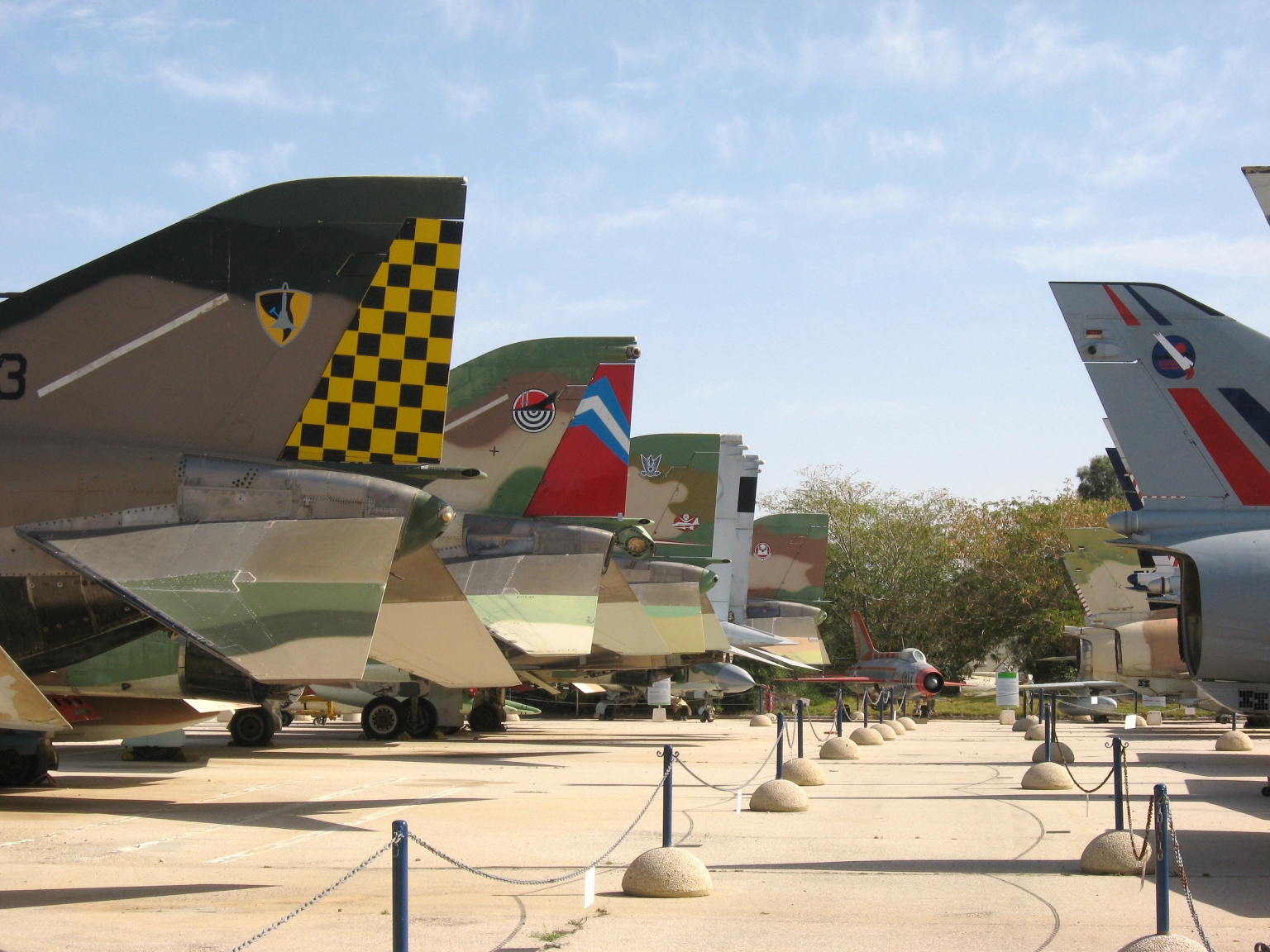
A MiG-21 stands at the end of a row of Phantoms in the Israeli Air Force Museum.

Name	Base	Aircraft	Status
Nikolai P. Yurchenko	Beni Suef	MiG-21MF	Squadron CO, KIA. born 1937
Pavel F. Makara	Beni Suef	MiG-21MF	damaged
Yevgenniy G. Yakovlev	Beni Suef	MiG-21MF	Ejected, KIA. born 1935
Georgiy A. Syrkin	Beni Suef	MiG-21MF	Ejected.
Vitaliy F. Saranin	Beni Suef	MiG-21MF	
Vladimir F. Vasiliev	Beni Suef	MiG-21MF	
Sergiey W. Mazur	Beni Suef	MiG-21MF	
V. Suprun	Beni Suef	MiG-21MF	
Yevgenniy A. Kamenev	Kom Ashwin	MiG-21MF	Squadron CO, KIA.
?	Kom Ashwin	MiG-21MF	
?	Kom Ashwin	MiG-21MF	
Vladimir A. Zhuravlev	Kom Ashwin	MiG-21MF	Ejected (?), KIA. born 1932
	al-Qutamiya	MiG-21MF	
Vladimir Ivlev	al-Qutamiya	MiG-21MF	Damaged Asher Snir's Mirage.
	al-Qutamiya	MiG-21MF	
	al-Qutamiya	MiG-21MF	
Two more quartets, one from Kom Ashwin and another from Kom Ashwin or al-Qutamiya, were also scrambled.

== See also ==
- Operation Bolo
