= Steal the Sky =

- Film poster
- Genre: Action; Romance; War
- Written by: Christopher Wood; Dorothy Tristan
- Directed by: John D. Hancock
- Starring: Mariel Hemingway; Ben Cross; Sasson Gabai
- Music by: Yanni
- Country of origin: United States
- Original language: English

Production
- Producer: Yoram Ben-Ami
- Production location: Reno, Nevada
- Cinematography: Misha Suslov
- Editors: Dennis M. O'Connor; Jon Poll
- Running time: 105 min
- Production company: HBO Pictures

Original release
- Network: HBO
- Release: August 28, 1988

Steal the Sky is a 1988 HBO movie directed by John D. Hancock and starring Mariel Hemingway and Ben Cross. The film is based on the true story of an Iraqi Assyrian fighter pilot Munir Redfa, who defected by flying a MiG-21 fighter jet to Israel in 1966. Steal the Sky was the first production under the HBO-Paramount co-financing agreement launched in 1987.

The 1986 story of a female agent of the Israeli Mossad involved in the defection of an Iraqi Israeli nuclear scientist may have also been instrumental in gaining attention for the film. The soundtrack was composed and performed by Greek new-age artist Yanni.

== Plot ==
American-born Israeli spy Helen Mason (Mariel Hemingway) is sent to Iraq to coerce an Iraqi pilot into hijacking a Soviet-made fighter jet for Israeli defense research. She seduces Munir Redfa (Ben Cross) in order to blackmail him. There are unexpected results when Helen finds herself falling in love with him, endangering the mission, while he is torn between his love for her and his loyalty to Iraq.

== Cast ==
- Mariel Hemingway as Helen Mason
- Ben Cross as Munir Redfa
- Sasson Gabai as Kamel Djern
- Etti Ankri as Fara
- Nicolas Surovy as David Mason
- Ronald Guttman as Mohammed Khader
- Mark Rolston as Colonel Bukharine
- Sam Gray as General Curt
- Andreas Katsulas as Colonel Gemayel
- Michael Shillo as General Tal
- Tamara Triffez as Chantal
- Reuven Bar Yotam as Dr. Taupe
- Ronald Guttman as Mohammed Khader
- Yossi Shiloa as Aziz
- Faim Saadi as Anwar
- Maria Cavaiana as Nadi
- Ilhan Zehavi as Marcel
- Tikva Aziz as Lila
- Victor Ken as Yusef
- Uri Gavriel as Akmed
- Ted Kasanov as President Abdul Salam Arif
- Rikva Bachar as Servant
- Motti Levy as Ticket Collector
- Gabi Amrani as Gas Station Owner
- Chaim Banai as Van Driver
- Ilan Kernerman as Waiter
- Abir Haddad as Stewardess
- Elvira de Masi as Singer In Restaurant
- Naffi Salach as Kurd Leader
- Yoram Ben-Ami as Mossad Agent

== Production ==
Steal the Sky was filmed on location in Israel, Rome and Reno, Nevada. The story of Captain Munir Redfa inspired the film, but some aspects of his exploit were not revealed. In one of the Mossad's most significant operations, it was able to smuggle Redfa's entire extended family safely out of Iraq to Israel. Mossad did not have any involvement with Redfa's initial defection.

His MiG-21F-13 fighter was evaluated by the Israeli Air Force and was later loaned to the United States for testing and intelligence analysis. Knowledge obtained from analysis of the aircraft was instrumental to the successes achieved by the Israeli Air Force in its future encounters with Arab MiG-21s.

The aircraft used in the film were three MiG-15/15UTIs (actually ex-Polish SBLim-2s), three T-33s and a Bell Jet Ranger.

== Reception ==
In a 1988 review for the Los Angeles Times, Howard Rosenberg wrote, "Oh, it's watchable enough. But it's a spy/adventure story that lacks suspense, a love story whose lovers lack intensity, a Middle Eastern story ... that lacks historical and political definition." He concludes, "It's love, adventure – and schmaltz – the Middle East."

Film historian and critic Leonard Maltin wrote in Leonard Maltin's Movie Guide that it was a "pretentious, melodramatic misfire."

== Honors ==
At the 1989 Primetime Emmy Awards, Steal the Sky was nominated for Outstanding Sound Editing for a Miniseries or a Special. Additionally, Ben Cross was nominated as Best Actor in a Movie or Miniseries, while Steal the Sky was nominated for Editing and Direction of Photography for a Dramatic Special or Series/Theatrical Special/Movie or Miniseries in the 1989 CableACE Awards.

== See also ==
- Operation Diamond
