= Operation Synytsia =

Ukrainian military intelligence operation

Coordinates: 49.55783°N 37.25581°E

- Operational scope: Facilitating defection of Maxim Kuzminov
- Planned by: Main Directorate of Intelligence
- Objective: Obtaining equipment and spare parts for Sukhoi Su-27, Su-30SM, Su-35
- Date: 9 August 2023
- Outcome: Successful defection of Kuzminov, death of the remaining helicopter crew

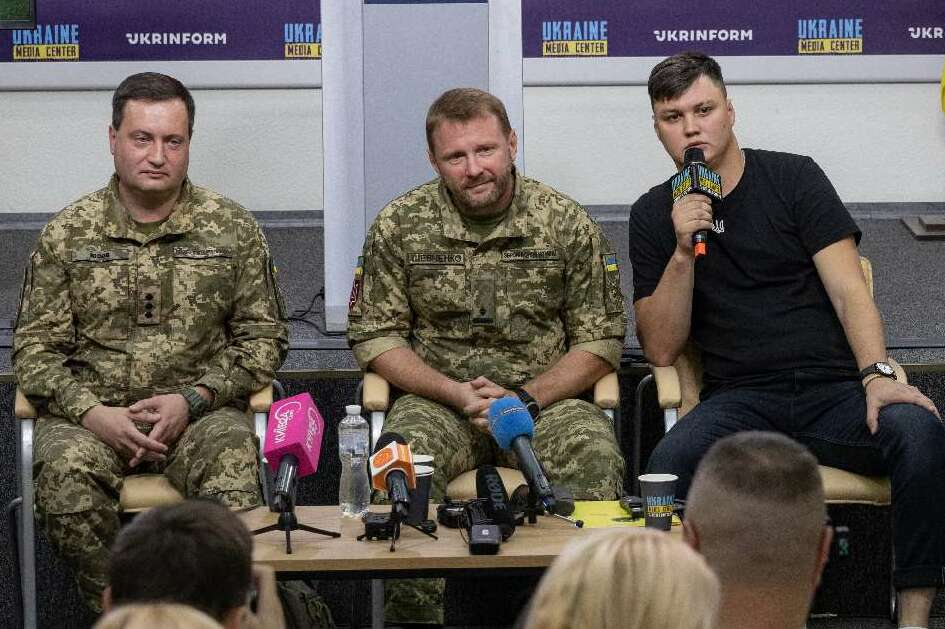
Kuzminov (right) with Ukrainian military intelligence officers in September 2023

Operation Synytsia (Ukrainian: Операція «Синиця», romanized: Operatsiia "Synytsia", lit. 'tit') was an operation conducted by Ukraine's Main Directorate of Intelligence to facilitate the defection of Russian Mi-8 helicopter pilot Maxim Kuzminov (Russian: Максим Кузьминов). After previously arranging his defection and the simultaneous escape of his family, on 9 August 2023, Kuzminov turned off radio communications and landed near Poltava, Kharkiv Oblast, where Ukrainian forces received him and killed the other crew members.

On 5 September 2023, Ukrainian intelligence representative Andriy Yusov announced that Maxim Kuzminov would receive a reward of $500,000 paid in the Ukrainian hryvnia. Yusov additionally promised that Kuzminov and his family would receive unspecified security guarantees, as well as eventual Ukrainian citizenship.

On 13 February 2024, Kuzminov was found dead with bullet wounds in Villajoyosa, Spain.

== Background ==
Maxim Kuzminov (19 June 1995 – February 2024), born in Arsenyev, was a graduate of the Syzran Higher Military Aviation School of Pilots. During the Russian invasion of Ukraine, he served in the Russian Armed Forces as a pilot-navigator in the 319th Separate Helicopter Regiment, part of the 11th Army of the Air Force and Air Defense of the Eastern Military District. Kuzminov was not part of the initial invasion force, remaining with his unit in the Amur region. During this time, he "started leafing through textbooks and watching bloggers" to learn more about Russian-Ukrainian relations and the Russo-Ukrainian War which had been ongoing since 2014.

His studies led him to sympathize with Ukraine. However, he was still contracted as a pilot, and in October 2022 was deployed to the occupied territories of Ukraine – first to Mariupol, and then to Berdiansk. As the Mi-8 is a transport helicopter, he did not participate in any combat actions. Kuzminov wanted to resign his commission, but was unable to, stating that pilots who wanted to resign were threatened with being sent to the front as infantrymen.

== Operation ==
In early 2023, Kuzminov established contact with Ukrainian intelligence, and formulated an escape plan.

I contacted Ukrainian intelligence representatives. I explained my situation to them. To which they offered me this option: let us guarantee your safety, new documents, monetary compensation. We discussed all these details and started planning my flight.

The operation lasted more than six months and culminated with the flight on 9 August 2023. On this day, Kuzminov was transporting equipment and spare parts for the Sukhoi Su-27, Su-30SM and Su-35 Russian fighter aircraft. Kuzminov decided to make his move at this time due to the flight plan's proximity to Ukrainian territory, and the valuable cargo he was carrying. His intentions were quickly realized, and shortly before crossing the border, he started receiving small arms fire from Russian infantry:

I didn't just steal a helicopter, I officially flew it from point A to point B along a prearranged route. On 9 August at 16:30, it took off from the Kursk airfield to the Kharkiv region – approximately 20 kilometers from the border. Further, in the area of the settlement of Shebekino, I flew at an extremely low altitude of 5–10 meters in radio silence mode. When crossing the border they started firing at me. I can't say for sure who led it, but I assume it was the Russian side. I was wounded in the leg by small arms fire. Then I flew about 20 kilometers away and landed at the indicated location.

Accompanying Kuzminov were an onboard technician and a navigator, who were not aware of his plan to defect. Kuzminov later explained that although the crew began to get nervous and behave aggressively, they could not stop him, since Kuzminov was the only one who knew how to fly and land the helicopter. Kuzminov tried unsuccessfully to convince them to surrender.

The head of the Main Intelligence Directorate of Ukraine, Kyrylo Budanov, said the other crew members tried to escape when the helicopter landed, but were spotted and killed by Ukrainian soldiers. On the other hand, Russian sources said that the positions of the gunshot wounds showed that both of the other crew members where shot from close range, suggesting they were already killed by Kuzminov before the helicopter landed. Ukrainian intelligence representative Andriy Yusov said that in addition to the helicopter, which was manufactured in 2016, and the cargo of fighter jet parts, the Ukrainian Armed Forces received "invaluable information" about Russian aviation which could be used to enhance Ukrainian air defense systems.

== Coverage ==
On 23 August, two weeks after the incident, the Russian Ministry of Defense-affiliated Telegram channel Fighterbomber reported that a pilot had "gotten lost" and landed in Ukrainian territory for unknown reasons. Several hours later Kyrylo Budanov confirmed that the pilot had defected to Ukraine.

On 4 September, the Ukrainian Main Intelligence Directorate released a documentary film titled Down Russian Pilots, in which more details of the operation were revealed, including the identity of the pilot. The film compared the operation with Operation Diamond (Penicillin), which was carried out by the Israeli Mossad in 1966, convincing an Iraqi pilot to steal a MiG-21, then the most modern aircraft in the Soviet arsenal.

Kyrylo Budanov said that the operation represents "the first successful one in the entire history of Ukraine".

No one has done this during this time. We hope that we will be able to scale up now, said the Head of GUR. We were able to find the right approach to the pilot, move his entire family [out of Russia] unnoticed, and finally create conditions where he was able to move this aircraft with the crew without them knowing what was going on. After they realized where they landed, they tried to run away. Unfortunately, they were killed. It would be better if we could [capture] them alive, but it is what it is.

== Aftermath ==
In September, after lengthy negotiations, Russia managed to obtain the bodies of the crew members killed as a result of Kuzminov's actions. Both crew members, Khushbakht Tursunov and Nikita Kiryanov, received posthumous Orders of Courage.

In February 2024, a man's body, which was found in an underground parking garage in Villajoyosa, Province of Alicante, Spain "riddled with bullet holes and run over by a car", was confirmed to be Kuzminov. Western analysts considered it likely that he was assassinated by the Russian SVR. At the time of his death, Kuzminov was living under the assumed identity Igor Shevchenko. The newspaper El País reported that the Spanish authorities had provided Kuzminov with forged documents, but did not provide guarantees of protection. Spanish authorities believe that Kuzminov was exposed when he made a call to an ex-girlfriend inviting her to Alicante, a favourite with Russians and Ukrainians who have made their homes on the Costa Blanca. In December 2025, a Spanish court indefinitely suspended the investigation into Kuzminov's death, citing a lack of suspects.

== See also ==
- Suspicious Russia-related deaths since 2022
