= Israeli Air Force Museum =

Military aviation museum in Israel

Coordinates: 31.238343°N 34.696026°E

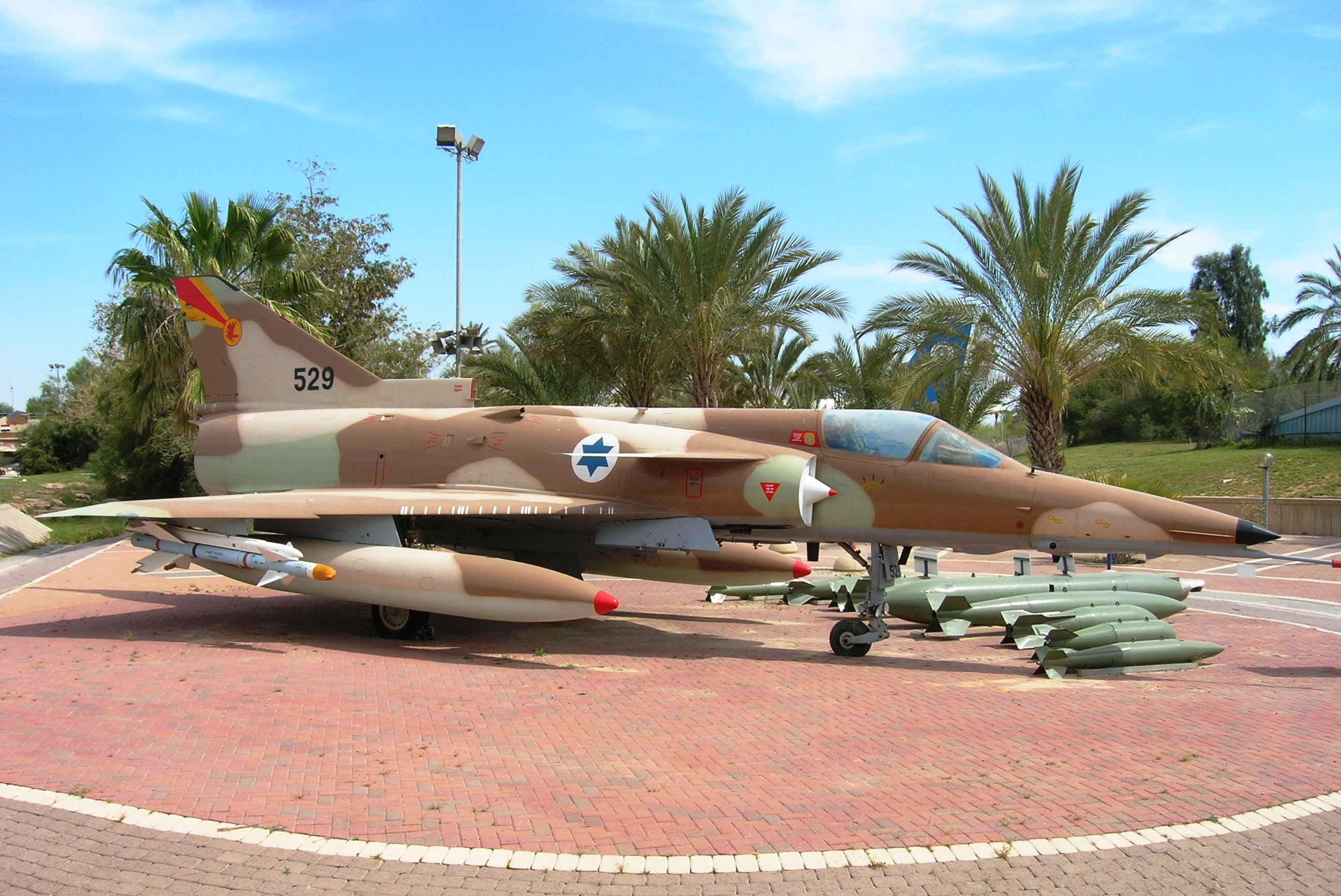
- IAI Kfir on display at the museum
- Established: 1977
- Location: Hatzerim Airbase, Negev desert, Israel
- Type: Aviation museum

The Israeli Air Force Museum is located next to Hatzerim Airbase in the Negev desert in Israel.

The museum was established in 1977 and has been open to the public since 1991. The museum displays a variety of Israeli Air Force and foreign aircraft, as well as anti aircraft arms. Soldiers from the Israeli Air Force serve as the museum staff.

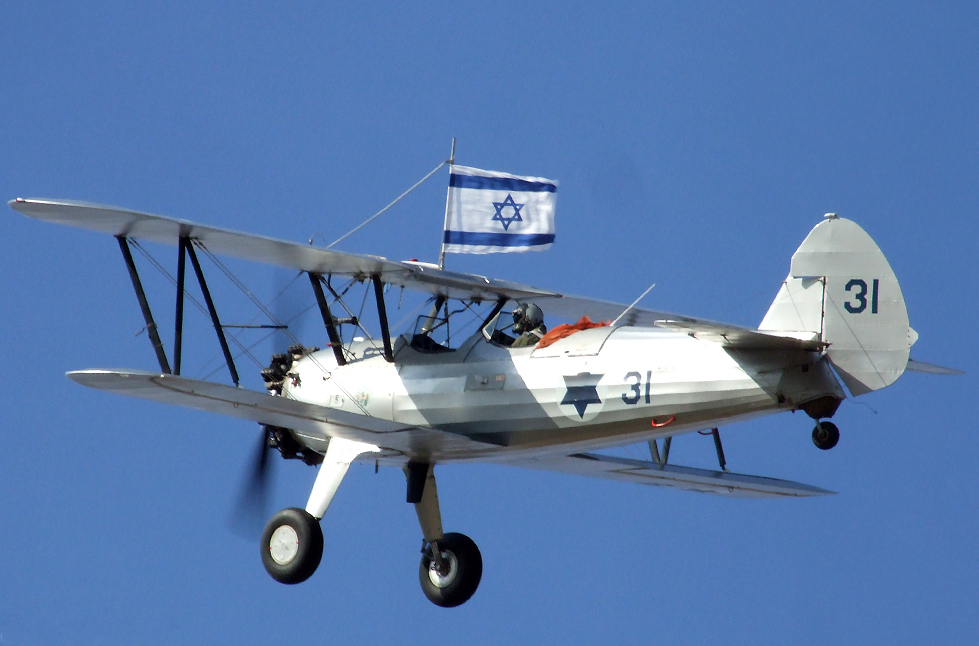
Boeing Stearman of the Israeli Air Force Museum, March 2007. It was destroyed in a ground fire in 2015

== Exhibits ==
The museum houses hundreds of models of fighter aircraft that served in the Israeli Air Force as well as actual fighter jets that have been retired from service or captured by Israel. Some of these aircraft, such as the Supermarine Spitfire "Black Spit" of Ezer Weizman and the yellow Harvard aircraft, are maintained in flying condition and even participate in various air shows. The museum includes historic aircraft such as the Mirage 3 Shahak 159 with 13 kills, the Mikoyan-Gurevich MiG-21 that was smuggled from Iraq in Operation Diamond, the Lavi built by Israel Aerospace Industries, an F-15 Baz with 4 kills, and an F-16 Netz 107 with 6.5 kills. There is also an exhibit of fighter jet parts explaining their uses, an anti-aircraft weapons display, a photography exhibition, and an exhibition titled "Pull to Life" about the 669 Tactical Airborne Rescue and Evacuation Unit.

During Passover and Independence Day, the Air Force displays active aircraft at the museum, such as the F-15I Ra'am, F-16I Sufa, and Boeing AH-64 Apache, and presents special flyovers and activities for children.

== History ==
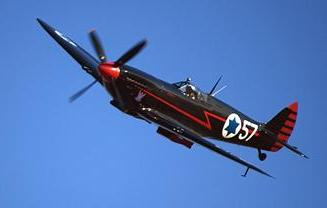
The Black Spitfire

The cornerstone for the museum was laid on July 16, 1985, mainly due to the efforts of Brigadier General (Res.) Yaakov Turner. The museum was opened to the public on June 20, 1991.

In February 2015, the silver Boeing-Stearman aircraft was completely destroyed due to poor maintenance. The aircraft had been in flying condition and participated in air shows for years, often flown by Yaakov Turner.

On November 6, 2016, the Ministry of Defense's Engineering and Construction Department and the Air Force announced an architecture competition to design the new Air Force Museum in Hatzerim, which, according to the Ministry of Defense, "will serve as a heritage center for the Air Force and a showcase for the Israeli aviation world." The competition was won by the Haifa-based architecture firm "Schwartz Besnosoff."

In February 2022, it was decided to scrap 20 aircraft that were on display at the museum, including the Boeing 707 that served as a flying command post during Operation Entebbe.

== Aircraft on display ==
=== Israeli air force aircraft ===
- Aérospatiale Alouette II
- Aérospatiale SA 321 Super Frelon
- Aerospatiale Super Frelon
- Agusta / Bell UH-1 – No. 002
- Agusta / Bell UH-1 – No. 026
- Avia S-199
- Beechcraft Queen Air
- Bell AH-1G Cobra
- Bell AH-1 Cobra
- Bell 206
- Boeing KC-97 Stratofreighter – No. 039 Masada
- Boeing KC-97 Stratofreighter
- Boeing 707 – Operation Thunderbolt flying command post
- Boeing 707 – radar testbed
- Boeing-Stearman Kaydet – maintained in airworthy condition
- Britten-Norman Islander
- Cessna 172
- Consolidated PBY Catalina
- Dassault Mirage III – No. 158
- Dassault Mirage III – No. 159, Re-acquired from Argentina
- Dassault Mystère IV
- Dassault Mystère IV – No. 60
- Dassault Ouragan – No. 49
- Dassault Ouragan – No. 80
- Dassault Super Mystère
- de Havilland Dragon Rapide
- de Havilland Tiger Moth
- Dornier Do 27
- Dornier Do 28
- Douglas DC-3 – No. 038
- Fokker S-11
- Fouga Magister
- Fouga Magister – IAI Tzukit variant
- General Dynamics F-16 Fighting Falcon – #107 with 6.5 kill markings
- Gloster Meteor – No. 06
- Gloster Meteor – Gate guard
- Gloster Meteor – NF-13 Variant
- Gloster Meteor – NF-13 Variant
- Gloster Meteor – No. 15
- Gloster Meteor – No. 18
- Grumman E-2C – No. 944
- Hughes 500
- IAI Arava – No. 203
- IAI Kfir – No. 712
- IAI Kfir TC – No. 988, modified Mirage IIIB
- IAI Kfir – No. 529, gate guard
- IAI Kfir – No. 451 Prism reconnaissance variant
- IAI Kfir – No. 310, TC-2 variant
- IAI Lavi
- IAI Nesher
- IAI Westwind – modified testbed aircraft
- McDonnell Douglas A-4 Skyhawk
- McDonnell Douglas F-15 Eagle
- McDonnell Douglas F-4 Phantom II – No. 323
- McDonnell Douglas F-4 Phantom II – transparent panels display aircraft interior
- McDonnell Douglas F-4 Phantom II – No. 498, F-4E(S) reconnaissance aircraft
- McDonnell Douglas F-4 Phantom II – Kurnass 2000 No. 614
- McDonnell Douglas F-4 Phantom II – No. 229 Super Phantom
- McDonnell Douglas F-4 Phantom II – No. 297, Manat test aircraft
- McDonnell Douglas RF-4E Phantom II – No. 485
- North American Harvard – No. 14
- North American Harvard – No. 001, maintained in airworthy condition
- North American P-51D Mustang
- North American P-51D Mustang
- Nord Noratlas – No. 045, 4X-FAE
- Pilatus PC-6
- Piper PA-18 Super Cub
- Republic RC-3 Seabee
- Sikorsky CH-53 – No. 471
- Sikorsky S-55 – No. 03
- Sikorsky S-58 – No. 07
- SOCATA Trinidad
- Sud-Ouest Vautour – No. 09 Hamashhit (Defiler)
- Sud-Ouest Vautour – No. 33 Big Brother
- Sud-Ouest Vautour – No. 70 Phantomas
- Supermarine Spitfire – LF Mk.IXe TE554, The Black Spitfire, former Israeli Air Force 20–57, maintained in airworthy condition
- Supermarine Spitfire – LF Mk.IXe SL653, former Israeli Air Force 20–28
- Supermarine Spitfire – F Mk.IXe EN145, former Israeli Air Force 20–78
- Taylorcraft Auster

=== Foreign Types ===
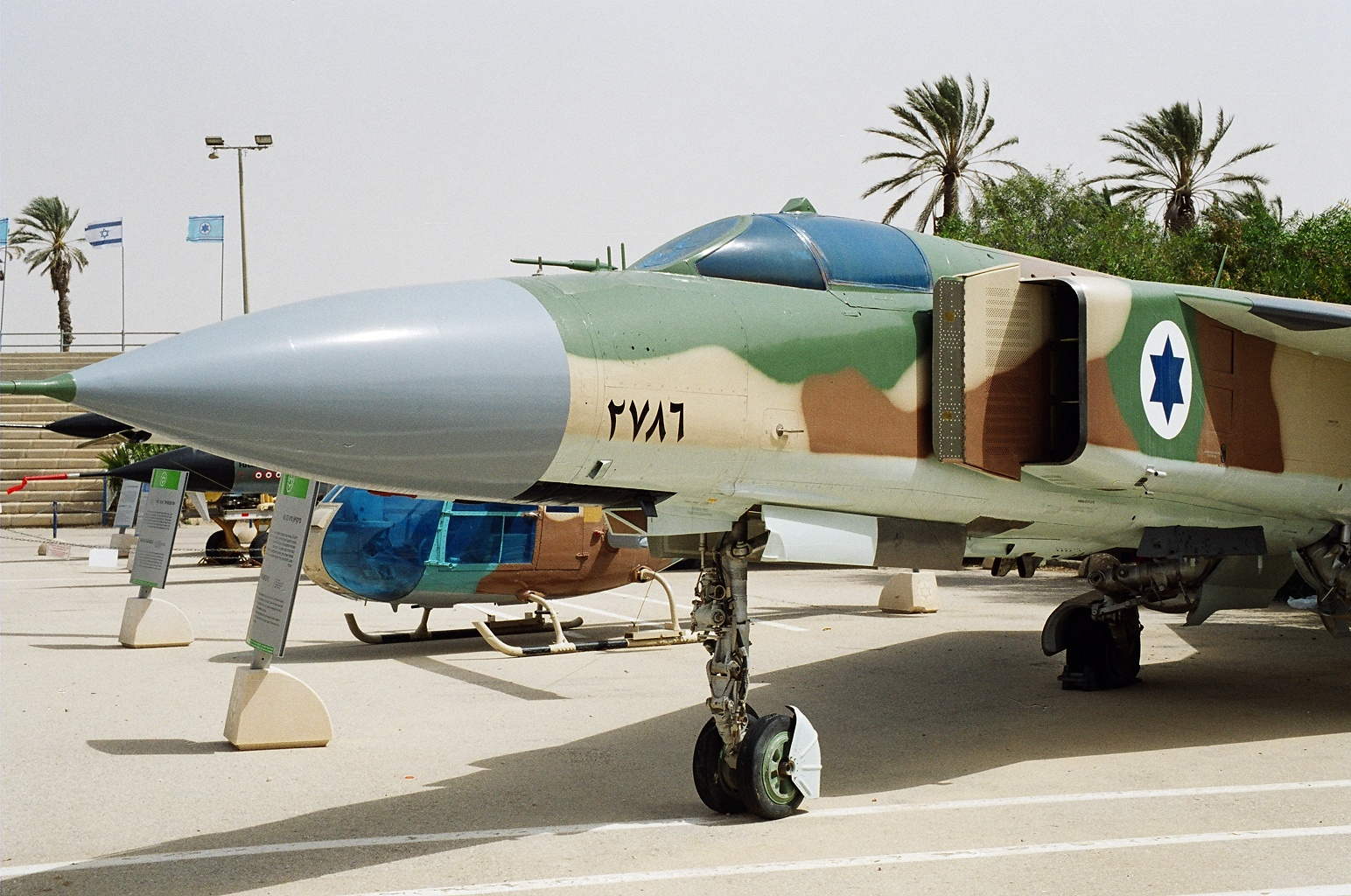
Former Syrian MiG-23 at the IAF Museum

- Aérospatiale Gazelle – Former Syrian aircraft, captured 1982.
- de Havilland Vampire – liveried as Lebanese Air Force aircraft
- de Havilland Venom – liveried as Iraqi Air Force aircraft
- Hawker Hunter – Former Chilean example (J-747, ex-XF445), liveried as Royal Jordanian Air Force aircraft.
- Grumman TBM-3E Avenger - BuNo. 69355
- Mikoyan-Gurevich MiG-15 - former Polish aircraft, bearing Egyptian livery.
- Mikoyan-Gurevich MiG-17
- Mikoyan-Gurevich MiG-21 – No. 007, liveried as Operation Diamond aircraft
- MiG-21 – No. 339, two seat variant, acquired 2011 from IAI via Romania. ex Madagascar AF aircraft.
- Mikoyan-Gurevich MiG-23 – Former Syrian aircraft, defected 1989.
- Mil Mi-24 – #4010, Acquired 2004

=== Partial remains ===
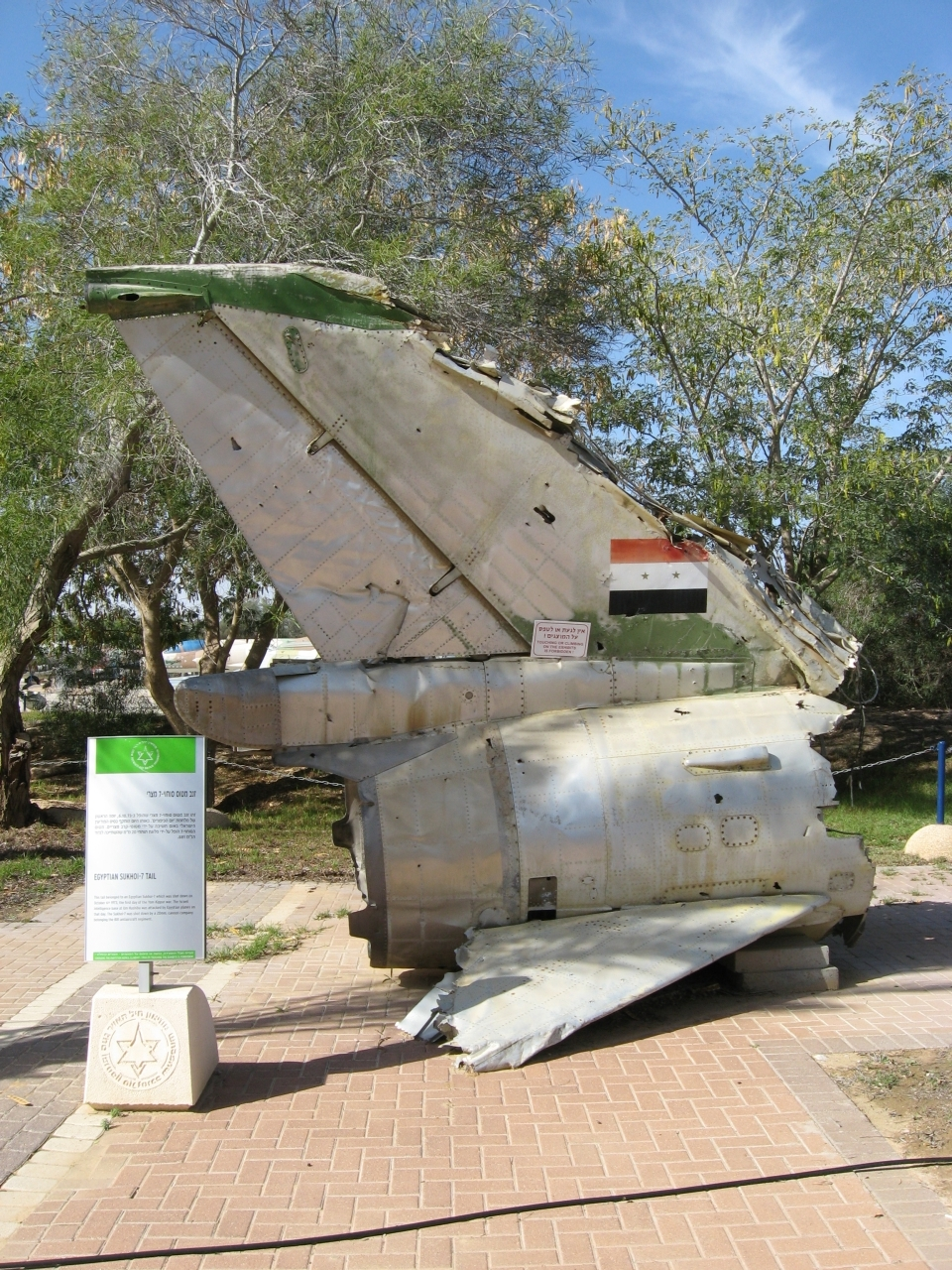
Tail of Egyptian Su-7 shot down October 6, 1973

- Bristol Beaufighter – remains of Israeli aircraft shot down 1948, retrieved 1994.
- de Havilland Mosquito
- Hiller 360
- Mikoyan-Gurevich MiG-17 – remains of Syrian aircraft shot down over the Sea of Galilee in 1966
- Mikoyan-Gurevich MiG-19 – Tail of Egyptian aircraft shot down in 1967
- Noorduyn Norseman
- Sukhoi Su-7 – Tail of Egyptian aircraft shot down during Yom Kippur War
- Tupolev Tu-16 – remains of Iraqi aircraft shot down in 1967

== Anti Aircraft Weapons ==
=== Anti Aircraft Artillery ===
- M163 VADS
- MIM-72 Chaparral
- ZSU-23-4 Shilka
- ZSU-57-2

=== Missiles and AA systems ===
- SA-2 Guideline – mobile launcher
- SA-2 Guideline – static launcher

== Other Vehicles ==
- Plymouth Valiant
- Citroën 2CV
- ZIL-157
- Willys M38A1

== Bibliography ==
- Warnes, Alan (March–April 1999). "Hatzerim Album: Spitfires and Meteors at the Israeli Defence Force Museum". Air Enthusiast (80): 76–77. ISSN 0143-5450.
