= The Assassination Bureau, Ltd =

1963 novel by Jack London

- Author: Jack London; Robert L. Fish
- Language: English
- Publication date: 1963
- Media type: Print
- ISBN: 0-14-018677-8

The Assassination Bureau, Ltd is a thriller novel, begun by Jack London and finished after his death by Robert L. Fish. It was published in 1963. The plot follows Ivan Dragomiloff, who ironically finds himself pitted against the secret assassination agency he founded.

== Origins ==
The novel was based on a story idea London purchased from author Sinclair Lewis in early 1910. London wrote 20,000 words of the novel before he gave it up later that same year, saying he could not find a logical way to conclude it. He died in 1916, leaving the book unfinished. The overall concept borrows heavily from G. K. Chesterton's novel The Man Who Was Thursday (1908).

The novel is about a secret organization, The Assassination Bureau, Ltd., that will assassinate evildoers, for example, corrupt police commissioners, legislators, politicians, etc.; but will not act unless convinced that the target truly is worthy of assassination.

In 1963, mystery writer Fish completed the novel based on the unfinished manuscript with additional notes by London and an ending outline done by London's widow Charmian shortly before her death in 1955.

== Film adaptation ==
In 1969, The Assassination Bureau, Ltd was made into a film, The Assassination Bureau, starring Diana Rigg, Oliver Reed, Telly Savalas and Curt Jurgens. Directed by Basil Dearden, the film was nominated for a Golden Globe Award in 1970 for Best English-Language Foreign Film, and Rigg was nominated for a Golden Laurel Award in 1970 for Female New Face. Whereas London's novel is set in the United States, the film is set in Europe in the 1900s.

== See also ==
- Assassinations in fiction
