= Uri Gil =

Israeli combat pilot and brigadier general

- אורי גיל
- Born: April 9, 1943 (age 83)
- Military career
- Allegiance: Israel
- Branch: Israel Air Force
- Service years: 1964-2003
- Rank: Brigadier General
- Commands: Tayeset 253 (Squadron 253)
- Other work: Artist (painter)

Uri Gil (Hebrew: אורי גיל; born April 9, 1943) is a retired brigadier general in the Israeli Air Force. In 2007, he was listed as the most senior combat pilot in history in the Guinness World Records and a fighter ace credited with 7.5 victories.

== Biography ==
Gil was born in Kibbutz Givat Haim, Mandatory Palestine, the third of four sons. When he was a boy, Gil thought about becoming a composer because he liked to go to clubs to listen to records. He has said that he never wanted to be a pilot, but rather in an "elite paratrooper unit". Gil stated that he "was forced to go to the tests for the pilot course, which are like a game, so I played along and I was accepted against my will". He had no intention of staying on in regular service, but did so because "we were taught to bear the burden". Gil flew fighter jets, and flew missions in the Six-Day War, the War of Attrition and the Yom Kippur War. Gil eventually became a Squadron Commander (253 Squadron), and retired from regular duty in 1985, but still kept flying for another 18 years until he was 60 years old. Gil's last flight was on June 20, 2003. Gil has set the Guinness World Record for being the longest-flying fighter pilot.

== Documentary ==
In 2008, Gil was featured in an Israel documentary titled The Best Pilot in the World. The film was directed by Dr. Amir Har-Gil. In the film, Gil talks about his over 41 years of service in the Israeli Air Force, and the many enemy planes he shot down. Gil stated in the film that he was the only pilot who had downed planes in all the wars.

== Painter ==
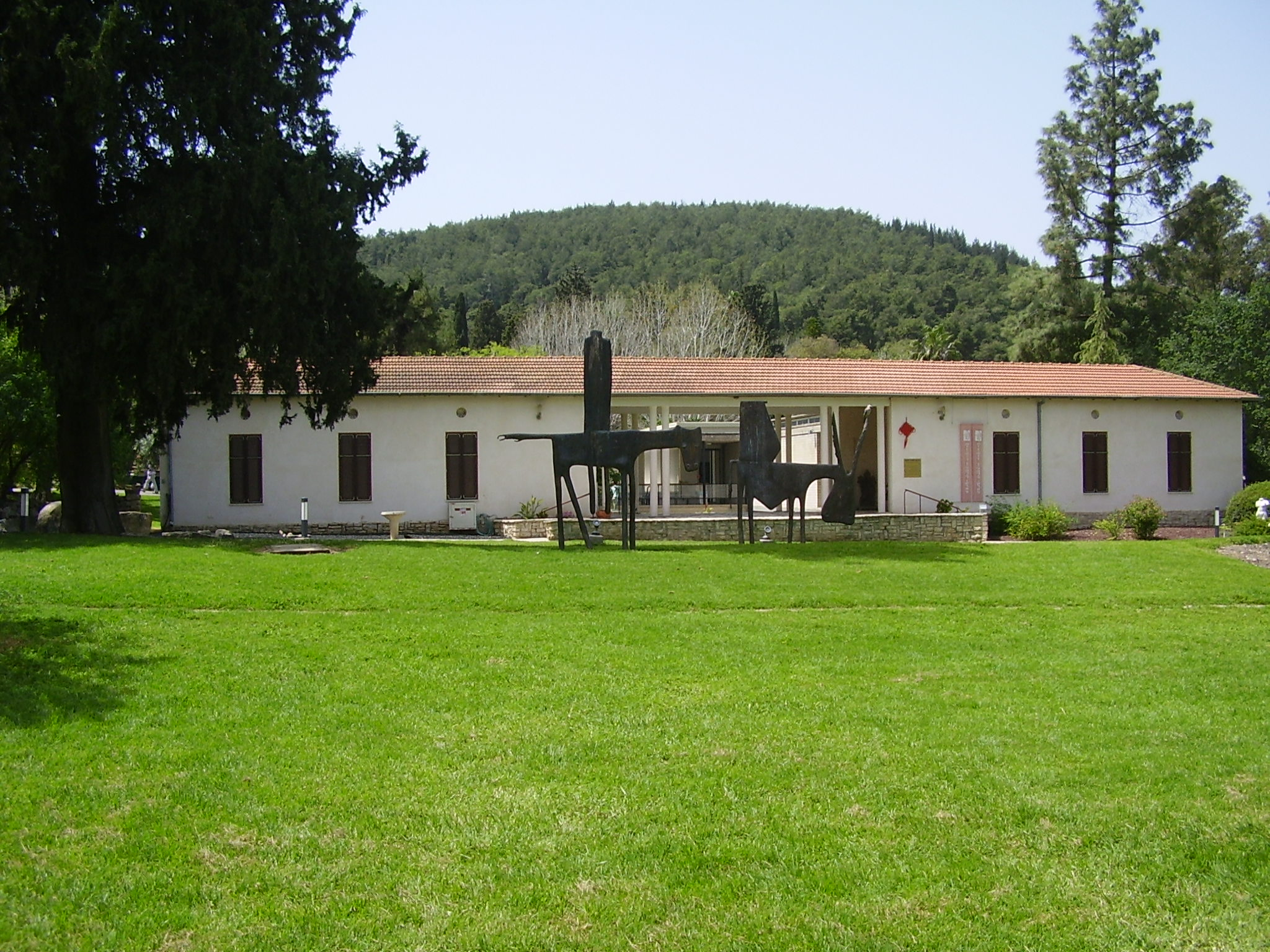
Wilfred Israel Museum

Gil started painting as a pastime when he was in his late twenties while still a career officer in the Israeli Air Force. When he was 42, he left his career in the Air Force to devote his time to painting but continued to fly as a reserve officer until his retirement in June 2003. After leaving the Air Force, Gil moved with his wife to Ein Hod, an artist's village on the coast of the Mediterranean. Gil started doing commissioned portraits, including a portrait from a photograph of Ayn Rand. Gil likes to paint still-life paintings and innocently sensual nudes. In 1995 and 1998, Gil had two shows at the Wilfred Israel Museum in Northern Israel. Gil has also exhibited some of his work in Israeli galleries, but the reviews of his work have been lukewarm or nonexistent.

== Quotes ==
"Every sortie that I flew, every dogfight, is a brush-stroke in my portrait in the mirror into which I will peer when my operational life is over. When I reach that day, I want to be satisfied with what I see."

== See also ==
- Rimon 20
- Israel Air Force
- Wilfrid Israel
