= Mordechai Hod =

Israeli Air Force general

- מרדכי הוד
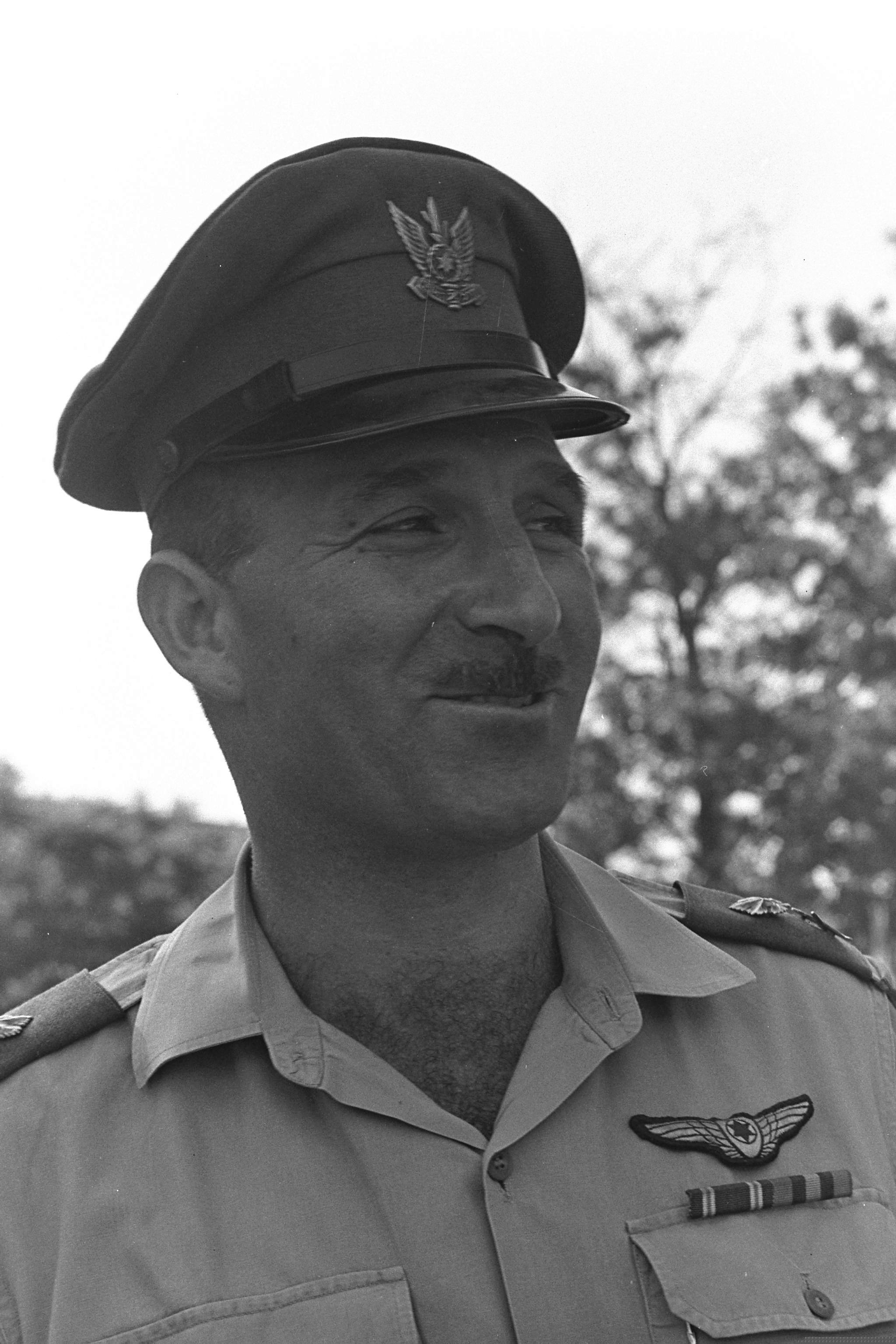
- Born: 28 September 1926; Kibbutz Degania, Mandatory Palestine
- Died: 29 June 2003 (aged 76)
- Military career
- Allegiance: United Kingdom; Israel
- Branch: British Army; Israeli Air Force
- Service years: 1944–1973
- Rank: Aluf (Maj. Gen.)
- Nickname: Motti
- Commands: Israeli Air Force
- Conflicts: Operation Focus; Operation Rimon 20
- Other work: President of El Al (1973–1977)

Signature
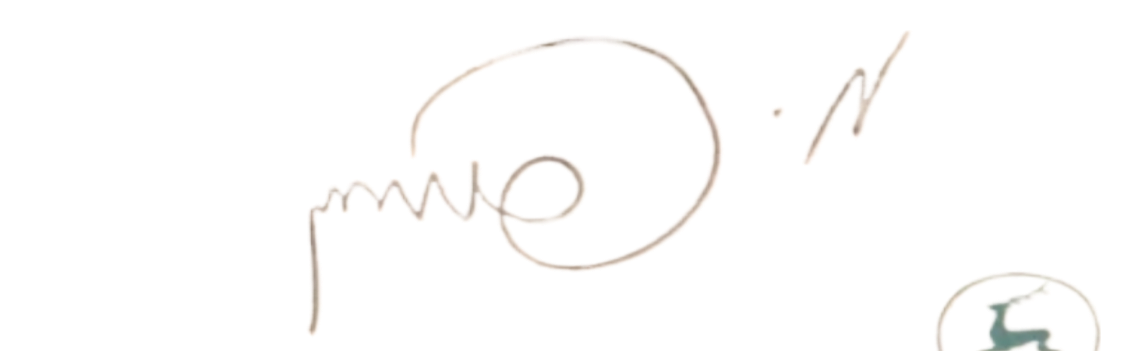

Aluf (Maj. Gen.) Mordechai (Motti) Hod (Hebrew: מרדכי הוד; 28 September 1926 – 29 June 2003) was the Commander of the Israeli Air Force during the 1967 Six-Day War.

== Biography ==
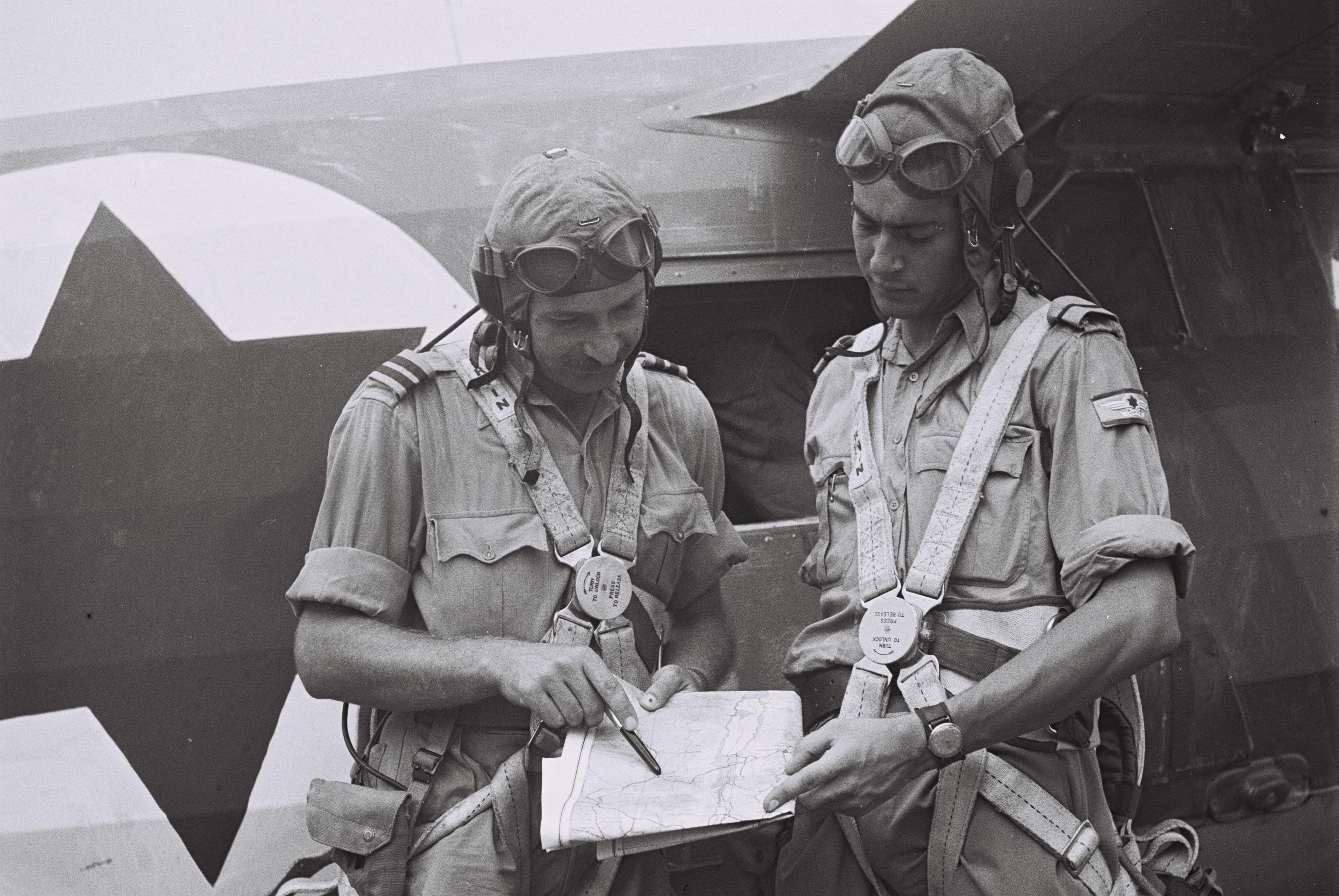
Mordechai Hod, left, in 1949

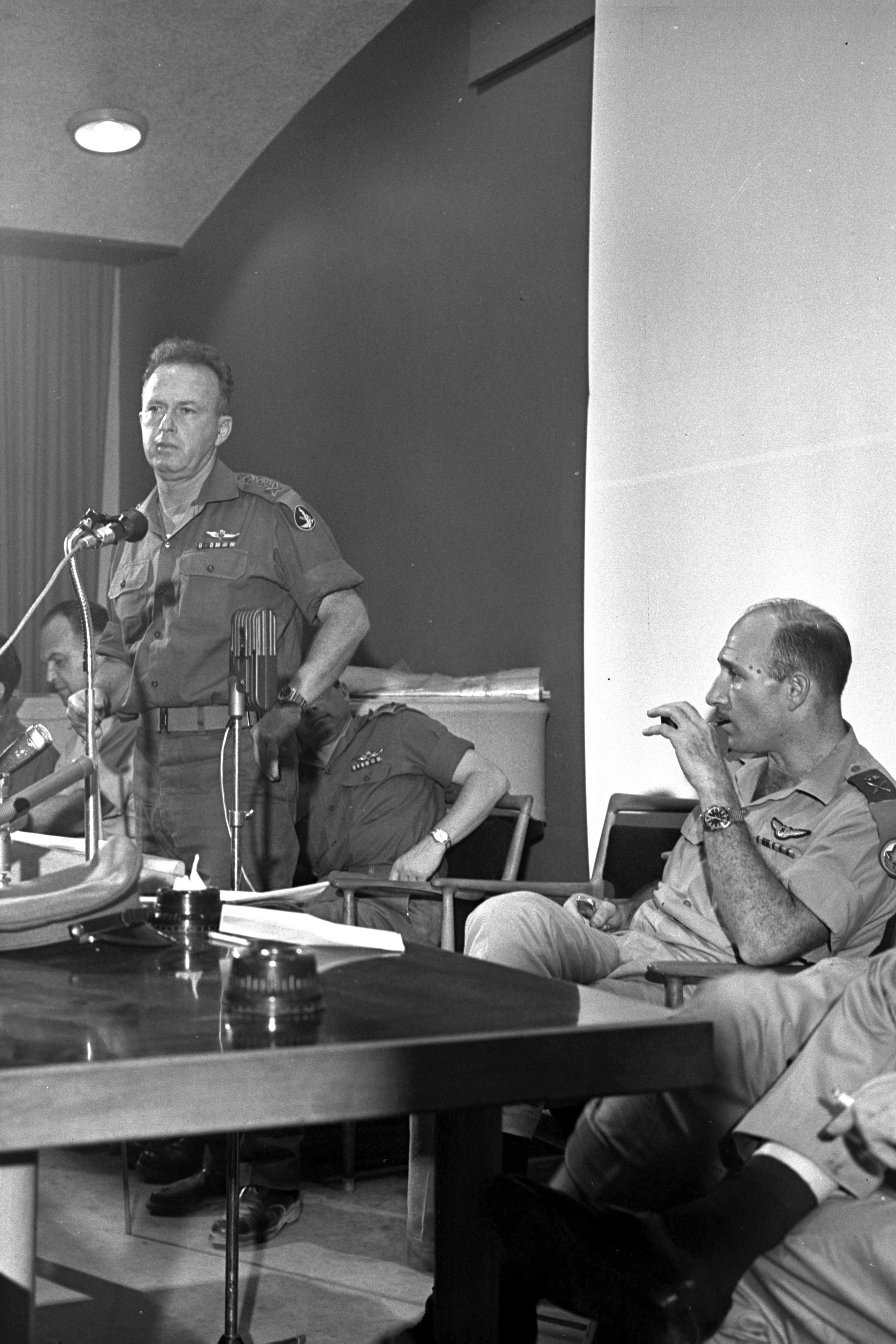
Hod, seated, with IDF Chief of Staff Yitzhak Rabin at a press conference on the third day of the Six-Day War

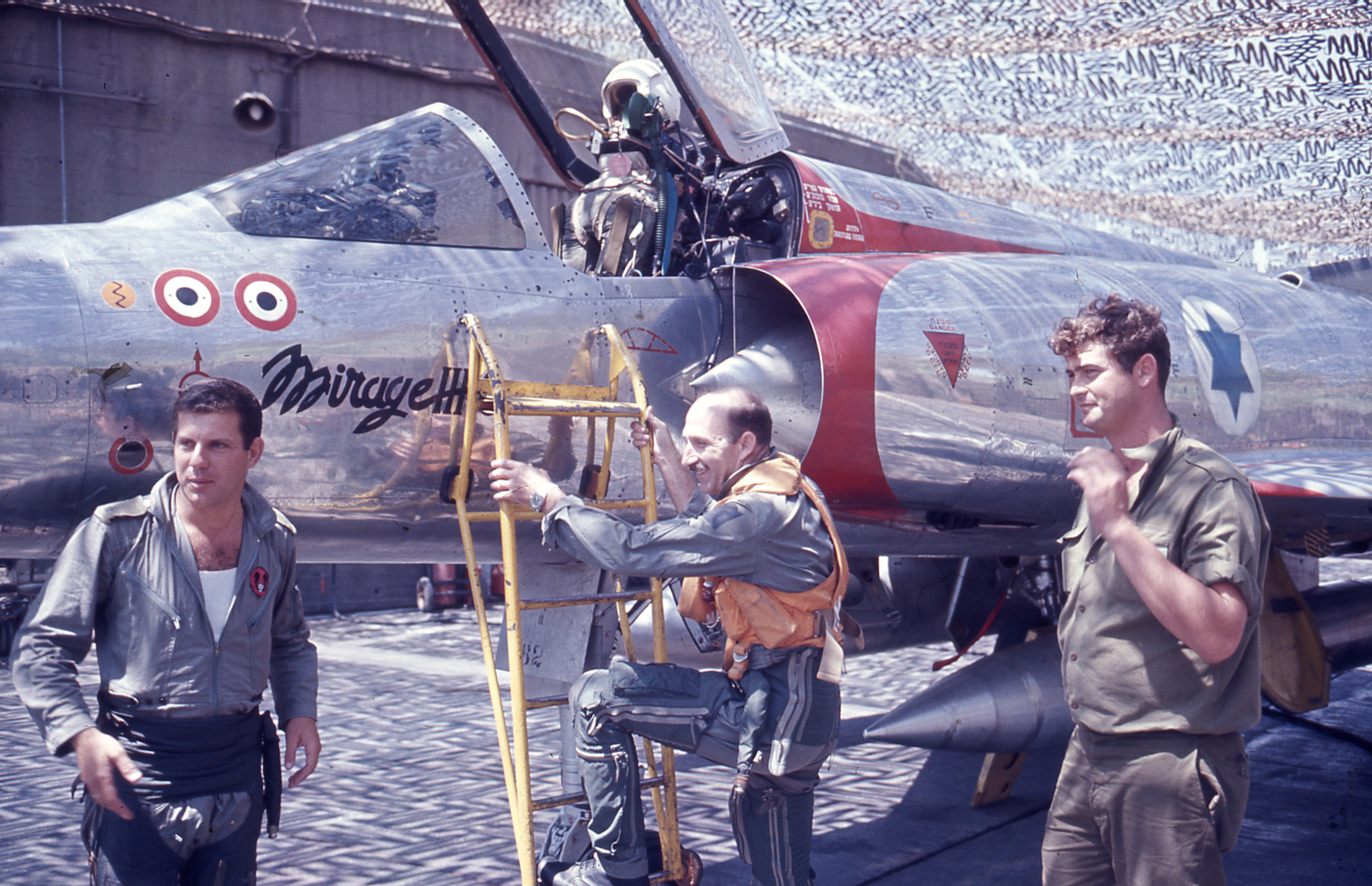
Hod climbing into the cockpit of a Dassault Mirage IIICJ in 1968

Hod was born as Mordechai Fein in the British Mandate of Palestine in Kibbutz Degania in 1926 to Jewish parents, Yosef and Menucha Fein. He later changed his surname from Fein to Hod, keeping with the prevalent custom that period of taking a Hebrew surname when joining the armed forces.

Hod studied at a local Agriculture College before enlisting in the British Army in 1944 during World War II, where he served as a driver in the 178th Transport Company, the transport unit of the Jewish Brigade, and had the rank of Lance Corporal. After training in Egypt, he participated in the Italian campaign, arriving in Italy a few weeks before the German surrender. He spent Passover 1946 at the site of the Bergen-Belsen concentration camp and was deeply shaken by the experience. Hod was subsequently recruited to participate in Aliyah Bet, illegal Jewish immigration from Europe to Mandatory Palestine, as an agent of the Mossad LeAliyah Bet. After the Jewish Brigade was disbanded, he was given the false papers of a Polish-Jewish refugee named Gershon Rosengard and stayed in Italy to assist in clandestine immigration operations while the real Gershon Rosengard was given his identity and went to Palestine. In 1947, after helping load 50 child refugees onto a plane that landed on a temporary runway in southern Italy, he was briefly detained on suspicion of arms smuggling.

Hod took private flying lessons in Italy which were arranged by the Aliyah Bet leadership and was then sent to Czechoslovakia in May 1948. The newly created IAF was in need of modern military aircraft, and had purchased several Spitfires and Avia S-199s in that country. Once purchased it was necessary to fly them to Israel in Operation Velvetta. Hod was selected to participate in an advanced fighter pilot course in Czechoslovakia, where the recruits were trained on the Avia S-199 by George Lichter. He then flew fighter aircraft from Czechoslovakia to Israel.

Hod's IAF career subsequently commenced. He attended the first class of the Israeli Air Force Flight Academy and graduated on 14 March 1949. A year later Hod was again sent abroad, this time to learn how to fly the Gloster Meteor in Britain, which would be Israel's first jet fighter. Returning to Israel in 1951, Hod was appointed commander of a squadron of P-51 Mustangs. During the 1956 Suez Crisis Hod led several support missions, including fighter escort for planes laden with paratroopers and air cover for troops on the ground. He flew in twelve sorties, including an attack that destroyed an Egyptian armored column in the Mitla Pass. For the decade after the conflict Hod continued to advance through the ranks of the IAF. He became a base commander in 1957, and three years later the head of IAF Operations. Just one year later in 1961, Hod was promoted to head of the Air Department in the General Staff. He would stay in this post until 27 April 1966, when Hod became Commander of the IAF. During his tenure, the Mossad conducted Operation Diamond to smuggle a Soviet-built MiG-21 into Israel.

Slightly more than a year into Hod's tenure, Egyptian President Gamal Abdel Nasser closed the Straits of Tiran, and Israel was facing the possibility of a three front war against Egypt, Jordan, and Syria. Hoping to retain the advantage of surprise, Israel launched Operation Focus, the opening airstrike in what would become known as the 1967 Six-Day War. Hod's strike, leaving only 12 planes to defend Israel, and aided with intelligence from Mossad and Aman, succeeded in destroying most of the Egyptian Air Force. Later strikes caused severe damage to the Jordanian and Syrian Air Forces as well as part of Iraqi Air Force. This ensured Israeli air superiority for the rest of the war. In an interview years later, Hod described the 45 minutes it took the first wave of 183 aircraft to reach targets in Egypt as "the longest 45 minutes of my life." Hod also had to deal with the USS Liberty incident, in which Israeli aircraft attacked an American ship off the coast of the Sinai Peninsula, killing 34 servicemen.

The War of Attrition between Israel and Egypt would last from 1968 to 1970, and during that time Hod directed airstrikes near the Suez Canal as well as deeper into Egyptian territory. He also succeeded in downing a number of Soviet-piloted MiG aircraft operating on behalf of Egypt.

In February 1973, Hod gave the order to shoot down Libyan Arab Airlines Flight 114, a Libyan airliner that had strayed into the airspace of the Israeli-occupied Sinai Peninsula and had been identified as a potential threat, which resulted in international opprobrium. In April 1973, he stepped down, just 6 months prior to the 1973 Yom Kippur War. Because of the war he was quickly recalled to act as the Air Force advisor to Maj. Gen. Yitzhak Hofi, who was then in charge of Israeli Northern Command. Before moving into the private sector Hod had one more stint in government, tasked with developing defense projects as an assistant to the Defense Minister. During his military career, Hod met and married a female soldier, Pnina. They had three children; sons Yossi and Yuval and daughter Nurit. and one daughter.

With his military career over, Hod entered the civilian aviation market in 1975 by founding CAL Cargo Air Lines. He served as its president until 1977, when he left to become president of El Al, the Israeli national airline, a position he would hold to 1979. Hod was appointed chairman of the main aerospace manufacturer in Israel, Israel Aircraft Industries, in 1987. He resigned from the position in 1993.

Hod died on 29 June 2003 at the age of 76 after a long illness.
