= Robert L. Fish =

American crime fiction novelist (1912–1981)

- Born: August 21, 1912; Cleveland, Ohio, U.S.
- Died: February 23, 1981 (aged 68); Trumbull, Connecticut, U.S.
- Occupation: Novelist
- Writing career
- Pen name: Robert L. Pike, Lawrence Roberts
- Period: 1948–1981
- Genres: Crime fiction, detective fiction

Robert Lloyd Fish (August 21, 1912 – February 23, 1981) was an American writer of crime fiction.

== Life and career ==
=== Early life ===
Fish was born in Cleveland, Ohio, and studied engineering at Case School of Applied Science, where he graduated in 1933. Afterwards he had a successful career in engineering management and consultancy, working in several countries that he later used as settings for his stories. He served for three years with the Ohio National Guard 37th Infantry Division.

=== Writing career ===
In 1953 Fish travelled to Rio de Janeiro, as an engineering consultant to a Brazilian vinyl plastics factory. In 1960, Fish submitted his first short story to Ellery Queen's Mystery Magazine. He subsequently wrote over 30 novels and numerous short stories.

His first novel, The Fugitive, gained him the Mystery Writers of America's Edgar Allan Poe Award for best first novel in 1962, and his short story "Moonlight Gardener" was awarded the Edgar for best short story in 1972.

Fish's 1963 novel Mute Witness, written under the pseudonym Robert L. Pike, was filmed in 1968 as Bullitt, directed by Peter Yates and starring Steve McQueen, and his 1967 novel Always Kill A Stranger, was filmed in 1972 in Brazil as Missão: Matar, starring Tarcisio Meira and Yvonne Buckingham and directed by Alberto Pieralisi.

Fish also wrote the novel Pursuit, which was adapted into a two-part TV miniseries Twist of Fate, and the Sherlock Holmes parody The Memoirs of Schlock Homes.

In 1963, Fish completed Jack London's unfinished novel The Assassination Bureau, Ltd, based on the unfinished manuscript with additional notes by London and an ending outline by London's wife Charmian shortly before her death in 1955. The book was adapted into the film The Assassination Bureau in 1969, directed by Basil Dearden and starring Diana Rigg, Oliver Reed, Telly Savalas and Curt Jurgens.

=== Death ===
Fish died in February 1981 at his home in Trumbull, Connecticut.

== Awards ==
- 1963 Mystery Writers of America's Edgar Allan Poe Award for best first novel: The Fugitive
- 1969: Edgar Allan Poe Award for the film Bullitt as an author of Mute Witness on which the film was based
- 1972: Edgar Allan Poe Award for best short story: "Moonlight Gardener", Argosy, December 1971

Two other short stories, "Double Entry" (Ellery Queen's Mystery Magazine, January 1969) and "Hijack" (Playboy, August 1972), were nominated for Edgars in the "best short story" category, but did not win.

== Legacy ==
The Robert L. Fish Memorial Award, sponsored by the author's estate, has been awarded annually since 1984 by the Mystery Writers of America to the best first short story by an American author.

== Selected works ==
- The Fugitive (Captain Jose Da Silva Mystery #1) (1962)
- Mute Witness, (1963) written under the pseudonym Robert L. Pike; filmed in 1968 as Bullitt; later republished under that title
- Isle of the Snakes (Captain Jose Da Silva Mystery #2) (1963)
- The Shrunken Head (Captain Jose Da Silva Mystery #3) (1963)
- Brazilian Sleigh Ride (Captain Jose Da Silva Mystery #4) (1988)
- The Diamond Bubble (Captain Jose Da Silva Mystery #5) (1966)
- Always Kill A Stranger (Captain Jose Da Silva Mystery #6) (1967); filmed in 1972 in Brazil as Missão: Matar!, directed by Alberto Pieralisi
- The Murder League (1968)
- The Bridge That Went Nowhere (Captain Jose Da Silva Mystery #7) (1968)
- The Xavier Affair (Captain Jose Da Silva Mystery #8) (1970)
- The Green Hell Treasure (Captain Jose Da Silva Mystery #9) (1971)
- Trouble in Paradise (Captain Jose Da Silva Mystery #10) (1975)
- Pursuit (1978); made into a British TV miniseries Twist of Fate in 1989.
- My life and the beautiful game, with Pelé (Edson Arantes do Nascimento), an autobiography (1978)
- Schlock Homes: The Complete Bagel Street Saga (1990)
