= Twist of Fate (1989 TV series) =

1989 British television drama

Twist of Fate is a 1989 British drama TV miniseries directed by Ian Sharp and starring Ben Cross, Bruce Greenwood, and Veronica Hamel. A high-ranked participant of the botched Hitler assassination plot goes into hiding with the help of a plastic surgeon as a Jew. In a series of twists of fate he becomes a celebrated general of the Israeli army fighting for the creation of the state of Israel. The film is based on the novel Pursuit by Robert L. Fish and initially was given this name.

== Plot summary ==
The miniseries is 2 episodes, 4 hours total.

Episode I. Aristocratic SS engineer Obersturmbannführer Helmut Von Schraeder, in charge of extermination machinery in Treblinka, makes a detonator for the Hitler assassination plot in 1944. After the failure of the plot he goes into hiding by assuming a new face and voice and the identity of an inmate Jew named Ben Grossman with the help of a blackmailed military plastic surgeon, who was experimenting on camp inmates. Von Schraeder arranges to be sent to a French border area camp soon to be liberated by the Allies. However he instead lands in the Bergen-Belsen concentration camp, which wasn't liberated until 1945. Here he makes some Jewish friends. After the liberation by the Allies, he unsuccessfully tries to go to Switzerland, where he has a sizeable stash in a bank account, but he finds himself on his way to Palestine under British mandate (later Israel) with his new Jewish friends. On his way he kills a British officer in a skirmish and becomes an internationally wanted man and wins the respect of the Jews. His Jewish comrades-in-arms notice his military skills (due to his German military training) and he quickly progresses in their ranks.

Episode 2. By 1971, Grossman is a brigadier general and an Israeli hero, but the fate gives him another twist. He is found by the plastic surgeon and the commandant of Treblinka, who were hiding in Argentina, and they blackmailed him into delivering them uranium stolen by Mossad. At about the same time Grossman's son Daniel makes a documentary about Nazi criminals. He focuses on how ordinary people could become monsters and runs into the career of Von Schraeder. In an old photo he sees his own face and begins to suspect this is his father.

== Cast ==
- Ben Cross ... Israeli Brig. Gen. Benjamin Grossman
- John Glover ... Max Brodsky
- Bruce Greenwood ... Daniel Grossman / SS Obersturmbannführer Helmut Von Schraeder
- Veronica Hamel ... Deborah
- Ian Richardson ... SS-Sturmbannfuhrer Dr. Schlossberg
- Nickolas Grace ... Wolf
- Sarah Jessica Parker ...Miriam
- Paul Freeman ... SS-Oberfuhrer Mittendorf
- Simon MacCorkindale ... Manley-Jones
- Larry Lamb ... Davi

== Reception ==
Clifford Terry of Chicago Tribune and Joan Hahauer of UPI had found the plot too twisted and unbelievable. Hanauer describes the plot thusly: "It opens as a Holocaust film. Then it switches to a founding of Israel drama -- there's a scene where the Arabs attack a kibbutz that looks just like an old Western with the hostiles attacking the settlers in the fort. Only the headgear is different. After a boring middle section, the drama moves on to a Ludlumesque conclusion -- without the thrills."

Bob Wisehart thinks that the movie is more than just a thriller: "This far-fetched tale raises serious questions about fate, free will and human beings as flawed but improvable creatures"... "Considering the Ben Grossman half of his life, does he deserve leniency? Given the circumstances, isn't there a kind of cosmic statute of limitations at work here? Caught up in a new life in ways he could never have imagined, what else could he do except continue the charade? Or is he guilty now and forever, a man who deserves punishment no matter what?"

Howard Rosenberg is critical of the way the moral question "how can evil and goodness reside in the same man" was trivialized by a plot that relies on too many coincidences.
