= The Assassination Bureau =

1969 British film directed by Basil Dearden

The Assassination Bureau Limited
- U.S. theatrical release poster
- Directed by: Basil Dearden
- Written by: Michael Relph; Wolf Mankowitz (screenplay)
- Based on: The Assassination Bureau, Ltd. 1963 novel by Jack London; Robert L. Fish
- Produced by: Michael Relph
- Starring: Oliver Reed; Diana Rigg; Telly Savalas; Curd Jürgens
- Cinematography: Geoffrey Unsworth
- Edited by: Teddy Darvas
- Music by: Ron Grainer
- Distributed by: Paramount Pictures
- Release date: 10 March 1969
- Running time: 110 minutes
- Country: United Kingdom
- Language: English

The Assassination Bureau Limited (also known as The Assassination Bureau in the United States) is a 1969 British Technicolor black comedy adventure film, produced by Michael Relph, directed by Basil Dearden, and starring Oliver Reed, Diana Rigg, Telly Savalas, and Curd Jürgens. It was released in the U.S. by Paramount Pictures and is based on Jack London's unfinished novel, The Assassination Bureau, Ltd, posthumously completed and published in 1963. Unlike the novel, which is set in the United States, the film is set in Europe.

The Assassination Bureau Limited was the penultimate film of Basil Dearden.

The film is set in the Edwardian era. In the film, a female journalist commissions the assassination of the chairman of an organization of assassins. The chairman challenges the members of his organization to kill him. If they fail, he will kill them. He is orchestrating a purge of his organization's senior members.

== Plot ==
In London, in 1908, aspiring journalist and women's rights campaigner Sonia Winter uncovers an organisation that specialises in killing for money, the Assassination Bureau Limited. To bring about its destruction, she meets the bureau's young chairman Ivan Dragomiloff and commissions his own assassination for £20,000 after being bankrolled by her employer, Lord Bostwick.

Far from being outraged or angry, Dragomiloff is amused and decides to turn the situation to his own advantage. The guiding principle of the Bureau, founded by his father, has always been that there had to be a moral reason why their victims should be killed; these have included despots and tyrants. More recently, though, his elder colleagues have tended to kill more for financial gain than for moral reasons. Dragomiloff calls a board meeting and challenges the other board members: fulfil the contract or he will kill them. He names his vice chairman as referee, none other than Lord Bostwick.

Dragomiloff goes on a tour of Europe to challenge and systematically purge the bureau's senior members. The first stop is Paris where Dragomiloff disguises himself as Le Comte and goes to a brothel owned by assassin Lucoville. Miss Winter follows him to write her story. When she blows his cover, they have to hide in a laundry room from Lucoville and his guards who use a gas pipe to flush them out. Dragomiloff booby traps the door and escapes with Miss Winter down the laundry chute, while Lucoville is killed when the gas explodes.

Miss Winter is arrested in the resulting police raid but catches up with Dragomiloff on the train to Zürich. There, assassin Popescu, disguised as a waiter, almost manages to shoot Dragomiloff, but he sprays burning brandy in the assassin's face which makes him jump off the train to this death.

In Zürich, assassin Weiss owns a bank. He mistakes a bearded farmer for a disguised Dragomiloff. After realizing his mistake, he is so flustered that he takes the briefcase Miss Winter hands him from Dragomiloff without suspicion. It explodes soon afterwards, killing him.

Next, in Vienna the couple watch a military parade. A man behind them pulls a pistol, but he is trying to assassinate the Archduke of Ruthenia who is watching the parade from a balcony opposite. Dragomiloff remarks to Miss Winter that had the "Bureau" undertaken this Job the Archduke would not have survived. Dragomiloff and Miss Winter go to a restaurant where assassin General von Pinck serves them a black pudding with a bomb inside. Dragomiloff recognizes him and throws the pudding back at him. In the resulting confusion, the pudding lands on the archduke's table, killing him while von Pinck gets away.

Dragomiloff travels to Venice to contact assassin Cesare Spado, who is his friend, but Spado has just been poisoned by his wife and her gondoliere lover Angelo. She knows all about the Bureau, seemingly poisons Dragomiloff and calls Lord Bostwick and Baron Muntzof to Venice to collect the reward. Dragomiloff escapes again, kills Angelo and rescues Miss Winter first from a bomb, then from Bostwick and the assassins. Mrs. Spado is killed when she foolishly tries to blackmail Bostwick and Von Pinck; von Pinck kills her with a Luger pistol.

By now, Miss Winter considers Dragomiloff redeemed. They learn that the archduke's death in Vienna has caused an international crisis and that the leaders of Europe are having a conference at a castle near Linz. Bostwick plans to kill them there, plunging Europe into war. He and the surviving members of the Bureau have already secretly bought stocks in arms companies and seek to make the "biggest killing" of them all.

General von Pinck has commandeered a Zeppelin to drop a bomb on the castle. Using a stolen uniform, Dragomiloff gets on board-he exploits General von Pinck's one weakness-a sword duel to the death! He wins the duel and sabotages the aircraft so that it crashes, killing Lord Bostwick and the remaining assassins, while Dragomiloff floats safely to Earth with a hydrogen balloon. Miss Winter, who was held up at the border, arrives to tell everyone to evacuate-but arrives to see Dragomiloff decorated by the Heads of States whom he has just saved.

== Cast ==
- Diana Rigg as Sonya Winter
- Oliver Reed as Ivan Dragomiloff, chairman of the bureau
- Telly Savalas as Lord Bostwick, vice chairman of the bureau
- Curd Jürgens as General von Pinck the German bureau member
- Philippe Noiret as Monsieur Lucoville the French bureau member
- Warren Mitchell as Herr Weiss the Swiss bureau member
- Kenneth Griffith as Popescu the Romanian bureau member
- Clive Revill as Cesare Spado the Italian bureau member
- Annabella Incontrera as Eleanora Spado
- Jess Conrad as Angelo
- Vernon Dobtcheff as Baron Muntzof
- George Coulouris as Swiss Peasant
- Beryl Reid as Madame Otero the brothel owner
- Katherine Kath as Mme. Lucoville
- Olaf Pooley as Swiss Cashier
- Rudolf Jelinek
- Jiri Lir
- Maggie Wright as Exquisite Girl
- Frank Thornton as Count von Kissem (uncredited)
- Peter Bowles (uncredited)
- Roger Delgado (uncredited)
- Elizabeth Knight nursemaid (uncredited)

== Original novel ==
The film was based on the Jack London novel The Assassination Bureau, Ltd.. London purchased a storyline from Sinclair Lewis in 1910 and used it as the basis of two short stories and a novel. He was two-thirds of the way through finishing the novel (having written 40,000 words) when he died in 1916. The novel was later completed by Robert L. Fish and finally published in 1963. The New York Times called it "delightfully ridiculous".

== Development ==
Michael Relph wrote the script, and submitted it to United Artists who were enthusiastic. Relph said it was written for "a sort of suave Englishman" and Rex Harrison would be perfect. United Artists wanted it for Burt Lancaster. "You couldn't think of anyone more wrong," said Relph.

In May 1966 United Artists announced that Burt Lancaster would star in the film. Relph said he kept rewriting the script but Lancaster was never happy. Relph offered the film to Rex Harrison who wanted to do it but United Artists did not want Harrison to star. The project was put into turnaround. Relph took it to Bud Ornstein at Paramount who agreed to make it. "I'd done so many drafts I don't think it was funny any more," said Relph.

== Filming ==
Filming took place in April 1968.

Michael Flint of Paramount later said the film wound up costing a lot of money "because it was decided that it must be a locomotive", namely, a sort of film which "would really carry weight with exhibitors and eventually television networks buying batches of our films, by virtue of stars or production value". He added that in the case of The Assassination Bureau "we laboured under the delusion that this could be ensured by spending more on 'production value'".

By February 1969, the film had not been released. According to Diana Rigg, "the film company is stuck with the rather awkward - for America - title and hasn't made up its mind what to do". Relph said the film suffered from being involved in a power struggle between Bud Ornstein and Robert Evans at Paramount.

== Home video ==
This film was issued on LaserDisc in the mid-1990s. It was also released on VHS at the same time and later on Region 1 DVD. The Assassination Bureau was restored and released in 1080p HD on an Arrow Films Special Edition Blu-ray in 2023, which included a new audio commentary track and the short critique "Right Film, Wrong Time."

== See also ==
- Assassinations in fiction
