= Operation Diamond =

Israeli MiG-21 acquisition operation

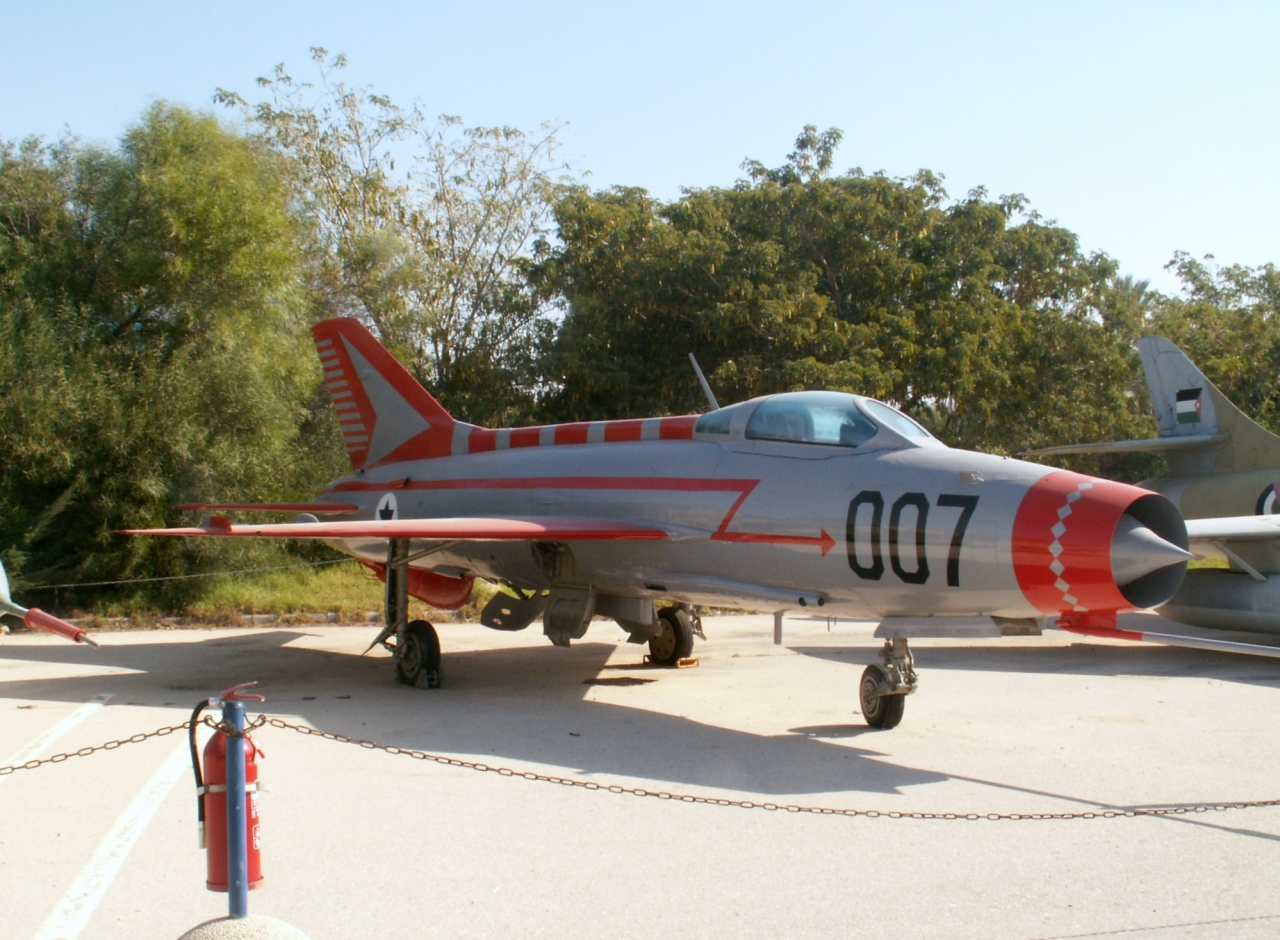
Munir Redfa's MiG-21, the subject of Operation Diamond, at the Israeli Air Force Museum in Hatzerim

Operation Diamond (Hebrew: מִבְצָע יַהֲלוֹם, romanized: Mivtza Yahalom) was an operation undertaken by Mossad. Its goal was the acquisition of a Soviet-built Mikoyan-Gurevich MiG-21, the most advanced Soviet fighter plane at that time. The operation began in mid-1963 and ended on August 16, 1966, when an Iraqi Air Force MiG-21, flown by the Iraqi defector Munir Redfa, landed at an air base in Israel. Israel and the United States were able to study the design of the plane.

== History ==
MiG-21 production began in 1959, and Egypt, Syria and Iraq received numerous planes.

=== The first two attempts ===
The first attempt to acquire the aircraft was conducted in Egypt by Mossad agent Jean Thomas. Thomas and his group were ordered to find a pilot, who for $1,000,000 would agree to fly the plane to Israel. However, their first attempt was unsuccessful. The Egyptian pilot they contacted, Adib Hanna, informed the authorities about Thomas' interest in the MiG. Thomas, his father, and three other people were arrested and charged with espionage. Thomas and two others were hanged in December 1962. The other three members of the group received long prison sentences. The second attempt also failed. Mossad agents ended up assaulting two Iraqi pilots who refused to cooperate with them, in order to keep them quiet for some time.

=== Success ===
Footage of the Iraqi plane

In 1964, a Jewish Iraqi, Yusuf, contacted Israeli personnel in Tehran, as Israel and Iran still had diplomatic relations. Yusuf, since 10 years of age, had been working as a servant for a Maronite Christian family. His girlfriend's friend was married to an Iraqi pilot named Munir Redfa. Redfa was annoyed that his Christian roots prevented his promotion in the military. He was also upset that he had been ordered to attack Iraqi Kurds. Yusuf believed that Redfa was ready to leave Iraq.

A female Mossad agent befriended Redfa, and he told her that he was forced to live far away from his family in Baghdad, he was not trusted by his commanders, and allowed to fly only with small fuel tanks because of his Christianity. He also expressed his admiration towards Israelis, "few against so many Muslims". Redfa was persuaded to travel to Europe to meet with Israeli agents. Meir Amit himself observed the meeting between Redfa and an intelligence officer, using a peep-hole. Redfa was offered $1 million, Israeli citizenship, and full-time employment. Redfa demanded that his relatives be smuggled out of Iraq, which Israel agreed to do. Later Redfa traveled to Israel to see the airfield he was going to use to land the plane. He also met with the commander of Israeli Air Force, Major General Mordechai "Mottie" Hod. They discussed the dangerous flight and its path.

Numerous Mossad agents were sent to Iraq to assist the transfer of Redfa's wife Betty, their two children aged three and five, his parents and a number of other family members out of the country. Betty and their two children went to Paris for what she thought was a summer vacation. Redfa, who promised to prepare her for what was going to happen, told her nothing. When Betty was contacted by a Mossad agent, who had her new Israeli passport, she initially became very upset and threatened to contact the Iraqi embassy, before she calmed down. The other family members were taken to the Iranian border, where Kurdish guerrillas helped them to cross into Iran, from where they were taken to Israel.

The opportunity to defect came about on August 16, 1966. While Redfa was flying over northern Jordan, his plane was tracked by radar. The Jordanians contacted Syria but were reassured that the plane belonged to the Syrian air force and was on a training mission. When Redfa's plane reached Israel, he was met by two Israeli Air Force Dassault Mirage IIIs. Captain Radfa lowered his landing gear, making a signal that he posed no threat, and he was defecting. The interceptors escorted him to land his Soviet-built MiG-21F-13 at Hatzor Airbase, Israel. Later at a press conference, Redfa said that he had landed the plane on "the last drop of fuel".

==== Munir Redfa ====
Captain Munir Redfa
- منير ردفا
- Munir Redfa in Iraqi Air Force uniform
- Born: Munir Habib Jamil Rufa; 1934; Baghdad, Kingdom of Iraq
- Died: c. 1998; Israel (presumed)
- Monuments: His MiG-21 is displayed at the Israeli Air Force Museum, Hatzerim Airbase
- Other name: Munir Rufa
- Citizenship: Iraqi (formerly); Israeli (after defection)
- Education: Military aviation training (specifics not detailed); Iraqi Air Force Academy (assumed)
- Occupation: Fighter pilot
- Years active: 1950s–1966 (Iraqi Air Force)
- Era: Cold War
- Employer: Iraqi Air Force (until 1966)
- Agent: Mossad (facilitated defection)
- Known for: Defecting to Israel with a MiG-21 as part of Operation Diamond
- Notable work: Subject of the 1988 film Steal the Sky
- Title: Captain
- Opponent: First Republic of Iraq
- Spouse: Yes (name not specified)
- Children: Yes (exact number not stated)

Notes
- Redfa's defection helped the U.S. and Israel study the MiG-21, aiding air superiority in later conflicts

Captain Munir Redfa (Arabic: منير ردفا; Syriac: ܡܘܢܝܪ ܪܕܦܐ), born Munir Habib Jamil Rufa (Arabic: منير حبيب جميل روفا; Syriac: ܡܘܢܝܪ ܚܒܝܒ ܓܡܝܠ ܪܘܦܐ); 1934 – c. 1998) was an Iraqi fighter pilot. After Qasim's coup, Redfa was one of only five pilots the new regime trusted to continue serving with the sole Iraqi unit operating the Mikoyan-Gurevich MiG-21, 11th Squadron.

Redfa defected in 1966 in Operation Diamond. His entire extended family was smuggled safely out of Iraq to Israel. Redfa was an Assyrian adherent of the Chaldean Catholic Church. He died of a heart attack around 1998.

== Aftermath ==
Soon after his defection, Redfa's MiG was renumbered 007, reflecting the manner in which it had arrived. Within a few weeks the aircraft took off again with Israeli test pilot Danny Shapira at the controls, on the first of many test flights. The jet's strengths and weaknesses were analyzed and it was flown against IAF fighters. This offered a path to give Israeli pilots sufficient knowledge and practical experience to effectively counter that aircraft type. In May 1967 director of CIA Richard Helms said that Israel had proven that it had made good use of the aircraft, when on April 7, 1967, during aerial battles over the Golan Heights, the Israeli Air Force brought down 6 Syrian MiG-21s without losing any of its Dassault Mirage IIIs.

In January 1968, Israel loaned the MiG-21 to the United States, which evaluated the jet under the Have Doughnut program. The transfer helped pave the way for the Israeli acquisition of the F-4 Phantom, which the Americans had been reluctant to sell to Israel.

== In popular culture ==
The film Steal the Sky (1988) is based on Operation Diamond.

== See also ==
- Operation Moolah
- Operation Synytsia
- Defection of Viktor Belenko
- List of Cold War pilot defections
