= Jisr el-Majami =

Bridge over the Jordan river

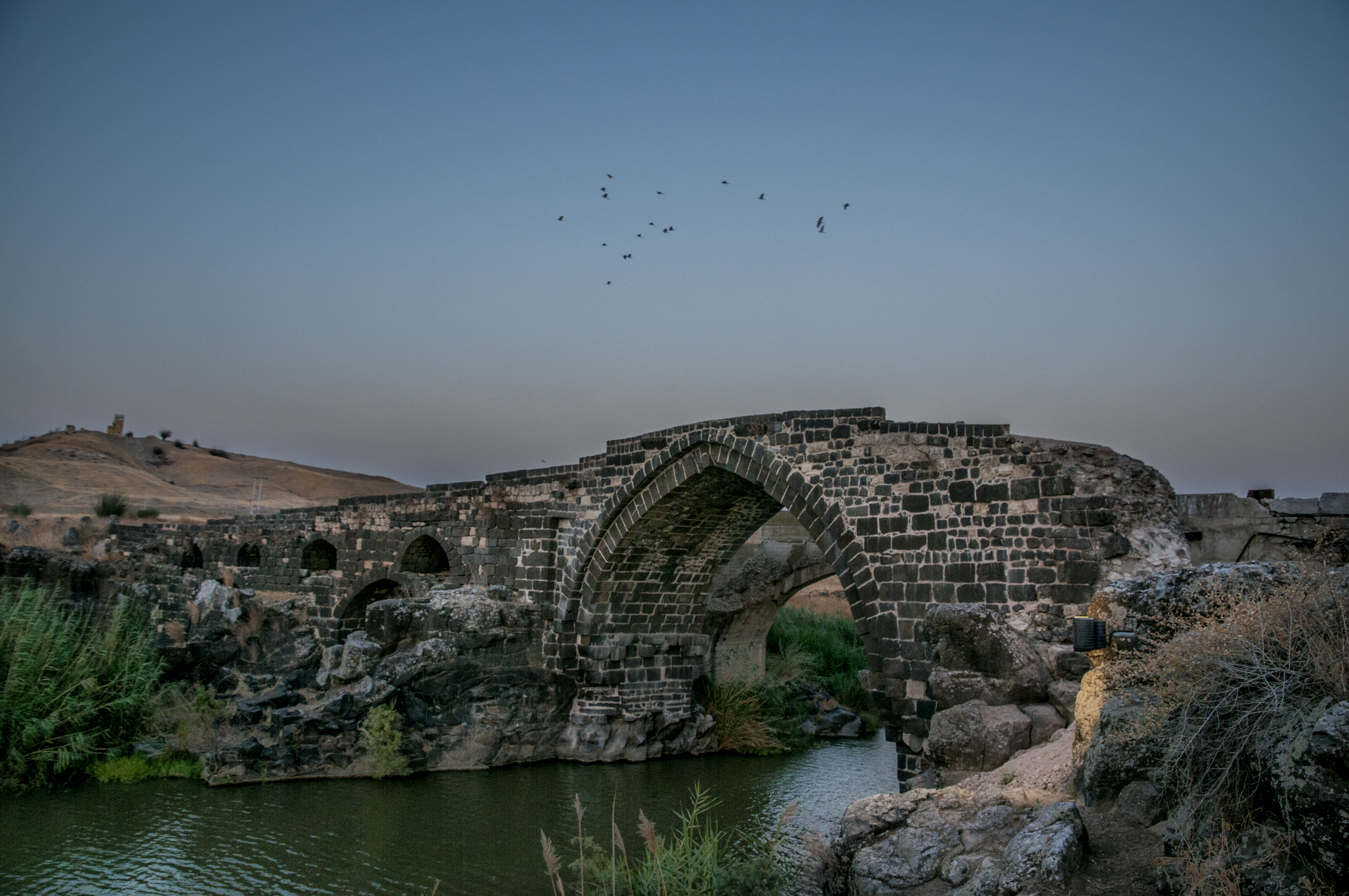
- Jisr el-Majami after restoration (2016)
- Coordinates: 32°37′29″N 35°33′53″E
- Crosses: Jordan River
- Locale: Gesher, Israel and Baqoura, Jordan
- Official name: Jisr el-Majami

Characteristics
- Design: Arch
- Total length: c. 70 m (230 ft)
- Width: c. 18 m (59 ft)
- Height: 10 m (33 ft)

History
- Opened: Roman period (?)

Location
- Interactive map of Jisr el-Majami

Jisr el-Majami or Jisr al-Mujamieh (Arabic: جسر المجامع, romanized: Jisr al-Majami, lit. 'Meeting Bridge or "The bridge of the place of assembling"', and Hebrew: גֶּשֶׁר, Gesher, lit. "Bridge") is an ancient stone bridge, possibly of Roman origin, over the Jordan River on the border between Israel and Jordan. The name is derived from the bridge's location 200 m (660 ft) south of the confluence of the Yarmouk and Jordan rivers.

== Description ==
The bridge is 70 m (230 ft) long, with one main arch being the only one letting through a permanent flow of water. In addition it has six smaller arches, higher up in a second row, presumably to help the flow during flooding of the river.

The bridge has voussoirs throughout its vault, differing from well known Mamluk bridges such as the Daughters of Jacob Bridge, Yibna Bridge and Jisr Jindas, which use small stones in the vault of their arches.

== History ==
=== Roman period ===
The bridge shows at least two major phases of construction; a possibly Roman-origin lower level and the upper pointed arches likely from the medieval period. Some sources state that the bridge was built in Roman times, and others that it was built in the Middle Ages. A 1925 letter written by the Palestine Department of Antiquities wrote that the bridge was first built in Roman times. This is supported by a Roman milestone discovered nearby, which given the scarcity of other local structures makes it likely that a Roman river crossing existed at the point.

=== Early Muslim to Ottoman periods ===
Al-Muqaddasi (c. 945/946 - 991), described "beyond the lower end of the Lake of Tiberias is a great bridge, over which lies the road to Damascus", however, Andrew Petersen believes that Al-Muqaddasi may have been referring to Jisr es-Sidd, further north (by Um al-Junah, near modern-day Degania Bet).

The bridge underwent at least two major repairs during medieval times, by Usama al-Halabi during the reign of Saladin (1174–93), and one by a "Jamal ad-Din" in 1266–67. Shihab al-Umari, writing in the mid 1300s, wrote of a renovated stop en route from Beisan to Irbid called Jisr al Mujami, also known as Jisr Usama, after Saladin's emir who repaired it. A manuscript in the Bibliothèque nationale de France states that it was built by Mamluk sultan Barquq (r. 1380s–90s). An epitaph of a Muslim from Bitlis who drowned at Jisr al Majami in October 1308 has been found under the Ottoman floor in the khan.

=== Early modern ===
A map from Napoleon's invasion of 1799 by Pierre Jacotin showed the bridge, named as Pont de Magama, and the adjacent Khan, marked Caravanserail.

James Finn wrote in 1868 that the bridge was "in tolerably good condition, with one large and several smaller arches in two rows, and a dilapidated khan at the western end... The khan has been a strong edifice, but the stones of the massive gateway, especially the great keystone, are split across, as if from the effects of gunpowder." Finn noted a story of "the wandering minstrels, even now among the Bedaween, sing the songs of the forty orphan youths who competed in poetic compositions under the influence of love for an Arab maiden at the bridge of Mejama'a." The PEF's Survey of Western Palestine (SWP) noted that the name was related to the "Bridge of the Gatherer", which became the As-Sirāt.

=== 20th century ===
The bridge played a strategic role in World War I; it was captured by the 19th Lancers during the Capture of Afulah and Beisan. When the Rutenberg concession was given, it was defined as the area around Jisr Majami.

The bridge was spared during the 1946 Night of the Bridges, but was damaged during the 1948 Arab–Israeli War, primarily caused by the explosion of mines placed on the parallel 1920s road bridge.

=== 2014 renovation ===
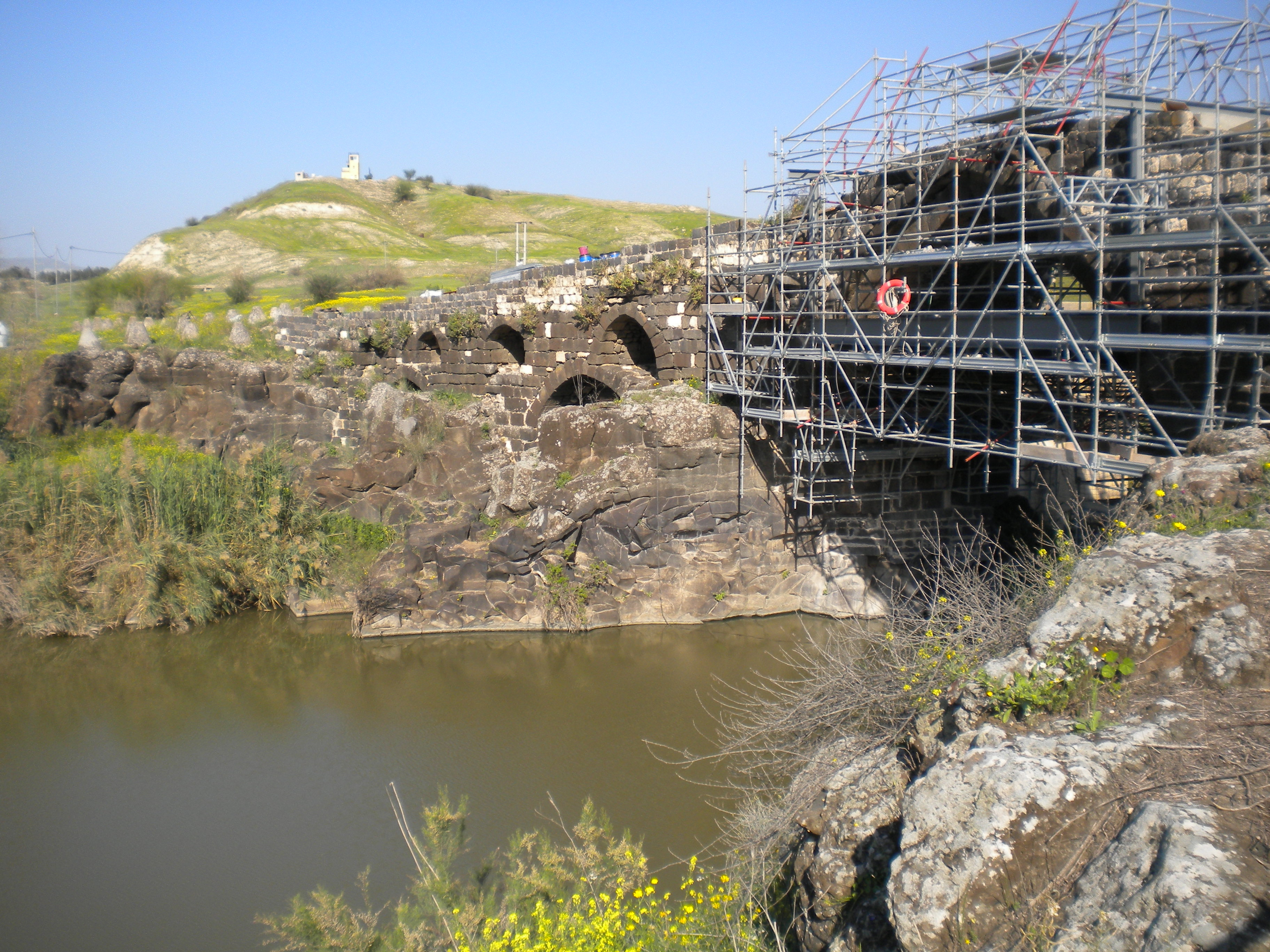
2014 renovations

The bridge was renovated in 2014 by the Italian Ministry of Cultural Heritage and Activities together with the Jordanian Department of Antiquities and the Israel Antiquities Authority.

== Modern bridges ==
A railway bridge was built parallel to it in the early 20th century to carry to Jezreel Valley railway, opened in May 1904, and a road bridge was built in the early 1920s. At 246 m (807 ft) below sea-level, it was the lowest point ever reached by railway anywhere in the world.

== Khan and settlements ==
=== Khan ===
Around 1365 a khan (caravanserai) was built at Jisr al Majami.

In 1849, William F. Lynch described the ruins of the khan as “A ruined khan crowned the crest of the hill, at the foot of which large masses of volcanic rock or tufa were lying about, as if shaken from the solid mass by the spasm of an earthquake. The khan had evidently been a solid structure and destroyed by some convulsion, so scattered were the thick and ponderous masses of masonry.”

In 1875 Victor Guérin visited, and noted the remains of the deserted khan. The khan was two stories high, built around a courtyard. It was built of basalt stones, with the gates done in the ablaq style; alternating white and black stones. The khan had only one entry. Not far from the khan Guérin noted the ancient bridge, with a central arch being much larger than the side-arches.

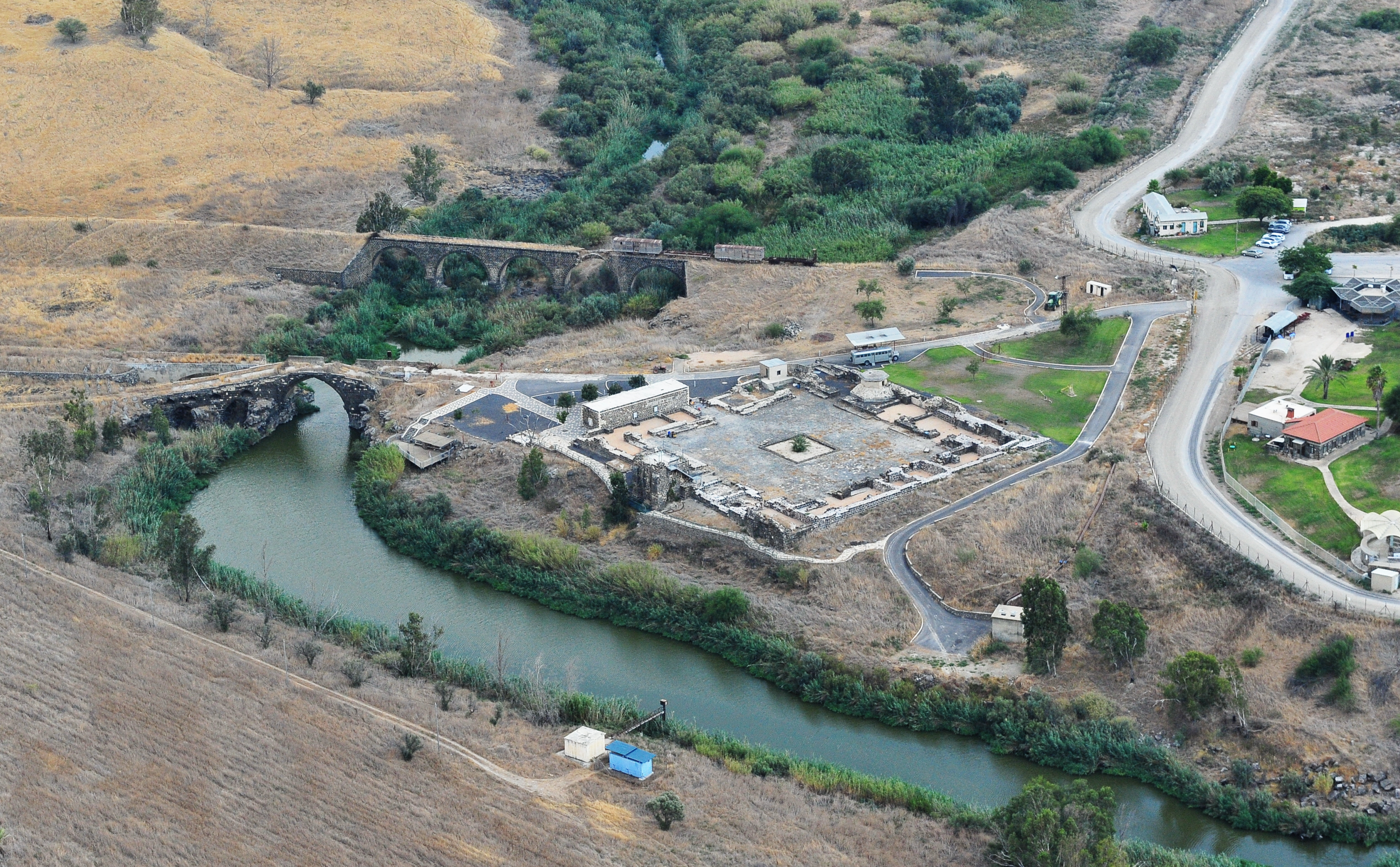
2014 bird's eye view of the medieval bridge concealing the modern road bridge behind it, the railway bridge, and the square-shaped ruins of the khan

In 1882 the Palestine Exploration Fund's Survey of Western Palestine (SWP) described a "ruined Khan, or 'hostel', a large square building with vaults beneath, still in a good state of preservation."

=== Arab settlement ===
A small settlement in the caravanserai existed until the early 20th century, in the 1922 census of Palestine, conducted by the British Mandate authorities, Jisr al Majami had a population of 121; 112 Muslims, 4 Jews and 5 Christians, where all the Christians were of the Orthodox faith.

=== Kibbutz ===
Following the building of the First Jordan Hydro-Electric Power House, the population had totally changed in the 1931 census to a total of 320; 3 Muslim, 316 Jewish and 3 Christian, in a total of in 43 houses. Some of these building were inside the khan itself.

13 August 1939, at the end of the 1936–1939 Arab revolt in Palestine, a Jewish "Tower and Stockade" settlement was established, known as Kibbutz Gesher.

In the 1945 statistics Jisr al Majami had 250 inhabitants; 230 Jews, 10 Muslims and 10 Christians, and the total land area was 458 dunams. A total of 15 dunams were used for citrus and bananas, 274 dunums were used for cereals, while 169 dunams were classified as uncultivable land.

The damaged kibbutz was evacuated after the fighting during the 1948 Arab–Israeli War and rebuilt approximately 1 km (0.62 mi) to the west, at its present location.

== Gallery ==
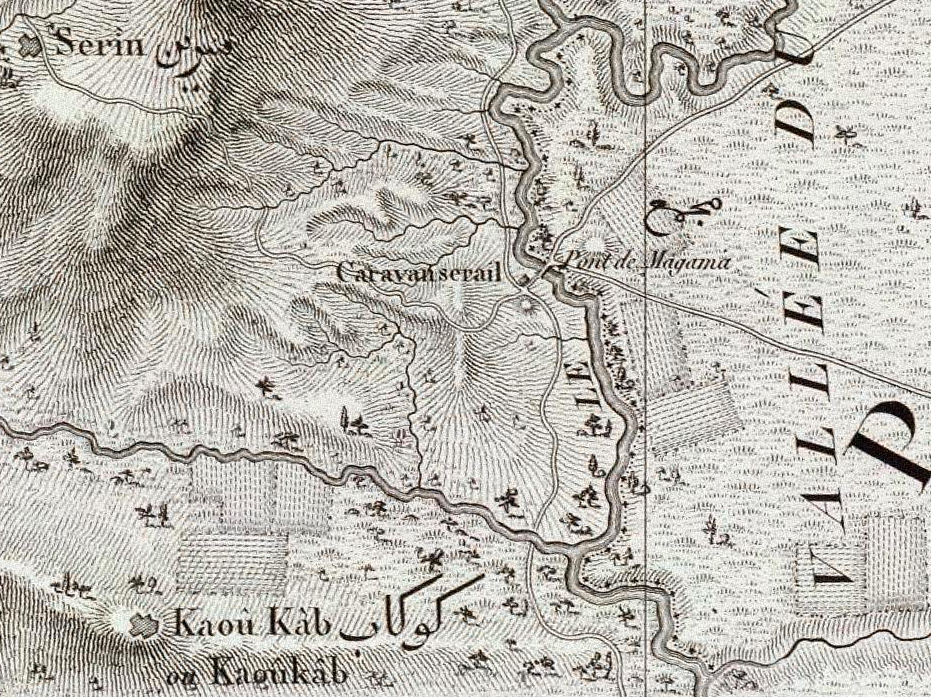
1799 map (detail) by Pierre Jacotin

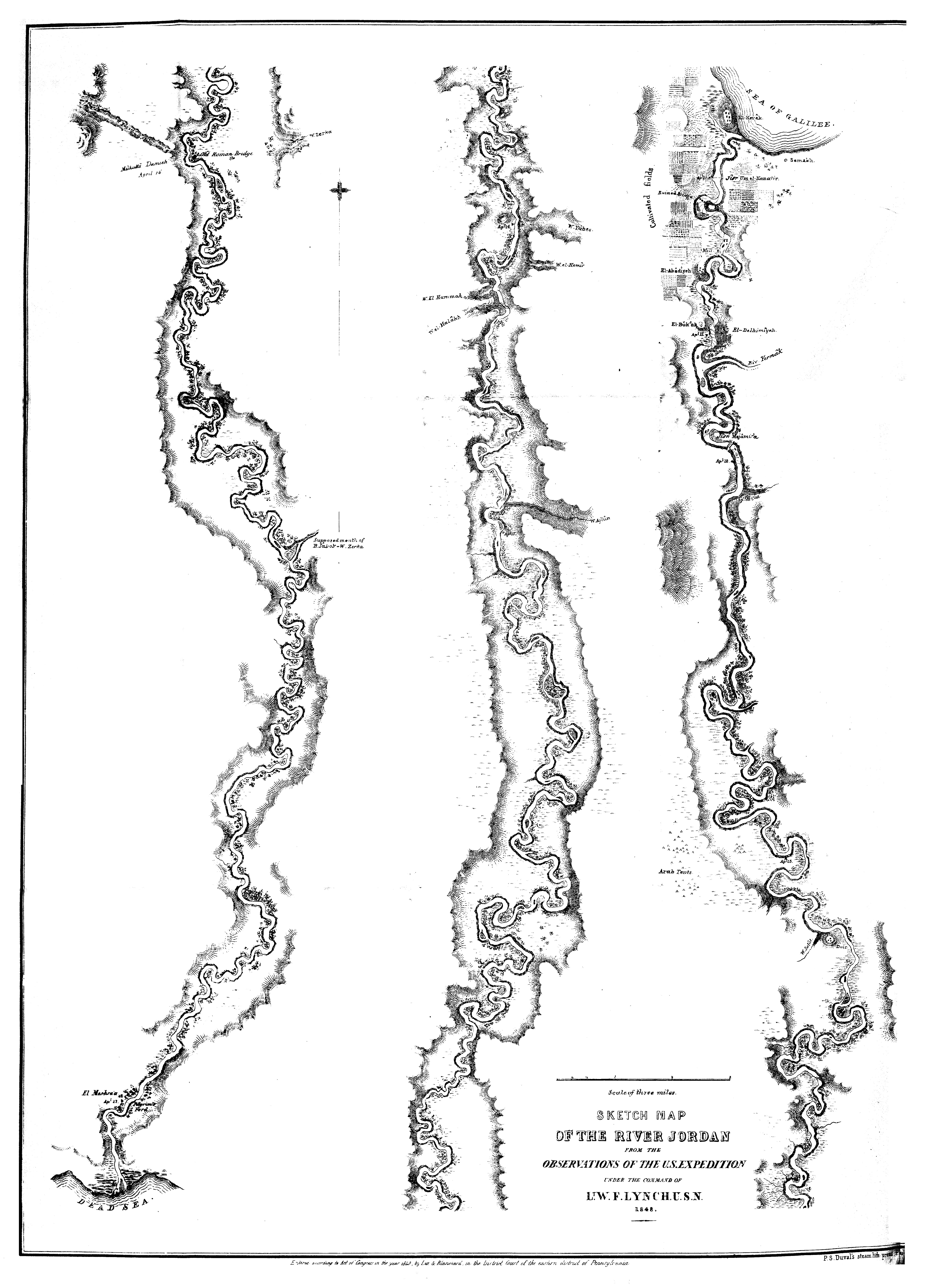
1849 William F. Lynch map of the Jordan River showing Jisr el-Majami, as well as Jisr ed Damiye

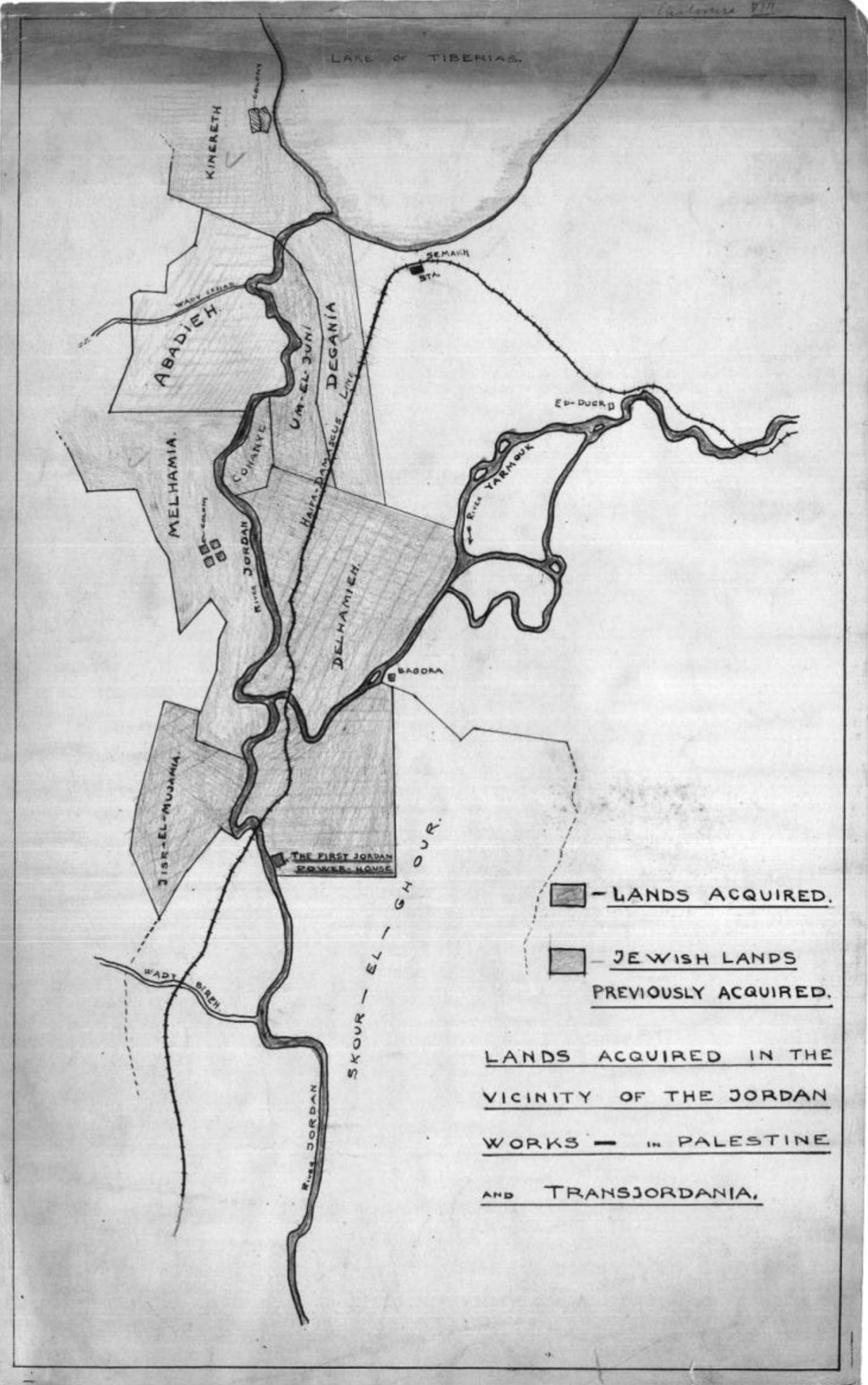
The land surrounding the bridge was acquired by Palestine Electric Company in the 1920s

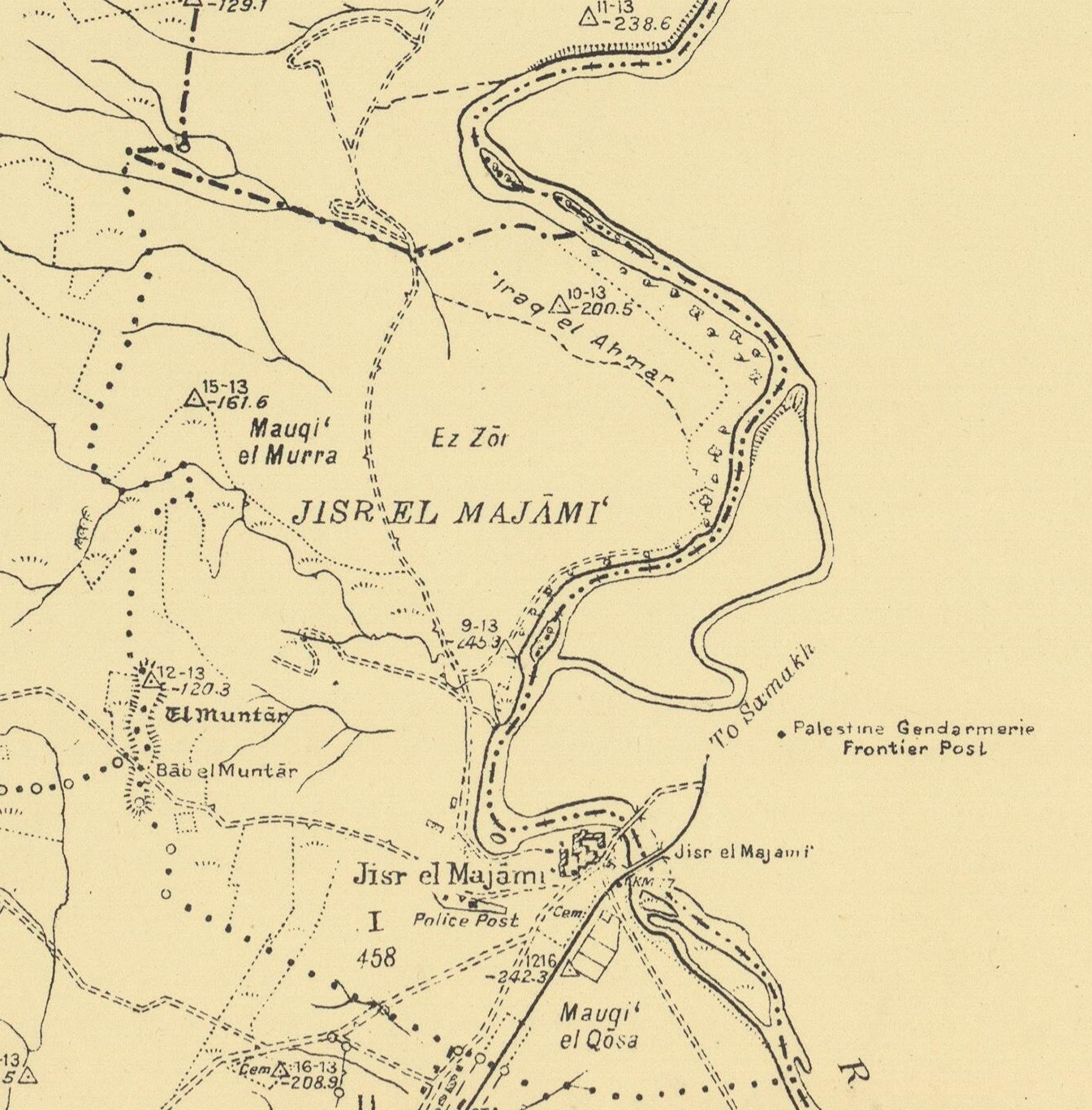
1928 Survey of Palestine map of the Jisr el Majami "village boundary" area

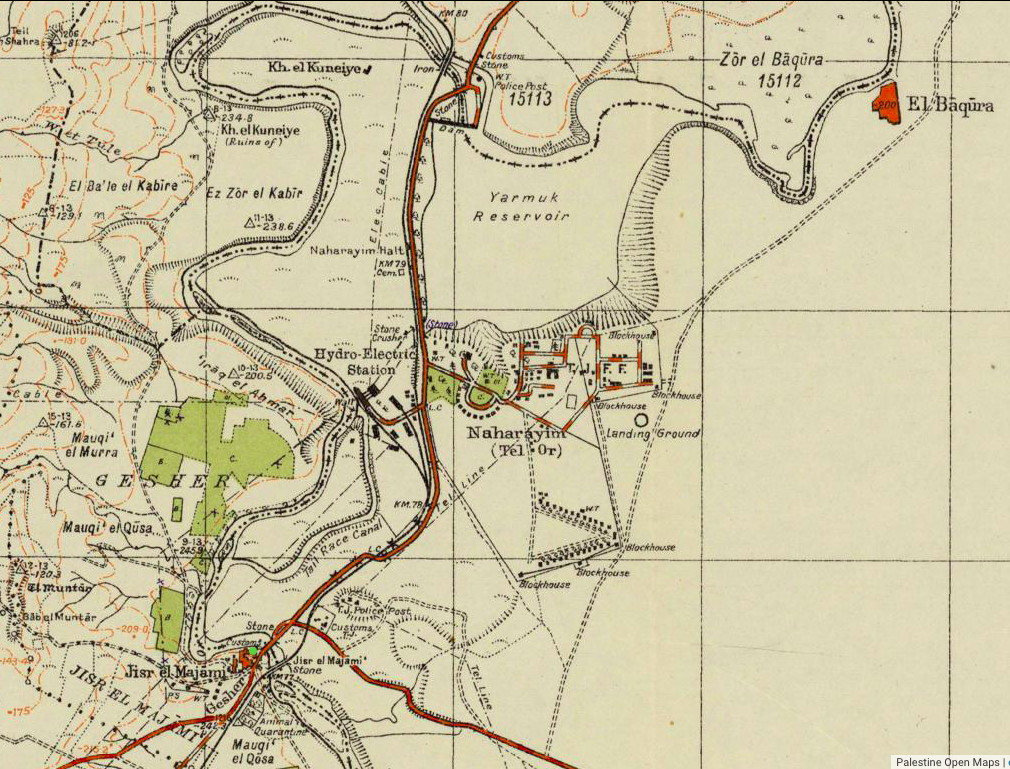
1942 Survey of Palestine map of the area: the northern part of the area had become part of Kibbutz Gesher (est. 1939)
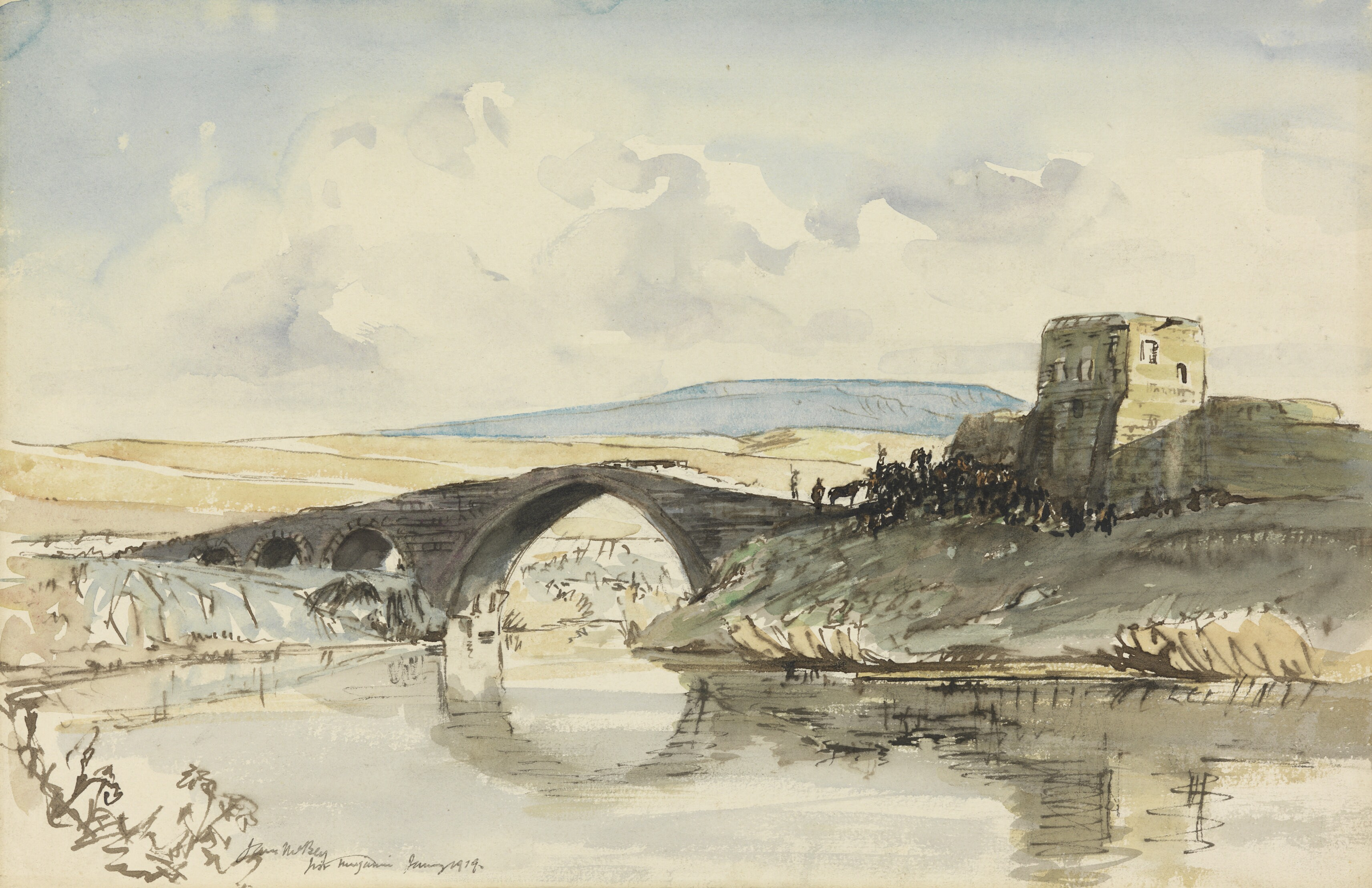
1919 sketch, showing much of the old Khan standing

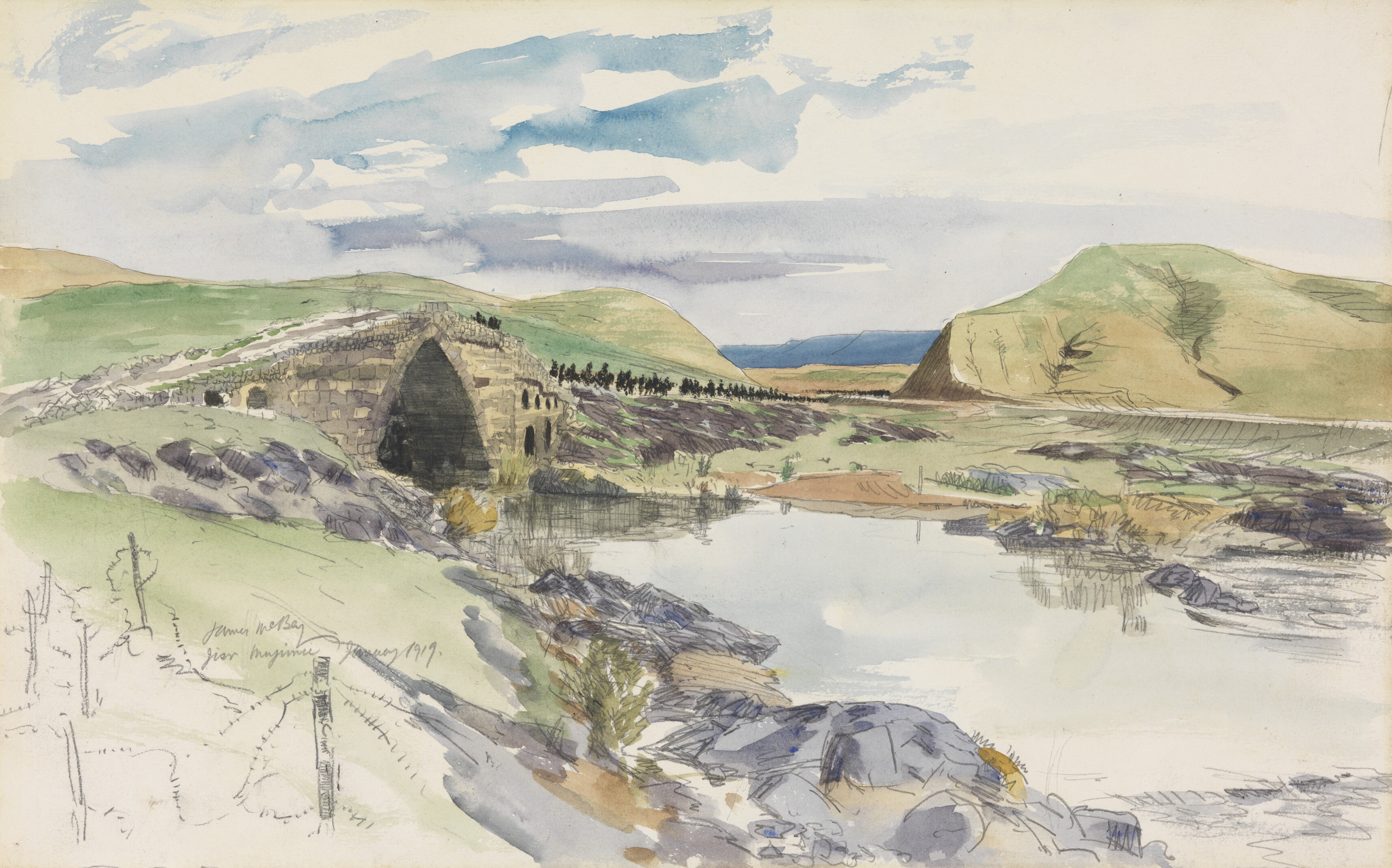
1919 sketch

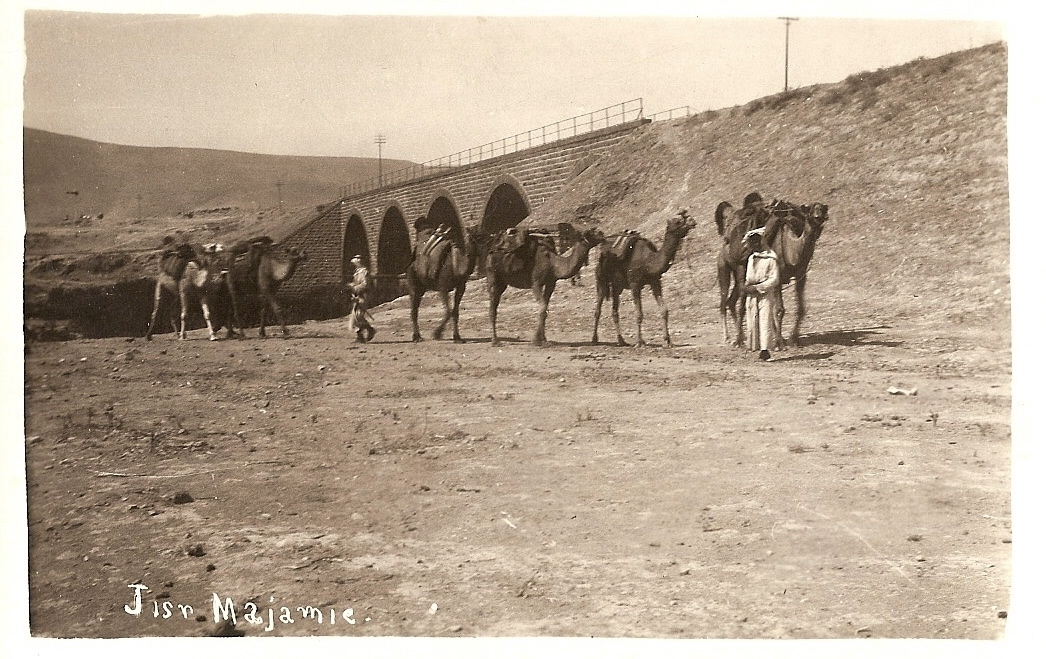
The Ottoman railway bridge, photo by Karimeh Abbud, late 1920s

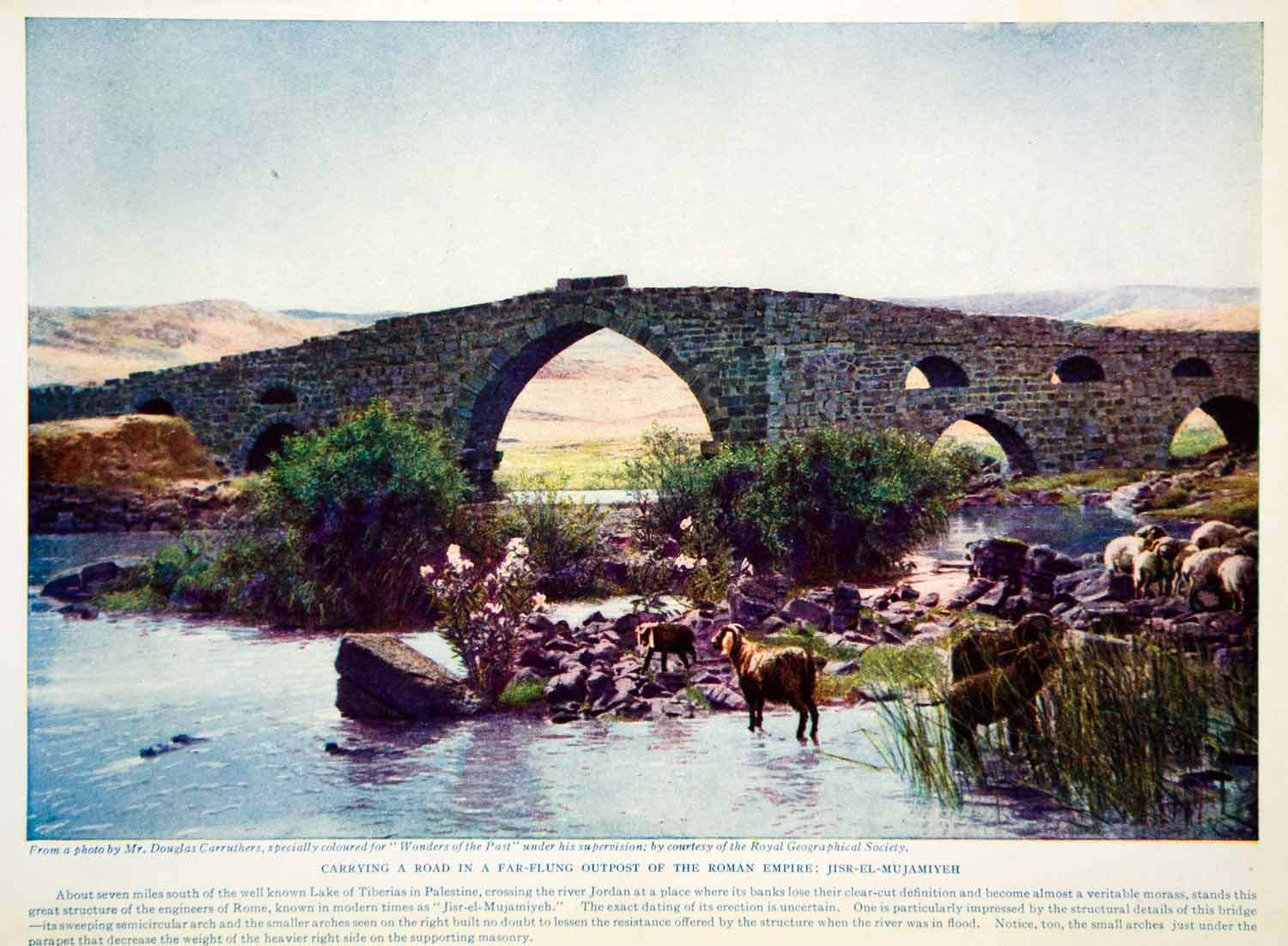
1924, prior to the construction of the parallel road bridge

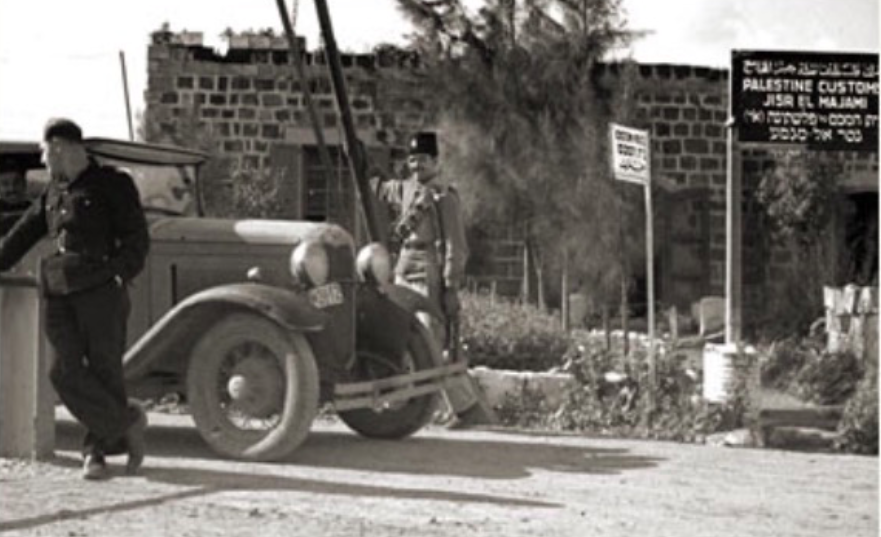
Customs point in the 1930s

== See also ==
- List of Roman bridges
- Barid, Muslim postal network renewed during Mamluk period (roads, bridges, khans)
  - Jisr al-Ghajar, stone bridge south of Ghajar
  - Daughters of Jacob Bridge (Jisr Banat Yaqub), Mamluk bridge on the upper Jordan River
  - Al-Sinnabra Crusader bridge, with nearby Jisr Umm el-Qanatir/Jisr Semakh and Jisr es-Sidd further downstream
  - Jisr Jindas, Mamluk bridge over the Ayalon near Lod and Ramla, Israel
  - Yibna Bridge or "Nahr Rubin Bridge"
  - Isdud Bridge (Mamluk, 13th century) outside Ashdod/Isdud
  - Jisr ed-Damiye, bridges over the Jordan (Roman, Mamluk, modern)

== Bibliography ==
- Barron, J.B., ed. (1923). Palestine: Report and General Abstracts of the Census of 1922. Government of Palestine.
- Conder, C.R.; Kitchener, H.H. (1882). The Survey of Western Palestine: Memoirs of the Topography, Orography, Hydrography, and Archaeology. Vol. 2. London: Committee of the Palestine Exploration Fund.
- Department of Statistics (1945). Village Statistics, April, 1945. Government of Palestine.
- Finn, J. (1877). Byeways in Palestine. London: James Nisbet.
- Grootkerk, Salomon E. (2000). Ancient sites in Galilee: a toponymic gazetteer (Illustrated ed.). BRILL. ISBN 978-90-04-11535-4. (p. 338)
- Guérin, V. (1880). Description Géographique Historique et Archéologique de la Palestine (in French). Vol. 3: Galilee, pt. 1. Paris: L'Imprimerie Nationale.
- Hadawi, S. (1970). Village Statistics of 1945: A Classification of Land and Area ownership in Palestine. Palestine Liberation Organization Research Centre.
- Karmon, Y. (1960). "An Analysis of Jacotin's Map of Palestine" (PDF). Israel Exploration Journal. 10 (3, 4): 155–173, 244–253. Archived from the original (PDF) on 2019-12-22.
- Irby, C.L.; Mangles, J. (1823). Travels in Egypt and Nubia, Syria, and Asia Minor; during the years 1817 & 1818. London: Printed for Private Distribution by T. White & Co. (p. 301)
- Le Strange, G. (1890). Palestine Under the Moslems: A Description of Syria and the Holy Land from A.D. 650 to 1500. Committee of the Palestine Exploration Fund.
- Mills, E., ed. (1932). Census of Palestine 1931. Population of Villages, Towns and Administrative Areas (PDF). Jerusalem: Government of Palestine.
- Mokary, Abdullah; Gal, Zvi (2005). Khan Gesher (Jisr el-Majami). Vol. 50. 'Atiqot. pp. 195–207.
- Mukaddasi (1886). Description of Syria, including Palestine. London: Palestine Pilgrims' Text Society.
- Palmer, E.H. (1881). The Survey of Western Palestine: Arabic and English Name Lists Collected During the Survey by Lieutenants Conder and Kitchener, R. E. Transliterated and Explained by E.H. Palmer. Committee of the Palestine Exploration Fund.
- Petersen, Andrew (2001). A Gazetteer of Buildings in Muslim Palestine (British Academy Monographs in Archaeology). Vol. 1. Oxford University Press. ISBN 978-0-19-727011-0. Archived from the original on 2021-05-29.
- Petersen, A. (2008): Bridges in Medieval Palestine, in U. Vermeulen & K. Dhulster (eds.), History of Egypt & Syria in the Fatimid, Ayyubid & Mamluk Eras V Archived 2016-06-04 at the Wayback Machine, V. Peeters, Leuven
- Robinson, E.; Smith, E. (1841). Biblical Researches in Palestine, Mount Sinai and Arabia Petraea: A Journal of Travels in the year 1838. Vol. 2. Boston: Crocker & Brewster. 260 app. 168
- Robinson, E.; Smith, E. (1856). Later Biblical Researches in Palestine and adjacent regions: A Journal of Travels in the year 1852. London: John Murray. (pp. 340-1)
- Sharon, M. (1997). Corpus Inscriptionum Arabicarum Palaestinae, A. Vol. 1. BRILL. ISBN 90-04-10833-5.
- Sharon, M. (2009). Corpus Inscriptionum Arabicarum Palaestinae, G. Vol. 4. BRILL. ISBN 978-90-04-17085-8.
