= Yibna Bridge =

Yibna Bridge: גשר יבנה; جسر يبنا
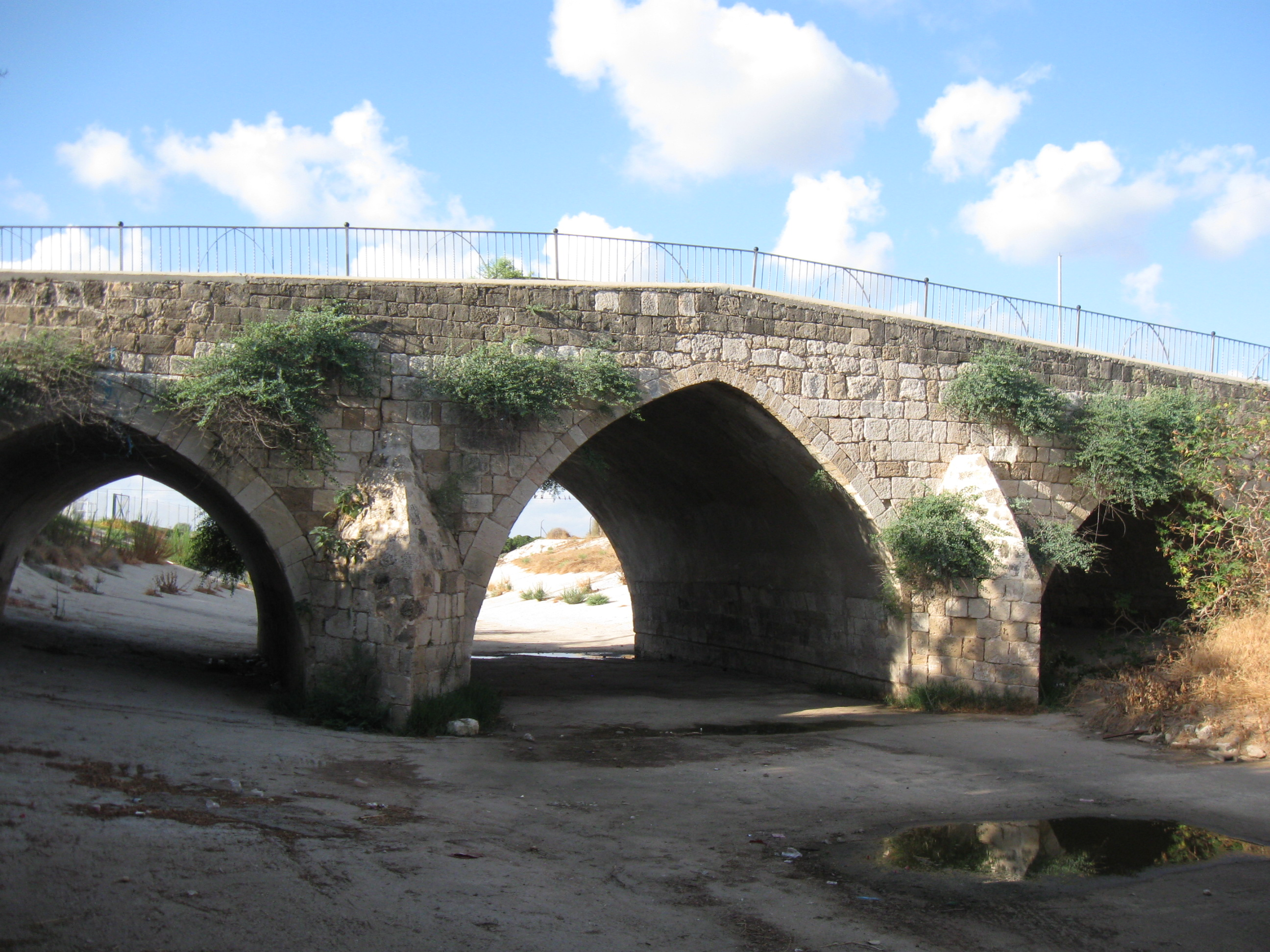
- Coordinates: 31°54′N 34°48′E
- Crosses: Nahal Sorek
- Locale: Yibna, Israel

Characteristics
- Design: Arch
- Total length: 48 metres
- Width: 11.5 metres

History
- Opened: 1273–1274 CE

The Yibna Bridge (Hebrew: גשר יבנה, Arabic: جسر يبنا) or Nahr Rubin Bridge is a Mamluk arch bridge near Yibna, which crosses the Nahal Sorek (formerly known as Nahr Rubin, or Wadi al-Tahuna). It was previously used by Route 410 to Rehovot, and was known as the Jumping Bridge (הגשר הקופץ) due to a bump in the middle of the bridge which caused cars to jump if speeding. It is now a part of a recreation ground, next to a new bridge carrying the Route 410.

== History ==
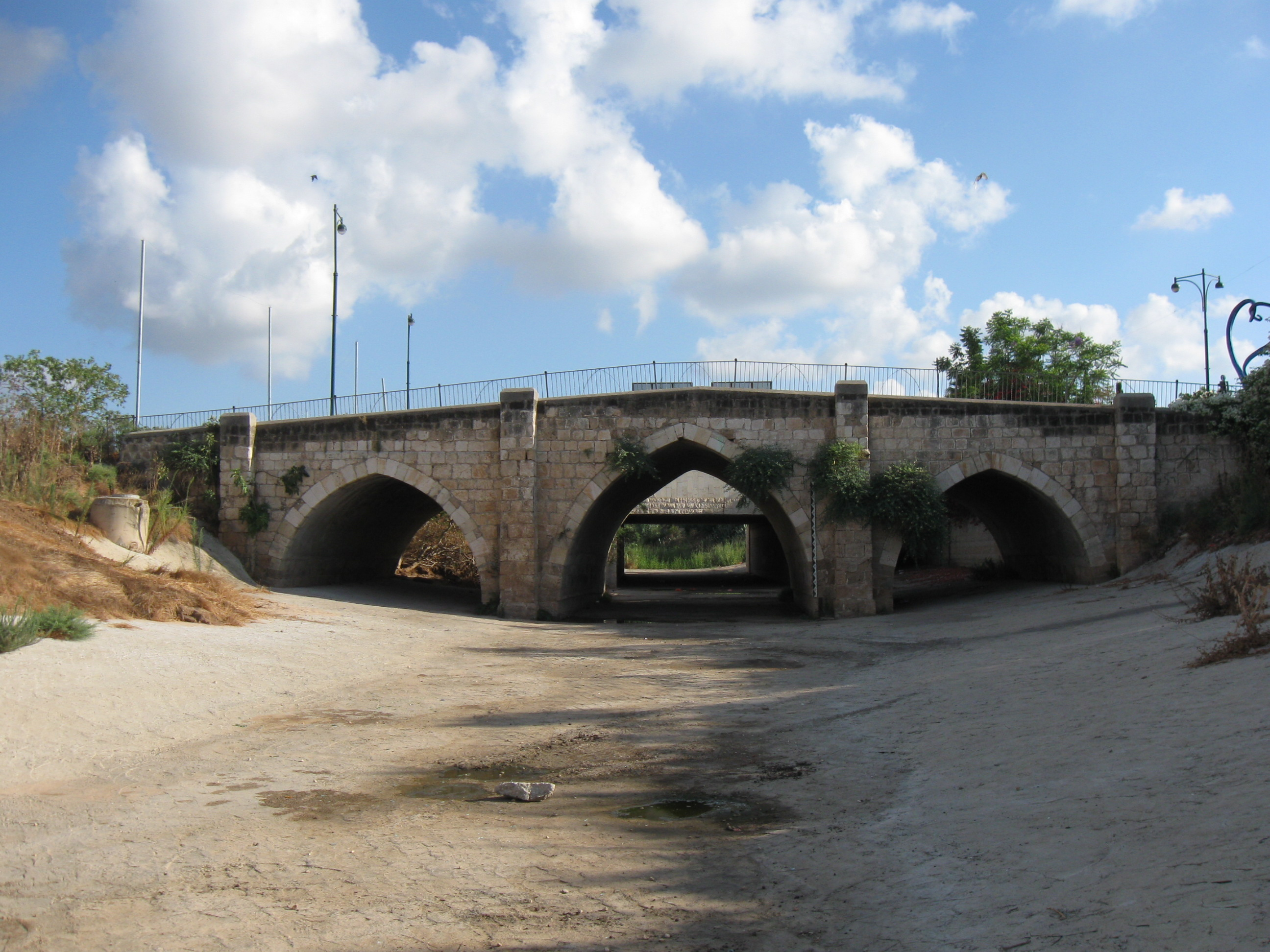
The downstream-facing side of the bridge in 2010

The bridge was one in a series of bridges built by Sultan Baybars in Egypt and Palestine. It was first studied in modern times by Clermont-Ganneau, who noted that an Arabic chronicle had referred to the construction by Baybars in 672 AH of two bridges build of a significant nature "in the neighbourhood of Ramleh". The chief purpose of these bridges was to ease communication for his armies between Egypt and northern Syria. The second of these two bridges is thought to be the Jisr Jindas.

According to Clermont-Ganneau, the bridge was built in 671–672 AH (1273–1274). The Archaeology of Society in the Holy Land cites the completion date as 1273.

Max van Berchem, who examined it in the late 19th century, found that the bridge contained large amount of reused Crusader masonry, some of which carried mason's marks.

== Description ==
The bridge is 48 metres (157 ft) long, and 11.5 metres (38 ft) wide. It comprises three arches, two central piers with triangular upstream-facing cutwaters and downstream-facing buttresses with sloping cills.

It is very similar in design to the more well-known Jisr Jindas, apart from the width of the piers. The bridge has a more than 2:1 arch-span to pier-width ratio versus approximately 1:1 at Jisr Jindas.

The bridge does not contain any decoration or inscriptions, similar to that found on Jisr Jindas. However, according to Andrew Petersen there is "a possible inscription or signature" on a stone at the south end.

== See also ==
- Barid, Muslim postal network renewed during Mamluk period (roads, bridges, khans)
  - Jisr al-Ghajar, stone bridge south of Ghajar
  - Daughters of Jacob Bridge (Jisr Banat Yaqub), Mamluk bridge on the upper Jordan River
  - Al-Sinnabra Crusader bridge, with nearby Jisr Umm el-Qanatir/Jisr Semakh and Jisr es-Sidd further downstream
  - Jisr el-Majami bridge over the Jordan, with Mamluk khan
  - Jisr Jindas bridge over the Ayalon near Lydda and Ramla
  - Isdud Bridge (Mamluk, 13th century) outside Ashdod/Isdud
  - Jisr ed-Damiye, bridges over the Jordan (Roman, Mamluk, modern)

== Bibliography ==
- Clermont-Ganneau, C.S. (1896). [ARP] Archaeological Researches in Palestine 1873–1874, translated from the French by J. McFarlane. Vol. 2. London: Palestine Exploration Fund.
- Levy, T.E. (1995). Archaeology of Society in the Holy Land. A&C Black. ISBN 0718513886.
- Meinecke, M. (1992). Die mamlukishe Architecktur in Agypten und Syrien. Vol. 2. Gluckstadt.
- Petersen, Andrew (2001). A Gazetteer of Buildings in Muslim Palestine: Volume I (British Academy Monographs in Archaeology). Oxford University Press. ISBN 9780197270110.
- Petersen, A. (2010): Bridges in Medieval Palestine, in U. Vermeulen & K. Dhulster (eds.), History of Egypt & Syria in the Fatimid, Ayyubid & Mamluk Eras V Archived 2016-06-04 at the Wayback Machine, V. Peeters, Leuven
