= Night of the Bridges =

Haganah operation against the British in Mandatory Palestine, June 1946

Operation Markolet
- Part of Jewish insurgency in Mandatory Palestine
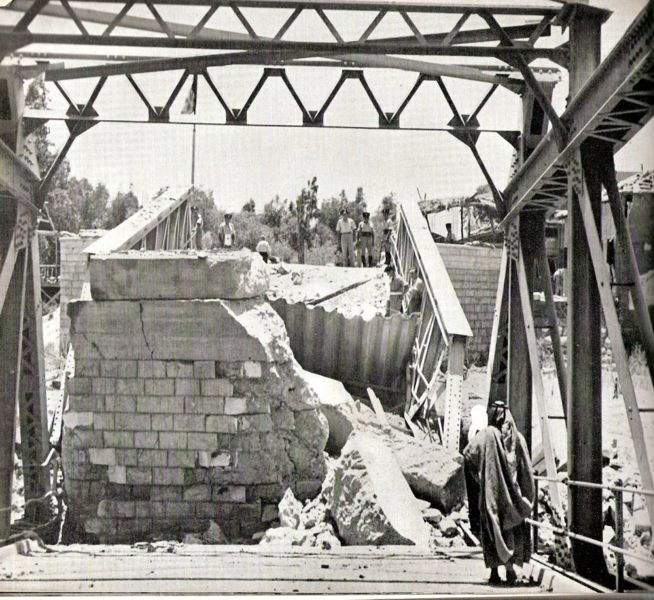
- Allenby Bridge after its destruction by the Palmach, 1946
- Location: Mandatory Palestine
- Planned: January–February 1946
- Planned by: Haganah
- Target: Bridges to Lebanon, Syria, Jordan, and Kingdom of Egypt
- Objective: Destroy bridges linking Mandatory Palestine to neighboring countries
- Date: 16 June 1946–17 June 1946
- Executed by: Palmach
- Casualties: 15 (14 Palmach members, 1 British Royal Engineer) killed 5 Palmach members injured

The Night of the Bridges (formally Operation Markolet) was a Haganah venture on the night of 16 to 17 June 1946 in the British Mandate of Palestine, as part of the Jewish insurgency in Palestine (1944–47). Its aim was to destroy eleven bridges linking Mandatory Palestine to the neighboring countries Lebanon, Syria, Transjordan and Egypt, in order to suspend the transportation routes used by the British Army. Attacks on a further three bridges had been considered, but were not executed.

Only one operation failed: the Palmach, the elite fighting force of the Haganah, suffered 14 killed and 5 injured at the Nahal Akhziv bridges, after the group was spotted by Arabs working for the British, who opened fire on them and prematurely detonated the explosives. The other operations succeeded without injuries. One British Royal Engineer was killed while trying to defuse an undetonated bomb the following day.

To disguise and protect the real operations and to confuse the British forces, around 50 diversionary operations and ambushes were carried out throughout the country on the same night. The confusion also allowed the Palmach members to escape more easily after completion of the operations.

== Preparations ==
The Haganah started the preparations in January–February 1946. First, the SHAI (Haganah Intelligence Service), Palmach patrols and forces scheduled to carry out the operation began spotting, photographing and measuring the targets but also exploring possible access and escape paths. They were disguised as lovers enjoying nature or as people on geography excursions.

Originally, the operation should have taken place in May, but due to political reasons it was postponed.

The political leadership forbade an attack on four targets: the railway bridge between the Ras an-Nakura tunnels, and the three bridges over the Jordan and Yarmuk Rivers leading to the Naharayim power plant.

=== Spared bridges ===
To country	Bridge	Reason	Type	Coordinates
Lebanon	Bridge between Ras an-Nakura tunnels, Ras an-Nakura (Rosh HaNikra)	Restoring the tunnel would be too difficult and it was within Lebanon	railway	33°05′41″N 35°06′16″E
Jordan	Over the Yarmuk, near Gesher	Led to the power station in Naharayim	railway	32°38′42″N 35°34′22″E
Jordan	Jisr Majami over the Jordan, near Gesher	Led to the power station in Naharayim	railway	32°38′06″N 35°33′57″E

== Attacks ==
=== Objectives ===
The planners knew that the operation could not cause heavy damage, and that it would only take some weeks for the connections to be restored. The real targets were:

- demonstration of the ability of the Haganah to operate throughout the country, even in deserted areas or at the center of the Arab population
- demonstration of the ability to sabotage the British Army's operations
- demonstration of the ability of the Haganah to discourage neighboring armies from future involvement
- harming the British Army's prestige as the most powerful force in the Middle East and damaging the legitimacy of the British Mandate
- strengthening and encouraging the Jewish population in Palestine, and showing the Haganah as being as active as the Irgun and Lehi groups

=== Outcome ===
The objectives were fully achieved. The Haganah could hit multiple strategic targets at the same time. As a precaution, the Syrian, Lebanese and Trans-Jordanian armies were put on standby, and the borders were tightened. The British Mandate suffered estimated financial damage of 250,000 pounds sterling.

==== Targeted bridges ====
To country	Bridge	details	type	coordinates
Lebanon	Over Ayun Stream, at Metula	was unguarded	road	33°17′0″N 35°34′52″E
Lebanon	NW of Metula	executed discreetly	road	33°17′14″N 35°33′58″E
Lebanon	Over Nahal Kziv	forces were spotted, explosives were laid under fire, operation failed, 14 dead and 5 injured	railway	33°03′02″N 35°06′11.5″E
Lebanon	Over Nahal Kziv	called off following the heavy casualties taken during the attack on the nearby railway bridge	road	33°03′02″N 35°06′15.5″E
Syria	Daughters of Jacob/Bnot Ya'akov Bridge	executed discreetly	road	33°0′37″N 35°37′42″E
Syria	Over the Yarmuk	was unguarded; never repaired since	railway	32°40′47″N 35°38′58″E
Jordan	Sheikh Hussein Bridge over the Jordan	executed discreetly	road	32°29′49″N 35°34′32″E
Jordan	Damiya Bridge (Adam) over the Jordan	executed discreetly	road	32°06′10″N 35°32′06″E
Jordan	Allenby Bridge over the Jordan	forces were spotted, explosives were laid under fire	road	31°52′28″N 35°32′26″E
(Kingdom of Egypt) Egypt	Over Besor Stream, Gaza	forces were spotted, explosives were laid under fire	road	31°27′20″N 34°24′53″E
(Kingdom of Egypt) Egypt	Over Besor Stream, Gaza	forces were spotted, explosives were laid under fire	railway	31°27′27″N 34°24′44″E

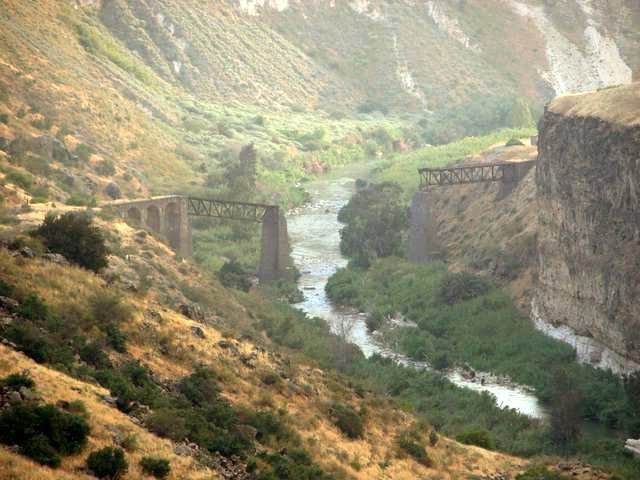
Yarmouk bridge ruins.

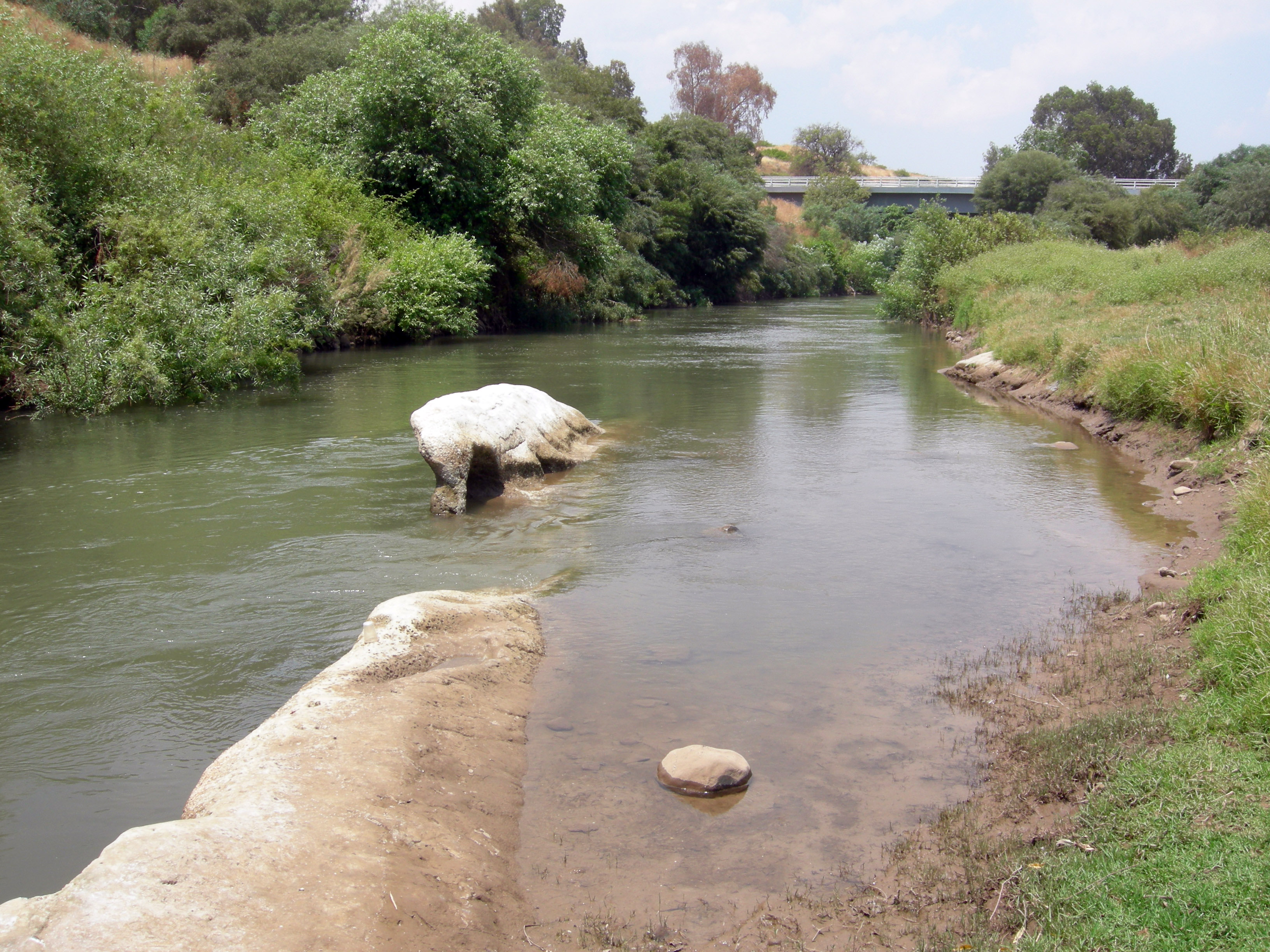
Bridge of the Daughters of Jacob/Bnot Ya'akov in May 2009.

== Reaction ==
Twelve days later, on 29 June 1946, partly in response to the bridge bombings, the British launched Operation Agatha, whose main goal was to suppress the state of anarchy in Palestine by capturing the most militant Zionists. Numbers for involved British personal varies between 10,000, 17,000 and 25,000. During that surprise action, around 2,700 Jews were arrested, including the senior leadership of the Haganah. The British obtained documentary evidence of Jewish Agency involvement in paramilitary acts and collusion between the Haganah and the more violent groups, Irgun and Lehi.

== Collaboration of British politicians ==
In his book Publish It Not: The Middle East Cover-up, Christopher Mayhew recounted the collaboration of Labour MPs Richard Crossman and John Strachey in the attack:

"One day, Crossman, now in the House of Commons, came to see Strachey … [Crossman] had heard from his friends in the Jewish Agency that they were contemplating an act of sabotage … Should this be done, or should it not? Few would be killed … Crossman asked Strachey for his advice … The next day in the smoking room at the House of Commons, Strachey gave his approval to Crossman. The Haganah went ahead and blew up all the bridges over the [River] Jordan."
