= Damiyah Bridge =

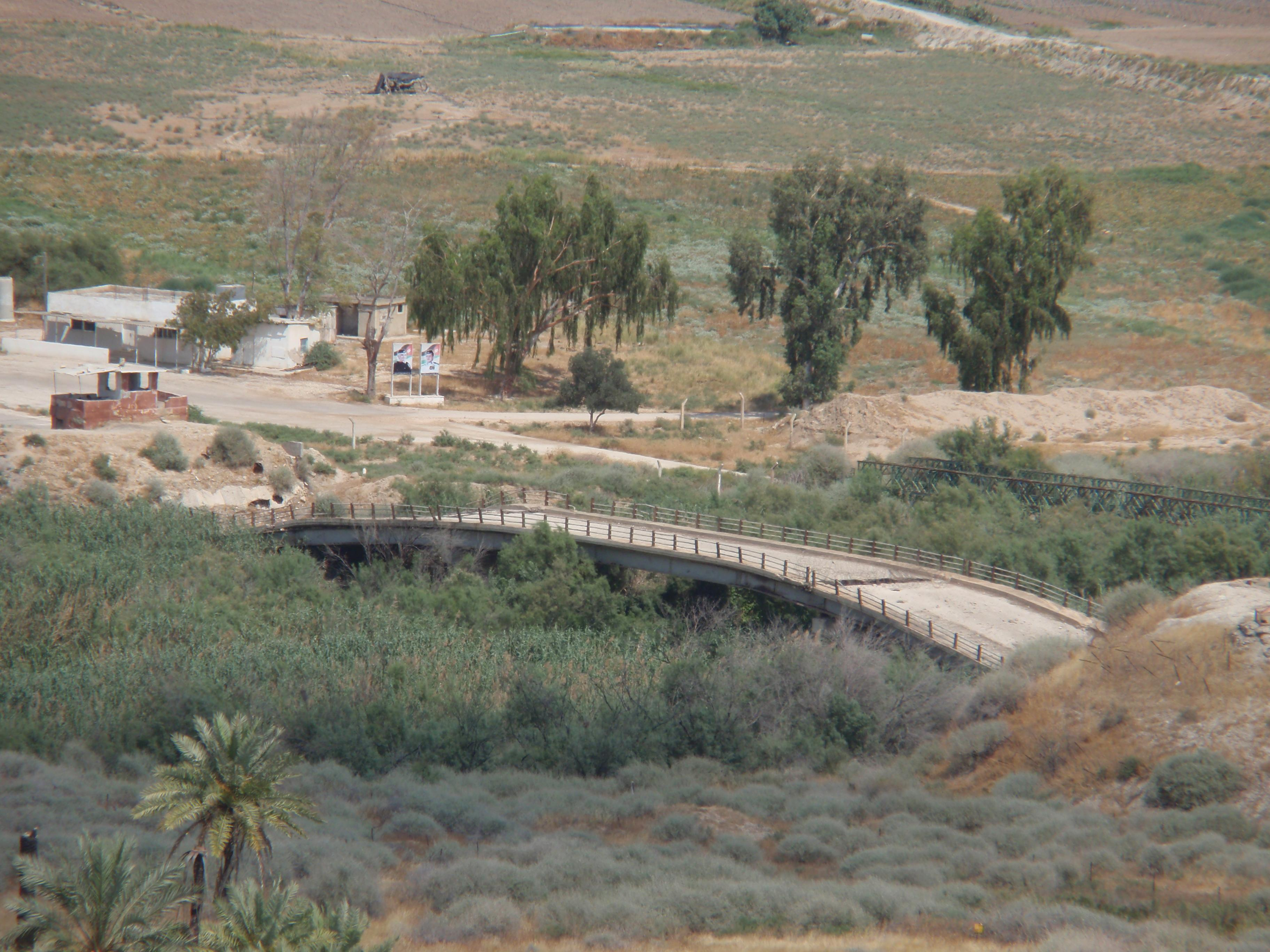
- Looking from the West Bank to Jordan
- Coordinates: 32°06′10″N 35°32′07″E
- Crosses: Jordan River
- Locale: Palestinian territories and Jordan
- Official name: Jisr ed-Damiye

Characteristics
- Design: Arch

History
- Opened: Roman period

Location
- Interactive map of Damiyah Bridge

The Damiyah Bridge (Arabic: جسر الدامية, romanized: Jisr ed-Damieh, lit. 'Bridge of ed-Damieh'), known as Prince Muhammad Bridge in Jordan, and as Gesher Adam (Hebrew: גשר אדם, lit. 'Adam Bridge') in Israel, is a historical bridge that crosses the Jordan River and located between the Palestinian territories and the town of Damia in the Balqa Governorate in Jordan.

In 1918, during the Sinai and Palestine Campaign of the First World War, it was captured by Imperial British forces. At the time it was used as part of the Nablus – Es Salt – Amman road.

After 1991 it was used only for goods transported by truck between Israel, the West Bank and Jordan until its closure for security reasons sometime between 2002 and 2005 during the Second Intifada. As of 2014, the Israeli side is part of a closed military area.

== Etymology ==
The Hebrew Bible mentions a town called Adam near Zaretan in the Jordan Valley (Joshua 3:16).

Most scholars identify nearby Tall Damiyah, called by some Tel Adam in Modern Hebrew, with the historical and biblical city of Adama, with the US-American biblical scholar William F. Albright offering the theory that Adama/Admah and Adam are one and the same.

The Arabic name is spelled variously as Damiye, Damieh, Damia, etc., with or without the definitive article (spelled either al-, el-, ad-, ed-).

== History ==
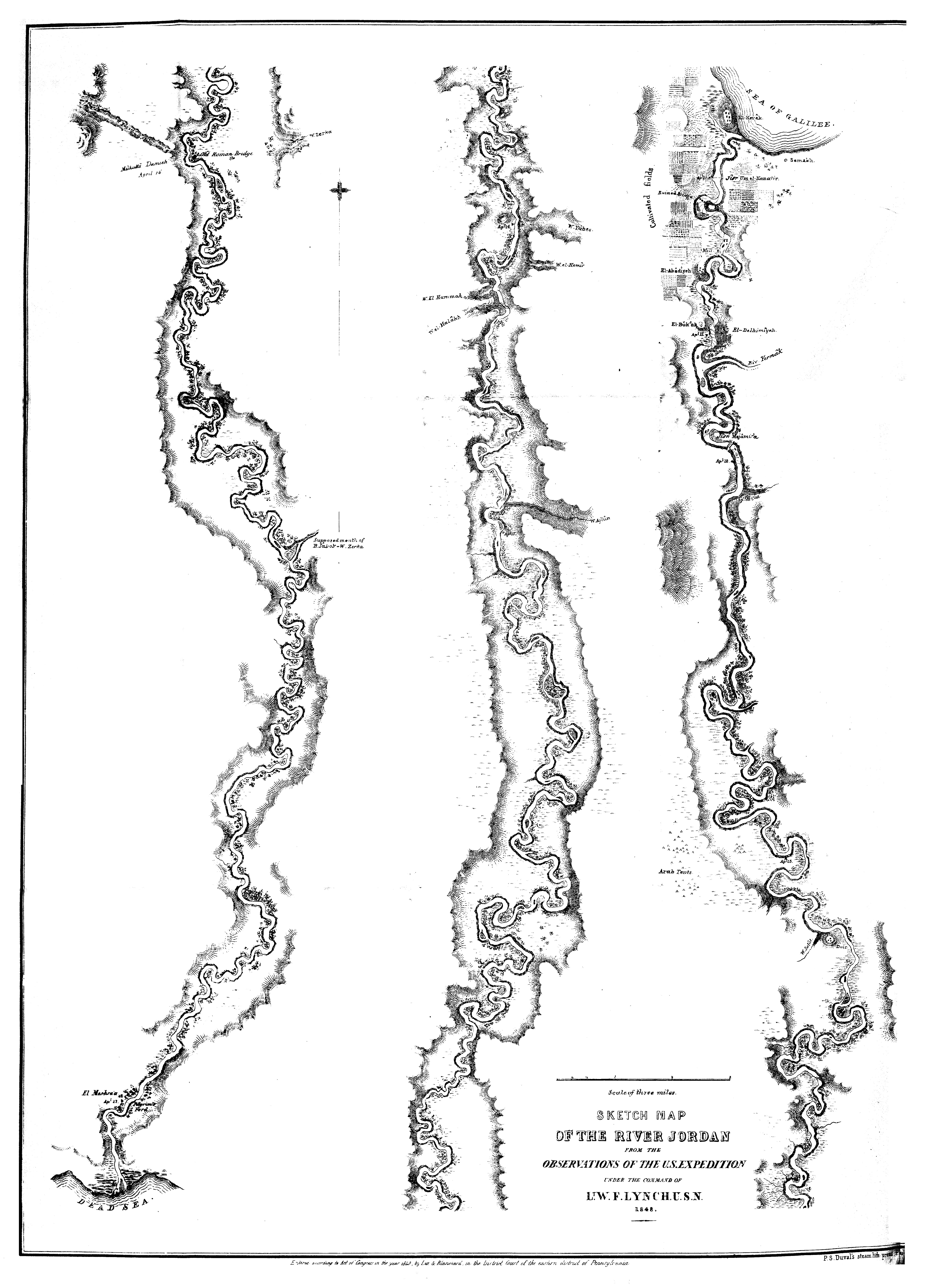
1849 William F. Lynch map of the Jordan River showing Jisr ed Damiye ("Old Roman Bridge") as well as Jisr el-Majami.

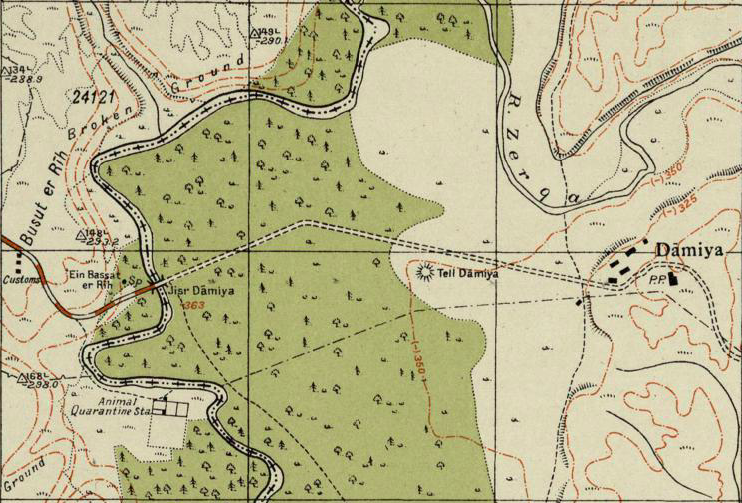
1940s Survey of Palestine map of the bridge

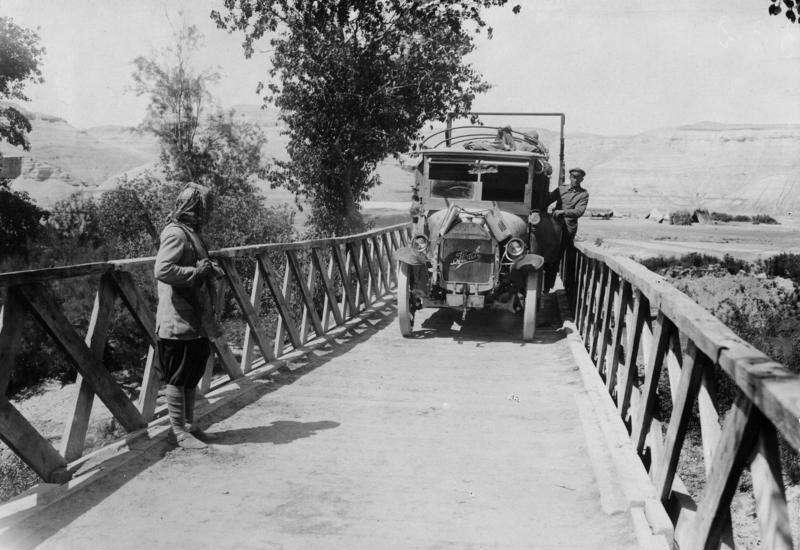
German military truck crossing the bridge in March 1917

The bridge was used as a crossing between the west and east banks of the Jordan due to good access in both directions over the Far'a/Tirzah Valley to the west and the Zarqa/Yabbok Valley to the east.

In 1849, William F. Lynch described the ruins of the old bridge as "a Roman bridge spanning a dry bed, once, perhaps, the main channel of the Jordan, now diverted in its course. The bridge was of Roman construction, with one arch entire, except a longitudinal fissure on the top, and the ruins of two others, one of them at right angles with the main arch, probably for a mill-sluice. The span of the main arch was fifteen feet; the height, from the bed of the stream to the keystone, twenty feet."

Still visible are ruins of several consecutive bridges: the stone bridge built by the Mamluk sultan Baibars in the 13th century, blown up by Haganah forces during Operation Markolet (known as the Night of the bridges) on the night of 16–17 June 1946; a British bridge built soon after, and a Jordanian one from the 1950s, both destroyed by the Israeli army during the Six-Day War in 1967. Right after the war, in August 1967, Israeli Minister of Defense Moshe Dayan allowed the uncontrolled traffic of goods between the Palestinians and Jordan using the ford of Damiya, as a way of avoiding the economic collapse of the West Bank and for avoiding Palestinian discontent, since the Israeli markets were not open yet to Palestinian produce. This was an element of what became known as the "policy of the open bridges".

In January 1968, Jordan built a prefabricated metal bridge to facilitate the trade connections to the West Bank. The bridge was open to both goods and people, but fighting due to the War of Attrition led to the 1968 Battle of Karameh during which the bridge was damaged by Jordanian artillery who tried to prevent Israeli armour from passing. In 1969, the Jordanians blew up parts of this bridge, but it was repaired at some later point. During the Jordanian Civil War (better known as Black September) in 1970, the bridge was again closed for several days during the fighting between the Palestinians and the Jordanian Army. The Jordanians repaired the bridge in early 1975 after it had been damaged by floods, and performed some amendments in 1976. The Jordanian metal bridge still stands but is currently out of use. In 2014, Palestinian authorities were negotiating with Jordan the possibilities of reopening traffic between the two sides.

== See also ==
- List of Roman bridges
- Allenby Bridge
- Barid, Muslim postal network renewed during Mamluk period (roads, bridges, khans)
  - Jisr al-Ghajar, stone bridge south of Ghajar
  - Daughters of Jacob Bridge (Jisr Banat Yaqub), Mamluk bridge on the upper Jordan River
  - Al-Sinnabra Crusader bridge, with nearby Jisr Umm el-Qanatir/Jisr Semakh and Jisr es-Sidd further downstream
  - Jisr el-Majami bridge over the Jordan, with Mamluk khan
  - Jisr Jindas, Mamluk bridge over the Ayalon near Lod and Ramla, Israel
  - Yibna Bridge or "Nahr Rubin Bridge"
  - Isdud Bridge (Mamluk, 13th century) outside Ashdod/Isdud
