= Gesher, Israel =

Gesher: גשר (Hebrew)
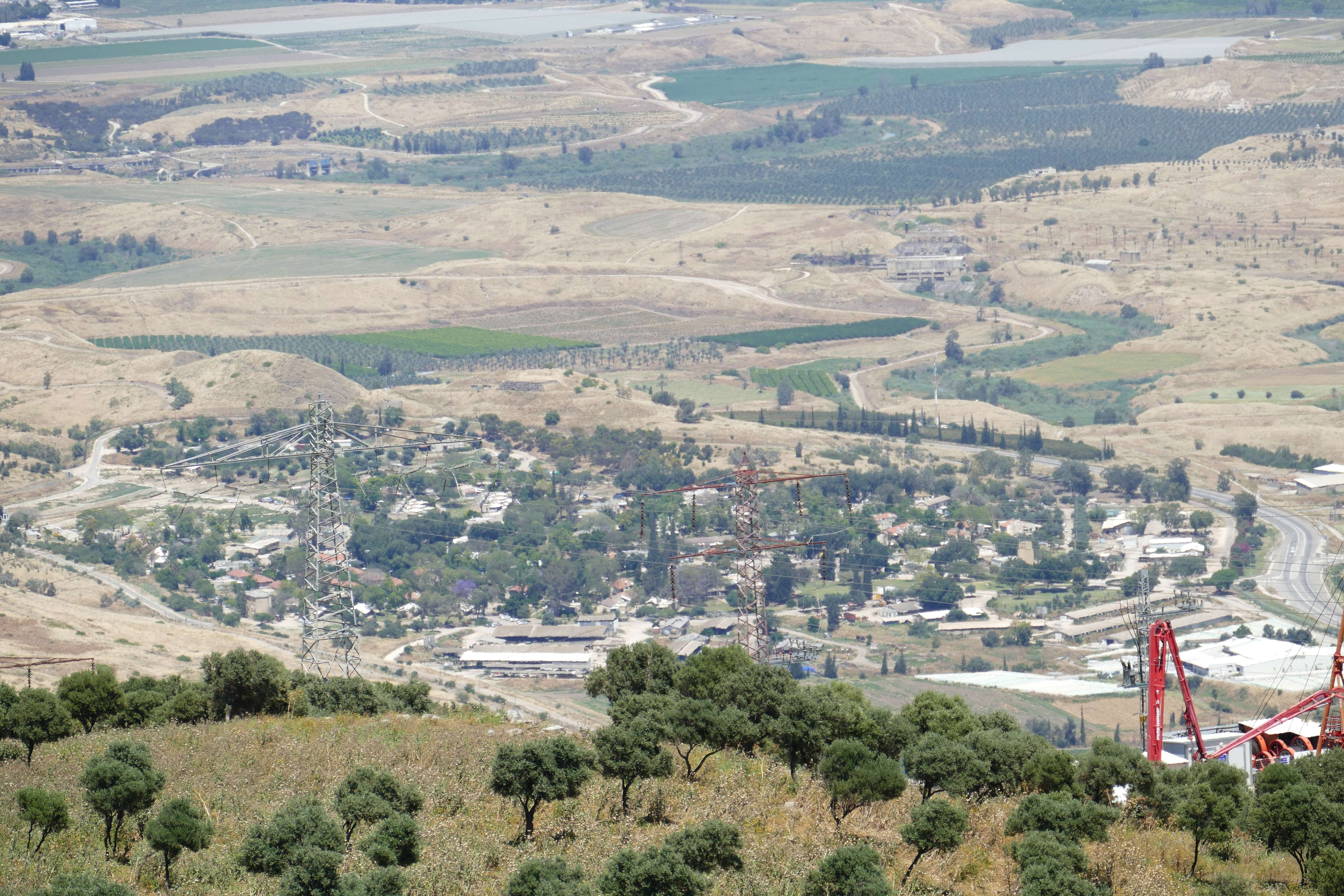
- Etymology: Bridge
- Location within Northeast Israel Location within Israel
- Coordinates: 32°37′17″N 35°33′8″E
- Country: Israel
- District: Northern
- Subdistrict: Jezreel
- Council: Valley of Springs
- Affiliation: Kibbutz Movement
- Founded: 1939
- Founder: Noar Oved and Jewish refugees from Germany.
- Population (2024): 458
- Website: www.gesher.org.il

Gesher (Hebrew: גשר, lit. 'Bridge') is a kibbutz in the Beit She'an Valley in northeastern Israel. Founded in 1939 by Jewish refugees from Germany, it falls under the jurisdiction of Valley of Springs Regional Council. It is situated 10 km south of kibbutz Deganya Aleph and 15 km south of Tiberias. In 2024 it had a population of 458.

It is named after the neighbouring Roman bridge over the Jordan River ("gesher" means bridge in Hebrew), known as Jisr Majami, 1 km to the east in what is now known as the Naharayim area. The original site of the kibbutz, depopulated during the 1948 war, known as Old Gesher, was located immediately north of the old Roman bridge.

== History ==
=== Khan and Palestinian village ===
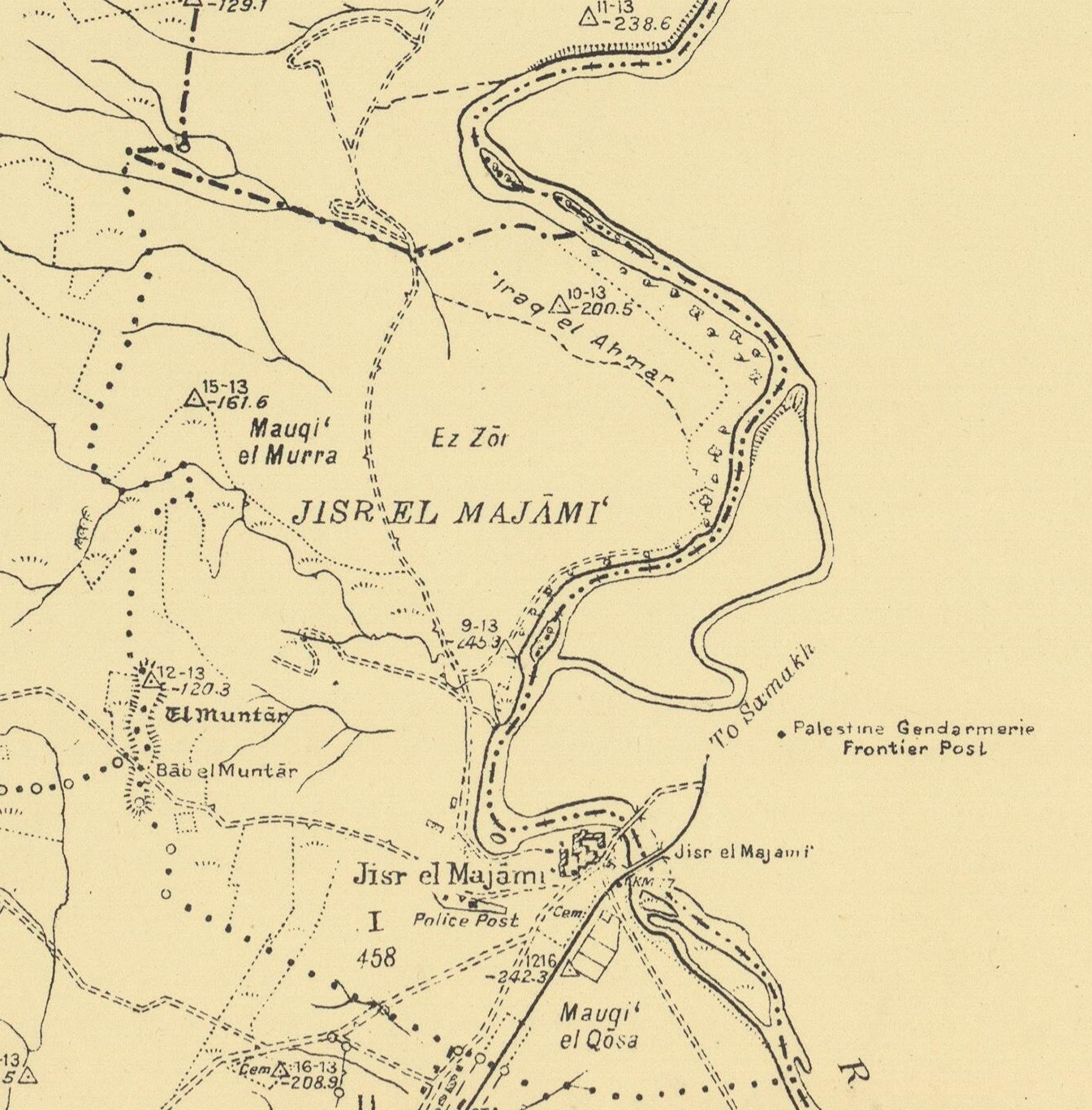
1928 Survey of Palestine map of the Jisr el Majami "village boundary" area

The original site of the kibbutz – 1 km east of its current location – was originally a khan or caravanserai built around 1365, active from the Mamluk period to the early 19th century. Situated right next to the west end of Jisr Majami ("bridge of the meeting"), it was one of the earliest khans in the Galilee and was a major crossroads where the north–south Bet She'an–Damascus road intersected the east–west road which led from Gilead through the Sirin Plateau. There are three bridges at the site—a Byzantine stone bridge (the above-mentioned Jisr el-Majami), an Ottoman railroad bridge serving the Haifa–Dera'a segment of the Hejaz Railway, and a British Mandate road bridge serving the Haifa–Baghdad highway.

A small settlement in the caravanserai existed until the early 20th century, in the 1922 census of Palestine, conducted by the British Mandate authorities, Jisr al Majami had a population of 121; 112 Muslims, 4 Jews and 5 Christians, where all the Christians were of the Orthodox faith. Following the building of the Rutenberg hydroelectric power plant, the population had totally changed in the 1931 census to a total of 320; 3 Muslim, 316 Jewish and 3 Christian, in a total of in 43 houses.

In 1939, Kibbutz Gesher was founded next to the ancient bridge (see below).

In 1945, Jisr al Majami had 250 inhabitants; 230 Jews, 10 Muslims and 10 Christians, and the total land area was 458 dunams. A total of 15 dunums were used for citrus and bananas, 274 dunums were used for cereals, while 169 dunams were classified as uncultivable land.

Some of the original kibbutz buildings lay within the khan ruins.

=== 1939 foundation and 1948 evacuation ===
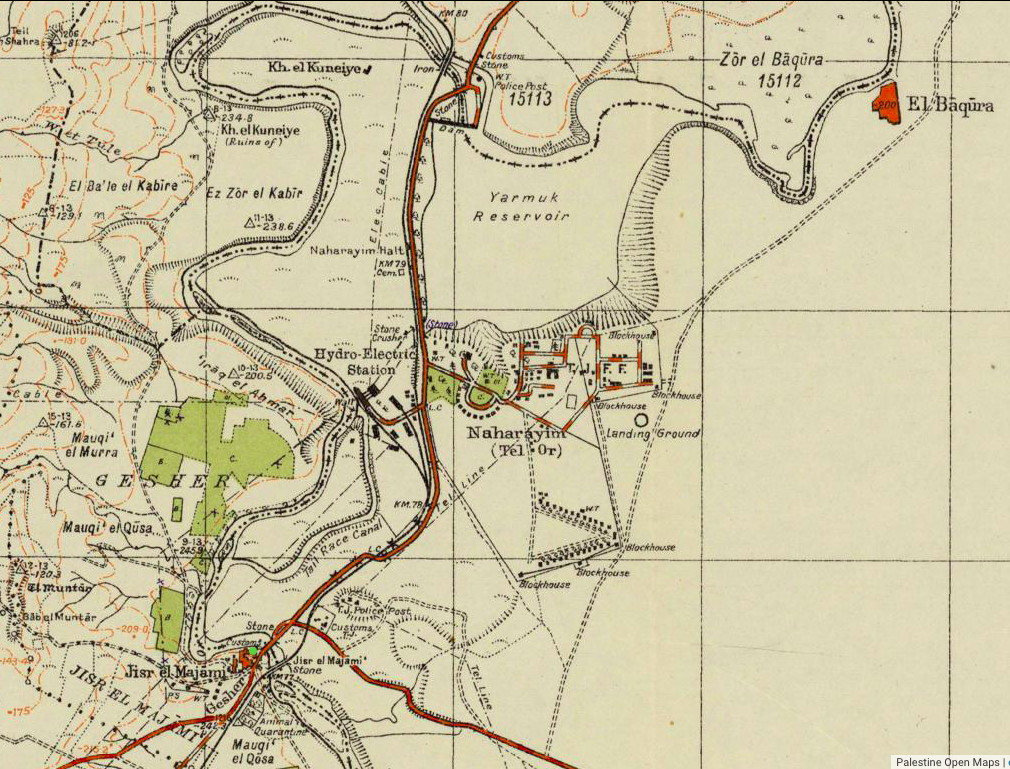
1942 Survey of Palestine map of the area: the northern part of the area had been renamed as "Gesher"

The kibbutz was founded in 1939 on lands bought with the help of Edmond de Rothschild, by a group of Yishuv Jews, who were members of the youth movement HaNo'ar HaOved, and a group of young Jewish refugees from Germany. They were later joined by more Jewish immigrants from Poland, Germany, Austria and additional Palestinian Jews. The kibbutz grew up near the Naharayim bridge as a Tower and stockade settlement.

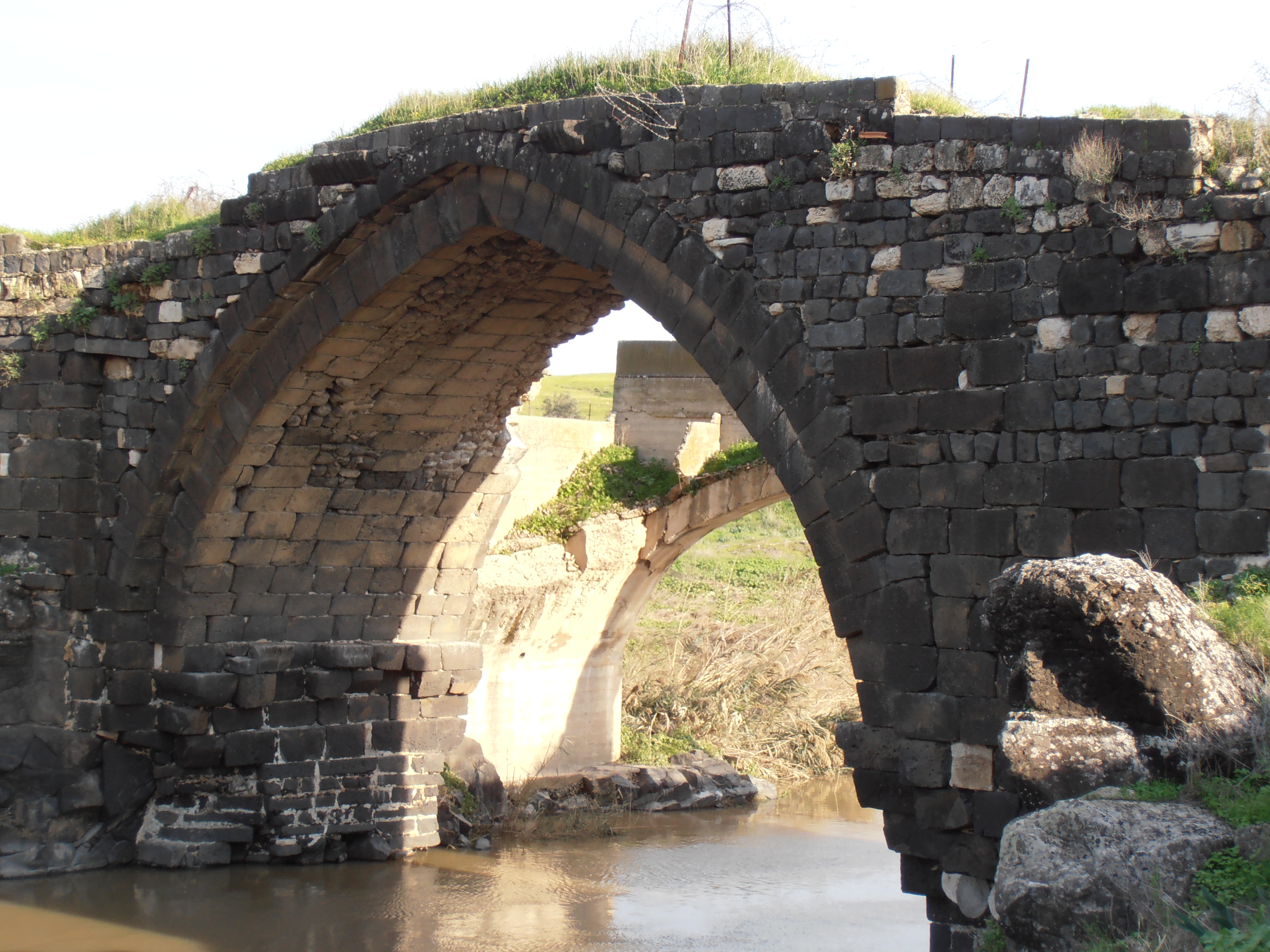
Jisr Majami

On 27 April 1948, the Haganah took control of the Gesher police station, a Tegart fort that had been evacuated by the British. The Arab Legion, still under British control at the time, ordered them to evacuate it. Haganah refused and both troops exchanged fire during 3 days until the Arab Legion was ordered by his HQ to return to their barracks.

In April–May 1948, 50 children of the kibbutz were evacuated to a 19th-century French monastery on the grounds of Rambam hospital in the Bat Galim neighborhood of Haifa, where they lived for 22 months. The building had been empty since 1933, when the Carmelite nuns had moved into their new monastery on the French Carmel.

For seven days, beginning on May 15, 1948, the kibbutz and Tegart fort were attacked by Iraqi forces using armored cars and aerial bombing. The defenders repulsed the Iraqis, inflicting heavy losses, but the kibbutz was destroyed during combat.

=== Current location ===
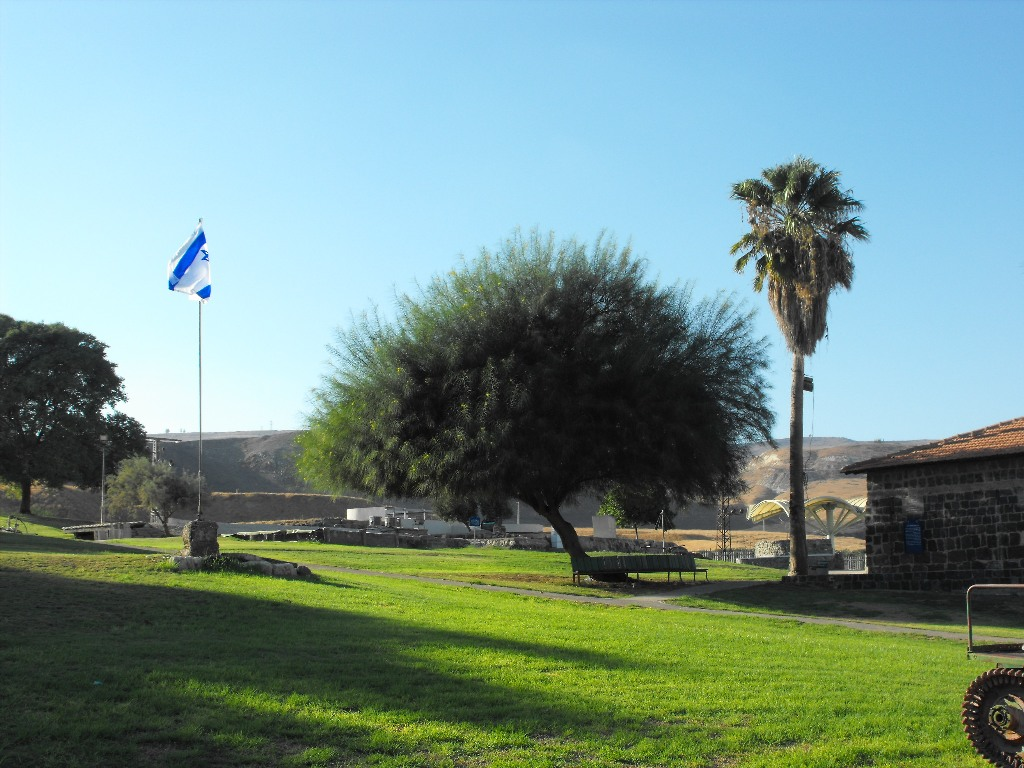
Kibbutz Gesher lawns

After the war, the kibbutz was rebuilt about 1 km to the west.

During the War of Attrition between 1967 and 1970 the kibbutz was attacked with bombs, mines and gunfire by PLO Arab Palestinian fighters. In the 1990s it underwent privatization while preserving the collective model in the areas of education, health, culture and leisure.

After the peace agreement between Israel and the Kingdom of Jordan, the kibbutz established a museum on the original site of the kibbutz that documents the history of Gesher and the Jewish-run power station of Naharayim.

== See also ==
- Gesher (archaeological site)
