= Moshe Sharon =

Israeli historian of Islam (born 1937)

- משה שרון
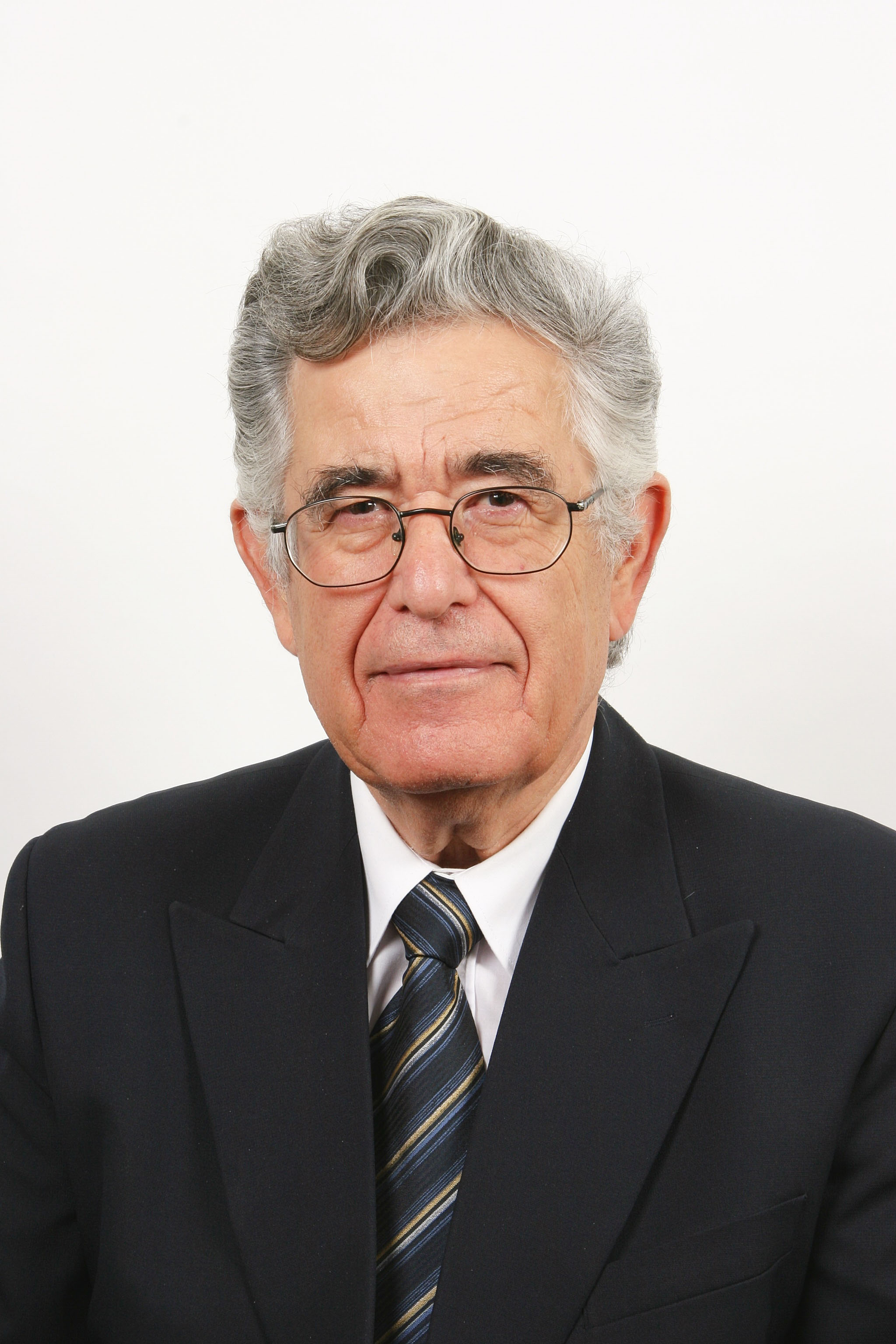
- Born: December 18, 1937 (age 88); Haifa, Mandatory Palestine
- Education: Hebrew University of Jerusalem
- Known for: History of Islam
- Scientific career
- Fields: History
- Workplaces: Bar-Ilan University; Hebrew University of Jerusalem
- Doctoral advisor: David Ayalon

Moshe Sharon (Hebrew: משה שָׁרוֹן; born December 18, 1937) is an Israeli historian of Islam.

He is currently Professor Emeritus of Islamic and Middle Eastern Studies at the Hebrew University of Jerusalem where he serves as Chair in Baháʼí Studies.

== Education, career, and private life ==
Sharon was born in Haifa in 1937. He joined the faculty of Hebrew University of Jerusalem in 1965 and would go on to earn a Ph.D. at the same institution in 1971. He served as an Arab Affairs adviser to Prime Minister Menachem Begin and served in the Ministry of Defense, during which he took part in the negotiations for peace with Egypt. Sharon established the Centre of Jewish Studies at the University of the Witwatersrand, which he directed while serving as director of the World Zionist Organization branch in Johannesburg. In 1999 he was appointed to the chair of Baháʼí Studies at Hebrew University. Sharon was elected to the American Philosophical Society in 2014. He serves as a policy expert for the Ariel Center for Policy Research. He and his wife, Judy, have six children.

== Research interests ==
Moshe Sharon has written about early Islamic history and the development of Shia Islam. He is a specialist in Arabic epigraphy and papyrology, with his opus being Corpus Inscriptionum Arabicarum Palaestinae. In 2005 he published the first translation into Hebrew of Kitáb-i-Aqdas, the holy book of the Baháʼí faith, and included a study of the history and theology of the religion.

== Beliefs and controversies ==
=== Baháʼí Faith ===
Moshe Sharon is interviewed in the 2007 Israeli documentary film, "Bahais in My Backyard." In the interview he states that the only Baháʼí academic chair in the world is in Israel due to his efforts in convincing Hebrew University to establish one and his efforts in finding a benefactor to fund the position. He also says that there are no descendants of Bahá'u'lláh in Israel. Despite Sharon's denial of the existence of such relatives, there are, in fact, dozens, and one of Bahá'u'lláh's great-granddaughters is featured in the film. Furthermore, even at the time of the interview, there were other Baháʼí academic chairs in existence, such as the ones established at Devi Ahilya Vishwavidyalaya, a state university in Madhya Pradesh in 1991 and at the University of Maryland in 1993.

=== Islam ===
Moshe Sharon believes that Western leaders fail to understand Islam. He says that "There is no fundamental Islam. There is only Islam full stop." Citing the conflict in Yugoslavia, Sharon continues that "Wherever you have Islam, you will have war. It grows out of the attitude of Islamic civilization." He further argues that not only is there "open war, but there's also war by infiltration."

=== Israeli–Palestinian conflict ===
Regarding the Israeli–Palestinian conflict, Moshe Sharon has said that there is "no possibility of peace between Israel and the Palestinians whatsoever, for ever", believing that "Islam forbids it", and that peace agreements with Arabs are "pieces of paper, parts of tactics, strategies... with no meaning." He opposed the Oslo peace accords, describing them as "the root cause of all evil", and believes the dismantling the Israeli settlements, which he terms "expulsions," serve to "increase the appetite of the other side and only achieve the killing of Jews." He has also said that Jews and Arabs "living side by side in the same buildings and neighborhoods in the mixed cities has not proved itself, as it simply endangers the lives of the Jews living there." Sharon has also claimed there is no fundamental difference between Hamas, the PLO/Fatah, and the Palestinian Authority.

=== Iran ===
Moshe Sharon said in an interview that "The only way to avoid military confrontation with Iran is to leave this military confrontation to powers bigger than Israel."

== Books ==
- Judaism, Christianity, and Islam: Interaction and Conflict, 1989
- Revolt: The Social and Military Aspects of the Abbasid Revolution: Black Banners from the East II, 1990
- Judaism in the Context of Diverse Civilizations, 1993
- Editor, The Holy Land in History and Thought: Papers Submitted to the International Conference on the Relations Between the Holy Land and the World Outside It, 1997
- Sharon, Moshe (1997). Corpus Inscriptionum Arabicarum Palaestinae, A. Vol. 1. BRILL. ISBN 90-04-10833-5.
- Sharon, Moshe (1999). Corpus Inscriptionum Arabicarum Palaestinae, B-C. Vol. 2. BRILL. ISBN 90-04-11083-6.
- Sharon, Moshe (2004). Corpus Inscriptionum Arabicarum Palaestinae, D-F. Vol. 3. BRILL. ISBN 90-04-13197-3.
- Sharon, Moshe (2007). Corpus Inscriptionum Arabicarum Palaestinae, Addendum. BRILL. ISBN 978-90-04-15780-4.
- Sharon, Moshe (2009). Corpus Inscriptionum Arabicarum Palaestinae, G. Vol. 4. BRILL. ISBN 978-90-04-17085-8.
- Sharon, Moshe (2013). Corpus Inscriptionum Arabicarum Palaestinae, H-I. Vol. 5. BRILL. ISBN 978-90-04-25097-0.
- Sharon, Moshe (2016). Corpus Inscriptionum Arabicarum Palaestinae, J (I). Vol. 6. BRILL. ISBN 978-90-04-32479-4.
- Sharon, Moshe (2021). Corpus Inscriptionum Arabicarum Palaestinae, J (2) Jerusalem 1. Vol. 7. Brill. ISBN 978-90-04-44013-5.
- Sharon, Moshe, ed. (2004). Studies in Modern Religions, Religious Movements and the Bābī-Bahā'ī Faiths. Numen Book Series: Studies in the History of Religions. Vol. CIV. Leiden: Brill. ISBN 90-04-13904-4.
