= Battle of Nitzanim =

1948 battle of the Arab–Israeli War

- Part of the 1948 Arab–Israeli War
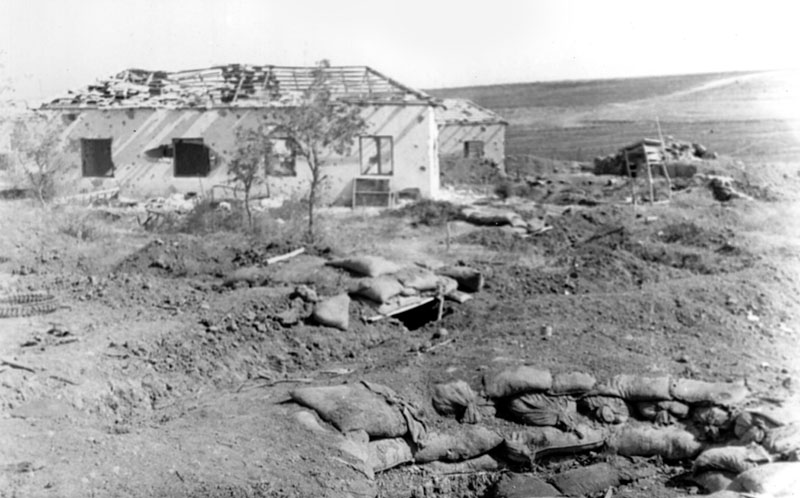
- Nitzanim after the Egyptian bombardment.
Date	June 6–10, 1948
Location	Nitzanim, Former British Mandate of Palestine 31°43′3″N 34°38′8″E
Result	Egyptian victory

Belligerents
Israel	Egypt

Commanders and leaders
(Israel) Avraham Schwarzstein (Israel) Yitzhak Pundak (53rd Battalion) (Israel) Shimon Avidan (Givati Brigade)	(Kingdom of Egypt) Ahmed Ali al-Mwawi (Kingdom of Egypt) Muhammad Naguib

Strength
74 soldiers 67 local paramilitaries 1 mortar 1 infantry company (Hill 69)	1 reinforced infantry battalion 1 armoured platoon 18 field guns 12 anti-tank guns

Casualties and losses
33 killed 26 wounded 105 captured 20 killed (on Hill 69)	Unknown
- Location within Mandatory Palestine

The Battle of Nitzanim was fought between the Israel Defense Forces and the Egyptian Army in the 1948 Arab–Israeli War, on June 7, 1948 (29 Iyar, 5708 in the Hebrew calendar). It was the first major Egyptian victory of the war, and one of the few cases of Israeli surrender.

The battle began on the night of June 6–7 with an artillery bombardment of Nitzanim, followed by an aerial bombardment and armored and infantry attacks. The main attack broke through the Israeli defenses at around 11:00; the Israelis retreated to a second position, and finally to a third position at 14:00. At 16:00, 105 Israelis surrendered to the Egyptian Army. Between June 7 and 10, the Battle of Hill 69 was fought nearby. The hill was captured by the Egyptians after a disorganized Israeli retreat.

Israelis viewed the surrender of Nitzanim as a humiliation, especially after the Givati Brigade published a leaflet denouncing the defenders. The residents of Nitzanim demanded a probe into the battle, and one was conducted by the General Staff, siding with the residents and coming to the conclusion that surrender was justified.

== Background ==
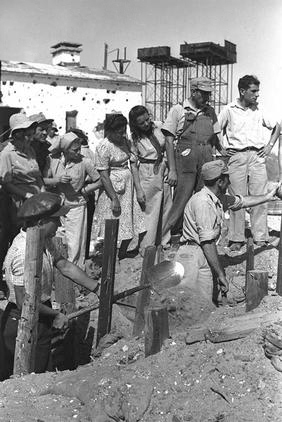
Givati troops in Nitzanim

Kibbutz Nitzanim, founded in 1943, was an isolated Israeli village on the coastal plain, enclosed by the Arab localities of Isdud in the north, Majdal in the south, and Julis and Beit Daras in the east. It was drawn inside the Arab state in the defunct United Nations Partition Plan for Palestine. As such, Nitzanim was isolated after December 31, 1947. It was attacked many times in the first six months of the 1947–1948 Civil War in Mandatory Palestine by local irregulars. The Jewish defenders used old Italian World War I rifles and managed to repel the attacks. In March 1948, Haganah forces from the headquarters in Be'er Tuvia broke through to the village, but on the way back were ambushed and the Haganah commander of Nitzanim, Shlomo Rubinstein, was killed in action. On March 26 and April 20, organized Arab attacks took place, and were repelled by the villagers. The Nitzanim collective was located 700 meters west of the coastal road. Its expanse, 800m long and 400m wide, did not allow for the formation of a second line of defense. The farmstead buildings were mostly built in a ravine surrounded by hills from all sides. To the north lied the "graveyard ridge", a convenient location for observations. Near it lay a wadi crater stretching west and allowing a convenient advance toward the farmstead from the north. To the east, the farmstead bordered a destroyed British camp, which allowed for an enemy advance right up to the farmstead fence. About two kilometers to the northeast was Hill 69, a position commanding the entire surrounding area.

At noon on May 29, an observation post near Nitzanim reported that an Egyptian column of about 150 vehicles had passed along the coastal road to the north. The post later reported that 500 vehicles, an entire brigade, had been counted. The observers were not trained in identifying military vehicles, and excitedly miscounted the vehicles passing. They exaggerated the numbers when they reported to the Givati Brigade. The Egyptian Army set up a position in Isdud between May 29 and June 1, for what Israelis presumed at the time to be thrust to capture Tel Aviv. However, the Egyptian advance stopped at the Ad Halom Bridge (over the Lakhish River to the north of Isdud), which had been destroyed by the Givati Brigade on May 12. As they made logistical preparations to cross the river, the column was bombed and engaged in Operation Pleshet (June 2–3). The Egyptians therefore shifted their focus to clearing their flanks, focusing on Nitzanim as some of the injured Israelis who participated in Pleshet were evacuated there. While the nearby village of Beit Daras had been under Israeli control since May 11, there was no continuity with Nitzanim, as Hill 69, which separated the two villages, was not occupied. The Givati Brigade planned to capture the hill on the night of June 7–8, but did not anticipate the Egyptian attack on Nitzanim. The plan to capture the hill, however, was carried out on time.

== Prelude ==
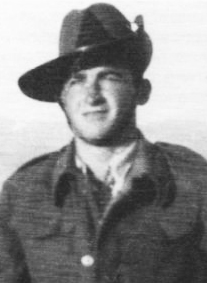
Avraham-Elkana Schwarzstein, the commander of Nitzanim

=== Israel ===
The evacuation of noncombatants, including children, was generally opposed by the Yishuv leadership. It was argued that Israel's aim in the war was the continuation of normal life and that under the circumstances, it was impossible to draw a line between front and rear. It was also feared that combatants would follow the noncombatants and abandon the settlements. Upon the Declaration of Independence on May, 15, this thinking was reversed. Operation Tinok ("Baby") saw the evacuation of children from Nitzanim, Negba, Gat, Gal-On and Kfar Menahem by armored cars or by foot to places further north, where they were considered to be relatively safer. On the night of May 16–17, 35 children from Nitzanim were evacuated on foot to Be'er Tuvia.

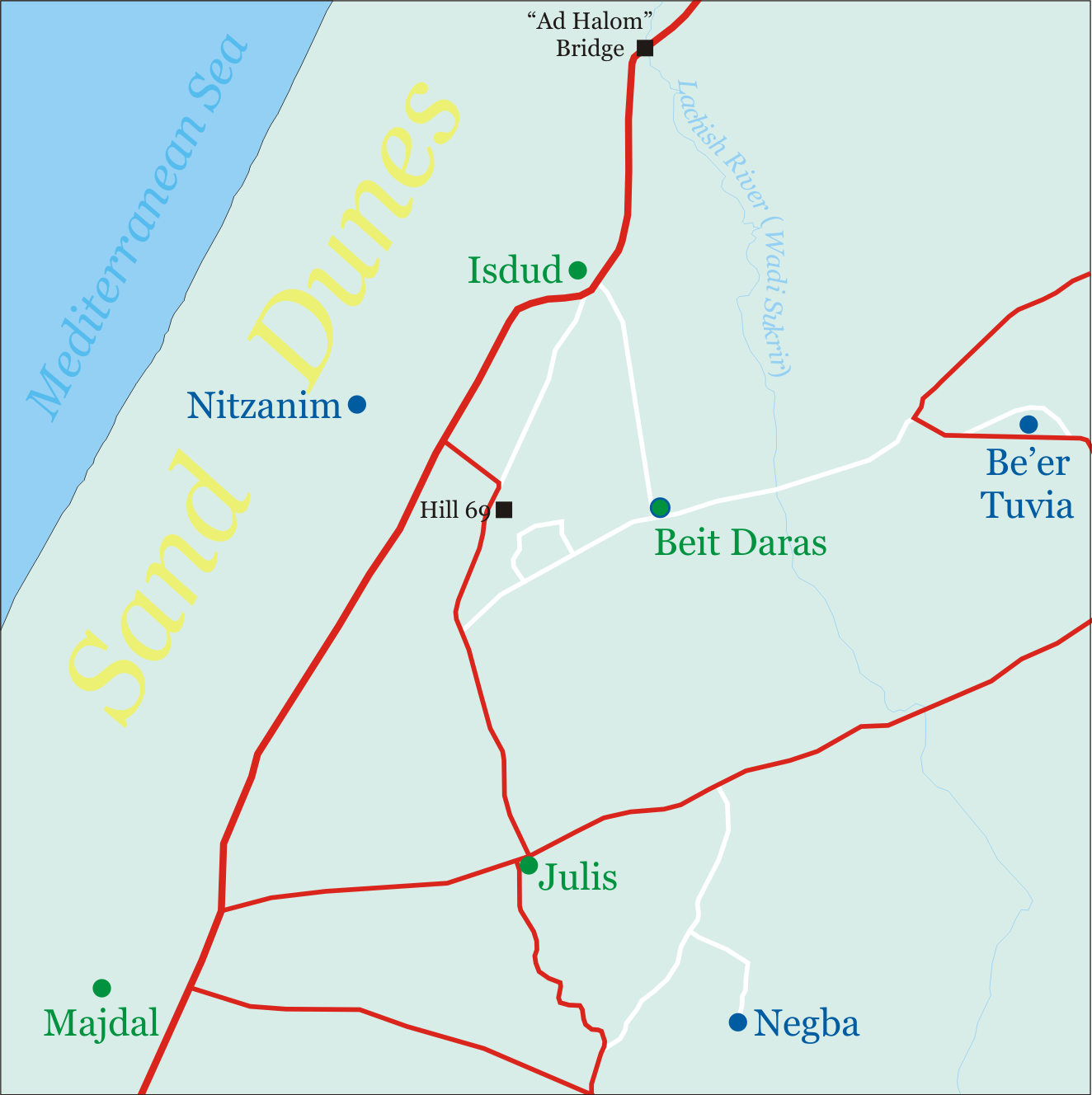
Orientation map

The Israeli defenders of Nitzanim consisted of two platoons from the Givati Brigade's 53rd Battalion, one of which was made up of new recruits, for a total of 74 soldiers. The recruits had been brought in from the reserve 58th Battalion during Operation Pleshet, in order to free up a more experienced platoon from Nitzanim for the operation. There were also 67 local paramilitaries, ten of them women, for a total of 141 combatants. The force had seventy rifles, thirty submachine guns, four Bren light machine guns, a 4-inch mortar, one PIAT and a few grenades. Nitzanim had three elevations: the highest was in the northeast, where water towers were built; in the center was the dining hall; and to the south was the "Palace"/"Mansion", an abandoned Arab house which was higher than its surroundings. The three elevations were surrounded by a ring of positions connected by a series of communication ditches. The local commander divided his force into fourteen positions, maintaining a reserve force for reinforcement of weak points and counterattacks in case the Egyptians broke through the position line.

=== Egypt ===
Having taken Yad Mordechai on May 23, the Egyptian force, under the command of Major General Ahmad Ali al-Mwawi went up along the coast and bypassed Nitzanim. After meeting with Israeli opposition near Ashdod, he decided to stop and consolidated his positions. Naguib was to dig in at Ashdod, another force was to attack Negba, while Mwawi himself would attack Nitzanim to eliminate its threat to his rear. The Egyptian Army set up its main position in the abandoned British military base just east of Nitzanim, with smaller positions in the Cemetery Hill to the northeast and the citrus grove in the south, thus surrounding the village. Mwawi took several days to carefully work out the attack. It was to be carried out in three phases: breakthrough and capture of the water tank hill, capture of the dining hall hill and capture of the "Palace". The Egyptian force consisted of the 9th Battalion, the 3rd Company of the 7th Battalion and a medium machine gun platoon. They were also joined by a tank platoon, an AFV company, 18 pieces of field artillery, 12 anti-tank guns, an anti-aircraft battery, and supported by combat aircraft.

== Battle ==
=== Nitzanim ===
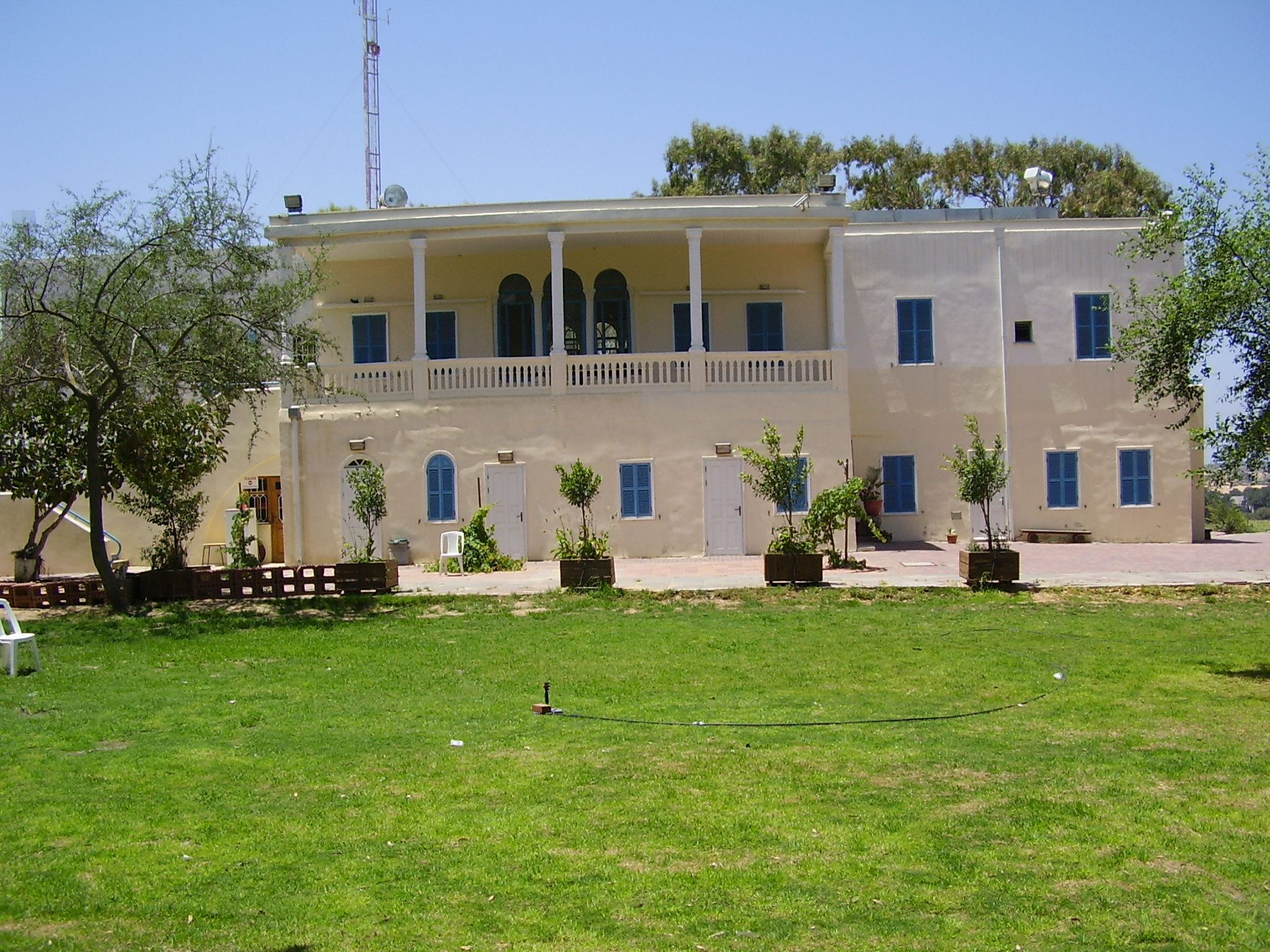
The "Palace" preserved in Old Nitzanim

At midnight on July 6–7, Egyptian forces began a bombardment of Nitzanim from the Cemetery Hill using Bofors cannons and 25-pounders, and at 06:00, a close-range bombardment using anti-tank guns. All of the prominent features in the village were destroyed. An additional mortar bombardment took place from a southeastern position, and a 6-pounder shelling from the water tank hill in the south. Shortly after, an attack was attempted from the east, but it was repelled and the water tank hill remained under Israeli control.

At 08:00, the Egyptians began an aerial bombardment of the kibbutz, which came in three waves and continued until 10:15, at which time shelling continued in the form of 25-pounder fire from Majdal about 7 km away. At 11:00, the main thrust of infantry and four tanks commenced. The rest of the armored vehicles provided cover from the adjacent abandoned British base. The Israelis used the lone PIAT in their possession against the tanks and forced them to retreat, although the PIAT broke down and the Egyptian 1st Company (9th Battalion) managed to infiltrate the water tank hill.

Position 1 was destroyed and buried its inhabitants, who were in a state of shock when evacuated from the rubble. The telephone system was cut down. A machine gun, aimed at the planes, was hit by a shell. Most of the Israelis' firearms got dirty from the dust, and one machine gun broke down. Since the beginning of the attack, the signal operator tried to contact the 53rd Battalion headquarters at Beer Tuvia. At 10:00, she managed to get an SOS through before losing contact completely. Near 11:00, four Egyptian tanks were ordered to break through into the farmstead, followed by infantry. The tanks advanced from the northeastern corner of the camp, and were met by two Israelis armed with PIATs. They managed to hit the track of one of the tanks on the second shot. The tanks halted, but the PIAT soon broke down and its operator suffered a head wound. The tanks retreated and continued to shell the Israeli position. The Egyptian infantry kept advancing, taking over positions 10, 11, 12, and capturing the water tanks area. The Egyptians reported victory. Twelve Israelis were killed by the tank shells.

The Egyptians then started the second phase of their plan—taking over the northwestern position and the dining hall area. The 4th Company of the 9th Battalion used a tank which broke through the farmstead fence at 12:30 opposite position 8, in the center of Nitzanim's northern fence, after killing six out of the seven Israelis manning the position and blinding the seventh. Schwarzstein, until then posted in the northeastern corner of the smaller orchard, moved to the dining hall and the nearby residence area, which were surrounded by embankments. He was hoping to form a second line and ordered the men from positions 5, 6, and 7 in the north to move to the dining hall area. There, he organized the reserve forces who retreated from the cowshed and the men from the northern positions for defense.

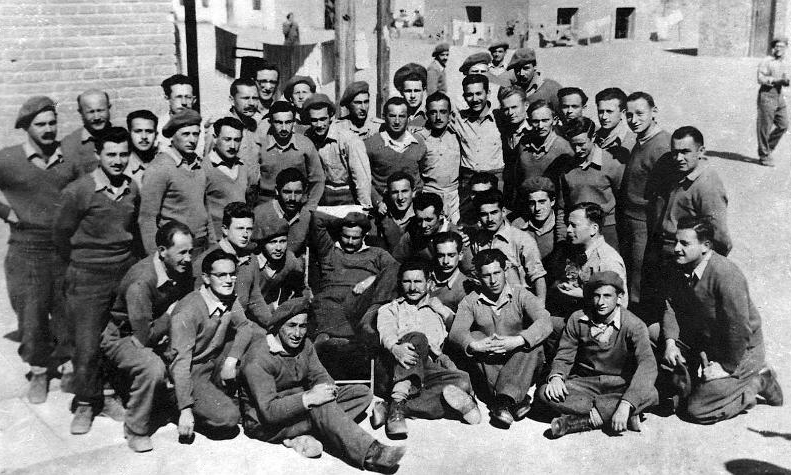
Many of the male prisoners of war in Egypt

The Egyptians commenced heavy shelling of the dining hall, and by 14:00, the defenders decided to retreat to the "Palace" in the south for a last stand. At 15:00, a retreat of all forces southwards from the village was attempted, but was stalled by the 2nd Company of the 9th Battalion situated in the citrus groves, that forced the Israelis back to the "Palace". 2–4 Israelis managed to hide in the groves and escape to Be'er Tuvia at night.

Throughout the battle, the Israeli forces tried to communicate with the rest of the army and request reinforcements, including three telegrams near the end of the battle, sent by the signal operator Miriam Ben-Ari. All attempts failed and reinforcements were not sent. The wounded commander, Avraham-Elkana Schwarzstein, carrying his bloodstained white shirt, and Ben-Ari, tried to negotiate with the Egyptians, but Schwarzstein was shot by an Egyptian officer. In response, Ben-Ari shot the one responsible and was killed on the spot. At 16:00 on June 7, 105 exhausted Israeli defenders, 26 of them injured, destroyed their remaining ammunition and equipment, and surrendered to the Egyptian forces. The Egyptians prevented their local auxiliaries from massacring all the prisoners, however, three or four of the defenders were killed after surrendering. Survivors were later "displayed" in a victory parade in Majdal, after which they were transferred to Cairo. In all, 33 were killed in the battle—17 soldiers and 16 villagers (of them 3 women).

=== Hill 69 ===
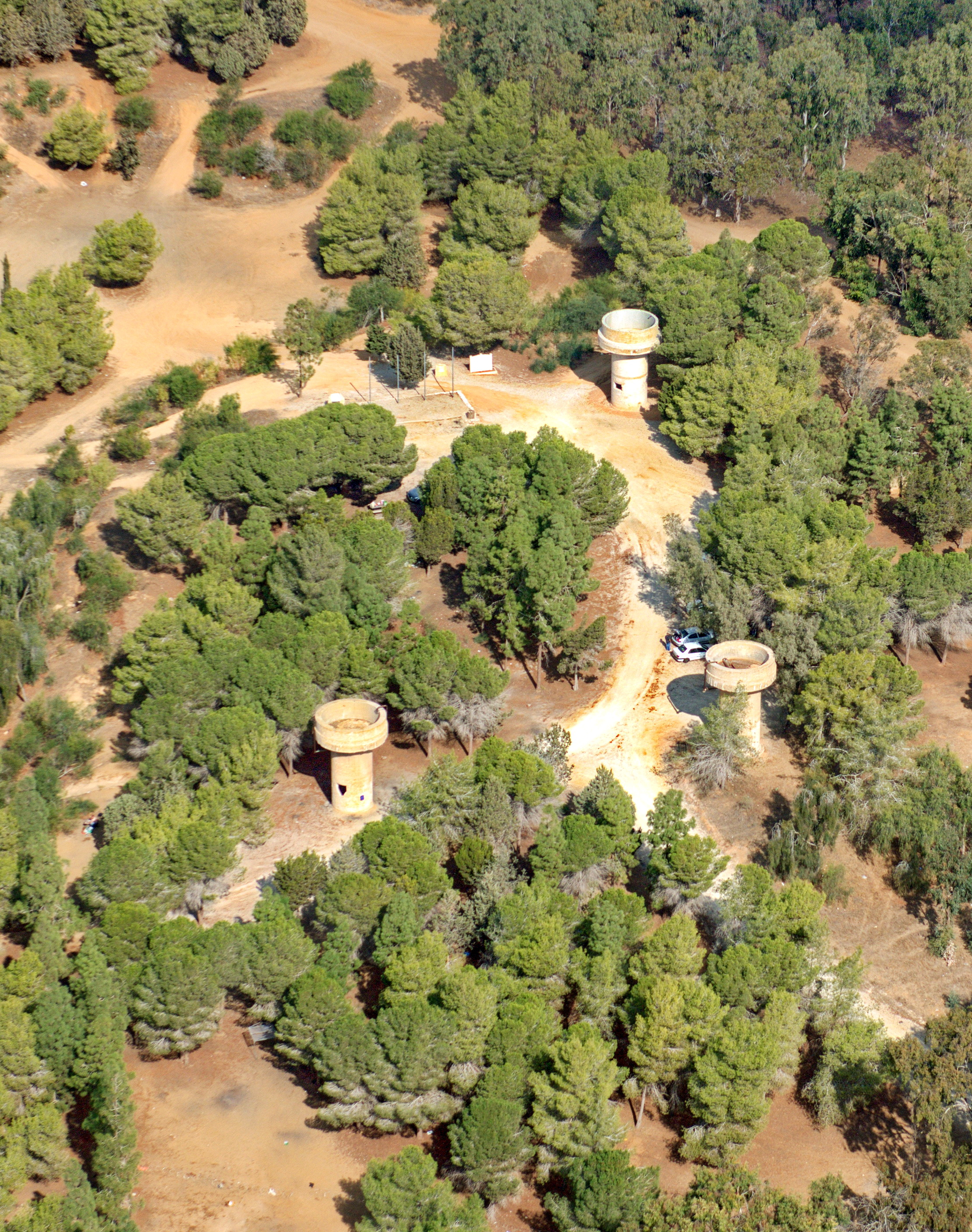
Hill 69

Three men managed to escape from Nitzanim during the day. They hid until nightfall and then infiltrated through the Egyptian lines until they reached the Givati outposts. They were not aware that Nitzanim had surrendered and the only information about it was received from Egyptian broadcasts, so the Givati commander Shimon Avidan found that out only that evening. Despite the fall of Nitzanim, he decided to attack on the night of June 7–8, as planned. One company took Hill 69 and positions to threaten the Egyptian lines at Isdud and prepared to recapture Nitzanim. Meanwhile, another, unsuccessful, attack was carried out against Isdud. Hill 69 was considered tactically important as an obstacle on the road to Isdud in face of the imminent truce.

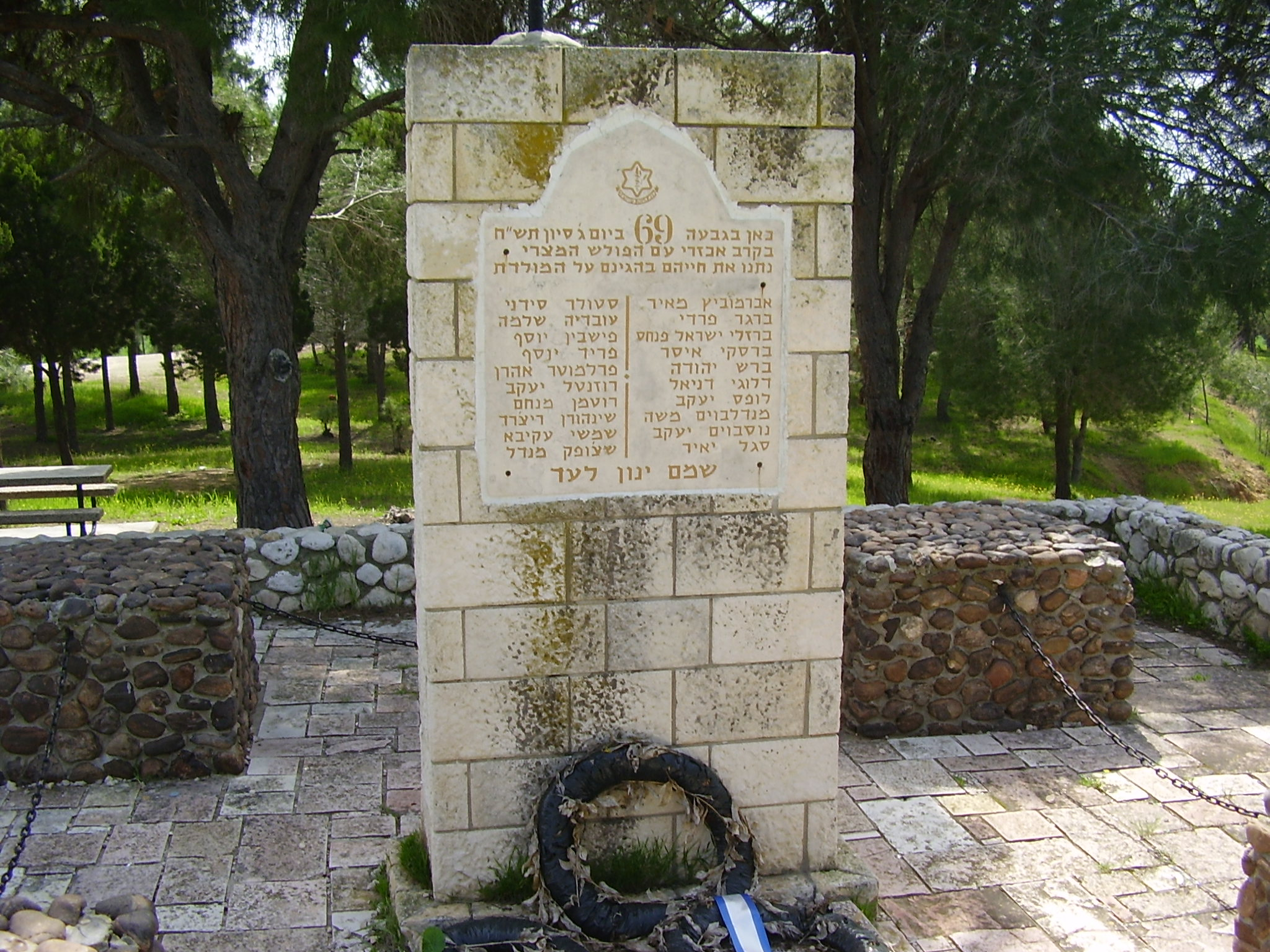
Monument to the fallen Israeli soldiers on Hill 69

On the night of June 9–10, Givati's 52nd Battalion, guided by two of the escapees, attacked Nitzanim. Zero hour was postponed after the attacking force lost its way. At dawn, the leading platoon managed to break into Nitzanim from the south and capture the "Palace", but was ordered to withdraw after being hit by heavy Egyptian fire, having lost the cover of darkness. The Egyptian artillery pursued the withdrawing Israeli force until it reached Hill 69. The 52nd Battalion forces were evacuated by armored vehicles, and soon after, the Egyptians attacked the hill, which was held by a company from the 51st Battalion. The ditches collapsed completely and the positions were destroyed. The large force that was concentrated on the hill suffered heavy casualties. The Egyptian infantry attacked from the west, supported from close range by Bren Carriers and armored cars. The Israeli company broke, and was ordered to retreat, but the withdrawal was disorganized and cost more casualties. The last Israeli to remain on the hill was an artillery observer, who ordered his guns to bring down fire on his own position, before being killed. The total Israeli death toll on the hill and the retreat from it was 20. The Egyptians tried to continue towards Beit Daras and Be'er Tuvia, but met with heavy opposition. At nightfall, they withdrew.

== Aftermath ==
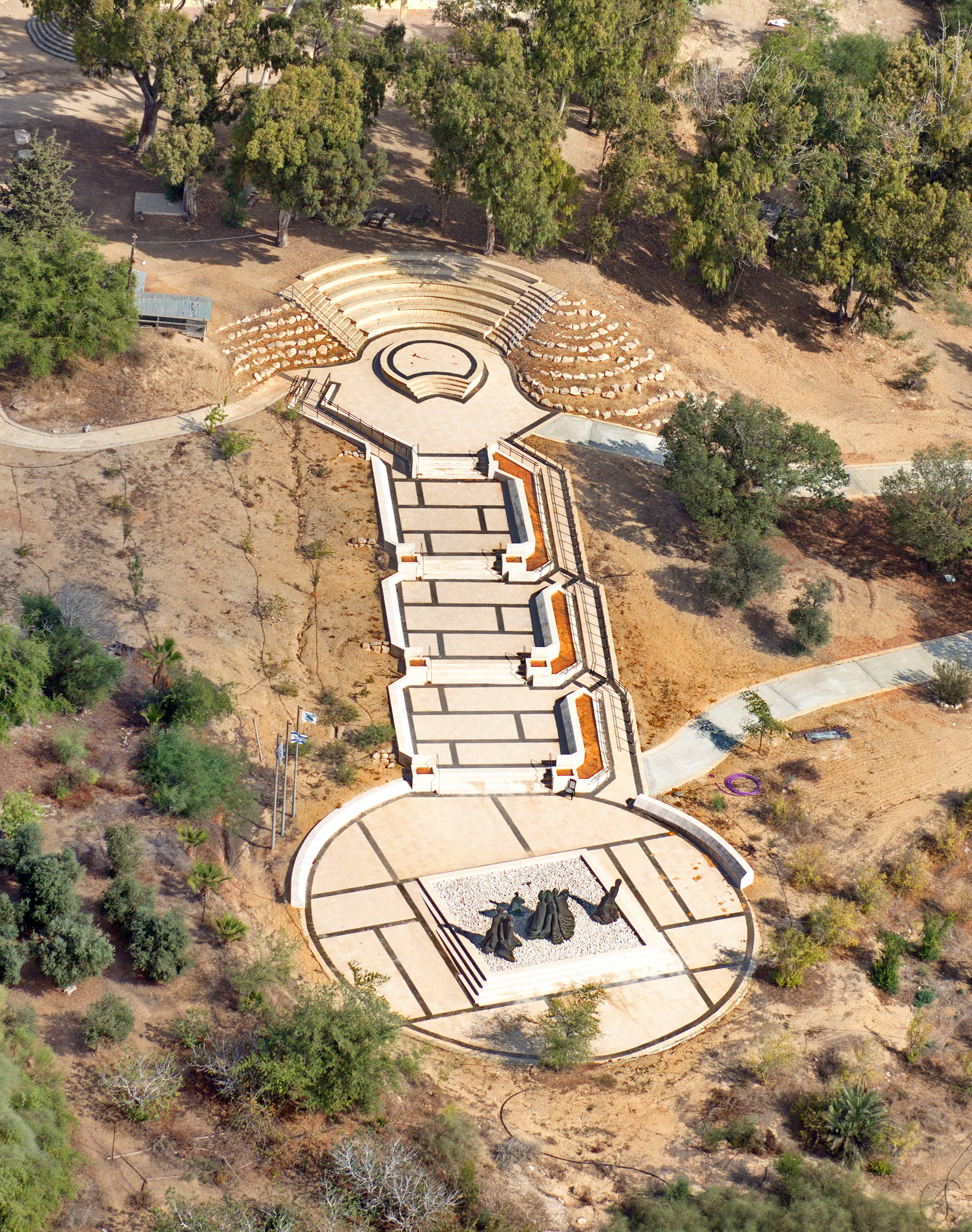
The memorial at Nitzanim

The Battle of Nitzanim was one of the few Israeli surrenders during the war and was seen by many as humiliating. The 105 prisoners captured at Nitzanim constituted the majority of prisoners-of-war captured by Egypt during the entire war. According to them, the Egyptian media covered the event widely and wrote that 300 Jews were killed in Nitzanim, it was a major submarine base and much booty was captured, including oil and fuel. Yitzhak Pundak, the battalion commander who was directly responsible for the village's defense, claims that actions could have been taken to save it, including transferring Napoleonchik cannons to the site.

After the capture of Hill 69, a major obstacle was removed for Egypt, which enabled it to attack Gal On and capture Gezer. When Givati finally reached Nitzanim after Operation Yoav, they found the village abandoned and largely destroyed, as the Egyptians retreated south to Gaza. The Israelis killed in action were buried in a mass grave in the village. The villagers who returned from captivity on March 7, 1949, as part of the 1949 Armistice Agreements, rebuilt Nitzanim on a site a few kilometers south of the original. The Nitzanim Youth Village was built in 1949 on the site of the battle, and closed in 1990, and Nitzan was founded later on the site. It was turned into a tourist attraction, featuring a visual presentation and various monuments, including the Women of Valor Center (Hebrew: יד לאישה לוחמת, Yad LeIsha Lohemet), a monument for all female warriors killed in action in Israel's wars, especially the three in Nitzanim: Miriam Ben-Ari, the intern paramedic Shulamit Dorczin, and the 18-year-old Deborah Epstein who died of her wounds in captivity.

=== Reactions in Israel ===
Abba Kovner, then the culture officer of the Givati Brigade, published a scathing leaflet denouncing the defenders. Nisan Reznik, who was one of the fighters in Nitzanim, and knew Kovner from before World War II, claimed that the letter was a result of egoism. Part of the leaflet read:

... The fighters on the southern front, soldiers of the brigade, defenders of the settlements! The hour of Nitzanim's surrender—is the hour of extreme grief and personal reflection—and a personal reflection says: One doesn't defend one's home conditionally. Defense means with all the forces at the command of one's body and soul, and if fate should so decree, it is better to fall in the trenches of the home than to surrender ... To surrender as long as the body lives and the last bullet breathes in the clip is a disgrace. To fall into the invader's captivity is shame and death!
—Abba Kovner, partial text of the Givati leaflet, signed by Shimon Avidan.

As a result, Nitzanim's members demanded an investigation into the battle immediately after the war ended, claiming that Kovner significantly and unrightfully harmed their reputation. The investigation was headed by the Chief of Staff Ya'akov Dori, who sided with the defenders and wrote:

The difficult circumstances of the battle by the residents of Nitzanim, the bitter isolation of the combatants, the lack of communication with the rear-front, lack of ammunition and food, and due to the high number of casualties in that defense, brings honor to all those who fought bitterly there, until the last bullet. What happened in Nitzanim happened also to other places, the defenders of which fought bravely to the last option.
—Ya'akov Dori

Prime Minister David Ben-Gurion also praised the defenders of Nitzanim. A thriller called Target - Tel Aviv (Hebrew: המטרה - תל אביב) by Ram Oren was published in 2004, focusing on the battle and its aftermath.

=== Historiography of 1948 Arab–Israeli War ===
A film about the battle: Image of Victory debuted July 15, 2022 on Netflix.

In the historical debate on the 1948 Arab-Israeli War, Benny Morris twice uses the example of Nitzarim to draw a comparison between Israeli and Arab attitudes during the war. He points out:

- "[like at Nitzanim], all the Jewish settlements conquered by the invading [Arab armies]... were razed after their inhabitants had fled or been incarcerated or expelled.... These expulsions by the Arab regular armies stemmed quite naturally from the expulsionist mindset prevailing in the Arab states". He draws a parallel with the Israeli attitude during the war.
- "...the Arab regular armies committed few atrocities and no large-scale massacre of POWs and civilians in the conventional war—even though they conquered [some places such as Nitzanim]"
