= Operation Pleshet =

Israeli military operation during the 1948 Arab–Israeli War

Coordinates: 31°45′50.94″N 34°39′59.09″E

- Part of the 1948 Arab–Israeli War
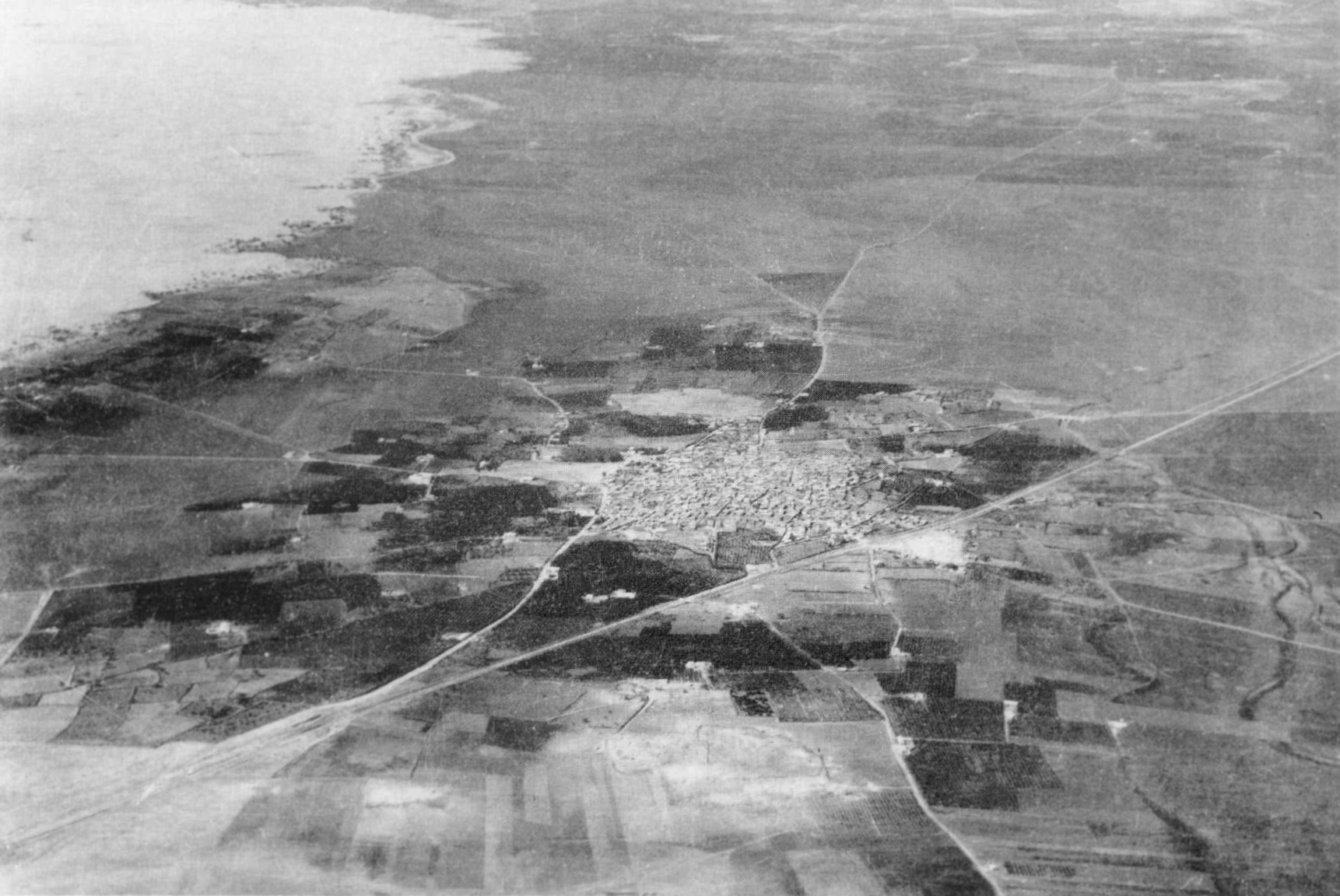
- Aerial photo of Isdud in 1935
Date	May 29 – June 3, 1948
Location	Isdud
Result	Egyptian tactical victory Initiative passed to Israeli side

Belligerents
Israel; (Israel) IDF	Arab League; Egypt; Saudi Arabia (volunteers); Sudan (volunteers)

Commanders and leaders
Lou Lenart (air force); Shimon Avidan (Givati Brigade)	Muhammad Naguib (2nd Brigade)

Strength
1,150; 6 aircraft	2,300

Casualties and losses
45 killed or missing 50 wounded 5 captured	7–15 killed 18–30 wounded

Operation Pleshet (Hebrew: מִבְצָע פְּלֶשֶׁת, Mivtza Pleshet) was an Israeli military action near the village of Isdud from May 29 to June 3, 1948 during the 1948 Arab–Israeli War. Isdud was on the Israeli southern front against the Egyptian Army, and the operation was aimed at capturing the village and stopping the Egyptian advance northwards. While only the June 2–3 engagements are officially named Operation Pleshet, the events immediately preceding are historiographically joined with it.

The preceding events consisted of an aerial bombardment, followed by small-scale Israeli harassment of the Egyptian lines, and later a ground assault (Operation Pleshet). The original plan was to attack on June 1–2, but this was canceled due to an impending ceasefire, and re-attempted on June 2–3. The Israelis, under the Givati Brigade's umbrella command, attacked in two main forces: one from the north (3 companies) and one from the south (4 reinforced companies). The Israelis had little intelligence on their enemy and were forced to retreat. They failed to capture territory, and suffered heavy casualties. However, following the operation, Egypt changed its strategy from offensive to defensive, thus halting their advance northwards.

Two unsettled historiographic debates exist revolving around the operation: whether the Egyptians were intending to advance toward Tel Aviv, which most historians agree was not the case; and whether the operation was a turning point on the Israeli southern front. Traditional Israeli historiography, supported by early Arab accounts, maintains that it was a turning point, while later Arab sources, and some New Historians, dispute this. Morris views the halt as a turning point, but doesn't believe the operation by itself "was the crucial action."

== Background ==
Prior to the founding of the State of Israel, the Yishuv leadership anticipated an attack by regular Arab armies, of which Egypt's was the strongest in terms of manpower, arms and equipment. As such, Plan Dalet took stopping a potential Egyptian attack into account, and the Isdud Bridge over the Lakhish River was blown up as part of Operation Barak on May 12. In the eyes of the Givati command, this part of the operation was of marginal importance. A platoon from the 54th Battalion, two mules and 300 kilograms of explosives were allocated for it. The mules fled the scene, and the explosives were divided among the soldiers, who delivered them to the bridge. It took two attempts to destroy it, as some of the explosives did not work the first time.

The original bridge was built over the Lakhish River (Wadi Sukrir/Wadi Fakhira) during the Roman period, and re-built by the Ottoman Empire at the end of the 19th century. A parallel railway bridge was added when the coastal railway (Lebanon–Egypt) was laid. After numerous armed raids in the area during the 1936–1939 Arab revolt in Palestine, the British authorities set up a series of pillboxes in the area, one of them next to the bridges.

Egypt invaded the newly declared State of Israel on May 15, 1948. Their strength was approximately one division, commanded by Major General Ahmed Ali al-Mwawi. Their advance was three-pronged: The main column moved north through what is today the Gaza Strip and attacked Kfar Darom, another column went east toward Beersheba, and a third attacked kibbutz Nirim. On May 17, a small force split off from Beersheba to link up with more Egyptian forces at Auja al-Hafir, on May 19 the main column attacked Yad Mordechai, and on May 20, the main force in Beersheba set out to link with the Jordanian Arab Legion in Hebron.

On May 21, Cairo sent an urgent message to its units in Palestine, saying "we want al-Majdal today". Following the Israeli Operation Bin Nun, on May 25, the Jordanian Arab Legion pressured the Egyptians to move northwards to the Ramla–Aqir–Yibna area, in order to connect later with the legion at Bab al-Wad. Doing so would divide the Israeli forces into two—the Negev, and the rest of Israel. The Egyptian commander al-Mwawi, was opposed to such a move, but the leadership in Cairo dismissed his worries, and on May 28 ordered a quarter of his total combat forces to move north from Majdal.

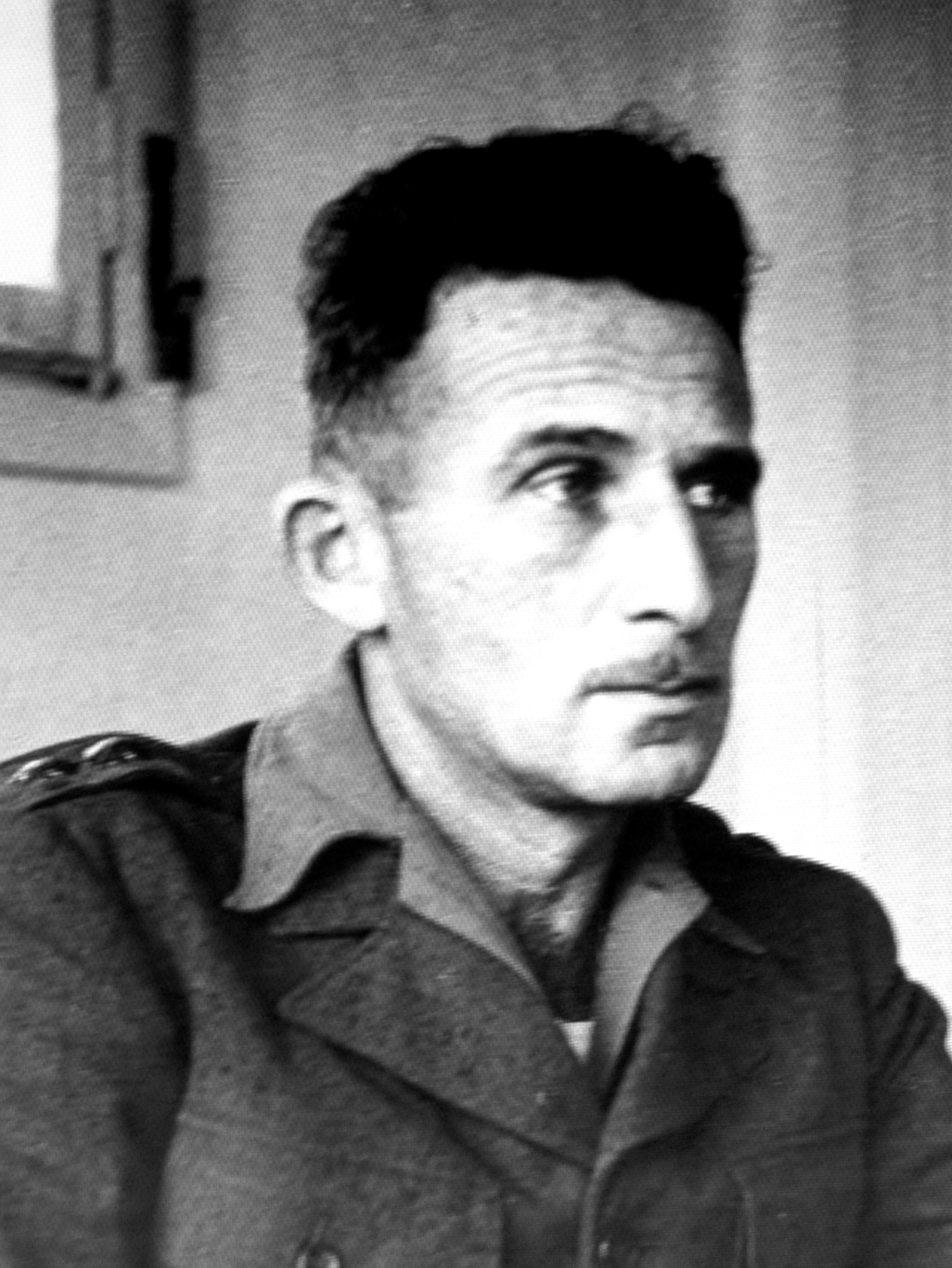
Shimon Avidan, commander of the Givati Brigade

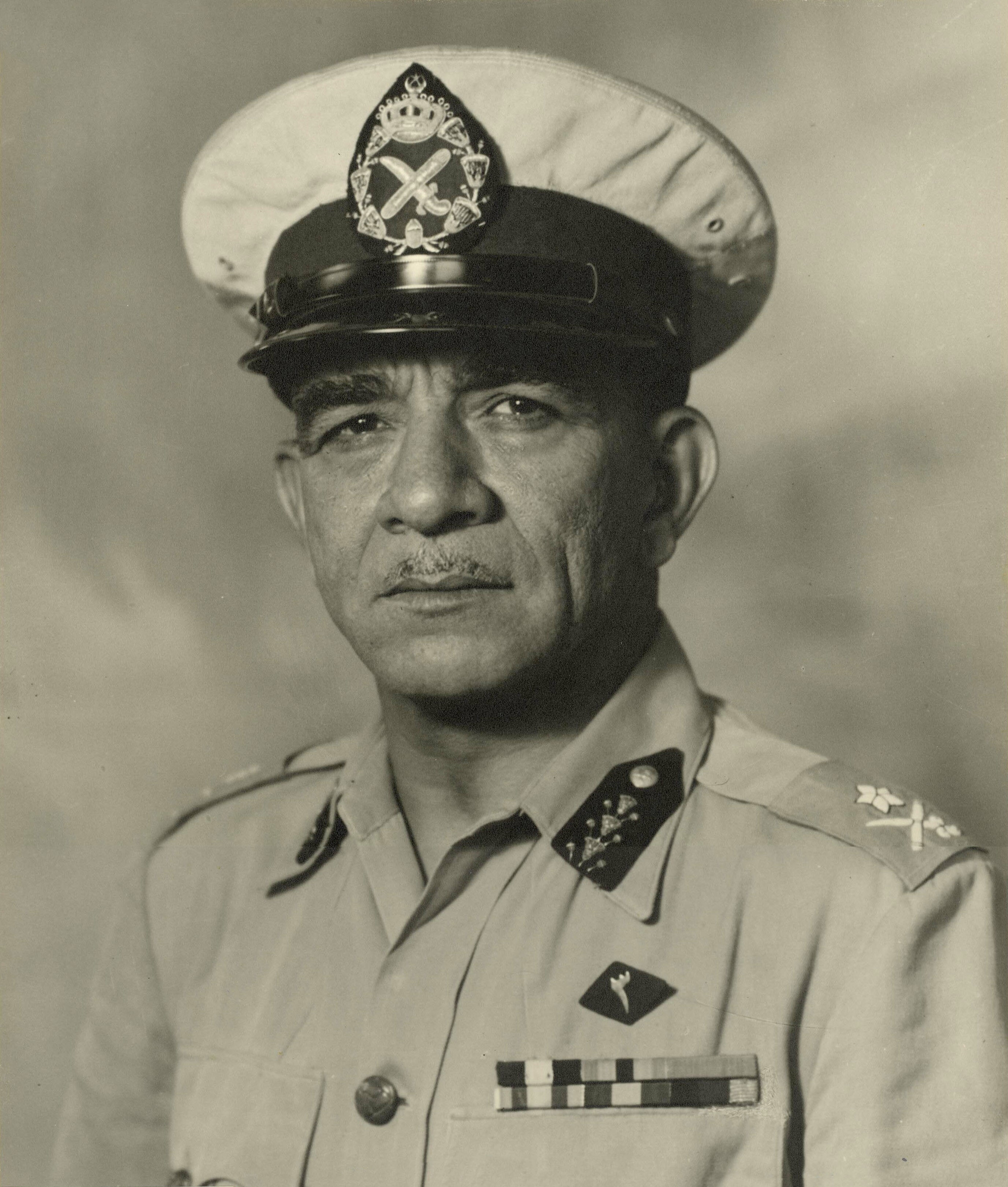
Muhammad Naguib, the appointed Egyptian 2nd Brigade commander

Gamal Abdel Nasser wrote in his memoirs that already by May 25, the Egyptian forces were spread so thin that they had no mobile reserves to assault a Jewish force, and considered it strange that they would be ordered to allocate a major contingent to fight in an unfamiliar area. Following-up his victory in the Battle of Yad Mordechai on May 23–24, al-Mwawi pushed north along the coast, bypassing the relatively well-defended Israeli village of Nitzanim. His column was reinforced by sea near Majdal, where he sent part of his force to the Majdal–Hebron road, hoping it would be able to link with another column, under the command of Lieutenant Colonel Abd el-Aziz, south of Jerusalem. Reduced to about 2,500 men, al-Mwawi resumed his march northwards. Brigadier General Muhammad Naguib was put in charge of the column by al-Mwawi, because the original commander was on vacation in Egypt.

On the afternoon of May 29, 1948, the observation post in Nitzanim spotted an Egyptian column, including tanks, armoured fighting vehicles and artillery moving north up the coastal road. The figure it reported at 16:45 was about 1,300 vehicles, although Yehoshua Goldrat, the operations officer of the Givati Brigade, being familiar with Egyptian formations, estimated that it was a brigade with about 500 vehicles. Estimates from the General Staff stood at 200 vehicles and 2,000–3,000 soldiers. At the time, the Israeli decision makers did not know where the Egyptians were headed. They envisioned one of three possibilities: A march on Tel Aviv, about 40 kilometers (25 mi) northwards—the view adopted by David Ben-Gurion; an attempt to connect to the Transjordanian Arab Legion in the Hebron area and capture the Negev—proposed by Nahum Sarig of the Negev Brigade; or an attempt to connect with the remaining Arab forces in Lydda and Ramla.

The IDF command did not see the forces in the western Negev as sufficient to fully stop an Egyptian invasion, wherever it was headed, and ordered an operation to stop or delay the advancing column. The command also feared that the Arab forces would try to create facts on the ground before the impending UN-imposed ceasefire. The two Arab forces that were considered a threat were the Iraqis in the Triangle (Jenin–Nablus–Tulkarm) and the Egyptians at Majdal–Isdud. Thus, Golani Brigade and Carmeli Brigade were to attack Jenin, Alexandroni Brigade was to harass Tulkarm, and Givati was to attack Isdud.

== Prelude ==
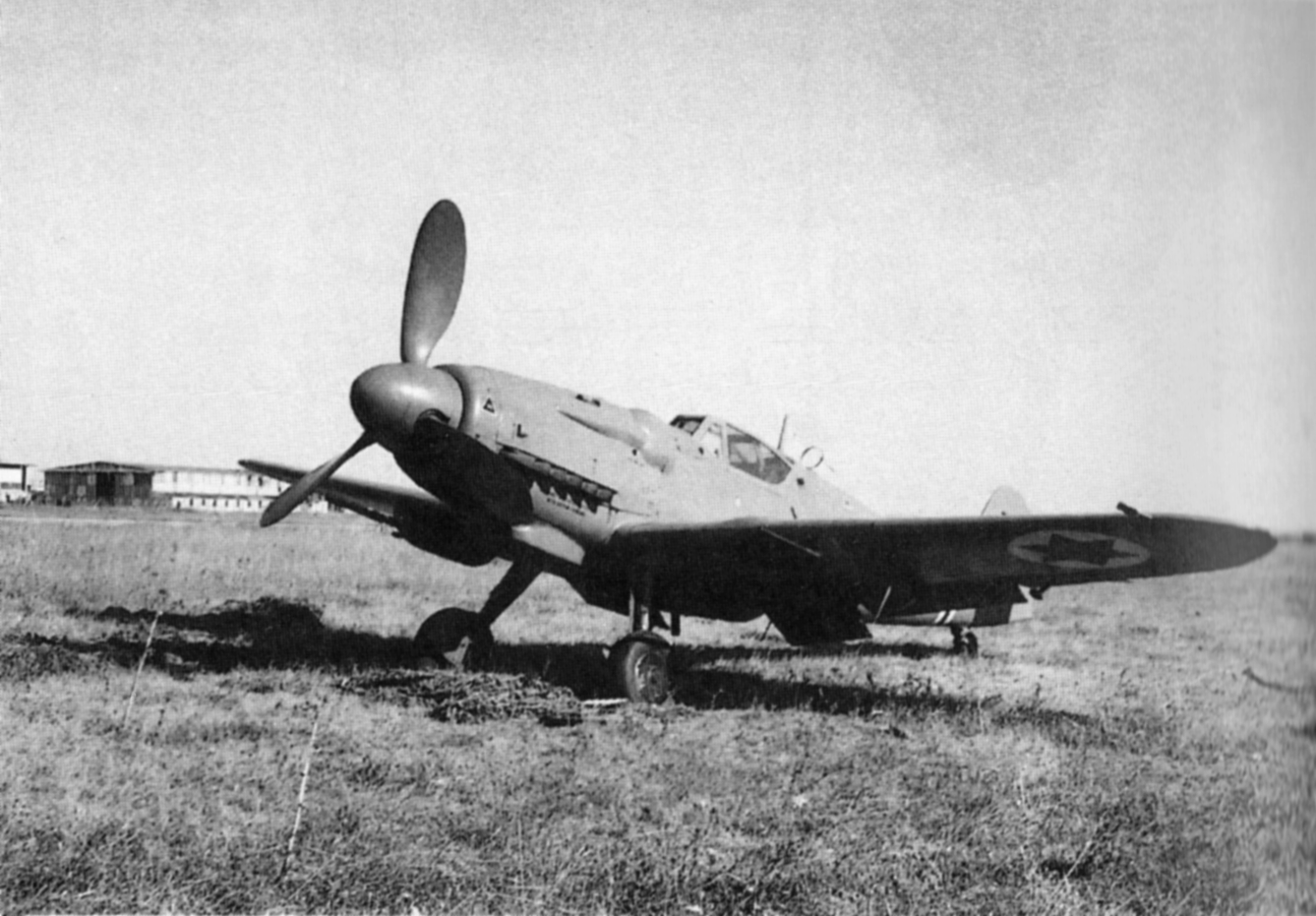
IAF Avia S-199 in June 1948

At 11:00 on May 29, the Egyptian 2nd Battalion passed through Isdud, and at 12:00–13:00, the 9th Battalion took the village itself, their progress hampered only by occasional machine gun fire from Nitzanim. Later on the same day, the 2nd Battalion stopped at the Lakhish River, about 3 km (1.9 mi) north of Isdud. The Egyptians began preparations to cross the river by erecting a Bailey bridge. Volunteers from Sudan and Saudi Arabia also joined the Isdud position.

Shimon Avidan, the commander of the Givati Brigade, which was responsible for the southern Shephelah area (including most southern Israeli villages at the time), asked to allocate forces to stop or hinder the Egyptian advance. A number of 65 mm Napoleonchik cannons were given to Givati, and units from the Palmach's Negev Brigade were poised to assist it, despite a severe shortage of manpower and munitions in the brigade. On May 28, Czech technicians at the Ekron Airbase finished assembling four Avia S-199 planes (a Messerschmitt variant) brought from Czechoslovakia, which were meant to harass the Egyptian air force base at El Arish, thus forming the IDF's first fighter squadron. Despite being untested, the Chief of Operations Yigael Yadin ordered the planes to assist Avidan's forces. According to Lou Lenart, an American pilot who flew one of the fighters, Avidan told the pilots that Givati "were desperate because between the Egyptian army of ten thousand men with several hundred vehicles and Tel Aviv stood only about 250 Israeli soldiers. The Egyptians were so confident of victory that they were lined up bumper to bumper behind the bridge".

=== Airstrike ===
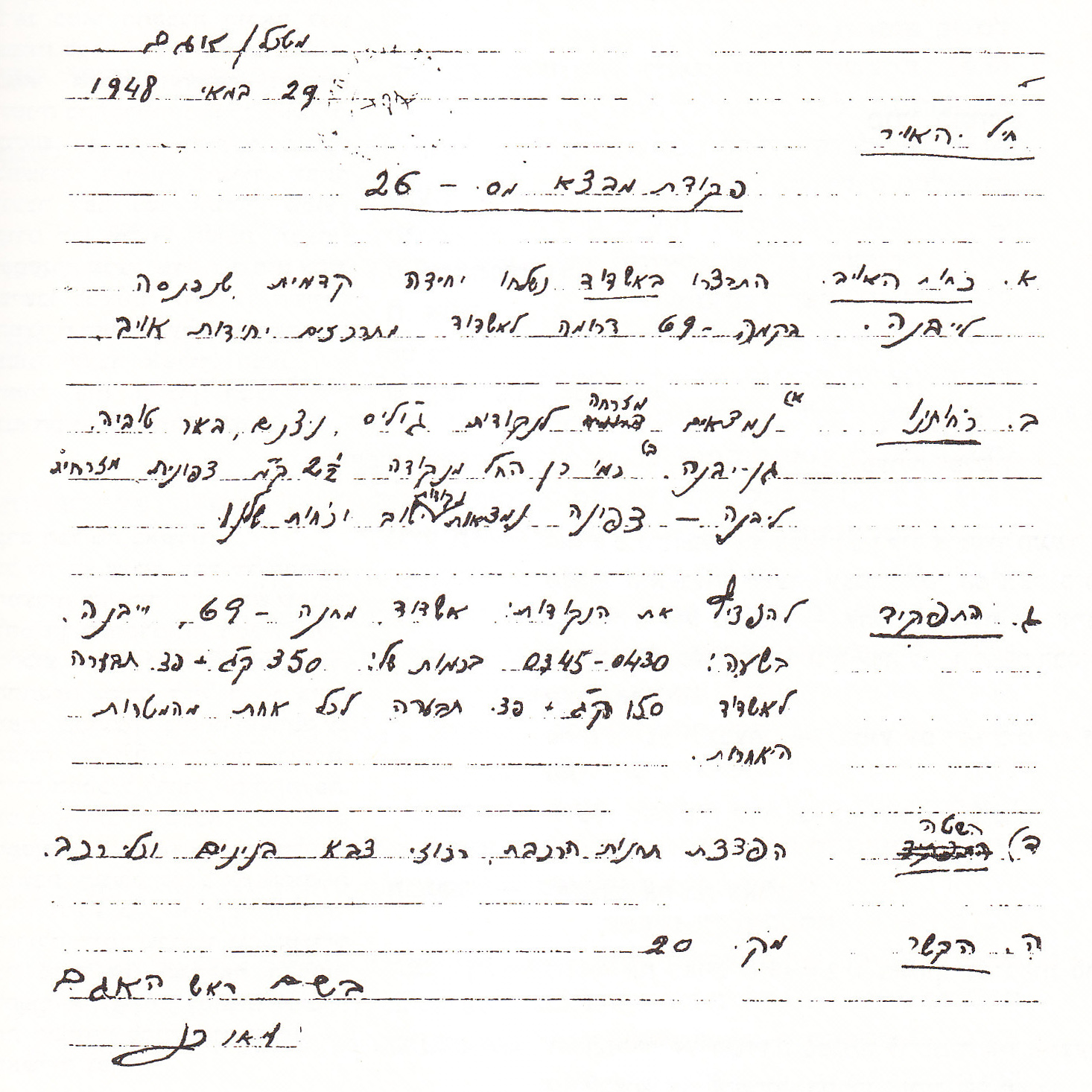
Operational order for the airstrike issued by the General Staff's Operations Directorate

At 18:00, the four Avia 199 fighter planes left Ekron to bomb and strafe the Egyptian lines concentrated near the bridge. Each plane was armed with two 70 kilograms (150 lb) bombs, two 13 mm machine guns and two 20 mm cannons. The pilots were Lou Lenart, Mordechai Alon (Kalibansky), Ezer Weizmann and Eddie Cohen, in that order. The attack was disorganized, and the damage it did was minimal. Lenart came from the north and dropped his bombs in the middle of Isdud. He then circled and strafed the Egyptian troops from the southeast and then the north again, before his cockpit was hit by ground fire and he decided to return to Ekron. According to him, the 20mm cannons in his aircraft ceased to fire after the first ten rounds, and he began to smell cordite. Alon also made three bombing and strafing runs on a large concentration of vehicles south of Isdud. He returned to Ekron by flying over the sea. Weizmann circled and attacked the Egyptian vehicles from the south, then the west, and then the south again. His 20mm cannons stopped firing after just one round.

The Egyptian army unleashed its full anti-aircraft arsenal and hit Alon's plane, but he managed to crash-land unharmed back at Ekron at 20:05, performing a ground loop. Weizmann landed at 20:15. Eddie Cohen, a volunteer pilot from South Africa, crashed and died, although it is unknown whether he was hit by anti-aircraft fire, or a technical problem caused the plane to malfunction and crash, or both. A report by Dan Tolkovsky, the Israeli Air Force operations officer at the time, stated that Cohen likely attempted to land at the Hatzor Airbase instead of Ekron, where eyewitnesses saw a burning plane crashing in the distance. He was the first Israeli Air Force KIA, and was buried in Tel Aviv (Nahalat Yitzhak) after his remains were found at the end of 1949.

Even so, despite minimal casualties, the Egyptians were caught by complete surprise and the Israeli air attack had a profound psychological effect. This was the first time that such aircraft had been used. The Arab armies had previously had complete air superiority and had no knowledge of the existence of fighter aircraft in the Israeli Air Force. An intercepted Egyptian radio message stated: "We have been heavily attacked by enemy aircraft, we are dispersing". The official Egyptian report assessed that there were only two airplanes, and that they were Spitfires. According to Ezer Weizmann, the airplanes had not been tested before the attack, and there was no evidence that they could fly or fire their weapons. However, the pilots considered this a minor issue in light of the fact that they were making history by being the first to fly Israeli fighter planes. The combination of the appearance of the IAF, the introduction of Israeli artillery, the Israeli defenses and the threat to his flank convinced al-Mwawi to stop. He concluded that his forces were overstretched and that his positions needed to be consolidated. He left Brigadier General Muhammad Naguib in command of Isdud and ordered him to dig in.

=== Operations on May 30 – June 1 ===
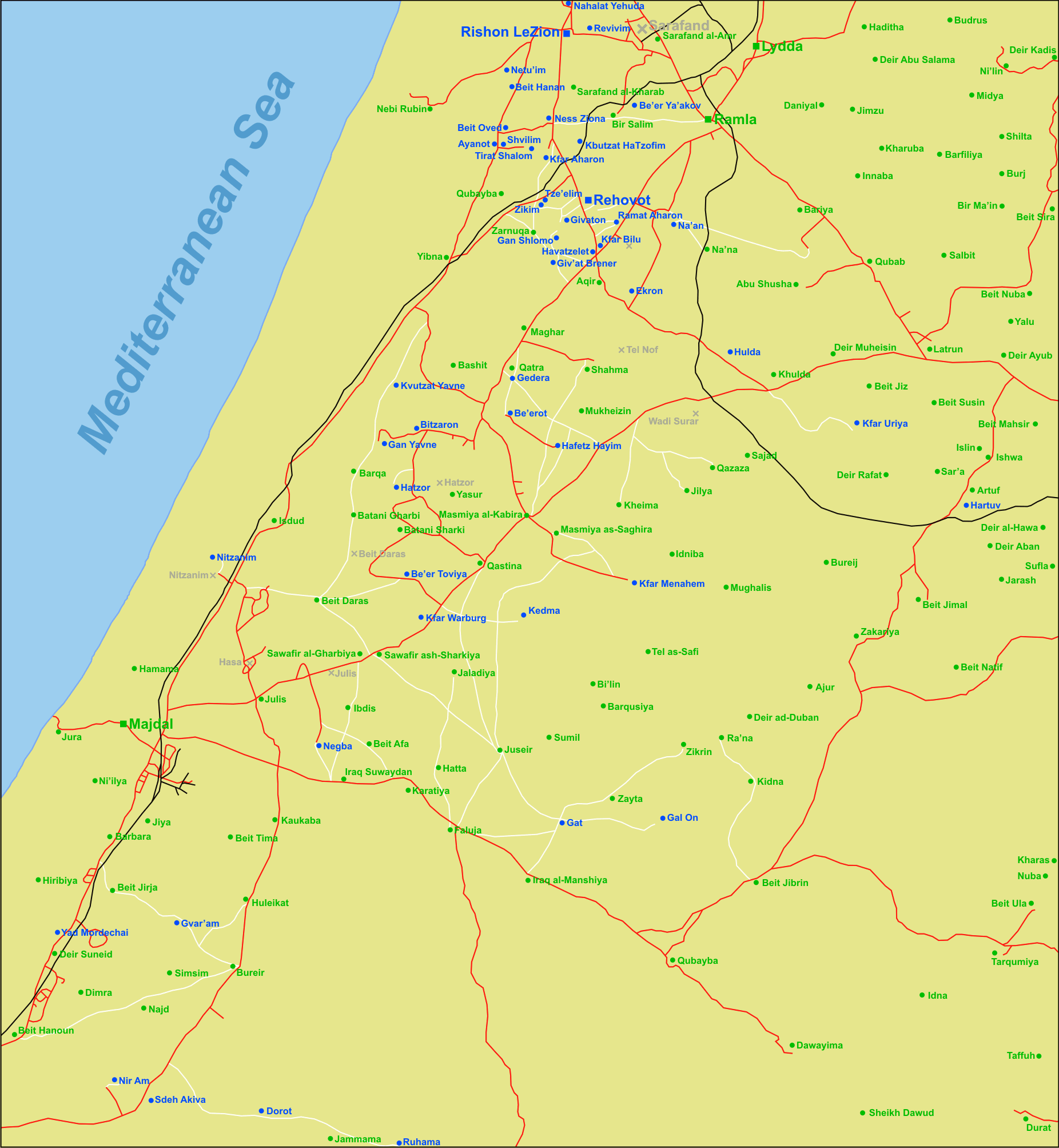
Regional orientation map

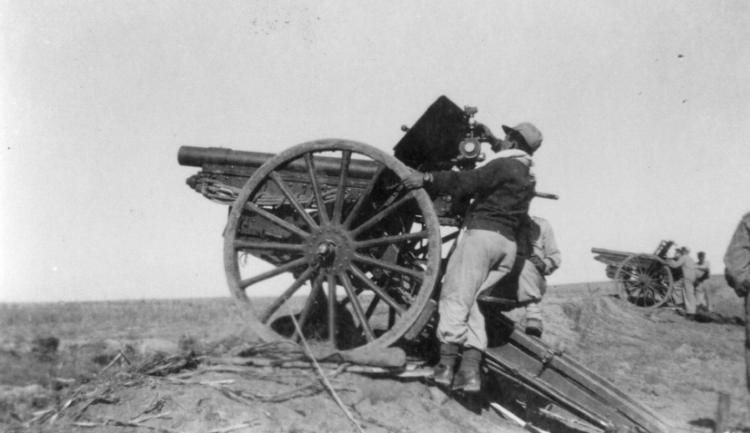
Yiftach Brigade, 1st Battalion with two Napoleonchiks in action. Negev 1948

Between May 29 and June 2, the Israel Defense Forces constantly bombarded the Egyptians in Isdud with Napoleonchik cannons and Givati patrols harassed the Egyptian lines. The 51st Battalion was tasked with laying mines along the main road near Isdud, Yavne and Hill 69. The 3rd Company of the 53rd Battalion, commanded by Yosef Geva, was tasked with harassing the enemy lines, while the 1st Company of the 54th Battalion, commanded by Aryeh Kotzer, was ordered to assault several targets. In his book In the Fields of Philistia, Uri Avnery, who participated in the battles, wrote of the harassment operation that during those days the Egyptians were fearing an Israeli attack and were firing in all directions and launching flares in hopes of discovering their enemy.

Of the preparations, he wrote:

We passed through the streets of Gedera. It was not a celebratory parade – we passed in a combat formation, wearing steel helmets, in a rear-front line. The civilians and the evacuated women [from Kfar Warburg and Be'er Tuvya] looked at us. They did not applaud. However, their eyes followed us. They also knew: this thin line of khaki shirts is their last line of defense, of Tel Aviv, of the State of Israel.

עברנו את רחובות גדרה. לא היה זה מצעד חגיגי – עברנו במבנה קרבי, חבושים כובעי פלדה, בשורה ערפית. האזרחים והנשים המפונות הסתכלו בנו. הם לא מחאו לנו כף. אך עיניהם ליוונו בדרכנו. גם הם ידעו: השורה הדקה הזאת של חולצות־האקי היא ההגנה האחרונה לביתם, לתל־אביב למדינת־ישראל.

On the night of May 30, the 54th Battalion's 1st Company attacked the area around Isdud's railway station, but was outgunned and had to retreat with four wounded. According to the company's report, the food that was given to them was rotten and further deteriorated the soldiers' ability to fight. On May 31, the Egyptian radio described the attack as a victory, and claimed hundreds of dead Israelis. The 3rd Company was unsuccessful, as intelligence on precise Egyptian positions was sparse, while the company gave its position away quickly. An Egyptian mortar scored a direct hit on one of the company's squads, which caused casualties and panic. One of the soldiers ran for cover, but lost direction, and ended up in Isdud. He walked around the village unnoticed and found a chance to return to Givati, and provided the command with invaluable information for the operation.

On May 30, the General Staff ordered the creation of a new battalion in Givati, the 57th, that would consist of about 200 Irgunists. A hundred rifles for the battalion were provided by Givati, with 50–80 more provided by the General Staff. The brigade commander Avidan also created two new companies, one in the 54th Battalion, and one in the 55th, consisting of 80 persons each. These combined forces were tasked with the mission of capturing the Arab Yibna (May 31), although the attack never materialized because the battalion took off completely unprepared, lost its way, and returned to its starting position. Also on May 30, four light planes set out from Sde Dov Airport to bomb the area of Isdud, although only one Rapide pilot spotted his target. He could not tell if any of the bombs actually exploded.

The General Staff issued an order to attack the Egyptian positions with a force three battalions strong (from the Givati and Palmach's Negev brigades). The attack was meant to take place on the night of June 1–2, and at about midnight the units involved took up positions from which the assault was meant to take off. The 51st Battalion set up positions in the Yavne–Gan Yavne–Hatzor area, the 53rd Battalion—in the Be'er Tuvia–Kfar Warburg area, and the 54th entered a company into the Gedera–Bashit area. At the last minute, the General Staff cancelled the order because of an imminent ceasefire. The ceasefire did not take effect however, and the attack was postponed to the night of June 2–3. The Egyptians discovered the original plan, and were prepared to engage the Israeli forces.

=== Cancelled attack on June 1–2 and subsequent reorganizations ===
The Israeli General Staff called for a full-scale assault on the Egyptian positions, but backed out at the last minute due to ceasefire talks. The General Staff's order, sent among others to the Givati, 7th and Negev brigades, estimated that the Egyptian forces consisted of 2,000 troops between Ashdod and the bridges to the north. The order called for the annihilation of the force on the night of June 1–2, first by staging a major attack on the supply lines, and later by assaulting and capturing Isdud. The command was officially given to Givati. The forces outlined were: seven Givati companies (of them three from the Irgun), three infantry companies and one Jeep regiment from Negev, three companies from Yiftach, a 65 mm artillery battery, and 4.2" and 25-pounder platoons. The order also said, however, and if all forces and equipment were not assembled by zero hour, Givati would have to do with the forces that were mustered.

Immediately upon receiving the order, Shimon Avidan called an emergency meeting at Hatzor. Yehoshua Goldrat, the only officer in the brigade who had experience from the British Army operating a combined force of infantry, armor, artillery and air, wrote the operational order. The order was in English, as Goldrat was not fluent in Hebrew, and was handed out to the battalion commanders on June 1. The battalion commanders translated the document into Hebrew for the company commanders. According to the plan, six companies (3 Palmach and 3 Irgun) would attack the Egyptians from the south. Three companies (2 from the 52nd and one from the 51st battalions) would attack from the north, and two companies (one from the 53rd Battalion and one from Irgun) would prevent a retreat to the east. A company from the 53rd Battalion would block reinforcement from Majdal. Only senior officers knew of the full plans however. Simha Shiloni, commander of the Palmach forces (Negev Beasts Battalion), commented that his forces came exhausted and completely unprepared to the assembly points, and he had given consent for their deployment only after being assured that they would serve as the operational reserve (the plan in fact called for these forces to lead the southern assault).

Zero hour was set for 03:00 on the night of June 1–2, but at the last moment an order came down to cancel the attack. This was a significant blow to the troops' morale, especially because before the operation, Abba Kovner, the culture officer of Givati, made a speech claiming that the attack would be an historic moment when the IDF would annihilate the Egyptian forces. Shraga Gafni, in his book The Good Sapper Alex, and Uri Avnery in In the Fields of Philistia, provided excerpts from the speech:

Tonight for the first time you will hear the wrath of our airplanes and the thunder of our cannons ... because the goal is not to capture a single village or territory, but to destroy the Egyptian column ... The air force, artillery and infantry this time will act together ... Everything that could possibly have been prepared, was.

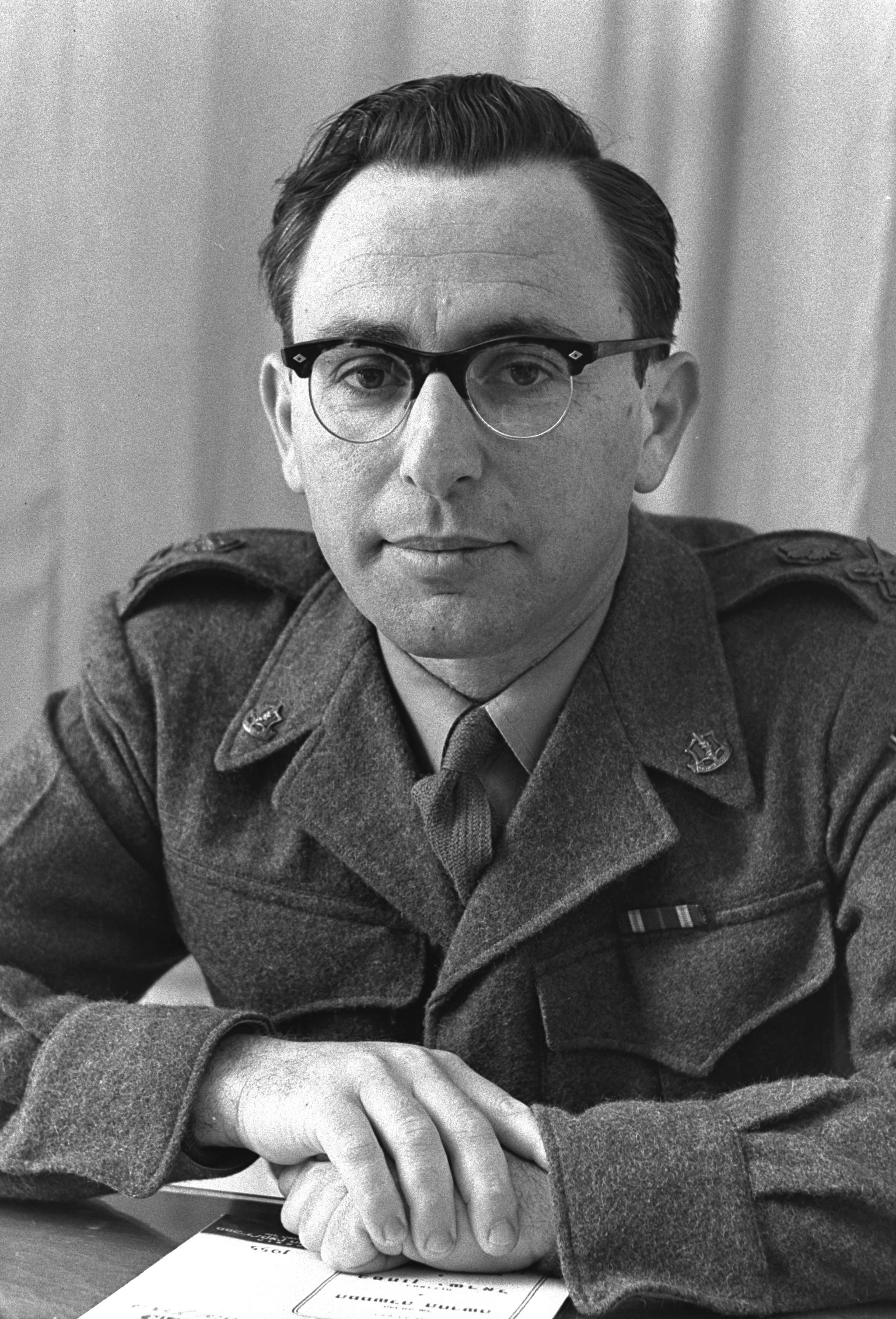
Zvi Zur, then commander of the 54th Battalion

Orders were immediately issued (at 06:00) to start new preparations. Under the new ones, two companies from the 51st Battalion were to base themselves in Hatzor and Barqa, respectively. The 52nd Battalion was to prepare at Camp Bilu (next to Kfar Bilu). The 53rd Battalion was to put two companies in Be'er Tuvia, two platoons in Negba, and one in Kfar Warburg. Two companies from the 54th were to be placed at Tel Nof (Eqron Airbase). Six platoons from the 55th were to be based between al-Maghar and al-Qubayba. The 8th Brigade was to be based between Gat, Gal On and Nitzanim, as well as remaining in the Gedera–Bashit area. A battalion was also temporarily transferred from Kiryati to Givati (now referred to as the 56th), preparing in Abu Shusha and Hulda. The 57th Battalion (Irgun) was to be placed in Zarnuqa. Of the Negev Brigade, two companies would be in Camp Julis and one in Camp Beit Daras. Finally, the artillery forces were to keep their former positions, as well as taking new ones in Bitzaron.

On the same day, the Egyptian forces also changed the disposition of their forces, moving the 9th Battalion to the Ad Halom bridge, the 2nd to Isdud itself, and the 1st to Iraq Suwaydan and Faluja. Heavy machine gun and armored units were dispersed in between. Staff soldiers and those who manned Bren carriers took positions together with regular infantry soldiers. The Israeli side did not know of this development, but was aware that they had been detected in the previous night's preparations. The army was against attacking Isdud soon, but the order was given by the political echelon. The attack was expected to be a tactical failure; Avraham Ayalon writes that it could have succeeded if only the southern Egyptian force in Isdud itself was attacked, but attributes that lack of such a plan to the inexperience of the command and the heterogeneous nature of the Israeli force, which according to him could not have pulled off such an offensive.

The new IDF plans put forth for the June 2–3 operation were slightly changed from the original. These included 1,150 fighters, as opposed to 1,300 in the initial plan. The forces consisted of the following: two Palmach companies from the Beersheba Battalion and one from the Negev Beasts Battalion, under Yohanan Zariz, a light vehicle company, two companies from the 54th Battalion and one from the 51st, under Zvi Zur, three Irgun companies, a reinforced company and platoon from the 53rd Battalion and eight artillery pieces (six Napoleonchiks and two 4.2" mortars). Another light vehicle company would be in the operational reserve. Against them were placed Egypt's 2nd Brigade, including the 2nd and 9th Battalions, three medium gun platoons, the brigade headquarters, and 12 pieces of artillery.

== Operation ==
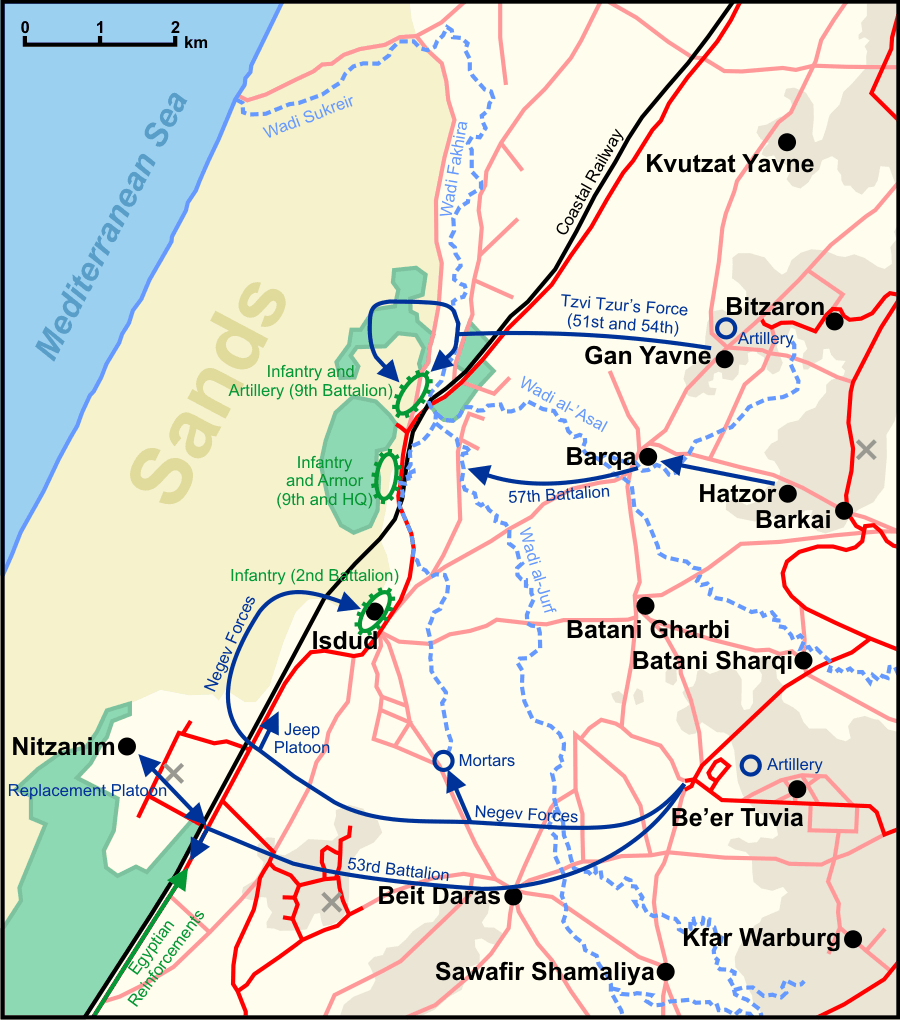
Map of the initial Israeli attack on Isdud

The operation officially began when a lone Israeli S-199 bombed Egyptian positions in Isdud at 18:00 on June 2. Five light planes—two Fairchild 24s, two Rapides and one Bonanza—also made bombing runs between 20:25 and 21:30. The bombardment did not make an impression on the readying Israeli soldiers, and in light of the noise created by the Egyptian anti-aircraft guns, the Israelis considered that the plane was lucky to have survived the run. In addition, the troops were exhausted, not having had proper sleep in the four days preceding the operation. At 22:00, the Israeli forces started moving against the Egyptian positions.

A soldier from the 54th Battalion said of the airstrike:

Close to sunset, while we were in the staging area in Gan Yavne, our airplane appeared above us and turned to Ashdod. We blessed it in our hearts. A few minutes hadn't passed when the skies that were red because of the sunset, became several times redder from the anti-aircraft positioned in the Ashdod area that flooded the sky, chasing this airplane. The fire was great, and its impression on us – with all our excitement about the view – was most difficult. 'Great fire the Egyptians have' said the soldiers and breathed a sigh of relief when they saw the orphan airplane manage to escape alive. ... And the opinions varied: some claimed, that tomorrow a Hebrew airplane would be able to fly over Ashdod easily, because it would fall into our hands, and others prayed for a similar fate – to dip in the fire and escape alive.

קרוב לשקיעת החמה, בהיותנו בשטח הכינוס בגן־יבנה, הופיע אוירון שלנו מעלינו ופנה לאשדוד. ברכנוהו בלבנו. לא עברו דקות ספורות והשמים האדומים בשל שקיעת השמש האדימו, פי כמה, מפגזי התותחים הנגד־מטוסיים המוצבים באיזור אשדוד שהציפו את הרקיע בדרכם אחרי אוירון זה. האש היתה עצומה ורישומה עלינו – עם כל התפעלותנו מן הנוף – היה קשה ביותר. אש עצומה יש למצרים' אמרו החברים ונשמו לרוחה כשראו את אוירוננו היתום מצליח להסתלק בשלום. – – – והדעות נחלקו: היו שטענו, שמחר יוכל אוירון עברי לטוס בשקט מעל אשדוד, כיון שנפול תיפול בידינו, והיו שהתפללו לגורל דומה – לטבול באש אך לצאת ממנה בשלום

=== Northern effort ===
The forces that were to attack the Isdud bridge (today Ad Halom) set out from Gan Yavne at 22:20: the 3rd Company of the 51st Battalion (commanded by Yosef "Yosh" Harpaz), a mixed company from the 54th (from the 2nd and 3rd companies) under Asher Dromi, and the 54th's 1st Company under Aryeh Kotzer. The overall commander was Zvi Zur, who was accompanied by the battalion staff, soldiers from a light vehicle company, and from the 54th's 3rd Company. According to plan, Zur was meant to flank the Egyptians from the west and achieve surprise. When they reached Wadi Fakhira however, about 700 m from the Egyptian position, it proved difficult to cross and caused a significant delay.

The movement was discovered at about 00:30 on June 3, and Zur's force lost the element of surprise. The Egyptian position that engaged the Israelis had two companies, but Harpaz, the 51st's 3rd Company's commander, underestimated the force and reported that it contained only one platoon. Zur decided to regroup in the wadi and ordered Aryeh Kotzer's 1st Company to stay and engage the Egyptians at the spot where they were originally discovered and assault the pillbox there, while the rest of the forces would try a turning movement.

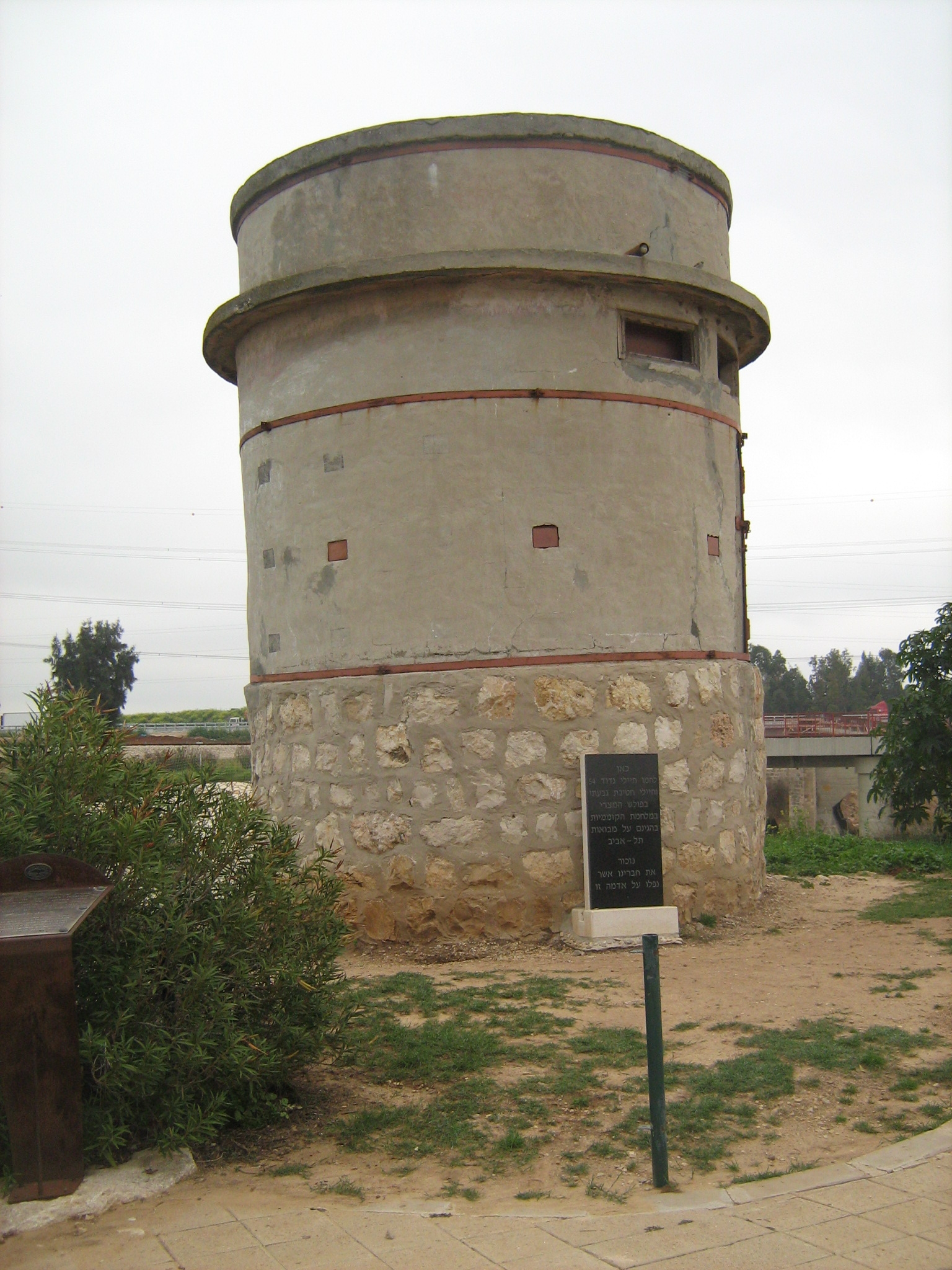
The pillbox at Ad Halom in 2005

Kotzer estimated that a frontal assault against the Egyptians would be useless, as they were dug in on both sides of the pillbox. In complete darkness, the 1st Company made its way south through the wadi hoping to avoid enemy fire from superior positions and weapons until they were close enough to respond. At 03:00, the Israeli artillery barrage started, but did not do significant damage and only alerted all Egyptian positions to the Israeli presence. The only Israeli unit close to engagement at the time was Kotzer's company. About 100 m away from the Egyptian defense line, they stepped into an ambush and the leading squad was eliminated. Kotzer ordered the machine gunners to climb to the east bank of the wadi to provide cover for a counterattack, and this move also led to Israeli casualties. The counterattack was difficult and only destroyed some small Egyptian entrenchments.

Even though some of his soldiers came within 60 meters of the pillbox, after 19 of them (over a third) were killed and the sun began rising in the horizon, Kotzer decided to retreat, unable to receive official permission due to communication problems. He ordered all of his troops to collect the wounded and any weapons they could carry, helping with the task himself. The dead were left in the field, including the medics (not a single medic survived). The injured were brought under fire into the wadi and at about 07:00 the force made its way to an unoccupied two-storey building on the east bank. After the Egyptians started shelling the building with mortars, Kotzer's company began to move towards Gan Yavne.

A soldier who witnessed the events stated:

I will never forget the parting look that Aryeh gave toward the wadi and in fact toward his dead who remained in the cursed wadi. Only five of us were still in the wadi: Kotzer, Izi the staff sergeant, and three guards, including myself. Kotzer commanded us to run towards the house in the grove, while he stayed last and a world of grief in his eyes. For another moment he glanced at the wadi, as if to say goodbye to his friends-subordinates, and then turned to run after us.

לעולם לא אשכח את מבט הפרידה ששלח אריה קוצר לעבר הואדי ולמעשה לעבר ההרוגים שלו שנשארו בואדי הארור. נשארנו בואדי חמישה: קוצר, איזי הרס"פ ושלושה מבטיחים, בתוכם אנוכי. קוצר פקד עלינו לקפוץ לעבר הבית שבפרדס ואילו הוא נשאר אחרון ויגון עולם בעיניו. רגע הפנה עוד מבטו לואדי, להיפרד כביכול מחבריו־פקודיו, ואחר פנה לרוץ בעקבותינו

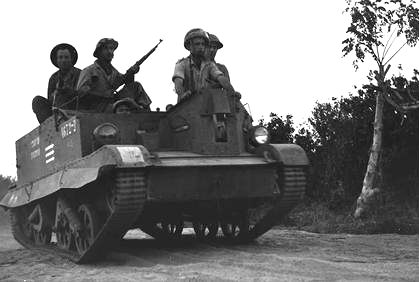
Egyptian Bren carrier in the service of the Givati Brigade after being captured by Israeli forces (not during Operation Pleshet)

Zur's maneuver sent Israel's forces into unknown territory, and they encountered an Egyptian entrenchment that caught them unawares. His original plan was to send Yosef Harpaz and the 3rd Company and then Dromi's company, but when fire was opened on Harpaz's men (at approximately 04:00), Zur ordered him to execute a frontal assault. Harpaz decided to do this in three single-platoon waves: the first two would attack the Egyptians, while the third would provide cover for the forces. The first platoon was inexperienced and had never fought against Egypt's army. After advancing, they encountered what were probably Bren carriers, which their commander reported were tanks. Harpaz then sent the second, more experienced, platoon of 15 men, who were also able to better utilize the cover fire. Eventually, the first platoon fled from the battlefield without being ordered to do so and the attack was only two platoons strong. However, this still assisted Aryeh Kotzer on the other side of the Egyptian positions to evacuate his injured troops.

At dawn, after his attacked failed to overtake any major positions, Zur decided to withdraw, for the first time in his life. He ordered Harpaz's company, which had the most casualties, to go first, and at 06:00 told Dromi's company to follow. Harpaz's company had five men missing in action, four of whom were picked up by Dromi's people. One of Dromi's platoons remained on top of a sand dune to provide cover fire for the retreat. Meanwhile, the rest of the company made its way under the road and the railway through culverts. On the eastern side, Dromi met Harpaz. They sent the cover platoon home with the injured, and remained in their place to wait for Zur. Their lookout also spotted Kotzer's retreating company and Harpaz requested artillery cover using the only working communication device they had. The Napoleonchiks missed their targets, but deterred the Egyptians, who stopped following Kotzer.

Zur was extremely reluctant to withdraw his personal forces. He decided to do so only at 09:00, when it became clear that the other two companies were at a safe distance, and the Egyptians were massing for a counterattack. First, the injured were evacuated, then the rest of the forces made their way back, each squad providing cover for the next. The Egyptian artillery caused the forces to scatter, and the commanders had difficulty diverting them to the general retreat path. After they came to a small grove to the west of the main road, it was discovered that three were missing and 17 injured, who were treated by the only remaining medic. Approximately at noon, Zur's men met with Dromi and Harpaz, and the working communication device was used to summon vehicles to take the soldiers to Gan Yavne.

=== Southern effort ===
Four motorized companies from the Negev Brigade left Be'er Tuvia. They set up a position of 4.2 inch mortars and medium machine guns about midway between Isdud and Beit Daras, to shell Isdud from the southeast. A reinforced company also left Be'er Tuvia and took up positions between Hill 69 and the military base near Nitzanim to cut off Egyptian reinforcements coming from Majdal. The 57th Battalion (consisting of Irgun veterans) left Hatzor to assault Isdud from the northeast. The 53rd Battalion was accompanied by a reinforced platoon of 44 soldiers from the temporary 58th Battalion (a new recruit unit), which made its way to Nitzanim in order to be replaced by a more experienced platoon from the 53rd.

When the Negev forces reached the coastal road, they realized that they could not continue on their vehicles, which could not travel in the sand dunes to the west of the road. The vehicles were therefore left with a platoon to the south of Isdud to block a possible Egyptian retreat. The other soldiers continued on foot into the sand dunes in an attempt to flank the Egyptian positions. On the second try, the Negev forces successfully captured several key points in the village, and destroyed a cannon. Nahum Sarig, the Negev Brigade commander, later wrote that the lack of intelligence on the enemy prevented the Israeli force from continuing its assault, while the Egyptians had time to regroup.

Despite Negev's achievements, they were also given an order to retreat, as the Israeli command did not wish to fight in broad daylight. The retreating forces had no choice but to use a route similar to the ones they came from, which slowed down their movement. Most of the machine guns that they had brought had broken down in the sandy environment, and could not provide them with cover. They were also carrying a multitude of wounded soldiers. Muhammad Naguib decided to use the armored vehicles in his operational reserve against the retreating forces, fearing a possible cut-off from the rest of the Egyptian forces in Palestine. According to Simha Shiloni, commander of the Negev Beasts battalion, the Israelis, especially the wounded, thought that all was lost when this happened. However, the vehicles stopped eventually as they got bogged down in the sands, and the troops made it back to Nitzanim. Sixteen Israeli soldiers were killed in the retreat.

Meanwhile, the 57th Battalion made its way via Barqa towards Isdud. These troops were meant to serve as a diversionary force. As such, when they reached Wadi al-Jurf, (Note: Wadi al-Jurf is part of the Lakhish river and has also been referred to as Wadi Sukrir or Wadi al-Majma (see map).) about 750 m (820 yd) from the Egyptian position, they decided not to cross the wadi and instead fired on the Egyptians from the other side. They were too far away however to inflict concrete damage, but also did not suffer any casualties. Nahum Sarig later accused this force of also falsely reporting their positions, undermining the efforts of his Negev Brigade.

On Hill 69 and the coastal road, the 53rd Battalion intercepted and engaged a contingent of Egyptian reinforcements from Majdal. After the battles, the 53rd Battalion reported that at 03:00, they had been ready to ambush possible reinforcements, and at 06:00, an Egyptian convoy of two armored vehicles and 4 other vehicles made their way to Isdud. They were hit by Israeli mines, operated by Avraham Schwarzstein's platoon (see Battle of Nitzanim), and only two vehicles made it out and back to Majdal. At 09:00 the general retreat order was given, and after reaching Nitzanim, Schwarzstein's platoon set out to assist the Negev forces' retreat, helping carry the 20-so casualties. The forces on Hill 69 retreated only at noon to Be'er Tuvia.

== Aftermath and significance ==
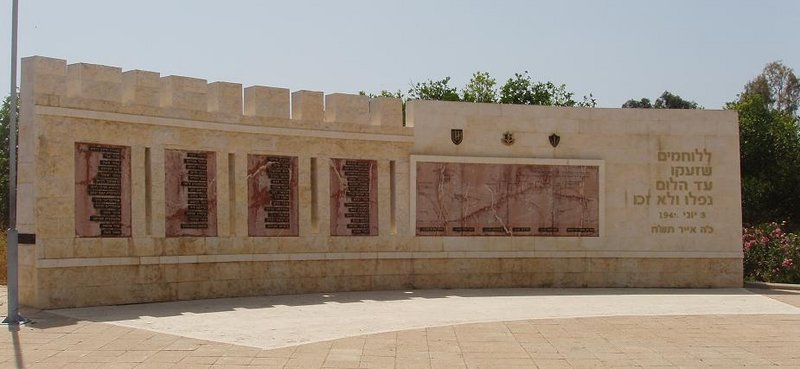
Monument for the fallen Israeli soldiers at Ad Halom

In all, 45 Israelis were killed, 50 were wounded, and 5 captured by Egypt. Of them, 29 killed and 34 wounded were from Zur's 54th Company. Egyptian sources reported 15 killed and 30 wounded, although this does not include the casualties suffered by the intercepted reinforcements from Majdal. Even before the final retreating troops came home, the Givati command had issued a new operation order, calling for renewed artillery and air bombardment of Isdud, and small harassment operations. The 57th Battalion, which gained a bad reputation after its failures in Yibna and Isdud, carried out several such successful operations, regaining prestige in the brigade.

While the Israelis suffered a major tactical defeat in Operation Pleshet, it is generally believed in Israel that the strategic goal of the operation—stopping the Egyptian advance—was achieved, unbeknown to the Israeli command at the time. This also allowed the capture of Arab Yibna, where the remaining residents expected the Egyptian Army to reach them, and mostly fled following the battle. Since the United Nations Partition Plan for Palestine line ran between Isdud and Yibna, the outcome of the battle meant that on the coastal strip, the Egyptians had failed to cross over into territory assigned to the State of Israel. The bridge over the Lakhish River has since been known as Ad Halom ("thus far").

Even though in his 1955 book Egypt's Destiny, Naguib wrote that his brigade's successful stand was a glorious victory with few consequences, estimating 450 Israeli dead (out of a perceived 4,000 attackers), a logbook captured by Israel during the war revealed that he was extremely worried about the future fate of his forces. He requested immediate assistance, including air support to determine the location of the Israeli cannons, a medevac unit, reinforcements, munitions and communication wires. It is also likely that he believed that the 53rd Battalion's force blocking the road from Majdal was still in place, and therefore thought that he was surrounded.

Sizable reinforcements—the 6th Battalion—came to Naguib only when his 9th Battalion was poised to attack Nitzanim. Aside from Nitzanim (June 7), the Egyptian Army shifted its entire concentration on clearing it flanks, successfully clearing a path between Majdal and al-Faluja. The Israeli chronicler and officer Avraham Ayalon wrote that the Israeli retreat from Hill 69 on June 3, along with the rest of the forces, which he believed unnecessary, was a major contributing factor to the subsequent Egyptian victories.

=== Historiography ===
The main points of historiographical dispute about the battle are whether or not the Egyptians were planning to advance northward toward Tel Aviv, and whether or not the battle was one of the turning points of the 1948 Arab–Israeli War. On June 18, after the first truce of the war took effect, Nahum Sarig said in a staff meeting, attended by the Minister of Defense, that at the time the Egyptian plans were not clear, but that now their plans were to penetrate the Negev. Ben Gurion, on the other hand, noted in his diary that the Egyptians were set on taking Tel Aviv and advancing north. In 1958, Major General Yitzhak Rabin addressed the issue; he felt that the Egyptian stop at Isdud was the result of technical difficulties, following fifteen days of continuous movement, including battles along the way. This, Rabin thought, along with ground and aerial counterattacks, eventually delayed their drive on Tel Aviv. Later, he said, the Egyptians tried to make contact with the Jordanian forces at Latrun and, after a failed pincer movement, tried to cut the Negev off from Israel. According to Israeli historian Reuven Aharoni, the battle's glorification and idealization suited the sentimental needs of the Israeli people. He believes that there is still no definite answer to the question of whether or not the Egyptians planning to drive on to Tel Aviv.

Israeli Arab historian Mustafa Kabha wrote that Egyptian and other Arab historians did not attribute as much importance to the battle as Israeli ones. They ask what the Egyptian objective was, and whether or not it was wise to advance without securing their lines of communication. Abdullah el Tell, commander of the Jordanian Legion in Jerusalem, thought that the Egyptians did not consider the Legion's needs. Aware of their weaknesses, they did not let anything distract them from reaching Tel Aviv. The Egyptian war log, from 19:00 on May 28, 1948, showed concern over the lines of communication. Muhammad Nimr al-Hawari wrote that while the Egyptians publicly declared that the target was Tel Aviv, they never actually meant to advance farther than their Isdud fortifications. As evidence, he cited the Egyptian refusal to take the undefended Yibna despite the villagers' repeated cries for help. Bahjat Abu-Gharbiyeh, one of Abd al-Qadir al-Husayni's deputies and commander of the Bayt Jibrin area, wrote that the Egyptians never had a clear plan, because their leadership were not really interested in a war. Therefore, their efforts were improvised. Kabha concludes that Arab historiography considers the battle the successful realization of a tactical move, designed to serve the actions of the badly coordinated Arab armies.

The Egyptian officer Kamal Ismail ash-Sharif commented in his memoirs that this was a turning point in the war on the Egyptian–Israeli front:

According to the plan created by the Arab countries, the Egyptian Army was meant to advance until Yibna, although as soon as the first Egyptian forces reached Isdud, the enemy concentrated large forces in the area of Rehovot and began a heavy assault on the Egyptian Army. This attack was repelled, but the enemy managed to accomplish at least one goal – pinning down the Egyptian Army to its positions in Isdud. It is not an exaggeration to say that the Jewish attack on Isdud was a turning point in the Egyptian–Israeli war, because from that moment, the Egyptian headquarters was forced to change its plans. Because the Egyptian command would be chasing Zionist gangs, it decided to be content with separating the Negev from the other parts of the country.

Israeli historian David Tal agreed with this view; Yoav Gelber, when asked about this, commented that the significance of the attack, along with two other major tactical failures—Latrun and Jenin—was in the fact that the initiative passed to the Israeli side, and the Arabs conducted only small assaults after these operations. Scholar Fawaz Gerges noted that the Egyptians originally assumed that the further their army advances, the weaker the Israeli resistance would become.

Unlike traditional Israeli historiography, Arab sources in general do not see it as a turning point in the war. They agree that the Egyptian declarations regarding Tel Aviv as the main strategic objective were ostentatious rather than operative. In his book 1948, New Historian Benny Morris also disagrees with the traditional Israeli view, and states that portraying the operation "as the crucial action in which the Egyptian advance was stymied" is a mistake. However, in a March 15, 2007 panel of historians, Morris said that at least in the Egyptian expeditionary force, the Israeli attack did lead to a decision to stop advancing.
