= Lou Lenart =

Israeli aviator

- לו לנרט
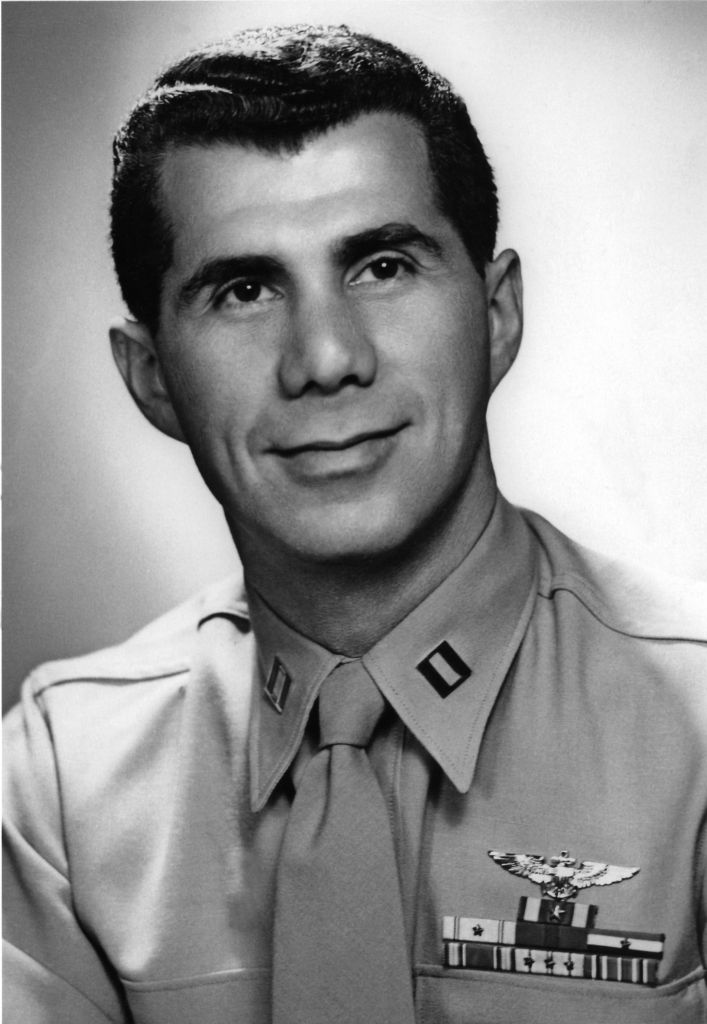
- Born: Lajos Lenovitz; April 24, 1921; Sátoraljaújhely, Kingdom of Hungary
- Died: July 20, 2015 (aged 94); Ra'anana, Israel
- Spouse: Rachel Nir (? – July 20, 2015) (his death)
- Children: 1
- Writing career
- Language: English and Hebrew

Louis Lenart (Hebrew: לואי לנרט; April 24, 1921 – July 20, 2015) was a Hungarian-born American-Israeli fighter pilot. He served as a fighter pilot in the United States Marine Corps during World War II and the fledgling Israeli Air Force during the 1948 Arab-Israeli War. He was also a film producer and sports team manager. His exploits in the 1948 war were documented in the 2015 documentary film A Wing and a Prayer.

== Early life ==
Lenart was born in Hungary as Lajos Lenovitz to a Jewish family in 1921, in the town of Sátoraljaújhely, near the Czechoslovak border. His parents were farmers. When he was ten, the family immigrated to the United States, settling in the Pennsylvania mining town of Wilkes-Barre, where his parents ran a small store. As a boy, he endured antisemitic taunts and beatings.

== Marine service ==
After finishing high school and taking a bodybuilding course, Lenart enlisted in the United States Marine Corps. After 18 months of infantry training, he was accepted into flight school. During flight training, he was severely injured in a mid-air collision. He saw action in the Pacific Theater of World War II as an F4U Corsair pilot, serving in the Battle of Okinawa and in bombing missions over Japan. He was discharged from the Marines at the end of the war with the rank of captain.

== Israeli Air Force ==
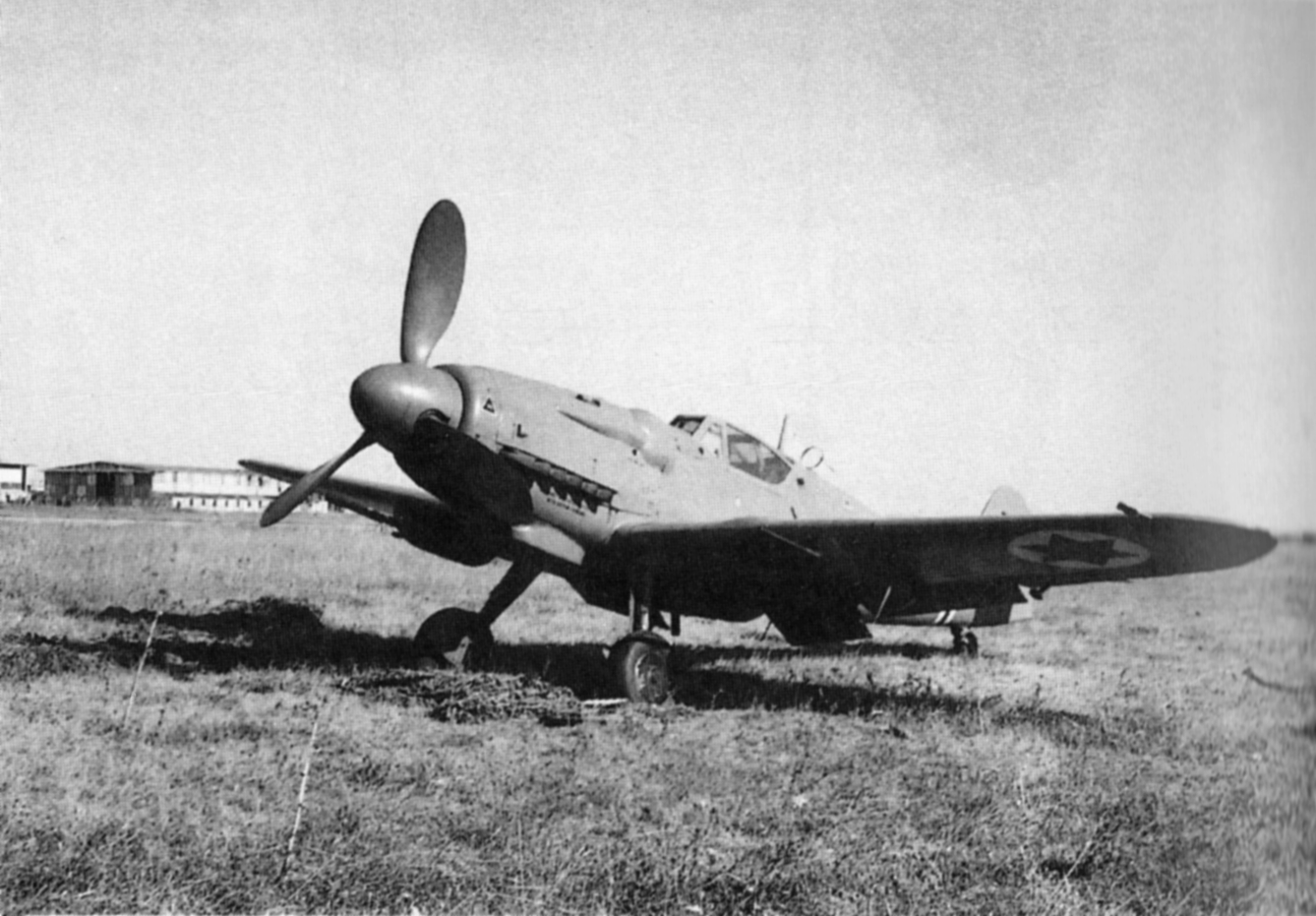
Israeli Avia S-199, 1948

After learning that 14 relatives including his grandmother had been murdered in the Auschwitz concentration camp and attending a lecture on Zionism, Lenart decided to volunteer for Sherut Avir, the precursor to the Israeli Air Force. He took part in the clandestine smuggling of salvaged Czech-supplied warplanes to Palestine shortly before Israeli independence, flying them past the British blockade. He became a fighter pilot following the Israeli Declaration of Independence and the outbreak of the 1948 Arab-Israeli War, flying the Avia S-199 fighter plane.

On May 29, 1948, Lenart took part in Operation Pleshet, when the Israeli Air Force launched its entire fleet of four fighter aircraft in a desperate attempt to halt an Egyptian advance on Tel Aviv, in coordination with a ground counterattack. This was the first use of Israeli fighter planes in combat, and Lenart, the most experienced of the pilots, commanded the mission. Although the attack was highly disorganized and did minimal damage, it had a profound psychological effect on the Egyptians, who had been assured that the Israelis had no aircraft. The Egyptian forces subsequently halted their advance and retreated.

== Later life ==
After the war, Lenart participated in Operation Ezra and Nehemiah, the airlift of Iraqi Jews to Israel in the early 1950s, served as a pilot for El Al, and flew aerial mapping missions over the jungles of Central America.

He produced six feature films. These include "Iron Eagle" and "Iron Eagle 2". Lenart's final movie project had the working title First Strike, and used Operation Opera, the 1981 attack on Iraq's reactor, as a story line. The script was written by his friend Lynn Garrison, who would also direct the aerial sequences.

Lenart was the general manager of the San Diego Clippers in the early 1980s. He maintained homes in Israel and Los Angeles, and upon his retirement, settled permanently in Israel.

Lenart died on July 20, 2015, at his home in Ra'anana, Israel, of congestive heart failure, at the age of 94. He was survived by his wife Rachel, his daughter Michal (who had also served in the Israeli Air Force) and a grandson.

== Decorations ==
Lenart received the following awards during his service with the U.S. Marine Corps:

Naval Aviator Badge
Air Medal w/ 5/16" Gold Star
Navy Presidential Unit Citation w/ 3/16" Bronze Star	Marine Corps Good Conduct Medal	American Defense Service Medal w/ 3/16" Bronze Star
American Campaign Medal	Asiatic-Pacific Campaign Medal w/ three 3/16" Bronze Stars	World War II Victory Medal

Lenart received the following decoration for his service in the Israeli Air Force:

War of Independence Ribbon
