= Yitzhak Pundak =

- יצחק פונדק
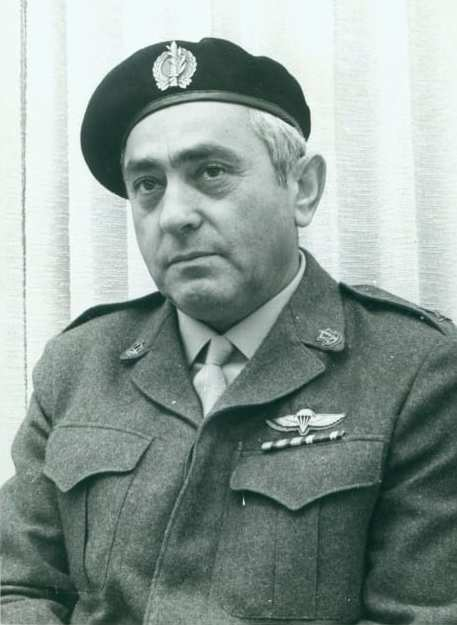
- Pundak in 1973
- Born: June 13, 1913; Kraków, Austro-Hungarian Empire (now Kraków, Poland)
- Died: August 27, 2017 (aged 104)
- Military career
- Allegiance: Israel
- Rank: Major General
- Commands: 53rd Battalion (Givati), Oded Brigade, Nahal, Armored Corps
- Conflicts: 1948 Arab–Israeli War, 1956 Sinai War
- Other work: Ambassador to Tanzania

Yitzhak Pundak (born Yitzhak Fundik Hebrew: יצחק פונדק; June 13, 1913 – August 27, 2017) was an Israeli general, diplomat and politician.

== Early life ==
Pundak was born in Kraków, Poland (then part of Austria-Hungary) and immigrated to the British Mandate of Palestine in 1933, from Poland.

== Military career ==
Pundak's armed service began with the Haganah. In 1945, he was an instructor in a platoon commanders' course.

In the 1948 Arab–Israeli War, Pundak served in the HISH and Israel Defense Forces as the commander of Givati Brigade's 53rd Battalion. He commanded the defense of the villages Nitzanim, Negba, Gat and Gal On, including what was seen as a failure and embarrassing surrender in the June 7, 1948 Battle of Nitzanim. In August 1948, he was appointed chief of the Oded Brigade and participated in Operation Yoav and Operation Hiram. In 1951, he founded the independent Nahal unit, which split from the Gadna program.

In 1952, Pundak traveled to France for a course in armored warfare and returned to the IDF to implement what he learned. He was appointed to head the Armored Corps on December 22, 1953, helping transform it into the Armored Conscriptions (Hebrew: גייסות השיריון) that employed a new doctrine of combining armored and motorized infantry units. The change was officially made on February 3, 1954, and Pundak was promoted to the rank of Brigadier General. He was pressured to end his tenure on July 26, 1956, replaced by Haim Laskov as the armored forces commander. During his lifetime he accused a certain officer within the armored corps of having exploited a failure in the Ordnance Corps and portrayed it as Pundak's personal failure. He also said that he had been promised the rank of Major General (Aluf) in 1959 but that the promise was broken. In 2013, upon turning 100, he received the rank.

In 1971, Pundak briefly returned to the IDF following an appointment by Defense Minister Moshe Dayan to the post of governor in the Sinai Peninsula and Gaza Strip, with the rank of Brigadier General. During his tenure, he proposed evacuating the Palestinian refugees from Gaza to a new city in the Sinai, but met strong opposition from the Southern Command chief Ariel Sharon.

=== Relations with Ariel Sharon ===
Pundak served with Major General Ariel Sharon in the Southern Command during his years as governor of the Sinai and Gaza. He generally disapproved of Sharon's actions, saying that Sharon "did one swinish thing after another". He also disagreed with Sharon's methods to fight Palestinian militancy in the Gaza Strip, and instead advocated improving the living conditions in the area. Shlomo Gazit, a retired IDF general and scholar, writes that the defense minister of the time, Moshe Dayan, created the civilian post of governor precisely to limit Sharon's jurisdiction, and appointed Pundak to the position to serve as "an excellent 'watchdog'". The plan had major drawbacks because the two administrations (Sharon's and Pundak's) were at odds and conflicting orders were issued, reducing the system's efficiency.

Despite this, Pundak advocated a unilateral disengagement plan from the Gaza Strip following the First Intifada, which was eventually carried out by Sharon in 2005. According to the September 2004 edition of The Washington Monthly, Pundak also criticized Yasser Arafat for not accepting Ehud Barak's peace proposal at the 2000 Camp David Summit, and said that he would be voting for Sharon in the next election.

== Public career ==
Pundak administrated the Arad Regional Council from June 1962, replacing Aryeh Eliav. In 1965, the Israeli government decided to create a local council in Arad and Pundak was made its first head. He was replaced by Ze'ev Haimoni after an election in 1966.

Pundak received his first senior diplomatic post in November 1965 when he was made the Israeli ambassador to Tanzania. He later served as the ambassador responsible for Guatemala and El Salvador, and as the head of the Jewish Agency's delegation to Argentina at the height of the Dirty War, after which he retired from all public posts.

== Published works ==
- Five Missions (2000; Hebrew: חמש משימות)
- A Man for All Generations (2005; Hebrew: אדם לכל עת)
- Givati Brigade – Battalion 53 (co-author), 2006;
