= Shimon Avidan =

Israeli soldier (1911–1994)

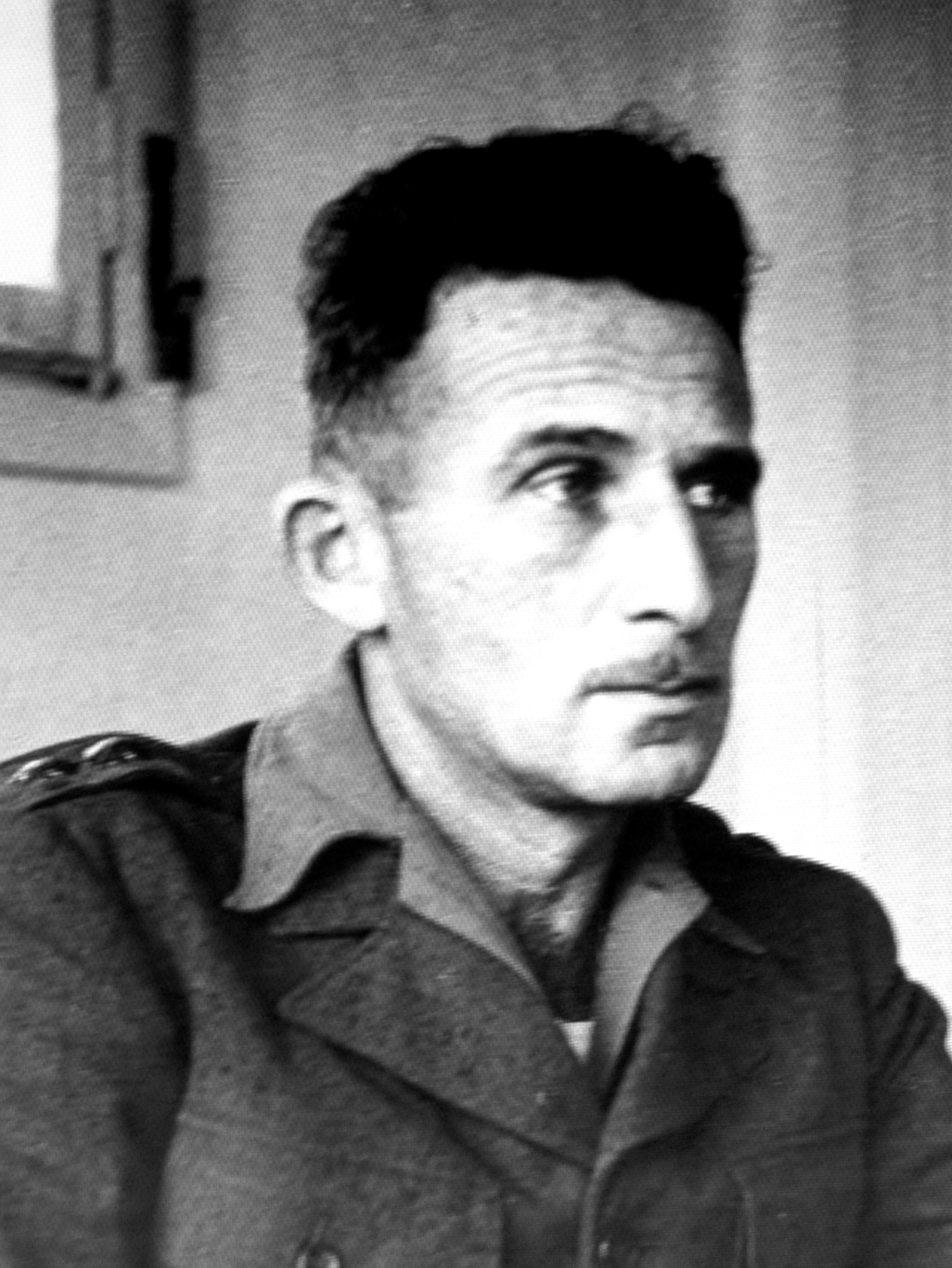
- Born: Siegbert Koch; February 7, 1911; Lissa, German Empire
- Died: September 11, 1994 (aged 83); Central District, Israel
- Military career
- Allegiance: Israel
- Commands: Palmach "German" platoon; Givati Brigade
- Conflicts: Spanish Civil War; Arab revolt in Palestine; World War II; Jewish insurgency in Mandatory Palestine; The Saison, Hametz; 1948 Arab–Israeli War; Nachshon, Barak, Pleshet, Nitzanim, An-Far, Death to the Invader, Yoav
- Other work: International Brigades

Signature
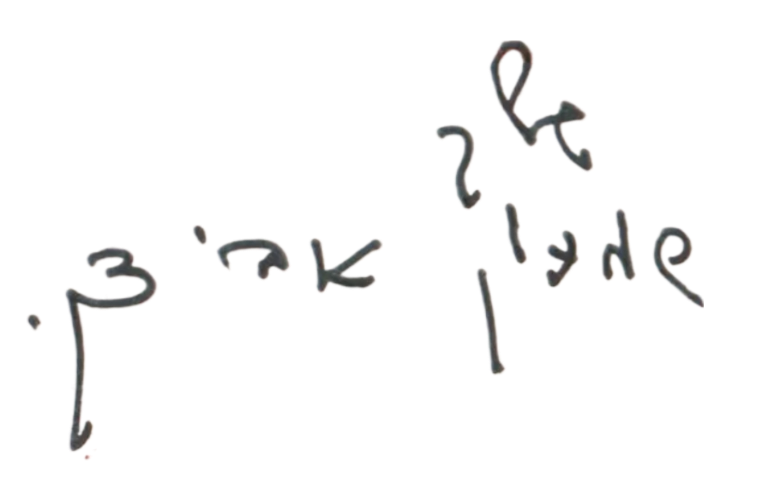

Shimon Avidan (Hebrew: שמעון אבידן; February 7, 1911 – September 11, 1994), born Siegbert Koch, was an Israeli military officer. He was the commander of the Givati Brigade during the 1948 Arab-Israeli war.

He was born in Lissa, Germany (today Leszno, Poland). He became involved in Communist activism in his youth, joined the Communist Party of Germany and later moved to Mandatory Palestine in 1934. He lived on Kibbutz Ayelet HaShahar and then Ein HaShofet. He fought with the International Brigades during the Spanish Civil War. He joined the Haganah and served in its Posh unit, and was an officer in the Special Night Squads established by Orde Wingate during the Arab revolt in Palestine. He also joined the Notrim.

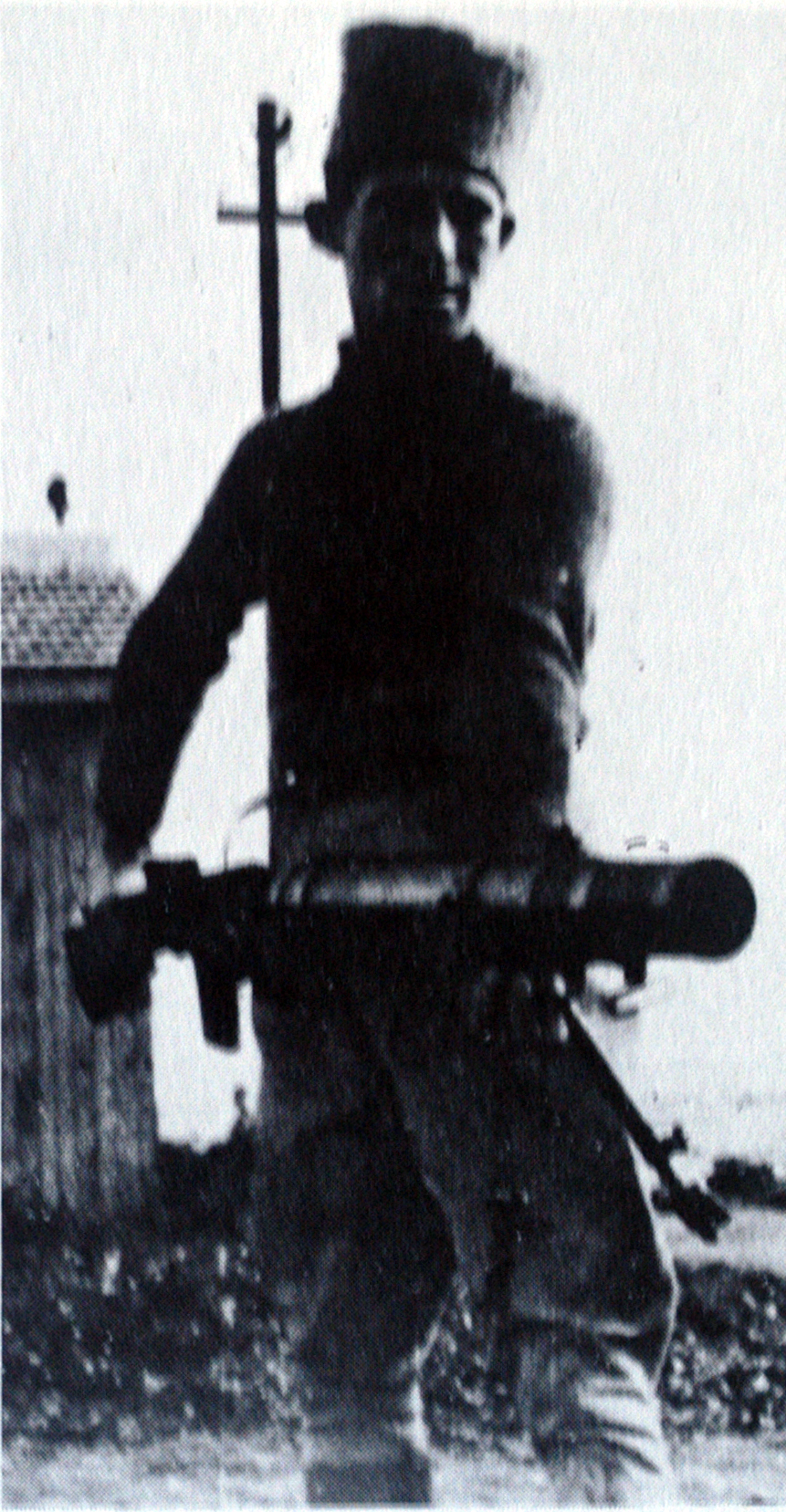
Avidan in 1940

In 1941, Avidan joined the Palmach. He led the "German Unit" of the Palmach, which was responsible for conducting guerrilla operations against the Axis powers. In 1945 he commanded the Saison operation against the Irgun and Lehi.

During the 1948 war he was the operational commander of Operation Nachshon and Operation Yoav. He commanded dozens of other operations and towards the end of the war was appointed head of the operations department of the General Staff.

He resigned from the army after, according to Chaim Herzog, "His extreme left-wing philosophy proved to be irreconcilable with David Ben-Gurion's policies." In 1975, he was appointed as the internal comptroller of the Ministry of Defense by the minister Shimon Peres.

Avidan died in 1994 at age 83.
