= Be'er Tuvia =

Moshav in southern Israel

Be'er Tuvia: בְּאֵר טוֹבִיָּה (Hebrew); بئر طوفيا (Arabic)

Hebrew transcription(s)
  - Standard: Be'er Tuviya
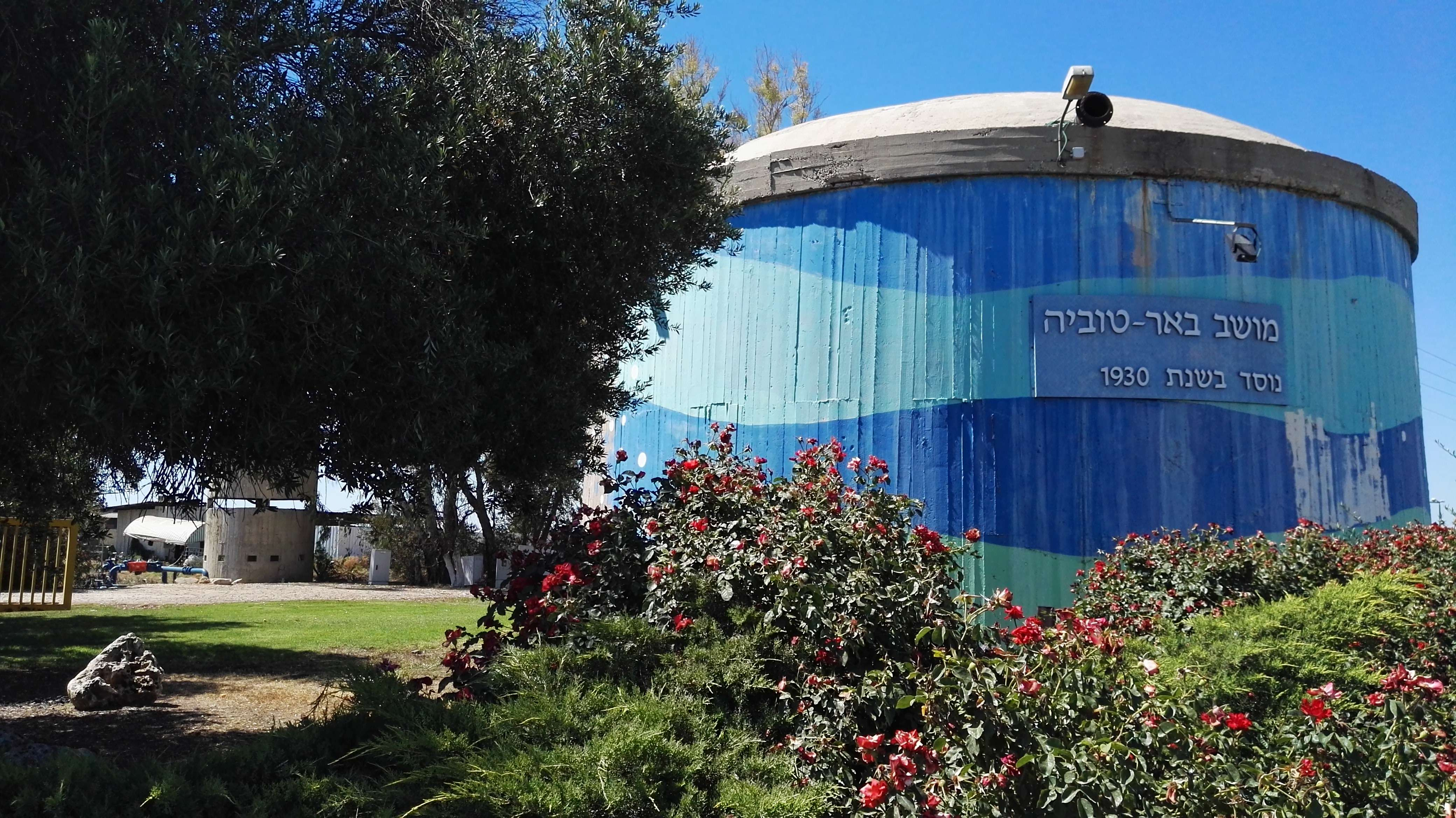

- Location within Ashkelon region of Israel Location within Israel
- Coordinates: 31°44′10″N 34°43′26″E
- Country: Israel
- District: Southern
- Subdistrict: Ashkelon
- Council: Be'er Tuvia
- Affiliation: Moshav Movement
- Founded: 1888
- Founder: Yisrael Hochman and other Zionists
- Population (2024): 1,495

Be'er Tuvia (Hebrew: בְּאֵר טוֹבִיָּה, Be'er Toviya, "Tuvia's Well") is a moshav in the Southern District of Israel. Located near the city of Kiryat Malakhi, it falls under the jurisdiction of Be'er Tuvia Regional Council. In 2024 its population was 1,495.

== History ==
In 1887, a group of First Aliyah pioneers from Bessarabia founded a moshava, which they named Qastina, after the neighboring Palestinian village of the same name. Although supported by Baron Edmond de Rothschild, the moshava did not prosper due to lack of water, distance from other Jewish centers, attacks by neighboring Arab villagers and strained relations between the settlers and the Baron's administration.

In 1896, the association of Hovevei Zion in Odesa purchased the land and new settlers came. Qastina was renamed Be'er Tuvia - an adaptation of the site's Arabic name, "Bir Ta'abya". In 1910, the moshava again faced financial collapse and some members approached the Jewish National Fund with a proposal that it buy the land and houses. The JNF agreed, but due to disagreement with Hovevei Zion this never happened. Instead, the JNF compensated farmers who left Be'er Tuvia and in 1913 brought farmers from Hulda to replace them. Within a short time, the moshava's situation was much improved.

According to the 1922 census of Palestine, conducted by the British Mandate authorities, Be'er Tuvia had a population of 112 inhabitants, all Jews.

The moshava was practically destroyed during the 1929 Palestine riots and had to be abandoned.

In 1930, it was founded anew as moshav by veterans of the Jewish Legion and kibbutzniks, mostly members of Kfar Giladi and Merhavia. By the time of the 1931 census, there were 62 occupied houses and a population of 206 Jews, 4 Christians and 2 Muslims. After a water source was discovered, Be'er Tuviya became one of the most prosperous moshavim in the country. During the Second World War, many of the moshav members joined the Jewish Brigade of the British Army. Among them was Israel Tal.

During the 1948 Arab–Israeli War, the moshav was used by the Israel Defense Forces as a base for the troops fighting Egypt in the Negev.

By 1990s the moshav economy was mainly based on citrus and intensive farming. Ben & Jerry's also manufactures ice cream at this location and their only factory in the Middle East.

== Notable residents ==
- Nehemia Levtzion (1935—2003), scholar of African history, Near East, Islamic, and African studies, President of the Open University of Israel, and executive director of the Van Leer Jerusalem Institute
- David Remez
- General Israel Tal, "father" of the Merkava tank
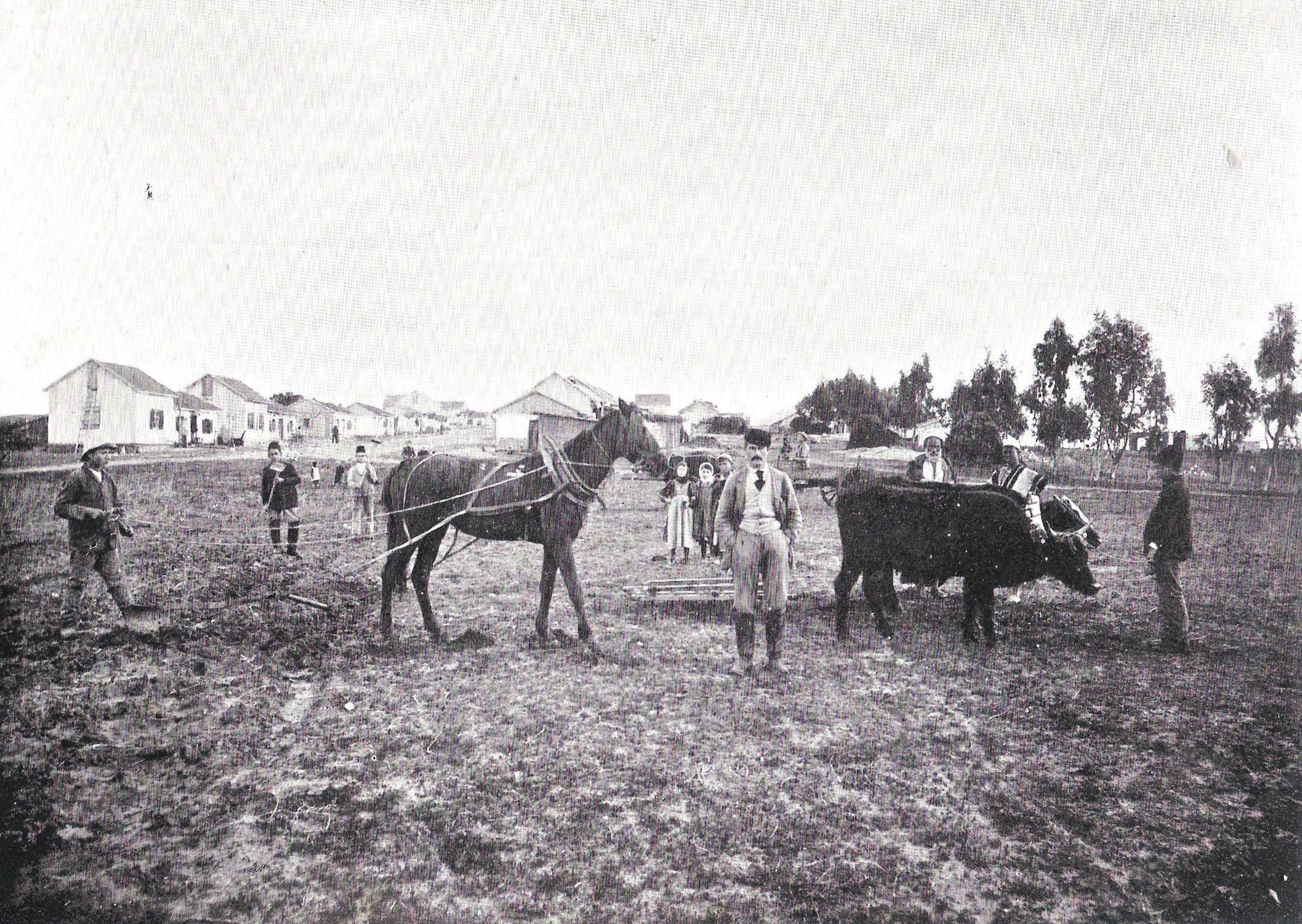
Be'er Tuvia circa 1888

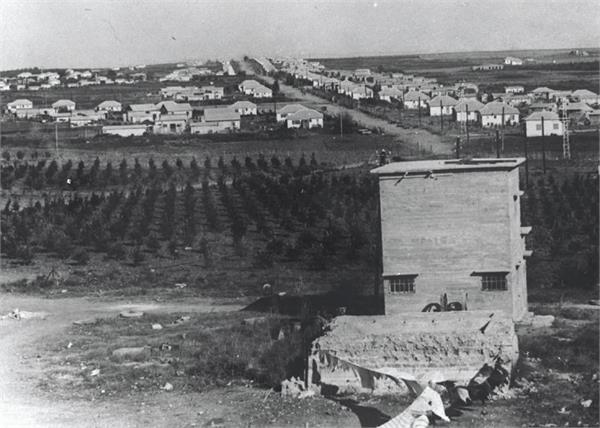
Be'er Tuvia 1937

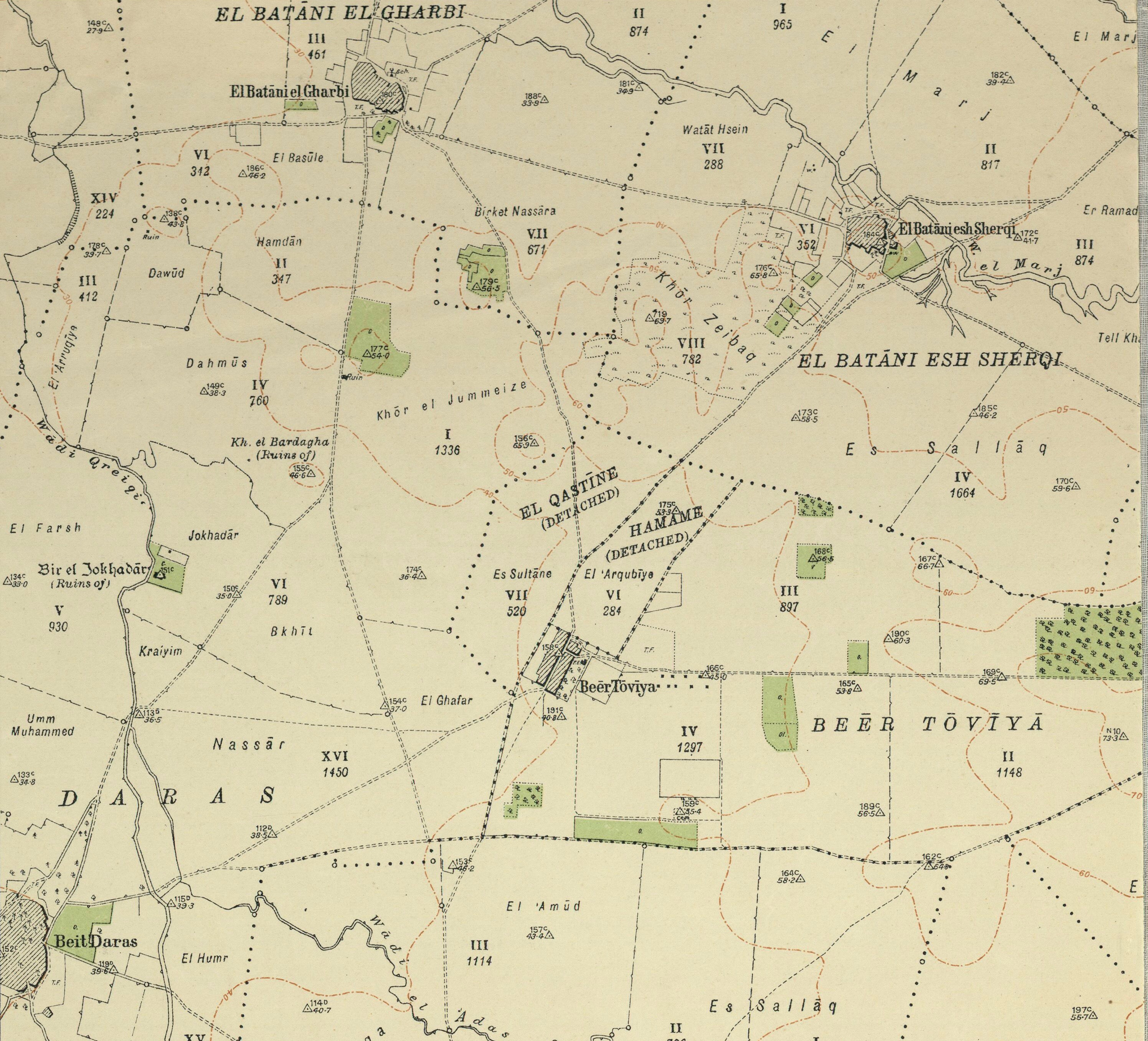
Be'er Tuvia 1930 1:20,000

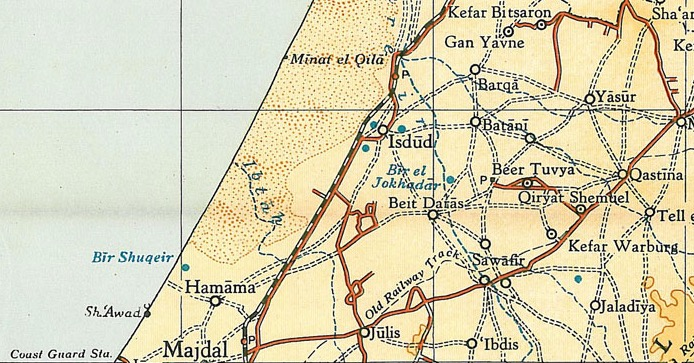
Be'er Tuvia 1945 1:250,000
