= August 1948 =

Month of 1948

<<	August 1948					>>
Su	Mo	Tu	We	Th	Fr	Sa
1	2	3	4	5	6	7
8	9	10	11	12	13	14
15	16	17	18	19	20	21
22	23	24	25	26	27	28
29	30	31

August 15: The Republic of Korea is Established

The following events occurred in August 1948:

== August 1, 1948 (Sunday) ==
- Air France Latécoère 631 disappearance: A Latécoère 631 of Air France went missing over the Atlantic Ocean and evidently crashed with the death of all 52 on board.
- Lee Beom-seok became 1st Prime Minister of South Korea.
- Dov Yosef was appointed Military Governor of Jerusalem by the Israeli government.

== August 2, 1948 (Monday) ==
- Diplomats Walter Bedell Smith of the US, Yves Chataigneau of France and Frank Roberts of the UK had a two-hour meeting in the Kremlin with Joseph Stalin to discuss the Berlin Blockade. Stalin stressed his opposition to the unification of Germany's western zones into a single governing body, but said he was willing to lift the blockade if implementation of the London agreement of May 31 was postponed pending further discussions among the Big Four powers.
- Israeli forces concluded Operation GYS 2 with the successful transport of goods to the Negev enclave.
- Born: Dennis Prager, radio talk show host, in New York City; Bob Rae, politician, in Ottawa, Canada

== August 3, 1948 (Tuesday) ==
- Time magazine editor Whittaker Chambers testified before the House Un-American Activities Committee that he had been part of a Communist underground organization prior to his leaving the movement in 1937. Chambers implicated a number of government officials as being part of his underground ring, including Alger and Donald Hiss, Nathan Witt and Lee Pressman.
- Born: Jean-Pierre Raffarin, Prime Minister of France 2002–2005, in Poitiers, France
- Died: Tommy Ryan, 78, American middleweight boxing champion

== August 4, 1948 (Wednesday) ==
- The New York Metropolitan Opera canceled its 1948-49 season after three of the twelve unions representing the organization's employees refused to accept contracts under the previous year's terms.
- Died: Mileva Marić, 72, Serbian mathematician and first wife of Albert Einstein

== August 5, 1948 (Thursday) ==
- Former US State Department official Alger Hiss voluntarily appeared before the House Un-American Activities Committee and denied under oath that he had ever been a Communist or known anybody by the name of Whittaker Chambers.
- US President Harry S. Truman said at a press conference that the Congressional spy hearings were yielding no information that had "not long been known to the FBI," and were just a "red herring" to distract the public from the Congress not getting anything done about the country's inflation problem.
- The Federal Communications Commission issued a statement threatening to crack down on the growing number of so-called "giveaway" programs - radio quiz shows that came dangerously close to violating lottery laws by offering prizes to listeners under systems that appeared to depend "upon lot or chance." The FCC publicized a set of new proposed rules, which among other restrictions would forbid giving "aid to answering the question correctly."
- The romantic comedy film Julia Misbehaves starring Greer Garson and Walter Pidgeon was released.

== August 6, 1948 (Friday) ==
- Egypt rejected Israel's proposal for direct peace negotiations on the Palestine situation. Acceptance of the proposal would have meant recognition of the Jewish state.
- Born: Dino Bravo, professional wrestler, as Adolfo Bresciano in Campobasso, Italy (d. 1993)
- Born: Deanna Booher professional wrestler, as Matilda the Hun in GLOW and Queen Kong in POWW (d. 2022)

== August 7, 1948 (Saturday) ==
- Torrential flooding of the Min River in the Chinese province of Fujian drowned 1,000 people and sent 1 million refugees to higher ground. The tragedy became the source of a war of words between the two sides in the Civil War, as the Nationalists blamed the Communists for destroying dikes while the Communists retorted that it was impossible to repair the dikes because of Nationalist attacks.
- The special extra session of the 80th United States Congress adjourned after passing only a fraction of the legislation President Truman had asked for.
- At a national convention in Ottawa, the Liberal Party of Canada elected Louis St. Laurent to succeed outgoing Prime Minister William Lyon Mackenzie King.
- Willem Drees became Prime Minister of the Netherlands.
- Domingo Díaz Arosemena became President of Panama.
- Born: Dan Halutz, commander of the Israeli Air Force, in Tel Aviv, Israel
- Died: Frederick Walker Baldwin, 66, Canadian aviation pioneer and the first Canadian to fly an airplane

== August 8, 1948 (Sunday) ==
- The Eighth Lambeth Conference of the Anglican Communion ended after five weeks of deliberations in Lambeth, England. Archbishop of York Cyril Garbett said in his closing sermon that "with the discovery and use of the atomic bomb, we live more nearly in the mental and spiritual atmosphere of the first Christians who expected at any time the end of the world."
- Died: Leo M. Franklin, 78, American Reform rabbi

== August 9, 1948 (Monday) ==
- In Quito, Ecuador, delegates representing Colombia, Panama, Venezuela and Ecuador signed a charter for a new customs union.
- A group of sixteen young Québécois artists released the anti-establishment manifesto Le Refus Global (Total Refusal), calling for "an untamed need for liberation" and "resplendent anarchy".
- Born: Claudia Blum, psychologist and politician, in Cali, Colombia

== August 10, 1948 (Tuesday) ==
- An armor-plated Mercedes-Benz that Adolf Hitler once presented to Baron Mannerheim of Finland was driven through Times Square at the beginning of a nationwide tour of the United States. The long black automobile was scheduled to stop at recruitment centers throughout the country to encourage enlistment in the US military.
- The hidden camera/practical joke reality television series Candid Camera premiered on ABC, the year after it initially began on radio as The Candid Microphone.
- Died: Kan'ichi Asakawa, 74, Japanese historian; Lucille Bogan, 51, American blues singer; Beatrice Edgell, 75, British psychologist and professor

== August 11, 1948 (Wednesday) ==
- In further testimony before the House Un-American Activities Committee, Elizabeth Bentley described an incident in October 1945 in which she was paid $2000 for her spy work by first secretary of the Russian Embassy Anatoly Gromov. Bentley said the cash payoff happened by the New York waterfront and was probably witnessed by agents of the FBI, who had instructed Bentley to maintain her contacts with the Communists while it watched.
- The Pohl trial ended at Nuremberg with the tribunal issuing its final sentences.

== August 12, 1948 (Thursday) ==
- The Babrra massacre occurred in Pakistan when unarmed workers of the Khudai Khidmatgar movement were fired upon by the government of the North-West Frontier Province. Estimates of those killed range as high as 600 people.
- An international incident began when Soviet consular employee Oksana Kasenkina jumped from a third-floor window of the Soviet consulate in New York City, injuring herself critically. Kasenkina, who had been in New York for three years as a tutor for the consulate's children, was taken to Roosevelt Hospital where she regained consciousness several hours later and told police that she did not want to see anyone from the Russian consulate.
- Born: Mizengo Pinda, 9th Prime Minister of Tanzania, in Rukwa, Tanzania

== August 13, 1948 (Friday) ==
- The United Nations Commission for India and Pakistan adopted a three-part resolution (amending and amplifying Security Council Resolution 47 from April), calling for a ceasefire in the Kashmir conflict and for the governments of India and Pakistan to agree to enter consultation with the Commission to determine the future status of the disputed region in accordance with the will of the people.
- Lauchlin Currie and Harry Dexter White appeared before the House Un-American Activities Committee and denied under oath that they were ever members of, or had any knowledge of, any Communist spy rings before or during the war.
- Born: Kathleen Battle, operatic soprano, in Portsmouth, Ohio
- Died: Elaine Hammerstein, 51, American actress

== August 14, 1948 (Saturday) ==
- The 1948 Summer Olympics closed in London. The United States finished atop the medal count with 38 gold medals and 84 total.
- 1948 Ashes series: Australian cricket team in England in 1948: Australian batsman Don Bradman, playing his last Test cricket match, against England at The Oval in London, was bowled by Eric Hollies for a duck (leaving his career Test batting average at 99.94); however, Australia won the match by an innings and 149 runs, and The Ashes 4–0.
- The States' Rights Democratic Party formally adopted its platform at Oklahoma City, affirming its pro-segregation policy and condemning the Democratic civil rights program.
- Mile High Stadium opened in Denver, Colorado, under its original name of Bears Stadium.
- "You Call Everybody Darlin'" by Al Trace and His Orchestra hit #1 on the Billboard singles charts.
- Born: Joseph Marcell, actor and comedian, in Saint Lucia

== August 15, 1948 (Sunday) ==
- The First Republic of South Korea was established.
- Juan Natalicio González was sworn in as President of Paraguay.
- Born: Tom Johnston, guitarist and lead singer of The Doobie Brothers, in Visalia, California

== August 16, 1948 (Monday) ==
- President Truman signed an anti-inflation bill authorizing him to restrict bank credit and reimpose wartime consumer credit controls, but he called it a "tiny fraction of what we need."
- The Northrop F-89 Scorpion interceptor jet had its first flight.
- Died: Babe Ruth, 53, American baseball player

== August 17, 1948 (Tuesday) ==
- An estimated 25,000 people filed past the coffin of Babe Ruth lying in state for the first of two days at Yankee Stadium.
- Born: Alexander Ivashkin, cellist, in Blagoveshchensk, USSR (d. 2014); Edward Lazear, economist, in New York City (d. 2020)
- Died: Mariette Rheiner Garner, 79, Second Lady of the United States 1933–41

== August 18, 1948 (Wednesday) ==
- The Soviet Union vetoed Ceylon's application for membership in the United Nations, saying it was still dominated by Britain.
- The Yugoslavian Interior Ministry issued a report announcing that Colonel General Arso Jovanović had been shot and killed by border guards on August 12 while attempting to flee into Romania.

== August 19, 1948 (Thursday) ==
- At the intersection of the Soviet, American and British zones of Berlin's Potsdamer Platz, police from the Soviet sector opened fire on a crowd of black marketers who were resisting arrest by throwing stones at them. About twenty people were injured in the disturbance.
- Babe Ruth's funeral was held at St. Patrick's Cathedral in Manhattan. 75,000 people stood in the rain to watch the funeral procession of twenty-five automobiles wind its way to the Gate of Heaven Cemetery.
- A sitdown strike at Toho film studio in Tokyo ended after the studio was surrounded by 2,000 police and a platoon of U.S. Eighth Army soldiers.
- Born: Tipper Gore, Second Lady of the United States 1993–2001, in Washington, D.C.; Christy O'Connor Jnr, golfer, in County Galway, Ireland (d. 2016)

== August 20, 1948 (Friday) ==
- Lee Pressman, John Abt and Nathan Witt refused on constitutional grounds to give any testimony to the House Un-American Activities Committee concerning their alleged involvement in Communist spy rings.
- The US government ordered the expulsion of Jacob M. Lomakin, Soviet consul general in New York, for improper conduct in connection with the case of Oksana Kasenkina. The State Department's diplomatic note cited Lomakin pressuring Kasenkina to make false statements to the press claiming that she had been kidnapped by the Americans.
- Born: John Noble, actor and theatre director, in Port Pirie, Australia; Robert Plant, lead singer of the rock band Led Zeppelin, in West Bromwich, England; Barbara Allen Rainey, first female pilot in the U.S. armed forces, in Bethesda, Maryland (d. 1982)
- Died: Emery Roth, 76 or 77, Austro-Hungarian-born American architect

- Default date used in video game Homebrew - Patent Unknown

== August 21, 1948 (Saturday) ==
- "Axis Sally" Mildred Gillars was flown under guard in a C-54 military transport plane from Frankfurt, Germany to Washington, DC to face charges of treason for broadcasting Nazi propaganda during the war.
- Ray Sprigle, who spent a month disguised as a Negro in the Southern United States, concluded a 12-day series of articles about his experience published in the Pittsburgh Post-Gazette. Sprigle's investigation predated the similarly-themed John Howard Griffin book Black Like Me by a full decade.

== August 22, 1948 (Sunday) ==
- The Israel Defense Forces launched Operation Betzer (Strength), aimed at rounding up draft dodgers and deserters. Over the next five days Tel Aviv was put under curfew, all exits from the city were blocked and a total of 2,794 citizens were arrested.
- In Berlin, Soviet military police arrested Thomas Headen, deputy chief of the US military information division, for strolling across the demarcation line of the British and Soviet zones in the Potsdamerplatz area while carrying a camera. Headen would be released the following day.
- Born: Peter James, crime fiction author, in Brighton, England
- Died: Josef Bühler, 44, German Nazi legal officer (hanged as a war criminal); Sophia Duleep Singh, 72, British suffragette

== August 23, 1948 (Monday) ==
- The World Council of Churches was founded in Amsterdam by 450 religious leaders representing Protestant and Orthodox churches from 42 countries.
- Israeli forces launched Operation Avak, with the objective of sending supplies to the Israeli enclave in the northwestern Negev desert by air.
- The prototype McDonnell XF-85 Goblin fighter plane had its first flight, but it would never go into full production.
- The New York Metropolitan Opera saved its season after a compromise agreement was announced with the twelve unions representing the organization's employees.
- Detective Comics #140 (cover date October 1948) was published, marking the first appearance of the supervillain the Riddler.

== August 24, 1948 (Tuesday) ==
- South Korean President Syngman Rhee and military governor John R. Hodge signed an agreement providing for American assistance in equipping and training South Korean security forces.
- In response to the Lomakin expulsion, the Soviet Union ordered its two US consulates (in New York City and San Francisco) closed and requested that the US close its only consulate in the USSR (at Vladivostok).
- Born: Jean-Michel Jarre, composer and record producer, in Lyon, France; Sauli Niinistö, 12th President of Finland, in Salo, Finland; Tito Sotto, politician and actor, in Manila, Philippines

== August 25, 1948 (Wednesday) ==
- Alger Hiss and Whittaker Chambers jointly testified before the House Un-American Activities Committee and stuck to their conflicting stories.
- The four-day World Congress of Intellectuals in Defense of Peace opened at the Wrocław University of Technology in Poland.
- Yugoslavia accused neighboring Romania of trying to bring about a revolution to overthrow Marshal Tito.
- The Salta earthquake occurred in northwest Argentina, resulting in 2 casualties.
- A tornado in Hamilton, "New Zealand’s deadliest recorded tornado", destroying around 150 buildings and resulting in 80 casualties.
- Born: Tony Ramos, actor, in Arapongas, Brazil

== August 26, 1948 (Thursday) ==
- 5,000 Berlin Communists occupied the City Hall, located in the Soviet sector of the city, in order to prevent the predominantly non-Communist City Assembly from meeting.
- The crime thriller film Rope, directed by Alfred Hitchcock and starring James Stewart, premiered in New York City.
- The western film Red River, directed by Howard Hawks and starring John Wayne and Montgomery Clift, premiered in Texas, Oklahoma and Kansas.

== August 27, 1948 (Friday) ==
- In Cheltenham, England at the final session of the International Congress on Population and World Resources in Relation to the Family, a four-nation committee (US, Britain, the Netherlands and Sweden) was established to promote birth control on an international scale.
- Born: Sgt. Slaughter, professional wrestler, as Robert Remus in Detroit, Michigan
- Died: Charles Evans Hughes, 86, Governor of New York, Chief Justice of the United States and 1916 Republican presidential candidate

== August 28, 1948 (Saturday) ==
- The House Un-American Activities Committee issued an interim report claiming that numerous Communist espionage rings had infiltrated the American government during World War II.
- "Twelfth Street Rag" by Pee Wee Hunt and His Orchestra topped the Billboard singles charts for the first of eight non-consecutive weeks.
- The runoff election in the Democratic Party's primary election during the 1948 United States Senate election in Texas (won by future President Lyndon B. Johnson) takes place.

== August 29, 1948 (Sunday) ==
- Northwest Airlines Flight 421, a Martin 2-0-2 passenger plane flying from Chicago to Minneapolis crashed near Fountain City, Wisconsin due to structural failure in its left wing. All 33 passengers and 4 crew aboard perished.
- The Law on Organization of National Defense was promulgated in South Korea, reorganizing the Korean Constabulary and Coast Guard into the army and navy.

== August 30, 1948 (Monday) ==
- Registration began for the second US peacetime draft, with 25-year old men the first to be enrolled.
- Born: Lewis Black, comedian, actor and author, in Washington, D.C.; Fred Hampton, activist and revolutionary, in Summit, Illinois (d. 1969); Victor Skumin, scientist, in Penza Oblast, USSR

== August 31, 1948 (Tuesday) ==
- A new record one-day total of 4,836 tons of supplies were airlifted into Berlin by 694 British and American planes.
- Actor Robert Mitchum, actress Lila Leeds and two others were arrested in a drug raid on a house in Laurel Canyon and charged with possession of marijuana.
- The cartoon character the shmoo appeared for the first time in the Li'l Abner comic strip.
- Born: Holger Osieck, football manager, in Duisburg, Germany
- Died: Andrei Zhdanov, 52, Russian Soviet politician
