= October 1948 =

Month of 1948

<<	October 1948					>>
Su	Mo	Tu	We	Th	Fr	Sa
					1	2
3	4	5	6	7	8	9
10	11	12	13	14	15	16
17	18	19	20	21	22	23
24	25	26	27	28	29	30
31

The following events occurred in October 1948:

== October 1, 1948 (Friday) ==
- In Thailand, conspirators in the Army General Staff Plot to overthrow the government began being arrested.
- The Supreme Court of California decided Perez v. Sharp, striking down the state's ban on interracial marriage as a violation of the Fourteenth Amendment to the United States Constitution.
- The UFO incident known as the Gorman dogfight occurred in the skies over Fargo, North Dakota.
- The novel The Young Lions by Irwin Shaw was published.
- Born: Peter Blake, yachtsman, in Auckland, New Zealand (d. 2001)
- Died: Phraya Manopakorn Nititada, 64, 1st Prime Minister of Siam

== October 2, 1948 (Saturday) ==
- Bukken Bruse disaster: A Short Sandringham flying boat crashed during a landing attempt in the bay near Hommelvik, Norway, killing 19 of the 45 aboard. British philosopher Bertrand Russell was among the survivors.
- The Soviet Union asked the United Nations General Assembly for a resolution to outlaw the atomic bomb and establish international control of atomic energy.
- Born: Avery Brooks, actor, director, singer and educator, in Evansville, Indiana; Donna Karan, fashion designer, in Queens, New York; Persis Khambatta, model and actress, in Bombay, India (d. 1998); Chris LeDoux, country musician and rodeo champion, in Biloxi, Mississippi (d. 2005)

== October 3, 1948 (Sunday) ==
- The Israeli government said it would not accept any plan that would separate any part of the Negev desert region from Israel.
- The Major League Baseball regular season ended with a tie atop the American League between the Cleveland Indians and Boston Red Sox, forcing a one-game tie-breaker for the following day.

== October 4, 1948 (Monday) ==
- Field Marshal Sir Bernard Montgomery was named head of the Western European defense organization, with French General Jean de Lattre de Tassigny, British Air Marshal Sir James Robb and French Vice Admiral Robert Jaujard as his aides.
- 300,000 French coal miners went on a Communist-directed strike.
- The 1948 American League tie-breaker game was played between the Cleveland Indians and Boston Red Sox at Fenway Park. The Indians won 8-3 to advance to the World Series.
- The radio series The Railroad Hour premiered on ABC.
- Born: Iain Hewitson, chef, restarauteur and television personality, in Ōtaki, New Zealand; Linda McMahon, professional wrestling magnate and politician, in New Bern, North Carolina
- Died: Jan Savitt, 41, American bandleader (cerebral hemorrhage)

== October 5, 1948 (Tuesday) ==
- The 1948 Ashgabat earthquake occurred in Turkmenistan near Ashgabat. Due to Soviet government censorship the event was not widely reported, and estimates of casualties vary from 10,000 to as many as 110,000.
- The UN Security Council voted 9-2 to place the question of the Berlin Blockade on its agenda, over the protests of the Soviet and Ukrainian delegates who declared they would not participate in any discussions on the matter.
- The Taiyuan Campaign began during the Chinese Civil War.
- Born:
  - Russell Mael, American rock singer (Sparks), in Los Angeles
  - Delroy Wilson, ska, rocksteady and reggae musician, in Kingston, Jamaica (d. 1995)
- Died: Rupert Gould, 57, British Navy officer

== October 6, 1948 (Wednesday) ==
- 1948 Georgia USAF Boeing B-29 crash: A Boeing B-29 Superfortress crashed in Waycross, Georgia after an engine fire broke out, killing 9 of the 13 aboard.
- The Tennessee Williams play Summer and Smoke had its Broadway premiere at the Music Box Theatre.
- Born: Gerry Adams, leader of the Sinn Féin political party, in Belfast, Northern Ireland; Glenn Branca, avant-garde composer and guitarist, in Harrisburg, Pennsylvania (d. 2018)

== October 7, 1948 (Thursday) ==
- The Battle of Jinzhou began during the Chinese Civil War.
- The cabinet of Japanese Prime Minister Hitoshi Ashida resigned amid a corruption scandal involving government loans to the Showa Denko company.
- The stage musical Love Life by Kurt Weill and Alan Jay Lerner opened at the 46th Street Theatre on Broadway.
- Born: Diane Ackerman, poet and naturalist, in Waukegan, Illinois

== October 8, 1948 (Friday) ==
- Cuba, Egypt and Norway were elected to two-year terms on the UN Security Council, replacing Belgium, Colombia and Syria.
- Israel announced the signing of contracts with the Shell and Socony-Vacuum oil companies, guaranteeing the new country an adequate oil supply.
- Born: Gottfried Helnwein, visual artist, in Vienna, Austria; Johnny Ramone, guitarist of the punk band the Ramones, as John Cummings in Forest Hills, Queens, New York (d. 2004); Baldwin Spencer, 3rd Prime Minister of Antigua and Barbuda, in St. John's, Antigua and Barbuda

== October 9, 1948 (Saturday) ==
- At a Conservative Party conference in Llandudno, Wales, Winston Churchill urged the United States not to destroy its reserve of nuclear weapons. "The Western nations will be far more likely to reach a lasting settlement without bloodshed if they formulate their just demands while they have the atomic power and before the Russian Communists have got it too," Churchill said.
- "A Tree in the Meadow" by Margaret Whiting topped the Billboard singles charts.
- Born: Jackson Browne, singer-songwriter, in Heidelberg, Germany; Ciaran Carson, poet and novelist, in Belfast, Northern Ireland (d. 2019); Oliver Hart, economist and Nobel Prize laureate, in London, England
- Died: Joseph Wedderburn, 66, Scottish mathematician

== October 10, 1948 (Sunday) ==
- The Battle of Tashan in the Chinese Civil War began.
- Carlos Prío Socarrás became President of Cuba.
- A general election was held in Honduras. Juan Manuel Gálvez of the National Party was elected president with 99.85% of the vote when the opposition Liberal Party boycotted the polls.

== October 11, 1948 (Monday) ==
- The 1948 Commonwealth Prime Ministers' Conference opened in London.
- The Cleveland Indians defeated the Boston Braves 4-3 to win the World Series, four games to two.
- Born: Cecilia, singer-songwriter, in El Pardo, Madrid, Spain (d. 1976); Cynthia Clawson, gospel singer, in Houston, Texas

== October 12, 1948 (Tuesday) ==
- Dwight D. Eisenhower was formally installed as 13th President of Columbia University in an open-air ceremony attended by more than 19,000 people.
- The New York Yankees announced that Casey Stengel would succeed Bucky Harris as manager of the team for 1949. The announcement came as a shock to many, as Stengel did not have a very distinguished managerial record and had a reputation as something of a clown.
- The debate programme Any Questions? premiered on BBC Radio.
- Born: Rick Parfitt, guitarist and singer of the rock band Status Quo, in Woking, Surrey, England (d. 2016)
- Died: Susan Sutherland Isaacs, 63, English educational physiologist and psychoanalyst

== October 13, 1948 (Wednesday) ==
- The Berlin City Assembly formally moved its meetings from the Soviet to the British sector.
- The film noir Night Has a Thousand Eyes starring Edward G. Robinson, Gail Russell and John Lund premiered in New York.
- Born: John Ford Coley, musician and half of the musical duo England Dan & John Ford Coley, in Dallas, Texas; Nusrat Fateh Ali Khan, musician, in Faisalabad, Pakistan (d. 1997)
- Died: Samuel S. Hinds, 73, American actor and lawyer

== October 14, 1948 (Thursday) ==
- The West German Constituent Assembly meeting in Bonn decided that the new west German state would be named the Federal Republic of Germany.
- The drama film Johnny Belinda starring Jane Wyman (in an Oscar-winning role), Lew Ayres and Charles Bickford had its official world premiere at the Warner Hollywood Theatre in Los Angeles. To promote the film, a poll had been conducted of the nation's movie editors to name the actresses who had given the greatest film performances of all time, who would be invited as guests of honor. Of the 42 actresses named, Bette Davis topped the poll with one vote more than Greta Garbo.
- The Australian play Rusty Bugles by Sumner Locke Elliott premiered at the Independent Theatre in Sydney. The play was controversial for its coarse language and gained notoriety when it was threatened with closure for obscenity.
- Born: David Ruprecht, actor and game show host, in St. Louis, Missouri
- Died: Duchess Marie of Mecklenburg, 70

== October 15, 1948 (Friday) ==
- Major General William H. Tunner assumed command of the newly created Combined Airlift Task Force during the Berlin Airlift.
- Israeli forces began Operation Yoav with the goal of driving a wedge between Egyptian forces. The Battles of the Separation Corridor began.
- Gerald Ford and Betty Ford are married.
- Shigeru Yoshida became Prime Minister of Japan.
- The Battle of Jinzhou ended in the fall of Jinzhou to the Communists.
- The Battle of Tashan ended in Communist victory.
- A denazification court in Munich declared Adolf Hitler's will invalid and ordered his property and assets confiscated.
- Born: Renato Corona, 23rd Chief Justice of the Supreme Court of the Philippines, in Manila, Philippines (d. 2016); Chris de Burgh, British-Irish singer and songwriter, in Venado Tuerto, Argentina
- Died: Edythe Chapman, 85, American stage and silent film actress

== October 16, 1948 (Saturday) ==
- The Philippine Department of Justice outlawed the Communist Party of the Philippines.
- Died: Modi Alon, 27, Israeli fighter pilot (plane crash)

== October 17, 1948 (Sunday) ==
- 29 crewmen of the British aircraft carrier HMS Illustrious drowned in Portland Harbour when a pinnace capsized and sank in rough seas.
- Born: Robert Jordan, fantasy author, as James Rigney Jr. in Charleston, South Carolina (d. 2007); Margot Kidder, actress, in Yellowknife, Northwest Territories, Canada (d. 2018); George Wendt, actor, in Chicago, Illinois (d. 2025)

== October 18, 1948 (Monday) ==
- Soviet authorities in Germany began arming a new German police force and imposed new traffic restrictions to prevent the smuggling of food and other rationed goods into West Berlin.
- Winchell's Donuts was founded in Temple City, California.
- Born: Hans Köchler, philosopher, in Schwaz, Austria
- Died: Walther von Brauchitsch, 67, German field marshal

== October 19, 1948 (Tuesday) ==
- The Siege of Changchun ended with the fall of the city of Changchun to Communist forces.
- Presidents North Carolina Gave the Nation, a monument honoring three presidents of the United States, was dedicated at the North Carolina State Capitol in Raleigh, North Carolina.
- Born: Patrick Simmons, guitarist for The Doobie Brothers, in Aberdeen, Washington

== October 20, 1948 (Wednesday) ==
- The KLM Constellation air disaster killed 40 people near Glasgow Prestwick Airport in Scotland.
- By a vote of 39-6, the Soviet proposal to outlaw the atomic bomb and create an international control agency was soundly defeated in the Political committee of the UN General Assembly.
- The Technicolor adventure film The Three Musketeers starring Gene Kelly and Lana Turner was released.

== October 21, 1948 (Thursday) ==
- The Battle of Beersheba was fought, resulting in Israeli victory.
- Operation Avak ended when a land corridor was created between the Negev and the rest of Israel.
- The George Bernard Shaw play Buoyant Billions had its world premiere at the Schauspielhaus in Zürich, Switzerland.
- Born: Tom Everett, actor, in Portland, Oregon; Allen Henry Vigneron, Archbishop of Detroit, in Mount Clemens, Michigan; Bill Russell, baseball player, in Pittsburg, Kansas
- Died: Elissa Landi, 43, Italian-born American actress (cancer)

== October 22, 1948 (Friday) ==
- A new UN-brokered ceasefire began in the Arab–Israeli War, the third since the conflict started.
- Operation Yoav ended.
- The 1948 Commonwealth Prime Ministers' Conference ended in London.
- Chester Carlson's invention of xerography was demonstrated to a technical society in Detroit.
- Born: Lynette "Squeaky" Fromme, attempted assassin of Gerald Ford, in Santa Monica, California

== October 23, 1948 (Saturday) ==
- 2,000 French troops seized seven of the nation's largest coal mines after three days of strike-related violence.
- Born:
  - Feisal Abdul Rauf, Egyptian-American Sufi imam, author and activist, in Kuwait
  - Gerry Robinson, business executive and television presenter, in Dunfanaghy, Ireland (d. 2021)

== October 24, 1948 (Sunday) ==
- The Soviet Union announced a massive fifteen-year land reclamation project covering almost 300 million acres of land in western Russia and Siberia.
- Pope Pius XII promulgated In multiplicibus curis, an encyclical expressing concern at the danger of destruction of holy sites during the Arab-Israeli War.
- Died: Franz Lehár, 78, Austro-Hungarian composer

== October 25, 1948 (Monday) ==
- The US Supreme Court in a 4-4 split upheld the New York obscenity ban of Edmund Wilson's Memoirs of Hecate County.
- Benito Mussolini's memoirs were posthumously published under the title "The Fall of Mussolini: His Own Story."
- Born: Dave Cowens, basketball player and coach, in Newport, Kentucky; Dan Gable, Olympic wrestler and coach, in Waterloo, Iowa; Dan Issel, basketball player and coach, in Batavia, Illinois

== October 26, 1948 (Tuesday) ==
- Foreign ministers of western Europe meeting in Paris announced plans to form a North Atlantic defensive alliance together with the United States and Canada.
- Franklin D. Roosevelt's Little White House in Warm Springs, Georgia was dedicated as a national shrine.
- Born: Toby Harrah, baseball player, in Sissonville, West Virginia
- Died: Elsa Ehrich, 34, German Nazi concentration camp guard (executed for war crimes)

== October 27, 1948 (Wednesday) ==
- Five Peruvian army regiments revolted in Arequipa and proclaimed a provisional government opposed to President José Bustamante y Rivero.
- 1948 Donora smog: in one of the worst air pollution events in US history, a fog began building up in the mill town of Donora, Pennsylvania that would kill 20 people and sicken 7,000 over the next few days.
- Doris Duke, reputed to be the wealthiest woman in the world, won an uncontested divorce from Dominican diplomat Porfirio Rubirosa in Reno, Nevada.

== October 28, 1948 (Thursday) ==
- The Al-Dawayima massacre took place during the Arab–Israeli War.
- The High Command Trial ended in Nuremberg. Of the original fourteen defendants, two were acquitted of charges and Johannes Blaskowitz had committed suicide during the trial; the remaining defendants were given prison sentences ranging from three years to life.
- The Flag of Israel was adopted.
- Boston Braves shortstop Alvin Dark was named Major League Baseball Rookie of the Year.
- Born: Telma Hopkins, singer and actress, in Louisville, Kentucky

== October 29, 1948 (Friday) ==
- José Bustamante y Rivero was overthrown as President of Peru when the army revolt spread to the capital city of Lima. Peruvian radio announced that a military junta had taken over the government.
- Israeli forces launched Operation Hiram, aimed at capturing the Upper Galilee region.
- The Safsaf massacre occurred in which 52-64 inhabitants of the Arab village of Safsaf were killed by members of the Israel Defense Forces.
- Born: Kate Jackson, actress, director and producer, in Birmingham, Alabama

== October 30, 1948 (Saturday) ==
- Non-Communist French coal miners resumed work after accepting a 15% pay raise and increased family benefits. Members of the Communist-led General Confederation of Labour remained on strike.
- Republican presidential nominee Thomas E. Dewey ended his campaign with a speech before 19,000 in Madison Square Garden.
- The Eilabun massacre took place when 14 men from the Christian village of Eilabun were executed by Israeli forces after the village had surrendered.
- A luzzu fishing boat which was overloaded with passengers capsized and sank in the Gozo Channel off Qala, Gozo, Malta, killing 23 of the 27 people on board.
- Born: Garry McDonald, actor and comedian, in Glen Innes, New South Wales, Australia

== October 31, 1948 (Sunday) ==
- Operation Hiram ended with Israeli forces claiming to have complete control of Galilee after a total rout of Fawzi al-Qawuqji's forces in the 250-square mile bulge there.
- The Hula massacre took place in the village of Hula, Lebanon when Israeli soldiers executed between 35 and 58 men.
- Died: Mary Nolan, 45, American actress, singer and dancer (drug overdose)
