= July 1948 =

Month of 1948

| << | July 1948 | | | | | >> |
| Su | Mo | Tu | We | Th | Fr | Sa |
| | | | | 1 | 2 | 3 |
| 4 | 5 | 6 | 7 | 8 | 9 | 10 |
| 11 | 12 | 13 | 14 | 15 | 16 | 17 |
| 18 | 19 | 20 | 21 | 22 | 23 | 24 |
| 25 | 26 | 27 | 28 | 29 | 30 | 31 |

The following events occurred in July 1948:

== July 1, 1948 (Thursday) ==
- Soviet representatives withdrew from the Allied Kommandatura in Berlin, ending the last vestige of co-operation between the four powers in Germany.
- US President Harry S. Truman signed a Republican-sponsored housing bill, but criticized it as "slipshod" for failing to provide any public housing or slum clearance.
- Idlewild International Airport (known today as John F. Kennedy International Airport) opened in Queens, New York.
- A law banning pinball machines and other "gaming devices" went into effect in New York City, one day after Mayor William O'Dwyer signed the measure to prohibit them after a brief public hearing. The machines had been associated with gambling and organized crime, despite some on the council maintaining that they were merely harmless amusements. The ban would remain in effect until 1976.
- Born: Ever Hugo Almeida, footballer, in Salto, Uruguay; John Ford, singer-songwriter, in Fulham, London, England; Michael McGimpsey, politician, in Donaghadee, Ireland
- Died: Charles Herrold, 62, American inventor and pioneer radio broadcaster

== July 2, 1948 (Friday) ==
- Two days of parliamentary elections concluded in Finland. The Agrarian League gained seven seats to become the largest party by two seats over the Social Democratic Party.
- Bob Falkenburg of the United States defeated John Bromwich of Australia in the Gentlemen's Singles Final at Wimbledon.
- Born: Saul Rubinek, actor and filmmaker, in Föhrenwald displaced persons camp, Germany

== July 3, 1948 (Saturday) ==
- President Truman signed the Agricultural Act of 1948 into law.
- Louise Brough defeated fellow American Doris Hart in the Ladies' Singles Final at Wimbledon.
- "The Woody Woodpecker Song" by Kay Kyser and His Orchestra topped the Billboard singles charts.
- Born: Tarmo Koivisto, cartoonist, in Orivesi, Finland

== July 4, 1948 (Sunday) ==
- The Northwood mid-air collision occurred when a Douglas DC-6 of Scandinavian Airlines System collided with an Avro York C.1 of the RAF over Northwood, London, resulting in 39 fatalities.
- 362 US and British planes airlifted nearly 3,000 tons of food into Berlin in a 22-hour span, the highest tonnage carried and number of planes used since the Berlin Airlift began.
- Born: René Arnoux, racing driver, in Pontcharra, France; Louis Raphaël I Sako, Head of the Chaldean Catholic Church, in Zakho, Iraq
- Died: Albert Bates, 54, American criminal (died in prison at Alcatraz); Edward Gent, 52, British Governor of the Malayan Union (killed in the Northwood air collision)

== July 5, 1948 (Monday) ==
- A bus falls into the Ranelva River 45 km (28 mi) north of Mo i Rana, Norway killing 16.
- The National Health Service was established in the United Kingdom, declared to be the most comprehensive health care system in the world at the time of its implementation.
- Born: Lojze Peterle, politician, in Čužnja Vas, Yugoslavia
- Died: Georges Bernanos, 60, French author; Carole Landis, 29, American actress (suicide by drug overdose)

== July 6, 1948 (Tuesday) ==
- The World Jewish Congress ended a ten-day convention in Montreux after urging all countries to support Israel and work against anti-Semitism.
- Born: Nathalie Baye, actress, in Mainneville, France; Brad Park, ice hockey player, in Toronto, Canada

== July 7, 1948 (Wednesday) ==
- General elections were held in the Netherlands. The Catholic People's Party remained the largest party in the House of Representatives.
- The first six women to enlist under the Women's Armed Services Integration Act were inducted into the US Navy.
- The Cleveland Indians baseball team signed the legendary Negro leagues pitcher Satchel Paige.
- Born: Jerry Sherk, American football player, in Grants Pass, Oregon; Stuart Varney, economic consultant and television host, in Derbyshire, England

== July 8, 1948 (Thursday) ==
- Israeli forces in the north of Palestine commenced Operation Dekel with the objective of capturing Nazareth and the Lower Galilee, while the Givati Brigade launched Operation An-Far with the goal of gaining control of approaches in southern Judea and blocking the advance of the Egyptian army.
- American, British and French authorities in Berlin drastically cut electric power to save coal.
- Born: Raffi, children's musician, as Raffi Cavoukian in Cairo, Egypt

== July 9, 1948 (Friday) ==
- Fighting resumed in the Arab-Israeli War when the four-week truce expired. UN mediator Folke Bernadotte said that Israel had been willing to extend the truce but that the Arabs had refused. Israeli forces launched Operation Danny with the goal of capturing territory east of Tel Aviv.
- A six-year ban on prostitution in Reno, Nevada was lifted after a judge reversed a lower court conviction of a woman for the offense, ruling that the wartime "emergency" period was over.
- Died: James Baskett, 44, American actor best known as Uncle Remus in the Disney film Song of the South.

== July 10, 1948 (Saturday) ==
- The Turkish Parliament passed a new election law guaranteeing a secret ballot and open vote counting in the presence of all political parties.
- Born: Theo Bücker, footballer and coach, in Bestwig, Germany; Chico Resch, ice hockey player and television commentator, in Moose Jaw, Saskatchewan, Canada

== July 11, 1948 (Sunday) ==
- Florida Senator Claude Pepper announced he was challenging President Truman for the Democratic nomination for president, claiming he had the support of twenty-two states in a "stop Truman" movement.
- Born: Martin Rushent, record producer, in Enfield, Middlesex, England (d. 2011)
- Died: King Baggot, 68, American silent movie actor, director and screenwriter; Franz Weidenreich, 75, German anatomist and physical anthropologist

== July 12, 1948 (Monday) ==
- The Democratic National Convention opened in Philadelphia.
- The second Battle of Negba was fought. The Egyptian army once again attacked the kibbutz of Negba but was again unable to capture the village.
- The novel The Heart of the Matter by Graham Greene was published in the United States.
- Born: Richard Simmons, fitness instructor and television personality, in New Orleans, Louisiana (d. 2024); Jay Thomas. actor and radio host, in Kermit, Texas (d. 2017)

== July 13, 1948 (Tuesday) ==
- The Democratic National Convention voted to seat the Mississippi delegates over objections from Northern states that they would lead a revolt against President Truman.
- The American League defeated the National League 5–2 in the 15th Major League Baseball All-Star Game at Sportsman's Park in St. Louis.
- Convair's MX-774 test vehicle, later designated the Atlas and used as a launch vehicle in the Mercury program, was test-fired for the first time.
- Born: Alf Hansen, rower, in Oslo, Norway; Don Sweet, Canadian football player, in Vancouver, British Columbia; Robert A. Underwood, politician and President of the University of Guam, in Tamuning, Guam

== July 14, 1948 (Wednesday) ==
- Riots broke out all over Italy after Italian Communist leader Palmiro Togliatti was shot three times outside the Chamber of Deputies by a university student. Communists called for a general strike to start the next day to pressure the Alcide De Gasperi government to resign.
- 35 Alabama and Mississippi delegates walked out of the Democratic National Convention in protest against Truman's new mandate and the party's civil rights platform.
- Born: Goodwill Zwelithini kaBhekuzulu, King of the Zulu nation, in Nongoma, South Africa (d. 2021)
- Died: Harry Brearley, 77, English metallurgist credited with the invention of stainless steel

== July 15, 1948 (Thursday) ==
- The Democratic National Convention ended at 2:30 in the morning after Harry Truman won two-thirds of the delegates. Kentucky Senator Alben W. Barkley was chosen as Truman's running mate. "I can't tell you how very much I appreciate the honor which you have just conferred upon me," Truman said in his acceptance speech. "I shall continue to try to deserve it."
- The Battle of Be'erot Yitzhak was fought when the Egyptian army attacked the Negev village of Be'erot Yitzhak. They managed to penetrate the village perimeter, but were driven out by Israeli reinforcements.
- Operation An-Far ended in limited Israeli success.
- Invoking Chapter VII of the United Nations Charter for the very first time in the history of the UN, the Security Council ordered Israel and the Arab League to stop fighting in Palestine or face sanctions.
- Born: Richard Franklin, film director, in Melbourne, Australia (d. 2007)
- Died: John J. Pershing, 87, United States Army officer and commander of the American Expeditionary Force on the Western Front in World War I

== July 16, 1948 (Friday) ==
- A commercial aircraft was hijacked for the first time when the Cathay Pacific Catalina seaplane Miss Macao was taken over by pirates seeking robbery and ransom. The plane crashed at Jiuzhou Yang (Pearl River Delta), China, killing 23 passengers and 3 crew and leaving the leader of the hijacking plot as the only survivor when he jumped out the emergency exit just before the crash.
- Nazareth surrendered to the Israelis in Operation Dekel after a light fight.
- Israeli forces launched Operation Death to the Invader in the northwestern Negev desert.
- Israel and the Arab League agreed to a ceasefire in Jerusalem.
- Italian Communists called off the general strike due to lack of popular support for it.
- The Vickers Viscount airliner had its first flight.
- Leo Durocher resigned as manager of the Brooklyn Dodgers and immediately accepted terms to manage the New York Giants.
- The film noir Key Largo starring Humphrey Bogart, Edward G. Robinson and Lauren Bacall premiered in New York.
- Born: Lars Lagerbäck, footballer and coach, in Katrineholm, Sweden; Pinchas Zukerman, violinist and conductor, in Tel Aviv, Israel

== July 17, 1948 (Saturday) ==
- Southern Democrats from thirteen states met in Birmingham, Alabama to create their own segregationist faction called the States' Rights Democratic Party. South Carolina Governor Strom Thurmond was elected as the party's presidential candidate, with Mississippi Governor Fielding L. Wright as his running mate.
- The Constitution of South Korea was promulgated.
- Israeli forces tried to capture East Jerusalem in Operation Kedem as part of the Battle for Jerusalem, but were repulsed.
- The Czech government announced the arrest of 68 civilians and 3 soldiers it accused of being Western spies who plotted to assassinate top government officials, including Defense Minister Ludvík Svoboda.

== July 18, 1948 (Sunday) ==
- Another truce went into effect in Palestine upon Arab-Israeli acceptance of the UN Security Council's order. The Battles of Latrun ended in Jordanian victory and Operation Death to the Invader ended in Israeli failure to achieve its objective.
- The Yanzhou Campaign ended in Communist victory.
- Pat Seerey of the Chicago White Sox became the fifth player in major league baseball history to hit four home runs in one game during a 12–11 victory over the Philadelphia Athletics.
- A group of professional wrestling promoters met in Waterloo, Iowa to form a new coalition known as the National Wrestling Alliance (NWA), with Orville Brown recognized as the organization's first heavyweight champion.
- Born: Hartmut Michel, biochemist and Nobel laureate, in Ludwigsburg, Germany
- Died: May Moss, 79, Australian women's rights activist

== July 19, 1948 (Monday) ==
- Operation Danny concluded with Israeli forces successfully capturing Ramle, Lydda and surrounding villages but failing to capture Latrun.
- The United States and Yugoslavia ended their dispute over frozen Yugoslavian assets when Belgrade agreed to pay $17 million to settle various American claims.
- An estimated 300,000 people lined the route from the Capitol building to Arlington National Cemetery to watch the funeral procession of John J. Pershing.

== July 20, 1948 (Tuesday) ==
- William Z. Foster, Benjamin J. Davis Jr., John Williamson and nine other American communists were indicted by a federal grand jury on charges of conspiring to overthrow the US government.
- Born: Muse Watson, actor, in Alexandria, Louisiana

== July 21, 1948 (Wednesday) ==
- 1948 Lake Mead Boeing B-29 crash: A modified Boeing B-29 Superfortress performing atmospheric research crashed into Lake Mead, Nevada. All 5 aboard survived.
- Marshal Tito made a speech at the 5th Congress of the Communist Party of Yugoslavia accusing the Cominform of attempting to provoke a civil war in Yugoslavia.
- Born: Beppe Grillo, comedian, actor and activist, in Genoa, Italy; Cat Stevens, singer-songwriter, as Steven Georgiou in London, England; Garry Trudeau, cartoonist (Doonesbury), in New York City; Mikhail Nikolayevich Zadornov, comedian and writer, in Jūrmala, Latvia (d. 2017)
- Died: Arshile Gorky, 44, Armenian-American painter (suicide by hanging)

== July 22, 1948 (Thursday) ==
- A second referendum was held in the Dominion of Newfoundland to decide its political future. A 52.3% majority voted to join Canada.
- Born: S. E. Hinton, author, in Tulsa, Oklahoma

== July 23, 1948 (Friday) ==
- Russian authorities in Germany announced plans to issue a new currency for their occupation zone.
- British authorities in Malaya outlawed the Malayan Communist Party and its affiliates.
- Died: D. W. Griffith, 73, American film director

== July 24, 1948 (Saturday) ==
- Israeli forces commenced Operation Shoter, a new offensive targeting an area south of Haifa.
- 1948 Progressive National Convention: Henry A. Wallace and Idaho Senator Glen H. Taylor were nominated as the presidential and vice-presidential candidates of the new Progressive Party at its national convention at Shibe Park in Philadelphia. During his acceptance speech Wallace advocated an American withdrawal from Berlin, saying that it had already been given up "politically" and "having done that we can't lose anything by giving it up militarily in a search for peace."
- Syngman Rhee became 1st President of South Korea.
- The Chiles-Whitted UFO encounter occurred in the skies near Montgomery, Alabama when two commercial pilots claimed to see a "glowing object" pass by their plane.
- The Democratic Party's primary election during the 1948 United States Senate election in Texas (won by Coke R. Stevenson) takes place.

== July 25, 1948 (Sunday) ==
- The Progressive National Convention ended with the adoption of a party platform pledging an end to segregation, repeal of the Bell Trade Act, outlawing the atomic bomb, strengthening of the United Nations and an end to the Truman Doctrine and the Marshall Plan.
- Otto Skorzeny escaped from a German prison camp.
- Gino Bartali of Italy won the Tour de France.
- Born: Steve Goodman, folk musician, in Chicago, Illinois (d. 1984)

== July 26, 1948 (Monday) ==
- President Truman issued Executive Order 9981, abolishing racial discrimination in the United States military.
- Operation Shoter ended in Israeli victory.
- US and British authorities in Germany ordered all rail traffic from the western zone to the Soviet zone halted, claiming "technical difficulties".
- André Marie became Prime Minister of France.
- The biographical film The Babe Ruth Story, starring William Bendix and Claire Trevor and considered among the worst movies ever made, premiered at the Astor Theatre in New York City. Babe Ruth himself left the hospital to attend the premiere where he received a standing ovation, but he fell ill again and had to leave before the movie was over.

== July 27, 1948 (Tuesday) ==
- President Truman addressed a special session of Congress urging immediate enactment of anti-inflation and public housing legislation, as well as adoption of his civil rights program. "We cannot afford to wait for the next Congress to act," Truman declared, adding that the eight months before the 81st Congress could get to work "would be much too long."
- Israeli forces launched Operation GYS with the objective of creating an Israeli enclave in the northern Negev desert, but had to retreat after heavy resistance.
- Born: Peggy Fleming, figure skater, in San Jose, California; Greg Gagne, professional wrestler, in Robbinsdale, Minnesota
- Died: Joe Tinker, 68, American baseball player

== July 28, 1948 (Wednesday) ==
- An explosion at the IG Farben chemical works in Ludwigshafen killed more than 200 people and injured 3,800 more.
- Born: Gerald Casale, bassist and founding member of the rock band Devo, as Gerald Pizzute in Ravenna, Ohio
- Died: Susan Glaspell, 72, American playwright and novelist

== July 29, 1948 (Thursday) ==
- The 1948 Summer Olympics opened in London, England. A record 59 nations were represented, although Germany and Japan were not allowed to participate and the Soviet Union chose not to send any athletes.

== July 30, 1948 (Friday) ==
- The IG Farben Trial ended at Nuremberg. Ten of the twenty-three defendants were acquitted while the other thirteen were found guilty of at least one charge.
- Israeli forces commenced Operation GYS 2, a second attempt to break through to the Negev.
- Elizabeth Bentley, a confessed American spy for the Russians, testified before a Senate subcommittee that she had received classified information during the war from 30 to 50 informants in key government posts. Among those she named were William Remington, an important member of the Department of Commerce.
- The Representation of the People Act 1948, most notable for abolishing plural voting, received Royal Assent in the United Kingdom.
- Born:
  - Billy Paultz, basketball player, in River Edge, New Jersey
  - Jean Reno, Spanish-French actor, in Casablanca, Morocco
  - Julia Tsenova, composer and pianist, in Sofia, Bulgaria (d. 2010); Darina Allen, chef, in Cullohill, Ireland

== July 31, 1948 (Saturday) ==
- The Krupp Trial ended in Nuremberg. One defendant was acquitted and the other eleven received prison sentences of varying lengths up to twelve years.
- Elizabeth Bentley continued her testimony and accused wartime presidential aide Lauchlin Currie and former Assistant Treasury Secretary Harry Dexter White of indirectly providing her with classified information.
- Died: Lucy Mercer Rutherfurd, 57, mistress of Franklin D. Roosevelt
