= Jisr Isdud =

13th century Mamluk bridge built over the Lakhish River

Coordinates: 31°46′00″N 34°39′58″E

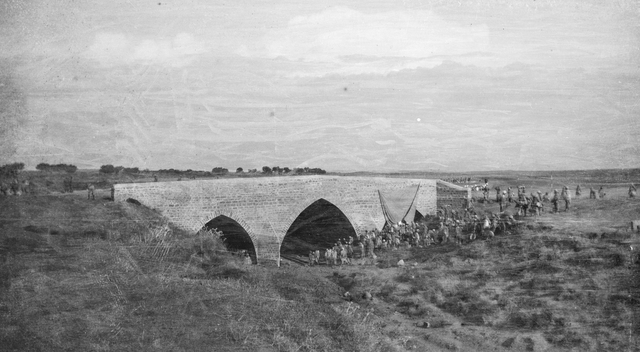
Jisr Isdud in 1917

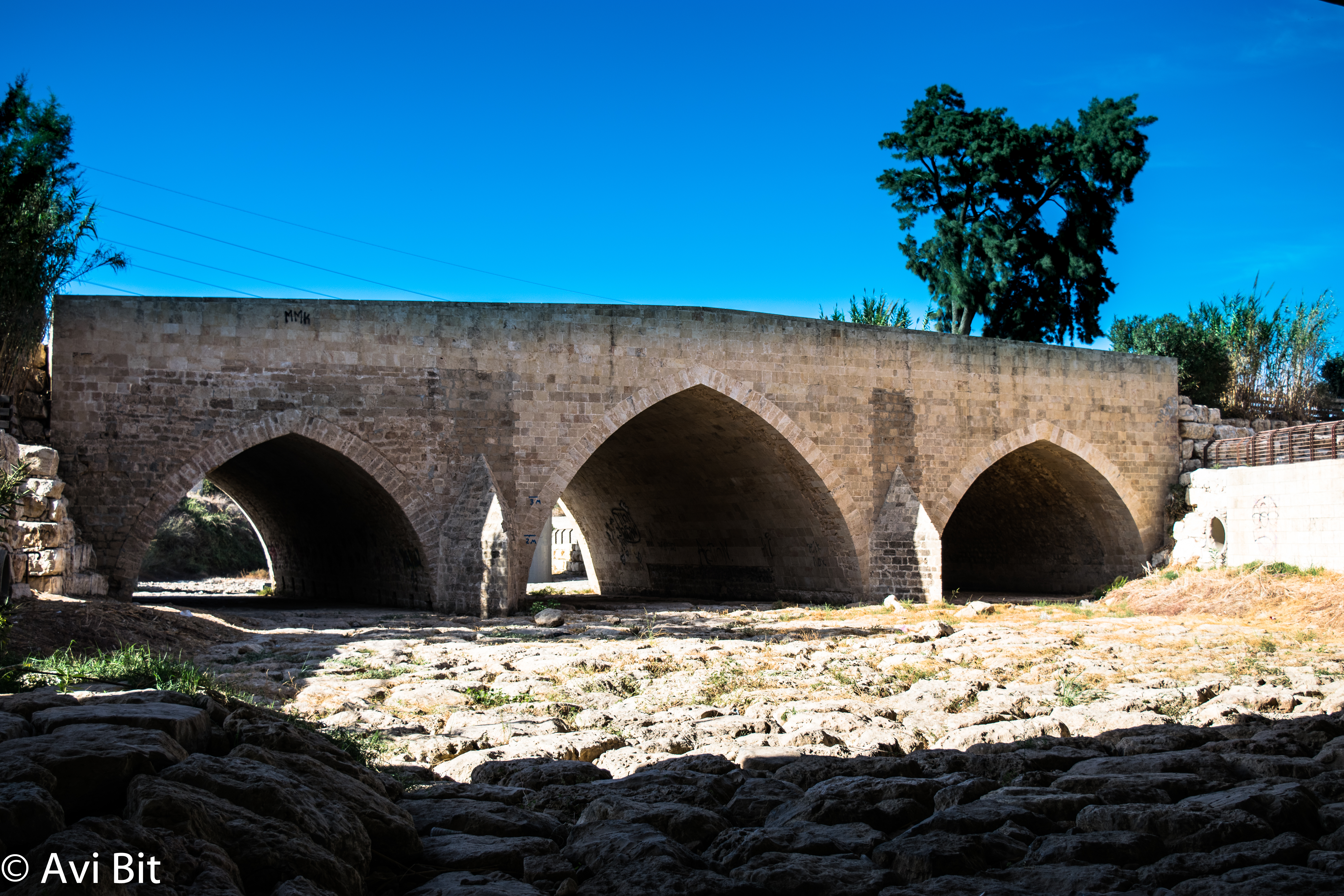
The reconstructed bridge in 2016

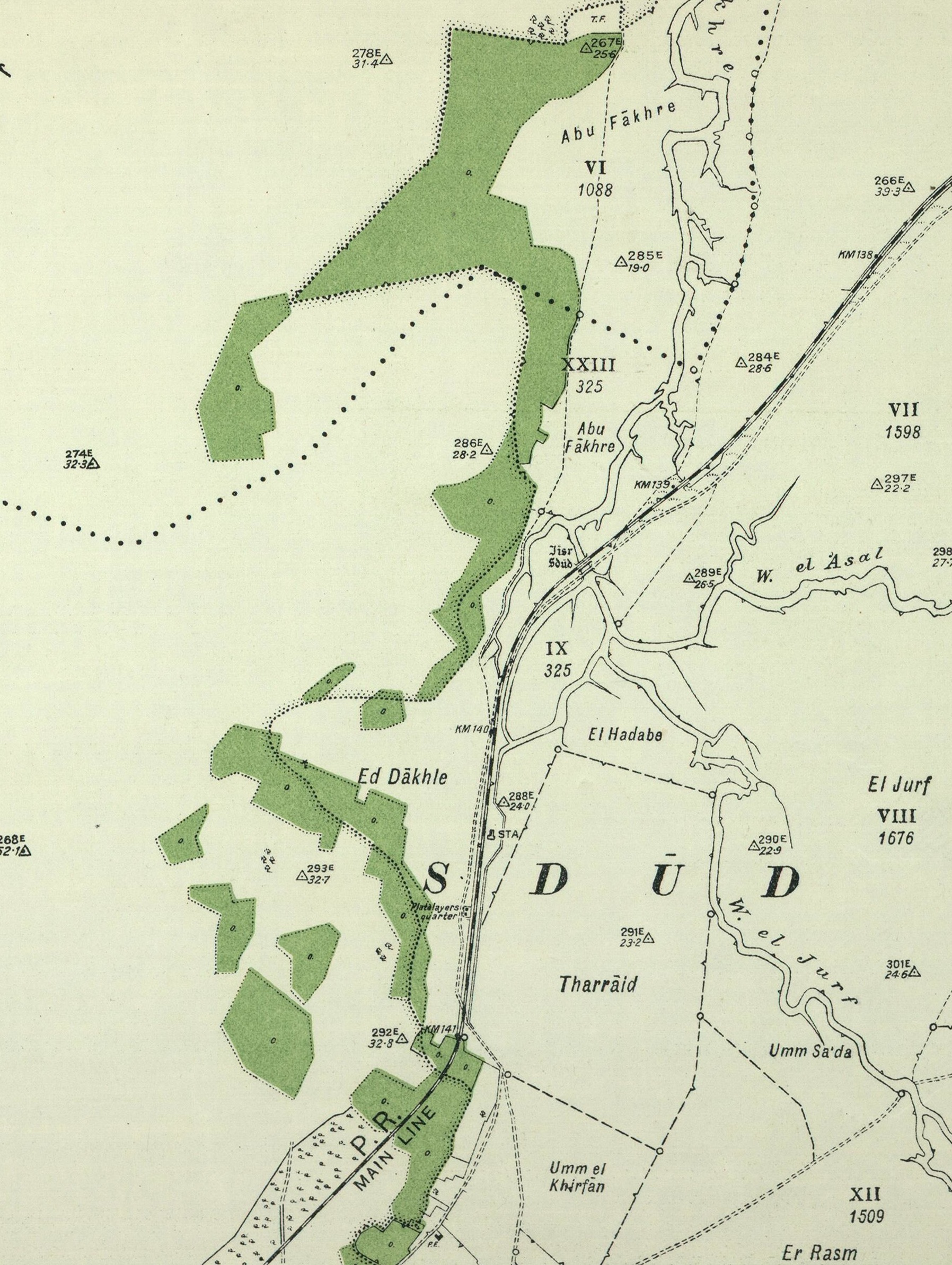
Jisr Isdud in 1930, and its parallel railway bridge, in a Survey of Palestine map

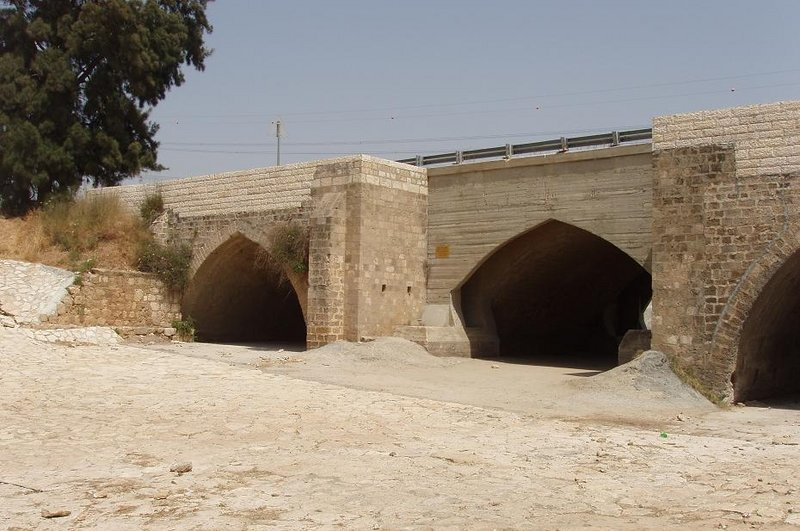
Ad Halom Bridge (Jisr Isdud), restored section of Mamluk bridge, 2005, prior to its archaeological restoration

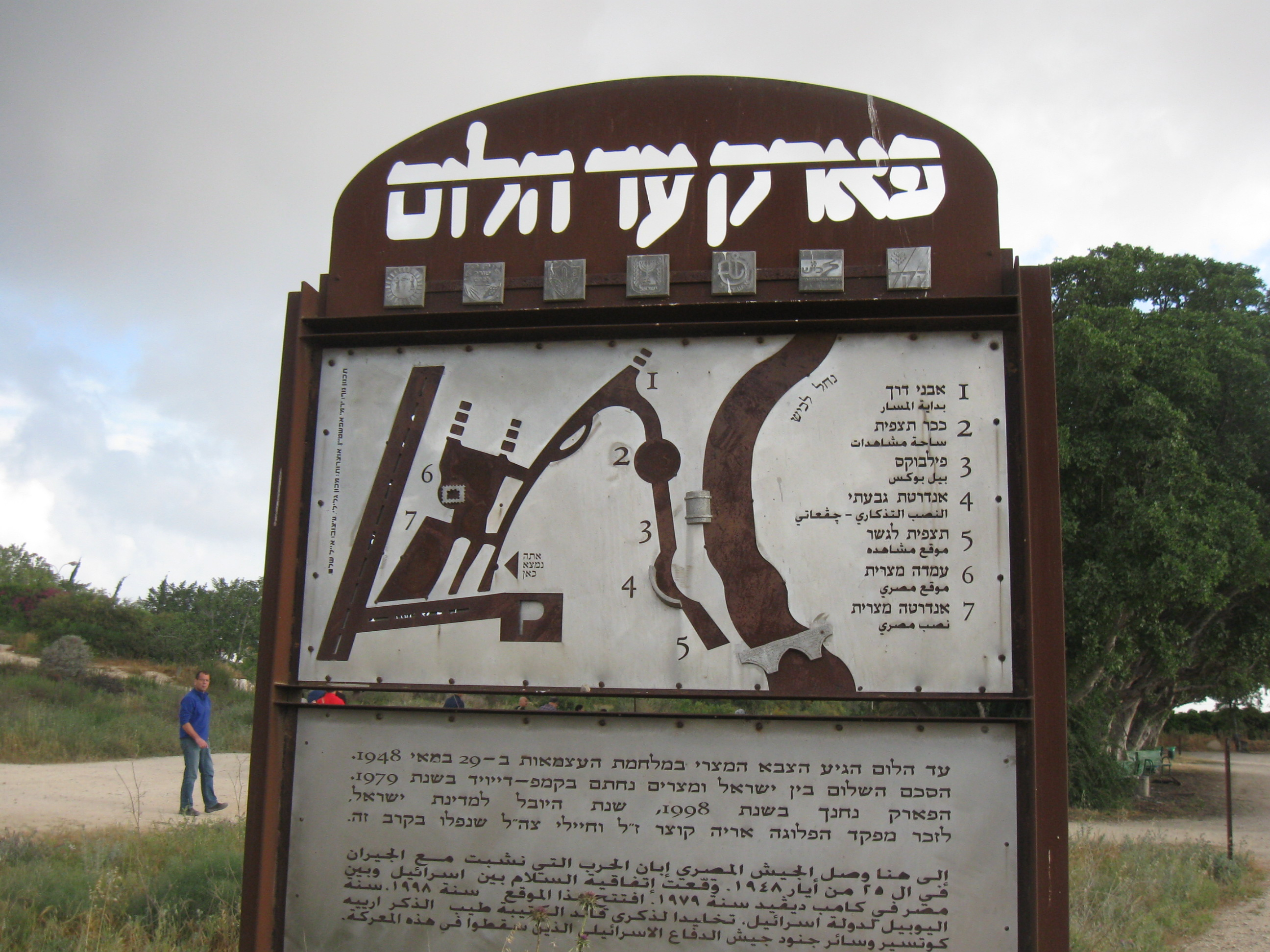
Sign in the area with the bridge shown bottom right

Jisr Isdud or Isdud Bridge, also known as the Ad Halom Bridge, was a 13th century Mamluk bridge built over the Lakhish River (Wadi Sukrir/Wadi Fakhira). It is located approximately 1.5 km north of the Ad Halom junction. The bridge is similar in style and history to the nearby Jisr Jindas and Yibna Bridge.

The bridge is used today by pedestrians and cyclists.

== Description ==
It is made of dressed kurkar stones, with three lancet arches. According to the Archaeological Survey of Israel, the south arch "reveals earlier masonry work, perhaps from the Mamluk period, if not earlier. Flooding in the wadi exposed remains of ancient buildings, built of dressed kurkar stones, near the NW section of the bridge."

== History ==
The bridge was a tactical location in the 1917 Battle of Mughar Ridge. It was blown up in 1946 by the Haganah in the Night of the Bridges, and again in 1948 by the Golani Brigade in early stages of the 1948 Arab–Israeli War.

It was subsequently reconstructed and upgraded, and carried heavy traffic for many years. In 2010 it was upgraded with archaeological support led by preservation architect Saadia Mendel. The concrete middle arch was dismantled and rebuilt using Mamluk-era techniques.
