= Operation GYS =

Israeli military operation

Coordinates: 31°35′29.05″N 34°45′29.4″E

- Part of 1948 Arab–Israeli War
Date	July 27, July 30 – August 2 1948
Location	Northwestern Negev
Result	Egyptian victory: Israeli failure to accomplish objectives

Belligerents
Israel (IDF)	Egypt

Commanders and leaders
Shimon Avidan (Givati)	Ahmed Ali al-Mwawi (Egyptian forces in Palestine)

Strength
3 battalions	

Operation GYS, or Operation Gayis (Hebrew: מִבְצָע גַּיִ"ס), short for Golani, Yiftach, Sergei (Negev)—the three participating brigades—was an Israeli military and logistical operation conducted during the second truce of the 1948 Arab–Israeli War. Its objective was to create a corridor to the Israeli enclave in the northern Negev desert, surrounded by the Egyptian army. When the military operation (later called GYS 1) commenced and failed on July 27, 1948, a more modest operation (GYS 2) was attempted on July 31, aimed just to transport goods to the enclave.

In GYS 1, the Israelis hoped to capture Fallujah and Iraq al-Manshiyya, thus cutting a wedge through the Egyptian forces and having free passage to the Negev. However, the attack on Iraq al-Manshiyya failed and the forces in Fallujah retreated due to communication problems. In GYS 2, the forces took a safer road to the east of Iraq al-Manshiyya and successfully escorted a convoy of 20 trucks. A third attempt on August 18–19, called Operation Way to the Negev, failed. As a result, most supplies had to be transported by air for almost two months, in an operation known as Operation Avak.

== Background ==
As a response to the Morrison–Grady Plan of 1946, the Jewish Yishuv decided to erect 11 new villages in the northern Negev desert in order to insure that the territory would become part of a Jewish state in any future political decision. On May 15, 1948, following Israel's declaration of independence, the armies of several Arab states invaded the new state. The Egyptian army advanced along the coastal road, stopping at the Sukreir Bridge and remaining there following Operation Pleshet, an Israeli offensive on the column near the bridge.

The Egyptians then set up positions in the Majdal – Bayt Jibrin road in order to strengthen their hold on the area and disconnect the Negev villages from the rest of Israel. The Israelis made two major attempts to break through the blockade—Operation An-Far and Operation Death to the Invader—but failed to create its own wedge between the Egyptian forces. On July 18, 1948, the second truce to the war came into effect, ending the hostilities with the Negev still separate. The villages of Hatta and Karatiyya had been captured however, forcing the Egyptians to bypass them with a makeshift road to the south.

Before the Egyptians created the bypass, United Nations observers visited the area and determined that the Israelis controlled a passageway to the Negev at the beginning of the truce. Israel believed that this gave them the right to attack Egyptian forces blocking the way, despite the ceasefire. Still, the IDF's plan was to withhold an attack until the Egyptians opened fire on the convoy. Elements of the Yiftach Brigade which had participated in Operation Danny in July were moved south for the operation.

== GYS 1 ==
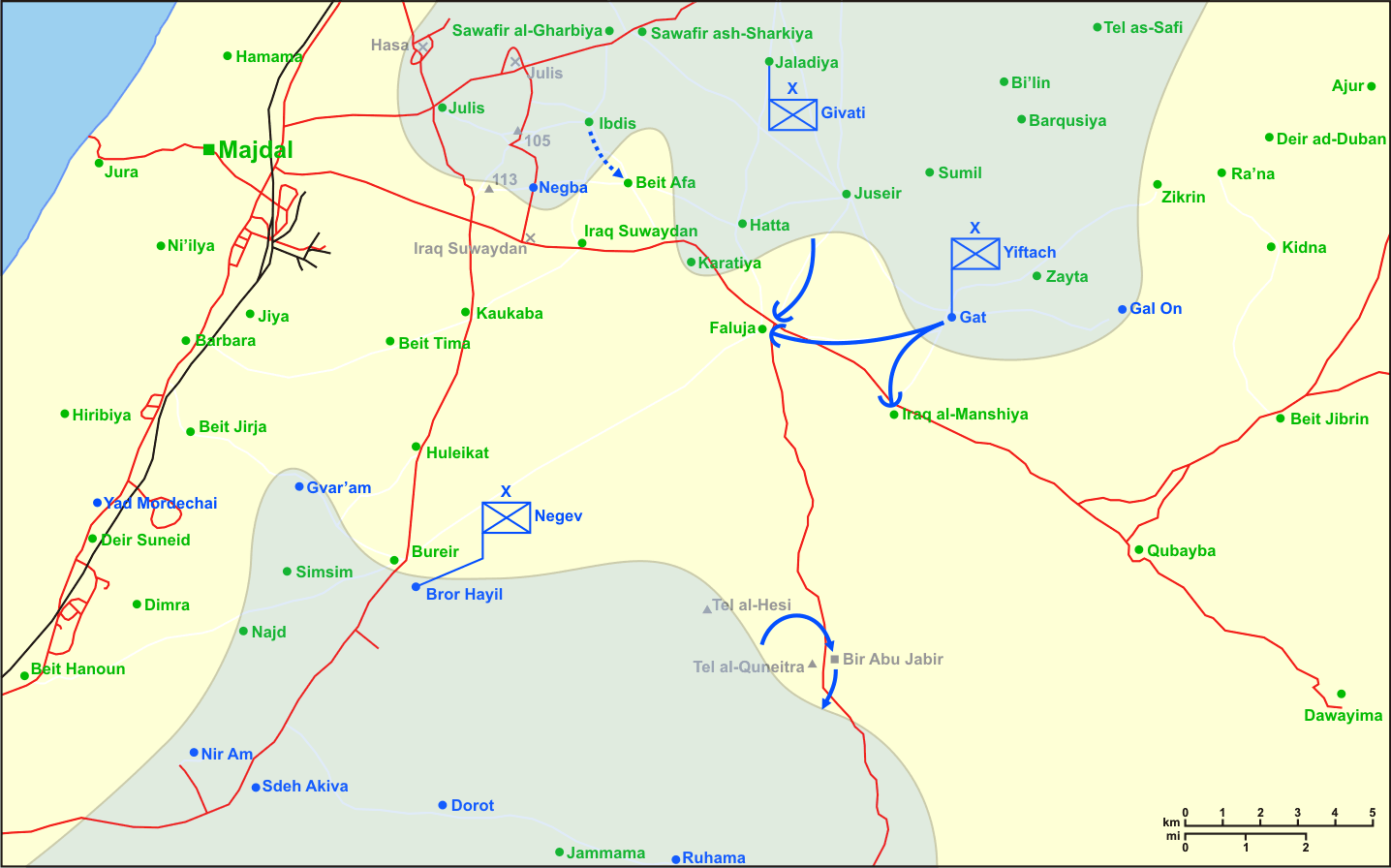
Map of the movements in GYS 1

Operation GYS was a plan to create a corridor between the Negev and the rest of Israel from Gat and Karatiyya in the north to Bir Abu-Jabir in the south. The Givati Brigade's forces would deploy from Jaladiyya, the Yiftach Brigade's—from Gat, and the Negev Brigade's—from Bror Hayil. Givati's 53rd Battalion would capture Iraq al-Manshiyya, and Yiftach's forces, under the umbrella command of its 1st Battalion, would take Fallujah. They would meet to the south of the villages with Negev's 7th Battalion. The time frame for the operation was set for only one day. The command was given to Shimon Avidan, CO of the Givati Brigade.

The attack started on July 27, when Givati sent a force to attack Bayt 'Affa (between Negba and Karatiyya) as a diversion. Other Givati forces then left Gat and assaulted Iraq al-Manshiyya but met with heavy resistance. Meanwhile, an Yiftach company surrounded Fallujah in another company attacked; a third was in reserve. The first thrust was repelled, and on the second, the company reached the village's inner perimeter. However, the commander of Yiftach's forces was unable to communicate with the attacking company and a retreat order was given. The two companies around the village complied immediately, but the situation was more difficult for the spearhead force, which stayed until dawn and suffered four dead and 26 wounded. After the operation failed, Negev forces, which took up positions at Bir Abu-Jabir, also went back to their bases.

== GYS 2 ==
Between GYS 1 and GYS 2, the Israeli forces that participated in GYS 1 harassed Egyptian transportation along the Majdal – Bayt Jibrin road. The second attempt to break through to the Negev was made on July 30 – August 2. In the evening of the 30th, Givati commandos left Zeita for a reconnaissance patrol. They returned after reaching Khirbet Qarqara, satisfied that there were no Egyptian forces there. On July 31, the military police escorted the supply convoy to the south of the country. They met with the Samson's Foxes unit of Givati at 23:50 on July 31. Meanwhile, the Yiftach brigade took up positions along the planned route of the convoy and staged a diversionary attack in the area of Julis.

The convoy met with difficulties when it approached Wadi Qubeiba. Two trucks got stuck and one ran into a land mine, killing one soldier. After reaching Khirbet Qarqara, local Bedouins opened fire upon the convoy and retreated after exchanging shots with Givati. At the tomb of Sheikh Abu Ghazala, south of Fallujah, the convoy met with the Negev's 9th Battalion and the escorting forces returned to their bases. The convoy then safely reached Bror Hayil and Ruhama. Yiftach's forces were then removed from the southern front for the time.

== Aftermath ==
A third attempt, named Operation Way to the Negev, was made on August 18–19, but the convoy was directly attacked by Egyptian forces and only one truck made it through to the Negev. On the same day, the IDF General Staff decided that the ground forces were unable to safely pass supplies to the Negev, and that the air force would henceforth be used. This was one of the reasons for launching Operation Avak, a continuous aerial supply that took place between August 23 and October 21, 1948, until a permanent ground corridor was opened in Operation Yoav.
