= September 1948 =

Month of 1948

<<	September 1948					>>
Su	Mo	Tu	We	Th	Fr	Sa
			1	2	3	4
5	6	7	8	9	10	11
12	13	14	15	16	17	18
19	20	21	22	23	24	25
26	27	28	29	30

September 9: The Democratic People's Republic of Korea is established

The following events occurred in September 1948:

== September 1, 1948 (Wednesday) ==
- A parliamentary assembly tasked with writing a provisional constitution for western Germany formally convened at Bonn. Christian Democratic leader Konrad Adenauer was elected Assembly President.
- 44 people, most of them circus performers, as well as an assortment of circus animals drowned off the coast of Colombia in the sinking of the Honduran ship Euzkera. 12 survived.
- A German appeals court acquitted Hjalmar Schacht of charges that he had been a major Nazi offender and ordered him released from prison.
- Born: James Rebhorn, actor, in Philadelphia, Pennsylvania (d. 2014)
- Died: Muhammad VII al-Munsif, 67, ruler of Tunisia 1942–43

== September 2, 1948 (Thursday) ==
- 1948 Australian National Airways DC-3 crash: The Douglas DC-3 Lutana crashed en route from Brisbane to Sydney, killing all 13 on board.
- The Longshore strike began on the west coast of the United States.
- Andrei Zhdanov was buried in the Kremlin Wall Necropolis after a state funeral in which Joseph Stalin served as a pallbearer.
- Born: Nate Archibald, basketball player, in New York City; Terry Bradshaw, American football quarterback and TV sports analyst, in Shreveport, Louisiana; Christa McAuliffe, teacher and astronaut, in Boston, Massachusetts (d. 1986)
- Died: Tancred Borenius, 63, Finnish art historian and diplomat; Sylvanus Morley, 65, American archaeologist, scholar and World War I spy

== September 3, 1948 (Friday) ==
- The World Council of Churches called on its 150 member bodies to denounce anti-Semitism as "absolutely irreconcilable with the profession and practice of the Christian faith" and a "sin against God and man."
- Born: Don Brewer, drummer of the rock band Grand Funk Railroad, in Flint, Michigan; Levy Mwanawasa, 3rd President of Zambia, in Mufulira, Zambia (d. 2008)
- Died: Edvard Beneš, 64, Czech politician and two-time President of Czechoslovakia; Evan Durbin, 42, British economist and politician (drowned)

== September 4, 1948 (Saturday) ==
- Queen Wilhelmina of the Netherlands abdicated the Dutch throne in favor of her daughter Juliana.
- Born: Michael Berryman, actor, in Los Angeles, California

== September 5, 1948 (Sunday) ==
- Robert Schuman became Prime Minister of France for the second time.
- Shannon's Way by A. J. Cronin topped The New York Times Fiction Best Seller list.
- Born: Benita Ferrero-Waldner, diplomat and politician, in Salzburg, Austria
- Died: Richard C. Tolman, 67, American mathematical physicist and physical chemist

== September 6, 1948 (Monday) ==
- Juliana was sworn in as Queen of the Netherlands in a forty-five minute ceremony attended by many royal guests including Prince Gustav Adolf and Princess Louise of Sweden, Prince Olaf and Princess Märtha of Norway, Prince Axel and Princess Margaretha of Denmark and Princess Margaret of Britain.
- The New York Board of Rabbis cabled Motion Picture Association of America President Eric Johnston asking him to "do everything possible" to keep the British film Oliver Twist out of the United States as a "vehicle of blatant anti-Semitism." The film would not be screened in the US until 1951.
- The musical drama film The Red Shoes starring the ballet dancer Moira Shearer premiered in the United Kingdom.
- Born: Samuel Hui, singer, in Xiguan, China

== September 7, 1948 (Tuesday) ==
- The government of French Prime Minister Robert Schuman was toppled after just two days in power when it lost a narrow confidence vote in the National Assembly, 295 to 289.
- Born: Susan Blakely, actress and model, in Frankfurt, Germany

== September 8, 1948 (Wednesday) ==
- White supremacist Herman Talmadge won the Georgia Democratic gubernatorial primary, defeating the incumbent Governor Melvin E. Thompson.
- The flag of North Korea was adopted.
- Born: The Great Kabuki, professional wrestler, as Akihisa Mera in Nobeoka, Japan

== September 9, 1948 (Thursday) ==
- The Democratic People's Republic of Korea (North Korea) was founded with Kim Il Sung as the country's first Premier.
- Rex Barney of the Brooklyn Dodgers pitched a 2-0 no-hitter against the New York Giants on a rainy night at the Polo Grounds. It would be the last no-hitter ever recorded at that storied ballpark.

== September 10, 1948 (Friday) ==
- US President Harry S. Truman's name was knocked off the Louisiana ballot, leaving him to be only a write-in candidate there in the November election. The Louisiana Democratic State Central Committee declared that the States' Rights Democratic Party candidates Strom Thurmond and Fielding L. Wright were the Democratic party nominees in the state.
- Henry A. Wallace spoke in front of 48,000 supporters in Yankee Stadium, declaring that "Mr. Truman has demonstrated that he could not fill the shoes of Roosevelt," and that Wall Street corporations were keeping the South divided to multiply their profits.
- Lester B. Pearson became Canadian Secretary of State for External Affairs.
- Born: Stanisław Flejterski, Polish economist and professor; Judy Geeson, actress, in Arundel, England; Bob Lanier, basketball player, in Buffalo, New York (d. 2022); Margaret Trudeau, author, actress, social advocate and wife of Canadian Prime Minister Pierre Trudeau, in Vancouver, British Columbia; Charlie Waters, American football player and coach, in Miami, Florida
- Died: Ferdinand I of Bulgaria, 87, ruler of Bulgaria 1887–1918

== September 11, 1948 (Saturday) ==
- Henri Queuille became Prime Minister of France.
- Miss Minnesota BeBe Shopp was crowned Miss America 1948.
- Born: John Martyn, folk singer and songwriter, in New Malden, England (d. 2009)
- Died: Muhammad Ali Jinnah, 71, lawyer, politician and 1st Governor-General of Pakistan

== September 12, 1948 (Sunday) ==
- The Liaoshen Campaign began in the Chinese Civil War.
- Died: Rupert D'Oyly Carte, 71, English hotelier, theatre owner and impresario

== September 13, 1948 (Monday) ==
- The Indian integration of Hyderabad began when the Indian Armed Forces invaded the State of Hyderabad.
- The Boeing strike of 1948 ended after almost five months when the Union members reluctantly went back to work.
- Born: Nell Carter, singer and actress, in Birmingham, Alabama (d. 2003); Sitiveni Rabuka, 3rd Prime Minister of Fiji, in Cakaudrove, Fiji
- Died: Paul Wegener, 73, German actor, writer and film director

== September 14, 1948 (Tuesday) ==
- Forty American soldiers were killed in a train collision 20 miles north of Daejon, South Korea.

== September 15, 1948 (Wednesday) ==
- US Air Force Major Richard L. Johnson established a new flight airspeed record flying an F-86 670.981 miles per hour.
- A general election was held in Southern Rhodesia. Prime Minister Godfrey Huggins regained the overall majority he had lost in the 1946 election.
- Born: Jerry Korab, ice hockey player, in Sault Ste. Marie, Ontario, Canada

== September 16, 1948 (Thursday) ==
- The Battle of Jinan began in the Chinese Civil War.
- CIO International Fur Workers Union President Ben Gold confirmed he was a member of the Communist Party during testimony before a House Labor subcommittee.
- Born:
  - Ron Blair, bassist for Tom Petty and the Heartbreakers, in San Diego, California
  - Julia Donaldson, British children’s book author, in Hampstead, London

== September 17, 1948 (Friday) ==
- Diplomat Folke Bernadotte was assassinated in Jerusalem when members of the Jewish Zionist group Lehi opened fire on a UN convoy. Bernadotte and French UN observer André Serot were transported to Hadassah Hospital on Mount Scopus but were found to have died instantly.
- Penalty flags were used in an NFL game for the first time, in a game between the Green Bay Packers and Boston Yanks.
- Born: John Ritter, actor and comedian, in Burbank, California (d. 2003)
- Died:
  - Ruth Benedict, 61, American anthropologist and folklorist
  - Folke Bernadotte, 53, Swedish diplomat and nobleman (assassinated by members of Lehi)
  - Emil Ludwig, 67, German-Swiss author; André Serot, 52, French military officer (killed in the Bernadotte assassination)

== September 18, 1948 (Saturday) ==
- 200 arrests were made in Jerusalem and Tel Aviv in connection with the assassination of Count Bernadotte.
- The Indian integration of Hyderabad was completed.
- The armed conflict known as the Madiun Affair between the Indonesian government and the left-wing People's Democratic Front began in Madiun, East Java.
- The Western film Rachel and the Stranger starring Loretta Young, William Holden and Robert Mitchum premiered in New York City.

== September 19, 1948 (Sunday) ==
- General elections were held in Sweden. The Swedish Social Democratic Party led by Prime Minister Tage Erlander lost 3 seats but remained the largest party.
- The Soviet Union published a statement announcing that it would withdraw all Soviet troops from North Korea by the end of the year and expressing its hope that the United States would do likewise to the American troops in South Korea.
- Born: Jeremy Irons, actor, in Cowes, Isle of Wight, England; Nadiya Tkachenko, pentathlete, in Kremenchuk, Ukrainian SSR, Soviet Union

== September 20, 1948 (Monday) ==
- The Israeli government enacted emergency anti-terrorist legislation, allowing for imprisonment of 5 to 25 years for taking an active part in terrorist acts and 1 to 5 years for membership in a terrorist organization.
- Count Bernadotte's final report to the United Nations was published posthumously. It called for recognition of Israel but advocated transfer of the Negev area to Arabs, incorporation of all of Galilee into Israel and placing Jerusalem under UN control.
- Born: Rey Langit, journalist, in Pampanga, Philippines; George R. R. Martin, novelist, in Bayonne, New Jersey; Adrian Piper, conceptual artist, in New York City
- Died: Husain Salaahuddin, 67, Maldivian writer and scholar

== September 21, 1948 (Tuesday) ==
- In Paris, H. V. Evatt was elected President of the United Nations General Assembly in the first UN session ever held in Europe.
- The Irgun dissolved and handed over its arms to the Israeli government in response to an ultimatum to either disband or be labeled a terrorist organization.
- Marcel Cerdan knocked out Tony Zale in the 12th round at Roosevelt Stadium in Jersey City, New Jersey to win the world middleweight boxing title.
- Born: Aurelio López, baseball player, in Tecamachalco, Puebla, Mexico (d. 1992)

== September 22, 1948 (Wednesday) ==
- As a last-ditch effort to settle the Berlin dispute in a framework of four-party talks, identical notes from Britain, the United States and France were dispatched to the Soviet Union demanding a clear-cut statement on Soviet intentions.
- Born: Denis Burke, politician, in Queensland, Australia; Jim Byrnes, blues musician and actor, in St. Louis, Missouri; Mark Phillips, horseman and first husband of Anne, Princess Royal, in Tetbury, England
- Died: Prince Adalbert of Prussia, 64, third son of Kaiser Wilhelm II of Germany

== September 23, 1948 (Thursday) ==
- 12,000 people attended a rally of the American Communist Party at Madison Square Garden.
- Died: Shafiq Ades, 47 or 48, Iraqi-Jewish businessman (hanged after a show trial)

== September 24, 1948 (Friday) ==
- In Washington, "Axis Sally" Mildred Gillars pleaded not guilty to charges of broadcasting wartime Nazi propaganda.
- The Battle of Jinan ended in Communist victory.
- The Israeli Air Force launched Operation Velvetta, a secret mission to transport Supermarine Spitfires purchased in Czechoslovakia to Israel.
- The Louisiana House of Representatives voted for a legislative compromise that would allow President Truman's name to be listed on the state's general ballot in the November election, but not as a Democratic candidate.
- African-American actor Rex Ingram was arrested on charges of violating the Mann Act with a 15-year old white girl from Kansas.
- Born: Phil Hartman, actor and comedian, in Brantford, Ontario, Canada (d. 1998)
- Died: Warren William, 53, American actor

== September 25, 1948 (Saturday) ==
- At a United Nations address in Paris, Soviet Deputy Foreign Minister Andrey Vyshinsky called upon the five great powers to reduce their armed forces by one-third as a first step toward disarmament.
- Born: Vladimir Yevtushenkov, business oligarch, in Smolensk, USSR

== September 26, 1948 (Sunday) ==
- Through an authorized broadcast on TASS, the Soviet Union replied to the three-power note on Berlin by naming its price for settlement of the dispute: control of all land and air traffic between Berlin and western Germany. The foreign ministers of the United States, Britain and France replied that further negotiations were impossible and that they intended to refer the matter to the UN Security Council.
- The Boston Braves clinched their first National League pennant since 1914 when they edged the New York Giants 3-2.
- Born: Olivia Newton-John, British-Australian singer, actress and activist, in Cambridge, England (d. 2022)

== September 27, 1948 (Monday) ==
- 800 people were killed by a typhoon in and around the Leizhou Peninsula in southern China.
- Pope Pius XII issued Bis saeculari, an apostolic constitution on the Sodality of Our Lady, to mark the 200th anniversary of the Papal Bull Gloriosae Dominae by Pope Benedict XIV in 1748.
- The novel Intruder in the Dust by William Faulkner was published.
- Born: Michele Dotrice, actress, in Cleethorpes, England; A Martinez, actor and singer, as Adolfo Martinez III in Glendale, California

== September 28, 1948 (Tuesday) ==
- Defense Ministers of Britain, France, Belgium, the Netherlands and Luxembourg announced from Paris an agreement to establish a permanent common defense organization for Western Europe.
- Died: Gregg Toland, 44, American cinematographer (coronary thrombosis)

== September 29, 1948 (Wednesday) ==
- The United States, Britain and France delivered identical notes to UN Secretary General Trygve Lie accusing the USSR of violating Article 2 of the United Nations Charter in which all members pledge to settle their international disputes "by peaceful means in such a manner that international peace and security, and justice, are not endangered."
- The United States Atomic Energy Commission barred the labor unions United Public Workers of America and United Electrical, Radio and Machine Workers of America from nuclear energy plants because of suspected Communist affiliation.
- KXAS-TV in Dallas–Fort Worth signed on as the first television station in the state of Texas.
- Born: Mark Farner, lead singer and guitarist of Grand Funk Railroad, in Flint, Michigan; Bryant Gumbel, television journalist and sportscaster, in New Orleans, Louisiana; Theo Jörgensmann, jazz clarinetist, in Bottrop, Germany (d. 2025)

== September 30, 1948 (Thursday) ==
- Berlin Communists moved into the official chambers of the elected City Assembly in the Soviet zone and conducted business there over the protests of the regular City Assembly.
- Died: Edith Roosevelt, 87, First Lady of the United States 1901–09
