= Ad Halom =

Limit of the 1948 Arab advance into Israel

Coordinates: 31°46′00″N 34°39′58″E

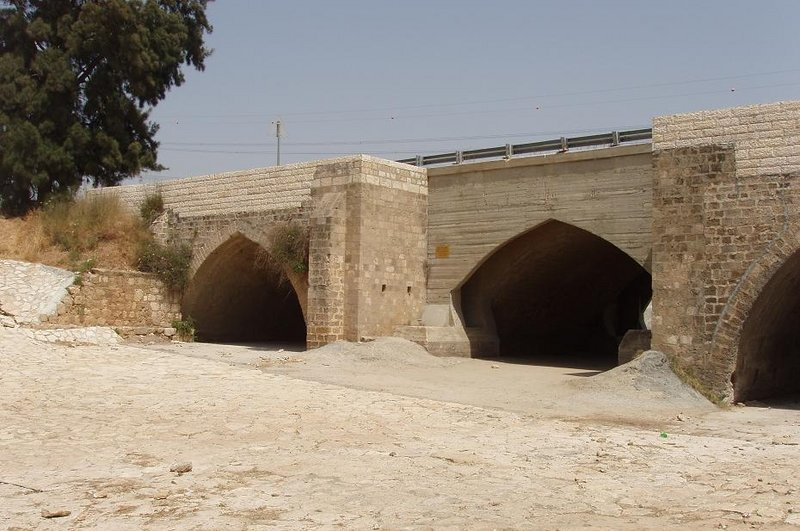
Jisr Isdud, restored section of Mamluk bridge, 2005

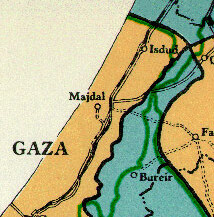
Ad Halom, the northernmost point reached by the Egyptian army, was within the area allocated to the Arab state in the United Nations Partition Plan for Palestine

Ad Halom (Hebrew: עַד הֲלוֹם) is a site at the eastern entrance to the city of Ashdod, Israel, where three bridges cross the Lakhish River.

== Battle ==
Ad Halom (lit. "no further" or "up to here") refers to the northernmost point reached by the Egyptian army in Operation Pleshet, one of the battles of the 1948 Arab–Israeli War. Since then, the term is used in Hebrew to emphasize the last line of defense that must not be defeated. The term was also used in the name of the company "Adallom".

On May 29, 1948, Israel dispatched four Avia S-199 aircraft. It was the first combat operation of the Israeli/Machal Air Force. The mission was flown by Lou Lenart, U.S.A., Ezer Weizman, Modi Alon, Israel, and Eddie Cohen, South Africa, to attack the Egyptians between the Arab village of Isdud and the bridge over the Lachish River. Cohen was shot down by anti-aircraft fire, becoming the first casualty of the fledgling IAF. The Givati Brigade blew up the bridge and defended the river bank from a pillbox during Operation Barak. The Egyptian Army later took up positions at the site, which saw two battles in mid-1948.

The Egyptian forces were later defeated in Operation Yoav; the pillbox and defensive wall remain as memorials of the events.

== Egyptian monument ==
At the Camp David Accords, Israel and Egypt convened for a monument dedicated to the fallen Egyptian soldiers to be erected at the site, in exchange for the Israeli memorials to fallen Israeli soldiers from the Sinai Peninsula being protected and preserved by the Egyptian authorities. The inscriptions on the four edges are in Arabic, Hebrew, English and ancient Egyptian hieroglyphs.

== Bridges ==
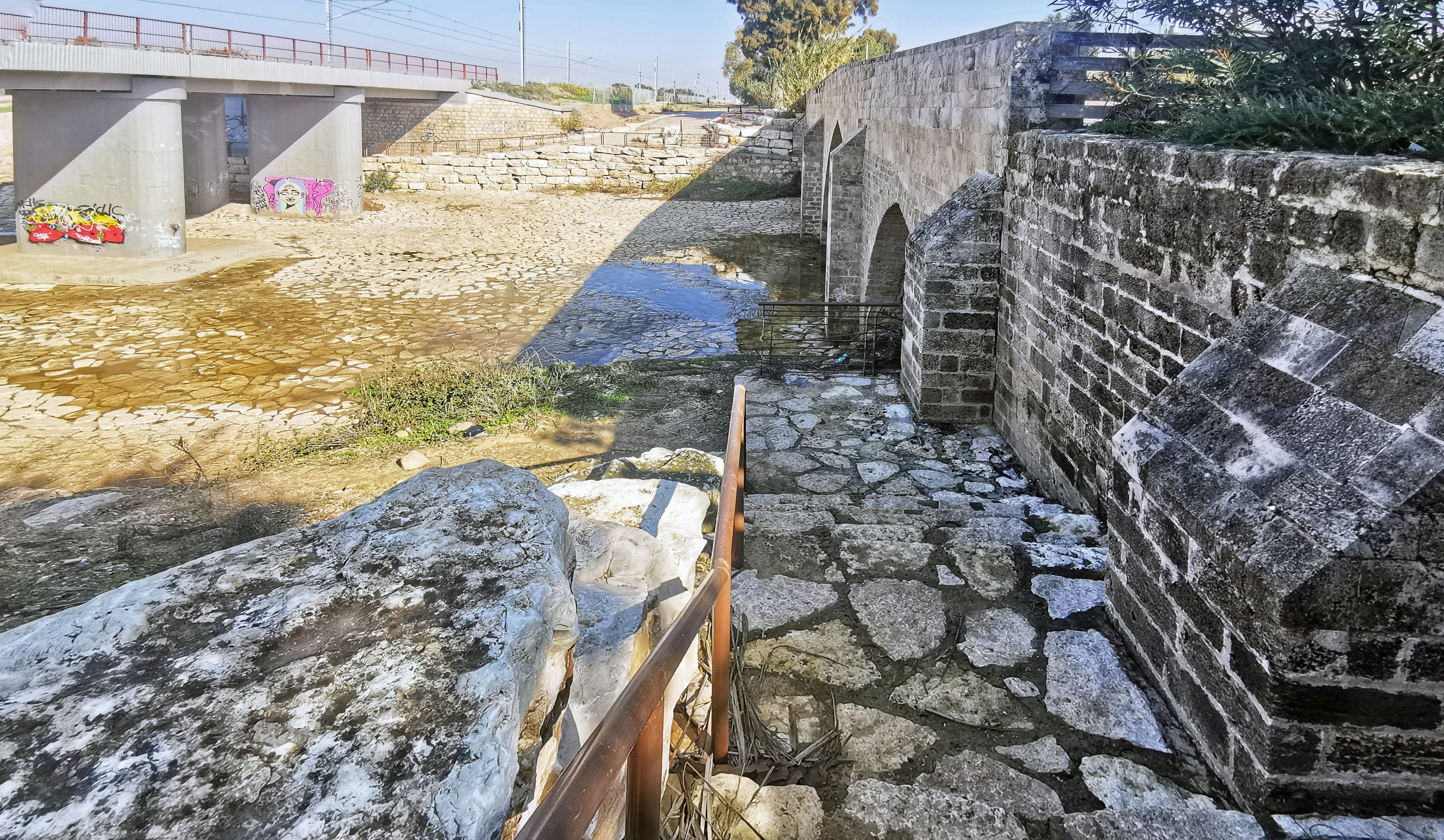
Two of the three bridges at Ad Halom side by side; the railway bridge on the left, and Jisr Isdud on the right.

Jisr Isdud, one of the three bridges at Ad Halom and sometimes known as Ad Halom Bridge, was built over the Lakhish River (Wadi Sukrir/Wadi Fakhira) during the Mamluk period in the 13th century. After numerous armed raids in the area during the 1936–1939 Arab revolt in Palestine, the British authorities set up a series of pillboxes in the area, one of them next to the bridges. After its destruction in the 1948 Arab–Israeli War, the bridge was reconstructed and upgraded.

A railway bridge was added to the west of Jisr Isdud when the coastal railway (Lebanon–Egypt) was laid.

The four-lane Highway 4 required the addition of another parallel bridge, to the east of Jisr Isdud, and also known as Ad Halom bridge.

== Railway station ==
The Israel Railways started to operate a passenger line to Ashdod in the mid-1990s.

The new railway station was established in 2004. In 2005 the line was extended to Ashkelon.

The short distance between the railway and poor planning of the Ad Halom junction on Highway 4 cause traffic jams. The first stage of new Ashdod Interchange, intended to solve the problem, was opened in October 2008.

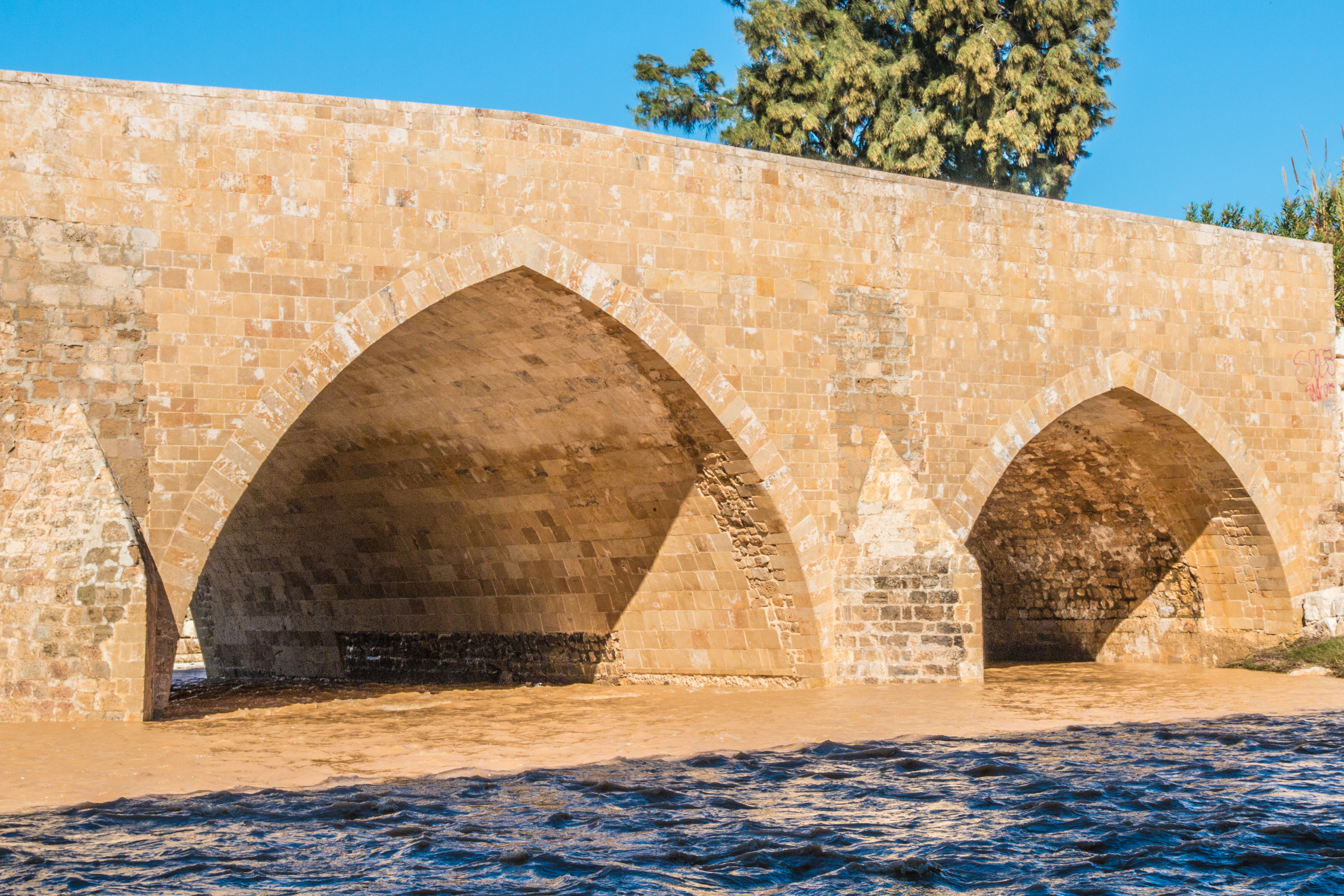
Jisr Isdud after a winter storm

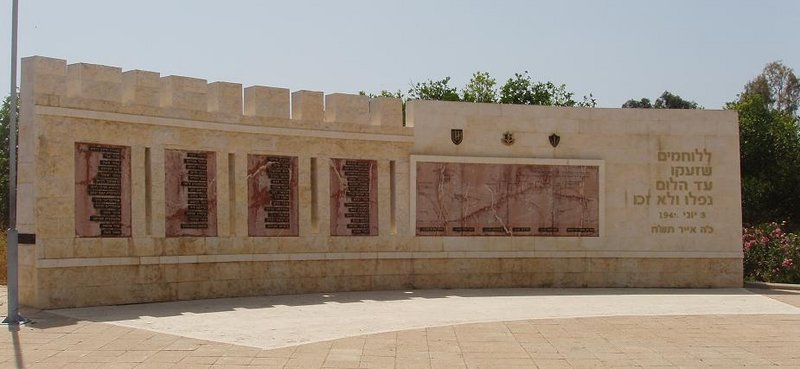
Ad Halom commemoration wall

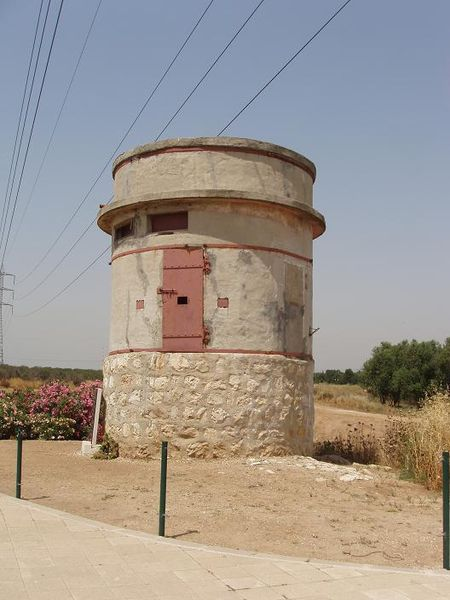
British Mandate-era pillbox

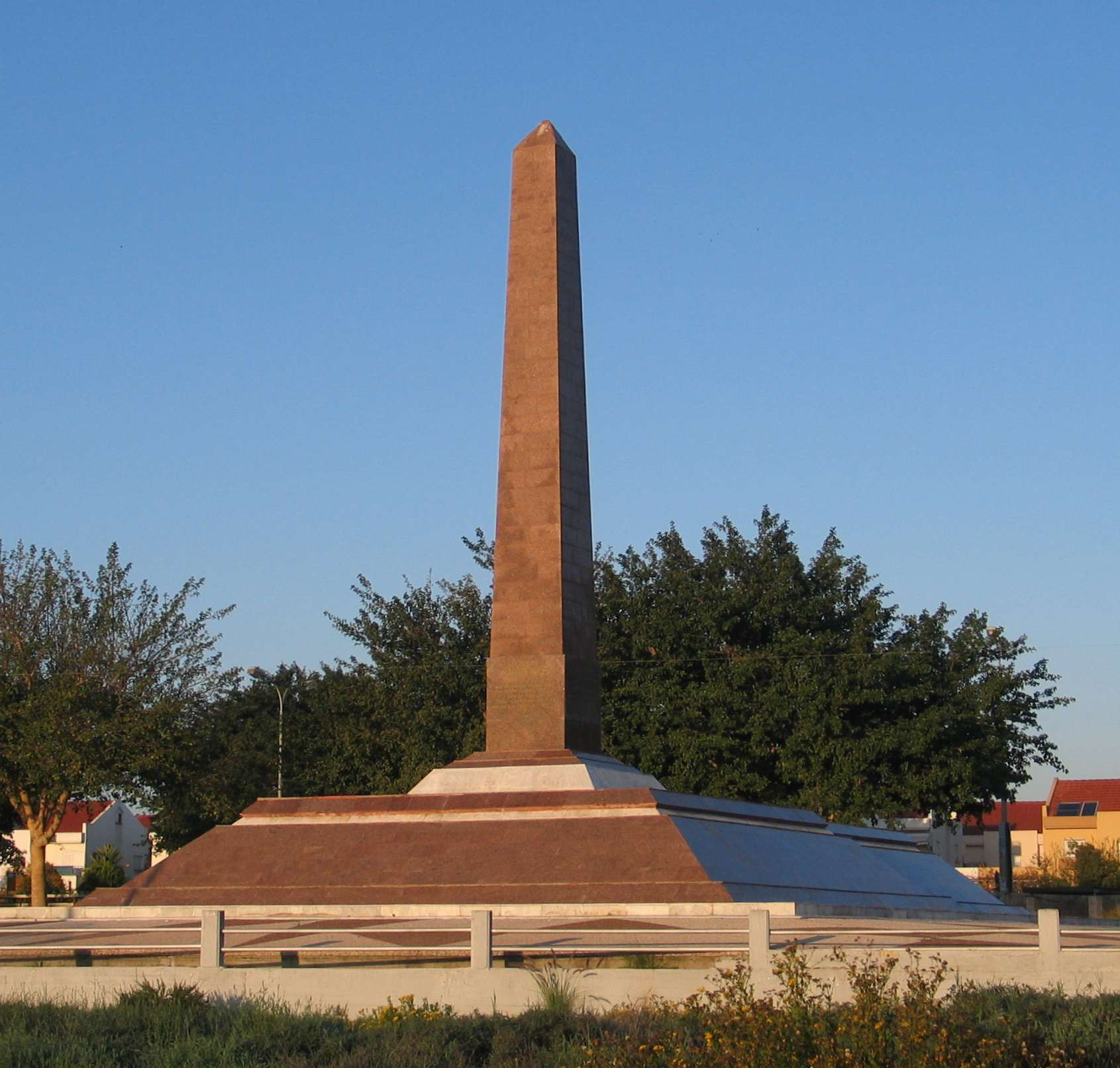
The Egyptian monument

== See also ==
- List of Roman bridges
- Barid, Muslim postal network renewed during Mamluk period (roads, bridges, khans)
  - Jisr al-Ghajar, stone bridge south of Ghajar
  - Daughters of Jacob Bridge (Jisr Banat Yaqub), Mamluk bridge on the upper Jordan River
  - Al-Sinnabra Crusader bridge, with nearby Jisr Umm el-Qanatir/Jisr Semakh and Jisr es-Sidd further downstream
  - Jisr el-Majami bridge over the Jordan, with Mamluk khan
  - Jisr Jindas, Mamluk bridge over the Ayalon near Lod and Ramla, Israel
  - Yibna Bridge or "Nahr Rubin Bridge"
  - Jisr ed-Damiye, bridges over the Jordan (Roman, Mamluk, modern)ed during Mamluk period (roads, bridges, khans)

== Bibliography ==
- Clermont-Ganneau, C.S. (1896). [ARP] Archaeological Researches in Palestine 1873-1874, translated from the French by J. McFarlane. Vol. 2. London: Palestine Exploration Fund. (ARP II, p. 186)
- Conder, C.R.; Kitchener, H.H. (1882). The Survey of Western Palestine: Memoirs of the Topography, Orography, Hydrography, and Archaeology. Vol. 2. London: Committee of the Palestine Exploration Fund. (p. 422)
- Petersen, Andrew (2001). A Gazetteer of Buildings in Muslim Palestine (British Academy Monographs in Archaeology). Vol. I. Oxford University Press. pp. 158−159. ISBN 978-0-19-727011-0. Archived from the original on 2021-05-29.
