= Operation Avak =

Israeli logistical and military operation

Operation Avak (Hebrew: מִבְצָע אָבָק, "Operation Dust") was a logistical and military operation conducted during the second truce of the 1948 Arab–Israeli War and later by the Israeli Air Force (IAF). Its objective was to send supplies to the Israeli enclave in the northwestern Negev desert by air, and create a suitable airfield for this purpose. The operation commenced on August 23, 1948, when the first aircraft landed at a newly created field in Ruhama (raising much dust, giving a name to the operation), and lasted until October 21, when a land corridor was created between the Negev and the rest of Israel.

A total of 417 flights were made during the operation, transporting 2,235 tons of supplies and 1,911 people to the Negev, and evacuating 5,098 people. Initially, Douglas C-54 Skymasters, Lockheed Constellations and Curtiss C-46 Commandos were used, but later, the IAF also made use of Douglas Dakotas and Noorduyn Norsemans. The main military obstacle was a seesaw battle with the Egyptian army at Khirbet Mahaz, lasting between September 29 and October 6.

== Background ==
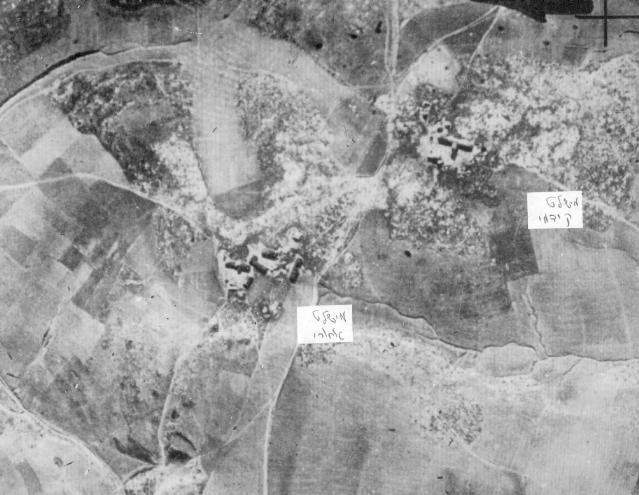
Khirbet Mahaz from the air, 1948

As a response to the Morrison–Grady Plan of 1946, the Jewish Yishuv decided to erect 11 new villages in the northern Negev desert in order to ensure that the territory would become part of a Jewish state in any future political decision. On May 15, 1948, following Israel's declaration of independence, the armies of several Arab states invaded the new state. The Egyptian army advanced along the coastal road, stopping at the Sukreir Bridge and remaining there following Operation Pleshet, an Israeli offensive on the column near the bridge.

The Egyptians then set up positions in the Majdal – Bayt Jibrin road in order to strengthen their hold on the area and disconnect the Negev villages from the rest of Israel. The Israelis made two major attempts to break through the blockade—Operation An-Far and Operation Death to the Invader—but failed to create its own wedge between the Egyptian forces. On July 18, 1948, the second truce to the war came into effect, ending the hostilities with the Negev still divided.

Before the Egyptians created the bypass, United Nations observers visited the area and determined that the Israelis controlled a passageway to the Negev at the beginning of the truce. Israel used this pretext to launch Operation GYS 1 and GYS 2 in July 1948, but failed to secure a permanent corridor, and the Negev remained disconnected. Meanwhile, the situation in the Negev was becoming more dire, as supplies ran out. On August 18, 1948, it was estimated that the combined Negev villages had enough food only for several days.

Also in August 1948, the leadership of Czechoslovakia ordered that the Israeli Air Force supply base at Žatec be shut down. This base, codenamed Etzion, was used in Operation Balak, the shipment of arms to Israel. This freed up a number of IAF transport aircraft that could be used in Israel, although no place existed to hold them. For this purpose, the Ekron Airfield was refitted and expanded, officially opening on August 17. The IAF's Transport Squadron then held an exercise which tested its abilities to move large quantities of goods.

== Preparations ==
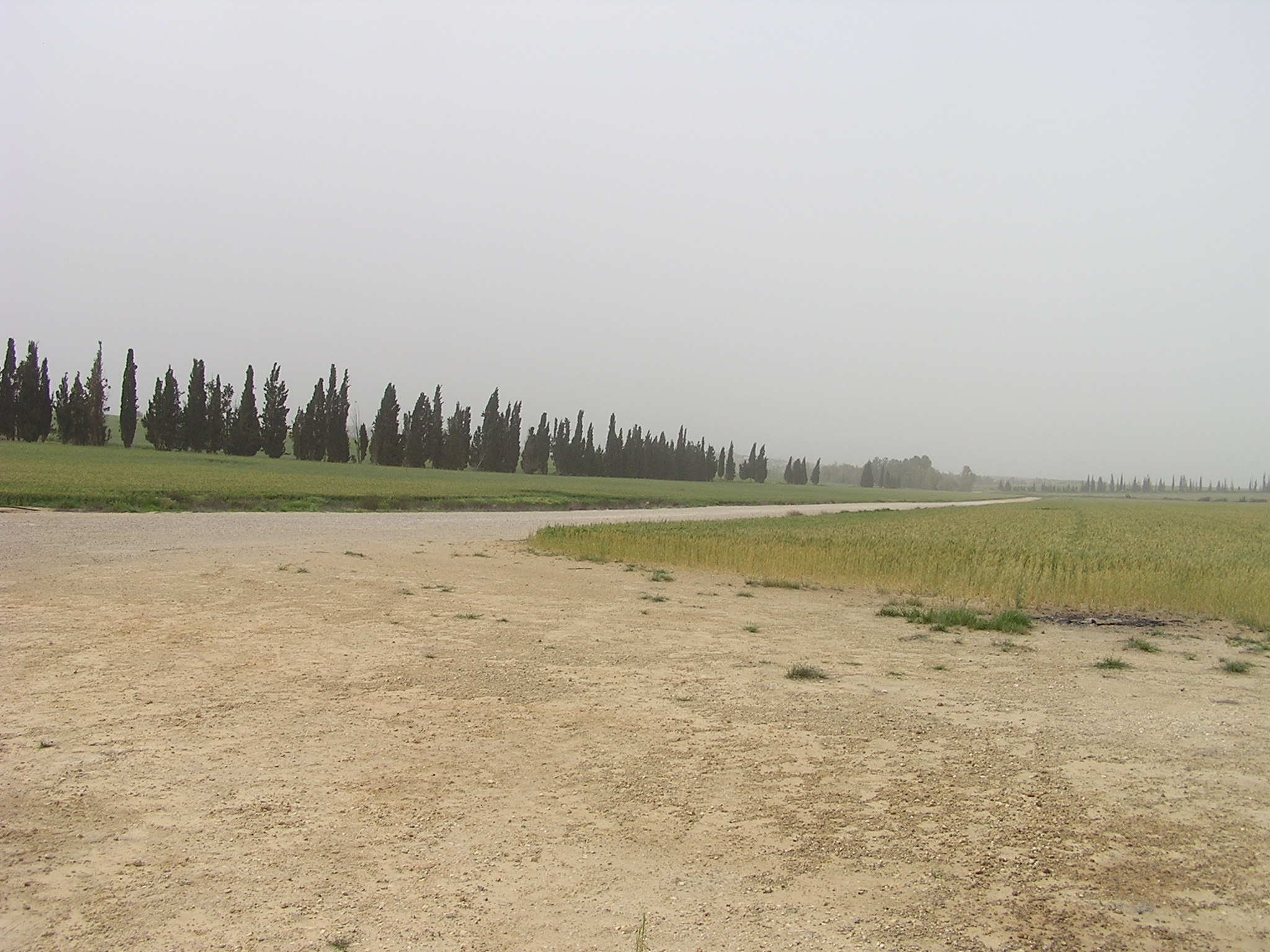
Avak 1 near Ruhama

The decision to send aid to the Negev by air came on August 18, in a top echelon army meeting. The plan was to transport 2,000 tons of food, fuel and supplies; and to replace the Negev Brigade—exhausted and numerically depleted—with the Yiftach Brigade, which participated in Operation GYS but did not otherwise operate in the southern front.

The first task was to find a suitable location for a new airfield. Such a location was found on August 19, between Ruhama and Shoval, and over the next three days, an open space of 1,122 m (3,680 ft.) in length and 35 m (115 ft.) in width was cleared. The supplies for transport where meanwhile transported to the Ekron Airbase. During the following days, much of the Yiftach Brigade covertly made their way to the Negev by land, just west of Kawkaba and Huleikat, bypassing Egyptian positions.

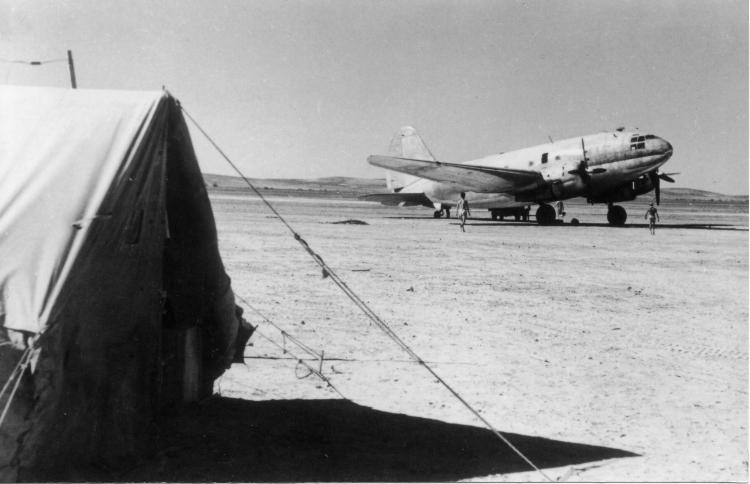
Ruhama airfield during Operation Avak. August 1948

== Flights and ground operations ==
The first flights of Operation Avak took place on August 23, 1948, with four-engined Douglas C-54 Skymaster and Lockheed Constellation aircraft, and twin-engined Curtiss C-46 Commandos. The first aircraft landed at the new Ruhama Airfield at 18:00 on August 23, and carried essential supplies for maintaining the field and assisting later aircraft. It raised a lot of dust (Hebrew: אָבָק, Avak), coining a name for the operation and the landing strip (hence named Avak 1). During the following days, the airfield was fitted with an electric generator and the runway lit with electric lights.

On the first day, 29 tons of supplies were brought to the Negev. While only 14–15 tons were planned to be transported per day, the air force proved capable of increasing the capacity to 75 by the third day of the operation, a pace which it kept up until the end of the operation. Part of the reason why the load was increased had been the fear of heavy rainfall in the coming months that could disrupt the dirt airfield's operations. This created the possibility however, that the extra fuel used by the transporters would deplete the available supply and significantly diminish the IAF's capabilities during the planned large-scale operation in the area (codenamed Ten Plagues, later Yoav). The IDF thus made emergency acquisitions of fuel from other countries. During much of the operation, about 8 flights per day took place, eventually totaling 417.

In order to insure the safety of the new field, nightly patrols and ambushes were conducted by IDF forces. As Yiftach Brigade units reached the individual villages, the Negev Brigade forces were slowly evacuated northwards, leaving their supplies to their replacements. Meanwhile, the search for suitable landing strip locations did not end and on October 10, an area just south of Urim was cleared for Avak 2. The first aircraft landed there on the same night. The Yiftach Brigade, which gained much experience fighting in the Galilee, the Jezreel Valley, and in Operation Danny, was not accustomed to fighting in regions of flat topography, such as that of the Negev. Its troops immediately fanned out and captured a number of outlying positions which represented much of the high ground in the area. This was in contrast to the Negev Brigade which concentrated on defending the villages under its responsibility.

== Battle of Khirbet Mahaz ==
In the beginning of September 1948, the Egyptian army made numerous attempts to disrupt or disable the Ruhama Airfield. The Israeli and Egyptian forces wrestled for control over the tells surround the field, but this ended on September 7–8, when the Yiftach Brigade took Tell al-Quneitra, Tell al-Najjila and Tell al-Muleiha, and fended off an Egyptian counterattack that lasted two days. However, as Yiftach consolidated its positions and expanded to Tell al-Hesi and Khirbet Mahaz (a field cannon's range from the airfield) over the course of the month, the Egyptians mounted a response.

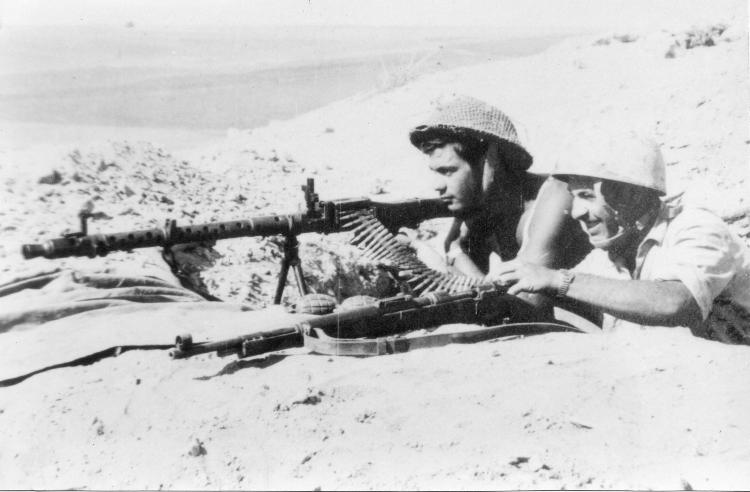
Yiftach Brigade position at Khirbet Mahaz, 1948

Yiftach originally captured the position of Khirbet Mahaz on September 29–30, and on September 30, an Egyptian force under Gamal Abdel Nasser retook it. Yiftach returned on the night of October 1–2 (finding the place empty), and in the following two days managed to repel Egyptian assaults backed by armor and artillery. On October 4, the Egyptians unleashed a heavy barrage of the area and a mechanized force from the 4th Brigade again captured the position. On the same day, the Israelis returned and took it once more. The Egyptians bombarded the position with eight Supermarine Spitfire aircraft on October 5, managing to disrupt Yiftach's forward headquarters at Tell al-Najjila just southwest, but did not dislodge the forces at Khirbet Mahaz.

Egypt renewed its assault on October 6, when twelve armored vehicles backed by infantry attacked Khirbet Mahaz from the north. Israeli field artillery was deployed in Tell al-Najjila in order to help halt the advance. The Egyptians stopped about 150 m away from the position and attempted to encircle it with 2 inch mortar teams. The Israelis sent a half-track force (one of them mounting a cannon) to intercept the attack, including another encirclement attempt. They managed to destroy two Egyptian vehicles. In the afternoon, the Egyptians retreated and took up positions 1.5 km north of Khirbet Mahaz.

== Aftermath ==
Operation Avak was a success and relieved the besieged Israeli forces in the Negev, allowing them to play an active role in Operation Yoav, when a permanent land corridor with the rest of Israel was opened. It significantly raised their morale and fighting ability, as many of the troops had been stranded in the Negev for eight months.

The operation led to the transformation of the Negev Brigade, which was completely re-supplied (having left their supplies to the Yiftach Brigade), and gained about 1,000 new soldiers.
