= List of Billboard number-one singles of 1948 =

This is a list of number-one songs in the United States during the year 1948 according to Billboard magazine. Prior to the creation of the Billboard Hot 100, Billboard published multiple singles charts each week. In 1948, the following four charts were produced:

- Best Sellers in Stores – ranked the biggest selling singles in retail stores, as reported by merchants surveyed throughout the country.
- Most Played by Jockeys – ranked the most played songs on United States radio stations, as reported by radio disc jockeys and radio stations.
- Most Played in Jukeboxes – ranked the most played songs in jukeboxes across the United States.
- Honor Roll of Hits – a composite ten-position song chart which combined data from the three charts above along with three other component charts. It served as The Billboard's lead chart until the introduction of the Hot 100 in 1958 and would remain in print until 1963.

Note: In the issue dated January 10, May 1, and October 9, The Billboard reported a tie for the number-one single on one of its charts.

Issue date	Best-Selling Popular Retail Records	Records Most-Played on the Air	Most-Played Juke Box Records	Honor Roll of Hits	Ref.
January 3	"Ballerina"; Vaughn Monroe and His Orchestra	"Ballerina"; Vaughn Monroe and His Orchestra	"Ballerina"; Vaughn Monroe and His Orchestra	"Ballerina"	
January 10	"Ballerina"; Vaughn Monroe and His Orchestra	"Ballerina"; Vaughn Monroe and His Orchestra "Too Fat Polka"; Arthur Godfrey with Orchestra under the direction of Archie Bleyer	"Ballerina"; Vaughn Monroe and His Orchestra	"Ballerina"	
January 17	"Ballerina"; Vaughn Monroe and His Orchestra	"Ballerina"; Vaughn Monroe and His Orchestra	"Ballerina"; Vaughn Monroe and His Orchestra	"Ballerina"	
January 24	"Ballerina"; Vaughn Monroe and His Orchestra	"Ballerina"; Vaughn Monroe and His Orchestra	"Ballerina"; Vaughn Monroe and His Orchestra	"Ballerina"	
January 31	"Ballerina"; Vaughn Monroe and His Orchestra	"Ballerina"; Vaughn Monroe and His Orchestra	"Ballerina"; Vaughn Monroe and His Orchestra	"Ballerina"	
February 7	"Ballerina"; Vaughn Monroe and His Orchestra	"Ballerina"; Vaughn Monroe and His Orchestra	"Ballerina"; Vaughn Monroe and His Orchestra	"Ballerina"	
February 14	"Ballerina"; Vaughn Monroe and His Orchestra	"Ballerina"; Vaughn Monroe and His Orchestra	"Ballerina"; Vaughn Monroe and His Orchestra	"Ballerina"	
February 21	"I'm Looking Over a Four-Leaf Clover"; Art Mooney and His Orchestra	"I'm Looking Over a Four-Leaf Clover"; Art Mooney and His Orchestra	"I'm Looking Over a Four-Leaf Clover"; Art Mooney and His Orchestra	"I'm Looking Over a Four Leaf Clover"	
February 28	"I'm Looking Over a Four-Leaf Clover"; Art Mooney and His Orchestra	"I'm Looking Over a Four-Leaf Clover"; Art Mooney and His Orchestra	"I'm Looking Over a Four-Leaf Clover"; Art Mooney and His Orchestra	"I'm Looking Over a Four Leaf Clover"	
March 6	"I'm Looking Over a Four-Leaf Clover"; Art Mooney and His Orchestra	"I'm Looking Over a Four-Leaf Clover"; Art Mooney and His Orchestra	"I'm Looking Over a Four-Leaf Clover"; Art Mooney and His Orchestra	"Now Is the Hour"	
March 13	"Mañana (Is Soon Enough for Me)"; Peggy Lee with Dave Barbour and the Brazilians	"I'm Looking Over a Four-Leaf Clover"; Art Mooney and His Orchestra	"I'm Looking Over a Four-Leaf Clover"; Art Mooney and His Orchestra	"I'm Looking Over a Four Leaf Clover"	
March 20	"Mañana (Is Soon Enough for Me)"; Peggy Lee with Dave Barbour and the Brazilians	"Mañana (Is Soon Enough for Me)"; Peggy Lee with Dave Barbour and the Brazilians	"I'm Looking Over a Four-Leaf Clover"; Art Mooney and His Orchestra	"Now Is the Hour"	
March 27	"Mañana (Is Soon Enough for Me)"; Peggy Lee with Dave Barbour and the Brazilians	"Mañana (Is Soon Enough for Me)"; Peggy Lee with Dave Barbour and the Brazilians	"Mañana (Is Soon Enough for Me)"; Peggy Lee with Dave Barbour and the Brazilians	"Now Is the Hour"	
April 3	"Mañana (Is Soon Enough for Me)"; Peggy Lee with Dave Barbour and the Brazilians	"Mañana (Is Soon Enough for Me)"; Peggy Lee with Dave Barbour and the Brazilians	"Mañana (Is Soon Enough for Me)"; Peggy Lee with Dave Barbour and the Brazilians	"Now Is the Hour"	
April 10	"Mañana (Is Soon Enough for Me)"; Peggy Lee with Dave Barbour and the Brazilians	"Mañana (Is Soon Enough for Me)"; Peggy Lee with Dave Barbour and the Brazilians	"Mañana (Is Soon Enough for Me)"; Peggy Lee with Dave Barbour and the Brazilians	"Now Is the Hour"	
April 17	"Mañana (Is Soon Enough for Me)"; Peggy Lee with Dave Barbour and the Brazilians	"Mañana (Is Soon Enough for Me)"; Peggy Lee with Dave Barbour and the Brazilians	"Mañana (Is Soon Enough for Me)"; Peggy Lee with Dave Barbour and the Brazilians	"Now Is the Hour"	
April 24	"Mañana (Is Soon Enough for Me)"; Peggy Lee with Dave Barbour and the Brazilians	"Mañana (Is Soon Enough for Me)"; Peggy Lee with Dave Barbour and the Brazilians	"Now Is the Hour"; Bing Crosby with the Ken Darby Choir	"Now Is the Hour"	
May 1	"Mañana (Is Soon Enough for Me)"; Peggy Lee with Dave Barbour and the Brazilians	"Mañana (Is Soon Enough for Me)"; Peggy Lee with Dave Barbour and the Brazilians	"Mañana (Is Soon Enough for Me)"; Peggy Lee with Dave Barbour and the Brazilians "Now Is the Hour"; Bing Crosby with the Ken Darby Choir	"Now Is the Hour"	
May 8	"Mañana (Is Soon Enough for Me)"; Peggy Lee with Dave Barbour and the Brazilians	"Nature Boy"; King Cole with Orchestra conducted by Frank De Vol	"Now Is the Hour"; Bing Crosby with the Ken Darby Choir	"Now Is the Hour"	
May 15	"Nature Boy"; King Cole with Orchestra conducted by Frank De Vol	"Nature Boy"; King Cole with Orchestra conducted by Frank De Vol	"Now Is the Hour"; Bing Crosby with the Ken Darby Choir	"Now Is the Hour"	
May 22	"Nature Boy"; King Cole with Orchestra conducted by Frank De Vol	"Nature Boy"; King Cole with Orchestra conducted by Frank De Vol	"You Can't Be True, Dear"; Ken Griffin with Jerry Wayne	"Nature Boy"	
May 29	"Nature Boy"; King Cole with Orchestra conducted by Frank De Vol	"Nature Boy"; King Cole with Orchestra conducted by Frank De Vol	"You Can't Be True, Dear"; Ken Griffin with Jerry Wayne	"Nature Boy"	
June 5	"Nature Boy"; King Cole with Orchestra conducted by Frank De Vol	"Nature Boy"; King Cole with Orchestra conducted by Frank De Vol	"You Can't Be True, Dear"; Ken Griffin with Jerry Wayne	"Nature Boy"	
June 12	"Nature Boy"; King Cole with Orchestra conducted by Frank De Vol	"Nature Boy"; King Cole with Orchestra conducted by Frank De Vol	"You Can't Be True, Dear"; Ken Griffin with Jerry Wayne	"Nature Boy"	
June 19	"Nature Boy"; King Cole with Orchestra conducted by Frank De Vol	"Nature Boy"; King Cole with Orchestra conducted by Frank De Vol	"You Can't Be True, Dear"; Ken Griffin with Jerry Wayne	"Nature Boy"	
June 26	"Nature Boy"; King Cole with Orchestra conducted by Frank De Vol	"Nature Boy"; King Cole with Orchestra conducted by Frank De Vol	"You Can't Be True, Dear"; Ken Griffin with Jerry Wayne	"You Can't Be True, Dear"	
July 3	"Woody Woodpecker"; Kay Kyser and his Orchestra with Gloria Wood	"Woody Woodpecker"; Kay Kyser and his Orchestra with Gloria Wood	"You Can't Be True, Dear"; Ken Griffin with Jerry Wayne	"You Can't Be True, Dear"	
July 10	"Woody Woodpecker"; Kay Kyser and his Orchestra with Gloria Wood	"Woody Woodpecker"; Kay Kyser and his Orchestra with Gloria Wood	"Woody Woodpecker"; Kay Kyser and his Orchestra with Gloria Wood	"You Can't Be True, Dear"	
July 17	"Woody Woodpecker"; Kay Kyser and his Orchestra with Gloria Wood	"Woody Woodpecker"; Kay Kyser and his Orchestra with Gloria Wood	"Woody Woodpecker"; Kay Kyser and his Orchestra with Gloria Wood	"Woody Woodpecker"	
July 24	"Woody Woodpecker"; Kay Kyser and his Orchestra with Gloria Wood	"Woody Woodpecker"; Kay Kyser and his Orchestra with Gloria Wood	"Woody Woodpecker"; Kay Kyser and his Orchestra with Gloria Wood	"Woody Woodpecker"	
July 31	"Woody Woodpecker"; Kay Kyser and his Orchestra with Gloria Wood	"Woody Woodpecker"; Kay Kyser and his Orchestra with Gloria Wood	"Woody Woodpecker"; Kay Kyser and his Orchestra with Gloria Wood	"Woody Woodpecker"	
August 7	"Woody Woodpecker"; Kay Kyser and his Orchestra with Gloria Wood	"Woody Woodpecker"; Kay Kyser and his Orchestra with Gloria Wood	"Woody Woodpecker"; Kay Kyser and his Orchestra with Gloria Wood	"My Happiness"	
August 14	"You Call Everybody Darlin'"; Al Trace and His New Orchestra with Bob Vincent	"Love Somebody"; Doris Day and Buddy Clark with Orchestra under the direction of George Siravo	"Woody Woodpecker"; Kay Kyser and his Orchestra with Gloria Wood	"My Happiness"	
August 21	"You Call Everybody Darlin'"; Al Trace and His New Orchestra with Bob Vincent	"Love Somebody"; Doris Day and Buddy Clark with Orchestra under the direction of George Siravo	"You Call Everybody Darlin'"; Al Trace and His New Orchestra with Bob Vincent	"My Happiness"	
August 28	"Twelfth Street Rag"; Pee Wee Hunt and His Orchestra	"Love Somebody"; Doris Day and Buddy Clark with Orchestra under the direction of George Siravo	"You Call Everybody Darlin'"; Al Trace and His New Orchestra with Bob Vincent	"My Happiness"	
September 4	"Twelfth Street Rag"; Pee Wee Hunt and His Orchestra	"Love Somebody"; Doris Day and Buddy Clark with Orchestra under the direction of George Siravo	"You Call Everybody Darlin'"; Al Trace and His New Orchestra with Bob Vincent	"You Call Everybody Darlin'"	
September 11	"Twelfth Street Rag"; Pee Wee Hunt and His Orchestra	"Love Somebody"; Doris Day and Buddy Clark with Orchestra under the direction of George Siravo	"You Call Everybody Darlin'"; Al Trace and His New Orchestra with Bob Vincent	"You Call Everybody Darlin'"	
September 18	"Twelfth Street Rag"; Pee Wee Hunt and His Orchestra	"Twelfth Street Rag"; Pee Wee Hunt and His Orchestra	"You Call Everybody Darlin'"; Al Trace and His New Orchestra with Bob Vincent	"You Call Everybody Darlin'"	
September 25	"Twelfth Street Rag"; Pee Wee Hunt and His Orchestra	"Twelfth Street Rag"; Pee Wee Hunt and His Orchestra	"You Call Everybody Darlin'"; Al Trace and His New Orchestra with Bob Vincent	"You Call Everybody Darlin'"	
October 2	"Twelfth Street Rag"; Pee Wee Hunt and His Orchestra	"Twelfth Street Rag"; Pee Wee Hunt and His Orchestra	"Twelfth Street Rag"; Pee Wee Hunt and His Orchestra	"You Call Everybody Darlin'"	
October 9	"A Tree in the Meadow"; Margaret Whiting	"A Tree in the Meadow"; Margaret Whiting "Twelfth Street Rag"; Pee Wee Hunt and His Orchestra	"Twelfth Street Rag"; Pee Wee Hunt and His Orchestra	"You Call Everybody Darlin'"	
October 16	"A Tree in the Meadow"; Margaret Whiting	"A Tree in the Meadow"; Margaret Whiting	"Twelfth Street Rag"; Pee Wee Hunt and His Orchestra	"A Tree in the Meadow"	
October 23	"Twelfth Street Rag"; Pee Wee Hunt and His Orchestra	"Twelfth Street Rag"; Pee Wee Hunt and His Orchestra	"Twelfth Street Rag"; Pee Wee Hunt and His Orchestra	"A Tree in the Meadow"	
October 30	"Twelfth Street Rag"; Pee Wee Hunt and His Orchestra	"A Tree in the Meadow"; Margaret Whiting	"Twelfth Street Rag"; Pee Wee Hunt and His Orchestra	"A Tree in the Meadow"	
November 6	"Buttons and Bows"; Dinah Shore and her Happy Valley Boys	"A Tree in the Meadow"; Margaret Whiting	"Twelfth Street Rag"; Pee Wee Hunt and His Orchestra	"Buttons and Bows"	
November 13	"Buttons and Bows"; Dinah Shore and her Happy Valley Boys	"A Tree in the Meadow"; Margaret Whiting	"Buttons and Bows"; Dinah Shore and her Happy Valley Boys	"Buttons and Bows"	
November 20	"Buttons and Bows"; Dinah Shore and her Happy Valley Boys	"Buttons and Bows"; Dinah Shore and her Happy Valley Boys	"Buttons and Bows"; Dinah Shore and her Happy Valley Boys	"Buttons and Bows"	
November 27	"Buttons and Bows"; Dinah Shore and her Happy Valley Boys	"Buttons and Bows"; Dinah Shore and her Happy Valley Boys	"Buttons and Bows"; Dinah Shore and her Happy Valley Boys	"Buttons and Bows"	
December 4	"Buttons and Bows"; Dinah Shore and her Happy Valley Boys	"Buttons and Bows"; Dinah Shore and her Happy Valley Boys	"Buttons and Bows"; Dinah Shore and her Happy Valley Boys	"Buttons and Bows"	
December 11	"Buttons and Bows"; Dinah Shore and her Happy Valley Boys	"Buttons and Bows"; Dinah Shore and her Happy Valley Boys	"Buttons and Bows"; Dinah Shore and her Happy Valley Boys	"Buttons and Bows"	
December 18	"Buttons and Bows"; Dinah Shore and her Happy Valley Boys	"Buttons and Bows"; Dinah Shore and her Happy Valley Boys	"Buttons and Bows"; Dinah Shore and her Happy Valley Boys	"Buttons and Bows"	
December 25	"Buttons and Bows"; Dinah Shore and her Happy Valley Boys	"All I Want for Christmas (Is My Two Front Teeth)"; Spike Jones and his City Slickers with George Rock	"Buttons and Bows"; Dinah Shore and her Happy Valley Boys	"Buttons and Bows"	

== Number-one artists ==
List of number-one artists by total weeks at number one
Artist	Weeks at #1
Peggy Lee	9
Dinah Shore	8
Pee Wee Hunt	8
Nat King Cole	7
Vaughn Monroe	7
Kay Kyser	6
Art Mooney	3
Al Trace	2
Margaret Whiting	2

== See also ==
- 1948 in music
