= Lakhish River =

River in Israel

Coordinates: 31°48′5.43″N 34°40′19.64″E

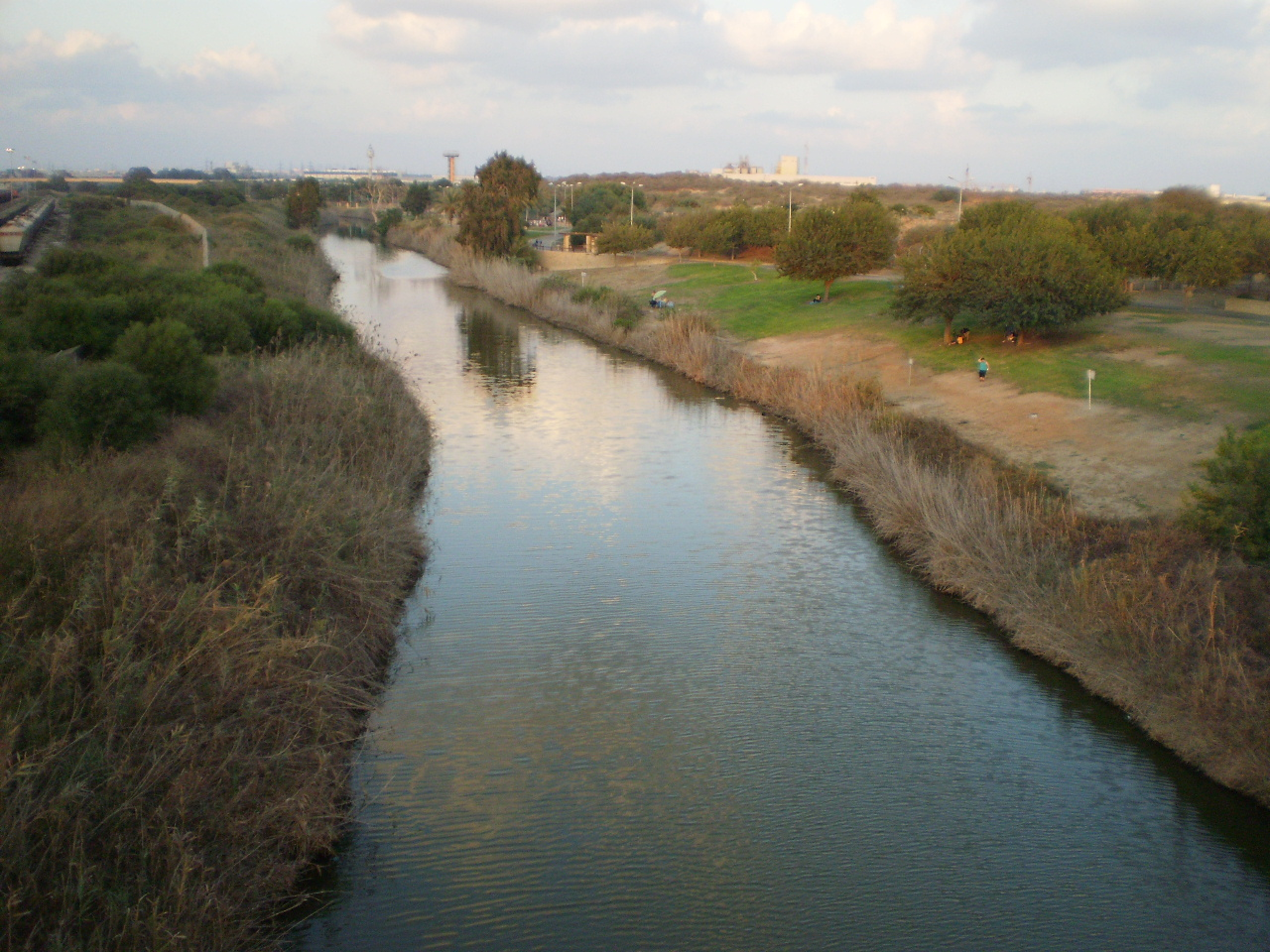
Lakhish river in Ashdod

Lakhish River (Hebrew: נחל לכיש, Naḥal Lakhish) is a river in Israel that flows into the Mediterranean Sea at the city of Ashdod. In Arabic it is known as Wadi Kabiba (inland section) and Wadi Sukhrir (Ashdod section).

== History ==
The basin square is 1,020 km and the length is about 70 km. The river sources are in the southern West Bank and the stream often floods during the rainy season.

The river is polluted by industrial waste and sewage, due in part to its location separating the industrial zone and port from the rest of Ashdod. A rehabilitation program has been performed over the last years with mixed success.

== See also ==
- Geography of Israel
