= June 1948 =

Month of 1948

<<	June 1948					>>
Su	Mo	Tu	We	Th	Fr	Sa
		1	2	3	4	5
6	7	8	9	10	11	12
13	14	15	16	17	18	19
20	21	22	23	24	25	26
27	28	29	30

The following events occurred in June 1948:

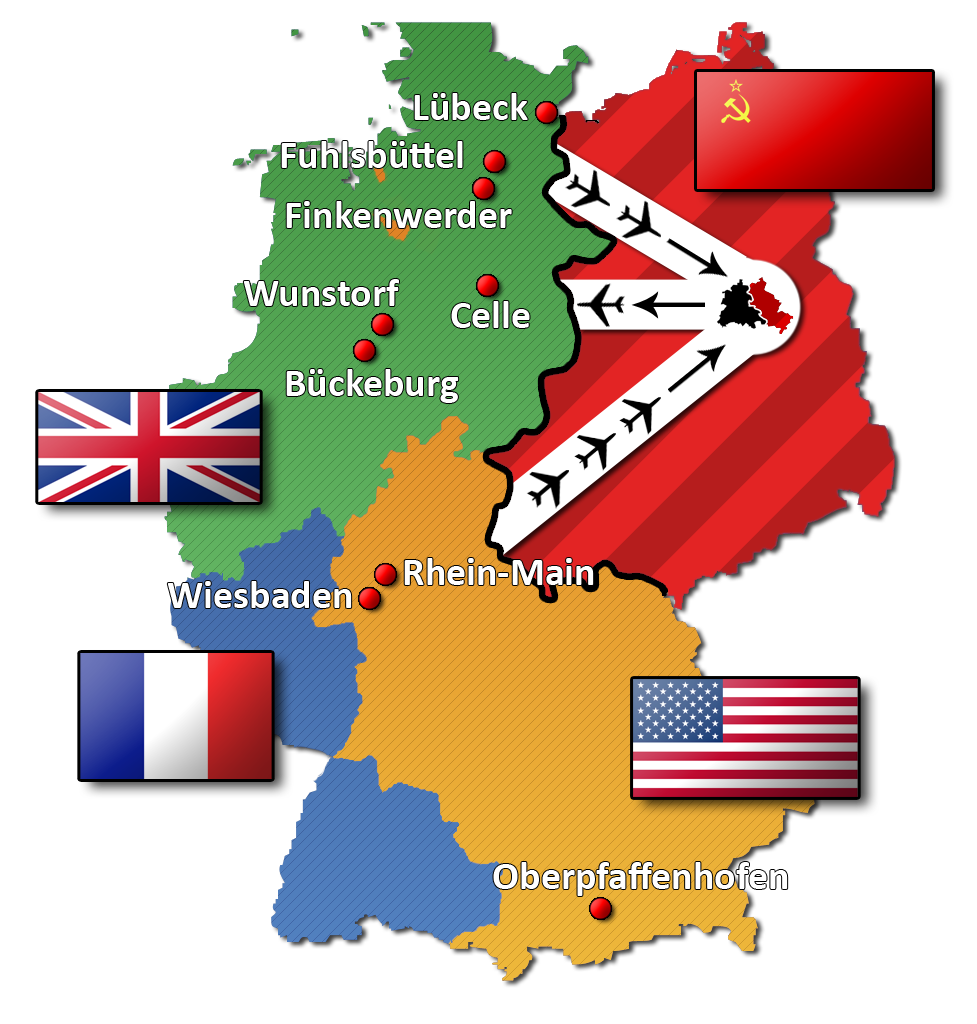
June 24: Berlin Blockade Begins

== June 1, 1948 (Tuesday) ==
- Israeli planes bombed Amman in the first attack on an Arab capital city. Arab officials said six Arab civilians were killed.
- Israel and the Arab League both announced that they were willing to accept the UN's request for a four-week ceasefire.
- The Republican Party presidential primaries concluded.
- Disappearance of Virginia Carpenter: 21-year old Mary Virginia Carpenter went missing in Denton, Texas in a much-publicized case that remains unsolved.
- Mexico City's government-owned Hotel del Prado opened without the traditional blessing of Catholic Archbishop Luis María Martínez due to the inclusion of a controversial mural painted by Diego Rivera depicting 19th century atheist writer Ignacio Ramírez holding an open book with the words "God does not exist." Rivera suggested that the Archbishop "bless the hotel but condemn my mural."
- Sports goods brand, Puma was founded in West Germany. (now Germany)
- Born: Powers Boothe, actor, in Snyder, Texas (d. 2017); Tom Sneva. race car driver, in Spokane, Washington

== June 2, 1948 (Wednesday) ==
- The UN Security Council decided that both Israel and the Arab states had accepted unconditionally its demand for a four-week truce despite reservations by both sides, and asked the UN mediator Folke Bernadotte to set a time for the ceasefire order to go into effect.
- The first Battle of Negba was fought. The Egyptian army attacked the kibbutz of Negba but was repulsed.
- The British House of Lords voted 181–28 to reject the five-year moratorium on capital punishment that the House of Commons had approved.
- About 3,500 people attended a rally at the Washington Monument organized by followers of Henry A. Wallace to urge enactment of civil rights legislation and protest the Mundt-Nixon Communist Control Bill.
- Born: Jerry Mathers, actor, in Sioux City, Iowa
- Died: hanged at Landsberg Prison for crimes against humanity:
  - Viktor Brack, 43, German Nazi;
  - Karl Brandt, 44, German Nazi SS officer;
  - Karl Gebhardt, 50, German doctor;
  - Waldemar Hoven, 45, German Nazi physician;
  - Joachim Mrugowsky, 42, German Nazi hygienist;
  - Wolfram Sievers, 42, German Nazi

== June 3, 1948 (Thursday) ==
- A referendum was held in the Dominion of Newfoundland to decide its political future. None of the three options (join Canada, regain independence or remain under British rule) achieved the required 50% approval, so a second referendum was scheduled for July 22 with the least popular option (remain with Britain) dropped.
- Operation Pleshet ended in Egyptian tactical victory when the Israeli attack was repulsed.
- Higinio Moríñigo was overthrown as President of Paraguay in a bloodless coup. Juan Manuel Frutos took over as provisional president.
- Construction of the Crazy Horse Memorial in the Black Hills near Custer, South Dakota began with the first dynamite blast.

== June 4, 1948 (Friday) ==
- Daniel François Malan became 3rd Prime Minister of South Africa. The era of apartheid had begun.
- Ohio's State Secretary ruled that the group supporting Henry A. Wallace for president was not entitled to appear on the state's ballot, calling attention to the fact that the group's original affidavit failed to include a statement that it was not directed by a foreign government. Wallace said that his party would fight the ruling in court.
- Buckingham Palace announced that Princess Elizabeth would be undertaking no public engagements after the end of June, indirectly confirming rumors that she was due to have a baby in the fall.
- Born: Bob Champion, jump jockey, in Guisborough, England; Beverley Diamond pianist and ethnomusicologist, in Kitchener, Ontario, Canada; David Haskell, actor, in Stockton, California (d. 2000)

== June 5, 1948 (Saturday) ==
- The United States Atomic Energy Commission announced plans to build the world's largest atom-smasher at Los Alamos, New Mexico at a cost of $2 million.
- My Love won the Epsom Derby.
- Died: Glen Edwards, 30, American test pilot (plane crash)

== June 6, 1948 (Sunday) ==
- Presidential elections were held in Ecuador, resulting in a narrow victory for Galo Plaza.
- The Battle of Nitzanim began between Israeli and Egyptian forces over the kibbutz of Nitzanim.
- Another pastoral letter from Primate József Mindszenty was read in Hungarian Catholic churches, telling parishioners to stop consuming government-controlled radio and newspapers.
- Born: Richard Sinclair, bassist, singer and founding member of the rock band Caravan, in Canterbury, England
- Died: Louis Lumière, 83, French film pioneer

== June 7, 1948 (Monday) ==
- Edvard Beneš resigned as President of Czechoslovakia. The public explanation given was his health and the "overall political situation," but a United Press report indicated that he disapproved of the Ninth-of-May Constitution and the conduct of the recent elections.
- The first of two days of anti-Jewish rioting broke out in the towns of Oujda and Jerada in the French protectorate in Morocco.

== June 8, 1948 (Tuesday) ==
- Czech Prime Minister Klement Gottwald assumed the functions of the President and signed the Ninth-of-May Constitution into law.
- The first vehicle to bear the Porsche name was registered: the Porsche 356 sports car.
- NBC's Texaco Star Theater made the jump from radio to television. It would be one of the earliest hit TV shows and give host Milton Berle the nickname of "Mister Television".
- Born: Jürgen von der Lippe, television presenter and comedian, in Bad Salzuflen, Germany

== June 9, 1948 (Wednesday) ==
- Israel and the Arab League agreed to observe the four-week ceasefire beginning Friday at 6 a.m. Greenwich Mean Time.
- US President Harry S. Truman began a whirlwind two-day tour of the state of Washington that was described as "non-political" but nevertheless served as a tune-up for the upcoming presidential campaign. During his first speech in Spokane, Truman denounced the 80th United States Congress for having what he famously called a "do-nothing" record.
- Born: Gudrun Schyman, politician, in Täby, Sweden; Gary Thorne, sports announcer, in Bangor, Maine

== June 10, 1948 (Thursday) ==
- The Battle of Nitzanim ended in Egyptian victory.
- By a vote of 78–10, the US Senate passed a selective draft bill authorizing up to 250,000 men aged 19 to 25 to be called for up to two years of military service.
- In Puerto Rico Law 53, better known as the Gag Law, was signed into law with the goal of suppressing the independence movement in Puerto Rico. The law would remain in force until 1957.
- The radio anthology series Hallmark Playhouse premiered on CBS.

== June 11, 1948 (Friday) ==
- The Arab-Israeli truce went into effect.
- The Danish passenger steamship Kjobenhavn struck a mine in the Kattegat and sank with the loss of 141 of the 402 people aboard.
- A rhesus monkey named Albert I became the first primate astronaut when he was launched inside a V-2 rocket (itself designated "Albert") in White Sands, New Mexico with virtually no publicity. He died of suffocation during the flight.
- Died: Hugh Dorsey, 76, American lawyer and 62nd Governor of Georgia

== June 12, 1948 (Saturday) ==
- President Truman made a foreign policy speech in Berkeley, California declaring that his country would not allow the world to be split into two spheres of influence dominated by the US and the Soviet Union.
- 1948 Anti-Jewish riots in Tripolitania: Riots broke out between the Arab and Jewish communities of Tripoli, resulting in the deaths of 13-14 Jews and 4 Arabs and destruction of 280 Jewish homes.
- The Women's Armed Services Integration Act was enacted in the United States, allowing women to permanently serve in the US military.
- Citation won the Belmont Stakes to complete the Triple Crown of horse racing.
- Born: Len Wein, comic book writer and editor, in New York City (d. 2017)

== June 13, 1948 (Sunday) ==
- In the first immigration case since the Arab-Israeli truce began, the liner Kedmah anchored in Tel Aviv from Marseille carrying 420 people. Under the truce terms, all men between the ages of 14 and 45 were to be interned in a refugee camp if they immigrated to Israel during the four-week truce period.
- Born: Garnet Bailey, ice hockey player, in Lloydminster, Saskatchewan, Canada (d. 2001)
- Died: Osamu Dazai, 38, Japanese author (suicide by drowning); Jimmy Frise, 56, Canadian cartoonist

== June 14, 1948 (Monday) ==
- Klement Gottwald was unanimously elected President of Czechoslovakia by the National Assembly.
- Russian authorities in Germany halted shipment of coal from the British occupation zone to Berlin and closed the Elbe River bridge on the main Berlin-Helmstedt highway, allegedly for "repairs."
- Half of London's dockworkers began a wildcat strike in protest of eleven dockers being punished for refusing to handle a "dirty" cargo of zinc oxide unless they were paid more.
- A prototype of TV Guide appeared on newsstands in New York, originally called TeleVision Guide. The first cover subject was Gloria Swanson, who at the time was starring in a short-lived television series, The Gloria Swanson Hour.
- Born: Linda Clifford, singer and actress, in New York City; Steve Hunter, rock guitarist, in Decatur, Illinois; Laurence Yep, writer, in San Francisco, California
- Died: Gertrude Atherton, 90, American author

== June 15, 1948 (Tuesday) ==
- Russia accepted a US proposal to arrange a conference on Danube River navigation.
- The Western Tai'an Campaign ended in Communist victory.
- The People's Daily newspaper group was established.
- The Detroit Tigers hosted their first night game at Briggs Stadium, defeating the Philadelphia Athletics 4-1 before a crowd of 54,480. Wrigley Field in Chicago was now the only major league ballpark to not have lights installed, and would continue to hold out until 1988.
- The horror comedy film Abbott and Costello Meet Frankenstein was released, marking the first of several films in which the comedy team of Abbott and Costello meet classic characters from the Universal Horror series of films.
- Born: Paul Michiels, singer and songwriter, in Heist-op-den-Berg, Belgium

== June 16, 1948 (Wednesday) ==
- The twelve-year guerrilla war known as the Malayan Emergency began between British Commonwealth forces and the Malayan National Liberation Army. The first overt act of the war occurred when three European plantation managers were killed at Sungai Siput by members of the Malayan Communist Party.
- Hungarian Parliament nationalized the country's religious schools over the bitter protests of the Catholic Church.

== June 17, 1948 (Thursday) ==
- United Airlines Flight 624: A Douglas DC-6 airliner crashed near Aristes, Pennsylvania, killing all 39 passengers and 4 crew aboard.
- The Battle of Shangcai began during the Chinese Civil War.
- US Congress overturned a presidential veto for the third time in four days. By a vote of 297–102, the House overrode Truman's veto of the Reed-Bulwinkle Bill exempting railway rate agreements from antitrust laws.
- The US Senate shelved the controversial Mundt-Nixon bill after deciding there was not enough time left to consider it during that congressional session. The bill would be revived in 1950 as the Mundt–Ferguson Communist Registration Bill.
- Born: Dave Concepción, baseball player, in Ocumare de la Costa, Venezuela
- Died: Earl Carroll, 54, American theatrical producer, director, songwriter and composer (killed on United Airlines Flight 624); Changampuzha Krishna Pillai, 36, Malayalam poet (tuberculosis); Beryl Wallace, 39?, American dancer, singer and actress (killed on United Airlines Flight 624)

== June 18, 1948 (Friday) ==
- The United Nations Commission on Human Rights completed over two years of work on a draft for a Universal Declaration of Human Rights. The draft was approved by a vote of 12-0 and would now be sent to the Economic and Social Council.
- UN mediator Folke Bernadotte arrived on Rhodes to begin negotiations with Jewish and Arab delegations for a permanent peace settlement in Palestine.

== June 19, 1948 (Saturday) ==
- After a 19-hour overnight filibuster in the US Senate, the House passed a stop-gap bill for the induction of 21 months of military service for men aged 19 through 25.
- The Battle of Shangcai ended in Communist victory.
- The biographical film Fighting Father Dunne starring Pat O'Brien was released.
- Born: Nick Drake, singer-songwriter, in Rangoon, Burma (d. 1974); Lea Laven, pop singer, in Haukipudas, Finland; Phylicia Rashad, actress, in Houston, Texas

== June 20, 1948 (Sunday) ==
- US Congress completed a marathon 44 hour and 15 minute session passing a whirlwind of legislation, including a foreign aid bill appropriating over $6 billion for global relief. It was the second-longest Senate session in history, surpassed only by one in 1915 that lasted 54 hours 10 minutes.
- The first of the series of Cairo bombings occurred, killing 22 Jews.
- The new Deutsche Mark was introduced in Western Germany, replacing the Reichsmark.
- The TV variety program The Ed Sullivan Show premiered on CBS under its original title, Toast of the Town. The program would run until 1971, airing 1,068 episodes.
- The Naked and the Dead by Norman Mailer topped The New York Times Fiction Best Seller list for the first of eleven consecutive weeks.
- Born: Ludwig Scotty, President of Nauru, in Anabar, Nauru
- Died: Norah Lindsay, 75, Indian-born English socialite and garden designer

== June 21, 1948 (Monday) ==
- The Republican National Convention opened in Philadelphia. It was the first convention in US history to be televised.
- The Manchester Baby, the world's first electronic stored-program computer, ran its first program.
- Columbia Records held a press conference at the Waldorf Astoria New York to announce a new format of record - the LP, containing up to 22½ minutes of music per side.
- The Gathering Storm, the first volume in Winston Churchill's historical book series The Second World War, was published in the United States.
- The British troopship HMT Empire Windrush arrives at the Port of Tilbury, near London. The passengers on board include one of the first large groups of post-war West Indian immigrants to the United Kingdom,
- Born: Lionel Rose, boxer, in Drouin, Victoria, Australia (d. 2011); Philippe Sarde, film composer, in Hauts-de-Seine, France; Andrzej Sapkowski, fantasy author, in Łódź, Poland

== June 22, 1948 (Tuesday) ==
- Thomas E. Dewey entered a commanding position at the Republican National Convention when Pennsylvania Senator Edward Martin withdrew from consideration and threw his support to Dewey.
- The British drama film Oliver Twist based on the Charles Dickens novel of the same name and starring Alec Guinness, Robert Newton and John Howard Davies premiered at the Odeon Leicester Square in London.
- Born: Shōhaku Okumura, Sōtō Zen priest, in Osaka, Japan; Todd Rundgren, musician, songwriter and producer, in Upper Darby, Pennsylvania; Franciszek Smuda, footballer and coach, in Lubomia, Poland (d. 2024)

== June 23, 1948 (Wednesday) ==
- After having funded the project, the U.S. Department of Defense decided against imposing secrecy restrictions on the development of the transistor by Bell Laboratories. The date and its significance were noted 10 years later by Dr. J. P. Molnar, who said that the decision allowed rapid development of the electronics industry.
- The Republican National Convention unanimously adopted a party platform. Pledges included a reduction of public debt, promotion of small business, "eventual statehood for Hawaii, Alaska, and Puerto Rico," a foreign policy "which welcomes co-operation but spurns appeasement," and "a vigorous enforcement of existing laws against Communists."
- The British government called in soldiers to begin unloading food supplies tied up in the 10-day dockworker's strike.
- Born: Larry Coker, American football player and coach, in Okemah, Oklahoma; Clarence Thomas, Associate Justice of the Supreme Court of the United States, in Pin Point, Georgia

== June 24, 1948 (Thursday) ==
- The Berlin Blockade began. Russian authorities cut off electricity to Berlin's western zones and halted rail transport between western Germany and the city as well, claiming "technical difficulties." Britain retaliated by banning the shipment of Ruhr coal and steel to the Soviet occupation zone.
- Thomas E. Dewey was unanimously chosen Republican nominee for president on the third ballot at the National Convention. "I thank you with all my heart for your friendship and confidence," Dewey said in his acceptance speech. "I am profoundly sensible of the responsibility that goes with it. I accept your nomination. In all humility, I pray God that I may deserve this opportunity to serve our country."
- The Military Selective Service Act became effective in the United States.
- Born: Patrick Moraz, keyboardist and composer, in Morges, Switzerland

== June 25, 1948 (Friday) ==
- The Republican National Convention ended after Governor Earl Warren of California was named the party's vice presidential candidate.
- Folke Bernadotte reported to the UN Security Council that Egypt had acted contrary to the "letter and spirit" of the ceasefire by halting an unarmed Israeli food convoy.
- In China, the Hebei–Rehe–Chahar Campaign ended in Communist victory.
- Joe Louis retained the world heavyweight boxing title with an 11th-round knockout of Jersey Joe Walcott before a crowd of 42,667 at Yankee Stadium.
- Golda Meir was named Israel's representative to the Soviet Union.
- Died: William C. Lee, 53, American general and commander of the 101st Airborne Division during World War II

== June 26, 1948 (Saturday) ==
- The Berlin Airlift began with 32 flights by US C-47s in West Germany to the Tempelhof Airport in Berlin. 80 tons of provisions were delivered on the first day.
- Civil rights leader A. Philip Randolph called for a civil disobedience campaign to resist the new draft law until President Truman issued an executive order against segregation in the military.
- This week's issue of The New Yorker included the short story "The Lottery" by Shirley Jackson.
- Stanley Skridla, 28, was found dead in Oregon, Illinois. His murder is still unsolved.

== June 27, 1948 (Sunday) ==
- The Czech Social Democratic Party was absorbed into the Communist Party.
- Died: Lilian Velez, 24, Filipino actress and singer (murdered)

== June 28, 1948 (Monday) ==
- The Fukui earthquake killed over 3,700 people in Fukui Prefecture, Japan.
- King George VI proclaimed a state of emergency throughout the United Kingdom as the London dock strike threatened to spread to other ports. Prime Minister Clement Attlee gave a radio address telling the strikers, "This is not a strike against capitalists or employers. It is a strike against your mates; a strike against the housewife; a strike against the common people who have difficulties enough."
- Folke Bernadotte submitted proposals to both sides in the Arab-Israeli conflict that he hoped would "lay a basis for a solution of the Palestine question."
- Tito–Stalin Split: A Cominform Resolution accused the Communist Party of Yugoslavia of departing from communism by "undertaking an entirely wrong policy on the principal question of foreign and internal politics." Following the resolution, the Party was expelled from Cominform and the Informbiro period began in Yugoslavia.
- Columbia Records released the very first LP, a recording of the Mendelssohn Violin Concerto by Nathan Milstein and the New York Philharmonic.
- Ronald Reagan got a divorce from his first wife, Jane Wyman.
- Lotte Group, a confectionery and global conglomerate in South Korea and Japan was founded.
- Born: Kathy Bates, actress, in Memphis, Tennessee; Deborah Moggach, novelist and screenwriter, in England

== June 29, 1948 (Tuesday) ==
- The Central Committee of Yugoslavia's Communist Party defied the Cominform by issuing a point-by-point refutation of the Cominform's charges and making it clear that Yugoslavia would not be dictated to by the Soviet Union and other Cominform powers and would only discuss the dispute in a "basis of equality."
- London dock workers voted to end their 16-day strike and go back to work rather than face the government's threat to invoke its broad emergency powers.
- The body of Mary Jane Reed, 17, was found in Oregon, Illinois. Her murder is still unsolved.
- Born: Leo Burke, professional wrestler, born Leonce Cormier in Dorchester, New Brunswick, Canada (d. 2024); Fred Grandy, actor and politician, in Sioux City, Iowa; Ian Paice, rock drummer (Deep Purple), in Nottingham, England.

== June 30, 1948 (Wednesday) ==
- A federal court in Boston sentenced Robert Henry Best to life in prison for broadcasting Nazi propaganda during the war.
- A Bulgarian Junkers Ju 52 flying from Varna to Sofia with 17 passengers aboard was hijacked by seven anti-Communists who killed the pilot and radio operator, then flew the plane to Istanbul where they sought political asylum.
- The last British soldiers left Palestine through the port of Haifa.
- Bob Lemon of the Cleveland Indians pitched a 2-0 no-hitter against the Detroit Tigers at Briggs Stadium.
- The musical film Easter Parade starring Judy Garland and Fred Astaire had its world premiere in New York.
- The film Oliver Twist starring Alec Guinness and based on the Charles Dickens novel of the same name premiered in London.
- Born: Raymond Leo Burke, Roman Catholic cardinal prelate, in Richland Center, Wisconsin; Vladimir Yakunin, businessman, in Melenki, Vladimir Oblast, USSR
- Died: Omobono Tenni, 42, Italian motorcycle road racer (killed in an accident during practice)
