= March 1948 =

Month of 1949

<<	March 1948					>>
Su	Mo	Tu	We	Th	Fr	Sa
	1	2	3	4	5	6
7	8	9	10	11	12	13
14	15	16	17	18	19	20
21	22	23	24	25	26	27
28	29	30	31

The following events occurred in March 1948:

== March 1, 1948 (Monday) ==
- US Lieutenant General John R. Hodge announced that general elections would be held in Korea under UN supervision on May 9. The elections would be observed "in such parts of Korea as are accessible to the commission."
- The Costa Rican Congress annulled as fraudulent the election of February 8 in which Otilio Ulate Blanco was elected president.

== March 2, 1948 (Tuesday) ==
- 1948 Heathrow Disaster: A Douglas DC-3 of the Belgian airline Sabena crashed at Heathrow Airport, London, killing 20 of the 22 aboard.
- By a vote of 18-8, the US House Judiciary Committee approved an anti-lynching bill over protests from Southern Democrats.
- Born: Rory Gallagher, blues rock musician, in Ballyshannon, Ireland (d. 1995); Jeff Kennett, politician and media commentator, in Melbourne, Australia
- Died: Abraham Brill, 73, Austrian-born American psychiatrist

== March 3, 1948 (Wednesday) ==
- A Stern Gang car bombing in Haifa killed 11 Arabs.
- Juraj Slávik and František Němec, the Czechoslovak ambassadors to the United States and Canada respectively, resigned their posts in protest of the Communist coup in Czechoslovakia. "I cannot accept as legal the government nominated by President Beneš under duress and terror," Slávik explained at a press conference, further declaring that he would "fight for a free Czechoslovakia."

== March 4, 1948 (Thursday) ==
- In London, exiled former king Michael of Romania commented in public for the first time since abdicating the throne. In front of a gathering of reporters he read a statement explaining that his abdication "was imposed on me by force by a government installed and maintained in power by a foreign country, a government utterly unrepresentative of the will of the Romanian people ... The removal of the monarchy constitutes a new act of violence in the policy for the enslavement of Romania. In these conditions I do not consider myself bound in any way by this act imposed upon me."
- NACA pilot Herb Hoover became the first civilian to break the sound barrier, flying the X-1-2 aircraft.
- The film noir The Naked City starring Barry Fitzgerald was released.
- Born: Brian Cummings, voice actor, in Sioux Falls, South Dakota; James Ellroy, crime fiction writer and essayist, in Los Angeles, California; Tom Grieve, baseball player and broadcaster, in Pittsfield, Massachusetts; Leron Lee, baseball player, in Bakersfield, California; Chris Squire, bass player and founding member of the rock band Yes, in Kingsbury, London, England (d. 2015); Shakin' Stevens, rock musician, as Michael Barrett in Cardiff, Wales
- Died: Antonin Artaud, 51, French playwright, actor and director

== March 5, 1948 (Friday) ==
- New records for US rocket missiles were established when a Navy rocket reached a speed of 3,000 miles per hour (4,800 km/h) and an altitude of 78 miles (126 km) during tests at White Sands, New Mexico.
- Born: Eddy Grant, musician, in Plaisance, British Guiana; Elaine Paige, singer and actress, in Barnet, Hertfordshire, England

== March 6, 1948 (Saturday) ==
- The US Atomic Energy Commission announced a $3 million program to encourage research into the use of radioactive materials for treating cancer. Radioisotopes would be provided for free to qualified medical and research workers.
- Born: Anna Maria Horsford, actress, in New York City
- Died: Ross Lockridge Jr., 33, American novelist (suicide)

== March 7, 1948 (Sunday) ==
- The Linfen Campaign began during the Chinese Civil War.
- Legislative elections were held in Argentina, won by the Peronist Party with 64.1% of the vote.
- In accordance with the terms of the Treaty of Peace with Italy, the Dodecanese Islands were returned to Greece for the first time since 1522.

== March 8, 1948 (Monday) ==
- The United States Supreme Court decided McCollum v. Board of Education, a landmark ruling regarding the separation of church and state with respect to education.
- The National Film School in Łódź was established in Poland.
- Born: Gyles Brandreth, British broadcaster and former politician in Wuppertal, West Germany
- Died: Hulusi Behçet, 59, Turkish dermatologist and scientist

== March 9, 1948 (Tuesday) ==
- The Republican presidential primaries began in New Hampshire, with Thomas E. Dewey winning six of the state's eight delegates.
- Hockey players Billy Taylor of the New York Rangers and Don Gallinger of the Boston Bruins were banned for life from the NHL for gambling.
- Born: Eric Fischl, artist, in New York City; László Lovász, mathematician, in Budapest, Hungary; Jeffrey Osborne, musician, in Providence, Rhode Island

== March 10, 1948 (Wednesday) ==
- The RuSHA trial ended at Nuremberg with thirteen of the fourteen defendants found guilty of at least one charge.
- Hitoshi Ashida became Prime Minister of Japan.
- Died: Zelda Fitzgerald, 47, American socialite, novelist and wife of F. Scott Fitzgerald (died in a hospital fire); Jan Masaryk, 61, Czech diplomat and politician (officially said to be suicide but widely believed to have been murdered)

== March 11, 1948 (Thursday) ==
- The Zhoucun–Zhangdian Campaign began during the Chinese Civil War.
- A bombing of the Jewish Agency's headquarters in Jerusalem killed 12 Jews.
- American movie producers agreed to end a boycott of the British market that had been in place since August because of a 75 percent ad valorem tax imposed upon imported films. Britain promised to eliminate the tax in exchange for American producers agreeing not to withdraw from Britain any profits above $17 million.
- Born: Dominique Sanda, actress and model, in Paris, France

== March 12, 1948 (Friday) ==
- The Costa Rican Civil War began.
- Northwest Airlines Flight 4422, a C-54 charter plane flying from Shanghai to the United States, crashed into Alaska's Mount Sanford, killing all 30 aboard.
- Chile formally accused the Soviet Union of threatening world peace and demanded that the UN Security Council investigate what role Moscow had in the Czechoslovak coup.
- Born: James Taylor, singer-songwriter, in Boston, Massachusetts; Virginia Bottomley, British Conservative Party politician and member of the House of Lords

== March 13, 1948 (Saturday) ==
- Governors of the Southern United States met in Washington and signed a pledge to oppose President Truman's re-election bid. While not mentioning Truman by name, the document affirmed that "we go on record as repudiating the present leadership of the Democratic party in opposing the so-called civil rights program," and recommended "to the people of the Southern States that they fight to the last ditch to prevent the nomination of any candidate for President or Vice President who advocates such invasions of State sovereignty as those proposed in the said program." The signers of the document were Governors Fielding L. Wright of Mississippi, Beauford H. Jester of Texas, Jim Folsom of Alabama, Melvin E. Thompson of Georgia, Strom Thurmond of South Carolina, Ben Laney of Arkansas and Senator Harry F. Byrd on behalf of Virginia Governor William M. Tuck.
- A state funeral was held in Prague for Jan Masaryk. Prime Minister Klement Gottwald used his eulogy to blame the Western press for making a concerted effort to drive Masaryk to suicide by hurting his feelings.
- In the Chinese Civil War, the Siping Campaign ended in Communist victory.
- "Mañana (Is Soon Enough for Me)" by Peggy Lee hit #1 on the Billboard singles charts.

== March 14, 1948 (Sunday) ==
- The Israel Broadcasting Authority made its first broadcast as an independent station.
- A referendum on the sugar industry was held in Switzerland. 63.8% of voters rejected a proposal to reorganize the Swiss sugar industry.
- Born: Billy Crystal, actor, filmmaker and comedian, in New York City
- Died: Anabheri Prabhakar Rao, 37, Indian revolutionary and guerrilla leader (killed in battle)

== March 15, 1948 (Monday) ==
- British Prime Minister Clement Attlee told Parliament that known or suspected Communists or Fascists in the Civil Service would be dismissed from posts vital to national security.
- The Winter Offensive of 1947 in Northeast China ended in Communist victory.
- Born: Sérgio Vieira de Mello, diplomat, in Rio de Janeiro, Brazil (d. 2003)

== March 16, 1948 (Tuesday) ==
- Some 100,000 members of the CIO United Packinghouse Workers went on strike throughout the United States for a wage increase of 29 cents an hour.
- The drama film The Miracle of the Bells starring Fred MacMurray, Alida Valli, Frank Sinatra and Lee J. Cobb premiered in New York City.

== March 17, 1948 (Wednesday) ==
- Belgium, France, Luxembourg, the Netherlands and the United Kingdom signed the Treaty of Brussels, providing for mutual defence as well as economic, social and cultural collaboration.
- President Truman addressed a special joint session of Congress in which he called for swift passage of the Marshall Plan as well as a temporary peacetime draft.
- The United States of Matsya formed.
- The Hells Angels motorcycle gang was founded in California.
- Born: William Gibson, speculative fiction writer and essayist, in Conway, South Carolina
- Died: Sidney Nowell Rostron, 64, Church of England priest, theologian and academic

== March 18, 1948 (Thursday) ==
- Bulgaria and the Soviet Union signed a twenty-year treaty of friendship, co-operation and mutual military defense.
- Born: Guy Lapointe, ice hockey player, in Montreal, Quebec, Canada
- Died: Jakob Weis, 68, German priest and prison chaplain

== March 19, 1948 (Friday) ==
- Vladimír Clementis was named Czechoslovakia's new Foreign Minister to succeed the late Jan Masaryk.
- Born: Ricky Lee, screenwriter, journalist, novelist and playwright, in Daet, Camarines Norte, Philippines

== March 20, 1948 (Saturday) ==
- The United States, Great Britain and France announced that they had proposed to the Soviet Union and to Italy that the Free Territory of Trieste be returned to Italian sovereignty.
- The 20th Academy Awards were held at the Shrine Auditorium in Los Angeles. Gentleman's Agreement won three Oscars including Best Picture.
- Sheila's Cottage won the Grand National horse race.
- General elections were held for the first time in Singapore, with three of the six contested seats going to the Progressive Party.
- Born: John de Lancie, actor, filmmaker and musician, in Philadelphia, Pennsylvania; Bobby Orr, ice hockey player, in Parry Sound, Ontario; Helene Vannari, actress, in Kilingi-Nõmme, Estonia (d. 2022)

== March 21, 1948 (Sunday) ==
- Moscow radio responded to the US-British-French proposal to return the Free Territory of Trieste by accusing the three powers of "acting behind the back of the Soviet Union" to revise the Italian peace treaty.
- The Zhoucun–Zhangdian Campaign ended in Communist victory.
- A car bombing in Haifa killed 20 Jews.

== March 22, 1948 (Monday) ==
- The Civil War in Mandatory Palestine had one of its worst days when Jews blew up two areas in the Arab quarter of Haifa, killing 17 and wounding at least 150. Arabs responded with mortar shelling of the Jewish business quarter, killing a constable when four bombs fell on a British police station. 60 more were killed at Hartuv when British troops shelled Arab positions in the hills with 25-pound guns.
- A group of civil rights leaders including A. Philip Randolph met with President Truman about integrating the US military. "In my recent travels around the country I found Negroes not wanting to shoulder a gun to fight for democracy abroad unless they get democracy at home," Randolph told reporters after the meeting. "The President was disturbed by that statement. More than that, he was strongly moved. It was most unwelcome news to him, as it was to me."
- Born: Wolf Blitzer, journalist and television news anchor, in Augsburg, Germany; Inri Cristo, spiritual leader, as Álvaro Theiss in Indaial, Brazil; Andrew Lloyd Webber, musical theatre composer, in Kensington, London, England

== March 23, 1948 (Tuesday) ==
- The two most representative bodies of Palestinian Jews, the Jewish Agency for Palestine and the Jewish National Council, agreed to establish a Jewish provisional government on May 16, the day after the expiration of the British mandate over Palestine.
- British pilot John Cunningham set a new flight altitude record of 18,119 meters (59,445.5 feet) in a modified de Havilland Vampire fighter jet.
- University of Kentucky won its 1st NCAA Basketball Championship when U.K. defeated Baylor 58-42 in the NCAA Men's Division I Basketball Tournament Final at Madison Square Garden.
- Died: Kōzō Satō, 76, Japanese admiral

== March 24, 1948 (Wednesday) ==
- A State District Court in Washington sentenced Gerhart Eisler to one-to-three years imprisonment for concealing his Communist ties when applying for a permit to leave the United States in 1945.
- Died: Nikolai Berdyaev, 74, Russian philosopher; Paolo Thaon di Revel, 88, Italian admiral and politician

== March 25, 1948 (Thursday) ==
- Italy rejected a proposal from Yugoslavia's Marshal Tito to swap Trieste for Gorizia.
- President Truman announced the American trusteeship proposal for Palestine.
- The comedy film Mr. Blandings Builds His Dream House had its world premiere at the Astor Theatre in New York City.
- Born: Bonnie Bedelia, actress, in New York City

== March 26, 1948 (Friday) ==
- President Truman issued a proclamation that starting on April 15, the export of aircraft, radar and other potential war materiel would require a license from the National Munitions Control Board.
- Franklin D. Roosevelt Jr. and Elliott Roosevelt, sons of the late 32nd President, issued statements urging a Democratic draft of Dwight D. Eisenhower. "Circumstance requires a man who will convince the Russian leaders that the constant aim of our policy is to secure the lasting peace for which World War II was fought and who, at the same time, will take all necessary steps to stop further aggression, direct or indirect, by the U.S.S.R. against the free peoples of the world," the statement by Roosevelt Jr. read. "The American people have such a man in Gen. Dwight D. Eisenhower. I am mindful of the General's earlier statement on this matter, but since the Communist coup in Czechoslovakia we have entered a period as critical as that after Munich. The American people have a right to call the General back into active public service."
- Construction of the controversial Truman Balcony of the White House was reported complete.
- Born: Nash the Slash, musician, as James Plewman in Toronto, Canada (d. 2014); Steven Tyler, lead singer of the rock band Aerosmith, as Steven Tallarico in New York City; Gayyur Yunus, Azerbaijani painter, in Baku, Azerbaijan

== March 27, 1948 (Saturday) ==
- The Yehiam convoy, a Haganah convoy from Haifa, was attacked and destroyed by an Arab ambush.
- On Corregidor, 15 Philippine soldiers and six civilian workers were killed when an old Japanese booby trap exploded in a tunnel.
- King Farouk of Egypt laid down the foundation stone of the Aswan Dam.
- Cambridge won the 94th Boat Race in a record time of 17 minutes 50 seconds.
- Female suffrage is legally enacted in Belgium.

== March 28, 1948 (Sunday) ==
- Parliamentary elections were held in Romania with the People's Democratic Front claiming 93.22% of the vote.
- The 2nd Tony Awards were held at the Waldorf-Astoria Hotel in New York City. The Tony Award for Best Play was given out for the first time, won by Mister Roberts.
- Born: Jayne Ann Krentz, author, as Jayne Castle in Cobb, California; Dianne Wiest, actress, in Kansas City, Missouri
- Died: Hamdi al-Pachachi, 61 or 62, Iraqi politician

== March 29, 1948 (Monday) ==
- US Army Information Chief Floyd L. Parks said that "under no conceivable circumstances" would Dwight D. Eisenhower accept a Democratic draft, explaining that his close friend's announcement refusing to accept a presidential nomination "applies to Democrats as well as to Republicans."
- Occupation authorities in Japan prohibited a looming general strike of 400,000 communications workers.
- The song "Nature Boy" by jazz singer Nat King Cole was released on Capitol Records.
- Born: Bud Cort, actor and comedian, in New Rochelle, New York

== March 30, 1948 (Tuesday) ==
- The Soviets began restricting ground traffic to western Berlin by announcing plans to inspect all motor vehicles and trains moving between Berlin and western Germany in order to hunt for spies and "illegal" shipments of machinery to the West.
- The Committee on Control of the UN Atomic Energy Commission adjourned indefinitely due to an impasse between the Soviet Union and the western powers over how to set up the organizational structure of the proposed International Atomic Agency.
- The three-day Pocono Conference on quantum mechanics opened at the Pocono Manor in the Pocono Mountains of Pennsylvania.
- Born: Eddie Jordan, motorsport team boss, businessman and television personality, in Dublin, Ireland

== March 31, 1948 (Wednesday) ==
- The second of the two Cairo–Haifa train bombings were carried out by the Jewish militant group Lehi, killing 40 civilians, mostly Arabs.
- Born: Al Gore, environmentalist and 45th Vice President of the United States, in Washington, D.C.; Rhea Perlman, actress, on Coney Island, New York
- Died: Egon Kisch, 62, Austrian and Czechoslovak writer and journalist
