= April 1948 =

Month of 1948

| << | April 1948 | | | | | >> |
| Su | Mo | Tu | We | Th | Fr | Sa |
| | | | | 1 | 2 | 3 |
| 4 | 5 | 6 | 7 | 8 | 9 | 10 |
| 11 | 12 | 13 | 14 | 15 | 16 | 17 |
| 18 | 19 | 20 | 21 | 22 | 23 | 24 |
| 25 | 26 | 27 | 28 | 29 | 30 |

The following events occurred in April 1948:

== April 1, 1948 (Thursday) ==
- The UK electricity industry was nationalized under the Electricity Act 1947.
- Born: Peter Law, Welsh politician and independent member of parliament, in Monmouthshire, Wales (d. 2006)

== April 2, 1948 (Friday) ==
- US President Harry S. Truman vetoed a $4.8 billion tax reduction bill arguing that it would cause a federal deficit and increase inflation, but Congress overturned the veto just four hours later in one of Truman's worst legislative defeats.
- The Jean-Paul Sartre play Dirty Hands was first performed at the Theatre Antoine in Paris.
- Born: Roald Als, cartoonist, in Frederiksberg, Denmark
- Died: Sabahattin Ali, 41, Turkish writer and journalist (killed at the Bulgarian border); Sawan Singh, 89, Indian Saint known as "The Great Master"

== April 3, 1948 (Saturday) ==
- President Truman signed the Foreign Assistance Act of 1948, making the Marshall Plan an actuality.
- The Jeju Uprising began in Korea.
- Born: Carlos Salinas de Gortari, economist and 53rd President of Mexico, in Mexico City

== April 4, 1948 (Sunday) ==
- The Battle of Mishmar HaEmek began when Arab forces commanded by Fawzi al-Qawuqji launched an attack on the kibbutz of Mishmar HaEmek.
- The TV talk show Author Meets the Critics first aired on NBC. In each episode, two critics would debate a recently published book and then be joined by the author.
- The Ides of March by Thornton Wilder topped The New York Times Fiction Best Seller list.
- Born: Berry Oakley, bassist of The Allman Brothers Band, in Chicago, Illinois (d. 1972); Squire Parsons, gospel singer and songwriter, in Newton, West Virginia (d. 2025); Dan Simmons, author, in Peoria, Illinois

== April 5, 1948 (Monday) ==
- The Gatow air disaster occurred when a British European Airways airliner crashed near RAF Gatow air base in southwest Berlin after a mid-air collision with a Soviet Yakovlev Yak-3 fighter plane.
- The Queensland railway strike ended in Australia.
- WGN-TV went on the air, operating from the Tribune Tower in Chicago.
- Died: Abby Aldrich Rockefeller, 73, American socialite and philanthropist

== April 6, 1948 (Tuesday) ==
- Finland and the Soviet Union signed a ten-year military pact that would obligate Finland to resist an armed attack made against Russia by Germany, but allowing Soviet troops to enter Finland "only in case of necessity and only on such terms as may be agreed on between the two countries."
- On Budget Day in the United Kingdom, Chancellor of the Exchequer Sir Stafford Cripps submitted a budget showing estimated revenue of £3.754 billion against an expenditure of £2.976 billion, with a projected surplus of £330 million once all government expenditures were taken into account. The budget added a graduated tax on investment income and raised taxes on alcohol and gambling, but increased tax allowances on earned income.
- A Czech Airlines commercial plane en route from Prague to Bratislava was hijacked and flown to the US-controlled zone of Germany near Munich. Three of the crew and most of the 26 passengers aboard were in on the plot and were seeking political asylum. All but five passengers and one crew member told the American authorities that they wanted to stay in Germany rather than go back to Czechoslovakia.
- The US Golf Association barred Babe Zaharias from playing in the US Open by amending its rules to restrict applicants to men. "As the championship has always been intended to be for men, the eligibility rules have been rephrased to confirm that condition," a communication from the USGA explained.

== April 7, 1948 (Wednesday) ==
- The World Health Organization was established.
- Born: John Oates, guitarist, singer, songwriter and half of the rock duo Hall & Oates, in Philadelphia, Pennsylvania
- Died: Isabel Andreu de Aguilar, 60, Puerto Rican writer and suffragist

== April 8, 1948 (Thursday) ==
- The Burmese government announced the start of full-scale military operations against guerrillas in Communist-held parts of the country.
- Died: Abd al-Qadir al-Husayni, 40 or 41, Palestinian military leader (killed in the Palestine War)

== April 9, 1948 (Friday) ==
- The Deir Yassin massacre took place when around 120 fighters from Zionist military groups attacked the Palestinian Arab village of Deir Yassin, killing at least 107 Palestinians.
- Bogotazo: Massive riots took place in Bogotá, Colombia after the assassination of presidential candidate Jorge Eliécer Gaitán.
- Died: George Carpenter, 75, 5th General of The Salvation Army; Jorge Eliécer Gaitán, 45, Colombian politician (assassinated)

== April 10, 1948 (Saturday) ==
- The Einsatzgruppen trial ended in Nuremberg. 14 of the 24 defendants were sentenced to death; the others received prison sentences of varying lengths.
- Burma's application for membership in the United Nations was approved, but the Soviet Union vetoed Italy's application for the third time.

== April 11, 1948 (Sunday) ==
- Claude Harmon won the Masters Tournament.
- Died: Jock Sutherland, 59, American football player and coach

== April 12, 1948 (Monday) ==
- US Secretary of Defense James Forrestal told a Senate committee that Russia knew how to make an atomic bomb, but thus far lacked the industrial capacity for their manufacture. When members of the committee asked him when Russia might attain this capacity, Forrestal replied that he did not know.
- On the third anniversary of the death of Franklin D. Roosevelt, a 10-foot high memorial statue sculpted by William Reid Dick was unveiled in London's Grosvenor Square by his widow Eleanor Roosevelt. King George VI gave a speech praising the 32nd President as "a great man of peace and a great citizen of the world."
- Born: Jeremy Beadle, television and radio presenter, in Hackney, London, England (d. 2008); Joschka Fischer, politician, in Gerabronn, Germany; Marcello Lippi, footballer and manager, in Viareggio, Italy

== April 13, 1948 (Tuesday) ==
- The Hadassah medical convoy massacre took place when a convoy bringing medical and military supplies and personnel to Hadassah Hospital on Mount Scopus was ambushed by Arab forces, killing 79.
- The 1948 Constitution of Romania was ratified.
- A ceasefire went into effect in the Costa Rican Civil War as an end to the month-old conflict was reported to be imminent.
- Born: Mikhail Shufutinsky, pop singer, in Moscow, USSR

== April 14, 1948 (Wednesday) ==
- By a vote of 245-222, the British House of Commons approved a five-year moratorium on capital punishment.
- The Toronto Maple Leafs defeated the Detroit Red Wings 7-2 to win their second straight Stanley Cup in a four-game sweep.

== April 15, 1948 (Thursday) ==
- Pan Am Flight 1-10: A Pan American World Airways Lockheed Constellation passenger plane flying from London to Shannon Airport in Ireland crashed 725 meters short of the runway, killing 30 of the 31 aboard.
- The ten-day Battle of Mishmar HaEmek ended in a successful Jewish counteroffensive that captured several Arab villages.
- Born: Michael Kamen, composer, in New York City (d. 2003)
- Died: Manuel Roxas, 56, 5th President of the Philippines

== April 16, 1948 (Friday) ==
- José Arce of Argentina was elected President of the United Nations General Assembly by a vote of 31-18.
- Born: Ammar El Sherei, musician, in Samalut, Egypt (d. 2012); Kazuyuki Sogabe, voice actor and musician, in Chiba Prefecture, Japan (d. 2006)

== April 17, 1948 (Saturday) ==
- Fighting resumed in the Costa Rican Civil War after a four-day truce, although peace talks continued.
- Elpidio Quirino became the 6th President of the Philippines the day after Manuel Roxas died in office.
- A controversy began in Britain when the Daily Herald published a telegram apparently signed by thirty-seven Labour Party MPs wishing success to Pietro Nenni, an Italian socialist politician whose party was in an alliance with the Communists for the upcoming election. When reached for comment, fifteen of the MPs in question would either say that they did not sign the telegram, claim that they only did so through a misunderstanding, or withdraw their support.
- Born: Jan Hammer, musician and record producer, in Prague, Czecheslovakia; Peter Jenni, experimental particle physicist, in Arzier-Le Muids, Switzerland
- Died: Kantarō Suzuki, 80, Japanese admiral and 42nd Prime Minister of Japan

== April 18, 1948 (Sunday) ==
- General elections were held in Italy. The Christian Democracy party won a plurality of seats by a comfortable margin.

== April 19, 1948 (Monday) ==
- Burma was formally admitted as the 58th member of the United Nations.
- A copper mine explosion in Catapalca, Peru killed 41 miners.
- Gérard Côté won the Boston Marathon for the fourth time.

== April 20, 1948 (Tuesday) ==
- The election for the 1st-term President and Vice-President of the Republic of China was held, with Chiang Kai-shek claiming over 90% of the vote.
- A Munich denazification court convicted Fritz Julius Kuhn in absentia as a Nazi offender and sentenced him to 10 years in a labor camp and confiscation of property.
- Labor union leader Walter Reuther survived an assassination attempt when a shotgun blast was fired through the kitchen window of his Detroit home, with one slug entering his right arm and a second in his right chest cavity. Reuther was rushed to hospital where he received a blood transfusion.
- Roy Campanella made his major league debut with the Brooklyn Dodgers, becoming the first African-American catcher since the breaking of the color line. He entered the game in the seventh inning against the New York Giants and was hit by the pitch in his only plate appearance.
- Died: Mitsumasa Yonai, 68, Japanese admiral and 37th Prime Minister of Japan

== April 21, 1948 (Wednesday) ==
- The Battle of Haifa began as Haganah forces launched an attack on the Arab neighborhoods of Haifa.
- The United Nations Security Council adopted Resolution 47 on the Kashmir conflict, recommending a three-step process for the resolution of the dispute.
- British European Airways Flight S200P, a Vickers 610 Viking 1B airliner, crashed in North Ayrshire, Scotland. All 20 on board survived.
- In Washington, Justice Thomas Alan Goldsborough issued a preliminary 80-day antistrike injunction against United Mine Workers under the Taft-Hartley Act.
- The Baltimore Bullets defeated the Philadelphia Warriors 88-73 to win the Basketball Association of America Finals, four games to two.
- Born: Josef Flammer, ophthalmologist, in Bronschhofen, St. Gallen, Switzerland

== April 22, 1948 (Thursday) ==
- The Battle of Haifa ended in Haganah victory.
- The Palmach launched Operation Yevusi to assert Jewish control over Jerusalem.
- The Boeing strike of 1948 began when 15,000 Boeing Union members went on strike.
- The controversial "Nenni Telegram" dogged the Labour Government in the House of Commons, with Herbert Morrison and Winston Churchill sparring over the question of whether the matter was an internal problem for the Labour Party or one that concerned the entire House.

== April 23, 1948 (Friday) ==
- The UN Security Council voted 8-0 to set up a three-power commission consisting of Belgium, France and the United States to supervise the implementation of a truce in Palestine.
- Czechoslovakia and Bulgaria signed a 20-year mutual defense pact.
- Born: Charles R. Johnson, scholar and author, in Evanston, Illinois

== April 24, 1948 (Saturday) ==
- The Costa Rican Civil War ended in victory for the National Liberation Army. Approximately 2,000 people are believed to have died in the 44-day conflict.
- A mob of 1,500 Koreans rioted in Kobe, Japan in protest against the closing of Korean schools.
- Manchester United defeated Blackpool 4-2 in the FA Cup Final at Wembley Stadium.
- Born: Gregory S. Martin, US Air Force general, in Fort Myer, Virginia
- Died: Manuel Ponce, 65, Mexican composer

== April 25, 1948 (Sunday) ==
- Former Egyptian Prime Minister Mostafa El-Nahas survived an assassination attempt when three men dressed in police uniforms blew up a car packed with explosives at his home and escaped in a second car. El-Nahas was not hurt although his wife was injured slightly by flying glass.
- Raintree County by Ross Lockridge Jr. topped The New York Times Fiction Best Seller list.

== April 26, 1948 (Monday) ==
- King George VI and Queen Elizabeth celebrated their silver wedding anniversary with a service at St Paul's Cathedral followed by a 22-mile motor procession around London.
- The United States Air Force announced a policy of racial integration, the first of the armed services to do so.

== April 27, 1948 (Tuesday) ==
- Haganah announced that it had entered a pact with the Irgun to co-ordinate future operations.
- Born: Si Robertson, television personality (Duck Dynasty), in Vivian, Louisiana
- Died: William S. Knudsen, 69, American automotive industry executive and World War II general

== April 28, 1948 (Wednesday) ==
- Arab and Jewish representatives agreed in the UN Trusteeship Council to observe a truce in the Old City part of Jerusalem.
- The Palmach began Operation Yiftach with the goal of capturing Safed and secure the eastern Galilee before the British Mandate ended on May 14.
- Czechoslovakia's Constituent Assembly passed six nationalization bills that left only about 8% of the country's trade and industry in private hands.
- John Platts-Mills was expelled from the UK Labour Party for being the primary organizer of the Nenni Telegram.
- The drama romance film Letter from an Unknown Woman starring Joan Fontaine and Louis Jordan premiered in New York City.
- Born: Terry Pratchett, fantasy novelist and author of the Discworld book series, in Beaconsfield, Buckinghamshire, England (d. 2015); Marcia Strassman, actress and singer, in New York City (d. 2014)

== April 29, 1948 (Thursday) ==
- A Polish court in Gdańsk sentenced Nazi Gauleiter Albert Forster to death for crimes against humanity.

== April 30, 1948 (Friday) ==
- The Charter of the Organization of American States was signed at the Ninth International Conference of American States in Bogotá, Colombia.
- The musical film The Emperor Waltz directed by Billy Wilder and starring Bing Crosby and Joan Fontaine had its world premiere in London.
- Died: Wilhelm Ritter von Thoma, 56, German general (heart attack)
