= May 1948 =

Month of 1948

<<	May 1948					>>
Su	Mo	Tu	We	Th	Fr	Sa
						1
2	3	4	5	6	7	8
9	10	11	12	13	14	15
16	17	18	19	20	21	22
23	24	25	26	27	28	29
30	31

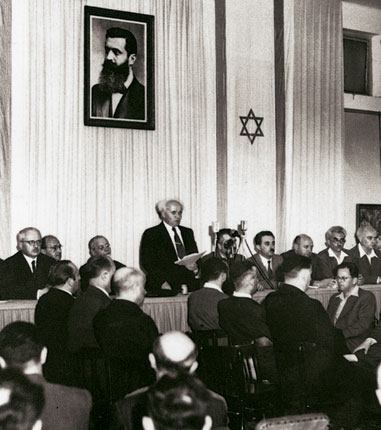
May 14: Prime Minister David Ben-Gurion Declares The State of Israel's Independence, Becoming The world's first and only Jewish Country.

The following events occurred in May 1948:

== May 1, 1948 (Saturday) ==
- The Korean People's Committee in the Soviet-controlled northern zone of Korea announced the establishment of a "People's Republic", claiming jurisdiction over all of Korea and adopting a Soviet-style constitution. US Lieutenant General John R. Hodge, commander of the southern zone of Korea, immediately issued a message indicating that he did not recognize the People's Committee as a legitimate government and did not intend to negotiate with it.
- The Ein al-Zeitun massacre occurred at the Palestinian Arab village of Ein al-Zeitun when the Palmach destroyed the village and killed between 23 and 70 Arab prisoners.
- Greek Justice Minister Christos Ladas was assassinated in Athens by a man who hurled a grenade from a car window. The assassin, who was shot and captured by police, was identified as a member of the Organization for the Protection of the People's Struggle (OPLA), a Communist-affiliated paramilitary group.
- Pope Pius XII promulgated Auspicia quaedam, an encyclical on worldwide public prayers for peace and a solution to the Palestine problem.
- Citation won the Kentucky Derby.
- Wigan defeated Bradford Northern 8–3 in rugby's Challenge Cup Final at Wembley Stadium. It was the first rugby match ever televised.

== May 2, 1948 (Sunday) ==
- Dwight D. Eisenhower formally retired from the US Army in a ceremony at Fort Myer, Virginia.
- Born: Larry Gatlin, country and gospel singer and songwriter, in Seminole, Texas
- Died: Wilhelm von Opel, 76, co-founder of the German automobile manufacturer Opel

== May 3, 1948 (Monday) ==
- In Jerusalem, Operation Yevusi ended incomplete due to the ceasefire imposed by the British Army.
- Colombia broke off diplomatic relations with the Soviet Union. The rupture had been anticipated since Colombian President Mariano Ospina Pérez had blamed international communism for the Bogotazo.
- The U.S. Supreme Court decided United States v. Paramount Pictures, Inc., ruling that the existing movie distribution scheme was in violation of antitrust laws, as well as Shelley v. Kraemer, which struck down racially restrictive housing covenants.
- The 31st Pulitzer Prizes were awarded. Recipients included Tennessee Williams receiving the Pulitzer Prize for Drama for A Streetcar Named Desire, James A. Michener in Fiction for Tales of the South Pacific, Walter Piston in Music for Symphony No. 3 and the St. Louis Post-Dispatch in the Public Service category for its coverage of the Centralia mine disaster.
- Born: Denis Cosgrove, geographer, in Liverpool, England (d. 2008); Chris Mulkey, actor, in Viroqua, Wisconsin; Peter Oosterhuis, golfer and golf analyst, in Lambeth, London, England
- Died: Howard C. Lilly, 31-32, NACA research pilot (plane crash); Ernst Tandefelt, 62, Finnish nobleman and assassin of Interior Minister Heikki Ritavuori in 1922

== May 4, 1948 (Tuesday) ==
- A firing squad outside Athens executed 24 leftists accused of murders during the Dekemvriana in December 1944.
- The drama film Hamlet starring Laurence Olivier based on the William Shakespeare play was released.
- Born: George Tupou V, King of Tonga, in Tongatapu, Tonga (d. 2012)

== May 5, 1948 (Wednesday) ==
- Soviet-licensed press in Berlin published new postal regulations prohibiting the mailing of food, liquor and precious metals from Berlin to western Germany.
- Born: Joe Esposito, singer-songwriter, in the United States; Bill Ward, drummer and founding member of the heavy metal band Black Sabbath, in Aston, Birmingham, England

== May 6, 1948 (Thursday) ==
- Four-power talks in London on an Austrian peace treaty were adjourned indefinitely after delegates reached an impasse over Yugoslavia's claim for territory in Carinthia and Styria in addition to reparations.
- The novel The Naked and the Dead by Norman Mailer was published.

== May 7, 1948 (Friday) ==
- The Hague Congress met in the Congress of Europe in The Hague, bringing together about 600 delegates representing a broad political spectrum. Winston Churchill delivered a speech appealing to Europeans to forget "the hatreds of the past" and create a united Europe centered on "the idea of a Charter of Human Rights, guarded by freedom and sustained by law."
- The United States, Britain and France told the UN Atomic Energy Commission to abandon its efforts to devise an international control plan, blaming the Soviet Union for the impasse.

== May 8, 1948 (Saturday) ==
- Haganah forces launched Operation Maccabi to drive out the Arab forces and Palestinian irregulars occupying the road to Jerusalem. Over the next eight days the Givati and Harel Brigades would capture the villages of Bayt Mahsir, Abu Shusha, Al-Na'ani, al-Qubab and Dayr Ayyub.
- José Figueres Ferrer became 32nd President of Costa Rica.
- Born: Stephen Stohn, American-born Canadian lawyer and television producer, in Denver, Colorado
- Died: U Saw, 47 or 48, Prime Minister of British Burma (executed by hanging for his role in the assassination of Aung San)

== May 9, 1948 (Sunday) ==
- The Ninth-of-May Constitution came into effect in Czechoslovakia.
- The Haganah launched Operation Barak with the goal of capturing villages north of Gaza in anticipation of the arrival of the Egyptian Army.
- Born: Steven W. Mosher, social scientist and activist, in Scotia, California; Calvin Murphy, basketball player, in Norwalk, Connecticut
- Died: Viola Allen, 80, American stage actress

== May 10, 1948 (Monday) ==
- Constituent Assembly elections were held in the US-occupied southern zone of Korea with supervision from the United Nations. The National Association for the Rapid Realisation of Korean Independence achieved a plurality by winning 55 of 200 seats.
- US President Harry S. Truman thwarted an imminent nationwide railroad strike by issuing an executive order taking over the country's railroads and directing the Secretary of the Army to operate them in the name of the US government. "It is essential to the public health and to the public welfare generally that every possible step be taken by the Government to assure to the fullest possible extent continuous and uninterrupted transportation service," Truman explained in a statement. "A strike on our railroads would be a nationwide tragedy, with worldwide repercussions."
- The Golani Brigade of the Haganah launched Operation Gideon with the objective of capturing Beisan, clearing the surrounding area and blocking one of the possible entry routes for Transjordanian forces.

== May 11, 1948 (Tuesday) ==
- Luigi Einaudi was elected President of Italy in a joint session of parliament.
- Third-party presidential candidate Henry A. Wallace gave a speech before 19,000 people at Madison Square Garden that was also broadcast over radio and television. Wallace used the speech to publicize an open letter to Joseph Stalin featuring a six-point plan to end the Cold War: A general reduction of armaments, stopping all foreign exports of weapons, unrestricted trade between the two countries, freedom of movement between the two countries, free exchange of scientific information and the establishment of an UN agency for international relief.
- Born: Shigeru Izumiya, poet, folk singer and actor, in Aomori, Japan

== May 12, 1948 (Wednesday) ==
- 1948 Sabena DC-4 Crash: A Douglas DC-4 of the Belgian airline Sabena crashed near Libenge, Congo, killing 31 of the 32 aboard.
- Queen Wilhelmina of the Netherlands announced that she would be abdicating the throne in favor of her daughter Juliana in September after the celebration of her Golden Jubilee.
- The Hebei–Rehe–Chahar Campaign began during the Chinese Civil War.
- The thriller film The Iron Curtain starring Dana Andrews and Gene Tierney was released.
- Born: Lindsay Crouse, actress, in New York City; Steve Winwood, musician, in Handsworth, West Midlands, England

== May 13, 1948 (Thursday) ==
- Jewish forces in Jerusalem launched Operations Shfifon and Kilshon.
- The Kfar Etzion massacre took place after a two-day battle in which Jewish Kibbutz residents and Haganah militia defended Kfar Etzion from Arab forces. 129 Jews were killed and the kibbutz was looted and razed to the ground.
- Born : Daniel Russo, French actor
- Died: Kathleen Cavendish, Marchioness of Hartington, 28, American socialite (plane crash)

== May 14, 1948 (Friday) ==
- The Israeli Declaration of Independence was proclaimed, announcing that the State of Israel would come into effect upon termination of the British Mandate for Palestine the following day.
- Eleven minutes after Israel declared independence, President Truman issued a memo that concisely read: "This Government has been informed that a Jewish state has been proclaimed in Palestine, and recognition has been requested by the provisional government thereof. The United States recognizes the provisional government as the de facto authority of the new State of Israel."
- The RAND Corporation was formed.
- FC Dinamo Bucharest was founded in Romania.
- Born: Bob Woolmer, cricketer and coach, in Kanpur, India (d. 2007)

== May 15, 1948 (Saturday) ==
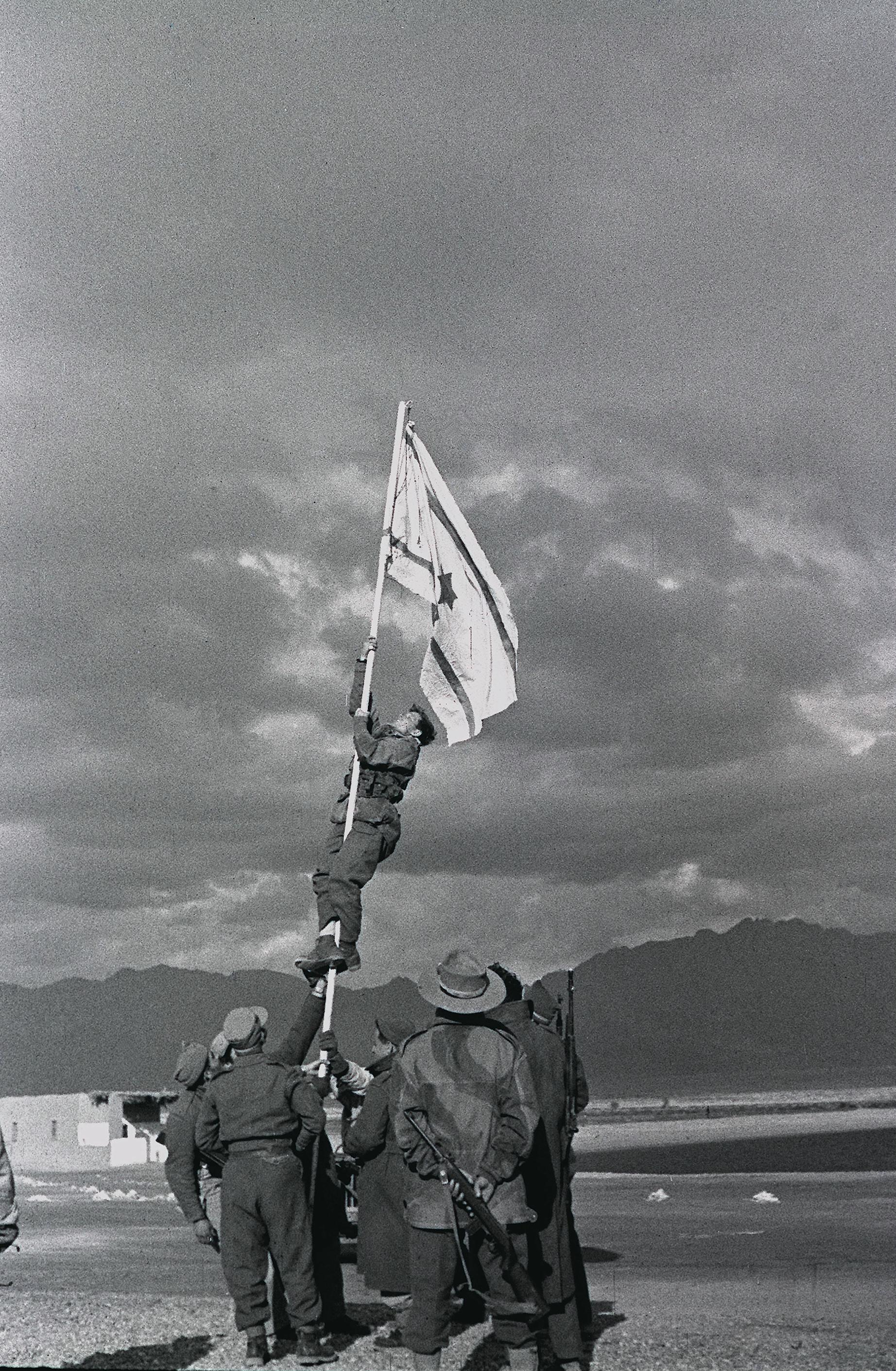
Outbreak of The Arab-Israeli War of 1948.

- The British mandate in Palestine expired at midnight. The Arab–Israeli War began as a coalition of Arab states attacked under the overall command of King Abdullah of Transjordan. The Battle of Nirim was fought, with Egyptian forces failing to take the kibbutz of Nirim, and the Battles of the Kinarot Valley began.
- The murder of June Anne Devaney occurred when a 3-year 11-month-old girl was abducted from her cot at Queen's Park Hospital in Blackburn, Lancashire, raped, and murdered. Her killer would eventually be arrested, convicted and hanged following the first mass fingerprinting exercise to solve a murder in UK history.
- Australian cricket team in England in 1948: In a game against Essex, the touring Australian cricket team broke the record for the most runs scored in a first-class match in a day by scoring 721 runs.
- Citation won the Preakness Stakes.
- "Nature Boy" by Nat King Cole hit #1 on the Billboard singles charts.
- Born: Yutaka Enatsu, baseball player, in Nara Prefecture, Japan; Brian Eno, musician and record producer, in Woodbridge, Suffolk, England
- Died: Edward J. Flanagan, 61, Irish-born American Catholic priest and founder of the Boys Town orphanage

== May 16, 1948 (Sunday) ==
- The 37-member Israeli State Council met for the first time and elected Chaim Weizmann provisional president, while Israel applied for membership in the United Nations.
- Born: Jesper Christensen, actor, in Copenhagen, Denmark

== May 17, 1948 (Monday) ==
- The Dewey–Stassen debate became the first audio-recorded presidential debate to ever take place in the United States.
- Moscow radio read a message from Joseph Stalin replying to Henry Wallace's open letter, welcoming it as a good basis "for peaceful settlement of the differences between the USSR and the United States."
- The Soviet Union diplomatically recognized Israel.
- At the United Nations, US Ambassador Warren Austin presented a resolution to the Security Council ordering Jews and Arabs to observe a truce in Palestine within 36 hours.

== May 18, 1948 (Tuesday) ==
- By a 4–4 tie, the US Supreme Court refused to review the cases of 74 Germans for a massacre of unarmed American prisoners during the Battle of the Bulge. The four judges who opposed reviewing the case argued that the court had no jurisdiction over decisions of the international tribunal.
- The Linfen Campaign ended in Communist victory.
- Aquila Airways was founded.
- Born: Mikko Heiniö, composer and musicologist, in Tampere, Finland

== May 19, 1948 (Wednesday) ==
- US Secretary of State George Marshall said during a press conference that Stalin's sincerity in promoting understanding between Russia and the United States would be demonstrated by showing co-operation on outstanding world issues before the United Nations and other international agencies. Henry A. Wallace fired back in a speech that night, calling Marshall's answer "not satisfactory. It is an answer calculated to continue the cold war, when we need peace."
- The Battle of Yad Mordechai began in the Arab-Israeli War.
- By a vote of 319-58 the US House of Representatives passed the Mundt-Nixon Communist Control Bill, which proposed regulating Communist organizations as well as providing stiff jail terms and fines for subversive activities.
- Another instance of Czech nationals defecting by plane occurred when eight former members of the Czech Air Force landed at Manston RAF Station in Kent, England in a "borrowed" plane.
- The Making of an Insurgent, an autobiography of Fiorello H. La Guardia covering the early years of his life, was posthumously published.
- Born: Grace Jones, musician, model and actress, in Spanish Town, Jamaica
- Died: Maximilian Lenz, 87, Austrian artist

== May 20, 1948 (Thursday) ==
- The al-Kabri incident occurred when the Arab town of al-Kabri was captured by the Israeli army in retaliation for the ambush of the Yehiam convoy and almost immediately depopulated.
- Count Folke Bernadotte was unanimously selected as the United Nations mediator for the Palestine conflict.
- Born: Tesshō Genda, actor and voice actor, in Okayama Prefecture, Japan
- Died: George Beurling, 26, Canadian World War II fighter pilot (transport plane crash)

== May 21, 1948 (Friday) ==
- The Battles of the Kinarot Valley ended in a tactical stalemate but were perceived as a decisive Israeli victory.
- Brazil and Great Britain signed a trade agreement worth more than $400 million US.
- The 67-day-old strike of CIO United Packinghouse Workers was called off against every major meat-packing company except one after the workers accepted the raise of 9 cents an hour which had been offered to them at the beginning of the strike.
- Speaking before a congress of the International College of Surgeons in Rome, Pope Pius XII condemned sterilization, birth control and childbirth operations to save the mother's life at the expense of the child.
- Born: Elizabeth Buchan, author, in Guildford, England; Jonathan Hyde, actor, in Brisbane, Australia; Leo Sayer, singer and songwriter, in Shoreham-by-Sea, England

== May 22, 1948 (Saturday) ==
- By a vote of 8–0, the United Nations Security Council ordered a ceasefire in Palestine within 36 hours from midnight, New York time.
- Swedish President Juho Kusti Paasikivi dismissed Yrjö Leino as Interior Minister three days after Swedish Parliament passed a vote of censure on Leino, ostensibly for handing over ten Finnish subjects and ten stateless persons over to the Soviets in 1945. Leino had refrained from resigning his post even though he was constitutionally required to do so.
- Died: Georgios Tsolakoglou, 62, Greek military officer and Prime Minister of the Greek collaborationist government during World War II

== May 23, 1948 (Sunday) ==
- In a pastoral letter read in Hungarian Catholic churches, Primate József Mindszenty condemned the proposed nationalization of the country's schools.
- The Siege of Changchun began during the Chinese Civil War.
- Operation Yiftach ended.

== May 24, 1948 (Monday) ==
- The Battle of Yad Mordechai ended in a successful Israeli delaying action.
- The Battles of Latrun began during the Arab–Israeli War.
- The Soviet Union vetoed a UN resolution to establish a Security Council subcommittee to hear Czech refugees testify on the Czechoslovak coup d'état.
- Died: Jacques Feyder, 62, Belgian actor and filmmaker

== May 25, 1948 (Tuesday) ==
- General Motors averted a strike of its auto workers by agreeing to raise the wages of 225,000 employees by 11 cents an hour in a contract tying pay raises to increases in the cost of living, the first provision of its kind in the auto industry.
- The United Church of Christ in the Philippines (UCCP) was founded at Ellinwood Malate Church in Manila.
- Ben Hogan won the PGA Championship.
- Born: Klaus Meine, lead singer of the rock band Scorpions, in Hanover, Germany
- Died: Witold Pilecki, 47, Polish resistance leader, executed in Mokotów Prison, Warsaw

== May 26, 1948 (Wednesday) ==
- The Arab League rejected the UN's appeal for a ceasefire and gave the Council 48 hours to submit a proposal for a settlement of the entire Palestine problem.
- A parliamentary election was held in South Africa. The Reunited National Party led by Daniel François Malan ended the fourteen-year reign of incumbent Prime Minister Jan Smuts' United Party.
- The comedy-drama film The Time of Your Life starring James Cagney premiered in New York City.
- Born: Dayle Haddon, model and actress, in Montreal, Canada (d. 2024); Stevie Nicks, singer-songwriter and member of Fleetwood Mac, in Phoenix, Arizona

== May 27, 1948 (Thursday) ==
- A general election was held in Panama, in which Domingo Díaz Arosemena was controversially elected president.
- US President Harry S. Truman ordered an investigation of the Voice of America program after congressmen complained about several things that had been said about US states during the broadcasts. The controversy was over a Spanish-language program produced by NBC and broadcast to Latin America called "Know North America". In one case, the narrator described Nevada as "a land of cowboys, and its two principal cities are in competition. In Las Vegas people get married and in Reno they get divorced." Of Wyoming it was said that "the important thing isn't the people, but the cattle," while a profile of Texas included the remark, "an American writer has made the statement New England was founded by hypocrisy and Texas by sin." NBC said that the script writer had been fired.
- The Walt Disney film Melody Time was released.

== May 28, 1948 (Friday) ==
- The 1948 Litang earthquake occurred near Litang, China, causing more than 800 deaths.
- Following his defeat at the polls, 78-year old Jan Smuts resigned as Prime Minister of South Africa and retired rather than lead the Opposition.
- Chrysler workers in the United States ended a 17-day strike after accepting a wage increase of 13 cents an hour.
- Died: Unity Mitford, 33, British socialite and fascist (meningitis caused by the cerebral swelling around a bullet from a self-inflicted gunshot wound in 1939)

== May 29, 1948 (Saturday) ==
- The United Nations Security Council called for a four-week ceasefire in Palestine and threatened to apply sanctions if the parties did not comply within 72 hours.
- The Yanzhou Campaign began during the Chinese Civil War.
- An explosion of camphor oil aboard a train in Taiwan killed over 60 people, about 40 of whom burned to death although others drowned jumping from the train into a river below.
- Israeli forces commenced Operation Pleshet, aimed at capturing Isdud and stopping the northward Egyptian advance.
- A referendum was held in Australia on a proposed alteration to the Australian Constitution to increase the power of the Commonwealth to make laws with respect to rents and prices. 59.34% rejected the proposal.
- Henry A. Wallace appeared before a Senate Judiciary subcommittee to testify against the Mundt-Nixon Communist control bill, blasting its sponsors as "warmongers, fearmongers and hatemongers" who would stand in history as "American counterparts of Mussolini and Hitler." Wallace maintained that existing laws were adequate to deal with acts of subversion and swore that his third party would refuse to comply with the measure if it passed.
- Oklahoma! closed on Broadway after a record 2,202 performances.
- Born: Michael Berkeley, composer and broadcaster, in London, England
- Died: May Whitty, 82, English stage and film actress

== May 30, 1948 (Sunday) ==
- Parliamentary elections were held in Czechoslovakia. The National Front fielded the only candidates on the ballot and claimed 89.2% of the vote.
- Pope Pius XII made a radio address appealing to the Hungarian people to continue opposing the anti-clerical measures of their Communist government.
- The town of Vanport, Oregon was permanently destroyed when a section of the dike holding back the Columbia River collapsed during a flood, killing 15.
- Died: József Klekl, 73, Slovene Catholic priest and political activist

== May 31, 1948 (Monday) ==
- The Korean National Assembly convened in Seoul for the first time and elected Syngman Rhee as its chairman.
- At a conference in London, representatives of the United States, Great Britain, France, Belgium, the Netherlands and Luxembourg reached an agreement on setting up a west German state early in 1949.
- Mauri Rose won the Indianapolis 500 for the second straight year.
- Born: Svetlana Alexievich, journalist and writer, in Stanislav, Ukrainian SSR; John Bonham, drummer of the rock band Led Zeppelin, in Redditch, Worcestershire, England (d. 1980); Joseph A. Stirt, anesthesiologist and author, in Milwaukee, Wisconsin, United States.
