= Disappearance of Virginia Carpenter =

1948 American missing person case

Virginia Carpenter
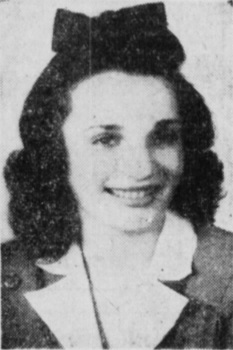
- Born: January 25, 1927; Texarkana, Texas, U.S.
- Disappeared: June 1, 1948 (aged 21); Denton, Texas U.S.
- Status: Missing for 77 years, 10 months and 12 days
- Height: 5 ft 3 in (1.60 m)
- Parents: Hazel E. Carpenter (mother); Floyd Carpenter (father)
- Relatives: Rudolph D. Carpenter (uncle); E.C. Dodd (uncle)

Mary Virginia "Jimmie" Carpenter was a 21-year-old American missing person from Texarkana, Texas, who went missing in Denton in the summer of 1948. Carpenter was last seen by a taxi driver around 9:30 p.m. on Tuesday, June 1, 1948. Numerous individuals have reported seeing her over the years, but none of these sightings have been confirmed. Her mother, Mrs. Hazel E. Carpenter (later Mrs. Hazel Smith), spent many years helping police chase down rumors and leads. She eventually gave up hope, believing that her daughter was dead, although she still wanted her body to be found. In 1998, Denton police received an anonymous tip that Carpenter was buried at the campus she was supposed to attend, but it turned out fruitless. Countless man-hours and almost a quarter of a million dollars were spent on the investigation. The case is unsolved, but remains open.

Speculation of Carpenter's disappearance was that the serial killer responsible for the Texarkana Moonlight Murders had murdered her, since she knew three of the victims. The girl's mother convinced herself that Carpenter was a victim of amnesia, not knowing who she was or where she was from, which prompted her to give the girl's life story for the second anniversary of her disappearance in the Denton Record-Chronicle; although the year before, she was convinced that her daughter was dead. Bones were found around Denton County in 1949, 1958 and 1960, but they were declared to not be Miss Carpenter. In 1985, Lewis C. Rigler, a Texas Ranger who was a lead investigator in the case, said that he was not surprised that what may have been the most famous missing person case in Texas was still drawing attention.

== Early life ==
Mary Carpenter was born January 25, 1927, in Texarkana. She was a healthy baby, mostly feeding from Holstein milk which was suggested by her maternal grandfather who eventually gave the family a Holstein cow. She began walking at a young age and as her mother put it, she "inherited a bad streak from me of wanting to walk a little too far from home". To keep her from doing so, Mrs. Carpenter would scare her daughter by telling her that big dogs roamed the streets.

When she was three, Miss Carpenter rolled down the back steps at her home and hit a tree. X-rays showed that she had no injuries. Three months afterward, she caught a bad case of flu and could not walk. Her parents diligently searched for a cause for her illness but medical science at the time could not diagnose her. She got better for a while but then a severe attack left her badly crippled. The family went through many orthopedic surgeons until one in Memphis, Tennessee, found an infection in her right hip bone. It left perforations in it similar to tiny pinholes. Virginia was placed in a contraption for a few months that pulled her leg back into proper position. Too young to understand, Carpenter was given internal medicine, a diet, and the task to sunbathe on the hospital's tar roof for two hours a day for two years. She was able to walk better with the use of a steel brace that fitted into the heel of her shoe which then came up to a leather-rolled "saddle" around her hip. Mrs. Carpenter admitted to making the mistake of placing Virginia in kindergarten while she was still in the brace. Virginia soon became self-conscious and lost weight due to a loss of appetite. She was taken out of school but returned a year later when the brace was removed. She was announced "completely cured" by a specialist when she was 12. She was one of only four complete case histories compiled for the American Medical Association.

Not long after going to Arkansas High School with her cousin, her father became seriously ill. He died two years later when she was 15. She did not excel academically, but was described by teachers as possessing an unusual amount of common sense and loyalty. She was a quiet girl and rarely participated in activities because she tired easily and had a limp in her right leg from her childhood disease. She joined the band and became a majorette. Because of her participation in activities, she joined a sorority after receiving a bid from each one. After graduating from Arkansas High in 1944, she went to the University of Arkansas to study journalism. After a year, she came home and told her mother that she wanted to go into laboratory technician training but it required something she did not take in high school (science). She went to TSCW from September 1945 until February 1946 when she had to quit and take care of her mother who became ill. She planned on finishing her schooling within a year.

After her mother became ill, she underwent major surgery. A week later, Virginia was struck with appendicitis and was also operated on. A month later, they were both taken home by an "Aggie" (a student from Texas A&M University) named Mac. Virginia fell in love with Mac, became engaged, and set a date for their wedding. Her grandparents did not approve of the engagement. Three weeks before their wedding date, Virginia broke it off. Virginia's mother said, "I loved Mac because of his fine qualities and because he was so good to me, but I couldn't see their two personalities living together in harmony." Virginia soon started working for a clinic. She wanted to be a nurse but knew that her right leg would not support the strenuous hours of being on her feet. She decided instead to be a technician. Mrs. Carpenter revealed that Virginia wanted to be a technician because medical science did not find a cure for her father. Virginia wanted to return to school but worried about finances. She then took a job at an insurance firm because it paid a better salary. She stayed with the firm until August 1947 when she had enough money to go back to school. She started the next month at Texarkana Junior College. She now had her future planned: she could go to TSCW in the summer which would enable her to attend the technician training in late 1948.

Ten days before school was out, Virginia went to the annual picnic from Texarkana Junior College at a lake near Daingerfield, Texas. She left with her date and another couple. About 5 p.m. that evening, Virginia came home and said she did not feel well. Mrs. Carpenter said her daughter "was one of the most sunburned persons I had ever seen." Virginia fell across her bed and went to sleep. Hazel woke her for supper but Virginia said she did not feel like eating. She came to the dinner table but fainted. She regained consciousness while her mother was taking her to the bathroom and then she fainted again and fell to the floor. Mrs. Carpenter did not think she would revive. She picked her up and put her in the bed before calling a doctor. While waiting for the doctor, Virginia regained consciousness and then fainted again, due to sunstroke. She was diagnosed with second-degree sunburn. He prescribed her with rest and quiet for a few days. After the third day, Virginia made an effort to take her final exams at school. While there, she told her teachers about her love affair that did not work out and that she fell in love again but the boy did not love her.

In the last few months before her disappearance, she took up sketching and became quite good through the coaching of a friend. Mrs. Carpenter said that a portrait Virginia did from memory of her father was one of the best likeness she had ever seen. Virginia was recovering from her sunburn when she packed for her trip to Denton. Mrs. Carpenter wanted to take Virginia to Denton in the car, but she insisted that she would be fine on the train. On June 1, the day of her disappearance, they ran to the station and caught the train moments before it left. "I was so in hopes we would find the train gone so that I could drive her down the next morning. There was a tinge of disappointment when I saw the train had not left, but she refused to get on until she kissed me goodbye; and as she stood on the rear platform of the train waving goodbye, I wondered if there was anyone more radiant and beautiful. In my heart I offered a silent prayer because she was mine."

An only child, Virginia Carpenter was 5 feet 3 inches (1.60 m) tall, weighed 120 pounds (54 kg), and had dark brown hair and brown eyes. She was last seen wearing a light white chambray dress with brown and green stripes (some descriptions include red stripes) and silver buttons down the front, a small white straw hat with the brim flipped up and a white feather stuck in the back, red leather platform high-heeled shoes, and a gold Wittnauer watch. Carpenter took with her a red purse, a black pasteboard hat box, and a brown steamer trunk with a matching cosmetics case. According to Mrs. Carpenter, her daughter left with no more than 15 or 20 dollars.

== Disappearance ==
On Tuesday, June 1, 1948, Carpenter went to Texarkana Union Station and boarded the Texas & Pacific Texas Special #31, which departed for Dallas at about 3 p.m. The train stopped in Denton around six hours later. She was on her way to the Texas State College for Women (TSCW) campus – now Texas Woman's University – to enroll in the summer course. While on the train, Carpenter met Marjorie Webster, a middle-aged school teacher who was also enrolling at TSCW from Texarkana.

After arriving in Denton, both women hired a taxi (driven by Edgar Ray "Jack" Zachary) to take them to the college dormitories. As Webster was being dropped off at the Fitzgerald dormitories, Carpenter realized that she forgot to check on her trunk at the Denton train station. She asked Zachary how much it would be to take her back to the station, to which he replied 75 cents. Webster asked if she needed to ride back with her, but Carpenter refused, stating, "No, I'll go alone. I'll be alright." After arriving again at the station, Carpenter went inside to get her trunk but came back a few minutes later claiming that she could not get it. She spoke to a railroad employee named Mr. Butrill, who told her the trunk would not arrive until later. Zachary told Carpenter to sign the back of her claim check and that he would pick it up and deliver it to her in the morning. Carpenter agreed and gave him her luggage receipt after writing "Virginia Carpenter, Room 200--Brackenridge", and a dollar for the extra trip.

Upon arriving back at Brackenridge Hall about 9:30 p.m., Zachary said he saw a yellow or cream-colored convertible parked in the front. There was no moon, and the street lights were out due to repair work on a cable. He reported that Carpenter walked up to the vehicle, which had two young men standing by it; one of whom was tall, the other short and stocky. She asked, "Well, what are y'all doing here?" He said it seemed as though she was surprised to see them. The shorter boy talked to her and lifted her on the curb. Carpenter told Zachary to place her luggage on the ground because the boys would get them for her and to leave her trunk there in the morning as well. After doing so, Zachary drove off but did not hear the rest of the conversation. That was the last anyone had seen Carpenter.

Reports claimed that a nightwatchman saw Carpenter get out of the cab and into the convertible. The next morning, Zachary dropped the trunk off and set it on the front lawn of Brackenridge Hall. After being there for two days, it was taken to the office. Mrs. Mattie Lloyd Wooten, the dean of women of TSCW, later explained to Mrs. Carpenter that it was the first time someone did not deliver luggage to the room.

== Investigation ==
Three days later on Friday, June 4, Carpenter's boyfriend, Kenny Branham of Dallas, called her mother in Texarkana because he could not get a hold of her. Mrs. Carpenter, now worried, called TSCW and found out that her daughter never enrolled. She then called friends and relatives that her daughter may have tried visiting, but they had not heard from her. On Saturday, June 5, around 12:30 a.m., she called the local authorities and the Denton police to report Carpenter missing. The Texarkana police told her to "just go to bed and we'll get on the case in the morning", but she could not sleep, so she and Mrs. Lucille Bailey, a friend who was living with her, left for Denton at 2:10 a.m. Late Saturday night, the girl's uncle and friends went to Denton to help assist the police in their search with any helpful information, but they failed to shed any light.

Airplanes began scanning the Denton area and motorboats were used to search ponds and lakes. Search parties searched the forest, as well as tanks, storm drains, creeks, country roads and abandoned wells. The search went statewide as police checked out drivers of light-colored convertibles in Texarkana and Denton, but came up with nothing. Lewis C. Rigler, a Texas Ranger, entered the investigation on Monday, June 7, by the request of Carpenter's uncle, Dr. E. C. Dodd, along with Chief of Police Jack Shepherd and Sheriff Roy Moore. Officers talked with groups and individuals as possible witnesses. Hunters and farmers were asked to be on the lookout for freshly dug dirt or any unusual odors. Pictures and a description of Carpenter were sent to various agencies, including the Department of Public Safety, major city police departments, protection officers of major railroad companies, and state investigative agencies. Carpenter's trunk was eventually opened, but it gave officers no clues. Her handbag was never found.

A reward fund for information leading to the arrest and conviction of the person or persons responsible started Wednesday, June 9, and by the end of Friday night, it had reached $1,368. Carpenter's picture and description was given to Reward magazine, the official publication of Tracers Company of America which investigates missing people with rewards. Despite having 150,000 police officials as subscribers, few replies came in about Carpenter and investigations came out inconclusive.

On Friday, July 9, Zachary took a polygraph test which concluded that he had no connection to her disappearance. Zachary's wife stated he had been home with her from 10:00 p.m. onwards on June 1, but ten years after Carpenter's disappearance, his wife told police she had lied to them, and her husband had not actually arrived home until 2:00 or 3:00 a.m. on June 2. Zachary died in 1984. He was never charged in connection with Carpenter's case, but he remains a suspect, although he passed two polygraphs in her case.

By Monday, July 12, it was rumored that Carpenter had returned home, but her mother confirmed that it was untrue. Shepherd said that Carpenter knew some boys with a cream-colored convertible, but was not able to implicate any of them with her disappearance. Many leads and tips were thoroughly checked but police were no further to finding Carpenter. More rumors had spread that she returned home or that her body or her luggage was found, but they were branded false by Shepherd. The reward money reached around $3,000, most of which was given back to the donors after two years of no helpful information. On June 9, 1955, seven years after her disappearance, Carpenter was considered officially dead under Article 55:41 in the Texas Civil Statute.

On October 18, 1959, a three-by-one wooden box was discovered, containing female bones including a skull, in a smokehouse near an abandoned farmhouse 7.5 miles northeast of Jefferson, Texas. The bones, which matched the height and weight description of Carpenter, were sent to Austin for examination. During that time, the previous owners of the farmhouse admitted to digging up the bones from a cemetery for African Americans. Mrs. Carpenter had hopes that it was her daughter's remains because the bones had a deformity in the right leg which made it shorter than the left, similar to Carpenter. Although the remains turned out to be from a white female with a shortened leg, the dental work did not match.

In May 1998, the police were tipped by a man in his 70s claiming that he knew who killed Carpenter and where she was buried. He stated she was buried on the grounds of the TSCW (now TWU) campus. The area was excavated, but only a leather glove, a rubber boot, and animal bone fragments were found.

== Reported sightings ==
Not long after Carpenter went missing, reports of sightings came in from Denton County, south Texas, Louisiana and Arkansas. None of the sightings, however, were confirmed. Two mornings after Carpenter's disappearance, a gas station attendant in Aubrey, Texas, located ten miles from Denton, saw a girl who resembled her. He reported his sighting on June 6 after seeing Carpenter's picture in that morning's newspaper. He said that a yellow convertible with Arkansas license plates occupied by two boys and two girls stopped at his station.

On Friday, June 11, around 9:00 p.m., a ticket agent named Mrs. James, working at a bus station in DeQueen, Arkansas, saw a girl who resembled Carpenter. The girl got off a bus from Texarkana wearing a red dress and carrying a red purse. She waited in the lobby before departing ten minutes later with a young man about 25- or 26- years old, weighing about 135 pounds, with light brown hair, and wearing a white shirt with khaki trousers. Mrs. James reported that before the girl met the boy, she seemed nervous by biting her lips a lot and going to the door frequently. She also inquired about local hotels. A few moments after their departure, Mrs. James received a phone call from a woman asking if "Miss Virginia Carpenter" was there. Mrs. James learned the next morning about Carpenter's disappearance and reported her sighting to the police. Bowie County Sheriff Bill Presley and FBI agent H. S. Hallett showed Mrs. James two groups of pictures in which she pointed out Carpenter as the girl she had seen. Police checked hotels and tourist camps but came up with nothing. Later, Mrs. James was uncertain of her identification of the girl.

On Saturday, June 12, a girl matching Carpenter's description was reported riding in a car with two boys in Mena, Arkansas (47 miles from DeQueen). A Michigan tourist in Tucson, Arizona, reported seeing a girl matching Carpenter's description on July 8 after seeing her reward poster in a local cafe. By July 12, Mrs. Carpenter said she had checked all leads in the case but was no closer to learning of her daughter's whereabouts.

On Friday, January 14, 1949, the Houston Press received a letter written in pencil, signed by Mrs. Gladys Bass from Chireno, Texas, who claimed that she and her friends met a girl who was well-dressed and well-educated who had been hitchhiking. The girl told them she was hungry and had no money. "She called herself Virginia. She talked properly, had long brown curly hair that touched her shoulders, and wore a white hat with a feather in it, a striped dress and blue sweater," she wrote. She said while they were eating at a cafe, the girl claimed to have run away. They all departed thinking that she was telling a story. It was not until later they believed that the girl was Carpenter, but the police were unable to substantiate Bass's report.

== Theories ==
Different theories have been proposed as the reason for Carpenter's disappearance. These have included running away, leaving with a lover, being kidnapped, being murdered, amnesia, or even being sold into forced prostitution. Psychiatrists and doctors who were consulted stated she had nothing to run away from but had rather enthusiastically looked forward to the future. It was also suggested that her body could have been weighed down and sunken in Lewisville Lake (then known as Lake Dallas), which was too large and too deep to be dragged. Carpenter knew three of the victims who were murdered by the "Phantom Killer" credited with the Texarkana Moonlight Murders, leading to speculation as to whether that case was linked to her disappearance.

Texas Ranger Lewis Rigler concluded Carpenter was dead because he believed there was no reason for her to disappear. He said she did not owe anyone any money, she had no criminal past, no jealous ex-boyfriends, no lovers convincing her to run away, and according to a medical exam before her disappearance, she was not pregnant.

== See also ==
- List of people who disappeared
