= Battle of Shangcai =

1948 battle

- Part of the Chinese Civil War
Date	June 17, 1948 – June 19, 1948
Location	Henan, China
Result	Communist victory

Belligerents
Flag of the National Revolutionary Army National Revolutionary Army	PLA People's Liberation Army

Commanders and leaders
Hu Lien	Song Shi-Lun

Strength
20,000	12,000

Casualties and losses
5,000	several thousand

Battle of Shangcai was a series of clashes fought between the nationalists and the communists during Chinese Civil War in the post World War II era, and resulted in the communist victory. The battle is also called the Blockade at Shangcai (Chinese: 上蔡阻击战) by the communists, who launched the battle to support their Eastern Hennan Campaign, with intention to prevent the nationalist force from reinforcing their comrades fighting the Eastern Hennan Campaign.

== Prelude ==
During the first half of the Chinese Civil War, communists lacked the necessary weaponry to destroy large formations of nationalist troops who were stationed in fortifications, so they must be lured out of the fortifications and engaged in the open field where communists would have a chance, and one of such occasion rose in June 1948. On June 15, 1948, communists had decided to launch Eastern Hennan Campaign to attack Kaifeng, thus forcing the nationalists to reinforce the defense of the city via redeployment. Communists planned to take the opportunity to destroy the nationalist reinforcement force while it was on the move.

== Order of battle ==
Nationalists Order of battle:

- Army-sized 11th Reorganized Division commanded by Hu Lien
  - 3 division-sized brigades

Communists Order of battle:

- 10th Column commanded by Song Shilun 宋时轮
  - 28th Division
  - 29th Division commanded by Xiao Feng 肖锋 political commissar Li Mancun 李曼村
    - Brigade-sized 85th Regiment
    - Brigade-sized 86th Regiment
    - Brigade-sized 87th Regiment

== Strategies ==
Communist strategy

- The nationalist 11th Reorganized Division was already on its northern march toward Kaifeng, to prevent it from reinforcing nationalist force defending the city, the communist commander Song Shilun (宋时轮) decided to attack Shangcai (上蔡), where the nationalist 11th Reorganized Division set up its headquarters, thus forcing the nationalist division to return to save its own headquarters.

Nationalist strategy

- Hu Lien (胡琏), the nationalist commander of the 11th Reorganized Division was well aware the communist strategy and adjust his plan accordingly. Giving up the mission to reinforce Kaifeng, Hu Lien (胡琏) ordered all of his force to turn back, and planned to use his headquarters as a bait to attract the enemy, while his main force would attack the enemy from the other side, destroying the enemy in a two fronts assault. Though this move would mean that he had to give up the rescue of the city exactly as his enemy had hoped, it was a good price to pay in exchange of totally destroying the enemy's 10th Column.

== Battle ==
In the morning of June 16, 1948, Song Shilun (宋时轮)’s 10th Column at Leave County (Yexian, 叶县) and Dancing Sun (Wuyang, 舞阳) in western Henan received order to reach north of Shangcai (上蔡) and be ready for the incoming battle no later than 9:00 AM next morning. When the 28th and the 29th Divisions of the communist 10th Column were ready to move out, it was already 2:00 pm on June 16, 1948. To travel to their destination in 17 hours at 90 km away, many communist troops were forced to sleep while on the move. To ensure the timely arrival and preparation, the communist commander himself and his chief-of-staff Gong Zuoyao (工作尧) traveled with the 29th Division, and the communist troops reached their destination on time.

The communists begun their attack on the town of Shangcai (上蔡) after taking a short break, with the three regiments of the 29th Division shouldered the main responsibility of attacking the nationalist headquarters: the 85th Regiment attacked the regions of Single Hamlet (Dan Zhuang, 单庄) and Little Village (Xiao Ji, 小集) to the north of the town after taking regions including Wheat Store (Mairen Dian, 麦仁店), and Plum Hamlet (Li Zhuang, 李庄), the 86th Regiment attacked and took the regions Western Flood Bridge (Xi Hong Qiao, 西洪桥), Liu Bridge (Liu Qiao, 刘桥), Kudzu Hamlet (Ge Zhuang, 葛庄), Sloped Zhao Village (Bo Zhao Cun, 坡赵村), of the 87th Regiment attacked and took the regions of Dong Hamlet (Dong Zhuang, 董庄), and Juan Liu (圈刘). By the night of June 17, 1948, all of the dispatched units of the nationalist 11th Reorganized Division had turned back to rescue the headquarters at Shangcai (上蔡), and much heavier fighting was expected by both sides.

The only way to return to Shangcai (上蔡) was via the narrow strip of land beginning at the Eastern Flood Bridge (Dong Hong Qiao, 东洪桥) in the east and ended at the Wheat Store (Mairen Dian, 麦仁店) in the west. The local rugged terrain, however, was ill-suited for the highly mechanized nationalist force, and this was exploited by the communists to the maximum. At 8:00 am on June 18, 1948, the nationalist 11th Reorganized Division launched its all out attack on the communists but the progress was painfully slow due to the unfavorable terrain. After eight hours of continuous fighting, the nationalist offensive stopped and both sides rested and prepared for the next round of fighting. By 10:00 PM, the communists withdrew to the second line of the defense by redeploying their 28th Division to the regions of Fan Hamlet (Fan Zhuang, 樊庄), Luo Pavilion (Luo Ge, 罗阁), Jiang Hamlet (Jiang Zhuang, 蒋庄), Xiao Slope (Xiao Po, 肖坡), and their 29th Division to the regions of King's Pavilion (Wang Ge, 王阁), Xiadi Pass (Xia Di Guan, 下地关), Hundred Feet Village (Bai Chi Ji, 百尺集), and Thunder Hamlet (Lei Zhuang, 雷庄).

Fierce fighting resumed and continued to the next day. After suffering five thousand casualties and realizing the rugged terrain had severely limited the effectiveness of the superior firepower, the nationalist commander refused to be drawn into a war of attrition anymore in a terrain favoring the enemy and decided to call it a quit. Since turning back to reinforce Kaifeng was too late to do, the nationalists withdrew southward, abandoning the hope of annihilating the communist 10th Column. The communists, in the meantime, successfully achieving their original objective of preventing the nationalists from reinforce Kaifeng did not pursuit and ended the battle.

== See also ==
- Outline of the Chinese Civil War
- National Revolutionary Army
- History of the People's Liberation Army
