= Zhoucun–Zhangdian Campaign =

1948 military campaign

Zhoucun-Zhangdian Campaign
- Part of the Chinese Civil War
Date	March 11, 1948 – March 21, 1948
Location	Shandong, China
Result	Communist victory

Belligerents
Flag of the National Revolutionary Army National Revolutionary Army	PLA Chinese Red Army

Commanders and leaders
unknown	Xu Shiyou; Tan Zhenlin

Strength
40,000	45,000

Casualties and losses
38,000	Unknown

The Zhoucun–Zhangdian Campaign (周张战役), short for the Campaign of Zhou's Village (Zhou Cun, 周村) and Zhang's Hotel (Zhang Dian, 张店), consisted of two major battles and a series of smaller battles that followed, fought between the Communists and the Nationalists in Shandong during the Chinese Civil War in the post–World War II era. The outcome was a Communist victory. This campaign is also called the Campaign at the Western Section of the Qingdao–Jinan Railway (胶济路西段战役).

== Prelude ==
In the beginning of 1948, the Nationalists in Shandong were forced to adopt a new defensive posture to strengthen the defense of the Tianjin-Pukou Railway. In February, 1948, the Nationalist Reorganized 12th Division guarding the western section of the Qingdao–Jinan Railway was redeployed to Yanzhou (兖州), and its original task was reassigned to the Nationalist Reorganized 32nd Division and other Nationalist units. The Communists decided to deploy their 13th Column to threaten the Nationalists in Qingdao so that they could not reinforce Nationalists elsewhere, and to concentrate units from their 7th Column, 9th Column, Bohai Column, and units from the Communist central Shandong and Bohai military districts to launch an offensive in the regions of Zhou's Village and Zhang's Hotel to dislodge the Nationalists.

== Order of battle ==
Defenders: Nationalist order of battle:

- Army-sized Reorganized 12th Division
- Army-sized Reorganized 32nd Division
- Other units

Attackers: Communist order of battle:

- Units from the 7th Column
- Units from the 9th Column
- Units from the Bohai Column
- Units from the Bohai Military District
- Units from the central Shandong Military District

== Campaign ==
Units of the Communist 7th Column and 9th Column secretly marched westward from Ye (掖) County, and by March 8, 1948, they had regrouped in Guangrao (广饶). On March 11, 1948, under the cover of heavy rain, the Communist 7th Column suddenly besieged the town of Zhang's Hotel before dawn. As the defenders attempted to break out westward, they fell into the trap set up by the waiting enemy and the entire Nationalist garrison was annihilated. The next morning, the Nationalists abandoned their positions outside the town of Zhou's Village, but were caught up by the approaching Communist 9th Column, who immediately launched a surprise attack on the retreating Nationalists. Taking advantage of the chaos, the Communists successfully penetrated into the town, and after an eighteen-hour-long fierce street fight, most of the Nationalist Reorganized 32nd Division was destroyed, with over 15,000 casualties, and the town fell. The consecutive losses of two major battles completely demoralized the rest of the local Nationalist garrisons, who abandoned their positions around the two towns in a domino effect. Capitalizing on this advantage, the Communist 7th Column took Zichuan and Zouping (邹平), annihilating the Nationalist garrisons and their reinforcements in the process. Meanwhile, the Communist Bohai Column and units from the Communist central Shandong and Bohai Military Districts (Communist bases) also badly mauled their Nationalist opponents in a series of smaller battles that followed, and the campaign concluded on March 21, 1948, by which time the Communists had successfully linked up two previously separated and isolated bases.

== Outcome ==
The Nationalists lost over 38,000 troops in this defeat, and the important Qingdao–Jinan railway transportation and communication line was severed. Additionally, fourteen cities and towns had fallen into Communist hands, and the Communists were able to combine their two separate bases in central Shandong and the coastal region into a single larger one.

== See also ==
- Outline of the Chinese Civil War
- National Revolutionary Army
- History of the People's Liberation Army
