= 1948 Boeing strike =

1948 industrial dispute and work stoppage

The 1948 Boeing strike was an industrial dispute which lasted 20 weeks, from April 22 to September 13.

== Background ==
The Boeing Company was founded by William Edward Boeing in 1916, with the name Pacific Aero Products. In 1945 president of the company Philip G. Johnson died and William McPherson Allen took his place. In 1945, after World War II, the market for wartime planes dwindled. The president William McPherson Allen decided to temporarily shut down the activities and to lay off 25,000 workers. To save the company, Allen announced that he was going to start making commercial planes.

In October 1946, Boeing declared that the contract between the company and the Union was up for renewal. Boeing and the Union reached an agreement to start negotiating the new contract starting January 1947. Between January and April 1947 both parties met regularly three times a week to discuss the contract. During this time neither party was able to reach an agreement. In April the Union gave Secretary of Labor and to the National Labor Relations Board a notice for intention to strike. After the intention was submitted the Union and Boeing tried to talk about the contract but “there remained unsettled questions of Seniority, Hours of Labor, and Wages.” After filing to strike and receiving approval the members of the Union never did so. The Union then drafted a proposal that discussed the issues the employees were worried about which was seniority, hours of labor, and wages. The condition was that the proposal had to be accepted by Boeing on April 21, 1948, before noon otherwise the proposal would be void. If this happened Lodge 751 stated that they “reserve the right to take appropriate action including a work stoppage.” Boeing rejected the offer on April 21, 1948. The next day the Union went on strike.

== Strike timeline ==
- 1938: “Aeronautical Industrial District Lodge No. 751 was certified by the Board as the bargaining agent of the production and maintenance employees.”
- May 13, 1947: Taft-Harley Labour Act passed. The Act was created by Robert Taft and Fred Hartley. The Taft-Hartley Act was enabled to replace the Wagner Act of 1935. The Taft-Harley Act has many components to it, but the one most vital to this strike is it “made illegal were secondary strikes, secondary boycotts, and sympathy strikes, which were designed to influence employers other than those with whom the union had a contract.”
- April 22, 1948: 15,000 Boeing Union members went on strike. After not being able to reach an agreement with the company the Union declared a strike.
- September 13, 1948: The Union members that were a part of Lodge 751 reluctantly went back to work. Lodge 751 “represents many men and women throughout Eastern Washington, Oregon and Idaho at various companies in trades such as aluminum workers, metal trades, Transit, delivery, regional disposal workers, workers at Grand Coulee Dam, auto mechanics, heavy duty mechanics, machinists, welder fabricators, refrigerator repairmen, building maintenance, irrigation workers and many others.”
- February 25, 1949: BOEING AIRPLANE CO. et al. v. NATIONAL LABOR RELATIONS BOARD argued. This court case discussed, “Petitioners appealed a ceased and desist order of the National Labor Relations Board that was issued based on the Board's finding that petitioners violated § 8(a)(5) and § 8(a)(1) of the National Labor Relations Act, 29 U.S.C.S. § 158.”
- May 31, 1949: BOEING AIRPLANE CO. et al. v. NATIONAL LABOR RELATIONS BOARD decided. The verdict of the case was that the Boeing Company was not at fault for the allegations that they were being charged for. Instead the court found the Union violated the Taft-Harley Act by not providing notice of their strike.
- June 12, 1950: BOEING AIRPLANE CO. v. AERONAUTICAL INDUSTRIAL DIST. LODGE NO. 751, OF INTERNATIONAL ASSN. OF MACHINISTS et al. This court case is address the fact that Lodge 751 broke the contract of not giving notice before going on strike. The verdict was when Boeing gave a letter to Lodge 751 that said “The strike which began last night and which is now continuing at the Seattle plants of the Company and which the union caused and sanctioned is in direct violation and repudiation of the collective Bargaining Agreement dated January 5, 1944, as amended March 16, 1946, between Boeing Aircraft Company and Aeronautical Industrial District Lodge 751 and International Association of Machinists.” What this letter essentially did was nullify their contract. Which as discussed in BOEING AIRPLANE CO. v. AERONAUTICAL INDUSTRIAL DISTRICT LODGE NO. 751, INTERNATIONAL ASS'N OF MACHINISTS, et al. “The power of termination which accrues to the wronged party as a result of such a breach and was exercised by Boeing in this case is a right of rescission which leaves neither party with any basis thereafter to complain of the conduct of the other as a breach of the contract.” What this means is that the Union was not exactly guilty of going on strike since at that point in time there was no contract between Lodge 751 and Boeing.
- March 27, 1951: BOEING AIRPLANE CO. v. AERONAUTICAL INDUSTRIAL DISTRICT LODGE NO. 751, INTERNATIONAL ASS'N OF MACHINISTS, et al. This court case is an appeal for the verdict that happened in BOEING AIRPLANE CO. v. AERONAUTICAL INDUSTRIAL DIST. LODGE NO. 751, OF INTERNATIONAL ASSN. OF MACHINISTS et al. The verdict of this case was that the ruling from the previous case was to stand.
- March 26, 1953: “The National Labor Relations Board issued a decision and order dismissing the major portion of an amended complaint against Boeing Airplane Company but finding violation of the Act, 29 U.S.C.A. § 151 et seq., in certain particulars and ordering the company to cease and desist from certain action and requiring reinstatement and restoration of pay lost by certain employees.”
- April 13, 1953: Boeing filed to have the order reviewed that the National Labor Relations Board released.
- September 23, 1954: BOEING AIRPLANE COMPANY, a corporation, Petitioner, v. NATIONAL LABOR RELATIONS BOARD, Respondent This court case is discussing additional violations that were found against the Act of not declaring to strike.

== Aftermath ==
Allen declared the strike illegal and proceeded to have multiple lawsuits over the fact. The result of the strike set back Boeing with their orders about 1.25 billion dollars. Boeing was then forced to hire about 50,000 to make for lost time and pushing out orders. Most of the orders were for the government making B-47s, B-50s, and C-97s.
