= 1948 Swiss sugar industry referendum =

Referendum in Switzerland

14 March 1948

Results
Choice	Votes	%
Yes	272,701	36.16%
No	481,352	63.84%
Valid votes	754,053	96.87%
Invalid or blank votes	24,374	3.13%
Total votes	778,427	100.00%
Registered voters/turnout	1,376,490	56.55%

A referendum on the sugar industry was held in Switzerland on 14 March 1948. Voters were asked whether they approved of a federal resolution on the reorganisation of the Swiss sugar industry. The proposal was rejected by 63.8% of voters.

== Background ==
The referendum was an optional referendum, which only a majority of the vote, as opposed to the mandatory referendums, which required a double majority; a majority of the popular vote and majority of the cantons.

== Results ==
Choice	Votes	%
For	272,701	36.16
Against	481,352	63.84
Total	754,053	100.00
Valid votes	754,053	96.87
Invalid votes	1,517	0.19
Blank votes	22,857	2.94
Total votes	778,427	100.00
Registered voters/turnout	1,376,490	56.55
Source: Nohlen & Stöver
