= Hebei–Rehe–Chahar Campaign =

1948 military campaign

Hebei-Rehe-Chahar Campaign
- Part of the Chinese Civil War
Date	May 12, 1948 – June 25, 1948
Location	Hebei, Rehe, and Chahar
Result	Communist victory

Belligerents
Flag of the National Revolutionary Army National Revolutionary Army	PLA Chinese Red Army

Commanders and leaders
Fu Zuoyi	Yang Dezhi; Luo Ruiqing

Strength
130,000	80,000

Casualties and losses
24,390+	Unknown

The Hebei – Rehe – Chahar Campaign (冀热察战役) was a series of battles fought in Northern China between the nationalists and the communists during the Chinese Civil War in the post World War II era, and resulted in communist victory.

== Prelude ==
In the spring of 1948, the nationalist forces in Northeast China totaling 550,000 troops were besieged in three isolated pockets in Changchun, Shenyang and Jinzhou. In order to reinforce the nationalists in Northeast China, Chiang Kai-shek redeployed the nationalist Reorganized 54th Division from Qingdao to Jinzhou, and attempted to send reinforcement from Northern China as well. To prevent nationalist forces in Northern China from reinforcing Northeast China, the communists decided to launch a campaign in northern China to tie down the local nationalist forces.

== Order of battle ==
Nationalist order of battle

- The 3rd Army
- The 4th Army
- The 16th Army
- The 35th Army
- The 92nd Army
- The 94th Army
- The 151st Division
- 2 brigades of the 8th Army

Communist order of battle

- The 3rd Column of the II Corps
- The 4th Column of the II Corps
- The 4th Brigade of the 2nd Column
- The 11th Column of the Northeastern Military District
- Three independent divisions of the Hebei – Rehe – Liaoning Military District

== Campaign ==
On May 12, 1948, the 11th Column of the communist Northeastern Military District ambushed two nationalist regiments returning to Chengde from Flat Spring (Ping Quan, 平泉) at regions of Three Ditches (三沟) and Six Ditches (六沟), badly mauling the nationalist units. At night of May 13, 1948, the communist 2nd Column started its eastward push by striking the nationalist strongholds in Yanqing. The nationalists redeployed their 35th Army, 94th Army, 3rd Army and 4th Army to Huailai, Yanqing and Xuanhua, while detachments from the nationalist 16th Army and 92nd Army were redeployed to Shahe and Nakou in an attempt to besiege the enemy, but the enemy had already passed the region to the east of Yanqing and continued its eastward push. By June 2, 1948, with the help of the 11th Column of the communist Northeast Military District and units of the communist Hebei – Rehe – Liaoning Military District, the communist II Corps had severed the Beijing – Chengde Railway, taking towns / counties including Luanping (滦平) County, Longhua (隆化), Fengning (丰宁), and Flat Spring (Ping Quan, 平泉). As Chengde in the north and Beijing in the south were both threatened by the communist success, the nationalists were forced to redeploy three armies and two divisions from Huailai and Yanqing to Pinggu, and along the railroad from Huairou to Beijing to boost the local defense.

In order to disperse the nationalists, the communists redeployed their forces. Three independent divisions of the communist Hebei – Rehe – Liaoning Military District and the 3rd Column of the communist II Corps were organized into Right Flank Corps to penetrate into Pinggu region, while the communist 4th Brigade of the 2nd Column and the communist 4th Column were organized into the Left Flank Corps to strike eastern Hebei. By June 15, 1948, a dozen nationalist strongholds had fallen into enemy hands, including Fengrun (丰润), Renge Village (Rege Zhuang, 任各庄), Hazel Town (Zhenzi Zhen, 榛子镇) and Wild Chicken Tuo (Yeji Tuo, (野鸡坨)). The nationalist 151st Division defending the region was badly mauled by the enemy, losing over 5,000 troops and Tangshan was gravely threatened. In order to ensure the safety of Tangshan and the Beijing – Shanhai Pass Railway, the nationalists were forced to redeploy seven divisions from Pinggu, reaching Fengrun (丰润) on June 18, 1948. Meanwhile, two nationalist brigades of the nationalist 8th Army in Shandong were transported to Qinghuangdao by sea and then pushed toward to the region west of Luan (滦) county in an attempt to besiege the enemy, but the enemy was already withdrawn to Lulong (卢龙) and Qian'an (迁安) regions, thus successfully avoided the nationalist trap. Taking the advantage of the failed nationalist attempt to trap the enemy, the communist Right Flank Corps struck northward, taking Stone Box (Shixia, 石匣), Little Battalion (Xiao Ying, 小营) and besieged Ancient North Gate (Gu Bei Kou, 古北口) on June 19, 1948, thus forcing the nationalists to withdraw their troops elsewhere and redeploy them to reinforce the northern front. Taking the advantage of the nationalist redeployment, the communist 11th Column and the communist Left Flank Corps launched another offensive on June 23, 1948, and by June 25, 1948, successfully took all of the nationalist strongholds along the Stone Gate Street (Shi Men Jie, 石门街) to Lichang (昌黎) City line, thus concluding the campaign by severing the important link between northern China and Northeast China on land.

== Outcome ==
The nationalists lose over 24,390 troops in this campaign, including over 17,350 captured alive by the enemy and over 7,040 killed. Seven cities / towns and vast rural regions fell into the enemy hands, and additionally, the enemy had severed the communication / transportation lines of Beijing – Suiyuan Railway, Beijing – Chengde Railway, Beijing – Liaoning Railway, and Beijing – Hankou Railway. In contrast, the communists had successfully prevented the nationalists from sending nationalist force in northern China to Northeast China, in addition to the successes just described. The nationalist defeat was mainly due to the Chiang Kai-shek's uncompromising doctrine of holding on to as much land as possible, and as long as possible, which overstretched the numerically superior nationalist forces as they were dispersed to garrison vast regions. As a result, none of the garrison had enough strength to fight when enemy concentrated their forces and attacked with overwhelmingly numerically superior force.

== See also ==
- Outline of the Chinese Civil War
- History of the People's Liberation Army
- National Revolutionary Army
- People's Liberation Army
