= Summil =

Summil صميل Summeil
- Former village
- Etymology: "Hard and withered"
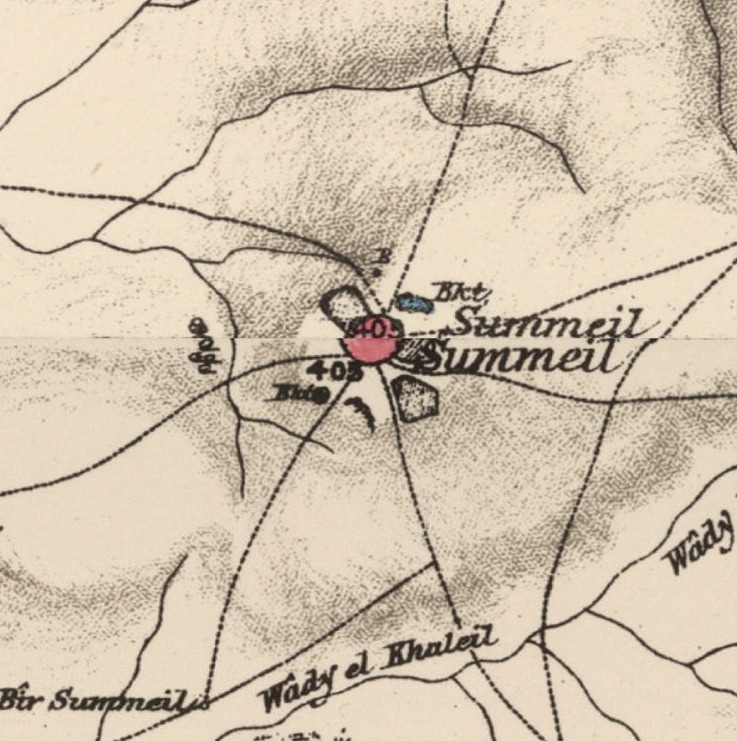
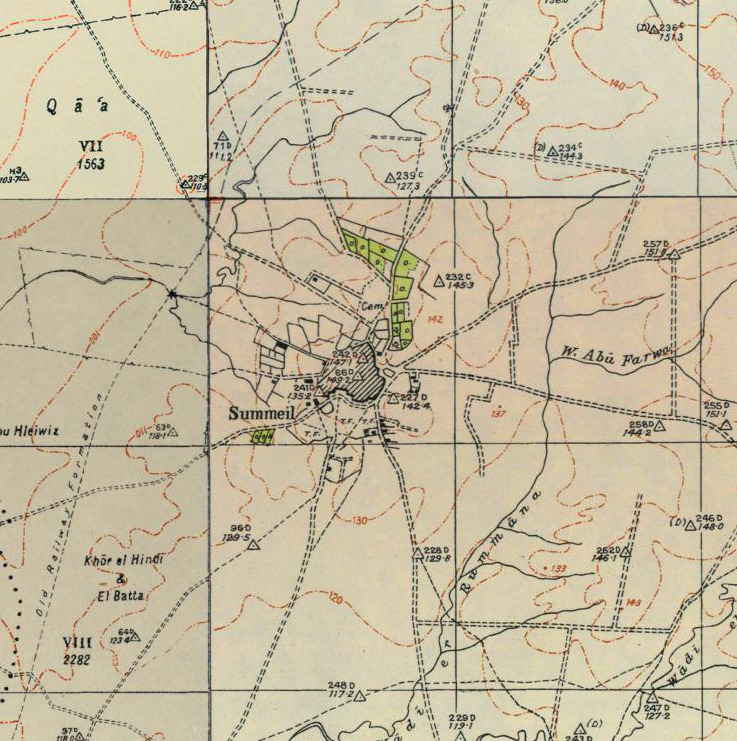
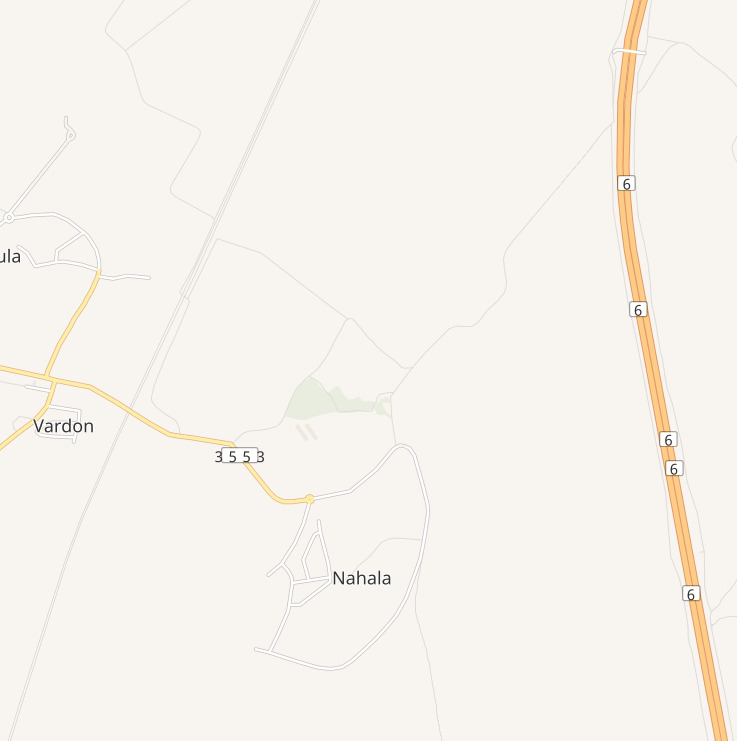
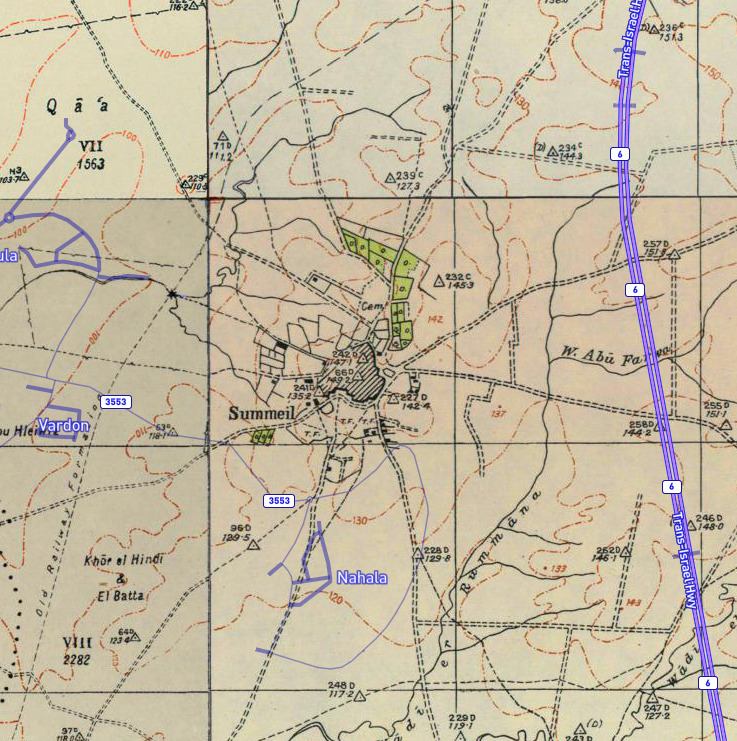
- 1870s map 1940s map modern map 1940s with modern overlay map A series of historical maps of the area around Summil (click the buttons)

- Location within Mandatory Palestine
- Coordinates: 31°39′56″N 34°47′43″E
- Grid position: 130/119
- Geopolitical entity: Mandatory Palestine
- Subdistrict: Gaza
- Date of depopulation: mid-July, 1948

Area
  - Total: 19,304 dunams (19.304 km^{2}; 7.453 sq mi)

Population (1945)
  - Total: 950
- Cause(s) of depopulation: Military assault by Yishuv forces
- Current Localities: Kedma, Sgula, Menuha, Nahala, Vardon

Summil (Arabic: صميل) was a Palestinian Arab village in the Gaza Subdistrict, located 36 kilometers (22 mi) northeast of Gaza. It was situated on a sandy hill in the coastal plain and had a population of 950 in 1945. It was depopulated during the 1948 Arab-Israeli War.

== History ==
=== Roman period ===
A marble bust of Pan, dating from the 1st or 2nd century CE, has been found here.

=== Crusader and Mamluk periods ===
Summil was founded in 1168 during the Crusades by the Hospitallers for the purpose of protecting the fortress in Bayt Jibrin. There are some remains of the Crusader castle (see photos here), and a medieval masonry well known as Bir Summail survives south of it. Local tradition claims it was named after Samuel, one of the Crusaders who established the village. Under Mamluk rule in the 13th-15th centuries, it was referred to as Barakat al-Khalil ("the blessing of Ibrahim (Abraham)"), because its tax revenues were used by the sultan Barquq to endow the Ibrahimi Mosque in Hebron.

=== Ottoman period ===
Summil was incorporated into the Ottoman Empire in 1517 with all of Palestine, and in the 1596 tax records it was part of nahiya (subdistrict) of Gaza under the Gaza Sanjak, with a population of 66 Muslim household, an estimated 363 persons. The villagers paid a fixed tax rate of 33,3% on wheat, barley, fruit, beehives, and goats; a total of 14,500 akçe. All of the revenue went to a waqf.

When Edward Robinson visited Summil in the 1838, he noted that it was a "considerable village on an elevation of the plain". He noticed a public well over 100 feet (30 m) deep and 11 feet (3.4 m) in diameter. He said that there was a "portion of an ancient wall apparently once belonging to a castle." It was also noted as a Muslim village located in the Gaza district.

In 1863, French explorer Victor Guérin found the village, which he called Soummeil el-Khalil, to have 400 inhabitants. Some of the houses were built of stone, other of adobe. He further noted a waly, dedicated to a Sheikh Abdallah, which was a well built enclosure built of large stones. An Ottoman village list of about 1870 indicated 50 houses and a population of 133, though the population count included men, only.

In 1882 the PEF's Survey of Western Palestine described Summeil as "a small village on the edge of the higher ground, of mud and stone, with cactus hedges. A pond on the south and a well on the north supply the place. Near the latter there is a pointed archway of good masonry, apparently mediæval work, and there are foundations of hewn stones in the village. [The well] Bir Summeil is south of the village, is also a well-built masonry well, and the place evidently dates back to Crusading times at least." In the late 19th century, Summil had a semi-circular plan.

=== British Mandate of Palestine ===
During the British Mandate period, the village expanded toward the southwest and relied on al-Faluja for commercial, medical, and administrative services.

In the 1922 census of Palestine conducted by the British Mandate authorities, Summail had a population of 561 inhabitants, all Muslims, increasing in the 1931 census, to 692, still all Muslims, in 178 houses.

In the 1945 statistics the population of Summeil consisted of 950 Muslims and the total land area was 19,304 dunams, according to an official land and population survey. Of this, a total of 54 dunams were used plantations and irrigable land, 18,720 for cereals, while 31 dunams were built-up areas.

A mosque built on the remnants of a Crusader church was maintained by the Muslim inhabitants. Village houses were built of adobe brick and a school opened in 1936. By the mid-1940s it had an enrollment of 88 students. The community obtained domestic water from a 48 meters (157 ft) deep well named "al-Khalil".

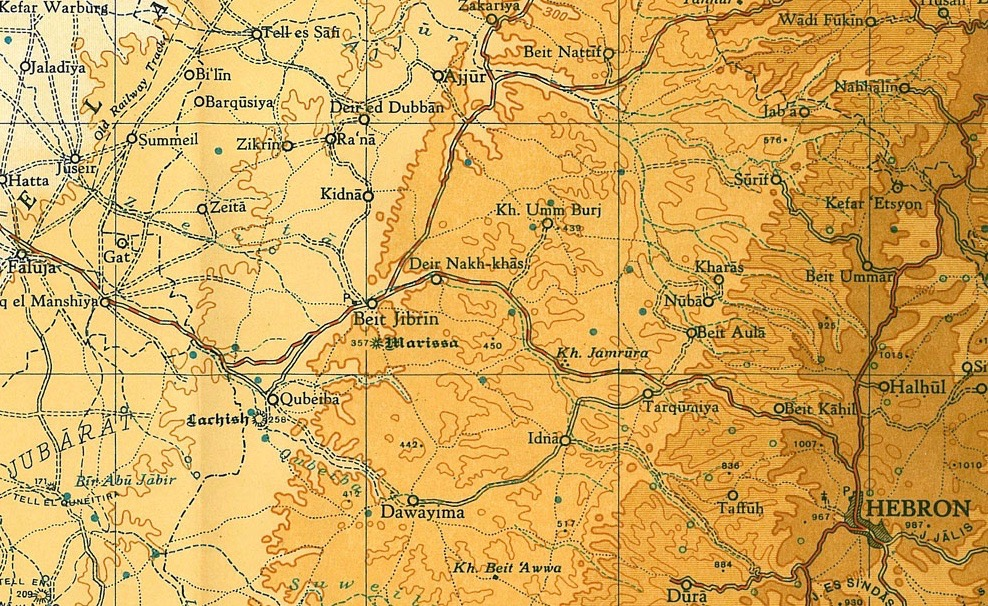
Summil 1948 1:250,000 (top left quadrant)

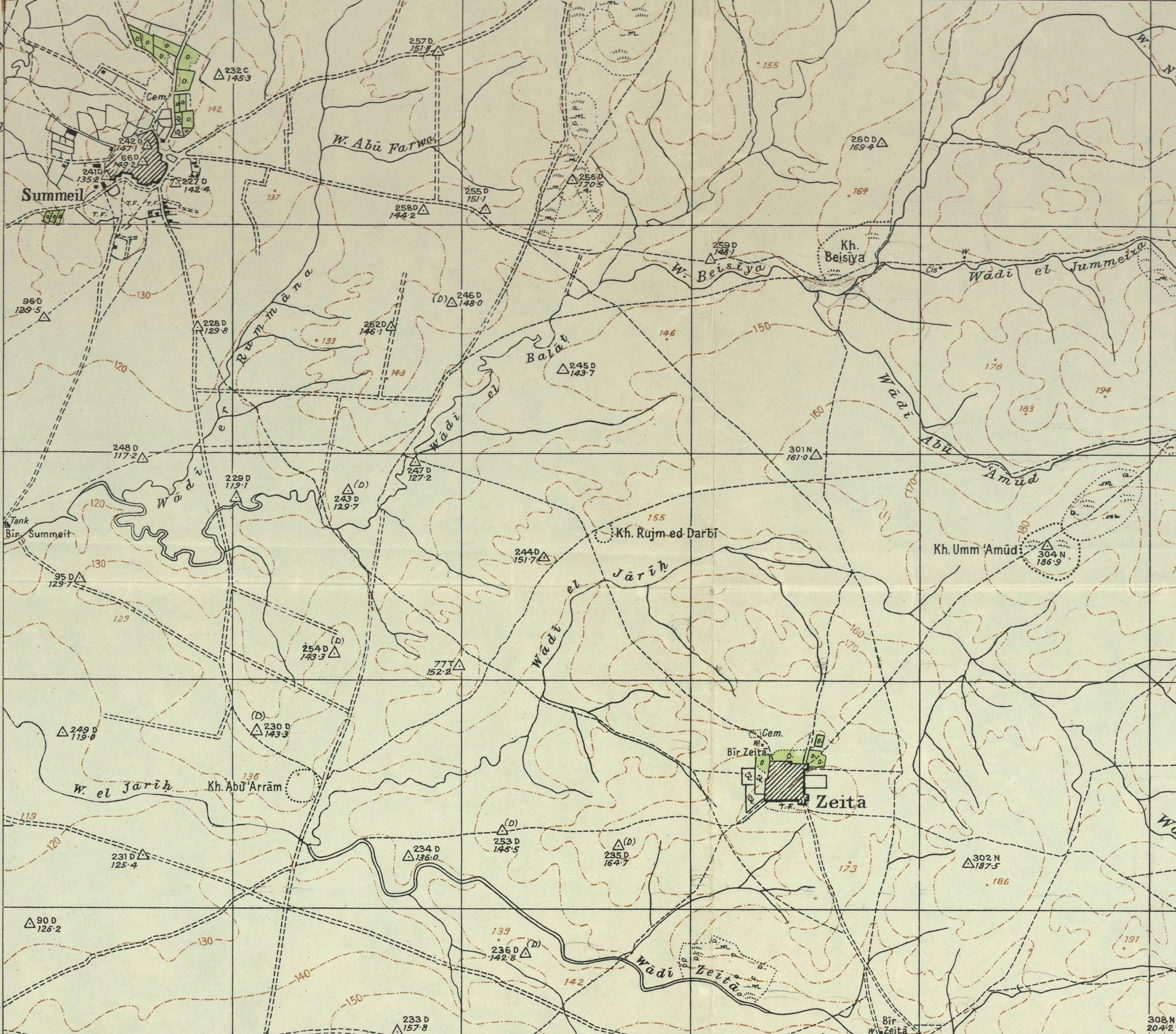
Summil 1948 1:20,000

=== 1948 and aftermath ===
Summil was occupied by the Givati Brigade's thrust southward during the period in the 1948 Arab-Israeli War known as the Ten Days between the truces of July 8 and July 18, 1948. During this offensive, Israeli forces managed to occupy a broad swath of territory south of the Jerusalem-Ramla road, displacing over 20,000 people. Although Israeli military accounts later claimed that the inhabitants fled with the approach of Israeli columns, the Haganah spoke of "several cleaning operations" with Summil being one of the villages mentioned. Its inhabitants fled east toward the Hebron area.

On July 19, 1948, an IDF patrol clashed with armed infiltrators at Summil, killing one and wounding another. The patrol warned any refugees they encountered that if any one of them entered "the areas under our control-they would be killed". The day after, on the July 20, the IDF were formally instructed to prevent infiltration to Summil, Barqusya, Bi´lin, Masmiya al Saghira, al-Tina, Kheima, Idnibba, Jilya, Qazaza, and Mughallis. The orders specifically were to "destroy" any "armed force" encountered, and to "expel...unarmed villagers".

The Palestinian historian Walid Khalidi described the village remains in 1992 as: "The remnants of a wall, perhaps one that was built around the village, are still visible. Otherwise, much of the site is overgrown with khubbayza (a wild plant belonging to the mallow family that is cooked as a vegetable in Palestinian peasant cuisine) and grass. There is also a Christ's-thorn trees and dense stands of cactuses; an old cactus-lined village road is visible. A shanty that houses an Arab family (whose members probably work in one of the Israeli settlements) has been built on the land. The adjacent land is cultivated by Israeli farmers."

Andrew Petersen, who visited in 1994, noted: "The castle appears to be roughly square with a central tower (keep) surrounded by an outer enclosure wall with square corner towers. The principal remains are those of the north enclosure wall which stands to a height of over 8m and is over 30m long and 1,5m thick. The lower part of the wall has a well−preserved glacis."

== See also ==
- Depopulated Palestinian locations in Israel

== Bibliography ==
- Barron, J.B., ed. (1923). Palestine: Report and General Abstracts of the Census of 1922. Government of Palestine.
- Conder, C.R.; Kitchener, H.H. (1882). The Survey of Western Palestine: Memoirs of the Topography, Orography, Hydrography, and Archaeology (SWP). Vol. 2. London: Committee of the Palestine Exploration Fund.
- Conder, C.R.; Kitchener, H.H. (1883). The Survey of Western Palestine: Memoirs of the Topography, Orography, Hydrography, and Archaeology (SWP). Vol. 3. London: Committee of the Palestine Exploration Fund.
- Department of Statistics (1945). Village Statistics, April, 1945. Government of Palestine.
- Guérin, V. (1869). Description Géographique Historique et Archéologique de la Palestine (in French). Vol. 1: Judee, pt. 2. Paris: L'Imprimerie Nationale.
- Hadawi, S. (1970). Village Statistics of 1945: A Classification of Land and Area ownership in Palestine. Palestine Liberation Organization Research Center.
- Hartmann, M. (1883). "Die Ortschaftenliste des Liwa Jerusalem in dem türkischen Staatskalender für Syrien auf das Jahr 1288 der Flucht (1871)". Zeitschrift des Deutschen Palästina-Vereins. 6: 102–149.
- Hütteroth, W.-D.; Abdulfattah, K. (1977). Historical Geography of Palestine, Transjordan and Southern Syria in the Late 16th Century. Erlanger Geographische Arbeiten, Sonderband 5. Erlangen, Germany: Vorstand der Fränkischen Geographischen Gesellschaft. ISBN 3-920405-41-2.
- Iliffe, J.H. (1934). "A bust of Pan". Quarterly of the Department of Antiquities in Palestine. 3: 165–166.
- Khalidi, W. (1992). All That Remains: The Palestinian Villages Occupied and Depopulated by Israel in 1948. Washington D.C.: Institute for Palestine Studies. ISBN 0-88728-224-5. No online access to relevant pages.
- Mills, E., ed. (1932). Census of Palestine 1931. Population of Villages, Towns and Administrative Areas. Jerusalem: Government of Palestine.
- Morris, B. (2004). The Birth of the Palestinian Refugee Problem Revisited. Cambridge University Press. ISBN 978-0-521-00967-6.
- Palmer, E.H. (1881). The Survey of Western Palestine: Arabic and English Name Lists Collected During the Survey by Lieutenants Conder and Kitchener, R. E. Transliterated and Explained by E.H. Palmer. Committee of the Palestine Exploration Fund.
- Petersen, Andrew (2001). A Gazetteer of Buildings in Muslim Palestine (British Academy Monographs in Archaeology). Vol. 1. Oxford University Press. ISBN 978-0-19-727011-0.
- Pringle, D. (1997). Secular buildings in the Crusader Kingdom of Jerusalem: an archaeological Gazetter. Cambridge University Press. ISBN 0521-46010-7. Summail and Bir Summail (209), p. 97. Describes the remains of the castle and the medieval masonry well (Bir Summail) south of it.
- Robinson, E.; Smith, E. (1841). Biblical Researches in Palestine, Mount Sinai and Arabia Petraea: A Journal of Travels in the year 1838. Vol. 2. Boston: Crocker & Brewster.
- Robinson, E.; Smith, E. (1841). Biblical Researches in Palestine, Mount Sinai and Arabia Petraea: A Journal of Travels in the year 1838. Vol. 3. Boston: Crocker & Brewster.
- Socin, A. (1879). "Alphabetisches Verzeichniss von Ortschaften des Paschalik Jerusalem". Zeitschrift des Deutschen Palästina-Vereins. 2: 135–163.
