= Mughallis =

Mughallis مٌغلّس
- Village
- Etymology: Coming to water at the morning twilight, or making a raid at that time.
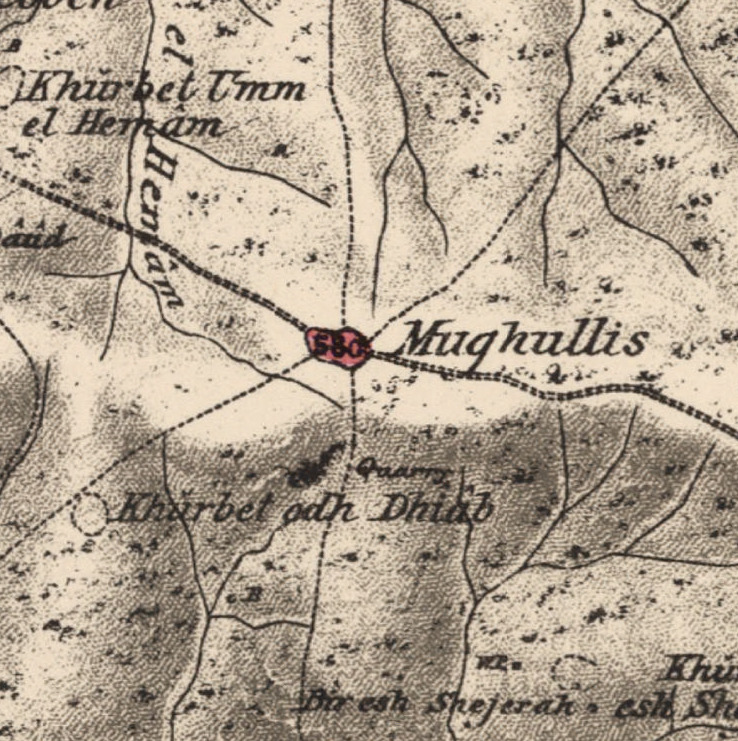
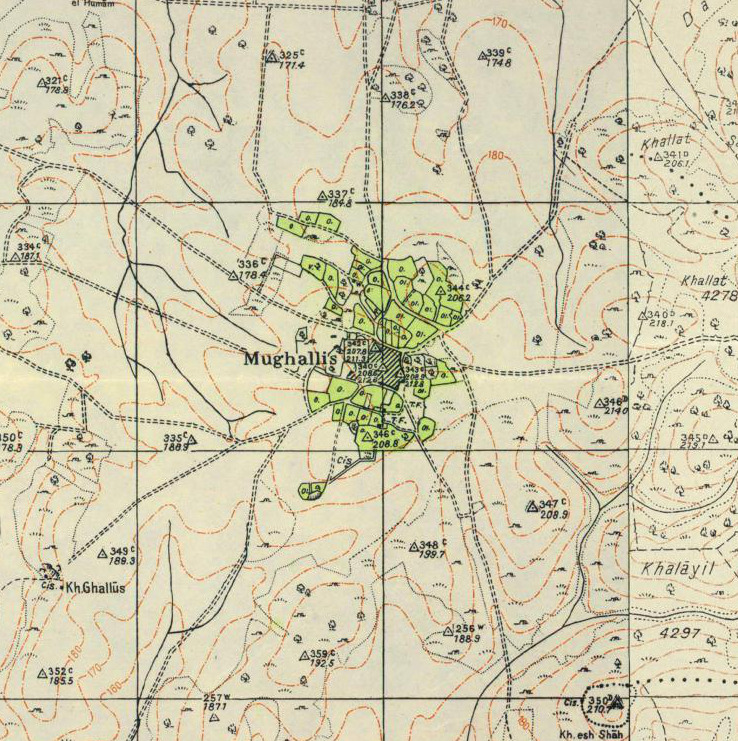
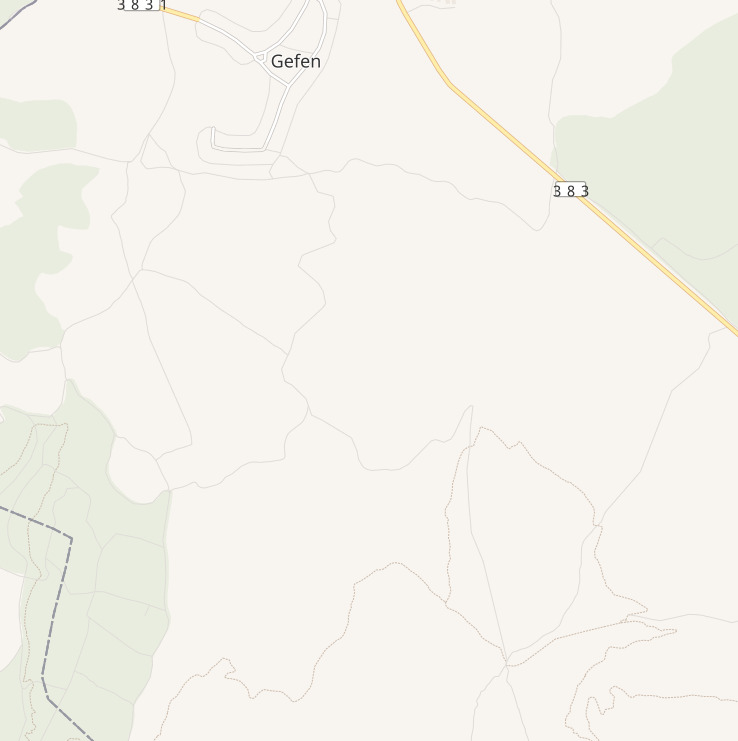
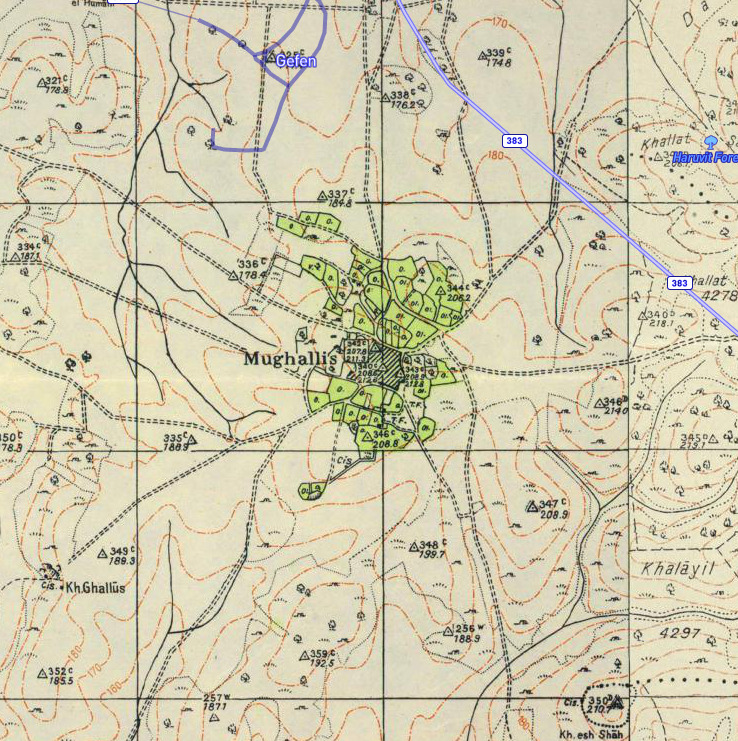
- 1870s map 1940s map modern map 1940s with modern overlay map A series of historical maps of the area around Mughallis (click the buttons)

- Location within Mandatory Palestine
- Coordinates: 31°43′45″N 34°52′57″E
- Palestine grid: 139/126
- Geopolitical entity: Mandatory Palestine
- Subdistrict: Hebron
- Date of depopulation: July 9–10, 1948

Area
  - Total: 11,459 dunams (11.459 km^{2}; 4.424 sq mi)

Population (1945)
  - Total: 540]
- Cause(s) of depopulation: Influence of nearby town's fall
- Current Localities: Gefen

Mughallis (Arabic: مٌغلّس) was a Palestinian Arab village located 30.5 kilometers (19.0 mi) northwest of Hebron. It was depopulated during the 1948 Arab-Israeli War between July 9–10, 1948 as part of Operation An-Far.

== History ==
=== Ottoman era ===
It was incorporated into the Ottoman Empire in 1517 with the rest of Palestine, and by the 1596 tax records it was located it nahiya (subdistrict) of Gaza, part of Gaza Sanjak, with a population of 77 household, an estimated 424 persons, all Muslims. The villagers paid a fixed tax-rate of 25% on agricultural products, including wheat, barley, summer crops, fruit trees, goats and beehives, in addition to occasional revenues; a total of 10,350 akçe. All of the revenue went to a Waqf.

In May 1863 Victor Guérin described it as a hamlet, still inhabited by a few families, and was designated to him by the name of Deir al Mokhalles, which Guérin translated as the Convent of the Saviour. He noted that the name probably derived from a former convent, which formerly existed at the place.

An Ottoman village list of about 1870 showed that Meghallis had 27 houses and a population of 71, though the population count included men, only.

In 1882, the PEF's Survey of Western Palestine (SWP) described Mughullis as: "A village of moderate size, approached by an ancient road, and principally consisting of stone houses."

=== British Mandate era ===
In the 1922 census of Palestine, conducted by the British Mandate for Palestine, the population was recorded as 311 Muslims, increasing in the 1931 census to 447 Muslims, in 93 houses.

In the 1945 statistics it had a population of 540 Muslims, with 11,459 dunams of land. 88 dunams were plantations and irrigable land, 7,277 for cereals, while 23 dunams were built-up (urban) land.

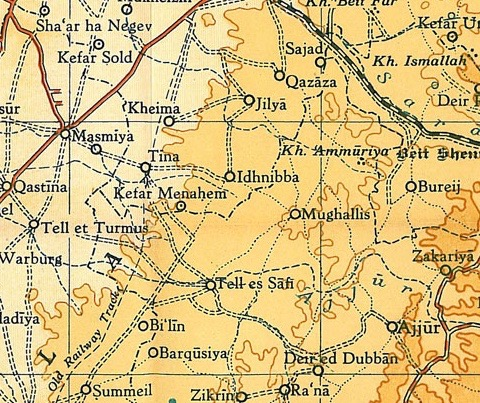
Mughallis 1945 1:250,000

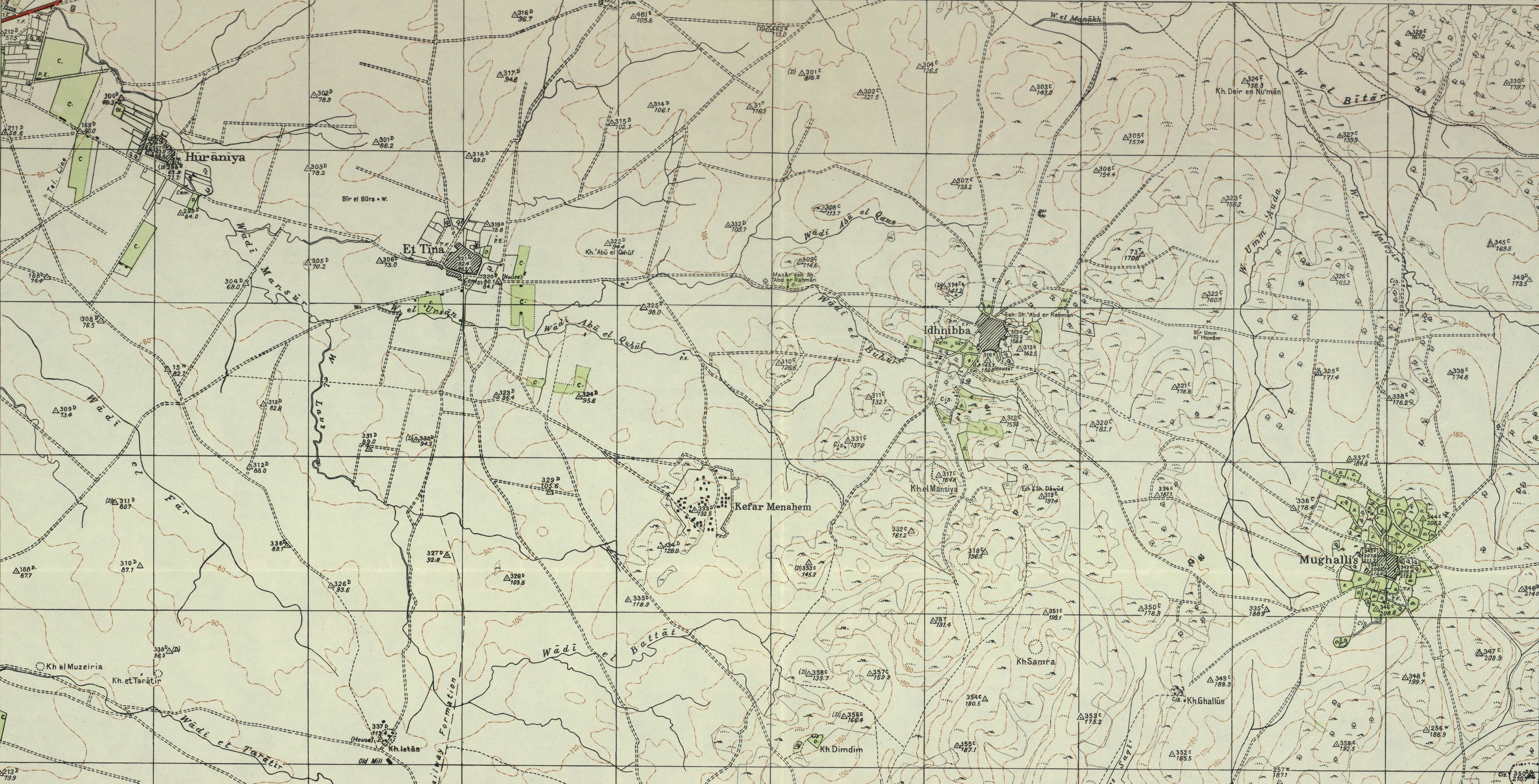
Mughallis 1948 1:20,000

=== 1948, aftermath ===
Mughallis became depopulated on July 9–10, 1948. On 16 July, Giv‘ati HQ informed General Staff\Operations that "our forces have entered the villages of Qazaza, Kheima, Jilya, ‘Idnibba and Mughallis, expelled the inhabitants, [and] blown up and torched a number of houses. The area is at the moment clear of Arabs."

The IDF were instructed to prevent infiltration to Summeil, Barqusya, Bi‘lin, Masmiya al Saghira, al Tina, Kheima, Idnibba, Jilya, Qazaza, and Mughallis. The orders specifically were to "destroy" any "armed force" encountered and to "expel.....unarmed villagers". During the following days, patrols expelled refugees near Tel as Safi, al Tina, and Mughallis, apparently killing three of those initially detained. In mid August 1948, a Giv‘ati patrol re-visited Idnibba, Mughallis, Jilya, Qazaza and Sajd, killing "a handful of Arabs" in a number of clashes.

In 1955 Gefen was founded on village land, north of the village site.

In 1992 the village site was described: "The site and surrounding area are fenced in. The debris from the houses have been levelled, and one can still see building components. Remnants of a house on the east side are ringed by stone markers that formerly identified the boundaries of a home garden. Numerous trees, including olive and carob trees, grow on all sides and cactuses are found on the northern and southern edges."

== Bibliography ==
- Barron, J.B., ed. (1923). Palestine: Report and General Abstracts of the Census of 1922. Government of Palestine.
- Conder, C.R.; Kitchener, H.H. (1882). The Survey of Western Palestine: Memoirs of the Topography, Orography, Hydrography, and Archaeology. Vol. 2. London: Committee of the Palestine Exploration Fund.
- Department of Statistics (1945). Village Statistics, April, 1945. Government of Palestine.
- Guérin, V. (1869). Description Géographique Historique et Archéologique de la Palestine (in French). Vol. 1: Judee, pt. 2. Paris: L'Imprimerie Nationale.
- Hadawi, S. (1970). Village Statistics of 1945: A Classification of Land and Area ownership in Palestine. Palestine Liberation Organization Research Center.
- Hartmann, M. (1883). "Die Ortschaftenliste des Liwa Jerusalem in dem türkischen Staatskalender für Syrien auf das Jahr 1288 der Flucht (1871)". Zeitschrift des Deutschen Palästina-Vereins. 6: 102–149.
- Hütteroth, W.-D.; Abdulfattah, K. (1977). Historical Geography of Palestine, Transjordan and Southern Syria in the Late 16th Century. Erlanger Geographische Arbeiten, Sonderband 5. Erlangen, Germany: Vorstand der Fränkischen Geographischen Gesellschaft. ISBN 3-920405-41-2.
- Khalidi, W. (1992). All That Remains: The Palestinian Villages Occupied and Depopulated by Israel in 1948. Washington D.C.: Institute for Palestine Studies. ISBN 0-88728-224-5.
- Mills, E., ed. (1932). Census of Palestine 1931. Population of Villages, Towns and Administrative Areas. Jerusalem: Government of Palestine.
- Morris, B. (2004). The Birth of the Palestinian Refugee Problem Revisited. Cambridge University Press. ISBN 978-0-521-00967-6.
- Palmer, E.H. (1881). The Survey of Western Palestine: Arabic and English Name Lists Collected During the Survey by Lieutenants Conder and Kitchener, R. E. Transliterated and Explained by E.H. Palmer. Committee of the Palestine Exploration Fund.
- Socin, A. (1879). "Alphabetisches Verzeichniss von Ortschaften des Paschalik Jerusalem". Zeitschrift des Deutschen Palästina-Vereins. 2: 135–163.
