= Idnibba =

Idnibba إدنبّة Dhenebbeh
- Etymology: The lower part of a valley through which water flows.
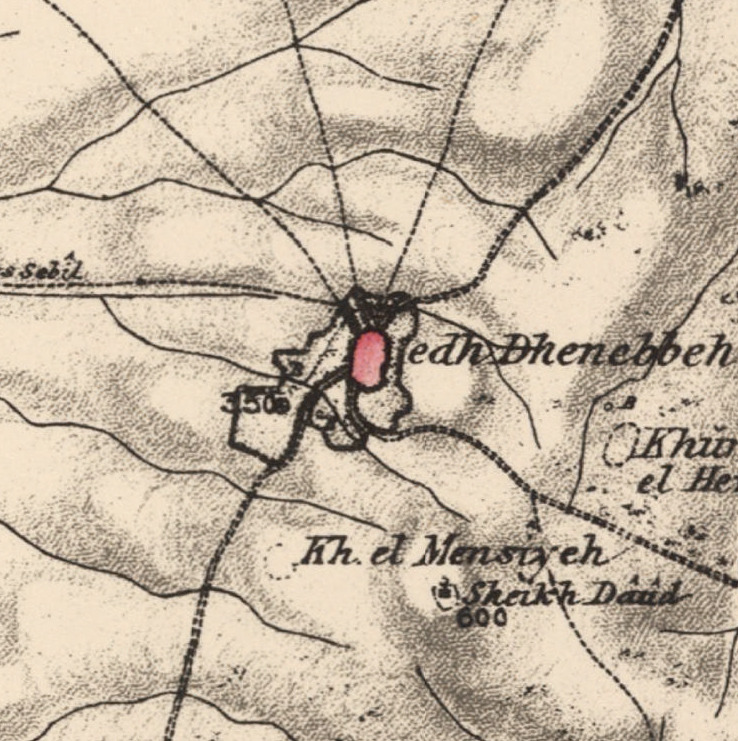
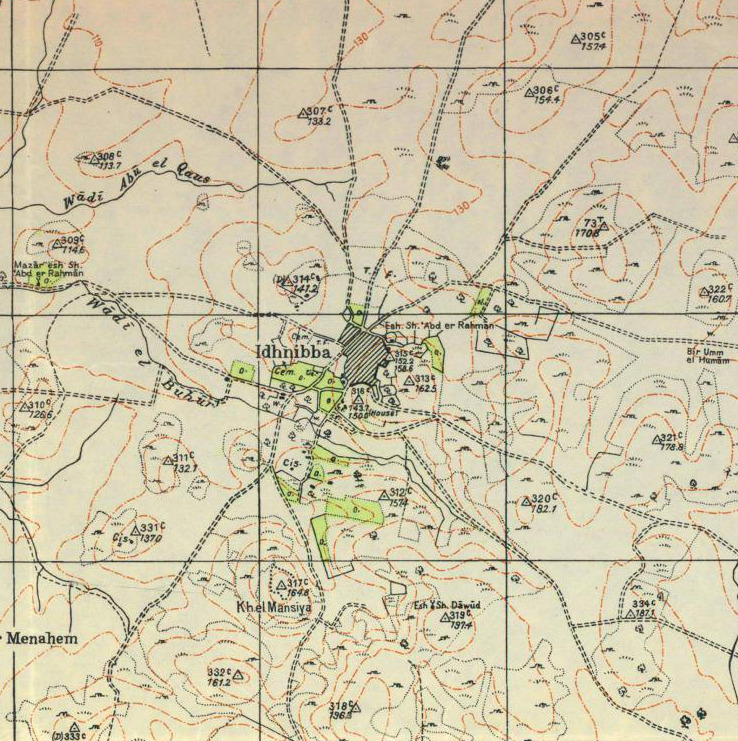
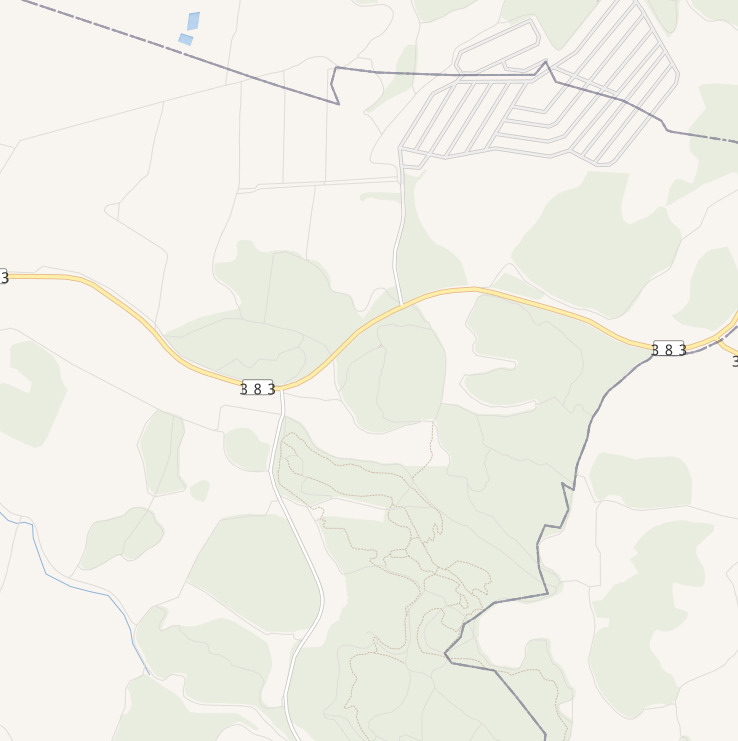
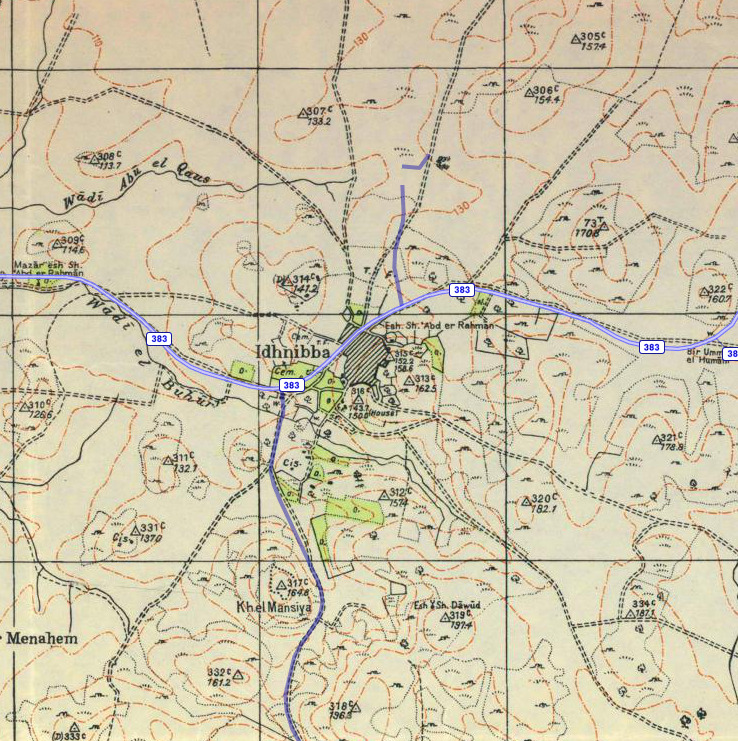
- 1870s map 1940s map modern map 1940s with modern overlay map A series of historical maps of the area around Idnibba (click the buttons)

- Location within Mandatory Palestine
- Coordinates: 31°44′32″N 34°51′22″E
- Palestine grid: 136/127
- Geopolitical entity: Mandatory Palestine
- Subdistrict: Ramle
- Date of depopulation: July 9–10, 1948

Area
  - Total: 8,103 dunams (8.103 km^{2}; 3.129 sq mi)

Population (1945)
  - Total: 490
- Cause(s) of depopulation: Influence of nearby town's fall
- Current Localities: Kfar Menahem

Idnibba (Arabic: إدنبّة) was a Palestinian village, located at latitude 31.7426937N and longitude 34.8561001,E in the southern part of the Ramle Subdistrict. It was depopulated in 1948, at which time its population was 568, and its lands are now used by Kfar Menahem.

== History ==
Idnibba may have been built on the site of the Roman settlement of Danuba. The Crusaders also called it Danuba.

=== Ottoman era ===
In 1517, the village was incorporated into the Ottoman Empire with the rest of Palestine, and in 1596 it appeared under the name of Dinba in the tax registers being in the nahiya (subdistrict) of Gaza under the liwa' (district) of Gaza. It had 36 households, an estimated population of 198; all Muslim. They paid taxes on a number of crops, including wheat, barley and sesame seeds, as well as goats and beehives; a total of 10,800 akçe.

In 1838, Edward Robinson noted Idhnibbeh as a Muslim village located in the Gaza district.

In 1863 Victor Guérin found the village to be situated on a low hill, and with a population of 600. He also noted a well which was built with ancient blocks, and olives gardens surrounding the village. An Ottoman village list from about 1870 found that the village (calling it ed-denube) had a population of 265, in a total of 74 houses, though the population count included men, only.

In 1882 the PEF's Survey of Western Palestine (SWP) described Idnibba as a village built of stone and adobe and situated on high ground. It was surrounded by cactus hedges and had a fig tree orchard to the south.

=== British Mandate era ===
In the 1922 census of Palestine, conducted by the British Mandate authorities, Idnebbeh had a population of 275 Muslims, increasing in the 1931 census to 345, still all Muslims, in a total of 87 houses.

Most villagers worked in agriculture and animal husbandry. In the 1945 statistics the population was 490, all Muslims, while the total land area was 8,103 dunams, according to an official land and population survey. Of this, a total of 5,277 dunums of village land was used for cereals, 85 dunums were irrigated or used for orchards, of which 64 dunums was for olives. while 25 dunams were classified as built-up public areas.

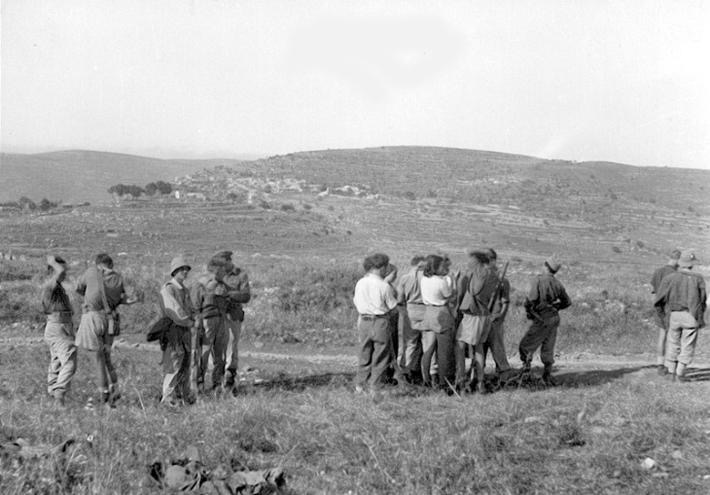
Members of Palmach from Kfar Menachen with Idnibba in distance

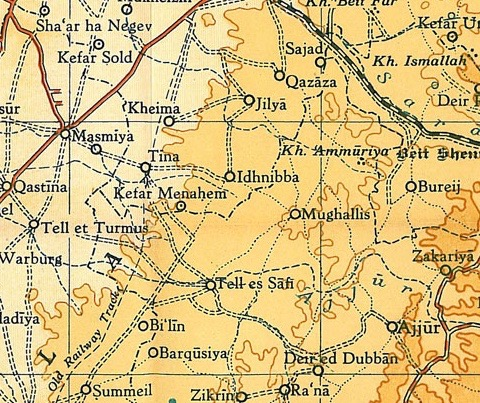
Idnibba 1945 1:250,000

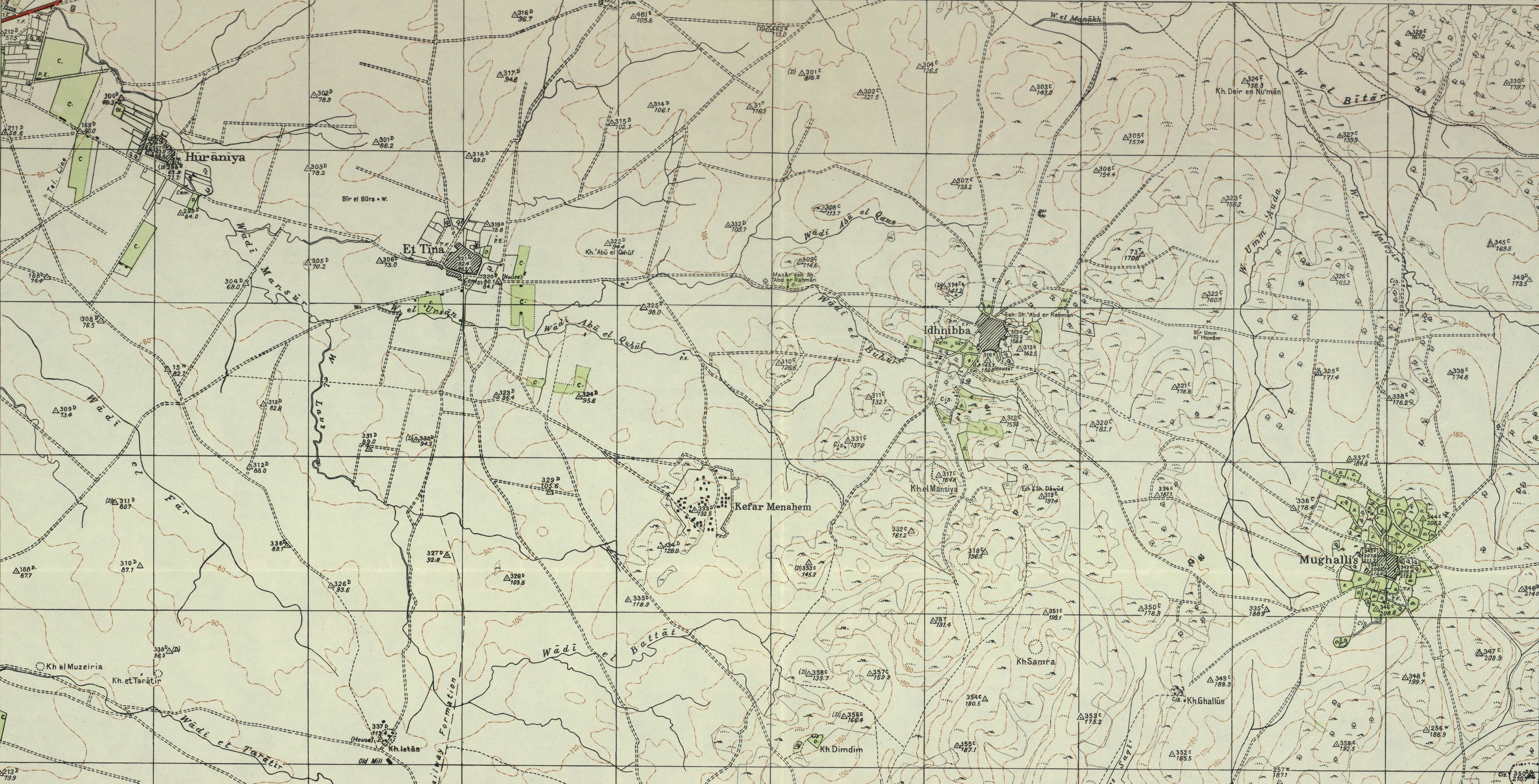
Idnibba 1948 1:20,000

=== 1948 and aftermath ===
On 16 July 1948, during Operation An-Far, Givati HQ informed General Staff\Operations that "our forces have entered the villages of Qazaza, Kheima, Jilya, Idnibba, Mughallis, expelled the inhabitants, [and] blown up and torched a number of houses. The area is at the moment clear of Arabs."

There are no Israeli settlements on village lands. The settlement of Kefar Menachem, built in 1937, is about 2 km southwest of the village site.

Palestinian historian Walid Khalidi described the remains of Idnibba in 1992: "The site and the surrounding lands have been converted into pastures and woods. A large area has been leveled by bulldozers. Demolished walls and the remnants of stone houses lie at various points on the site. There are natural caves with artificial, arched entrances on the upper, western edge of the site."

== See also ==
- Depopulated Palestinian locations in Israel

== Bibliography ==
- Barron, J. B., ed. (1923). Palestine: Report and General Abstracts of the Census of 1922. Government of Palestine.
- Conder, C.R.; Kitchener, H. H. (1882). The Survey of Western Palestine: Memoirs of the Topography, Orography, Hydrography, and Archaeology. Vol. 2. London: Committee of the Palestine Exploration Fund.
- Department of Statistics (1945). Village Statistics, April, 1945. Government of Palestine.
- Guérin, V. (1869). Description Géographique Historique et Archéologique de la Palestine (in French). Vol. 1: Judee, pt. 2. Paris: L'Imprimerie Nationale.
- Hadawi, S. (1970). Village Statistics of 1945: A Classification of Land and Area ownership in Palestine. Palestine Liberation Organization Research Center.
- Hartmann, M. (1883). "Die Ortschaftenliste des Liwa Jerusalem in dem türkischen Staatskalender für Syrien auf das Jahr 1288 der Flucht (1871)". Zeitschrift des Deutschen Palästina-Vereins. 6: 102–149.
- Hütteroth, W.-D.; Abdulfattah, K. (1977). Historical Geography of Palestine, Transjordan and Southern Syria in the Late 16th Century. Erlanger Geographische Arbeiten, Sonderband 5. Erlangen, Germany: Vorstand der Fränkischen Geographischen Gesellschaft. ISBN 3-920405-41-2.
- Khalidi, W. (1992). All That Remains: The Palestinian Villages Occupied and Depopulated by Israel in 1948. Washington D.C.: Institute for Palestine Studies. ISBN 0-88728-224-5.
- Mills, E., ed. (1932). Census of Palestine 1931. Population of Villages, Towns and Administrative Areas. Jerusalem: Government of Palestine.
- Morris, B. (2004). The Birth of the Palestinian Refugee Problem Revisited. Cambridge University Press. ISBN 978-0-521-00967-6.
- Palmer, E. H. (1881). The Survey of Western Palestine: Arabic and English Name Lists Collected During the Survey by Lieutenants Conder and Kitchener, R. E. Transliterated and Explained by E.H. Palmer. Committee of the Palestine Exploration Fund.
- Robinson, E.; Smith, E. (1841). Biblical Researches in Palestine, Mount Sinai and Arabia Petraea: A Journal of Travels in the year 1838. Vol. 3. Boston: Crocker & Brewster.
- Socin, A. (1879). "Alphabetisches Verzeichniss von Ortschaften des Paschalik Jerusalem". Zeitschrift des Deutschen Palästina-Vereins. 2: 135–163.
