= Vardon =

Community settlement in south-central Israel

Vardon: ורדון (Hebrew); فردون (Arabic)
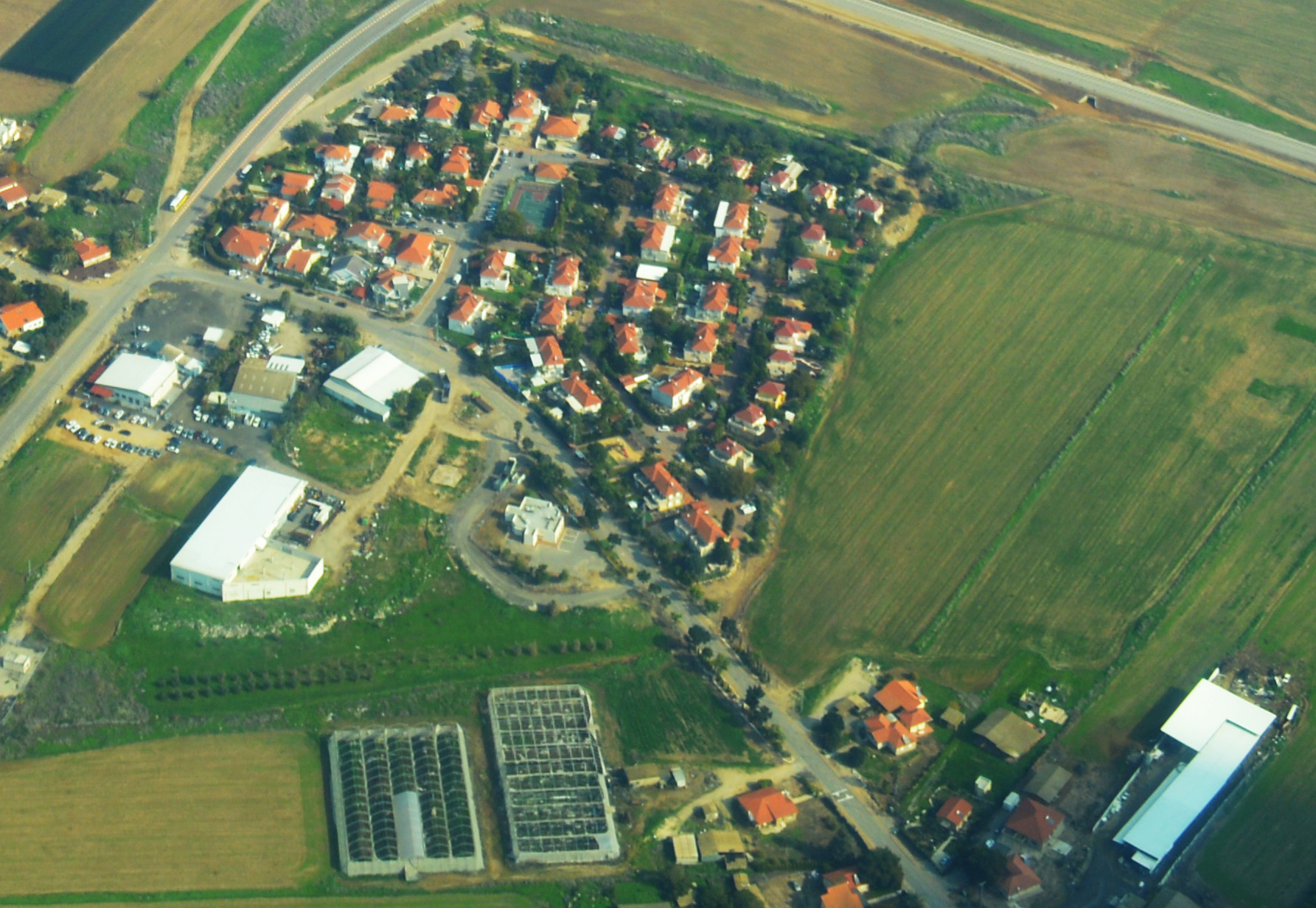

- Location within Ashkelon region of Israel
- Coordinates: 31°39′47″N 34°46′49″E
- Country: Israel
- District: Southern
- Subdistrict: Ashkelon
- Council: Yoav
- Affiliation: Kibbutz Movement
- Founded: 1964
- Population (2024): 295

Vardon (Hebrew: ורדון) is a community settlement in south-central Israel. Located north of Kiryat Gat and south of Kiryat Malakhi, it falls under the jurisdiction of Yoav Regional Council. In 2024 it had a population of 295.

== History ==
It was founded in 1964 as a village center and became a communal village in 1998. It was founded on the land of the Arab villages of Summil and Jusayr, both of which were depopulated in the 1948 Arab–Israeli War.

The name of the community is a loose translation for the family of Julius Rosenwald who was a Jewish donor from the United States. ("Vardon" is derived from vered, which means "rose", hence Rosenfeld.

== Education ==
Vardon, being a small community, has no schools, so it relies on schools of the Yoav Regional Council and the surrounding communities. The residents may go to either secular or religious schools. The elementary schools are "Sdot Yoav" in kibbutz Gat and "Yad Hazon" in Be'er Tuvia. High schools are "Tzafit" in Kfar Menahem and "Gruss" in Kiryat Gat.

== Facilities ==
In Vardon there is a youth center, a sports field, public gardens, playgrounds, and a regional infirmary.
