= Jilya =

Jilya جِليا
- Village
- Etymology: probably from Gallaa
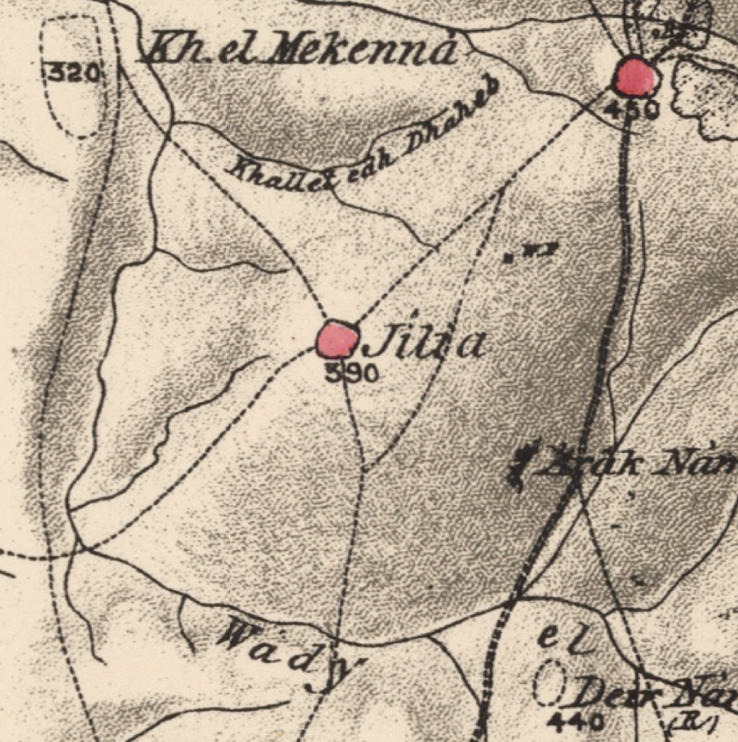
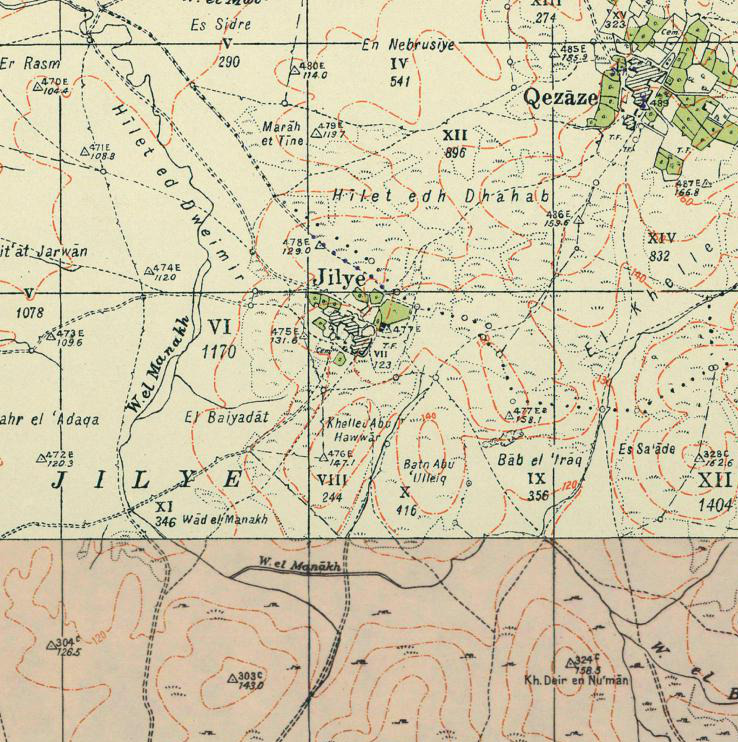
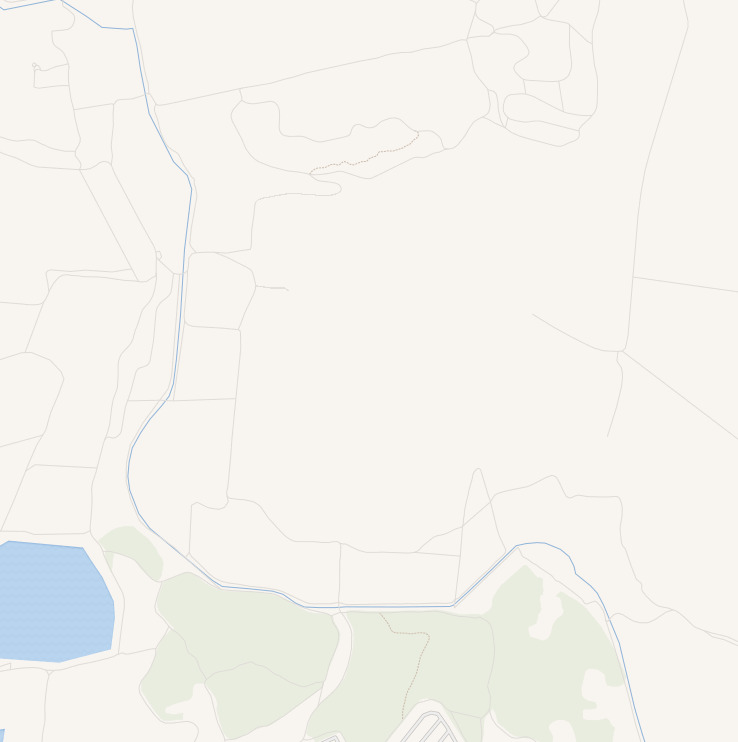
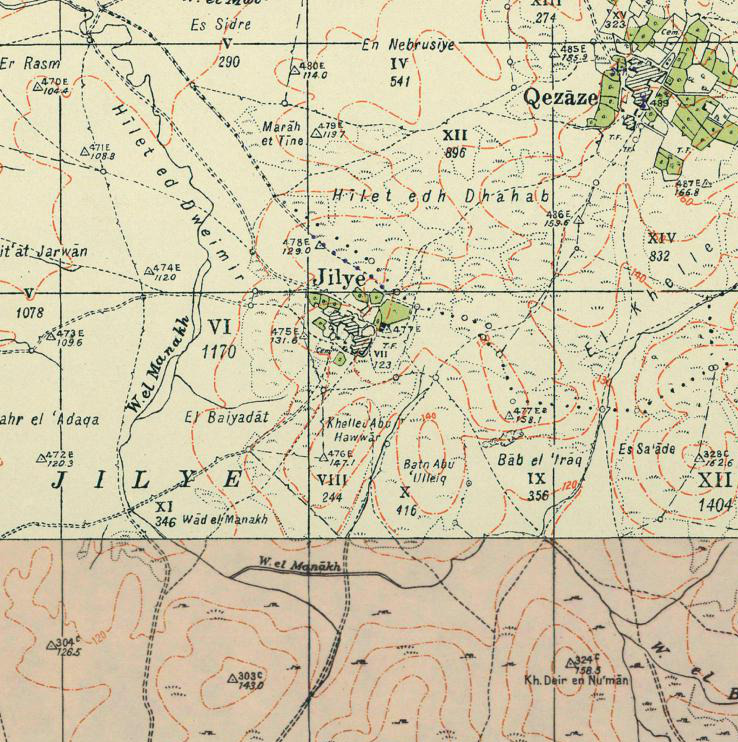
- 1870s map 1940s map modern map 1940s with modern overlay map A series of historical maps of the area around Jilya (click the buttons)

- Location within Mandatory Palestine
- Coordinates: 31°46′06″N 34°51′52″E
- Palestine grid: 137/130
- Geopolitical entity: Mandatory Palestine
- Subdistrict: Ramle
- Date of depopulation: July 9–10, 1948

Population (1945)
  - Total: 330
- Cause(s) of depopulation: Influence of nearby town's fall

Jilya was a Palestinian Arab village in the Ramle Subdistrict of Mandatory Palestine. The Romans referred to it as Jilya by Galla. It was depopulated during the 1948 Arab–Israeli War by the Givati Brigade of the first stage of Operation Dani on July 9, 1948. It was located 17 km south of Ramla.

== History ==
The PEF's Survey of Western Palestine (SWP) thought that Jilya was the Gallaa of the Onomasticon, mentioned as a town near Accaron.

=== Ottoman era ===
Jilya, like all of Palestine was incorporated into the Ottoman Empire in 1517. In the 1596 tax registers, it was listed as an entirely Muslim village, located in the nahiya of Gazza in the liwa of Gazza, with a population of 17 families; an estimated population of 94. The inhabitants paid a fixed tax rate of 33,3% on agricultural products, including wheat, barley, summer crops, vineyards, goats and beehives, in addition to occasional revenues; a total of 2,200 akçe.

In 1882 the SWP described it as "an ordinary village of adobe and stone."

=== British Mandate era ===
In the 1922 census of Palestine, conducted by the British Mandate authorities, Jilia had a population of 269, all Muslims, increasing slightly in the 1931 census to 271 Muslims, in 63 houses.

In the 1945 statistics, the population had increased to 330 Muslims, while the total land area was 10,347 dunams, according to an official land and population survey. Of this, a total of 7,677 dunums of village land was used for cereals, 40 dunums were irrigated or used for plantations, while 7 dunams were classified as built-up areas.

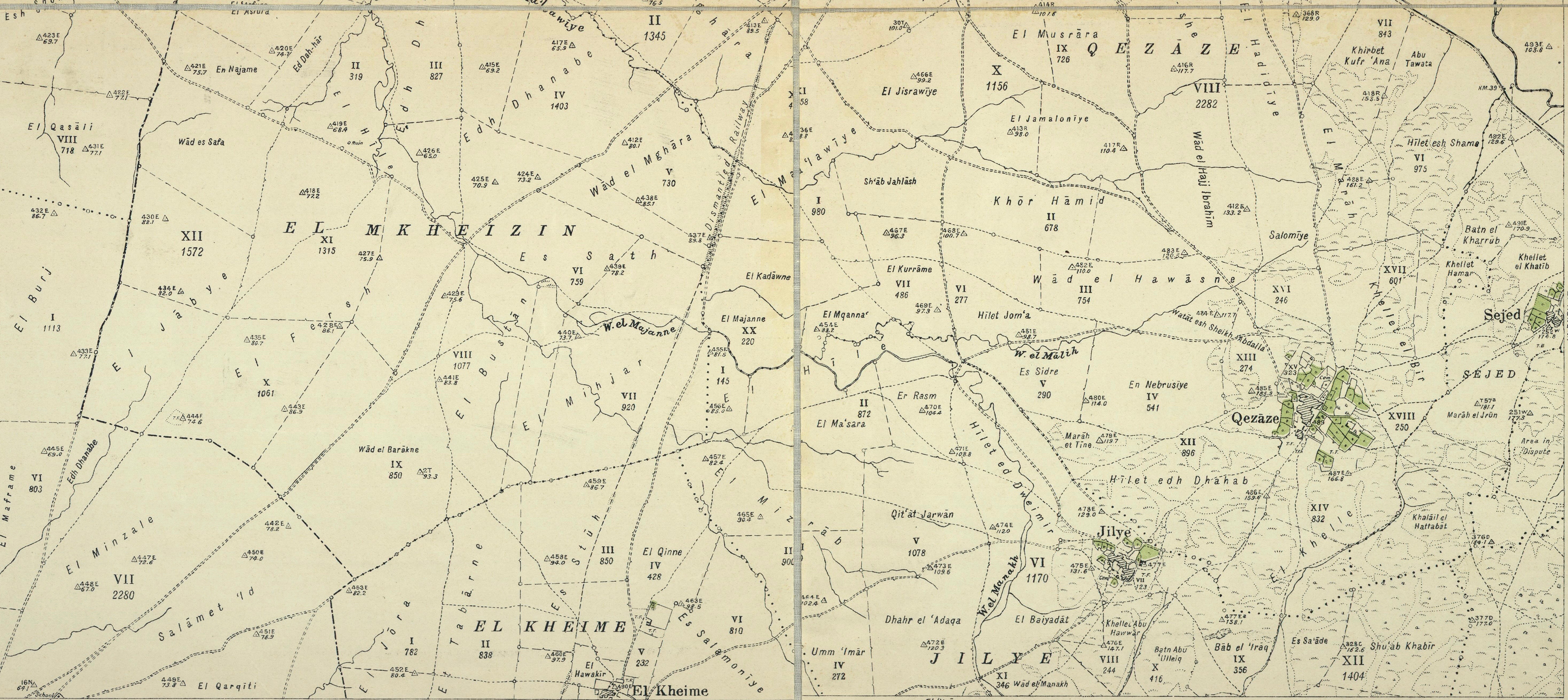
Jilya (Jilye) 1930 1:20,000

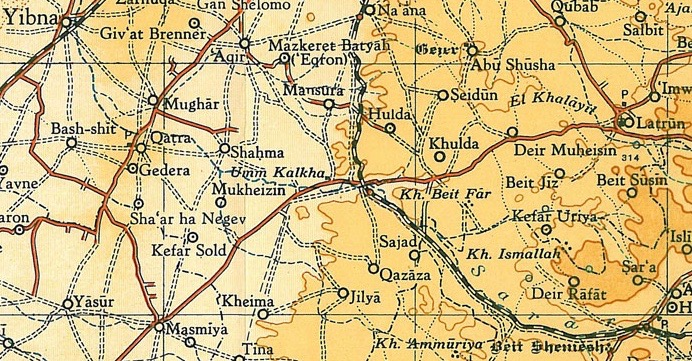
Jilya 1945 1:250,000

=== 1948, aftermath ===
Jilya was depopulated on July 9–10, 1948. On 16 July 1948, during Operation An-Far, Givati HQ informed General Staff\Operations that "our forces have entered the villages of Qazaza, Kheima, Jilya, Idnibba, Mughallis, expelled the inhabitants, [and] blown up and torched a number of houses. The area is at the moment clear of Arabs." On the July 19th, refugees near Jilya were warned by Israeli forces that they would be killed if they tried to return to their village.

In 1992 it was noted about the village site: "The area is fenced in and inaccessible".

== Bibliography ==
- Barron, J.B., ed. (1923). Palestine: Report and General Abstracts of the Census of 1922. Government of Palestine.
- Conder, C.R.; Kitchener, H.H. (1882). The Survey of Western Palestine: Memoirs of the Topography, Orography, Hydrography, and Archaeology. Vol. 2. London: Committee of the Palestine Exploration Fund.
- Department of Statistics (1945). Village Statistics, April, 1945. Government of Palestine.
- Hadawi, S. (1970). Village Statistics of 1945: A Classification of Land and Area ownership in Palestine. Palestine Liberation Organization Research Center.
- Hütteroth, W.-D.; Abdulfattah, K. (1977). Historical Geography of Palestine, Transjordan and Southern Syria in the Late 16th Century. Erlanger Geographische Arbeiten, Sonderband 5. Erlangen, Germany: Vorstand der Fränkischen Geographischen Gesellschaft. ISBN 3-920405-41-2.
- Khalidi, W. (1992). All That Remains: The Palestinian Villages Occupied and Depopulated by Israel in 1948. Washington D.C.: Institute for Palestine Studies. ISBN 0-88728-224-5.
- Mills, E., ed. (1932). Census of Palestine 1931. Population of Villages, Towns and Administrative Areas. Jerusalem: Government of Palestine.
- Morris, B. (2004). The Birth of the Palestinian Refugee Problem Revisited. Cambridge University Press. ISBN 978-0-521-00967-6.
- Palmer, E.H. (1881). The Survey of Western Palestine: Arabic and English Name Lists Collected During the Survey by Lieutenants Conder and Kitchener, R. E. Transliterated and Explained by E.H. Palmer. Committee of the Palestine Exploration Fund.
