= Qazaza =

Qazaza قزازة Kezazeh, Kerazeh
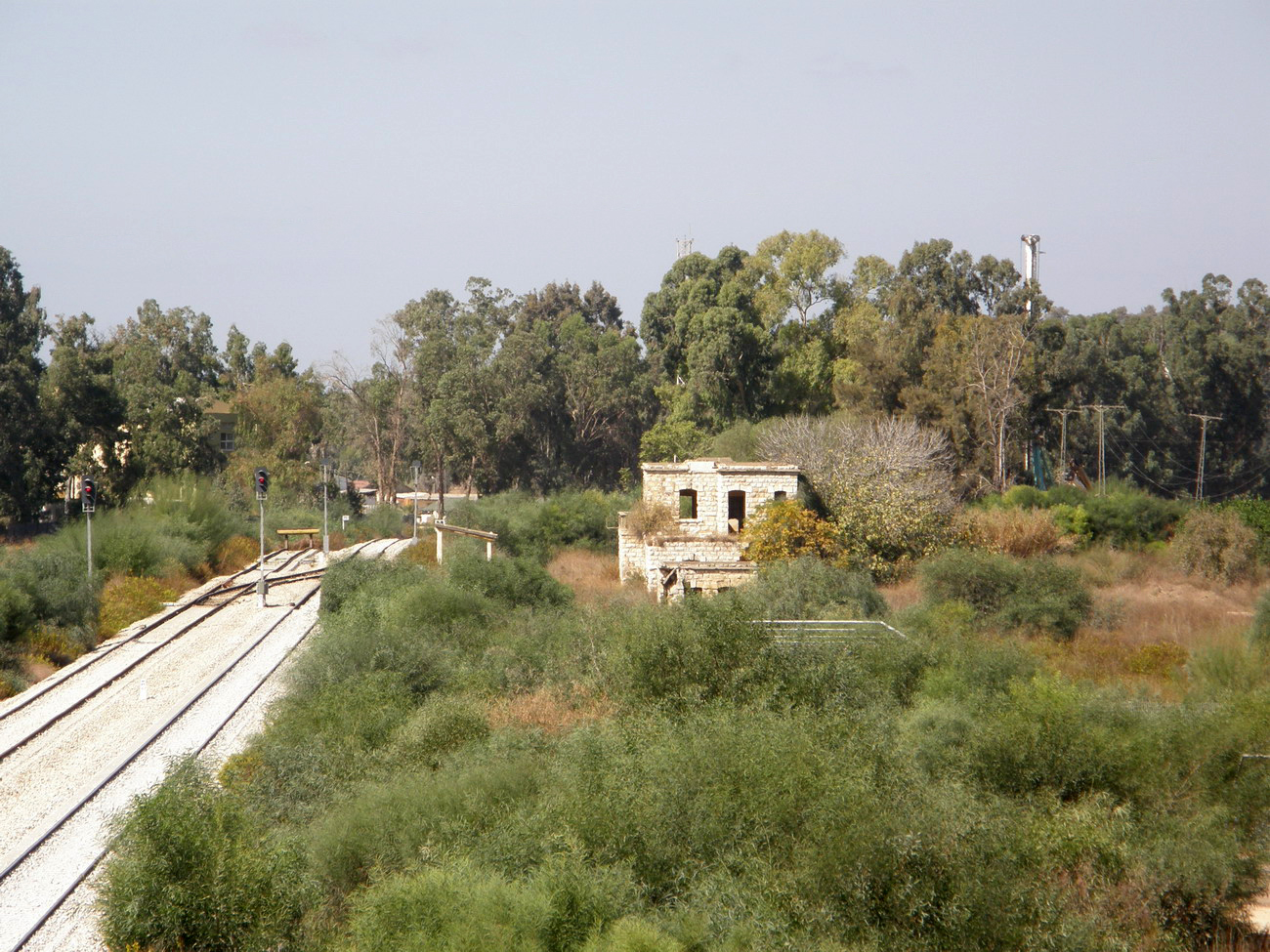
- Remains of the Wadi al-Sarar Railway Station, on the Jaffa–Jerusalem railway line, located 3 km (2 mi) due north of the village.
- Etymology: from personal name
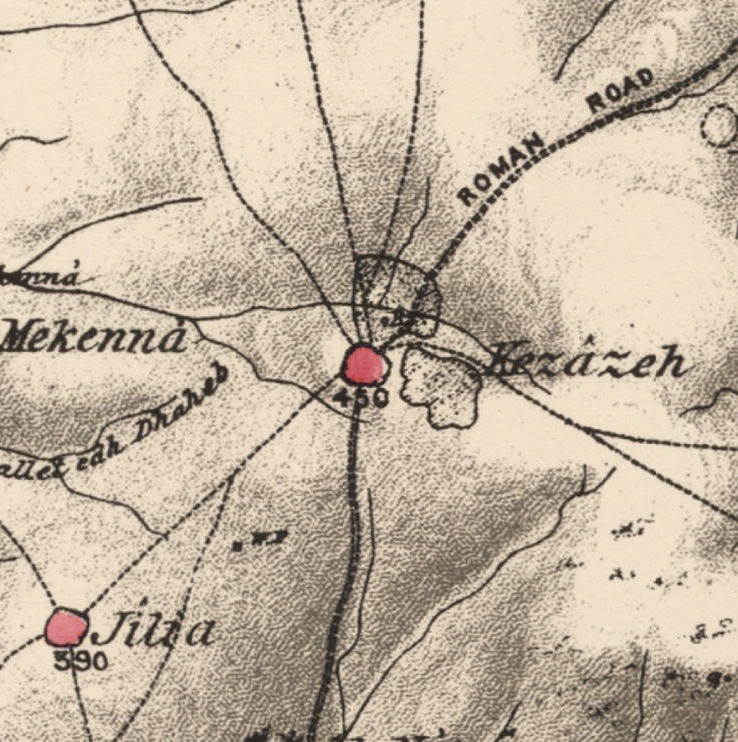
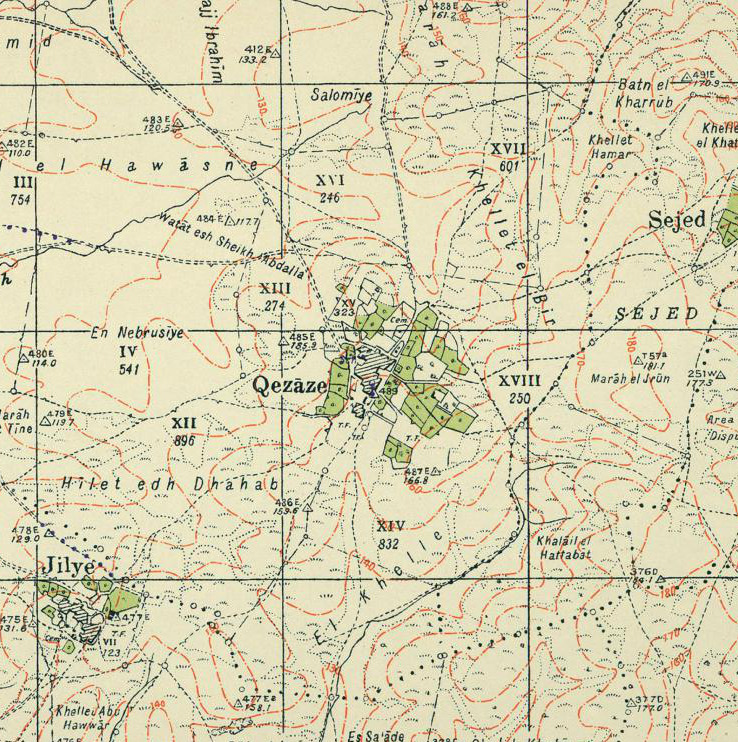
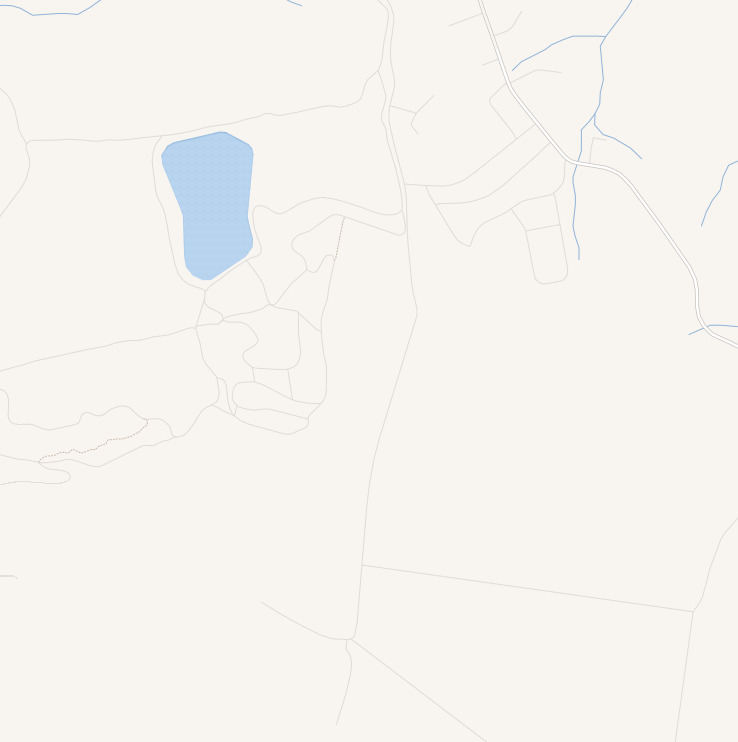
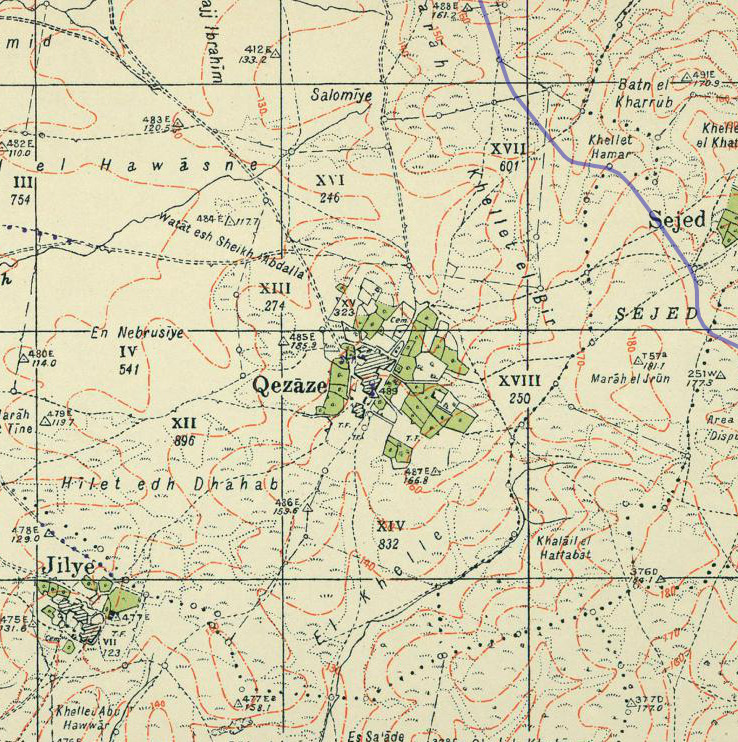
- 1870s map 1940s map modern map 1940s with modern overlay map A series of historical maps of the area around Qazaza (click the buttons)

- Location within Mandatory Palestine
- Coordinates: 31°46′44″N 34°52′34″E
- Palestine grid: 138/131
- Geopolitical entity: Mandatory Palestine
- Subdistrict: Ramle
- Date of depopulation: 9–10 July 1948

Area
  - Total: 18,829 dunams (18.829 km^{2}; 7.270 sq mi)

Population (1945)
  - Total: 940
- Cause(s) of depopulation: Influence of nearby town's fall
- Current Localities: Israel Defense Forces base

Qazaza (Arabic: قزازة) was a Palestinian village in the Ramle Subdistrict of Mandatory Palestine, located 19 kilometers (12 mi) south of Ramla. It was depopulated in 1948.

== History ==
In 1838, in the Ottoman era, el Kuzazeh was noted as Muslim village, in the Er-Ramleh district.

A European traveler reported that he passed Qazaza in the 1860s on his way to examine a nearby tell.

Socin found from an official Ottoman village list from about 1870 that Kezaze had a population of 133, in 89 houses, though the population count included men only. It was also noted that it was located two hours southeast of Shahma. Hartmann found that Kezaze had 85 houses.

In 1882, the PEF's Survey of Western Palestine (SWP) described Kerazeh as "a small village of adobe and stone at the edge of the hills, with gardens and a well."

=== British Mandate era ===
In the 1922 census of Palestine, conducted by the British Mandate authorities, Qezazeh had a population of 472 Muslims, increasing in the 1931 census to 649, still all Muslims, in a total of 150 residential houses.

The villagers maintained a village mosque and some owned shops. An elementary school was first established in Qazaza in 1922. In 1945 Qazaza joined with the villagers of Sajad and Jilya and established a common school for all the three villages. This school had 127 students at the time of its founding in 1945.

The villagers cultivated grain, vegetables and fruits.

In the 1945 statistics the population was 940, all Muslims, while the total land area was 18,829 dunams, according to an official land and population survey. Of this, a total of 11,757 dunums were allocated to cereals, while 131 dunums were irrigated or used for orchards, while 38 dunams were classified as built-up urban areas.

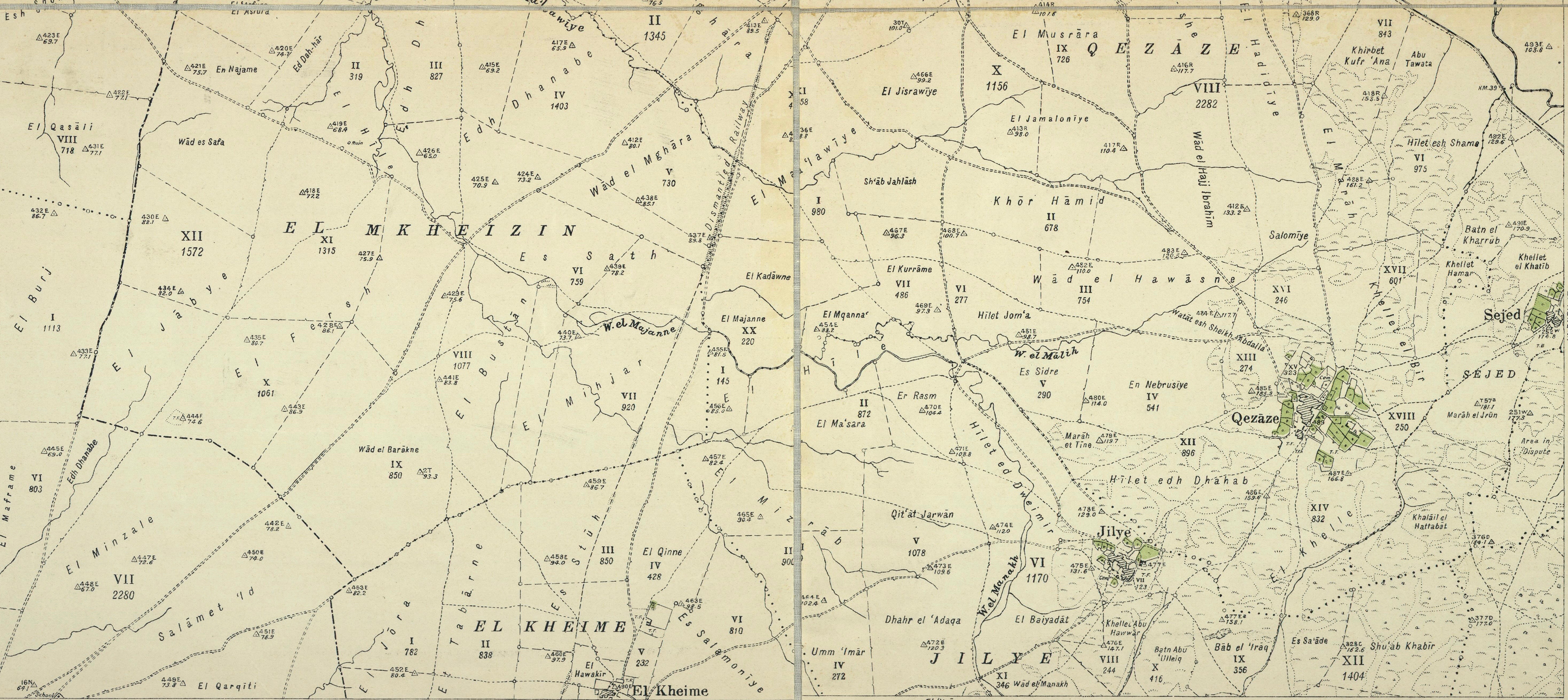
Qazaza 1930 1:20,000

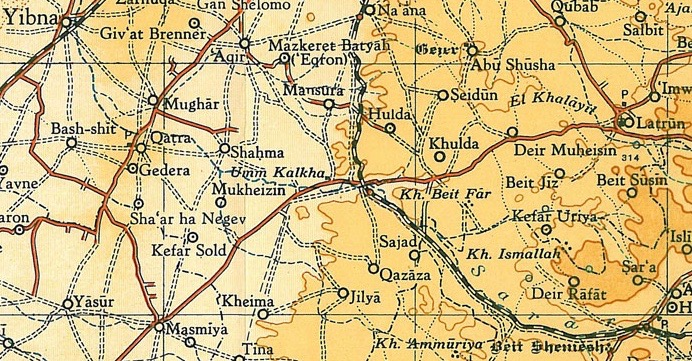
Qazaza 1945 1:250,000

=== 1948 war and aftermath ===
During the countdown to the 1948 Arab–Israeli War, the Haganah was ordered to demolish Arab houses in so-called "retaliatory measures". In this connection, Haganah units partially destroyed the home of the mukhtar of Qazaza, Abdullah Abu Sabah, on the 19 December 1947, in response to the killing of a Jew. Two Arabs were killed during this operation.

On 16 July 1948, Givati HQ informed General Staff\Operations that "our forces have entered the villages of Qazaza, Kheima, Jilya, Idnibba, Mughallis, expelled the inhabitants, [and] blown up and torched a number of houses. The area is at the moment clear of Arabs".

Many of Qazaza's former inhabitants fled to Hebron, forming part of the 1948 Palestinian expulsion and flight.

Today, the village lands are used by the Israel Defense Forces. As a closed military zone, it is not known what became of Qazaza's mosque, its elementary school (which had served the villages of Sajad and Jilya as well) or its more than 150 homes.

== See also ==
- Depopulated Palestinian locations in Israel
- Palestine Railways
- Jaffa–Jerusalem railway

== Bibliography ==
- Barron, J.B., ed. (1923). Palestine: Report and General Abstracts of the Census of 1922. Government of Palestine.
- Conder, C.R.; Kitchener, H.H. (1882). The Survey of Western Palestine: Memoirs of the Topography, Orography, Hydrography, and Archaeology. Vol. 2. London: Committee of the Palestine Exploration Fund.
- Department of Statistics (1945). Village Statistics, April, 1945. Government of Palestine.
- Hadawi, S. (1970). Village Statistics of 1945: A Classification of Land and Area ownership in Palestine. Palestine Liberation Organization Research Center.
- Hartmann, M. (1883). "Die Ortschaftenliste des Liwa Jerusalem in dem türkischen Staatskalender für Syrien auf das Jahr 1288 der Flucht (1871)". Zeitschrift des Deutschen Palästina-Vereins. 6: 102–149.
- Khalidi, W. (1992). All That Remains: The Palestinian Villages Occupied and Depopulated by Israel in 1948. Washington D.C.: Institute for Palestine Studies. ISBN 0-88728-224-5.
- Mansell, A. L. (1863): "A Surveying Trip through the Holy Land." The Nautical Magazine and Naval Chronicle. January Issue:36-40. Cited in Khalidi, 1992.
- Mills, E., ed. (1932). Census of Palestine 1931. Population of Villages, Towns and Administrative Areas. Jerusalem: Government of Palestine.
- Morris, B. (2004). The Birth of the Palestinian Refugee Problem Revisited. Cambridge University Press. ISBN 978-0-521-00967-6.
- Palmer, E.H. (1881). The Survey of Western Palestine: Arabic and English Name Lists Collected During the Survey by Lieutenants Conder and Kitchener, R. E. Transliterated and Explained by E.H. Palmer. Committee of the Palestine Exploration Fund.
- Robinson, E.; Smith, E. (1841). Biblical Researches in Palestine, Mount Sinai and Arabia Petraea: A Journal of Travels in the year 1838. Vol. 3. Boston: Crocker & Brewster.
- Socin, A. (1879). "Alphabetisches Verzeichniss von Ortschaften des Paschalik Jerusalem". Zeitschrift des Deutschen Palästina-Vereins. 2: 135–163.
