= Gefen =

Gefen: גפן (Hebrew)
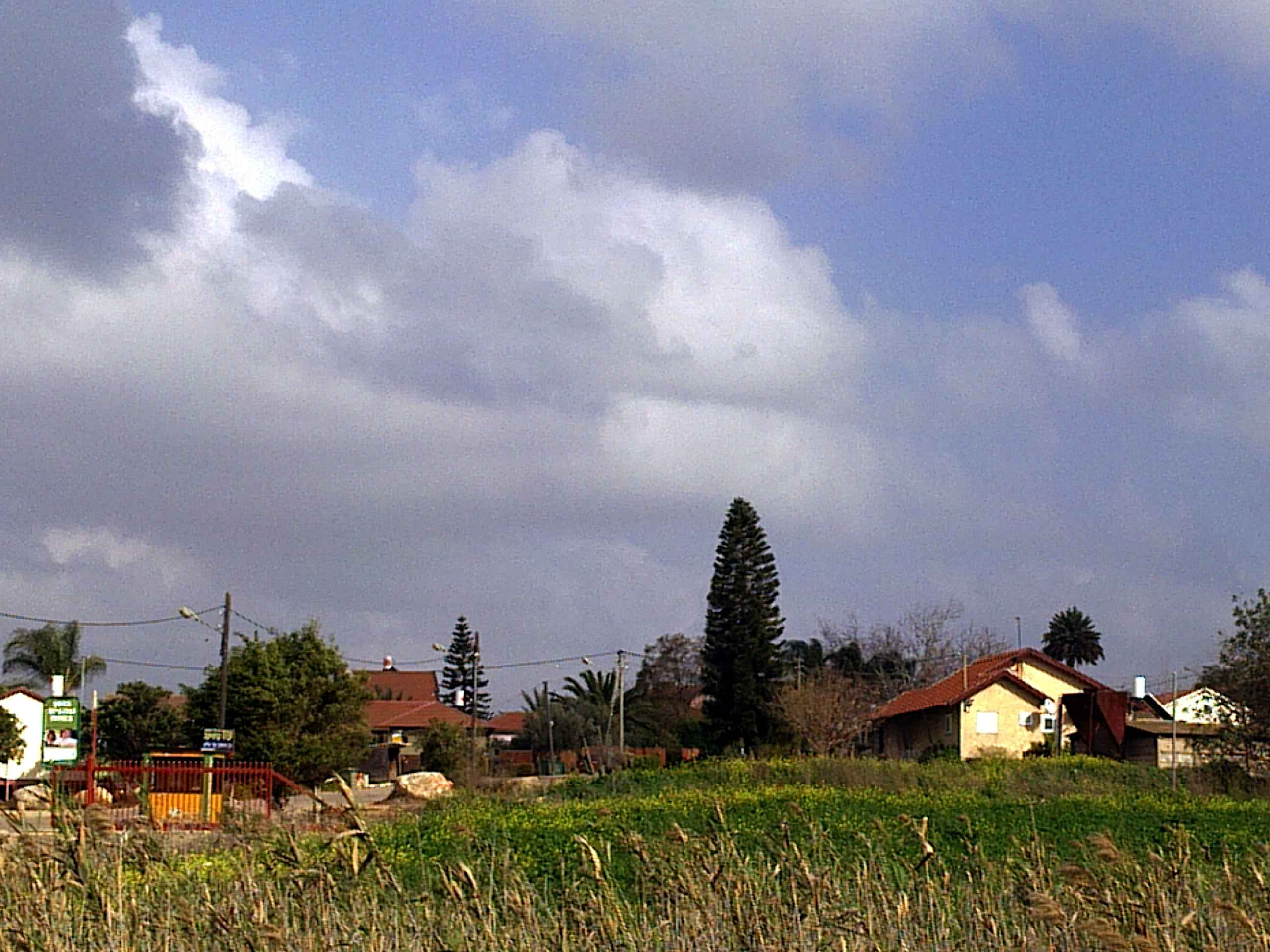

- Location within Jerusalem District
- Coordinates: 31°44′27″N 34°52′42″E
- Country: Israel
- District: Jerusalem
- Council: Mateh Yehuda
- Affiliation: Hapoel HaMizrachi
- Founded: 1955
- Founder: Moroccan Jews
- Population (2024): 422

Gefen (Hebrew: גֶּפֶן, lit. 'Grapevine') is a moshav in central Israel. Located between Beit Shemesh and Kiryat Malakhi, it falls under the jurisdiction of Mateh Yehuda Regional Council. In 2024 it had a population of 422.

== History ==
The village was established in 1955 by Jewish immigrants from Morocco. The chosen site had previously belonged to the depopulated Arab village of Mughallis before the 1948 Arab-Israeli War.

The name is taken from Psalm 80:15: "God Almighty, look down from heaven and see; watch over this grapevine."
