= Al-Tina =

Al-Tina التينة
- Etymology: The fig tree
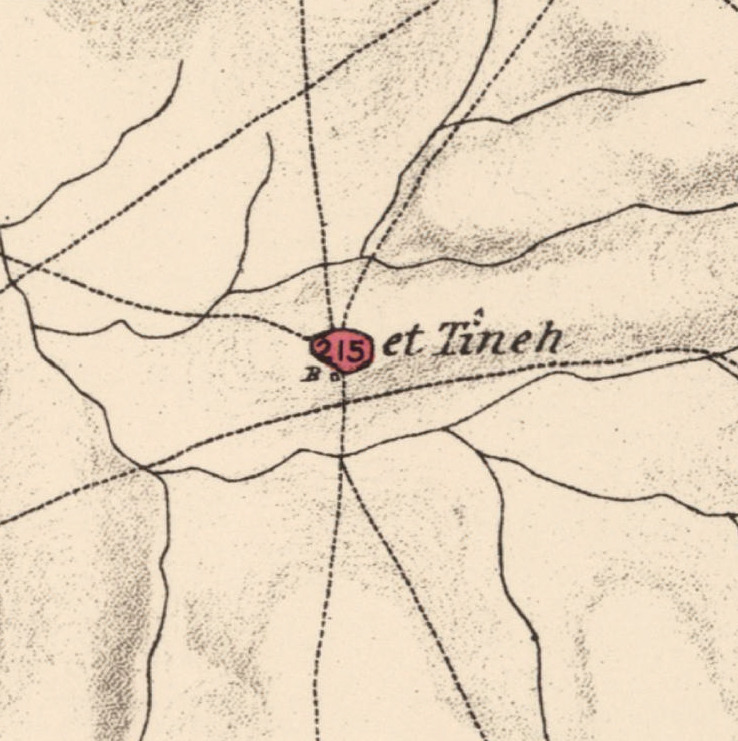
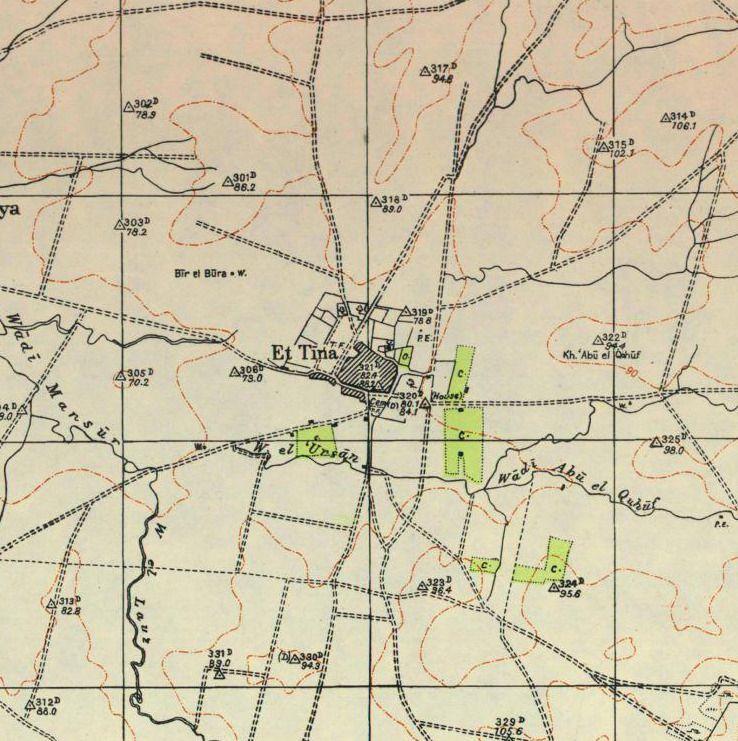
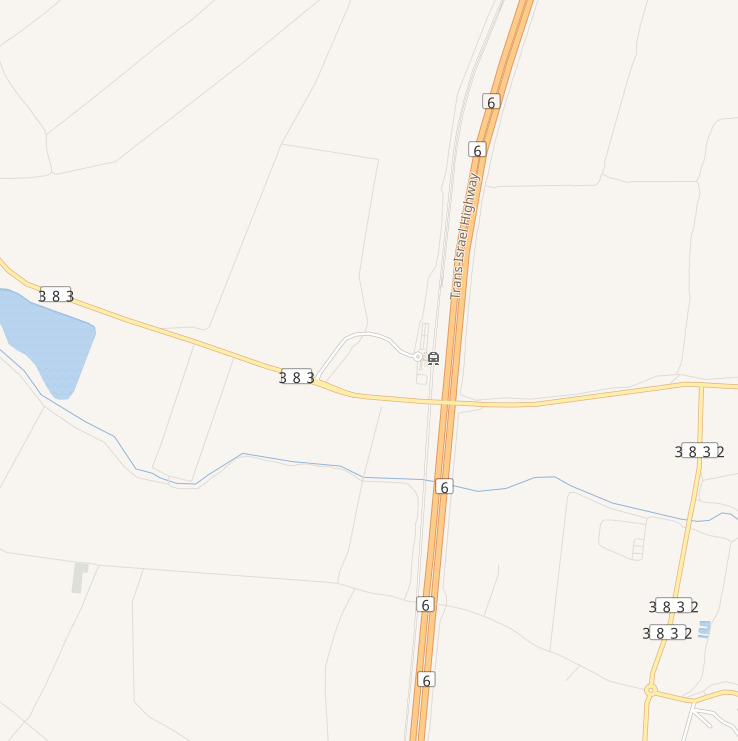
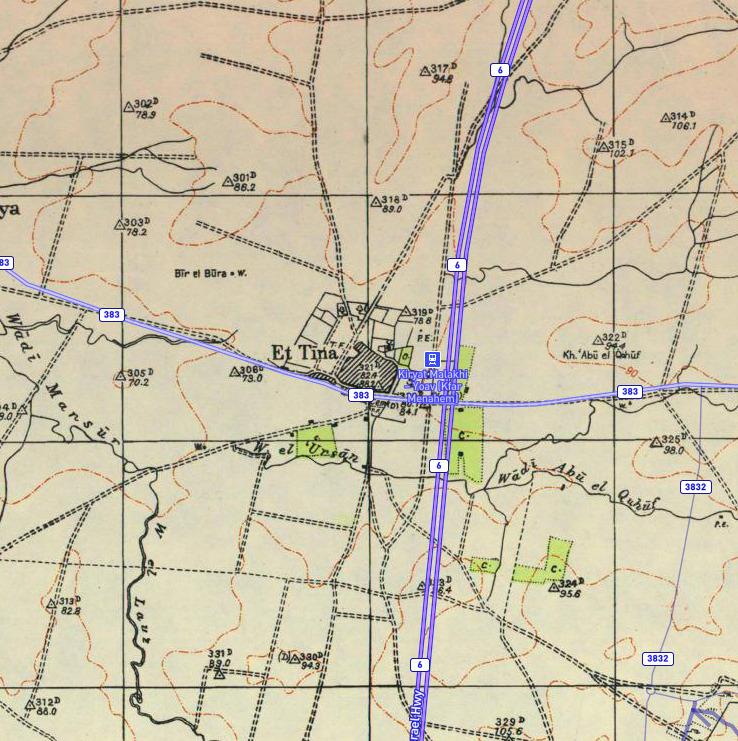
- 1870s map 1940s map modern map 1940s with modern overlay map A series of historical maps of the area around Al-Tina (click the buttons)

- Location within Mandatory Palestine
- Coordinates: 31°44′48″N 34°49′11″E
- Palestine grid: 133/128
- Geopolitical entity: Mandatory Palestine
- Subdistrict: Ramle
- Date of depopulation: July 8–9, 1948

Area
  - Total: 7,001 dunams (7.001 km^{2}; 2.703 sq mi)

Population (1945)
  - Total: 750
- Cause(s) of depopulation: Military assault by Yishuv forces

Al-Tina, or Khirbet et-Tineh was a Palestinian Arab village in the Ramle Subdistrict of Mandatory Palestine. The village was located between the Shfela and southern Israeli coastal plain. It was depopulated during the 1948 Arab–Israeli War on July 8, 1948, by the Givati Brigade under Operation An-Far. It was located 20. km south of Ramla. The hill on which the village was built stands today next to the Kiryat Mal'akhi – Yoav railway station and next to Highway 6. Archeological excavations at the site revealed the remains of a Byzantine settlement.

== History ==
Based on the archaeological excavation in the eastern foot of the hill on which the village used to stand, a settlement was established in the site as early as the Byzantine era. Pottery, glassware and coins allowed the researchers to date this settlement to a short period between roughly 375 to 425 CE. The excavation has revealed remains of what may be a storehouse, with many broken wine jars. The structure included a drainage system that collected water from its roof to somewhere beyond the excavation limits. The region is abundant with water and thus the hill serves as a good place for settlement. Elie Haddad who headed the excavation suggested that this abundance of water is hinted in the name of the village, "the fig tree", as it requires a large supply of water to grow. The identity of the Byzantine inhabitants remains unknown and based on the study, the site remained unsettled until the Ottoman period.

Al-Tina was incorporated into the Ottoman Empire in 1517 with all of Palestine, and in 1596 it appeared in the tax registers under the name of Safiriyya, as being in the nahiya ("subdistrict") of Gaza, which was part of Gaza Sanjak. It had a population of 10 households; an estimated 55 persons, who were all Muslims. They paid a fixed tax-rate of 25% on agricultural products, including wheat, barley, summer crops, sesame, fruit trees, goats and beehives, in addition to occasional revenues; a total of 4,350 akçe.

In 1838, it was noted as a Muslim village, el Letineh, in the Gaza District. In 1851–52, van de Velde noted many old stone laying about the village.

In 1863 Victor Guérin found a population is four hundred souls. He further noted some antique stones which were scattered in the cemetery or have been placed around the opening of the well.

An Ottoman village list from about 1870 showed that tine had 96 houses and a population of 277, though the population count included men, only.

In 1882, the PEF's Survey of Western Palestine (SWP) described it as an ordinary adobe village, with a well to the south.

=== British Mandate era ===
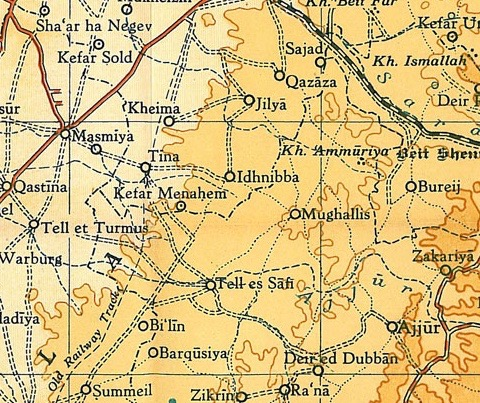
Al-Tina 1945 1:250,000

In the 1922 census of Palestine conducted by the British Mandate authorities, Tineh had a population of 396, all Muslims, increasing in the 1931 census to 530, still all Muslims, in a total of 131 houses.

'Abd al-Fattah Humud (1933–1968), one of the founding members of Fatah, was born in the village.

In the 1945 statistics the village had a population of 750 Muslims, with 7,001 dunams of land. Of this, 141 dunams were used for citrus and bananas, 5,639 for cereals, while 24 dunams were classified as built-up areas.

An elementary school was founded in 1946 and it had an initial enrollment of 67 students.

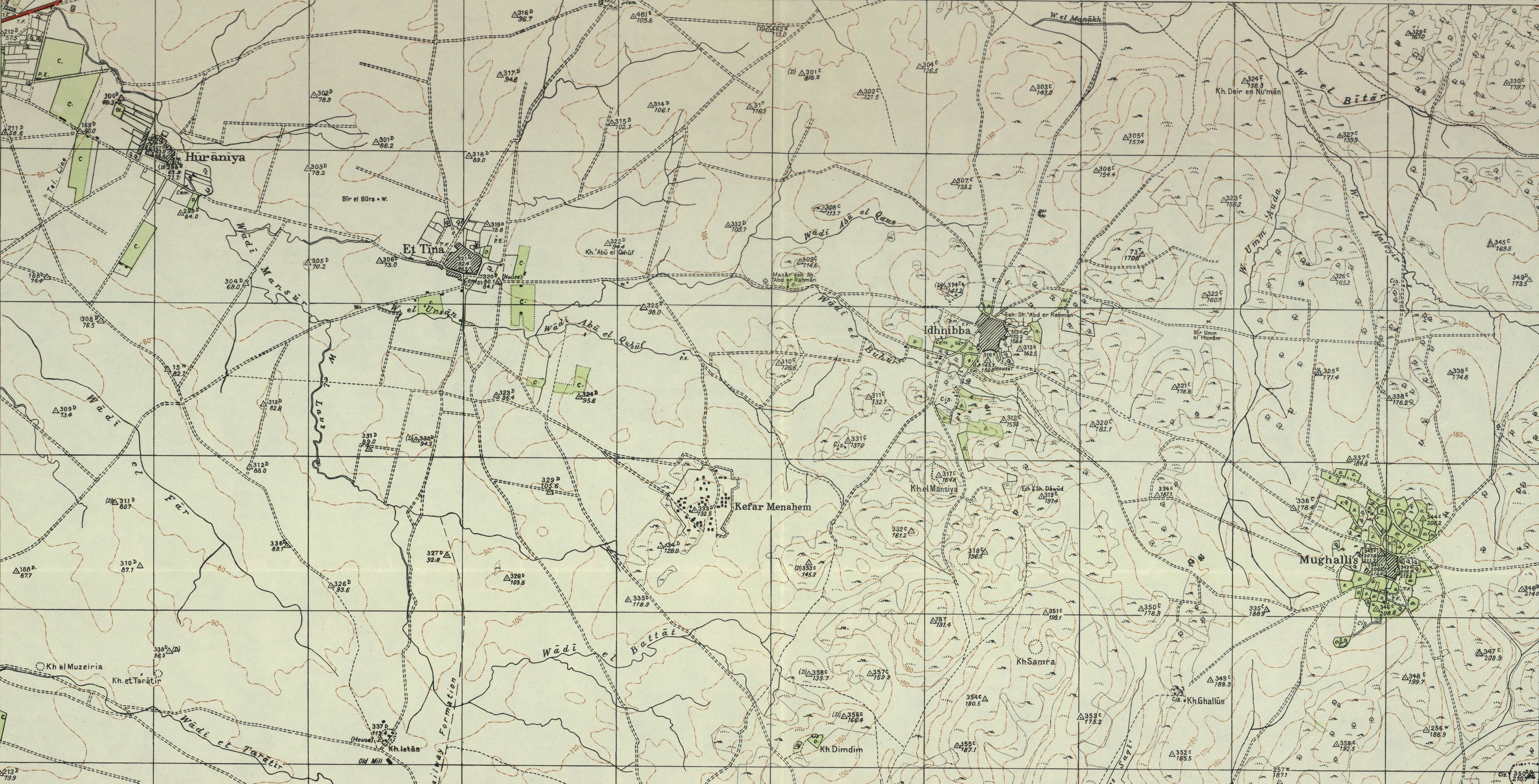
Al-Tina 1948 1:20,000

=== 1948 and aftermath ===
Al-Tina was depopulated during the 1948 Arab–Israeli War on July 8, 1948, by the Givati Brigade under Operation An-Far.

In 1992 the village site was described: "The village has been completely effaced. Next to the site is a wide area, overgrown with bushes and thorns, that is fenced in on the southern side. An orange grove is planted on the northern and western edges of the site. A highway that runs east-west passes to the south, and a railway line passes by about 100 meters to the east."

In July–August 2016 a trial excavation took place in the eastern side of the hill. It was the first archaeological excavation in the site and was headed by Elie Haddad on behalf of the Israel Antiquities Authority. The excavation took place ahead of the construction of an access road to the Kiryat Mal'akhi – Yoav railway station which was under construction at the time. 9 excavation squares were opened.

== Bibliography ==
- Barron, J.B., ed. (1923). Palestine: Report and General Abstracts of the Census of 1922. Government of Palestine.
- Conder, C.R.; Kitchener, H.H. (1882). The Survey of Western Palestine: Memoirs of the Topography, Orography, Hydrography, and Archaeology. Vol. 2. London: Committee of the Palestine Exploration Fund.
- Government of Palestine, Department of Statistics (1945). Village Statistics, April, 1945.
- Guérin, V. (1869). Description Géographique Historique et Archéologique de la Palestine (in French). Vol. 1: Judee, pt. 2. Paris: L'Imprimerie Nationale.
- Hadawi, S. (1970). Village Statistics of 1945: A Classification of Land and Area ownership in Palestine. Palestine Liberation Organization Research Center. Archived from the original on 2018-12-08.
- Hartmann, M. (1883). "Die Ortschaftenliste des Liwa Jerusalem in dem türkischen Staatskalender für Syrien auf das Jahr 1288 der Flucht (1871)". Zeitschrift des Deutschen Palästina-Vereins. 6: 102–149.
- Hütteroth, W.-D.; Abdulfattah, K. (1977). Historical Geography of Palestine, Transjordan and Southern Syria in the Late 16th Century. Erlanger Geographische Arbeiten, Sonderband 5. Erlangen, Germany: Vorstand der Fränkischen Geographischen Gesellschaft. ISBN 3-920405-41-2.
- Khalidi, W. (1992). All That Remains: The Palestinian Villages Occupied and Depopulated by Israel in 1948. Washington D.C.: Institute for Palestine Studies. ISBN 0-88728-224-5.
- Mills, E., ed. (1932). Census of Palestine 1931. Population of Villages, Towns and Administrative Areas. Jerusalem: Government of Palestine.
- Morris, B. (2004). The Birth of the Palestinian Refugee Problem Revisited. Cambridge University Press. ISBN 978-0-521-00967-6.
- Palmer, E.H. (1881). The Survey of Western Palestine: Arabic and English Name Lists Collected During the Survey by Lieutenants Conder and Kitchener, R. E. Transliterated and Explained by E.H. Palmer. Committee of the Palestine Exploration Fund.
- Robinson, E.; Smith, E. (1841). Biblical Researches in Palestine, Mount Sinai and Arabia Petraea: A Journal of Travels in the year 1838. Vol. 3. Boston: Crocker & Brewster.
- Socin, A. (1879). "Alphabetisches Verzeichniss von Ortschaften des Paschalik Jerusalem". Zeitschrift des Deutschen Palästina-Vereins. 2: 135–163.
- Velde, van de, C.W.M. (1854). Narrative of a journey through Syria and Palestine in 1851 and 1852. Vol. 2. William Blackwood and son.
