= Al-Khayma =

Al-Khayma الخيمة
- Village
- Etymology: The Tent
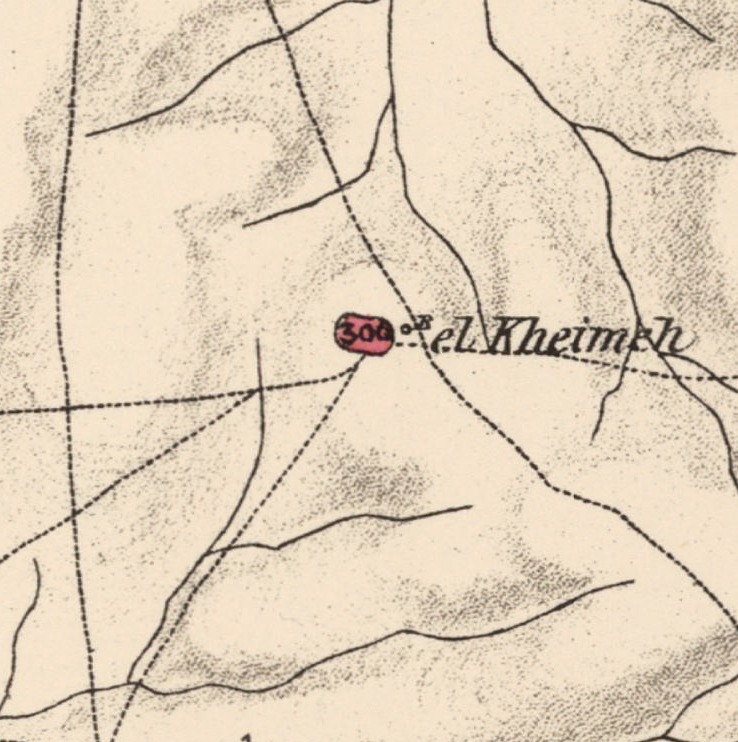
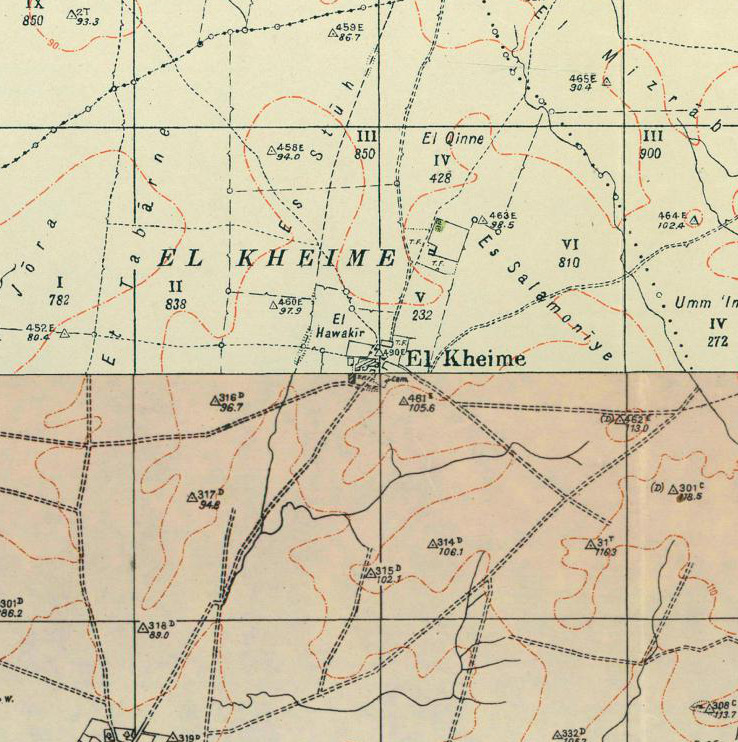
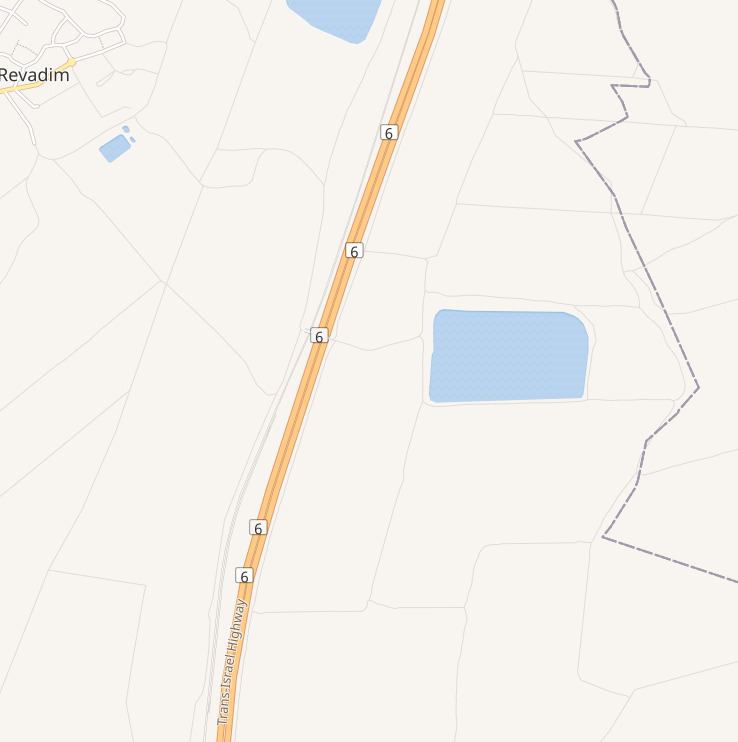
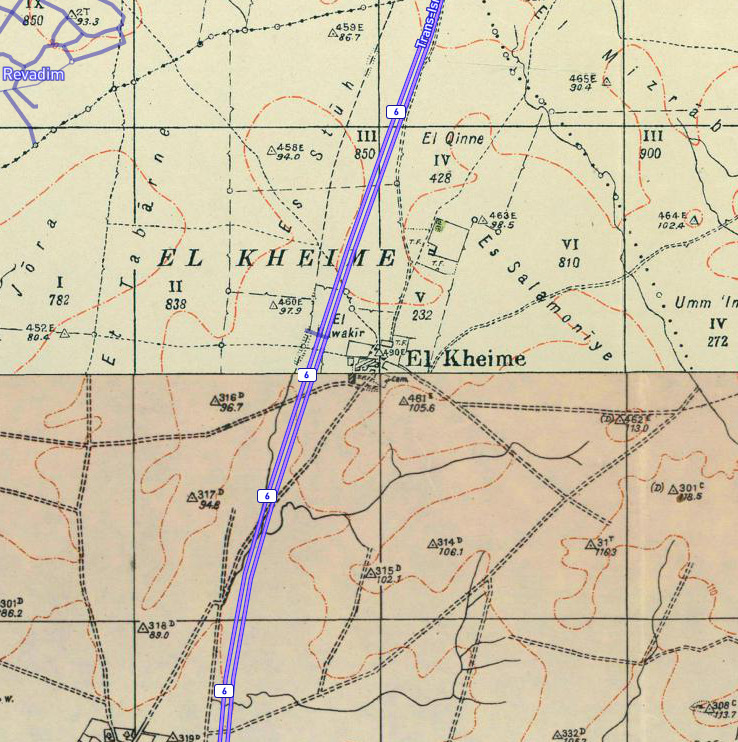
- 1870s map 1940s map modern map 1940s with modern overlay map A series of historical maps of the area around Al-Khayma (click the buttons)

- Location within Mandatory Palestine
- Coordinates: 31°45′44″N 34°49′47″E
- Palestine grid: 133/130
- Geopolitical entity: Mandatory Palestine
- Subdistrict: Ramle
- Date of depopulation: Not known

Area
  - Total: 5,150 dunams (5.15 km^{2}; 1.99 sq mi)

Population (1945)
  - Total: 190

Al-Khayma (Arabic: الخيمة) was a Palestinian Arab village in the Ramle Subdistrict of Mandatory Palestine. It was depopulated during the 1948 Arab–Israeli War on July 9, 1948, by the Givati Brigade of Operation An-Far. It was located 18.5 km south of Ramla.

== History ==
In 1863, Victor Guérin found that it had two hundred and fifty inhabitants.

In 1882, the PEF's Survey of Western Palestine noted it as principally an adobe village of "on low ground", and with a well to the east.

=== British Mandate era ===
In the 1922 census of Palestine, conducted by the British Mandate authorities, Khaimeh had a population of 132 Muslims, increasing in the 1931 census to 141 Muslims, in 30 houses.

In the 1945 statistics, the village had a population of 190, all Muslim, and the total land area was 5,150 dunums. Of this, 4 dunams were irrigated or used for plantations, 5,007 were used for cereals, while 9 dunams were classified as built-up urban areas.

=== 1948 and aftermath ===
Morris list both date and reason for depopulation as "not known". However, he also notes it in connection with Operation An-Far, in mid July 1948.

Following the 1948 war, the area was incorporated into the State of Israel and in August 1948 al-Khaymas was one of 21 Palestinian villages whose land was proposed for resettlement with an Israeli village named Revadim. In November, 1948, the proposal to establish Revadim on al-Khayma's land was passed.

Revadim was eventually established close to village land, according to Morris, however, according to Khalidi, Revadim is located north of al-Khayma, on the land of the depopulated Palestinian village of al-Mukhayzin.

In 1992 the village site was described: "All that remains of the village are three mounds to the east, west, and south of the site that contain the remnants of houses. A girder protrudes from the eastern mound and there is a large, deserted well at the mounds centre. A large artificial pond lies about 100 m northeast of the site, and there is a monument next to a well about 0.5 km to the north. An inscription on the monument reads: To the eMemory of the Members of Kibbutz Revadim, who Settled on the Land in 1948."

== Bibliography ==
- Barron, J.B., ed. (1923). Palestine: Report and General Abstracts of the Census of 1922. Government of Palestine.
- Conder, C.R.; Kitchener, H. H. (1882). The Survey of Western Palestine: Memoirs of the Topography, Orography, Hydrography, and Archaeology. Vol. 2. London: Committee of the Palestine Exploration Fund.
- Department of Statistics (1945). Village Statistics, April, 1945. Government of Palestine.
- Guérin, V. (1869). Description Géographique Historique et Archéologique de la Palestine. Vol. 1: Judee, pt. 2. Paris, L'Imprimerie Imp.
- Hadawi, S. (1970). Village Statistics of 1945: A Classification of Land and Area ownership in Palestine. Palestine Liberation Organization Research Center. Archived from the original on 2018-12-08.
- Khalidi, W. (1992). All That Remains: The Palestinian Villages Occupied and Depopulated by Israel in 1948. Washington D.C.: Institute for Palestine Studies. ISBN 0-88728-224-5.
- Mills, E., ed. (1932). Census of Palestine 1931. Population of Villages, Towns and Administrative Areas. Jerusalem: Government of Palestine.
- Morris, B. (2004). The Birth of the Palestinian Refugee Problem Revisited. Cambridge University Press. ISBN 978-0-521-00967-6.
- Palmer, E.H. (1881). The Survey of Western Palestine: Arabic and English Name Lists Collected During the Survey by Lieutenants Conder and Kitchener, R. E. Transliterated and Explained by E.H. Palmer. Committee of the Palestine Exploration Fund.
