= Operation An-Far =

Israeli military operation

- Part of the 1948 Arab–Israeli War
Date	8–15 July 1948
Location	Former British Mandate of Palestine
Result	Egyptian victory; Israeli failure to accomplish objectives

Belligerents
Israel	Egypt

Commanders and leaders
(Israel) Nahum Sarig	(Egypt) Ahmed Ali al-Mwawi

Casualties and losses
- 20,000 civilians forced to flee by the Israelis

Operation An-Far (short for Anti-Farouk) was a military operation launched by Israel's Givati Brigade on the night of July 8–9 during the 1948 Arab–Israeli War. Its objectives were to gain control of approaches in southern Judea and block the advance of the Egyptian army. The fighting continued until July 15, and was followed by Operation Death to the Invader.

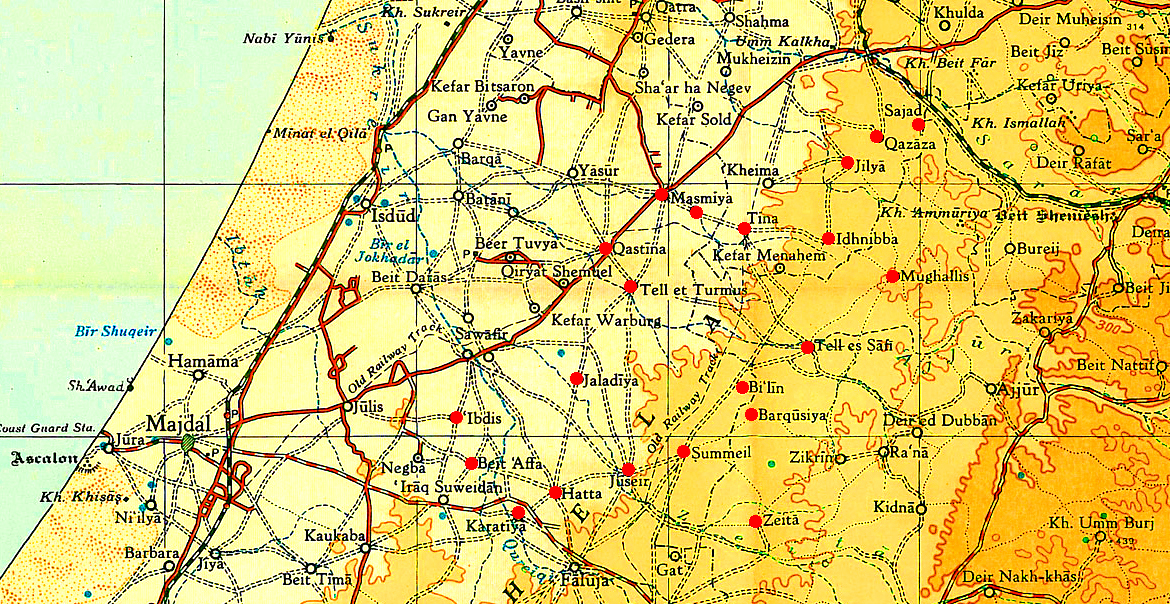
Villages captured during An-Far

== History ==
When the first United Nations Truce ended on July 8, most of the Israeli army's attention and resources were focused on Operations Danny and Dekel. In the south, the Negev and Givati Brigades failed to link up. However, according to Benny Morris, over the course of ten days, the Givati Brigade did succeed in conquering areas in the northern Negev and the western Hebron district foothills.

== Operation ==
Operational Commander Shimon Avidan held meetings at brigade headquarters on July 5 at which plans were outlined. In the first phase, the 1st Battalion was to attack the Tell es-Safi area. The second phase was towards Beit 'Affa, Hatta and Jusayr.

On July 7, the 1st Battalion were given their orders: "to expel the refugees encamped in the area, in order to prevent enemy infiltration from the east to this important position." According to Israeli army reports, the first phase of the operation, in which 16 villages were captured, resulted in "more than 20,000" people fleeing the area.."

The Israelis achieved limited success in the operation, especially in clearing their flanks, but failed to link up with the forces in the Negev desert. This led to the commencement of Operation Death to the Invader on July 16.

== See also ==
- List of battles and operations in the 1948 Palestine war
- Depopulated Palestinian locations in Israel

== Bibliography ==
- Walid Khalidi, All That Remains, ISBN 0-88728-224-5. Uses 1945 'Village Statistics' for population figures.
- Benny Morris, The Birth of the Palestinian refugee problem, 1947–1949, ISBN 0-521-33028-9.
