= Sheydan =

Sheydan or Shidan (Persian: شيدان) may refer to:

- Sheydan, Chaharmahal and Bakhtiari
- Sheydan, Bavanat, Fars Province
- Sheydan, Sepidan, Fars Province
- Shidan, Isfahan
- Sheydan Baraan, Isfahan Province
- Sheydan, West Azerbaijan
- Sheydan, Urmia, West Azerbaijan Province
