= Sidun =

Sidun may refer to:

- Saydun
- Sidun, Iran
