= Dayr Muhaysin =

Dayr Muhaysin دير مُحيسن Umm esh Shukf
- Etymology: the monastery of good deeds
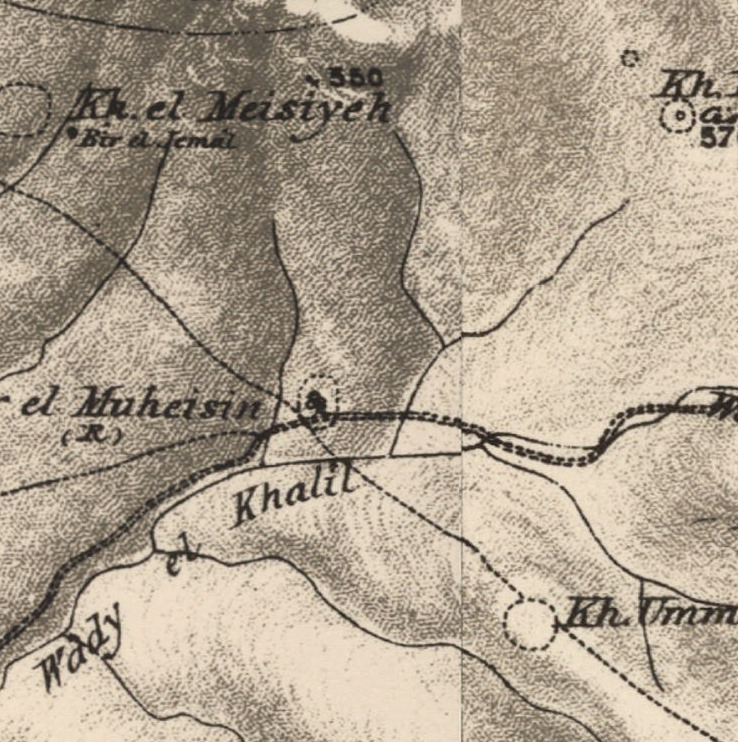
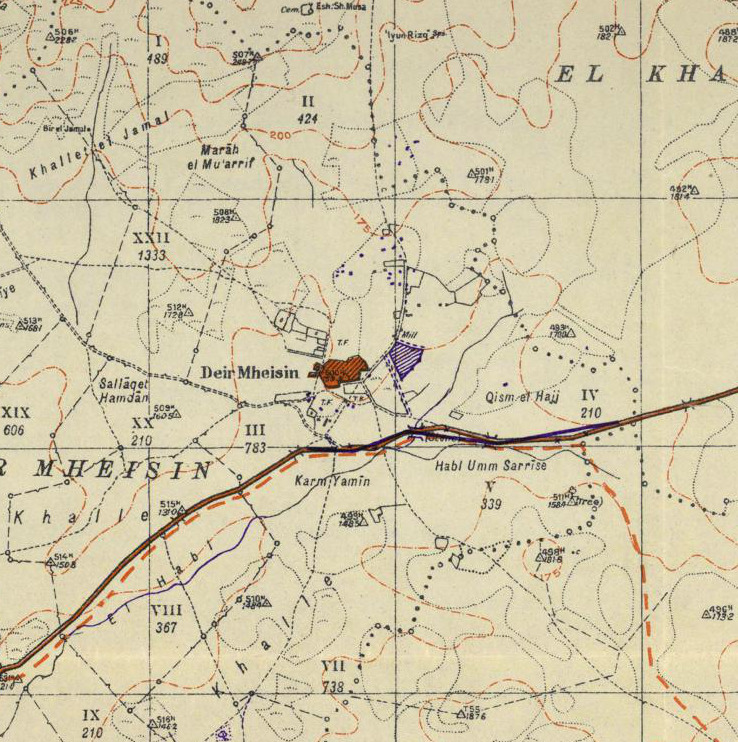
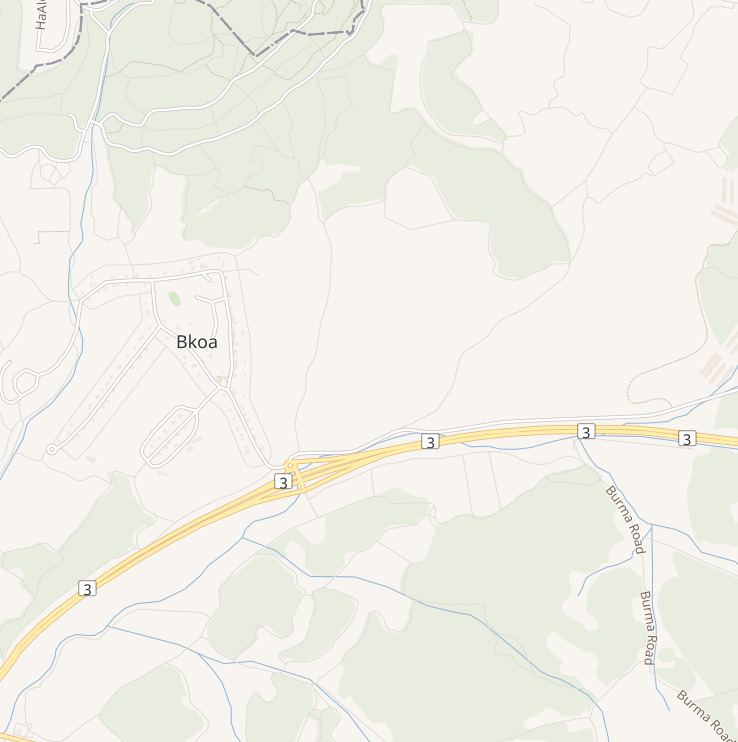
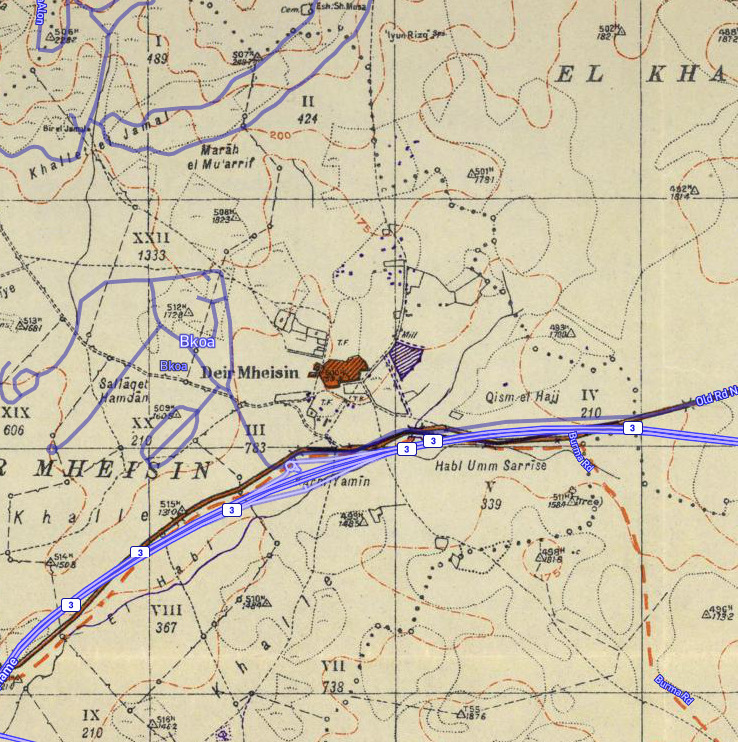
- 1870s map 1940s map modern map 1940s with modern overlay map A series of historical maps of the area around Dayr Muhaysin (click the buttons)

- Location within Mandatory Palestine
- Coordinates: 31°49′42″N 34°56′4″E
- Palestine grid: 143/137
- Geopolitical entity: Mandatory Palestine
- Subdistrict: Ramle
- Date of depopulation: April 6, 1948

Population (1945)
  - Total: 460
- Cause(s) of depopulation: Military assault by Yishuv forces
- Current Localities: Beqoa'

Dayr Muhaysin (Arabic: دير محيسن, Hebrew: דיר מוחיסין) was a Palestinian village in the Ramle Subdistrict of Mandatory Palestine, located 12 km southeast of Ramla and 4 km west of Latrun. It was depopulated during the 1948 Palestine war.

== History ==
It has been suggested by the PEF's Survey of Western Palestine that Dayr Muhaysin was one of the Crusader villages which was given by the 12th century King Baldwin V as a fief to the Church of the Holy Sepulchre.

=== Ottoman era ===
In 1838, it was noted as a Muslim village in the southern part of the Er-Ramleh area.

In 1863, Victor Guérin found a village of some twenty half destroyed and deserted houses, under a large mimosa tree.

The village was mentioned in an official Ottoman village list from around 1870, showing it had 10 houses and a population of 29, though the population count included men only.

In 1883, the "Survey of Western Palestine" found at Dayr Muhaysin: "Traces of a former village; a conspicuous white mound, with cisterns and caves; a large site, also known as Umm esh Shukf."

=== British Mandate era ===
In the 1931 census of Palestine conducted by the British Mandate authorities, Deir Muheisin had a population of 113; all Muslims, in a total of 28 houses.

In the 1945 statistics, the village had a population of 460 Muslims, while the total land area was 10,008 dunams (equivalent to the Greek stremma or English/American acre), according to an official land and population survey. Of this, 45 dunams were plantations or irrigated, 7,909 for cereals, while 72 dunams were classified as built-up public areas.

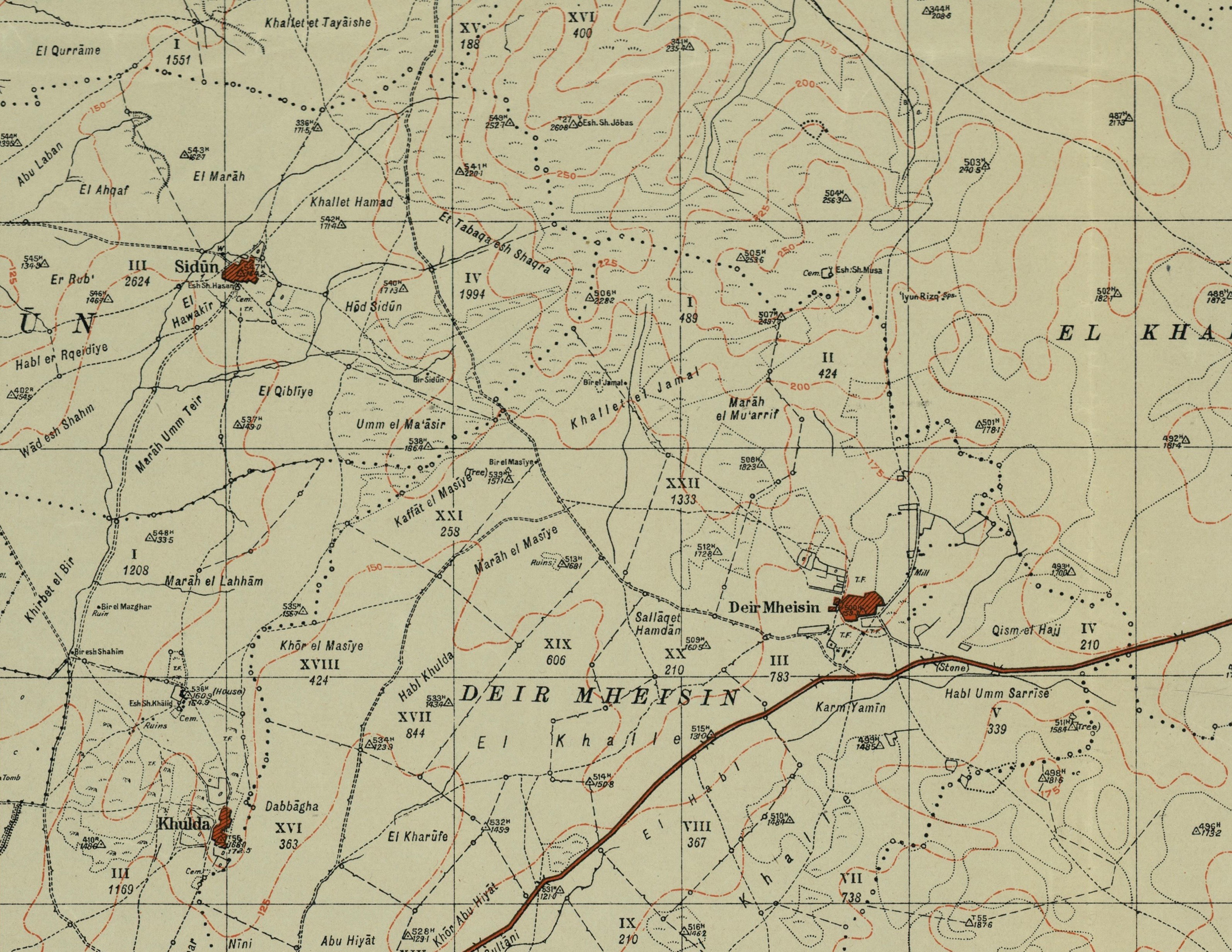
Dayr Muhaysin 1942 1:20,000

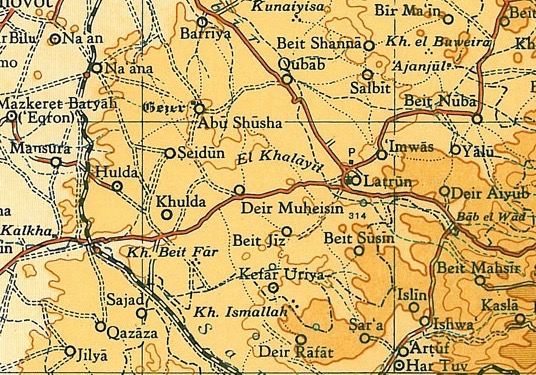
Dayr Muhaysin 1945 1:250,000

=== 1947–1948 war, and aftermath ===
In December 1947 the village was evacuated. The Jewish Haganah paramilitary force paved an alternative route from Al-Masmiyya to Latrun, in order not to pass through the Palestinian Arab city of Ramla but the alternative route passed near the village. In the first month of the 1947–48 Civil War in Mandatory Palestine there were attacks on Jewish transportation. In these attacks two high Jewish commanders were killed and according to Israeli historian Yoav Gelber, fear from acts of revenge led the villagers to temporarily evacuate.

The village was captured on April 6, 1948, during Operation Nachshon. The operational orders were to treat all Arab villages on the Khulda – Jerusalem corridor as "enemy assembly of jump off places", and such villages were to be destroyed and the villagers expelled. Dayr Muhaysin, Khulda and Saydun were the three first target villages.

In 1951, the Israeli settlement of Beko'a was established on village land, northwest of the village site.

== Bibliography ==
- Barron, J.B., ed. (1923). Palestine: Report and General Abstracts of the Census of 1922. Government of Palestine.
- Conder, C.R.; Kitchener, H.H. (1883). The Survey of Western Palestine: Memoirs of the Topography, Orography, Hydrography, and Archaeology. Vol. 3. London: Committee of the Palestine Exploration Fund.
- Esber, R. (2008). Under the Cover of War, The Zionist Expulsions of the Palestinians. Arabicus Books & Media. ISBN 978-0981513171.
- Gelber, Y. (2006). Palestine, 1948: War, Escape and the Emergence of the Palestinian Refugee Problem. Sussex Academic Press. ISBN 1845190750.
- Government of Palestine, Department of Statistics (1945). Village Statistics, April, 1945.
- Guérin, V. (1869). Description Géographique Historique et Archéologique de la Palestine (in French). Vol. 1: Judee, pt. 2. Paris: L'Imprimerie Nationale.
- Hadawi, S. (1970). Village Statistics of 1945: A Classification of Land and Area ownership in Palestine. Palestine Liberation Organization Research Center.
- Hartmann, M. (1883). "Die Ortschaftenliste des Liwa Jerusalem in dem turkeschen Staatskalender dur Syrien auf das Jahr 1288 der Flucht (1871)". Zeitschrift des Deutschen Palästina-Vereins. 6: 102–149.
- Khalidi, W. (1992). All That Remains: The Palestinian Villages Occupied and Depopulated by Israel in 1948. Washington D.C.: Institute for Palestine Studies. ISBN 0-88728-224-5.
- Mills, E., ed. (1932). Census of Palestine 1931. Population of Villages, Towns and Administrative Areas. Jerusalem: Government of Palestine.
- Morris, B. (2004). The Birth of the Palestinian Refugee Problem Revisited. Cambridge University Press. ISBN 978-0-521-00967-6.
- Palmer, E.H. (1881). The Survey of Western Palestine: Arabic and English Name Lists Collected During the Survey by Lieutenants Conder and Kitchener, R. E. Transliterated and Explained by E.H. Palmer. Committee of the Palestine Exploration Fund.
- Robinson, E.; Smith, E. (1841). Biblical Researches in Palestine, Mount Sinai and Arabia Petraea: A Journal of Travels in the year 1838. Vol. 3. Boston: Crocker & Brewster.
- Socin, A. (1879). "Alphabetisches Verzeichniss von Ortschaften des Paschalik Jerusalem". Zeitschrift des Deutschen Palästina-Vereins. 2: 135–163.
