= Khirbat Zakariyya =

Former village and archaeological site in Mandatory Palestine

Khirbat Zakariyya خربة زكريا
- Village
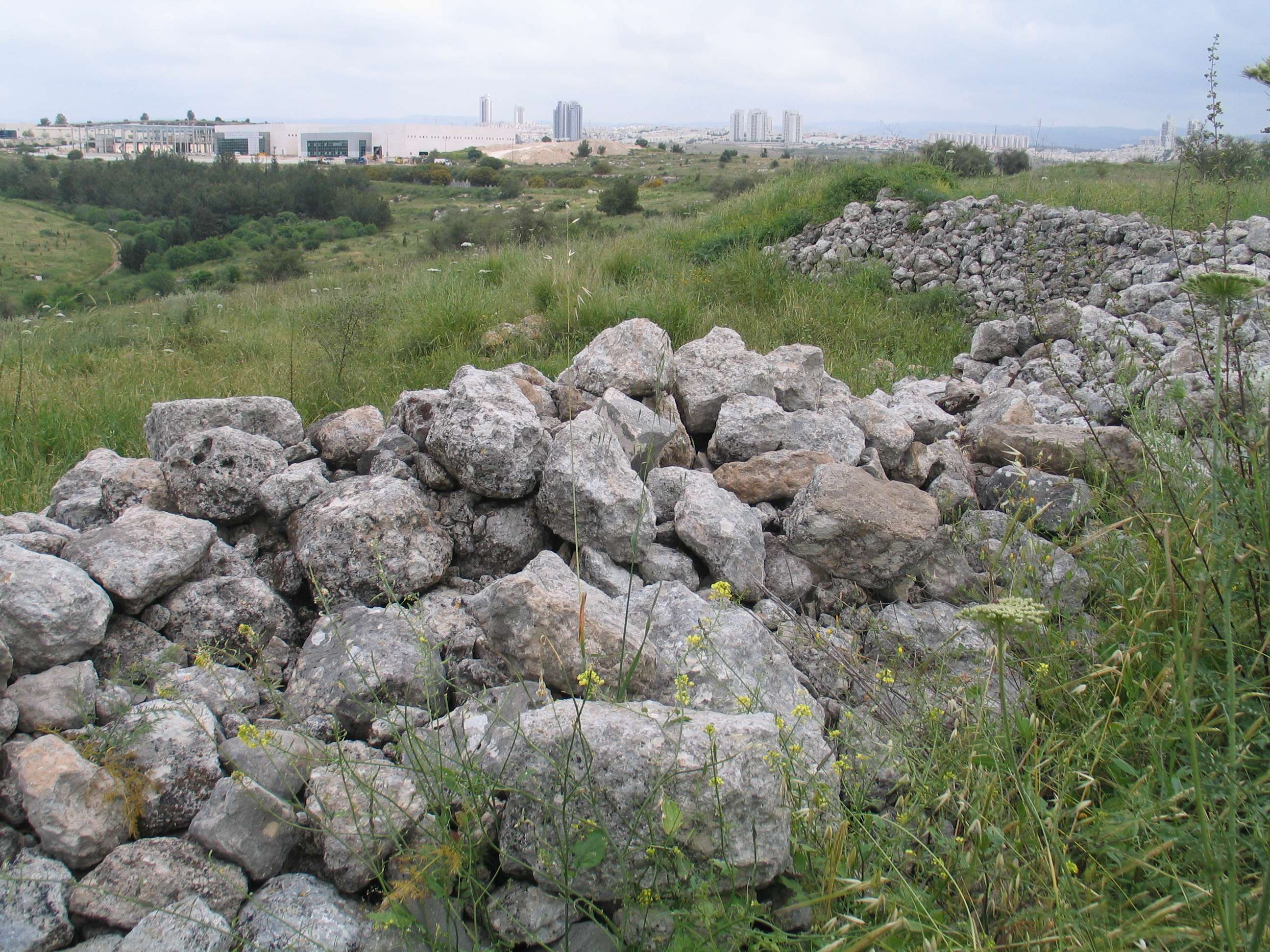
- Remains of Khirbat Zakariyya, 2016
- Etymology: Neby Zakarîya, the prophet Zechariah
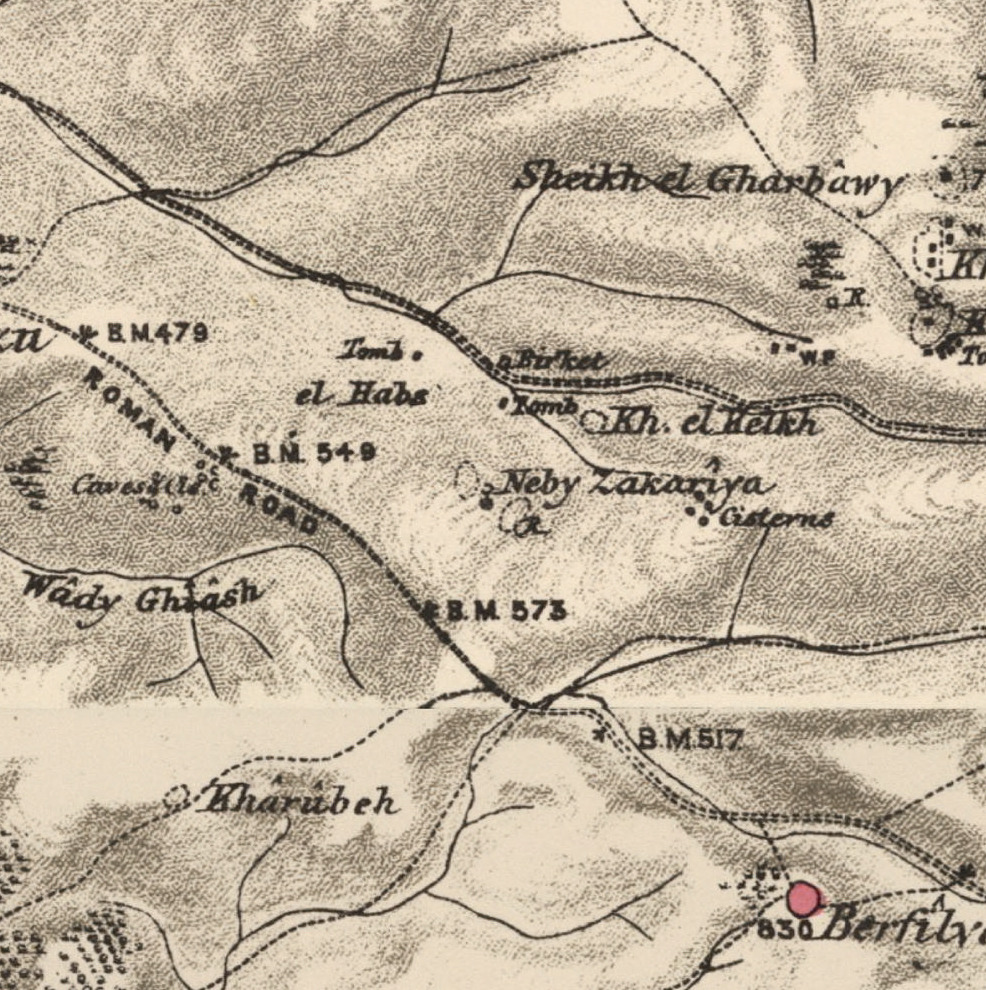
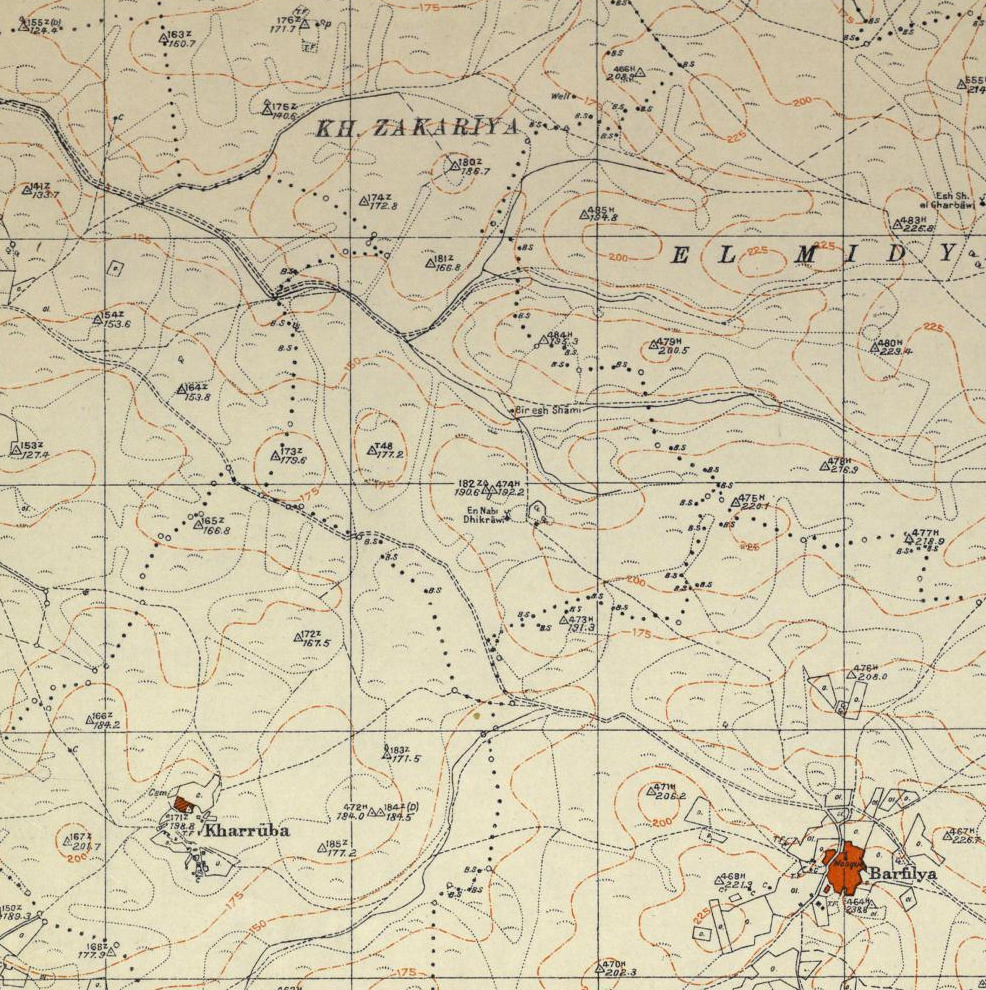
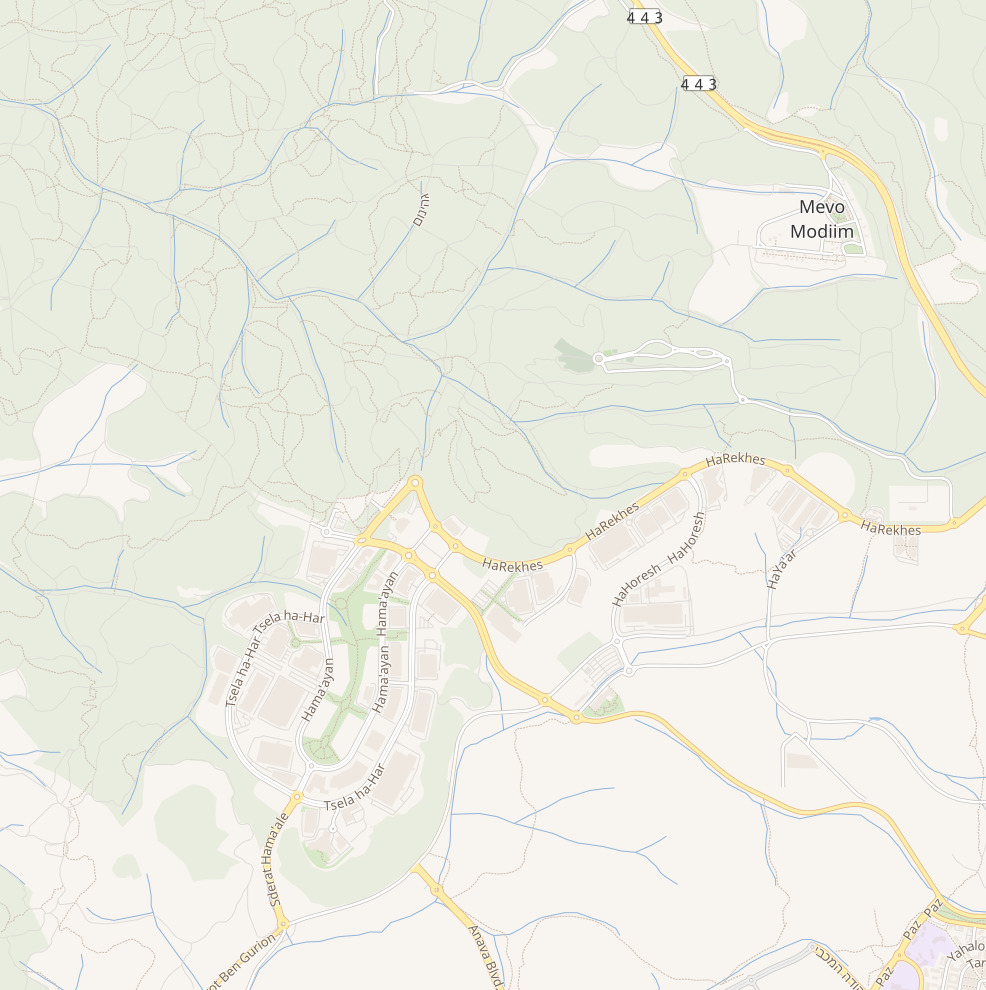
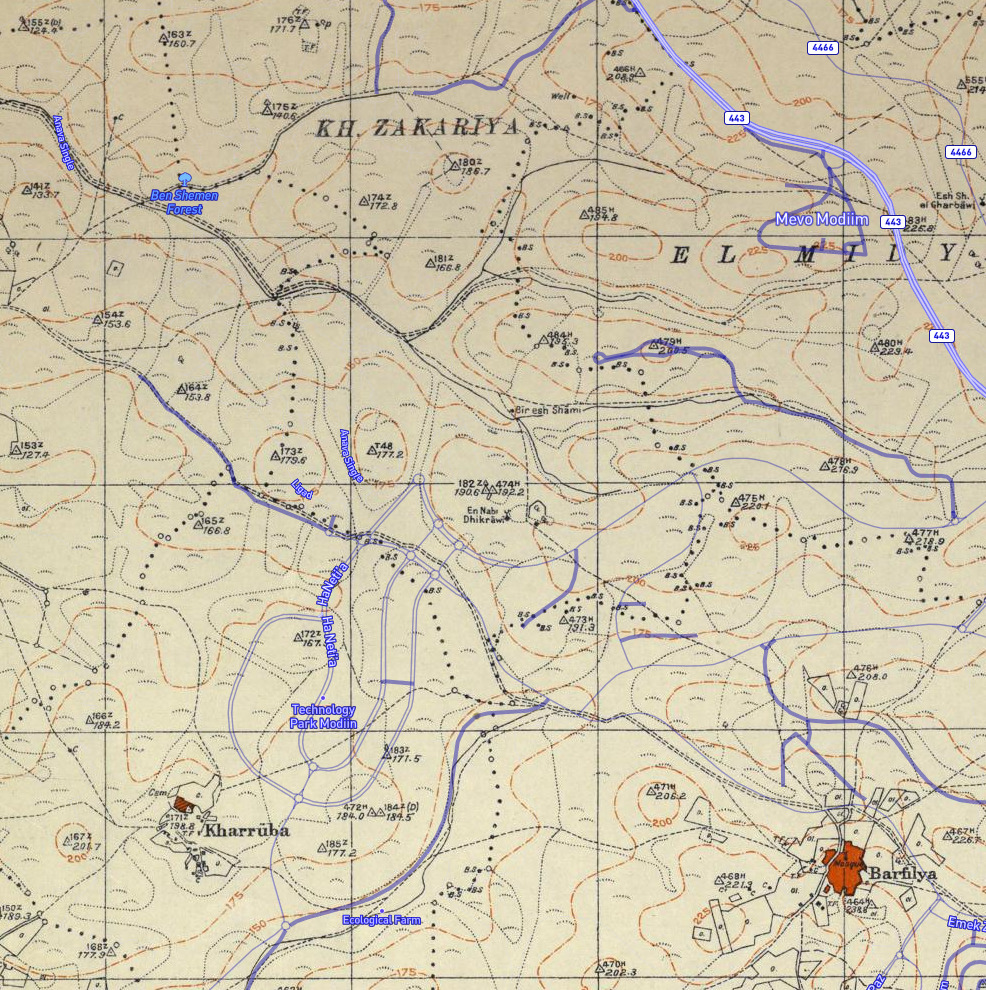
- 1870s map 1940s map modern map 1940s with modern overlay map A series of historical maps of the area around Khirbat Zakariyya (click the buttons)

- Location within Mandatory Palestine
- Coordinates: 31°55′28″N 34°58′23″E
- Palestine grid: 147/148
- Geopolitical entity: Mandatory Palestine
- Subdistrict: Ramle
- Date of depopulation: July 12–13, 1948

Area
  - Total: 4,538 dunams (4.538 km^{2}; 1.752 sq mi)
- Cause(s) of depopulation: Military assault by Yishuv forces
- Secondary cause: Influence of nearby town's fall

Khirbat Zakariyya (Arabic: خربة زكريا) was a Palestinian village in the Ramle Subdistrict of Mandatory Palestine. It was depopulated during the 1948 Arab–Israeli War on July 12, 1948, under the second stage of Operation Dani. It was located 9 km (5.6 mi) east of Ramla.

The archaeological site, also known Horbat Zekharya (Hebrew: חורבת זכריה) is today located next to the Technological Park of Modi'in-Maccabim-Re'ut, Israel. It forms part of a cluster of sites located in the Modi'in hills next to ancient roads linking Jerusalem and the coastal plain. This cluster include the site of Khirbat el-Kelkh / Horvat Kelah, and the caves at el-Habs.

In the 19th century it gave the name for an agricultural estate, which formed part of the territory controlled by the Palestinian-Arab Khawaja family of the Yaman tribal group, based in the village of Ni'lin to the east. Kh. Zakariyya was listed in the Village Statistics (1945), prepared by Mandatory Palestine with an of 4,538 dunams, of which about half are used for growing cereals. In July 1948, During Operation Danny, Kh. Zakariyya and other Palestinian-Arab localities in the region were captured and depopulated.

== Discovery and early research ==
The site was surveyed by European explorers during the late 19th century. In 1870 the French explorer Victor Guérin described Kh. Zakariyya: "at this moment they are covered with magnificent harvests, in the midst of which I observe many sherds of antique pottery and a considerable number of cubes of mosaic scattered on the ground. Several tombs and some ancient cisterns attract my attention. The most considerable ruins are those on a mound, where the remains of a rather powerful construction are seen in large blocks, of which only a few arches remain."

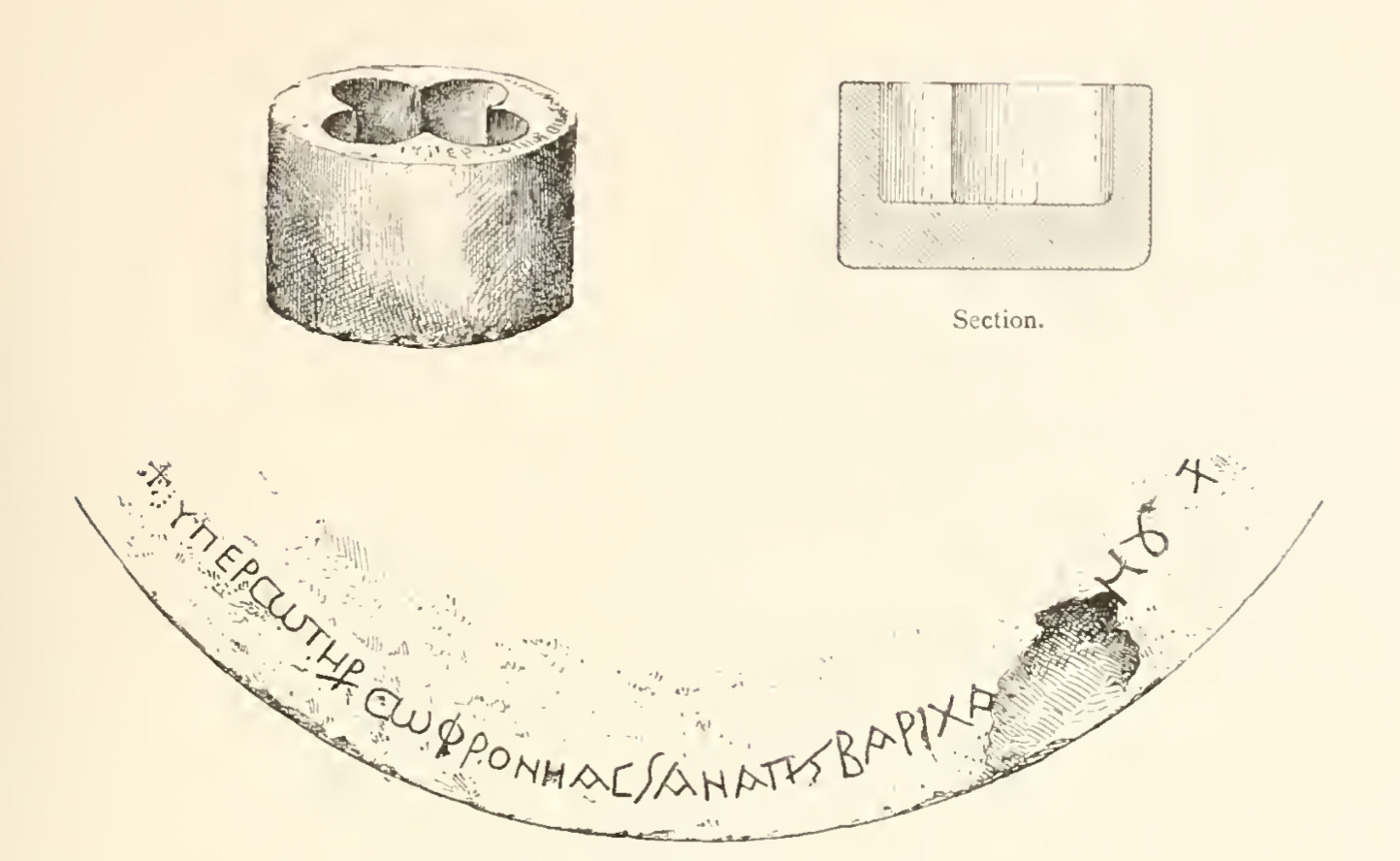
Baptismal font, found by Clermont-Ganneau,

In 1871–74 Charles Simon Clermont-Ganneau visited Khar'bet Zakarieh/Khurbet el Kelkh, and "found there a beautiful baptistery with a Greek inscription bearing the name of the donor Sophronia, and in a sepulchral cave in the same place another Greek inscription of The Christian era."

In 1882, the PEF's Survey of Western Palestine also noted the font at Khurbet el Kelkh, and compared it with the one found at Tuqu'. They further noted: "Foundations of large rough stones surround the little kubbeh of Neby Zakariya, and appear ancient." At nearby el Habs they found what would "appear to have been a hermit's cell, consisting of a long excavated chamber, with windows opening north-wards, cut high up in a scarp of rock facing north."

In 1891, Paul M. Séjourné visited the site during a tour in the region and found the baptistery dedicated to Sophronia on top of a mound. He noted that the other inscription has since been destroyed. He visited the monastic caves of el Habs and reported several tombs, including a "remakable" sculpted burial cave. He concluded with hopes of future research at the site.

In 1944 the British Department of Antiquities conducted an excavation near the Maqam of Nabi Zakariya, but the report was absent from the archives and its file only contains several photographs of a partially excavated remains of an ashlar-built structure, which survived only to foundations level. The structure featured a drainage system and hall paved with a mosaic floor. Fragments of architectural features such as cornice were also unearthed.

== Recent research ==
During the 90s the Israel Antiquities Authority (IAA) conducted a survey in the region headed by Alon Shavit and the three sites were visited. In 1998 the IAA surveyed an area allocated for the construction of the Modi'in Techonological Park, including H. Kelah, H. Zakariya and their agricultural hinterlands on the hills to the south and east. In 2017–2018, an extensive excavation conducted by Avraham S. Tendler of the IAA revealed a large previously unknown Islamic-period settlement south of the known antiquities at Kh. Zakariya.

=== Horbat Zakariya / Zekharya ===
The main site at Horbat Zakariya (Site 235) is a major early-Christian settlement dated mostly to the Byzantine period, spread over 25 dunams. The potsherds found on the ground belonged to vessels dated also to the Early Islamic, Middle Ages and Ottoman periods. In the middle of the site are the remains of a large public structure built of ashlar stones, measuring 6.2 x 11.3 meters. The building featured bases for columns and at one engaged column was observed. The walls of another structure were found on a terrace. Cisterns, capstones and natural caves are scattered around the site.

==== Islamic-period settlement ====
The salvage excavation conducted by the IAA in 2017–2018 exposed a previously unknown Islamic-period settlement. 3.5 dunams of this settlement were excavated southwest of the main site, at the top of the hill. The well-planned and constructed settlement was established in the 9th century CE, during the rule of the Abbasid Caliphate. The buildings were built directly on the bedrock. They were attached to each other, sharing walls the excavators identified 63 units. The settlement contained storerooms, at least three olive presses, a kiln, cisterns, and plenty of small finds. Several spaces were paved with mosaic floors. Several structures, which were destroyed and rebuilt were dated to the 11th century and the rule of the Fatimid Caliphate. The cause of the destruction is likely either of the 1033 and 1068 earthquakes in the region. The settlement never fully recovered and the population density reduced. Archaeological materials in some of the buildings attest to continued activity during the 12h century CE (Crusader period). Several structures were built during the 13th or 14 centuries CE, during the rule of the Mamluk Sultanate, including one building with a courtyard. In the late 15th century, the site became a cemetery. 64 cist tombs that were dug inside previous constructions. The archaeological remains do not provide evidence of the religious affiliation of the inhabitants. The excavators concluded that like its previous phase, the prosperous settlement of the Early Islamic period may have had a Christian, Muslim or mixed population.

=== Horbat el Kelah ===
At Horbat el Kelah (Site 168) architectural features were reported at 40 dunams. These included structures built of ashlar stones, rock-cut caves, one featuring a staircase, installations, and a concentration of cist tombs. An arcosolium tomb which served as a cistern in secondary use was observed. Several winepresses were surveyed. The finds included pottery, marble vessels, roof tiles, tessera and non-diagnostic flint tools. The indicative finds were dated to the Iron Age II, Persian, Hellenistic, Roman, Byzantine, and Early Islamic periods.

== History ==
=== British Manadate era ===
In the 1945 statistics Kh. Zakariyya had 4,538 dunams of land. Of this, a total of 2,161 dunams were used for cereals, while 2,377 dunams were classified as non-cultivable areas.

=== 1948, aftermath ===
Khirbat Zakariyya became depopulated on July 12–13, 1948, after a military assault by Israeli forces.

== Bibliography ==
- Clermont-Ganneau, C.S. (1896). [ARP] Archaeological Researches in Palestine 1873–1874, translated from the French by J. McFarlane. Vol. 2. London: Palestine Exploration Fund.
- Conder, C.R.; Kitchener, H.H. (1882). The Survey of Western Palestine: Memoirs of the Topography, Orography, Hydrography, and Archaeology. Vol. 2. London: Committee of the Palestine Exploration Fund.
- Danziger, Omri (2021-04-28). "Horbat Zekharya (south)". Hadashot Arkheologiyot – Excavations and Surveys in Israel (133).
- Department of Statistics (1945). Village Statistics, April, 1945. Government of Palestine.
- Guérin, V. (1875). Description Géographique Historique et Archéologique de la Palestine (in French). Vol. 2: Samarie, pt. 2. Paris: L'Imprimerie Nationale.
- Hadawi, S. (1970). Village Statistics of 1945: A Classification of Land and Area ownership in Palestine. Palestine Liberation Organization Research Center. Archived from the original on 2018-12-08.
- Khalidi, W. (1992). All That Remains: The Palestinian Villages Occupied and Depopulated by Israel in 1948. Washington D.C.: Institute for Palestine Studies. ISBN 0-88728-224-5.
- Morris, B. (2004). The Birth of the Palestinian Refugee Problem Revisited. Cambridge University Press. ISBN 978-0-521-00967-6.
- Palmer, E.H. (1881). The Survey of Western Palestine: Arabic and English Name Lists Collected During the Survey by Lieutenants Conder and Kitchener, R. E. Transliterated and Explained by E.H. Palmer. Committee of the Palestine Exploration Fund.
- Shachar, Dan (2017-12-03). "Horbat Zekharya". Hadashot Arkheologiyot – Excavations and Surveys in Israel (129).
- Tendler, Avraham S. (2021-11-14). "Horbat Zekharya". Hadashot Arkheologiyot – Excavations and Surveys in Israel (133).
