= Beko'a =

Beko'a: בקוע (Hebrew)
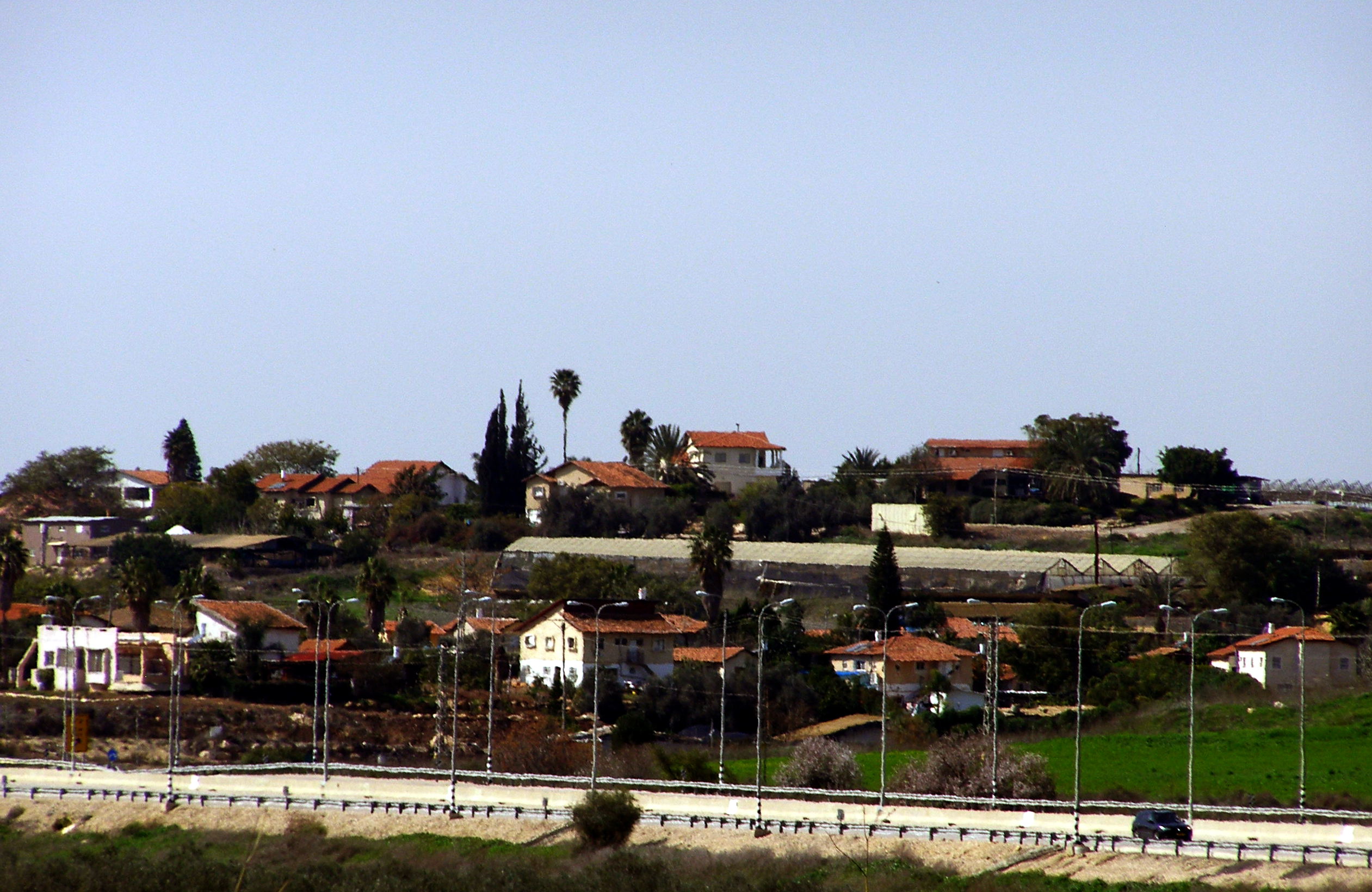
- Etymology: divided/split (passive participle of the verb בָּקַע, "baká", meaning "split" or "divide")
- Location within Jerusalem District Location within Israel
- Coordinates: 31°49′44″N 34°55′34″E
- Country: Israel
- District: Jerusalem
- Council: Mateh Yehuda
- Affiliation: Moshavim Movement
- Founded: 1952
- Founder: Yemenite Jews
- Population (2024): 977

Beko'a (Hebrew: בקוע, lit. 'divided') is a moshav in central Israel. Located near the city of Beit Shemesh, it falls under the jurisdiction of Mateh Yehuda Regional Council. In 2024 it had a population of 977.

== Name ==
The Hebrew proper noun "Beko'a" is semantically identical with the Hebrew verbal participle "beko'a" (בקוע), which means "divided" or "split". Said "beko'a" (בקוע) is the passive participle of the verb "baká" (בָּקַע), meaning "divide" or "split", and so means "split" or "divided". The meaning of this toponym is symbolic, referring to the division of nearby Jerusalem following the 1948 Arab–Israeli War.

== History ==
Beko'a was established in 1952 by immigrants from Yemen on Jewish historical land that had had been occupied by the Arab village of Dayr Muhaysin, which was completely depopulated by Jewish Haganah forces on April 6, 1948, during the Nachshon operation of the Plan Dalet phase of the 1948 Arab-Israeli War. The surviving inhabitants had fled in fear of further Haganah attacks.
