= Ramle Subdistrict, Mandatory Palestine =

Administrative division of British Palestine (1920–1948)

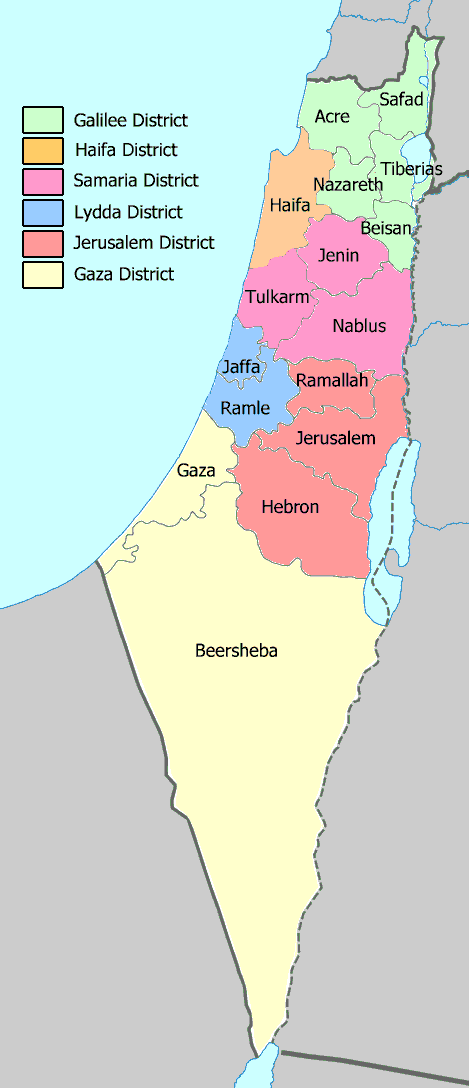
Subdistricts grouped by districts in 1945. Ramle Subdistrict as part of Lydda District in blue.

The Ramle Subdistrict was one of the subdistricts of Mandatory Palestine. It was part of Lydda District of the British Mandate of Palestine. The sub-district's main city was Ramle. Its total population in 1944 was estimated at 123,490, of which 88,560 were Muslims; 29,420 were Jews; and 5,500 were Christians. A number of Palestinian Arab villages in the subdistrict were ethnically cleansed during the Nakba, both by Zionist forces prior to the Israeli declaration of independence and after by Israeli forces. Following the war the area that had made up Ramla Subdistrict became a part of Israel's Central District, being mostly subdivided between a newly created Ramla Subdistrict and Rehovot Subdistrict.

== Towns and villages ==
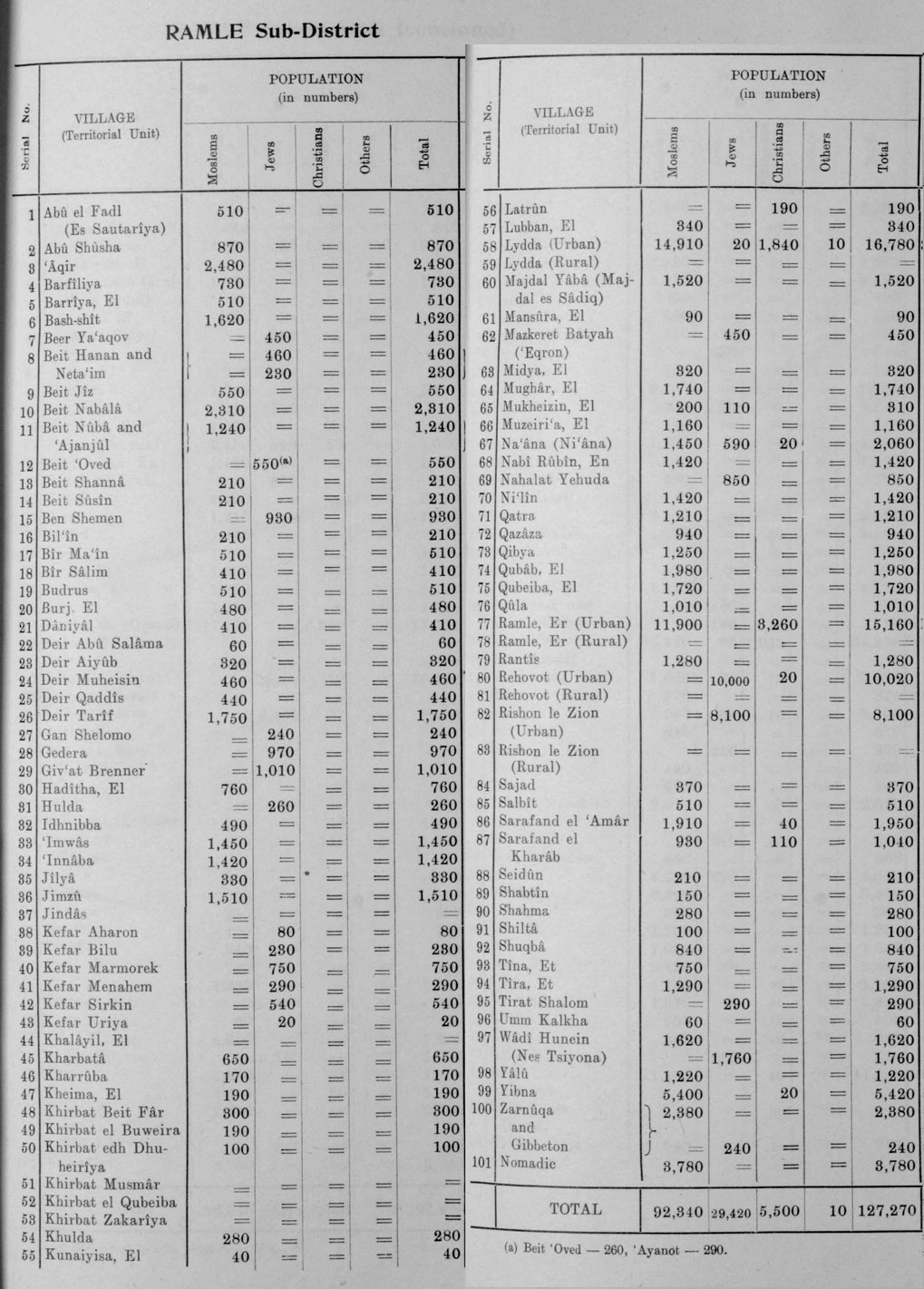
Official population statistics for the sub-district, from Village Statistics, 1945.

Ramle Sub-District – Population by Village
Village	Muslims	Jews	Christians	Others	Total
Abu el Fadl (Es Sautariya)	510				510
Abu Shusha	870				870
‘Aqir	2,480				2,480
Barfiliya	730				730
Barriya (El)	510				510
Bashshit	1,620				1,620
Beer Ya‘aqov		450			450
Beit Hanan		460			460
Neta‘im		230			230
Beit Jiz	550				550
Beit Nabala	2,310				2,310
Beit Nuba and ‘Ajanul	1,240				1,240
Beit ‘Oved		550			550
Beit Shanna	210				210
Beit Susin	210				210
Ben Shemen		930			930
Bil‘in	210				210
Bir Ma‘in	510				510
Bir Salim	410				410
Budrus	510				510
Burj (El)	480				480
Daniyal	410				410
Deir Abu Salama	60				60
Deir Aiyub	320				320
Deir Muhsein	460				460
Deir Qaddis	440				440
Deir Tarif	1,750				1,750
Gan Shelomo		240			240
Gedera		970			970
Giv‘at Brenner		1,010			1,010
Haditha (El)	760				760
Hulda		260			260
Idhnibba	490				490
‘Imwas	1,450				1,450
‘Inaba	1,420				1,420
Jilya	330				330
Jimzu	1,510				1,510
Jindas					
Kefar Aharon		80			80
Kefar Bilu		230			230
Kefar Marmorek		750			750
Kefar Menahem		290			290
Kefar Sirkin		540			540
Kefar Uriya		20			20
Khalayil (El)	650				650
Kharbatha	170				170
Kheima (El)	190				190
Khirbat Beit Far	300				300
Khirbat el Buweira	190				190
Khirbat edh Dhuhriya	100				100
Khuld	280				280
Kunaiyisa (El)	40				40
Latrun			190		190
Lubban (El)	340				340
Lydda (Urban)	14,910	20	1,840	10	16,780
Lydda (Rural)					
Majdal Yaba (Majdal es Sadiq)	1,520				1,520
Mansura (El)	90				90
Mazkeret Batyah (Eqron)		450			450
Midya (El)	320				320
Mughar (El)	1,740				1,740
Mukheizin (El)	200	110			310
Muzeiri‘a (El)	1,160				1,160
Na‘ana (Ni‘ana)	1,450	590	20		2,060
Nabi Rubin (En)	1,420				1,420
Nahalath Yehuda		850			850
Ni‘lin	1,420				1,420
Qatra	1,210				1,210
Qazaza	940				940
Qibya	1,250				1,250
Qubab (El)	1,980				1,980
Qubeiba (El)	1,720				1,720
Qula	1,010				1,010
Ramle (Urban)	11,900		3,260		15,160
Ramle (Rural)					
Rantis	1,280				1,280
Rehovot (Urban)		10,000	20		10,020
Rehovot (Rural)					
Rishon le Zion (Urban)		8,100			8,100
Rishon le Zion (Rural)					
Sajad	370				370
Sallit	510				510
Sarafand el ‘Amar	1,910		40		1,950
Sarafand el Kharab	930		110		1,040
Seidun	210				210
Shabtin	150				150
Shahma	280				280
Shilta	100				100
Shuqba	840				840
Tina (Et)	750				750
Tira (Et)	1,290				1,290
Tira Shalom		290			290
Umm Kalha	60				60
Wadi Hunein	1,620				1,620
Wadi Hunein (Nes Tsiyona)		1,760			1,760
Yalu	1,220				1,220
Yibna	5,400		20		5,420
Zarnuqa	2,380				2,380
Gibbeton		240			240
Nomadic	3,780				3,780
TOTAL	92,340	29,420	5,500	10	127,270

== Depopulated towns and villages ==
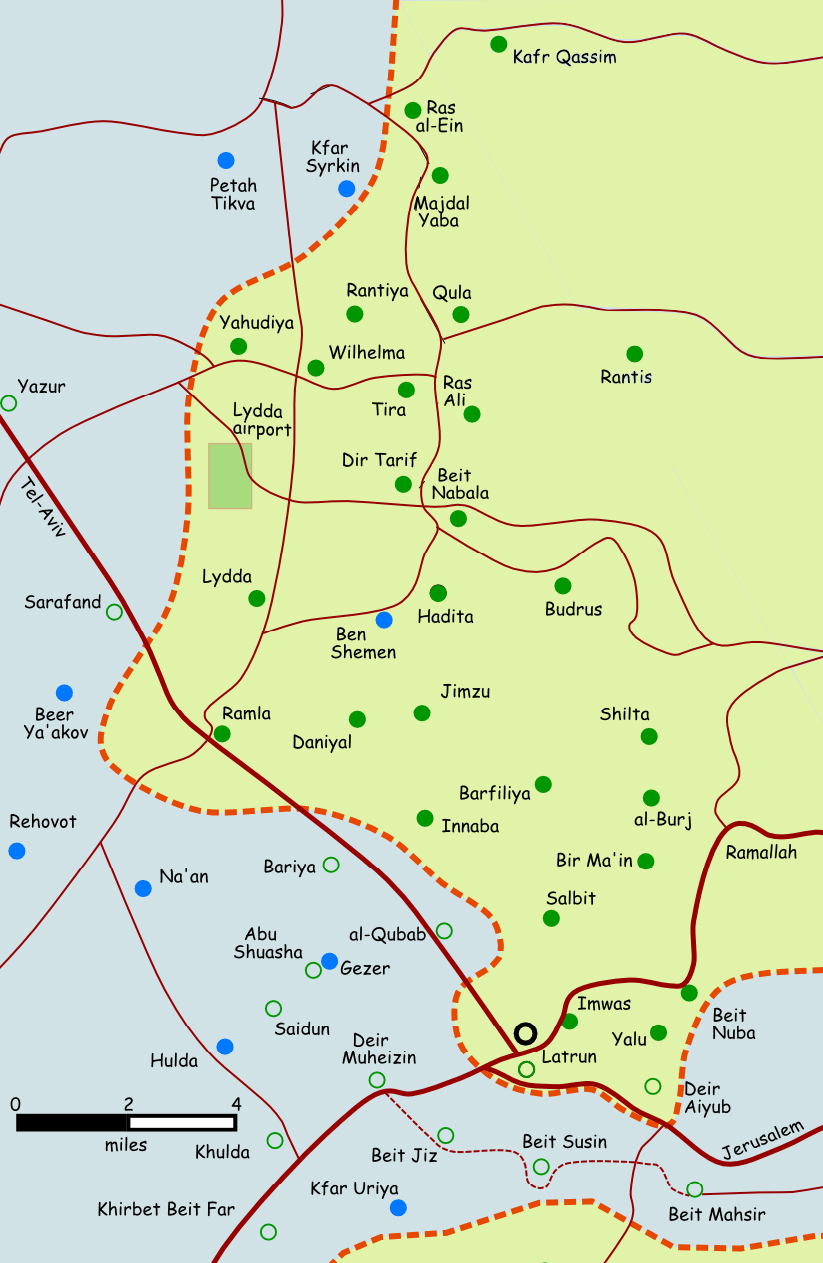
Depopulated villages in the subdistrict.

- Abu al-Fadl
- Abu Shusha
- Ajanjul
- Aqir
- Barfiliya
- al-Barriyya
- Bashshit
- Khirbat Bayt Far
- Bayt Jiz
- Bayt Nabala
- Bayt Shanna
- Bayt Susin
- Bir Ma'in
- Bir Salim
- al-Burj
- Khirbat al-Buwayra
- Daniyal
- Dayr Abu Salama
- Dayr Ayyub
- Dayr Muhaysin
- Dayr Tarif
- Khirbat al-Duhayriyya
- al-Haditha
- Idnibba
- Innaba
- Jilya
- Jimzu
- Kharruba
- al-Khayma
- Khulda
- al-Kunayyisa
- Latrun
- Lydda
- al-Maghar
- Majdal Yaba
- al-Mansura
- al-Mukhayzin
- al-Muzayri'a
- al-Na'ani
- Nabi Rubin
- Qatra
- Qazaza
- al-Qubab
- al-Qubayba
- Qula
- Ramle
- Sajad
- Salbit
- Sarafand al-Amar
- Sarafand al-Kharab
- Saydun
- Shahma
- Shilta
- al-Tina
- al-Tira
- Umm Kalkha
- Wadi Hunayn
- Yibna
- Khirbat Zakariyya
- Zarnuqa
