= Dayr Abu Salama =

Dayr Abu Salama دير أبو سلامة
- Village
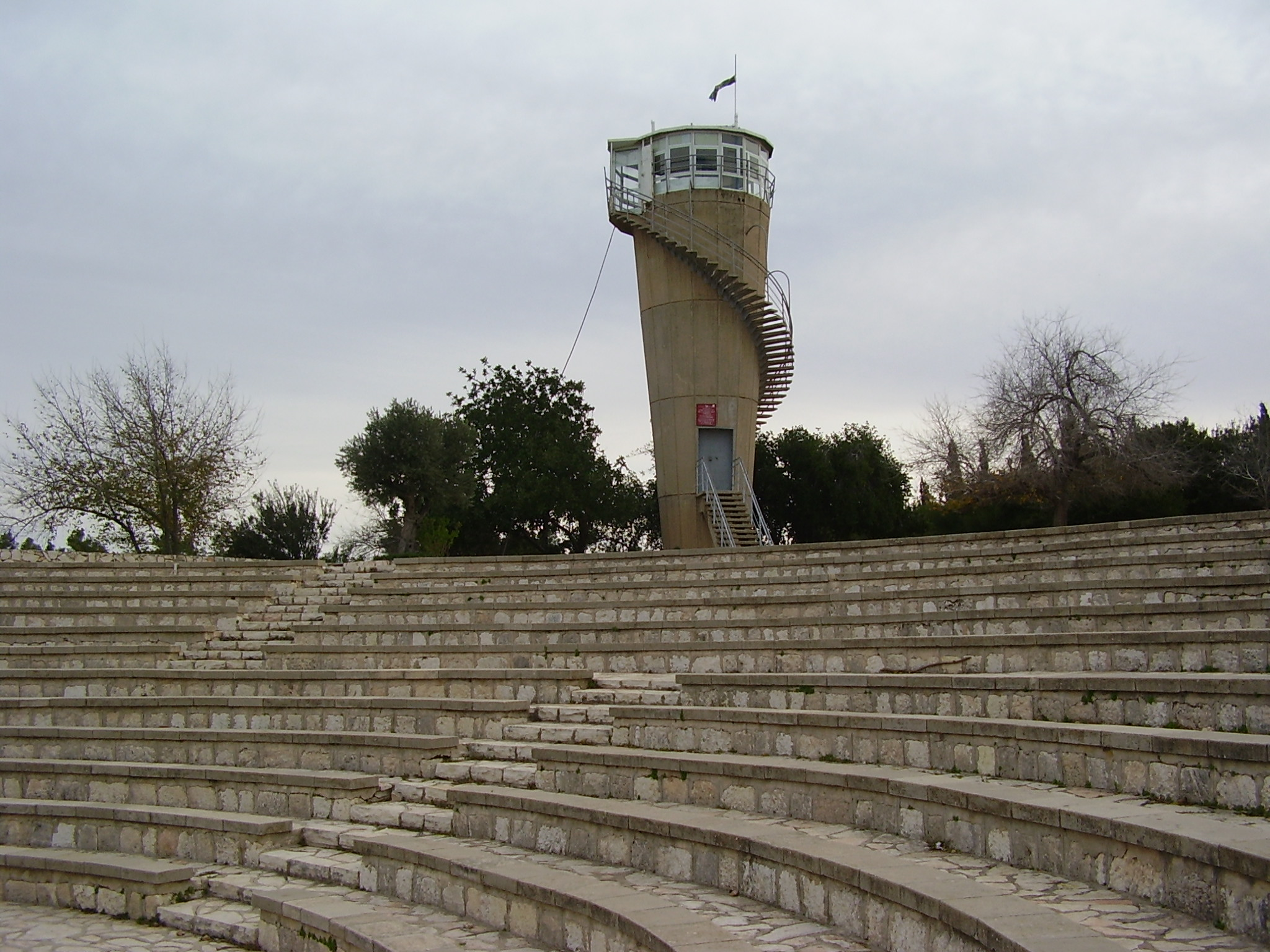
- Watchtower and amphitheater in Ben Shemen forest, constructed out of stones from Dayr Abu Salama houses
- Etymology: the monastery of Abu Selâmeh
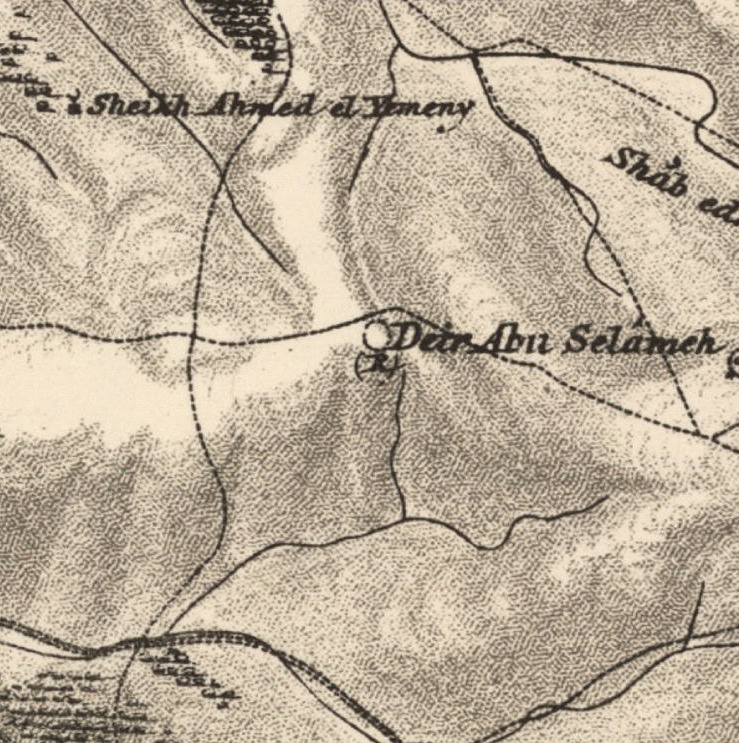
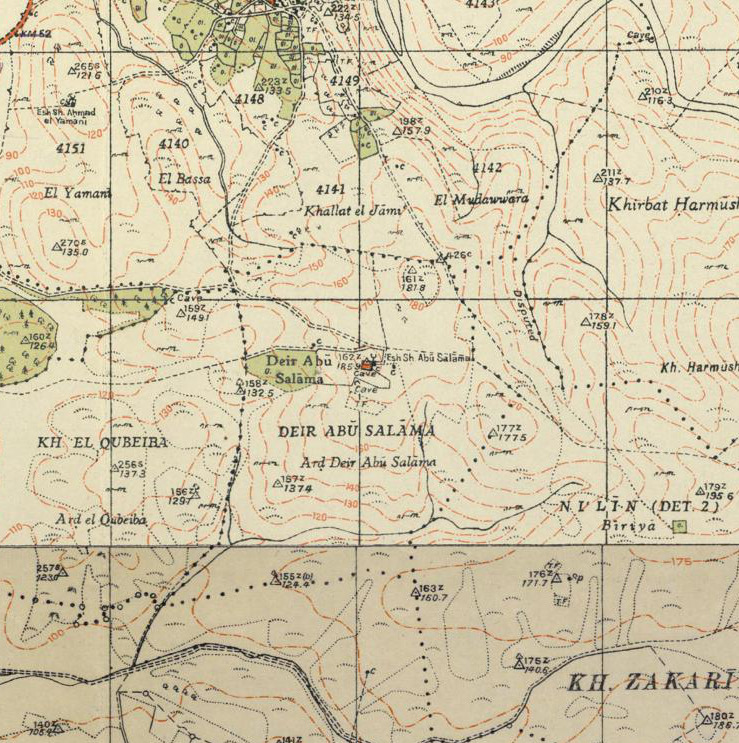
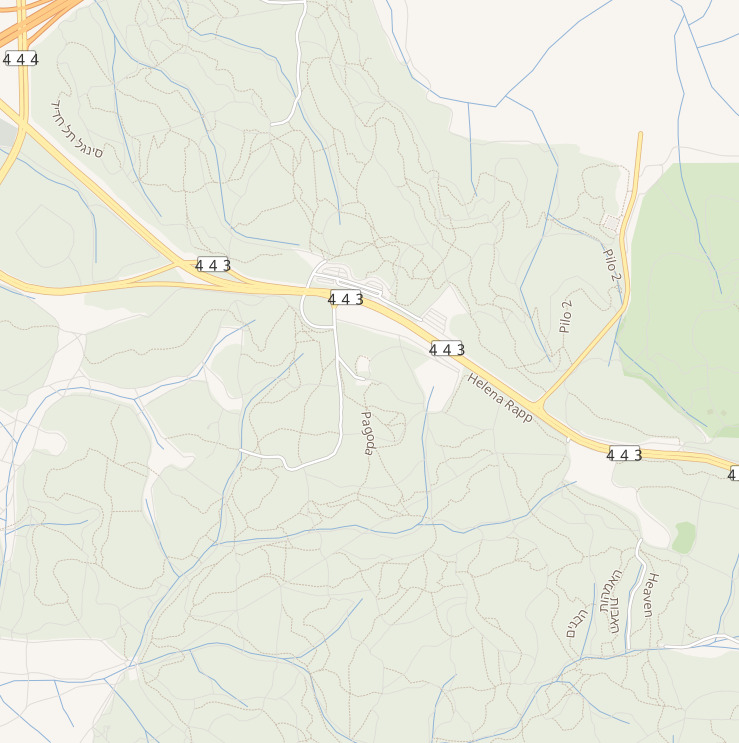
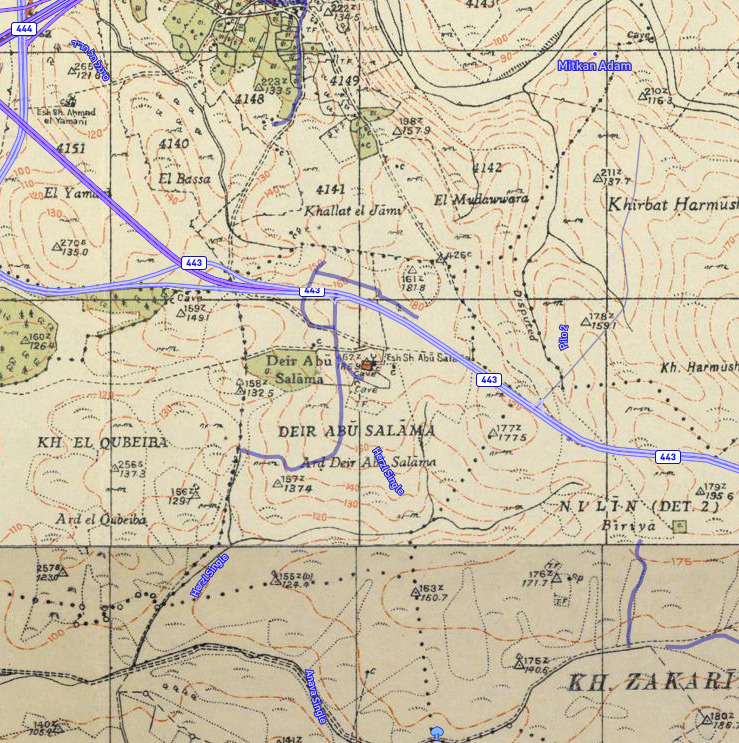
- 1870s map 1940s map modern map 1940s with modern overlay map A series of historical maps of the area around Dayr Abu Salama (click the buttons)

- Location within Mandatory Palestine
- Coordinates: 31°56′57″N 34°57′25″E
- Palestine grid: 146/150
- Geopolitical entity: Mandatory Palestine
- Subdistrict: Ramle
- Date of depopulation: July 13, 1948

Area
  - Total: 1,195 dunams (1.195 km^{2}; 0.461 sq mi)

Population (1945)
  - Total: 60
- Cause(s) of depopulation: Military assault by Yishuv forces

Dayr Abu Salama (Arabic: دير ابو سلامة) was a small Palestinian Arab village in the Ramle Subdistrict, located 8 km northeast of Ramla. It was depopulated during the 1948 Arab–Israeli War on July 13, 1948, in the first phase of Operation Dani.

== History ==
=== Late Ottoman period ===
In 1882 the PEF's Survey of Western Palestine (SWP) noted at Deir Abu Salameh: "Foundations, heaps of stones, and a few pillar shafts."

By the beginning of the 20th century, residents from neighbouring Ni'lin settled the site, establishing it as a dependency – or satellite village – of their home village.

=== British Mandate ===
In the 1922 census of Palestine conducted by the British Mandate authorities, Dair Abu Salameh had a population of 30 inhabitants; all Muslims,

In the 1945 statistics, it had a population of 60 Muslims with 1,195 dunams of land. Of this, 41 dunams were either irrigated or used for orchards, 695 used for cereals, while 459 dunams were classified as non-cultivable areas.

A shrine for a local sage known as al-Shaykh Abu Salama is also located in the village.

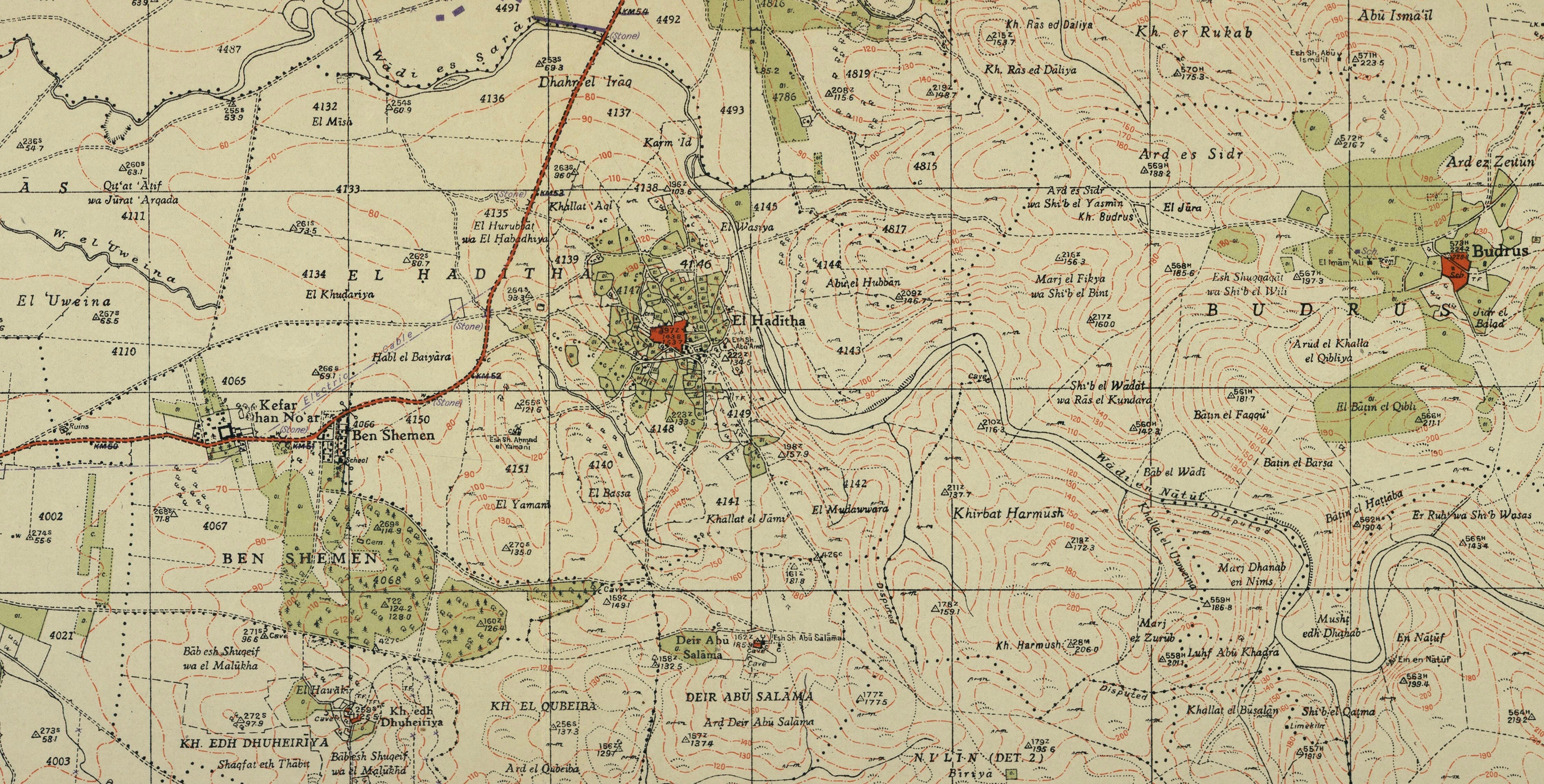
Dayr Abu Salama 1942 1:20,000

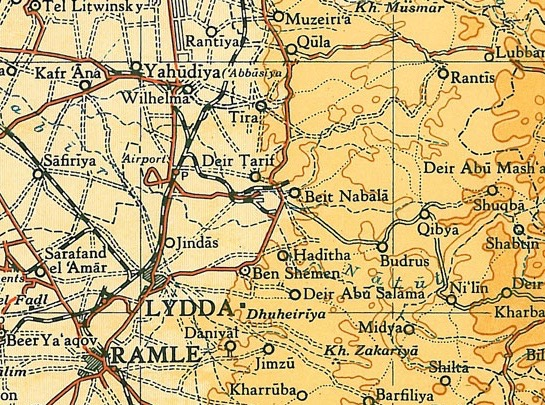
Dayr Abu Salama 1945 1:250,000

=== Israel ===
Dayr Abu Salama was depopulated during the 1948 Arab–Israeli War on July 13, 1948, in the first phase of Operation Dani.

In 1992 the village site was described: "The site has been converted into an Israeli picnic area and is surrounded by stands of pine and cypress trees. Workers for the Jewish National Fund have used stones retrieved from the destroyed village houses to construct a watchtower and an amphitheater on the village site. The area in front of the amphitheater has been leveled and is covered by a green lawn. Old fig and olive trees still grow there; cactuses and carob trees grow on the western and northern edges of the site."

== Bibliography ==
- Barron, J.B., ed. (1923). Palestine: Report and General Abstracts of the Census of 1922. Government of Palestine.
- Conder, C.R.; Kitchener, H.H. (1882). The Survey of Western Palestine: Memoirs of the Topography, Orography, Hydrography, and Archaeology. Vol. 2. London: Committee of the Palestine Exploration Fund.
- Department of Statistics (1945). Village Statistics, April, 1945. Government of Palestine.
- Hadawi, S. (1970). Village Statistics of 1945: A Classification of Land and Area ownership in Palestine. Palestine Liberation Organization Research Center.
- Khalidi, W. (1992). All That Remains: The Palestinian Villages Occupied and Depopulated by Israel in 1948. Washington D.C.: Institute for Palestine Studies. ISBN 0-88728-224-5.
- Morris, B. (2004). The Birth of the Palestinian Refugee Problem Revisited. Cambridge University Press. ISBN 978-0-521-00967-6.
- Palmer, E.H. (1881). The Survey of Western Palestine: Arabic and English Name Lists Collected During the Survey by Lieutenants Conder and Kitchener, R. E. Transliterated and Explained by E.H. Palmer. Committee of the Palestine Exploration Fund.
