= Sajad =

- Village
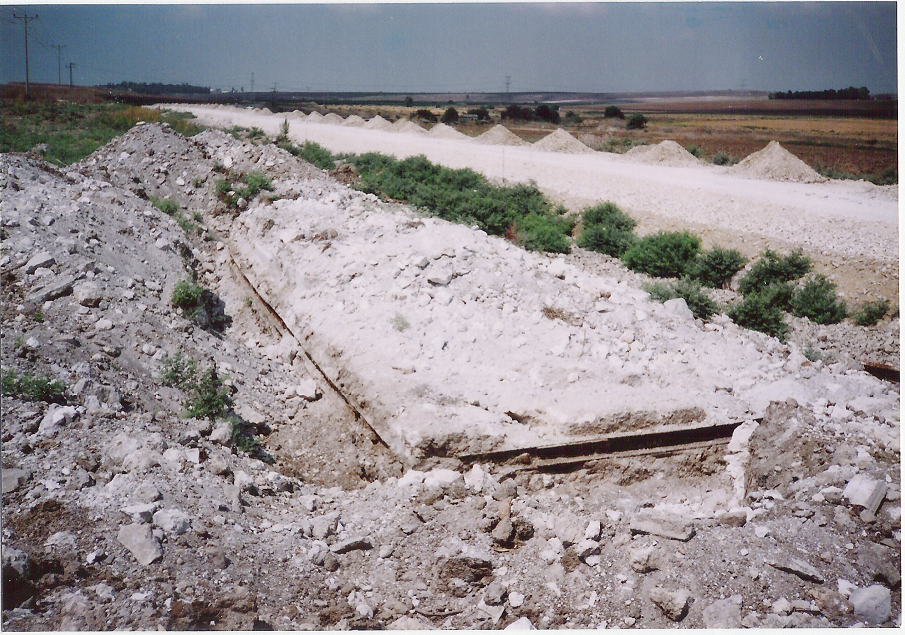
- Remains of Sajad Railway platform.
- Etymology: Kh. es Sejed, the ruin of adoration
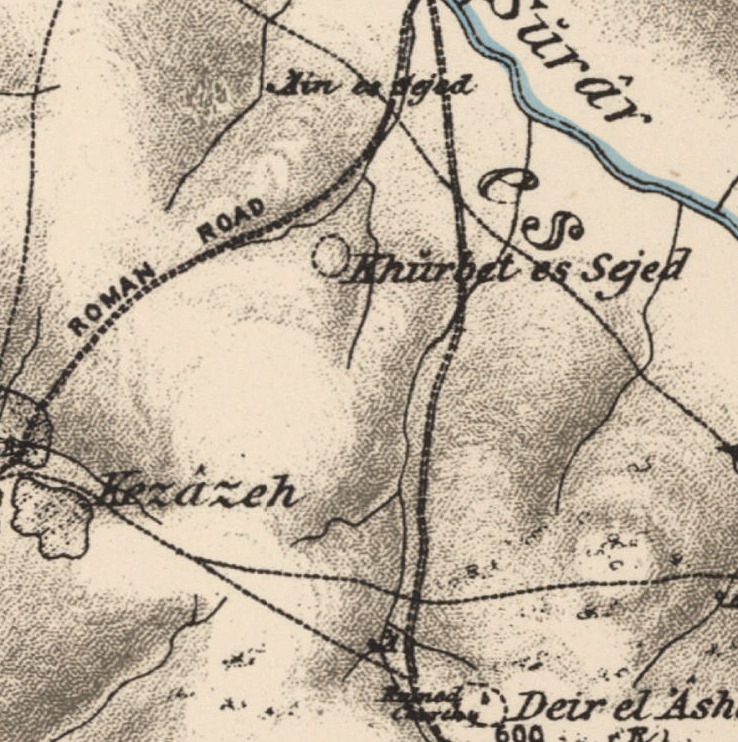
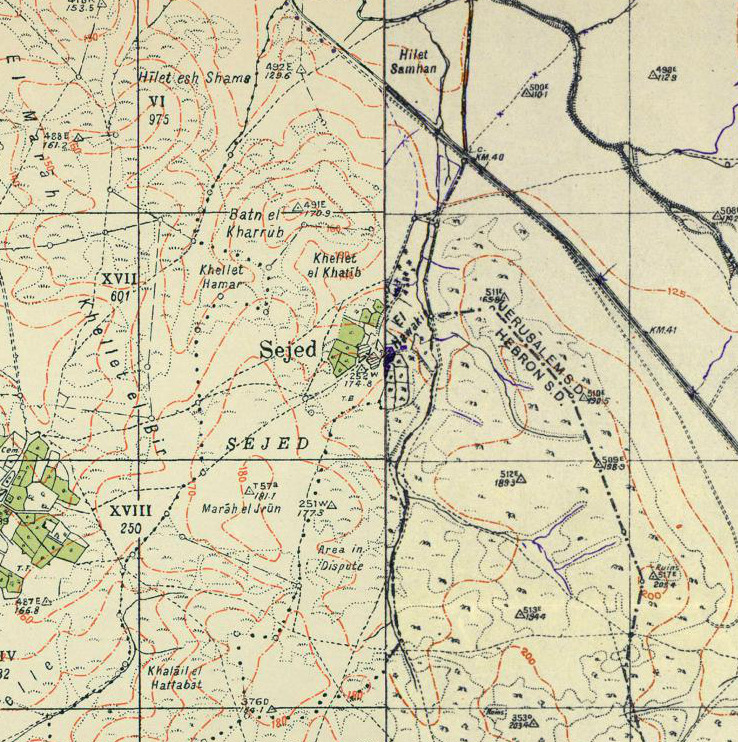
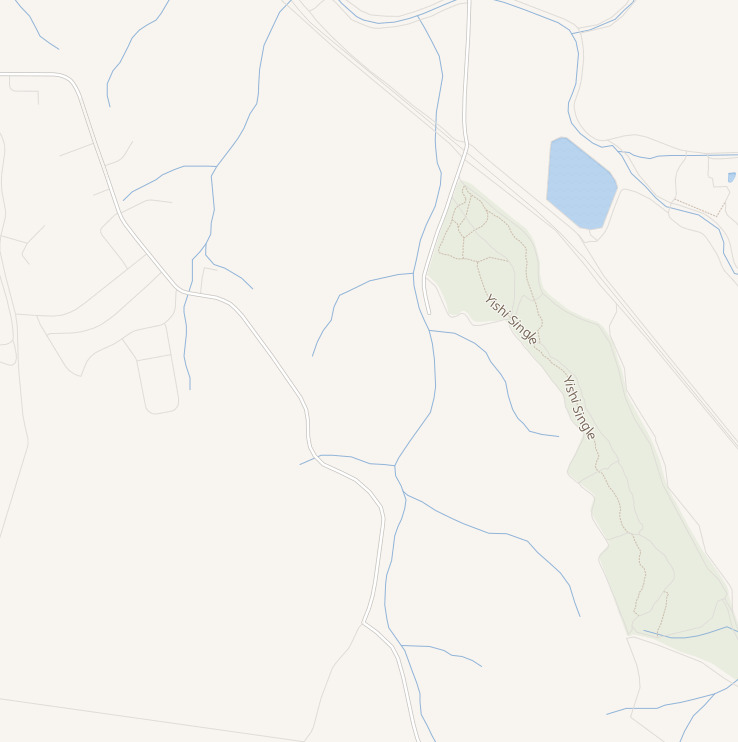
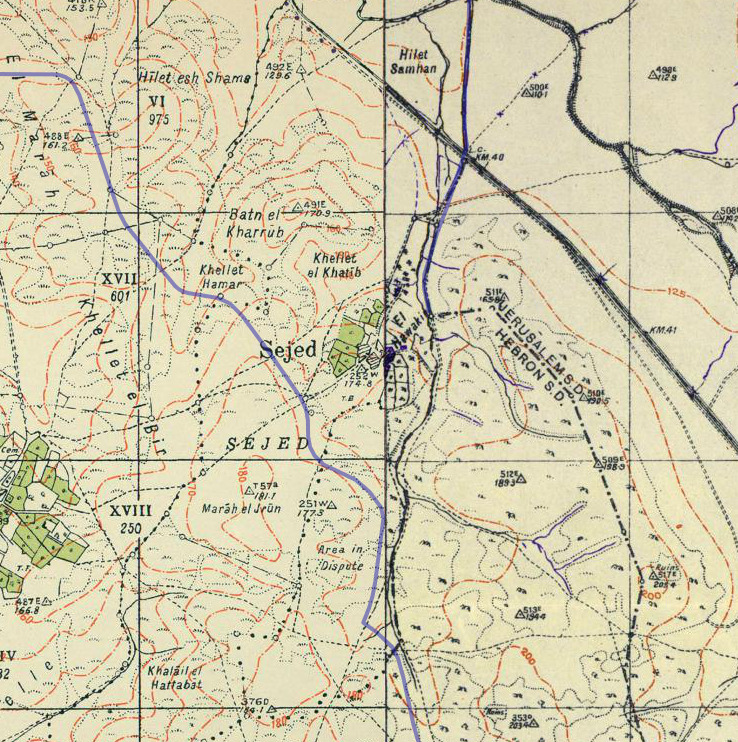
- 1870s map 1940s map modern map 1940s with modern overlay map A series of historical maps of the area around Sajad (click the buttons)

- Location within Mandatory Palestine
- Coordinates: 31°47′01″N 34°53′34″E
- Palestine grid: 139/132
- Geopolitical entity: Mandatory Palestine
- Subdistrict: Ramle
- Date of depopulation: 1948

Area
  - Total: 2,795 dunams (2.795 km^{2}; 1.079 sq mi)

Population (1945)
  - Total: 370
- Current Localities: Israeli military zone

Sajad (Arabic: سجد) was a Palestinian village in the Ramle Subdistrict. It was located 16 km (9.9 mi) south of Ramla. Sajad was established in the late 19th century near a local train station. It was depopulated during the 1948 Arab–Israeli war.

== History ==
In 1838, Sejad was noted as a place "in ruins or deserted."

The village of Sajad was the site of a railway station built by the French in Ottoman era Palestine. In August 1892, the Jaffa–Jerusalem railway service was initiated; the train stopped in Sajad. The station was closed after a new railway line and station were built at nearby Wadi Sarar in 1915.

The land which the villagers cultivated, was at one time owned by the Ottoman sultan Abd al-Hamid, but it was taken from him by the Ottoman government in 1908. After this, the village land was classified as jiftlik land, owned by the government but leased on a long-term basis to the villagers.

=== British Mandate era ===
In the 1922 census of Palestine, conducted by the British Mandate authorities, Sajad had a population of 221 Muslims, increasing in the 1931 census to 300, still all Muslims, in a total of 66 houses.

The village did not have a school on its own, but in 1945–46 it started sending its students to a school in Qazaza, a village to the southeast.

In the 1945 statistics the population was 370, all Muslims, while the total land area was 2,795 dunams, according to an official land and population survey. Of this, a total of 1,687 dunums of land were used for cereals, while 19 dunams were classified as built-up public areas.

=== 1948 and after ===
A military operation planned by the pre-state Israeli forces against the village of Sajad as part of Operation Nahshon is recorded in a document from the Nahshon Headquarters to the 52nd Battalion, dated 15 April 1948. According to Benny Morris, "Battalion 3 was ordered to annihilate and destroy the village of Sajad." According to Khalidi the village was taken on 9–10 July as part of the Givati Brigade's Operation An-Far.

Some Palestinian refugees from Sajad continue to express a desire to return to the site of their former village and have voiced distrust toward Arab countries in which they live as refugees. Hassan, a refugee in the Marka camp in Jordan, described "the Arabs" as "traitors" and said he would prefer to "live in a tent in my homeland than a castle anywhere else", expressing his view that a home elsewhere would never truly be his.

According to Walid Khalidi, in 1992 the site of the former village of Sajad was inaccessible, as it was a military zone in Israel.

== See also ==
- Depopulated Palestinian locations in Israel

== Bibliography ==
- Barron, J.B., ed. (1923). Palestine: Report and General Abstracts of the Census of 1922. Government of Palestine.
- Chatty, D.; Hundt, Gillian Lewando (2005). Children of Palestine: Experiencing Forced Migration in the Middle East. Berghan Books. ISBN 1-84545-010-8.
- Gilbar, Gad G. (1990). Ottoman Palestine, 1800-1914: Studies in Economic and Social History. Brill Archive. ISBN 90-04-07785-5.
- Government of Palestine, Department of Statistics (1945). Village Statistics, April, 1945.
- Hadawi, S. (1970). Village Statistics of 1945: A Classification of Land and Area ownership in Palestine. Palestine Liberation Organization Research Center.
- Khalidi, W. (1992). All That Remains: The Palestinian Villages Occupied and Depopulated by Israel in 1948. Washington D.C.: Institute for Palestine Studies. ISBN 0-88728-224-5.
- Mills, E., ed. (1932). Census of Palestine 1931. Population of Villages, Towns and Administrative Areas. Jerusalem: Government of Palestine.
- Morris, B. (2004). Birth of the Palestinian Refugee Problem Revisited. Cambridge University Press. ISBN 0-521-00967-7.
- Palmer, E.H. (1881). The Survey of Western Palestine: Arabic and English Name Lists Collected During the Survey by Lieutenants Conder and Kitchener, R. E. Transliterated and Explained by E.H. Palmer. Committee of the Palestine Exploration Fund.
- Robinson, E.; Smith, E. (1841). Biblical Researches in Palestine, Mount Sinai and Arabia Petraea: A Journal of Travels in the year 1838. Vol. 3. Boston: Crocker & Brewster.
