= Khirbat al-Duhayriyya =

Khirbat al-Duhayriyya خربة الظهيرية
- Village
- Etymology: The ruin of the ridge
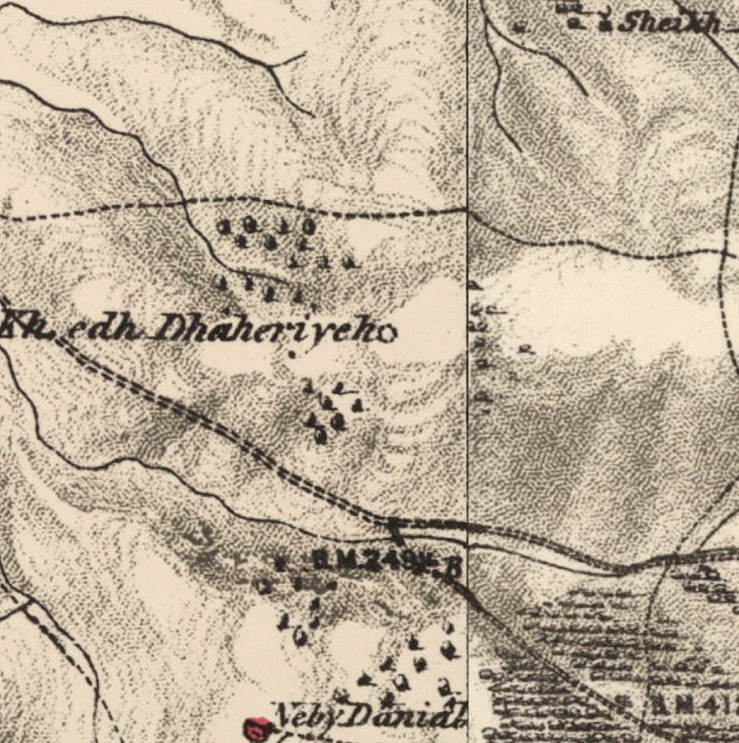
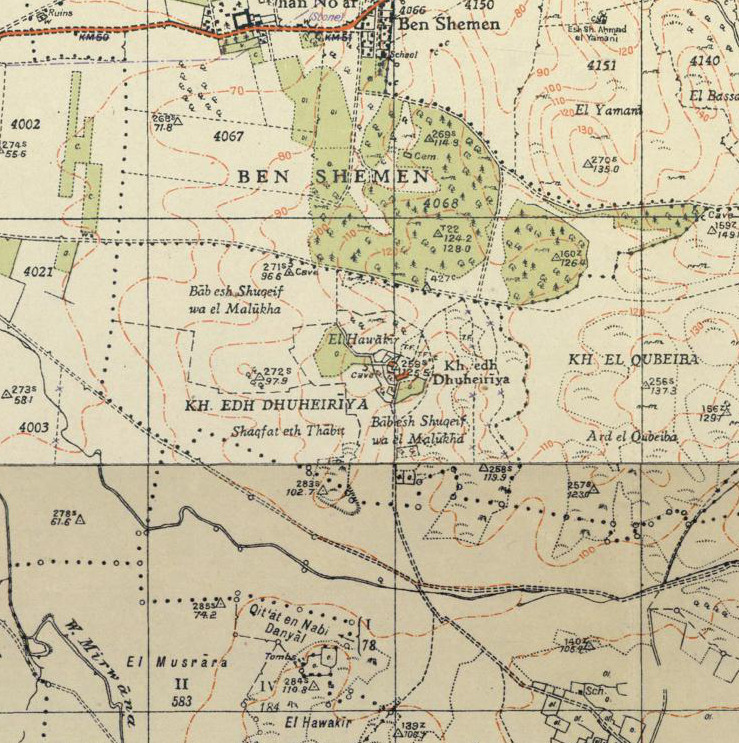
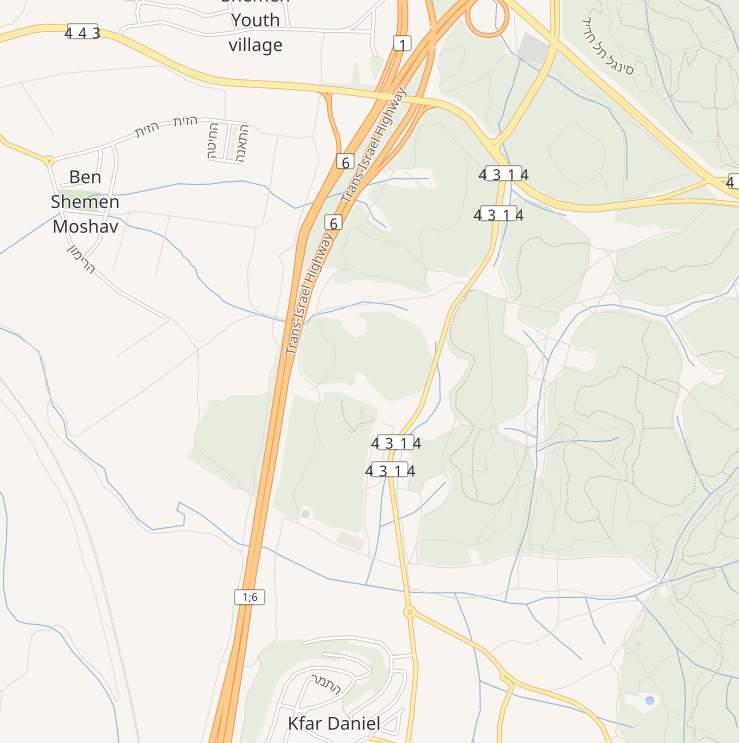
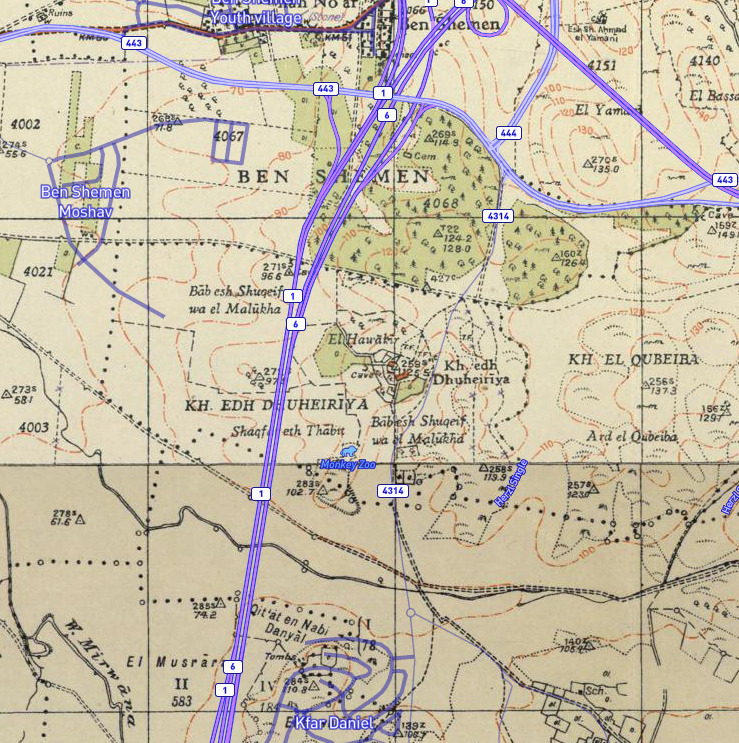
- 1870s map 1940s map modern map 1940s with modern overlay map A series of historical maps of the area around Khirbat al-Duhayriyya (click the buttons)

- Location within Mandatory Palestine
- Coordinates: 31°56′46″N 34°56′03″E
- Palestine grid: 144/150
- Geopolitical entity: Mandatory Palestine
- Subdistrict: Ramle
- Date of depopulation: July 10, 1948

Area
  - Total: 1,341 dunams (1.341 km^{2}; 0.518 sq mi)

Population (1945)
  - Total: 100
- Cause(s) of depopulation: Military assault by Yishuv forces

Khirbat al-Duhayriyya (Arabic: خربة الظهيرية) was a Palestinian Arab village in the Ramle Subdistrict. It was depopulated during the 1948 Arab-Israeli War on July 10, 1948, by the Givati Brigade under the first phase of Operation Dani. It was located 6 km northeast of Ramla.

== History ==
In 1874 Clermont-Ganneau noted the site, called Kh. edh Dh'heiriyeh, located about half an hour east of Lydda.

In 1882, the PEF's Survey of Western Palestine found at Khurbet edh Dhaheriyeh: "Foundations of buildings, apparently modern. Ruined kubbeh."

By the beginning of the 20th century, residents from neighbouring Ni'lin settled the site, establishing it as a dependency – or satellite village – of their home village.

=== British Mandate era ===
At the time of the 1931 census, the village, called Ez Zuheiriya, had 10 occupied houses and a population of 69 inhabitants, all Muslims.

In the 1945 statistics the village had a population of 100 Muslims. The total land area was 1,341 dunams, of this, a total of 1,224 dunums were used for cereals, 66 dunums were irrigated or used for plantations, while 351 dunams were classified as non-cultivable areas.

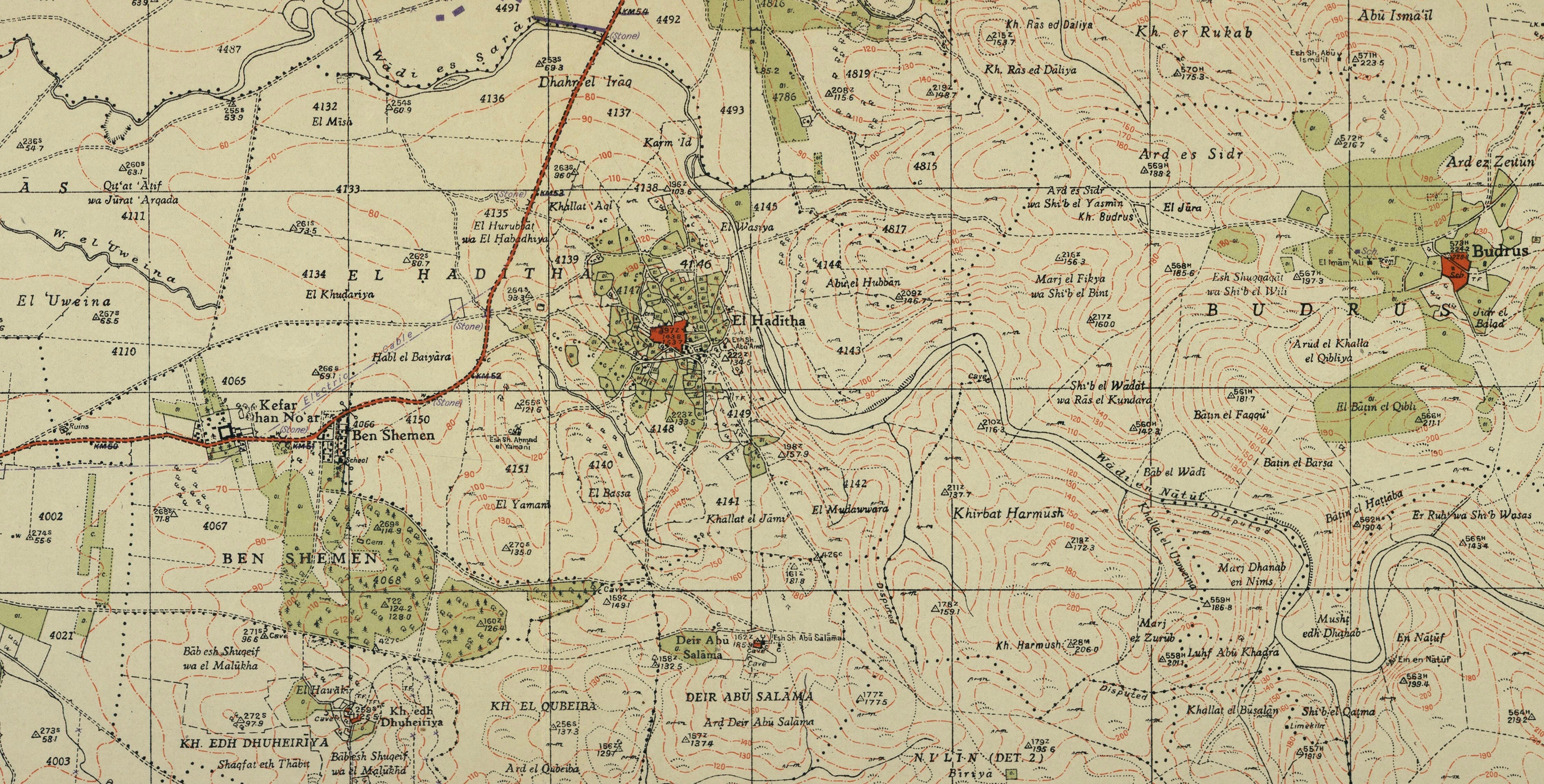
Khirbat al-Duhayriyya 1942 1:20,000

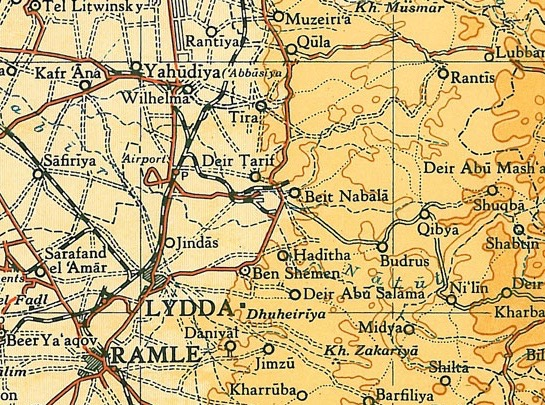
Khirbat al-Duhayriyya 1945 1:250,000

=== 1948, aftermath ===
Khirbat al-Duhayriyya was depopulated on July 10, 1948.

In 1992 the village site was described: "The walls of some ten houses still stand. Otherwise, the village has been reduces to piles of stone rubble interspersed with fig, doum palm, and almond trees, along with thickets of thorn and wild vegetation. The site is fenced in and serves as pasture for animals. Cactuses grow along the northern and southern sides of the site."

== Bibliography ==
- Clermont-Ganneau, C.S. (1896). [ARP] Archaeological Researches in Palestine 1873–1874, translated from the French by J. McFarlane. Vol. 2. London: Palestine Exploration Fund.
- Conder, C.R.; Kitchener, H.H. (1882). The Survey of Western Palestine: Memoirs of the Topography, Orography, Hydrography, and Archaeology. Vol. 2. London: Committee of the Palestine Exploration Fund.
- Department of Statistics (1945). Village Statistics, April, 1945. Government of Palestine.
- Hadawi, S. (1970). Village Statistics of 1945: A Classification of Land and Area ownership in Palestine. Palestine Liberation Organization Research Center. Archived from the original on 2018-12-08.
- Khalidi, W. (1992). All That Remains: The Palestinian Villages Occupied and Depopulated by Israel in 1948. Washington D.C.: Institute for Palestine Studies. ISBN 0-88728-224-5.
- Mills, E., ed. (1932). Census of Palestine 1931. Population of Villages, Towns and Administrative Areas. Jerusalem: Government of Palestine.
- Morris, B. (2004). The Birth of the Palestinian Refugee Problem Revisited. Cambridge University Press. ISBN 978-0-521-00967-6.
- Palmer, E.H. (1881). The Survey of Western Palestine: Arabic and English Name Lists Collected During the Survey by Lieutenants Conder and Kitchener, R. E. Transliterated and Explained by E.H. Palmer. Committee of the Palestine Exploration Fund.
