= Shahma =

Shahma شحمة Shameh
- Village
- Etymology: from personal name
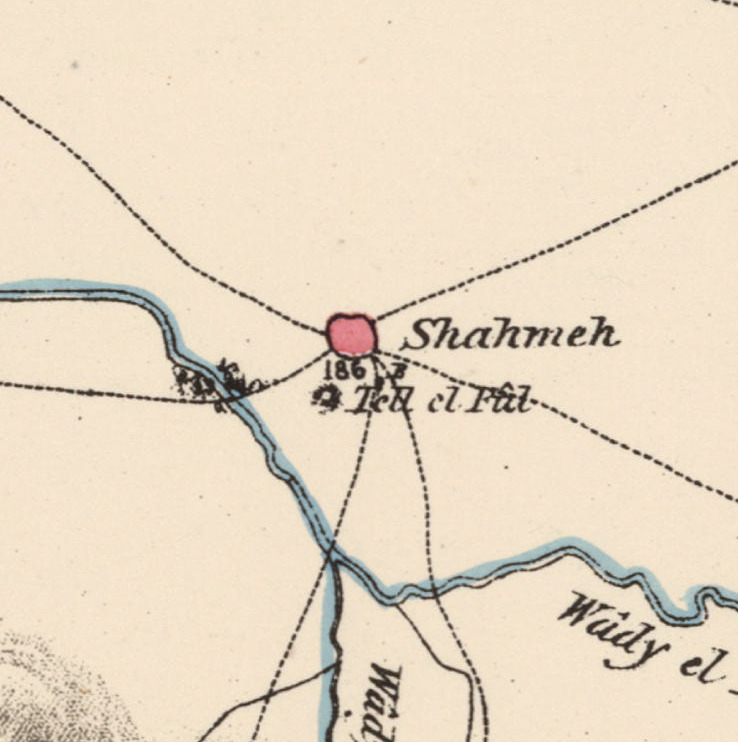
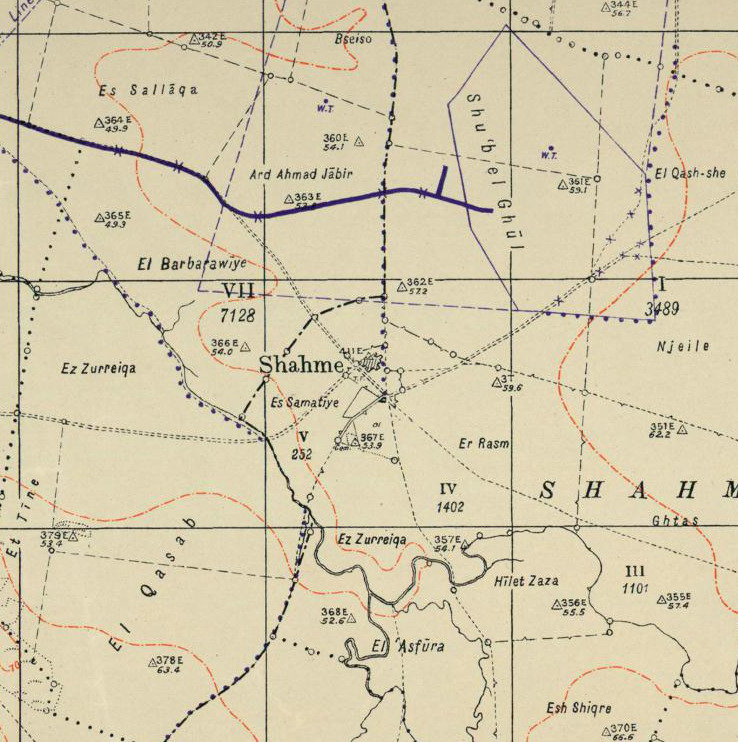
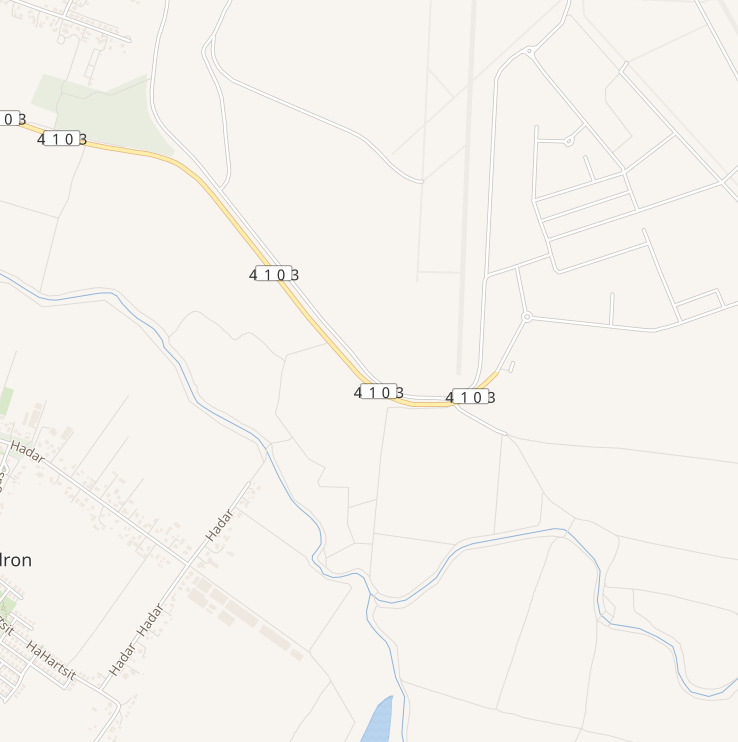
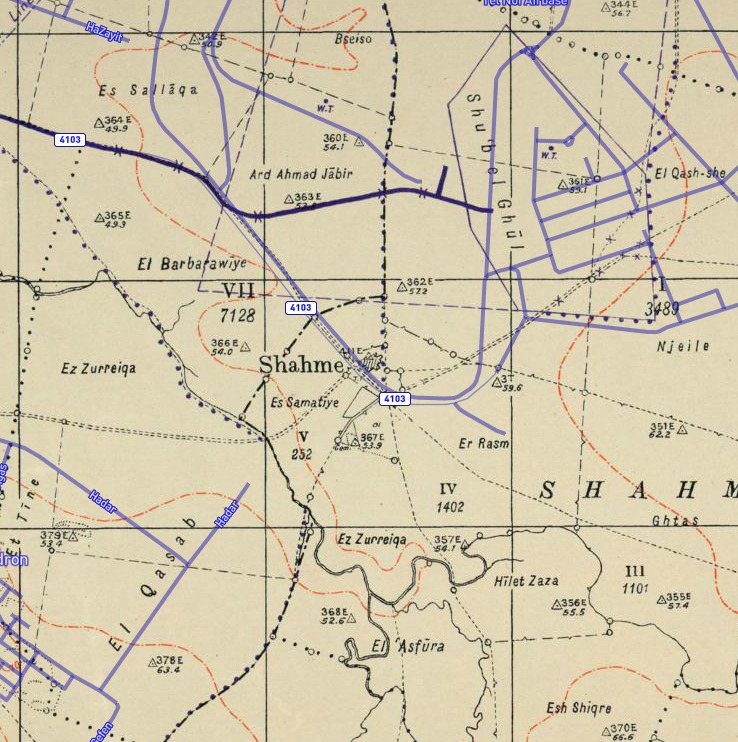
- 1870s map 1940s map modern map 1940s with modern overlay map A series of historical maps of the area around Shahma (click the buttons)

- Location within Mandatory Palestine
- Coordinates: 31°49′19″N 34°48′48″E
- Palestine grid: 132/136
- Geopolitical entity: Mandatory Palestine
- Subdistrict: Ramle
- Date of depopulation: May 14, 1948

Area
  - Total: 6,875 dunams (6.875 km^{2}; 2.654 sq mi)

Population (1945)
  - Total: 280
- Cause(s) of depopulation: Influence of nearby town's fall

Shahma (Arabic: شحمة) was a Palestinian Arab village located 15 kilometers (9.3 mi) southwest of Ramla. Depopulated on the eve of the 1948 Arab-Israeli war, the village lands today form part of a fenced-in area used by the Israeli Air Force.

== Location ==
The village was situated on the coastal plain, 15 kilometers (9.3 mi) southwest of Ramla, in a flat area that was slightly higher that the terrain to the south and southeast. Wadi al-Sarar ran about 1 kilometer (0.62 mi) southwest of it, and a secondary road linked Shahma to al-Ramla. During World War II, the British built RAF Aqir military airport just north of the village, Shahma military base lay to the north and east.

== History ==
In 1838, it was noted as a Muslim village, in the Er-Ramleh District.

In 1852 van de Velde passed by Shammeh, and found two old ponds and "traces of high antiquity" there. He further noted that the village belonged to Sheikh Mosleh, of Bayt Jibrin. In 1863, Victor Guérin noted the village just after he had passed a group of ruins, which he called Khirbet Merebba.

An Ottoman village list of about 1870 noted Schahme south east of Yibna, in the District of Ramle. It noted 23 houses and 31 persons, though the population count included men, only.

In 1882, the PEF's Survey of Western Palestine (SWP) described Shahma as a small village built of adobe bricks, whose inhabitants drew their water from a well to the south of the village. On the SWP map drawn by Conder & Kitchener in 1878 the village located southeast of "Yebnah" is called "Shahmeh".

=== British Mandate era ===
In the 1922 census of Palestine conducted by the British Mandate authorities, Shameh had a population of 107 inhabitants, all Muslims, increasing in the 1931 census to 150, still all Muslims, in a total of 34 houses.

The village was classified as a hamlet by the Palestine Index Gazetteer. It was divided into two sections, north and south of a secondary road. Some of its houses were built in part with stone remains from previous settlements.

In the 1945 statistics the village had a population of 280, all Muslims with a total of 6,875 dunums of land. A total of 152 dunums of village land was used for citrus and bananas, 4,911 dunums were used for cereals, 33 dunums were irrigated or used for orchards, while 11 dunams were classified as built-up public areas.

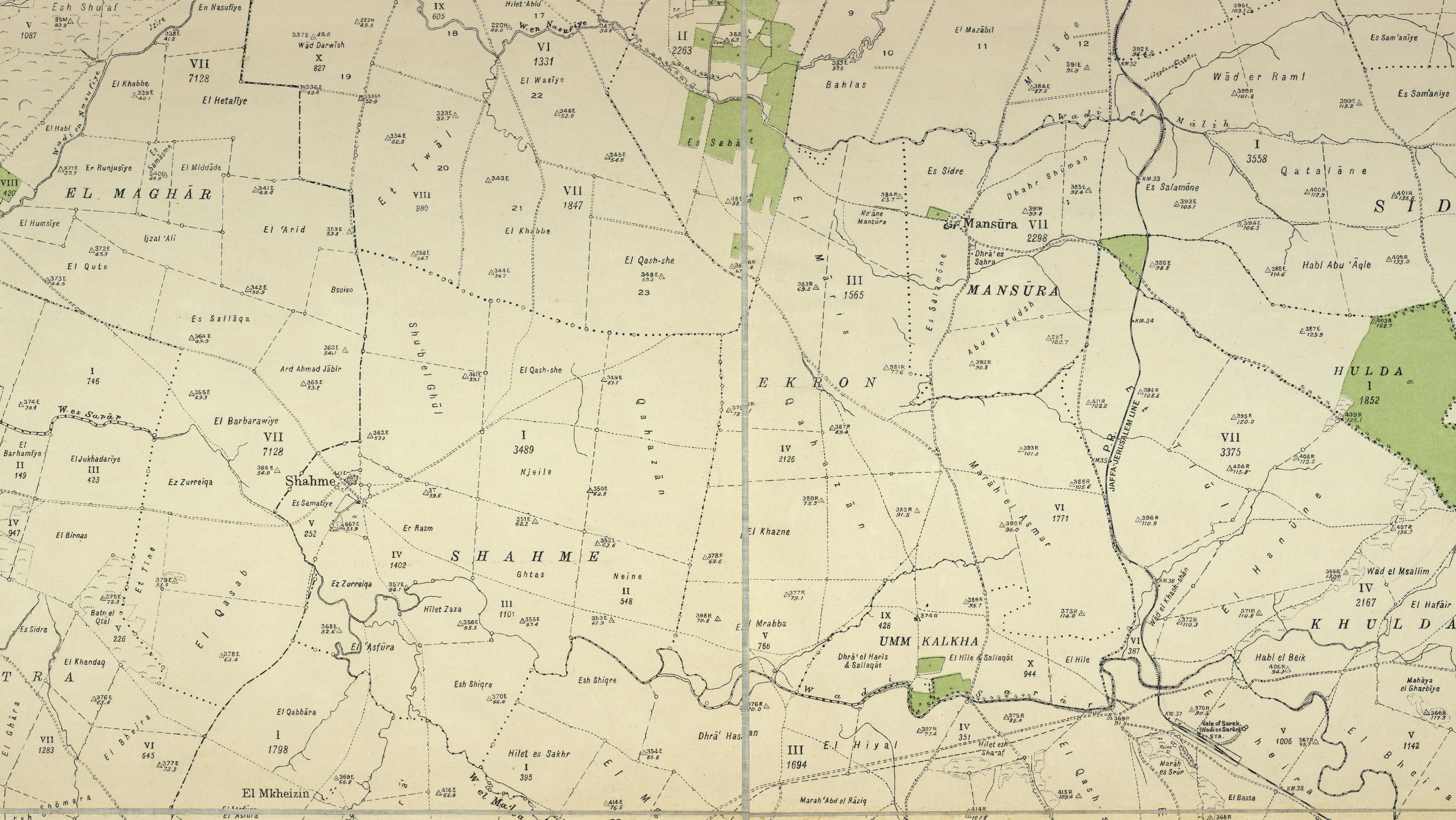
Shahma (Shahme) 1930 1:20,000

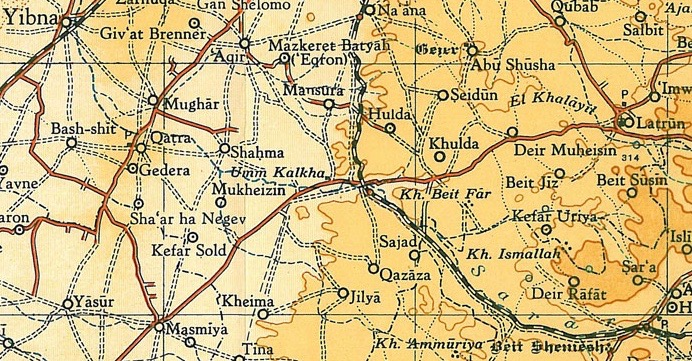
Shahma 1945 1:250,000

=== 1948, and aftermath ===
The Palestinian historian Walid Khalidi described the place in 1992: "The site has been incorporated into a fenced-in military airfield. It is marked by cactuses and bushes that are visible from the outside."

== See also ==
- Depopulated Palestinian locations in Israel

== Bibliography ==
- Barron, J. B., ed. (1923). Palestine: Report and General Abstracts of the Census of 1922. Government of Palestine.
- Conder, C.R.; Kitchener, H.H. (1882). The Survey of Western Palestine: Memoirs of the Topography, Orography, Hydrography, and Archaeology. Vol. 2. London: Committee of the Palestine Exploration Fund.
- Department of Statistics (1945). Village Statistics, April, 1945. Government of Palestine.
- Guérin, V. (1869). Description Géographique Historique et Archéologique de la Palestine (in French). Vol. 1: Judee, pt. 2. Paris: L'Imprimerie Nationale.
- Hadawi, S. (1970). Village Statistics of 1945: A Classification of Land and Area ownership in Palestine. Palestine Liberation Organization Research Center.
- Hartmann, M. (1883). "Die Ortschaftenliste des Liwa Jerusalem in dem türkischen Staatskalender für Syrien auf das Jahr 1288 der Flucht (1871)". Zeitschrift des Deutschen Palästina-Vereins. 6: 102–149.
- Khalidi, W. (1992). All That Remains: The Palestinian Villages Occupied and Depopulated by Israel in 1948. Washington D.C.: Institute for Palestine Studies. ISBN 0-88728-224-5.
- Mills, E., ed. (1932). Census of Palestine 1931. Population of Villages, Towns and Administrative Areas. Jerusalem: Government of Palestine.
- Morris, B. (2004). The Birth of the Palestinian Refugee Problem Revisited. Cambridge University Press. ISBN 978-0-521-00967-6.
- Palmer, E.H. (1881). The Survey of Western Palestine: Arabic and English Name Lists Collected During the Survey by Lieutenants Conder and Kitchener, R. E. Transliterated and Explained by E.H. Palmer. Committee of the Palestine Exploration Fund.
- Robinson, E.; Smith, E. (1841). Biblical Researches in Palestine, Mount Sinai and Arabia Petraea: A Journal of Travels in the year 1838. Vol. 3. Boston: Crocker & Brewster.
- Socin, A (1879). "Alphabetisches Verzeichniss von Ortschaften des Paschalik Jerusalem". Zeitschrift des Deutschen Palästina-Vereins. 2: 135–163.
- Velde, van de, C.W.M. (1854). Narrative of a journey through Syria and Palestine in 1851 and 1852. Vol. 2. William Blackwood and son.
