= Sheydan, Chaharmahal and Bakhtiari =

Sheydan شيدان
- Village
- Location within Iran
- Coordinates: 31°30′48″N 50°47′35″E
- Country: Iran
- Province: Chaharmahal and Bakhtiari
- County: Lordegan
- Bakhsh: Central
- Rural District: Milas

Population (2006)
  - Total: 83
- Time zone: UTC+3:30 (IRST)
  - Summer (DST): UTC+4:30 (IRDT)

Sheydan (Persian: شيدان, also Romanized as Sheydān) is a village in the Milas Rural District, in the Central District of Lordegan County, Chaharmahal and Bakhtiari Province, Iran. At the 2006 census, its population was 83, made up of 14 families.
