= Saydun =

Saydun صيدون
- Village
- Etymology: from Zidon
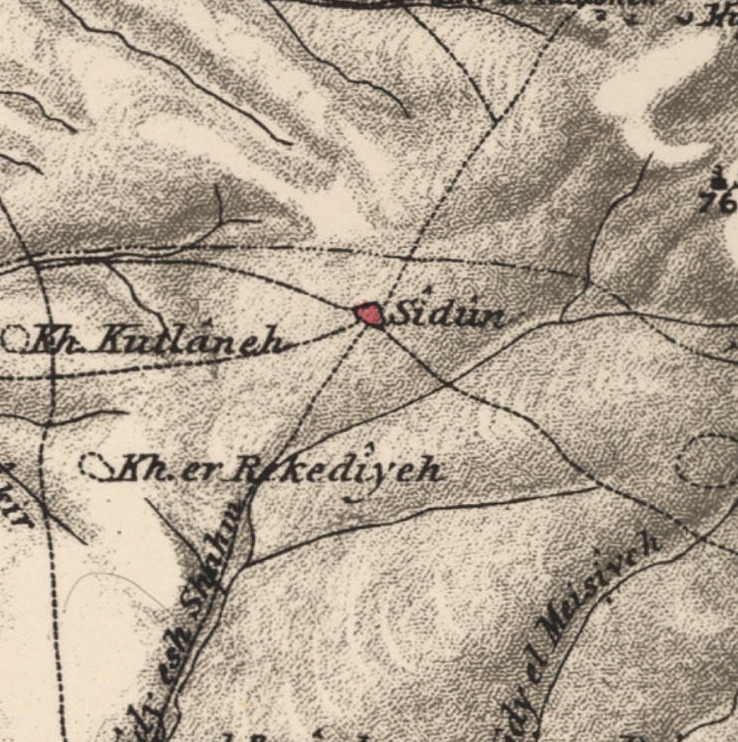
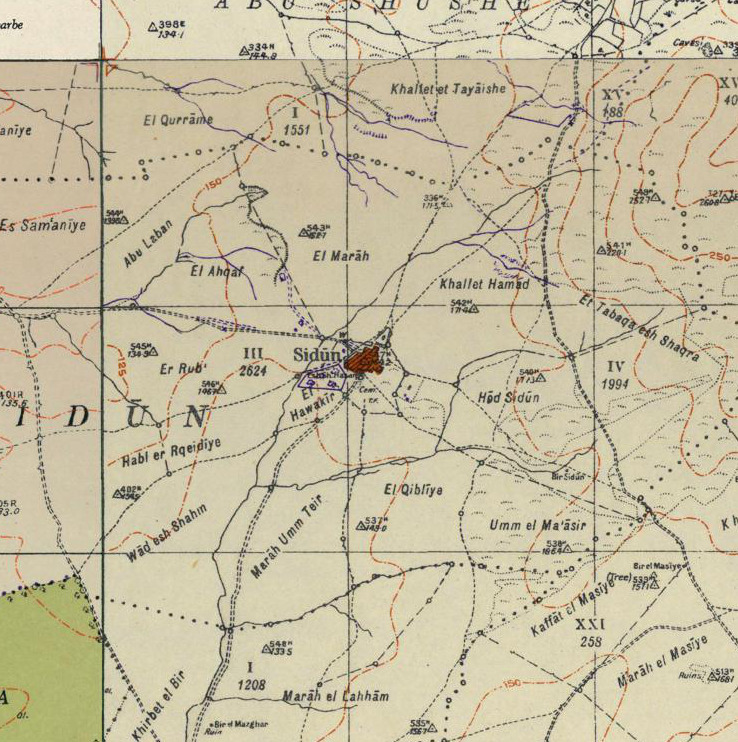
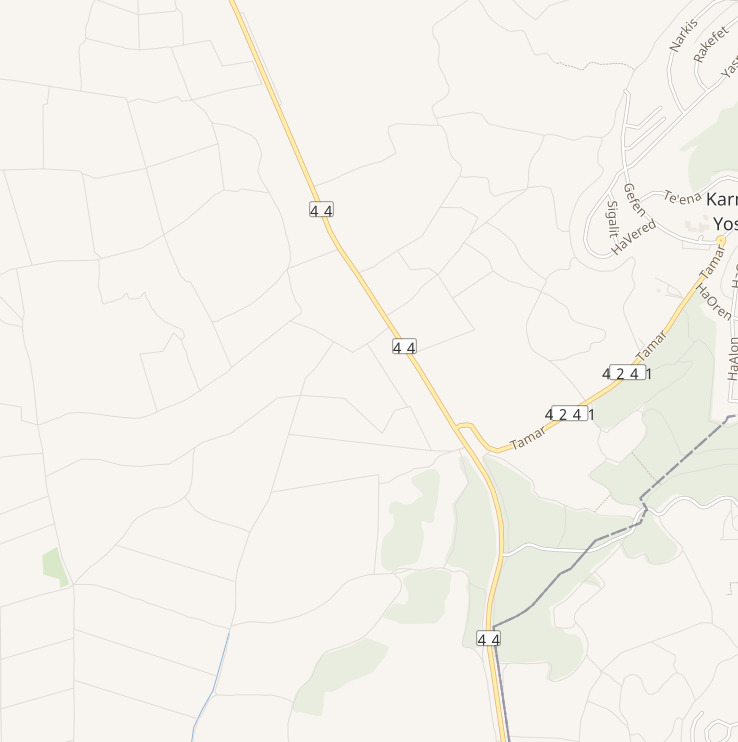
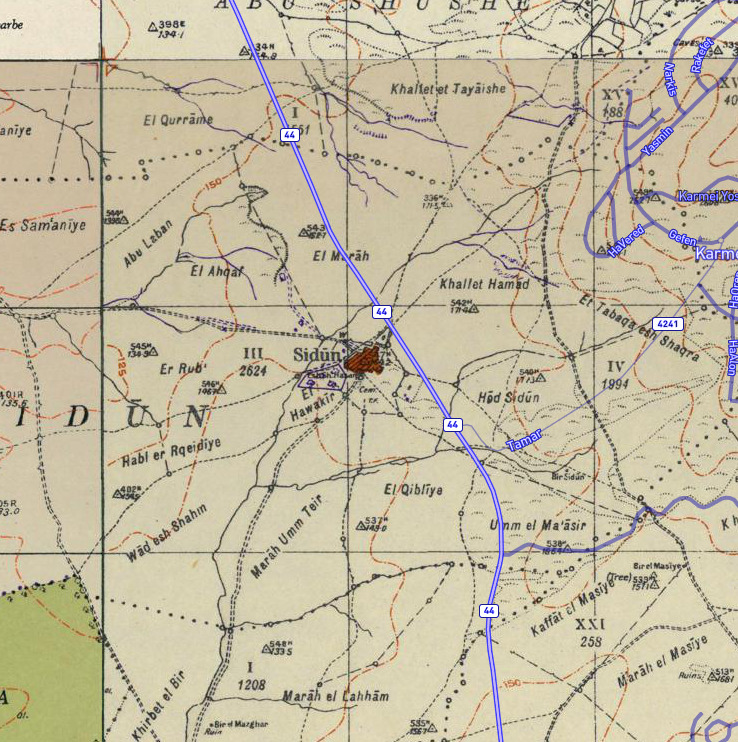
- 1870s map 1940s map modern map 1940s with modern overlay map A series of historical maps of the area around Saydun (click the buttons)

- Location within Mandatory Palestine
- Coordinates: 31°50′28″N 34°54′17″E
- Palestine grid: 141/138
- Geopolitical entity: Mandatory Palestine
- Subdistrict: Ramle
- Date of depopulation: not known

Population (1945)
  - Total: 210

Saydun (Arabic: صيدون) was a Palestinian village in the Ramle Subdistrict of Mandatory Palestine. It was depopulated during the 1947–48 Civil War in Mandatory Palestine on April 6, 1948, during Operation Nachshon. It was located 9 km south of Ramla on the east bank of Wadi Saydun.

== History ==
In 1838, it was noted as a large village whose inhabitants were Muslim.

In 1863 Victor Guérin found it to have about 200 inhabitants, He further noted: "Sitting on a low hill, [] the houses are built of adobe. Lacking wood and coal, the Arabs of this locality, as well as many others in Palestine, make fire with sun-dried cow dung in the shape of rounded clods. They feed on water at a well of modern date, because the ancient well is dry." "This village [] must certainly succeed an ancient village".

An Ottoman village list from about 1870 counted 35 houses and a population of 148, though the population count included men, only.

In 1882, the PEF's Survey of Western Palestine described the place as: "a small village of the same class" (as Shahma).

=== British Mandate era ===
In the 1922 census of Palestine conducted by the British Mandate authorities, Saidum had a population of 124 inhabitants, all Muslims, increasing in the 1931 census to 174, still all Muslims, in a total of 35 houses.

In the 1945 statistics the village had a population of 210 Muslims with a total of 7,487 dunums of land. 49 dunums of land was used for plantations and irrigable land, 5,247 dunums were used for cereals, while 15 dunams were classified as built-up public areas.

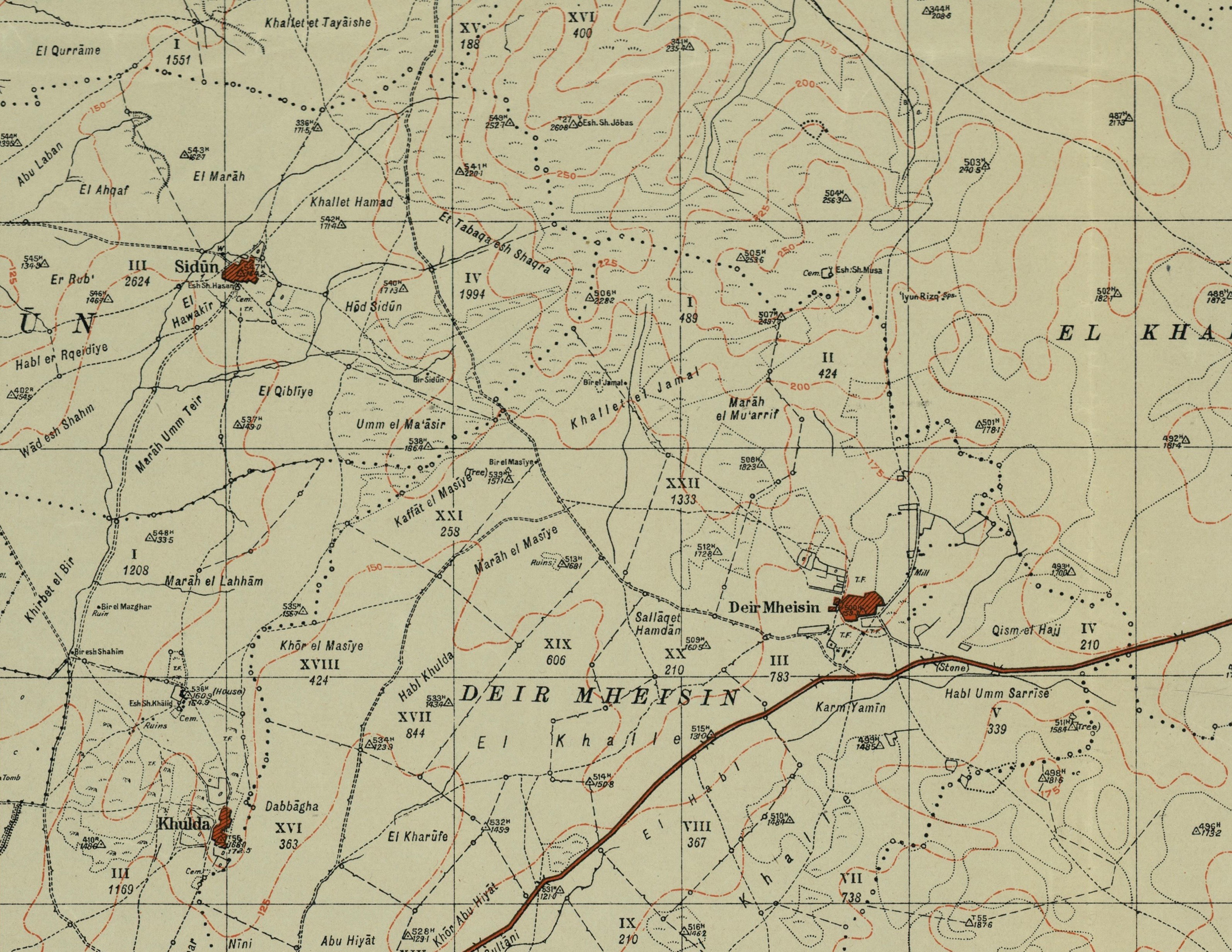
Saydun (Sidun) 1942 1:20,000

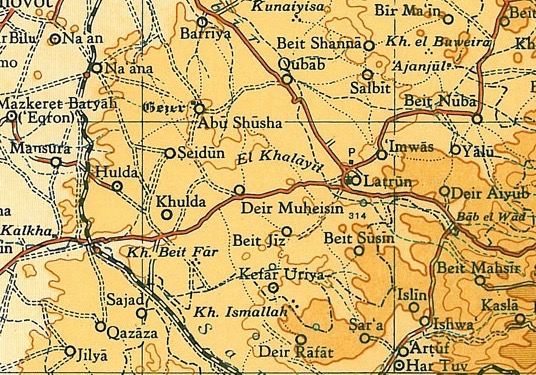
Saydun (Seidun) 1945 1:250,000

=== Post 1948 ===
In 1992 the village site was described: "Cactuses and numerous grapevines grow on the site. Only one stone house remains; it has a flat roof and a round-arched door and is used for storage. The surrounding land are used for agriculture by Israelis."

== Bibliography ==
- Barron, J. B., ed. (1923). Palestine: Report and General Abstracts of the Census of 1922. Government of Palestine.
- Conder, C.R.; Kitchener, H.H. (1882). The Survey of Western Palestine: Memoirs of the Topography, Orography, Hydrography, and Archaeology. Vol. 2. London: Committee of the Palestine Exploration Fund.
- Department of Statistics (1945). Village Statistics, April, 1945. Government of Palestine.
- Guérin, V. (1869). Description Géographique Historique et Archéologique de la Palestine (in French). Vol. 1: Judee, pt. 2. Paris: L'Imprimerie Nationale.
- Hadawi, S. (1970). Village Statistics of 1945: A Classification of Land and Area ownership in Palestine. Palestine Liberation Organization Research Center.
- Hartmann, M. (1883). "Die Ortschaftenliste des Liwa Jerusalem in dem türkischen Staatskalender für Syrien auf das Jahr 1288 der Flucht (1871)". Zeitschrift des Deutschen Palästina-Vereins. 6: 102–149.
- Khalidi, W. (1992). All That Remains: The Palestinian Villages Occupied and Depopulated by Israel in 1948. Washington D.C.: Institute for Palestine Studies. ISBN 0-88728-224-5.
- Mills, E., ed. (1932). Census of Palestine 1931. Population of Villages, Towns and Administrative Areas. Jerusalem: Government of Palestine.
- Morris, B. (2004). The Birth of the Palestinian Refugee Problem Revisited. Cambridge University Press. ISBN 978-0-521-00967-6.
- Palmer, E.H. (1881). The Survey of Western Palestine: Arabic and English Name Lists Collected During the Survey by Lieutenants Conder and Kitchener, R. E. Transliterated and Explained by E.H. Palmer. Committee of the Palestine Exploration Fund.
- Robinson, E.; Smith, E. (1841). Biblical Researches in Palestine, Mount Sinai and Arabia Petraea: A Journal of Travels in the year 1838. Vol. 3. Boston: Crocker & Brewster.
- Socin, A. (1879). "Alphabetisches Verzeichniss von Ortschaften des Paschalik Jerusalem". Zeitschrift des Deutschen Palästina-Vereins. 2: 135–163.
