= Shidan, Isfahan =

Shidan شيدان
- Village
- Location within Iran
- Coordinates: 32°29′02″N 51°51′36″E
- Country: Iran
- Province: Isfahan
- County: Isfahan
- Bakhsh: Central
- Rural District: Baraan-e Jonubi

Population (2006)
  - Total: 534
- Time zone: UTC+3:30 (IRST)
  - Summer (DST): UTC+4:30 (IRDT)

Shidan (Persian: شيدان, also Romanized as Shīdān and Sheydān; also known as Seyyedūn and Sīdun) is a village in Baraan-e Jonubi Rural District, in the Central District of Isfahan County, Isfahan Province, Iran. At the 2006 census, its population was 534, in 145 families.
