= Yehiam convoy attack =

Convoy of equipment belonging to the Carmeli Brigade - War 1948

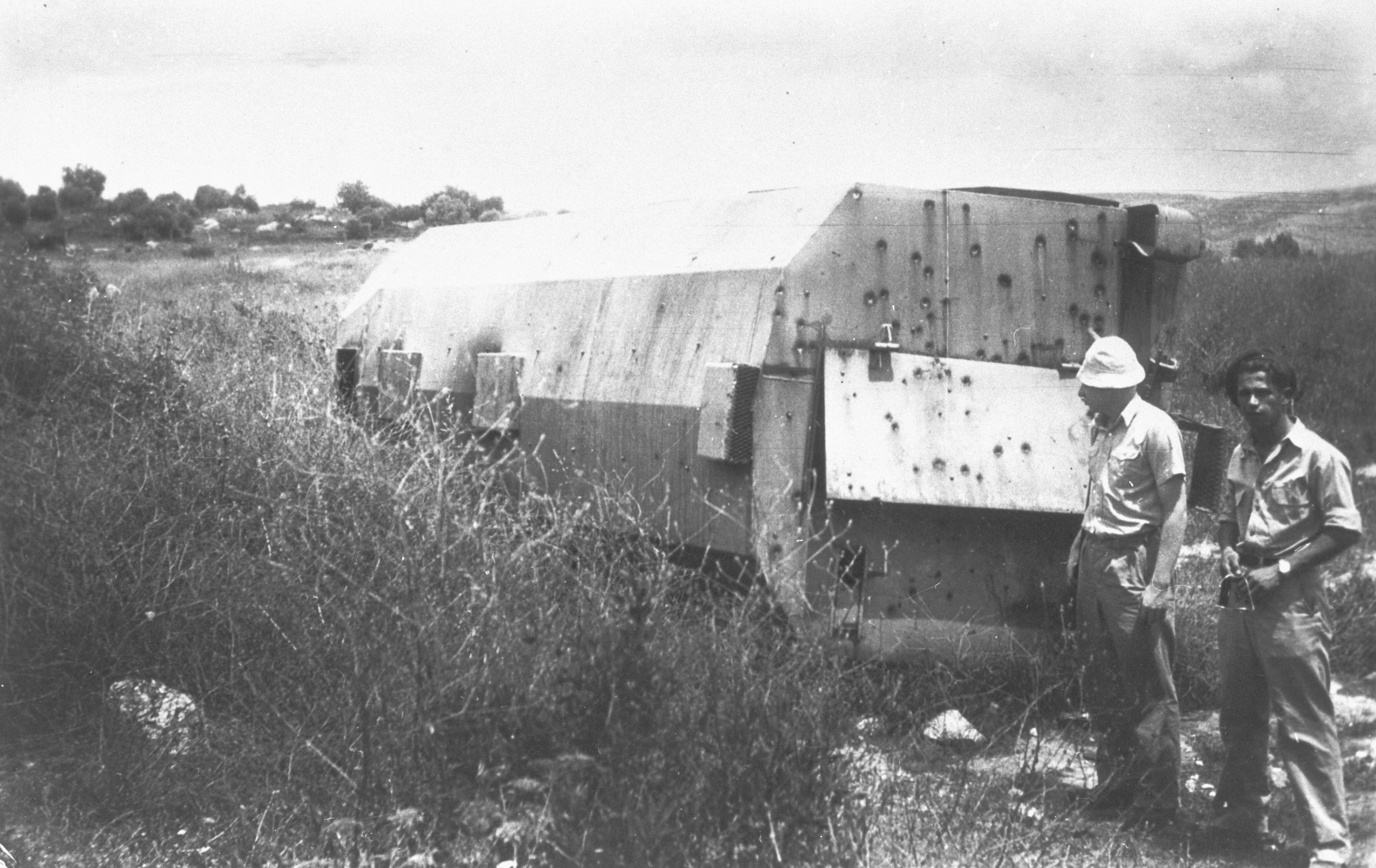
An overturned armoured vehicle after the attack

The Yehiam convoy attack occurred on March 27, 1948, during the 1947–48 Civil War in Mandatory Palestine. A Haganah convoy had been sent from Haifa to reinforce and re-supply the kibbutz of Yehiam which was under attack by Arab forces. The convoy was ambushed and 47 Haganah personnel were killed.

== Background ==
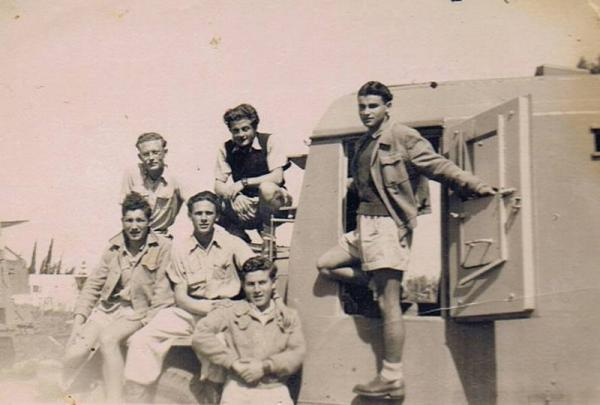
Members of convoy before departure

Ben Ami Pachter (born 1919) planned to lead a convoy on 21 March 1948, from Kiryat Haim near Haifa because supplies were short and the defenders of Kibbutz Yehiam were running out of ammunition. The 1947 United Nations Partition Plan for Palestine put Yehi'am within the limits of the Arab state rather than the Jewish one. The original date had to be postponed as word reached that many enemy troops were deployed along the route.

== Attack ==
On 27 March 1948, seven trucks, loaded with supplies and personnel, set off. Obstacles in the way forced the convoy to proceed slowly. As the convoy neared al-Kabri, the convoy's seven trucks were ambushed. From both sides of the road, the bushes exploded with bullets. Ben Ami Pachter, who was in the lead car, shouted to those behind that it was an ambush and that they should get out any way they could. After giving the warning, he was struck in the head by a bullet. The armoured car, with his body and others who were wounded, reached Yehiam shortly afterwards.

The Scotsman published an account of the convoy ambush:

The second ambush occurred at Kabri, near Naharia, seven miles north of Acre. Here the bodies of 42 Jews were found near five burnt out lorries. It is stated that in this action a column of six Jewish lorries were ambushed by 250 Arabs who were armed with rifles, two inch mortars, and light machine guns. The column, escorted by an armoured car, was attacked an hour before sunset on Saturday night. A British flying column was sent to relieve the Jews but failed to reach them, it is reported. British artillery then opened fire with 12-lb and 25-lb high-explosive shells, and the Arabs withdrew.

In the ambush, 47 Haganah members and six Arabs were killed. Serious allegations were made against the Carmeli Brigade commander that he had not rushed to the aid of the Yehiam convoy.

== Aftermath ==
During the second phase of Operation Ben Ami, the Arab siege of Yehi'am was lifted and the first retaliatory attack was carried out against al-Kabri, Umm al-Faraj and al-Nahr, where the commander gave orders “To attack with the aim of capturing the villages of al-Kabri, Umm al-Faraj and al-Nahr, to kill the men [and] to destroy and set fire to the villages.”

During Operation Dekel, the 7th Brigade and 21st Battalion of the Carmeli Brigade carried out an attack on Kuweikat on 9 July 1948, believing that some of the inhabitants had taken part in the attack on the Yehi'am convoy. The barrage was particularly heavy. The handful of Kuweikat villagers (mostly elderly) who had stayed put when the village fell were subsequently expelled to the neighbouring Druze village of Abu Sinan. The Druze village refused to give most of the Kuweikat villagers shelter. Subsequently the Kuweikat villagers moved to Upper Galilee and Lebanon.

== Gallery ==
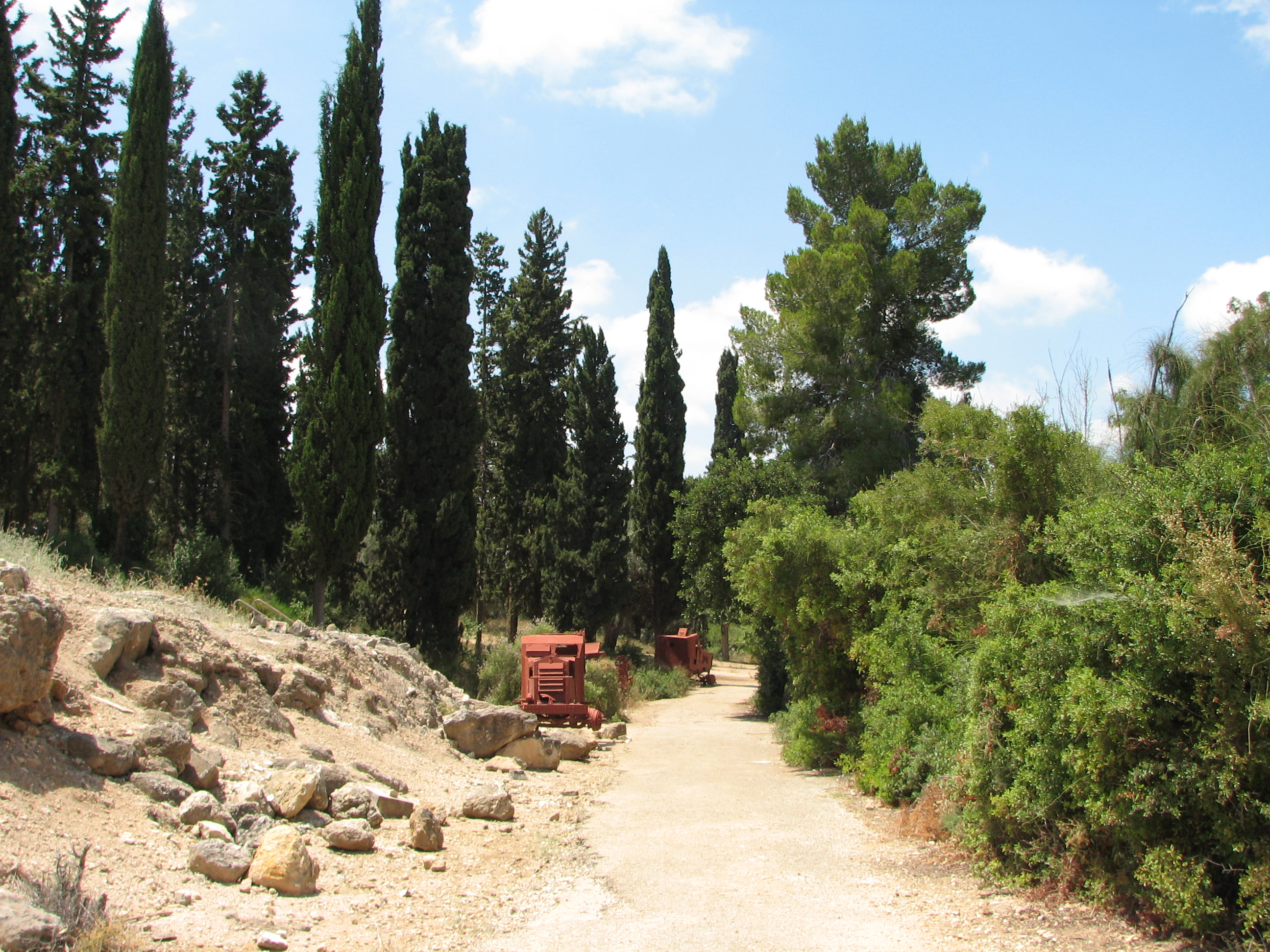
Yehiam convoy memorial

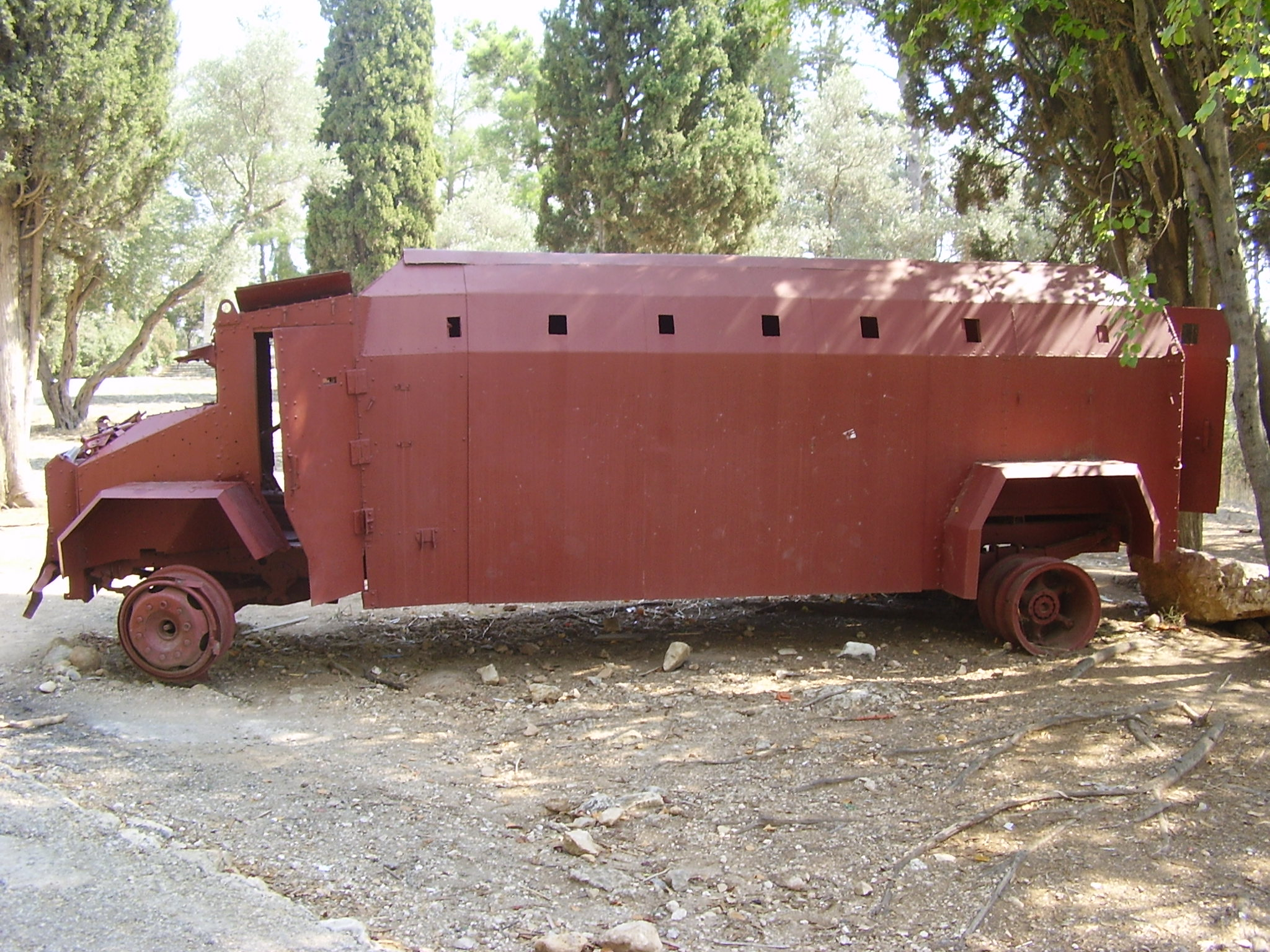
Armored bus Yehiam Convoy memorial.

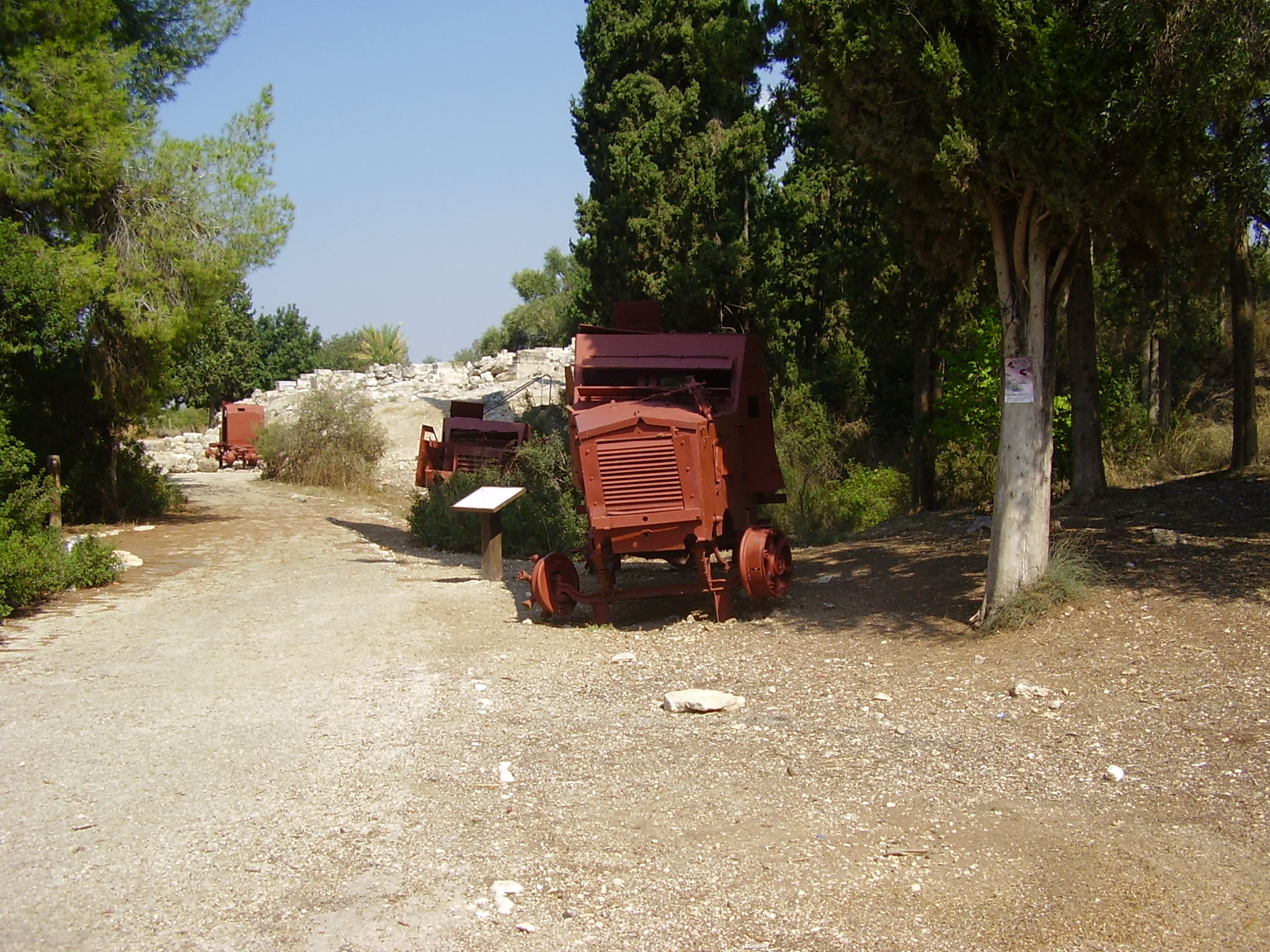
Yehiam convoy memorial.

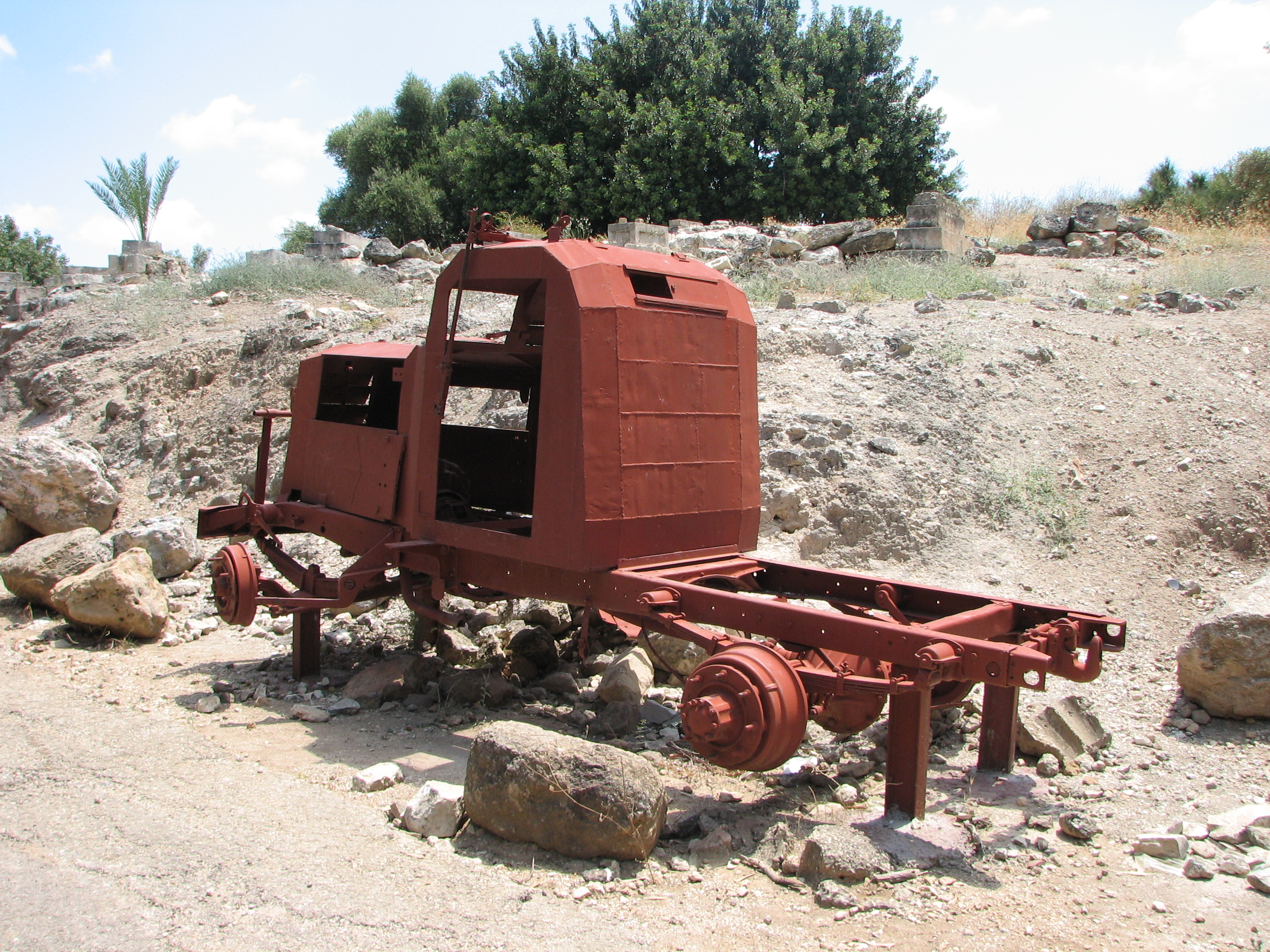
Yehiam Convoy memorial

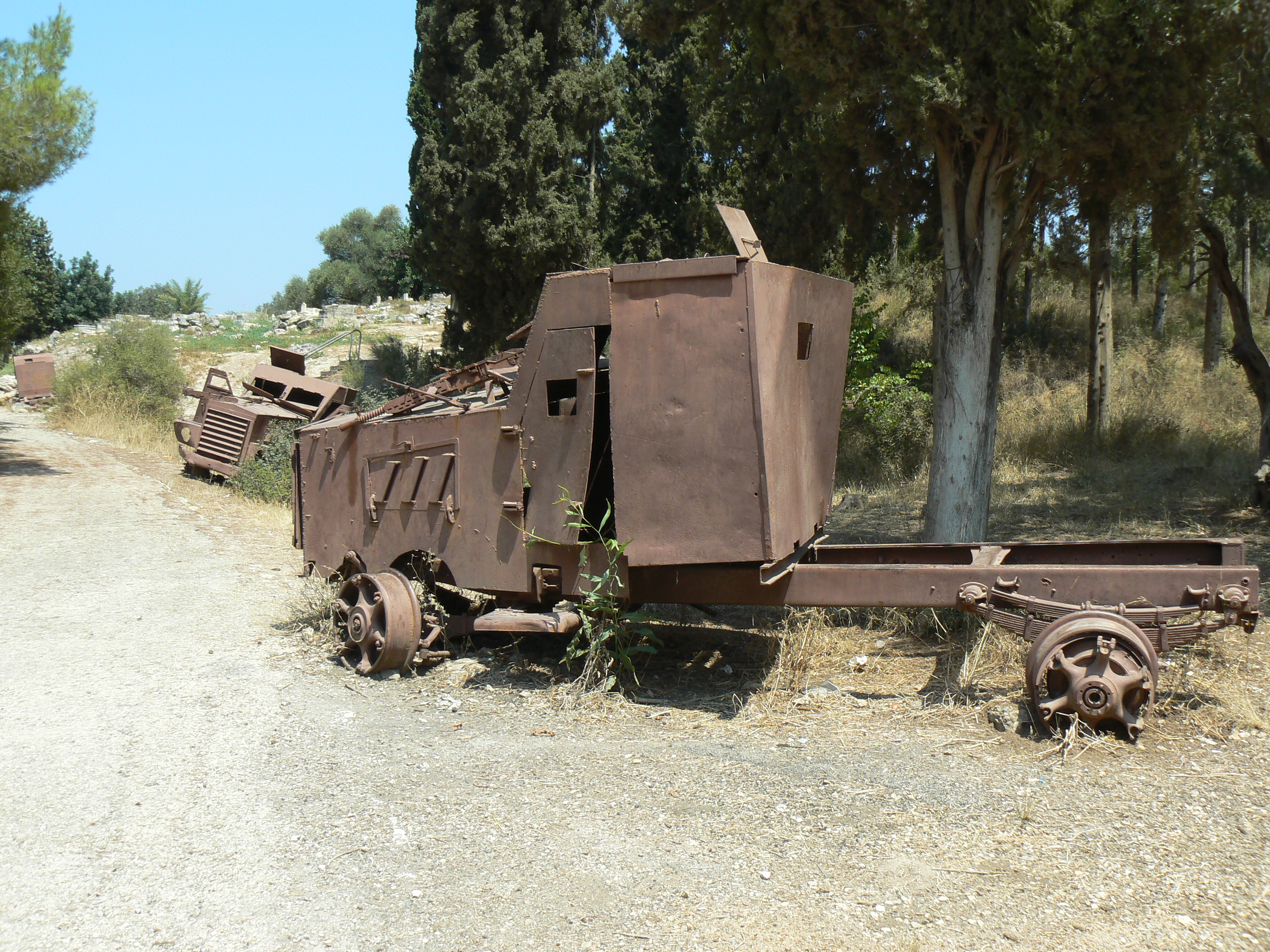
Yehiam Convoy memorial

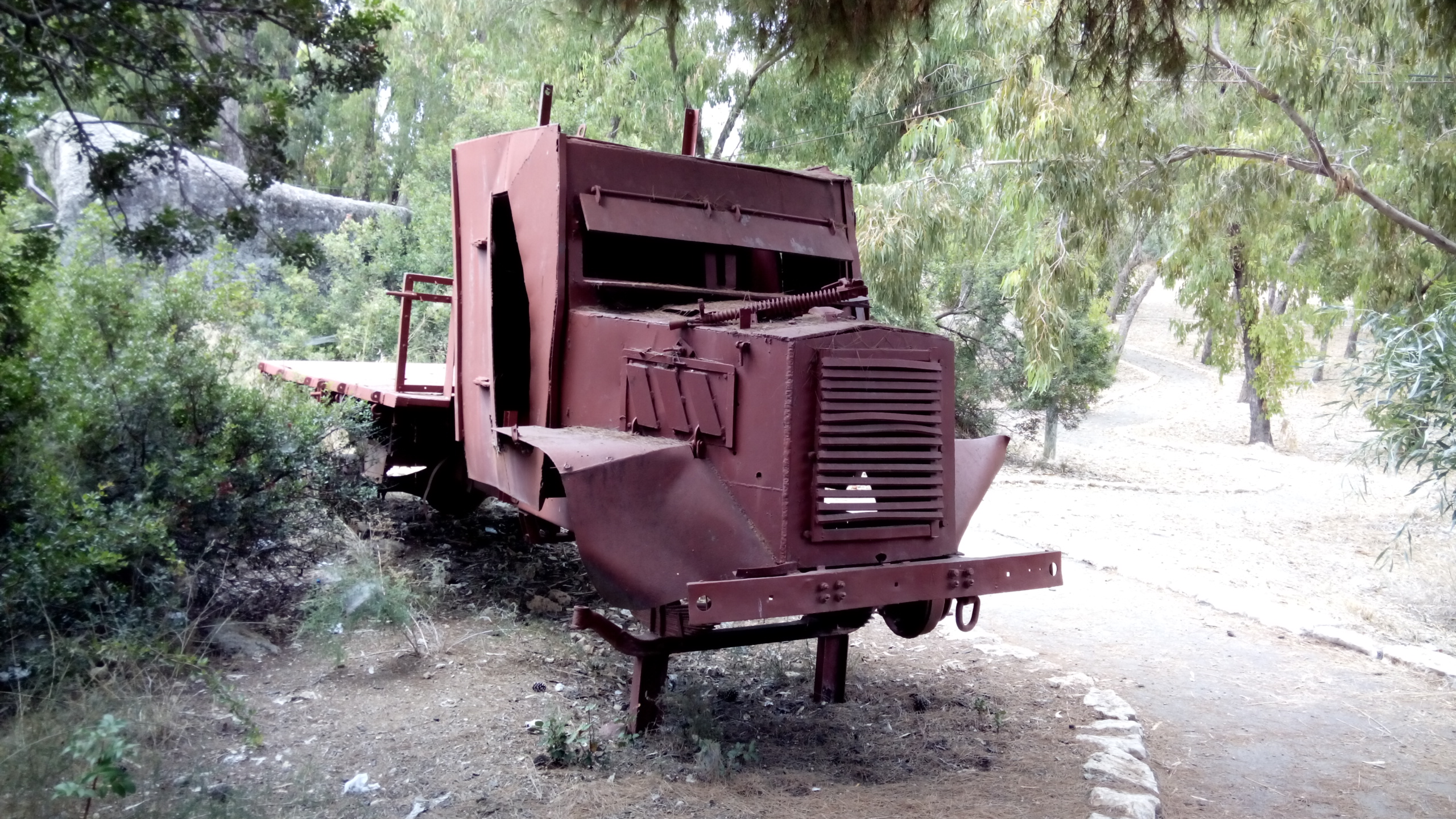
Yehiam Convoy memorial

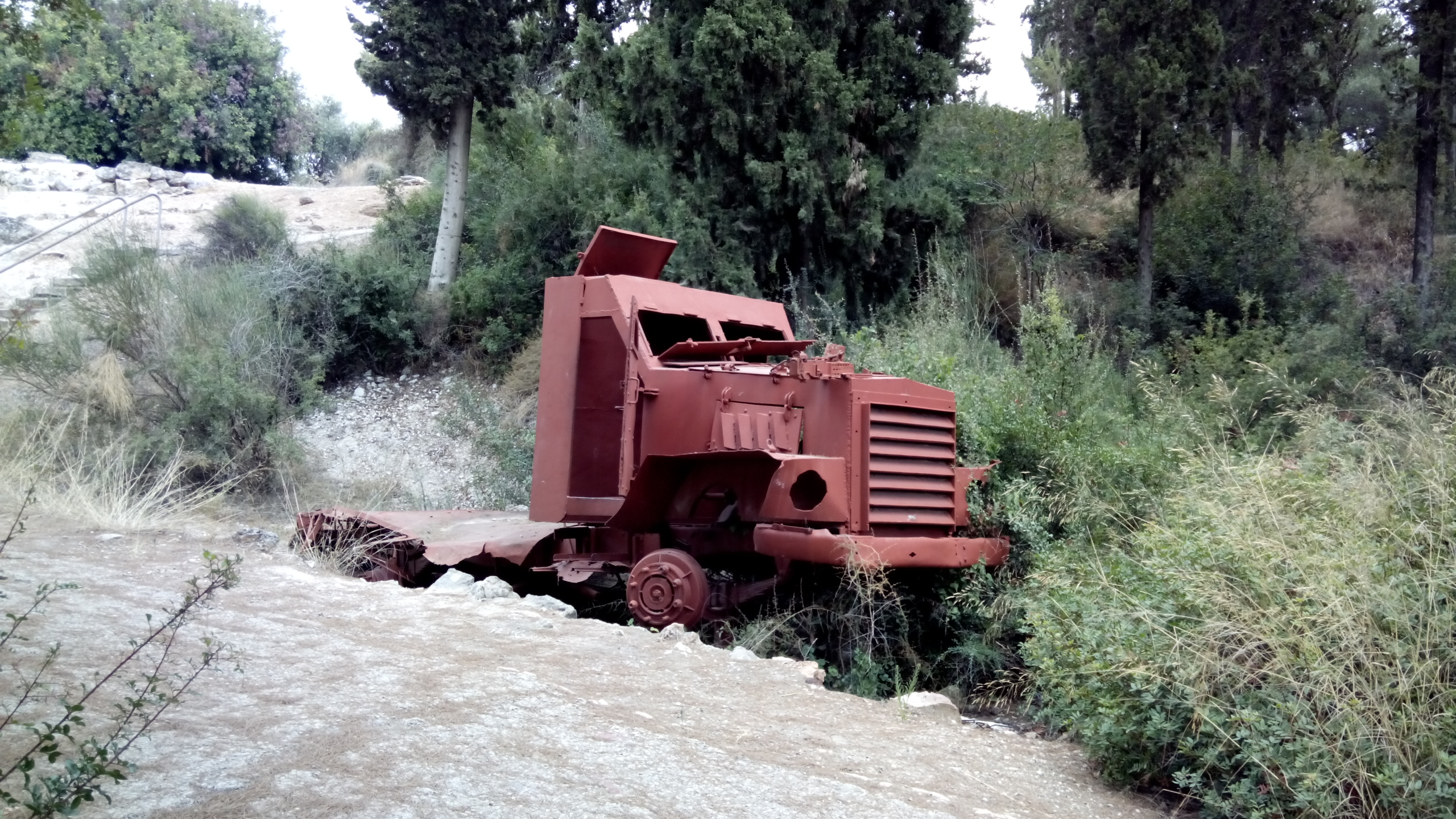
Yehiam Convoy memorial

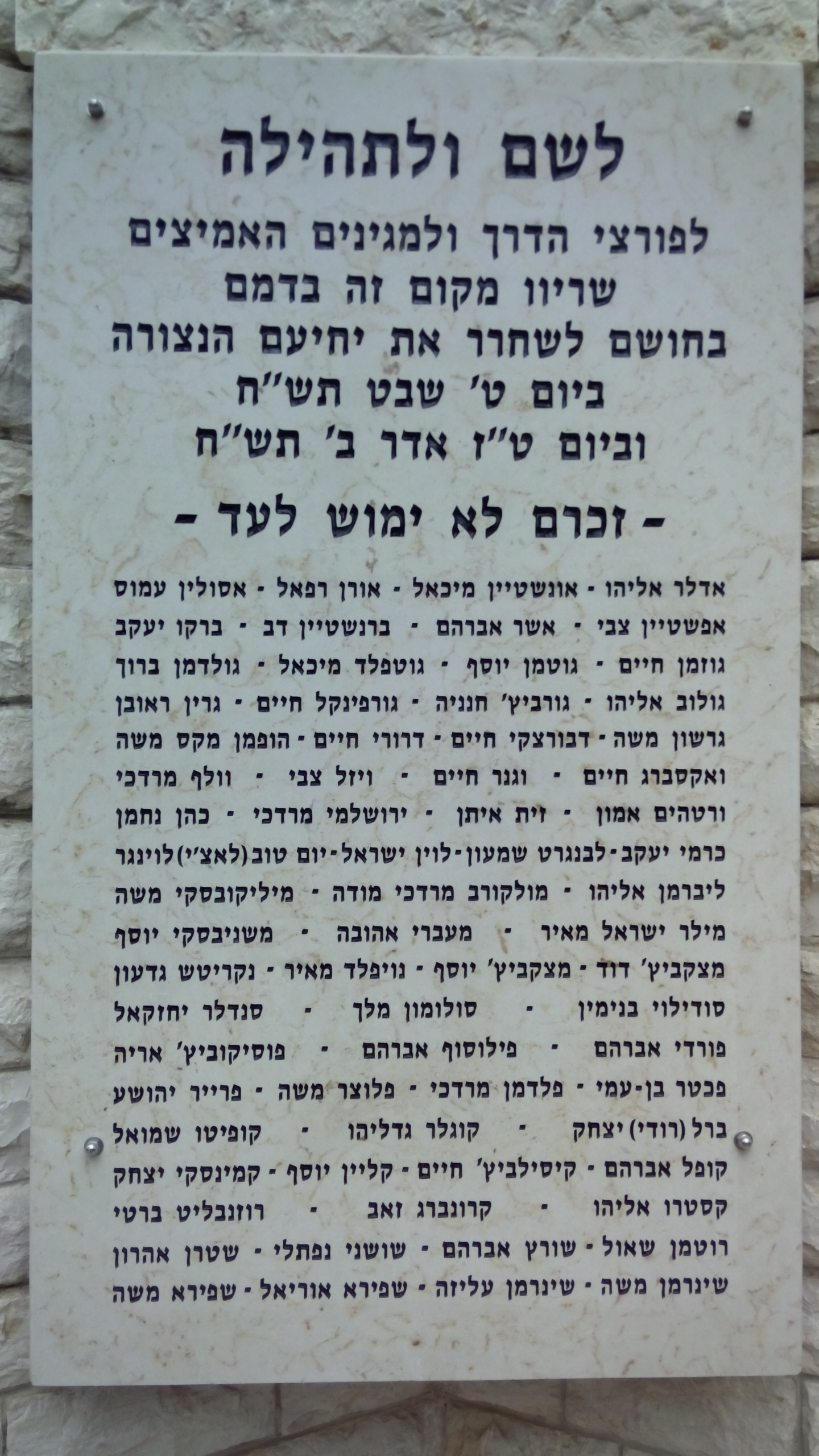
Yehiam Convoy memorial

== Bibliography ==
- Benvenisti, Meron (2000): Sacred Landscape: Buried History of the Holy Land Since 1948. University of California Press. ISBN 0-520-21154-5, ( page 178(?), p.138 ff, )
- Morris, Benny (2004), The Birth of the Palestinian Refugee Problem Revisited, Cambridge University Press, p. 416, ISBN 978-0-521-00967-6
