= 188th Armored Brigade =

Unit of the Israel Defense Forces

188th Barak Armor Brigade
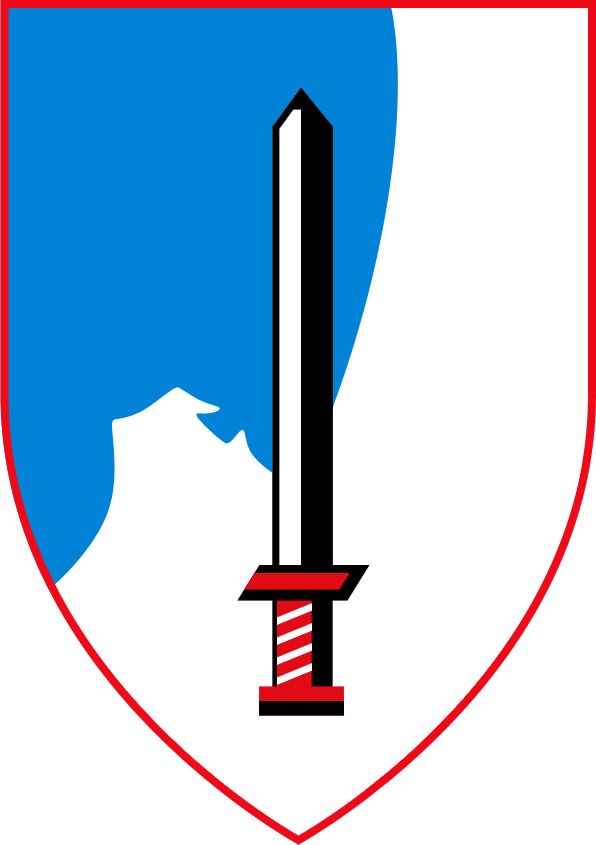
- The Barak Brigade's insignia
- Active: 1967–present
- Country: Israel
- Allegiance: Israel Defense Forces
- Branch: Armored Corps
- Type: Armor
- Part of: Northern Command
- Mottos: ברק בעיניים (Lightning in the eyes)
- Engagements: Operation Hiram; Six-Day War; Yom Kippur War; 1982 Lebanon War; 2014 Israel–Gaza conflict; Gaza war; 2024 Israeli invasion of Lebanon

The 188th "Barak" (Lightning) Armored Brigade is an Israeli armoured brigade, subordinate to Israel's Northern Regional Command. The emblem of the Barak Armored Brigade is a red-bordered rhombus bearing a sword against a blue and white background depicting the Haifa coastline. The brigade has a long history beginning before the foundation of the State of Israel.

In 1990 the brigade was the first to adopt the Merkava mark-III main battle tank, phasing out its older Centurion tanks. The brigade phased out the mark-III in 2020 in favor of the mark-IVs.

== History ==
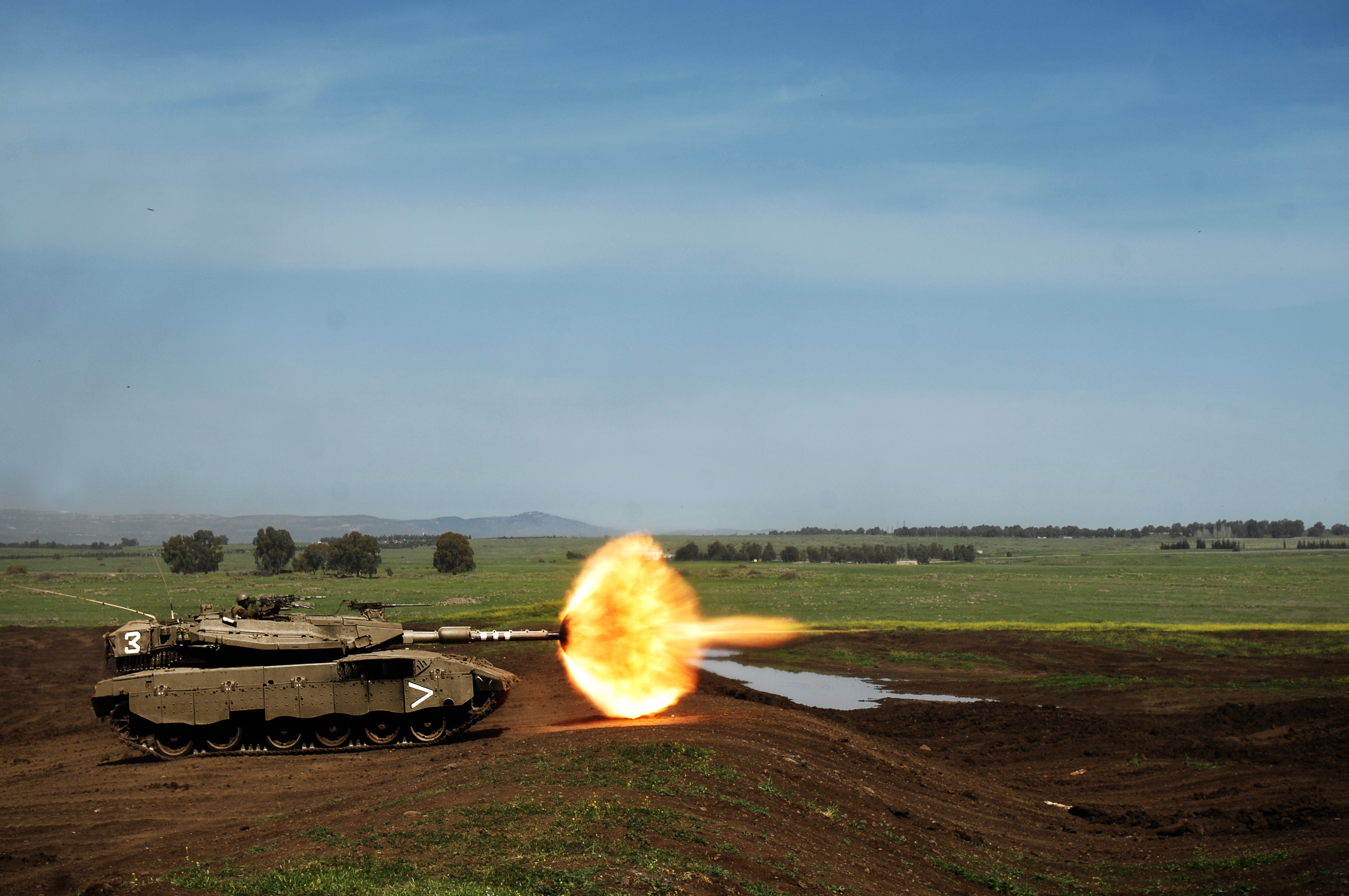
A tank during a training day held in the Golan Heights for the 188th Armored Brigade

The emblem of the Carmeli Brigade

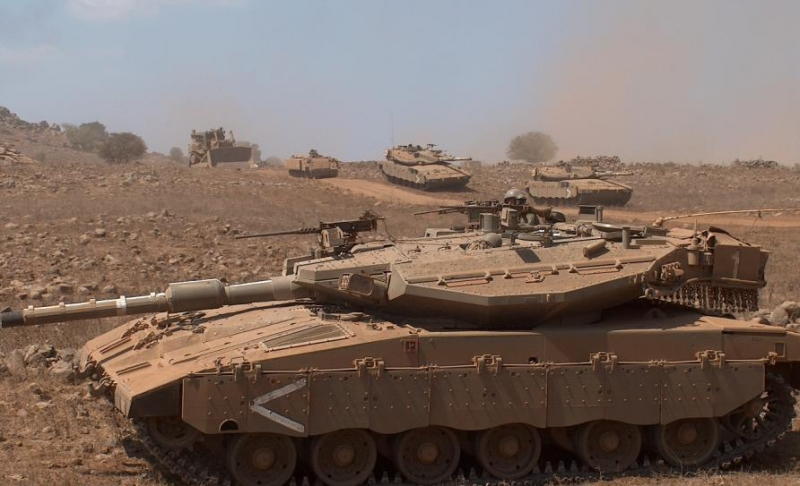
A Merkava Mk.3 company in training, northern Israel.

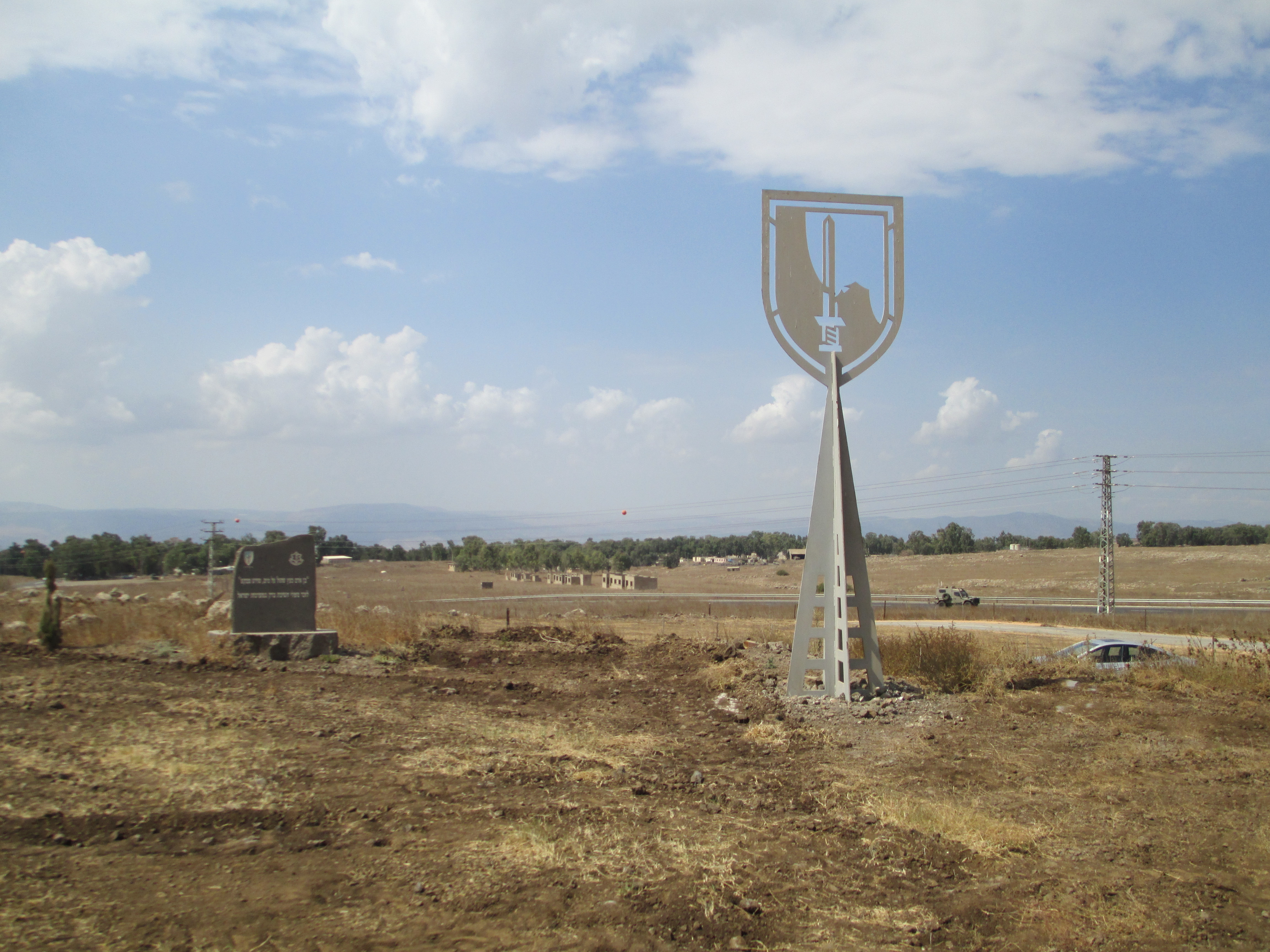
A memorial in the Golan Heights

The brigade was formed as the 2nd Brigade during the 1948 Arab-Israeli war when it was split off from the Levanoni Brigade. Named the Carmeli Brigade because it was led by Moshe Carmel, the brigade was an infantry formation operating in northern Israel. It played an important part in Operation Hiram. After the IDF was formed, the Carmeli Brigade became its 18th Brigade.

During the Sinai Campaign of 1956, the brigade was stationed along the Jordanian border, in case the Jordanians decided to open a second front, and so was not involved in combat. It was shortly later assigned armoured units to become the 45th Armored Brigade, also known as the "Barak Armored Brigade". It consisted of one tank battalion, two armoured infantry battalions, a mortar battalion and reconnaissance units. The changeover was completed in 1962.

During the Yom Kippur War, it played an important role in defending Israel's border against the Syrian attack in the southern Golan Heights. 112 soldiers were killed in action, including the brigade commander. The brigade was almost destroyed. The main Syrian attack at 2:30–2:50 PM, confronted by the newly positioned 74th Tank Battalion, under the command of Lt.Col. Yair Nafshi. Nafshi moved his battalion position 1.5 km forward from its previous defensive position, a maneuver that saved his men and machines from the Syrian artillery barrage.

His was the only remaining tank force, equipped with 36 Israeli modified Centurion tanks to fight the Syrians for 3 continuous days until reinforcements and reserves were moved into positions. His battalion was reinforced with a tank company from the 53rd battalion. After 4 days of fighting, his battalion was reduced to 5 operational tanks. More than 102 soldiers and officers died defending the southern Golan Line, from reinforced points (bunkers) 107 to 114. For his gallant, professional, and courageous behaviour during the war, Yair Nafshi received Israel's second-highest decoration, the Medal of Valor. He retired from the army with the rank of Brigadier General.

During the battle, Lieutenant Zvika Greengold, who had arrived unattached to any unit, fought off attacks with his single tank until help arrived. "For the next 20 hours, Zvika Force, as he came to be known on the radio net, fought running battles with Syrian tanks—sometimes alone, sometimes as part of a larger unit, changing tanks half a dozen times as they were knocked out. He was wounded and burned but stayed in action and repeatedly showed up at critical moments from an unexpected direction to change the course of a skirmish.

After the war, the task of rebuilding the brigade was assigned in part to Yonatan Netanyahu who took command of Battalion 71. In the 1982 Lebanon War, it fought in Beirut and participated in the capture of the local airport. Today, the brigade is part of the 36th Armored Division, the largest regular-service armoured division in the IDF.

During 2014 Gaza War, the unit saw deployment in Gaza City.

During the 2023 Gaza War, the unit saw deployment in Bureij.

== Brigade organization 2025 ==
- 188th Armored Brigade "Barak"
  - 53rd Armored Battalion "Sufa/Tempest" (Merkava Mk.4M)
  - 71st Armored Battalion "Reshef/Flash" (Merkava Mk.4M)
  - 74th Armored Battalion "Saar/Storm" (Merkava Mk.4M)
  - 605th Combat Engineer Battalion "Ha-Mahatz"
  - 275th Logistics Battalion "Barak"
  - Reconnaissance Company
  - 358th Signals Company "Lightning Arrow"

== List of Carmeli Brigade operations in the 1948 Arab–Israeli war ==
- Operation Ben-Ami
- Operation Dekel (one battalion)
- Operation Hiram
- Operation Misparayim

== List of villages and town battles the Carmeli Brigade fought ==
- Al-Nahr
- Al-Ghabisiyya
- Al-Sumayriyya
- Al-Tall
- Al-Kabri
- Al-Mansura
- Haifa (the Arab quarters)
- Umm al-Faraj

== Memorial ==
The memorial is situated in the Golan Heights at Road 91 near the entrance to Nahal Gilbon and the former Syrian village Aleiqa. It is inscribed with a verse from a Hebrew song, citing Jeremiah 17:8: "A person is like a tree planted by water, seeking roots."
