= Achziv =

Ancient site on the Mediterranean coast of northern Israel

- Az-Zeeb (الزيب) al-Zib, al-Zaib
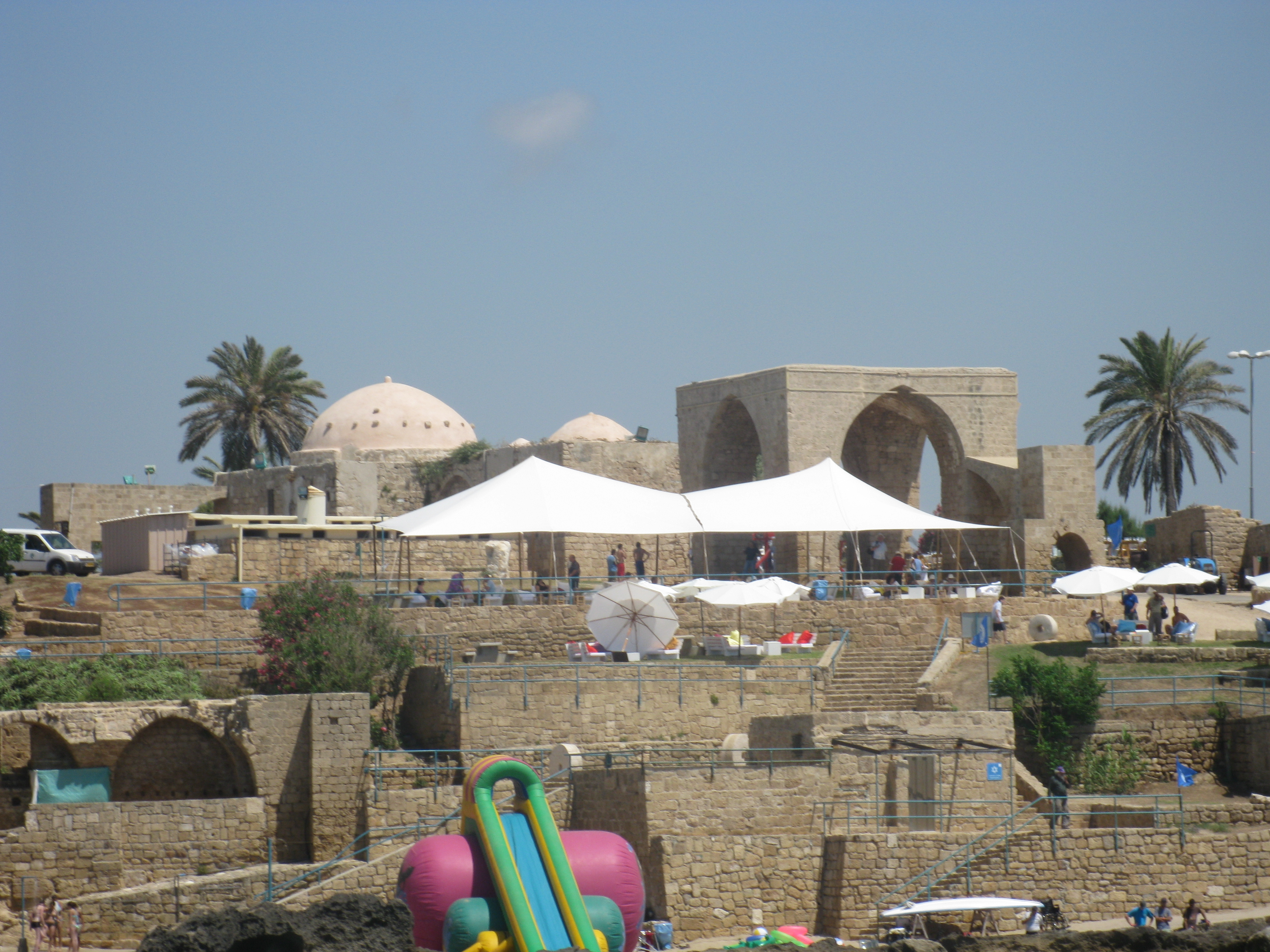
- Remaining structures of az-Zeeb (today a recreational area), including its mosque, 2009

- Location within Northwest Israel Location within Israel
- 33°02′52″N 35°06′08″E
- Cultures: Israeli, Coptic, Islamic
- Location: Israel
- Region: Northern District

History
- Event(s): Battle of Casal Imbert (1232), part of the War of the Lombards

Site notes
- Area: 12.4

Achziv (Hebrew: אַכְזִיב ʾAḵzīḇ) or Az-Zeeb (Arabic: الزيب, romanized: Az-Zīb) is an ancient site on the Mediterranean coast of northern Israel, between the border with Lebanon and the city of Acre. It is located 13.5 kilometres (8.4 mi) north of Acre on the coast of the Mediterranean Sea, within the municipal area of Nahariya. Today it is an Israeli national park.

Excavations have unearthed a fortified Canaanite city of the second millennium BCE. The Phoenician town of the first millennium BCE is known both from the Hebrew Bible and Assyrian sources. Phoenician Achzib went through ups and downs during the Persian and Hellenistic periods. In early Roman times the town, known as Acdippa, was a road station. The Bordeaux Pilgrim mentions it in 333–334 CE still as a road station; Jewish sources of the Byzantine period call it Kheziv and Gesiv. There is no information about settlement at the site for the early Muslim period. The Crusaders built a new village with a castle there. During the Mamluk and Ottoman periods a modest village occupied the old tell (archaeological mound).

In modern times the site was known as the Palestinian town of Az-Zeeb, with a population of almost 2,000. It was depopulated during the Haganah's Operation Ben-Ami, on May 14, 1948, the last day of the British Mandate for Palestine.

The sole permanent resident of Achziv since declaration of the State was Eli Avivi (1930–2018), an Israeli photographer and micronationalist who hosted visitors to the legally disputed micronation of "Akhzivland", a small stretch of beach where he lived since 1975 until his death.

== Etymology ==
Mentioned in the Bible by its ancient name Achzib, evidence of human settlement at the site dates back to the 18th century BCE. During the Roman period (and in classical literature) the imperial authorities called it Ecdippa, Ecdeppa, or Ecdippon. By the early Middle Ages, the Arab name for the village "Az-Zeeb", or "al-Zib" (Arabic: الزيب meaning 'trickster') was locally in common usage. Az-Zeeb is a shortened form of the site's original ancient Canaanite/Phoenician name, Achzib.

== History ==
Human settlement at the site dates to as early as the 18th century BCE; and by the 10th century BCE it was a walled town. A tell excavated between 1941–44 and 1959-1964 found evidence of settlement from the Middle Bronze Age II, through the Roman Empire and the Early Middle Ages. Achziv was the first fortified settlement found at the site by archaeologists.

=== Middle Bronze Age ===
==== Middle Bronze Age IIA ====
In the Middle Bronze IIA (MBIIA), remains are found at Phase N5 with features including child burials in storage jars below floors.

==== Middle Bronze Age IIA-B ====
At the transition from MBIIA to MBIIB, the settlement was subject to a violent destruction.

==== Middle Bronze Age IIB ====
In the Middle Bronze IIB (MBIIB), Phase N4 was part of a large Canaanite port city. The massive ramparts, some 4.5 metres (15 feet) high, protected the city proper and a large area of port facilities. To the north and south the city extended to the two nearby rivers, which the Canaanite engineers connected by a fosse, thus transforming Achzib into an island. A substantial destruction level from the beginning of the Late Bronze Age proves that even these fortifications were eventually not sufficient. A fierce conflagration ended Phase N4 and led to the transition to the MBIIC/LBI in Phase N3.

=== Iron Age ===
==== Iron II ====
By the 1000 BCE, Achziv was a prosperous and fortified Phoenician town. Conquered by the Assyrian empire in the 8th century BCE, however, it was subsequently ruled by the Persians during the rule of the Roman Empire.

Positioned on a passage between the plain of Acre and the city of Tyre, Achzib was an important road station. Between the 10th and 6th centuries BCE, it was a prosperous town, with public buildings and tombs with Phoenician inscriptions, attesting to the identity of its inhabitants at the time. Conquered by the Assyrians in 701 BCE and listed in Sennacherib's Annals as Ak-zi-bi, the continuation of Phoenician settlement through this period and during the decline endured during the Persian period, is evidenced in 5th and 4th century BCE Phoenician inscriptions that were found at the site.

Prior to the Assyrian invasion of Achziv under Sennacherib, in the late 8th-century BCE, Achziv and Akko belonged to the king of Sidon, and were considered Hittite territory.

==== Biblical tradition ====
Achzib is mentioned in the Book of Joshua (19:29) and Book of Judges (1:31) as a town assigned to the tribe of Asher in the Hebrew Bible, but the Asherites did not manage to conquer it from the Phoenicians:

And the fifth lot came out for the tribe of the children of Asher ... and the outgoings thereof are at the sea from the coast to Achzib. (Joshua 19:24–29)
Asher did not drive out the inhabitants of Acco, ... or of Achzib ... (Judges 1:31)

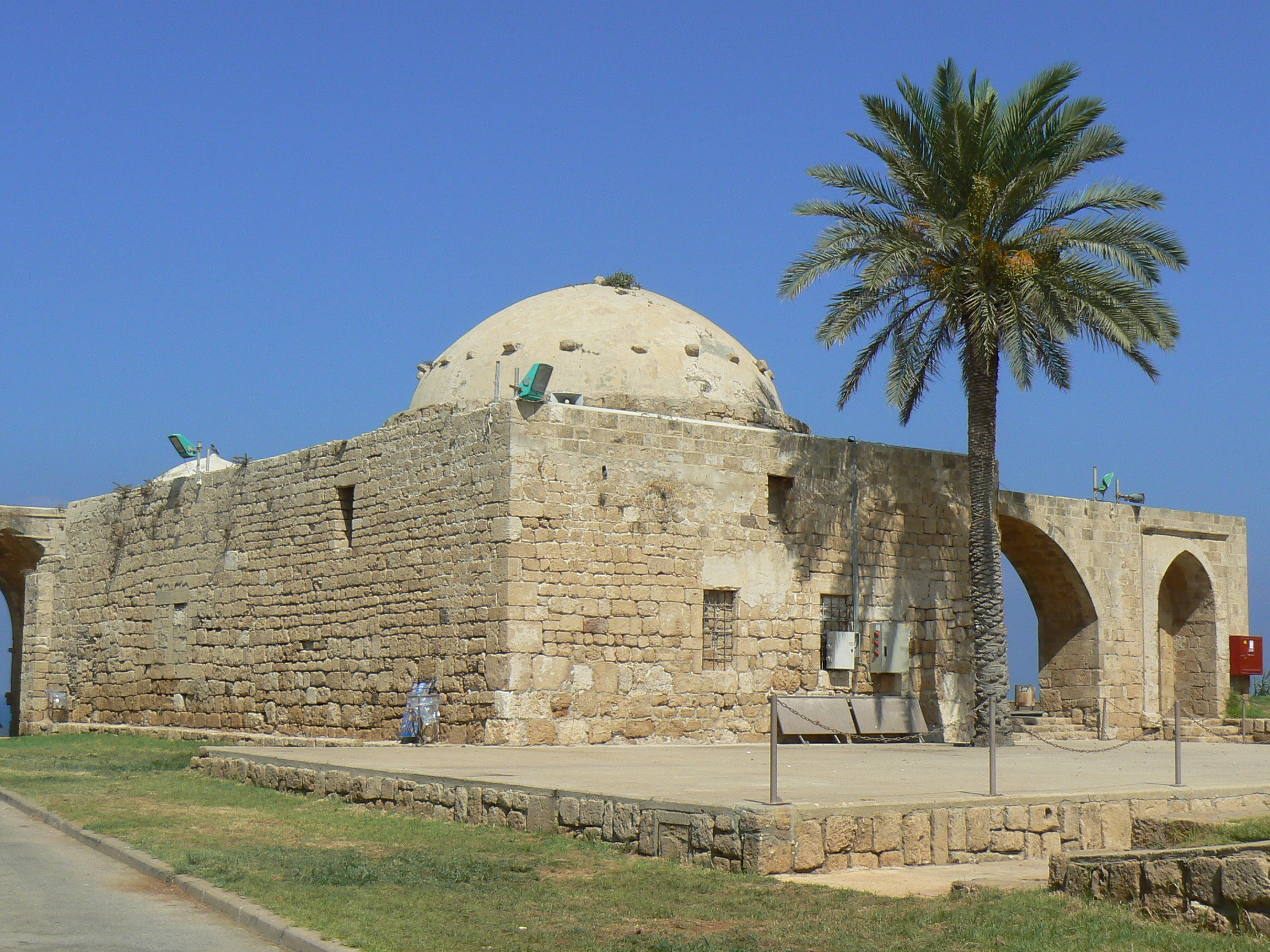
The mosque of al-Zib, restored at Achziv National Park

According to Biblical history, King David added the city into his Kingdom, but King Solomon returned it to Hiram I as part of the famous pact; archaeological evidence indicates that it remained Phoenician.

=== Classic era ===
Az-Zeeb الزيب l-Zib, al-Zaib, Achzib
- Etymology: "Trickster"
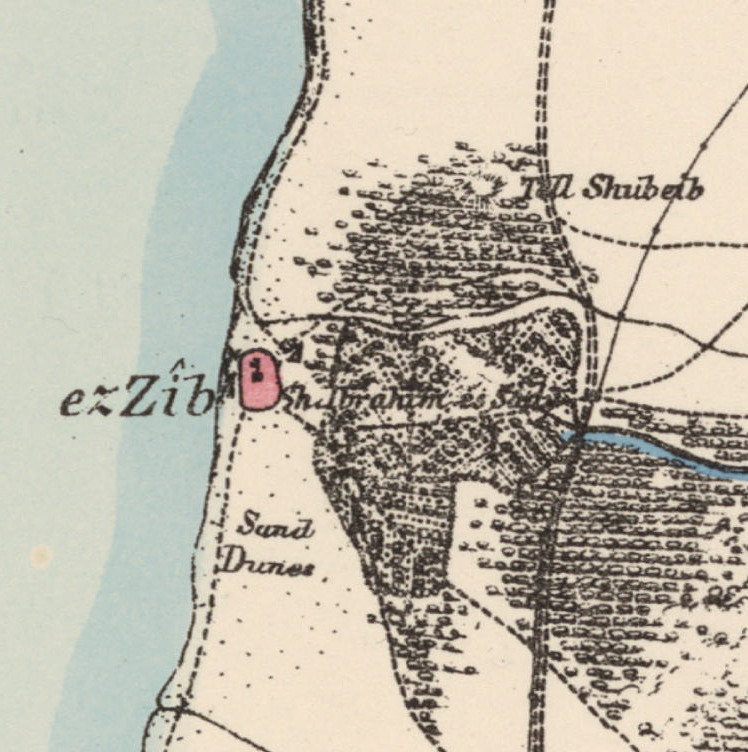
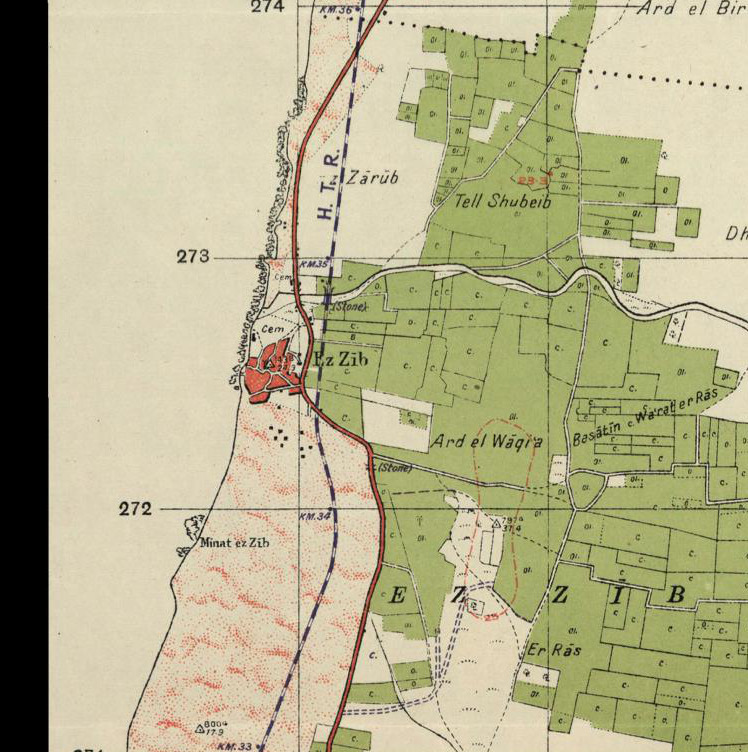
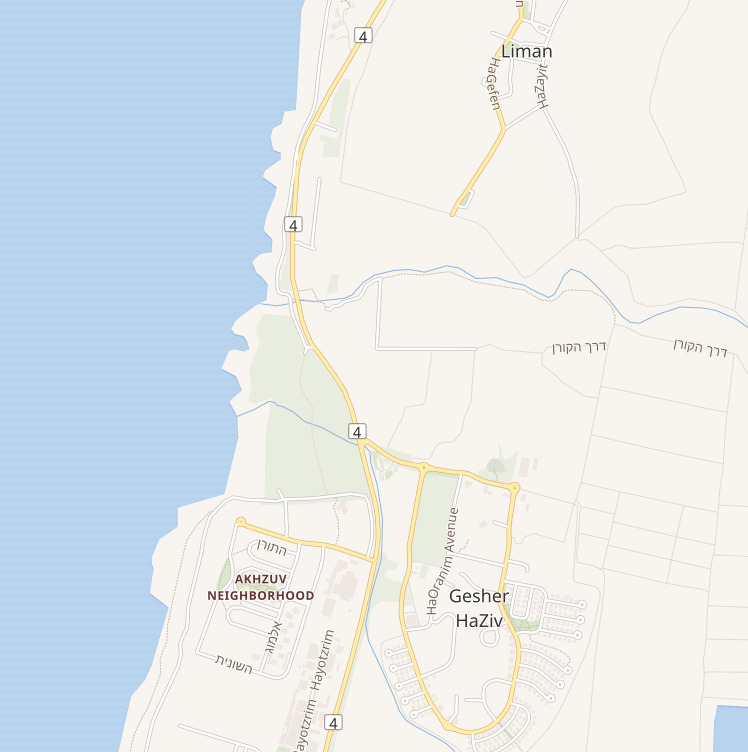
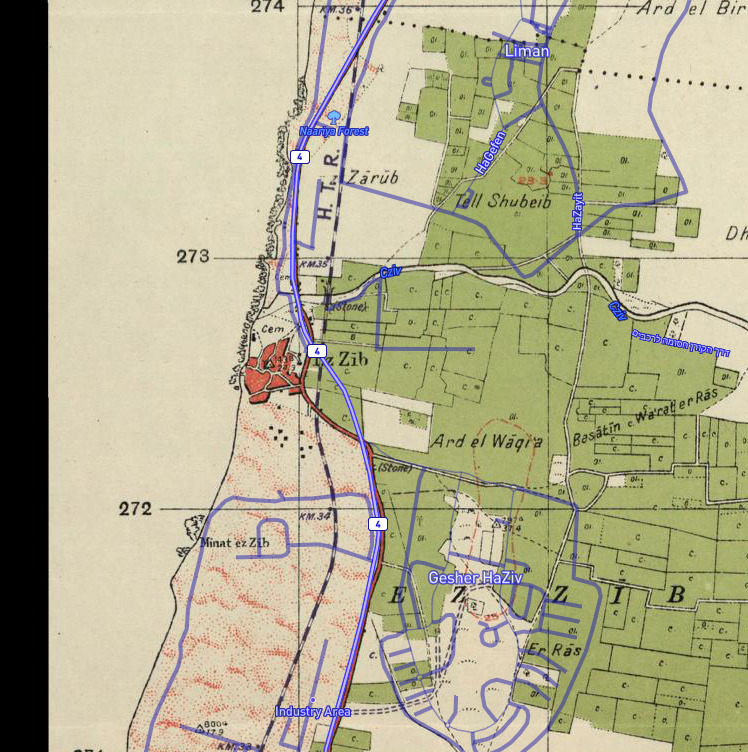
- 1870s map 1940s map modern map 1940s with modern overlay map A series of historical maps of the area around Achziv (click the buttons)

- Location within Mandatory Palestine
- Palestine grid: 160/272
- Geopolitical entity: Mandatory Palestine
- Subdistrict: Acre
- Date of depopulation: May 14, 1948

Area
  - Total: 12,607 dunams (12.607 km^{2}; 4.868 sq mi)

Population (1945)
  - Total: 1,910
- Cause(s) of depopulation: Military assault by Yishuv forces
- Current Localities: Gesher HaZiv, Sa'ar,

==== Hellenistic period ====
During the reign of the Seleucids the border was established at Rosh HaNikra, just north to Achziv, making it a border city which they called Ekdippa (Έκδιππα in Ancient Greek) and put it under the control of Acre. Mentioned in the writings of Pseudo-Scylax, the site likely regained some importance in Hellenistic times.

==== Roman and Byzantine periods ====
A maritime city named Cziv, nine miles (14 km) north of Acre, is mentioned by Josephus Flavius and later by Eusebius. Achziv (Cheziv) is mentioned in Jewish rabbinic writings, for example Midrash Vayikra Rabba 37:4. Additionally, Achziv is mentioned in the Babylonian Talmud, and by the relating Middle Age commentators, concerning the location of Achziv in regards to historical borders of Israel. At the end of the Roman era, a pottery workshop was located there.

=== Middle Ages ===
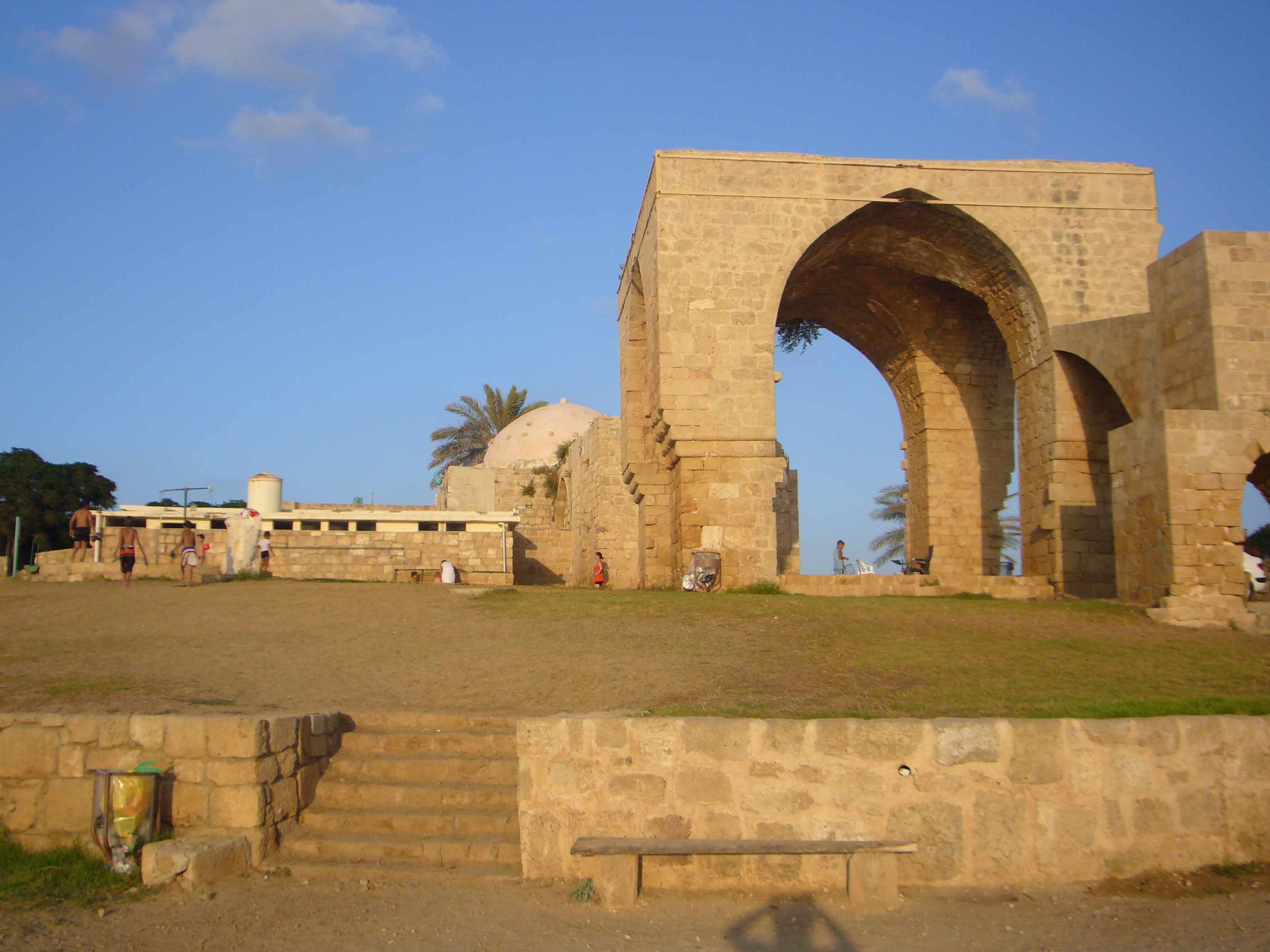
Remains of az-Zeeb

By the Early Middle Ages, Arab geographers were referring to the area as "az-Zeeb".

==== Crusader period ====
With the arrival of the Crusaders and after the fall of Acre in 1104, "Casal Imbertia" or "Lambertie" was established there. During the Crusader era, it expanded and became the main centre of a large estate with the same name, Casal Imbert. Lefiegre, Le Quiebre and La Gabassie were all part of this estate. The site was commonly known as "Casale Umberti," or Casal Humberti (after Hubert of Pacy who held the casale), and it is documented in 1108.

Az-Zeeb (meaning "trickster"), is first mentioned in Crusader sources in 1123 as a village belonging to Hubert of Pacy. In 1146, the Crusaders established a settlement there protected by a castle and named "Casale Huberti" and sometimes still as "Casal Humberti". Under Baldwin III, European farmers settled there sometime before 1153.

Arab geographer Ibn Jubayr toured Palestine in 1182 and mentioned az-Zeeb as a large fortress with a village and adjoining lands between Acre and Tyre. In 1198, King Aimery gave a large part of the income from Az-Zeeb to the Teutonic Order. In 1226, Arab geographer Yaqut al-Hamawi described az-Zeeb as a large village on the coast whose name was also pronounced "az-Zaib".

In 1232 it was the site of the Battle of Casal Imbert between German and French Crusaders as part of the War of the Lombards. In 1253 King Henry gave the whole estate of Casal Imbert to John of Ibelin. Shortly after, in 1256, John of Ibelin leased Az-Zeeb and all its dependant villages to the Teutonic Order for 10 years. In 1261, the whole estate was sold to the Teutonic Order, in return for an annual sum for as long as Acre was in Christian hands. In 1283 the village was mentioned as part of the domain of the Crusaders, according to the hudna (truce) between the Crusaders in Acre and the Mamluk sultan Qalawun.

==== Mamluk period ====
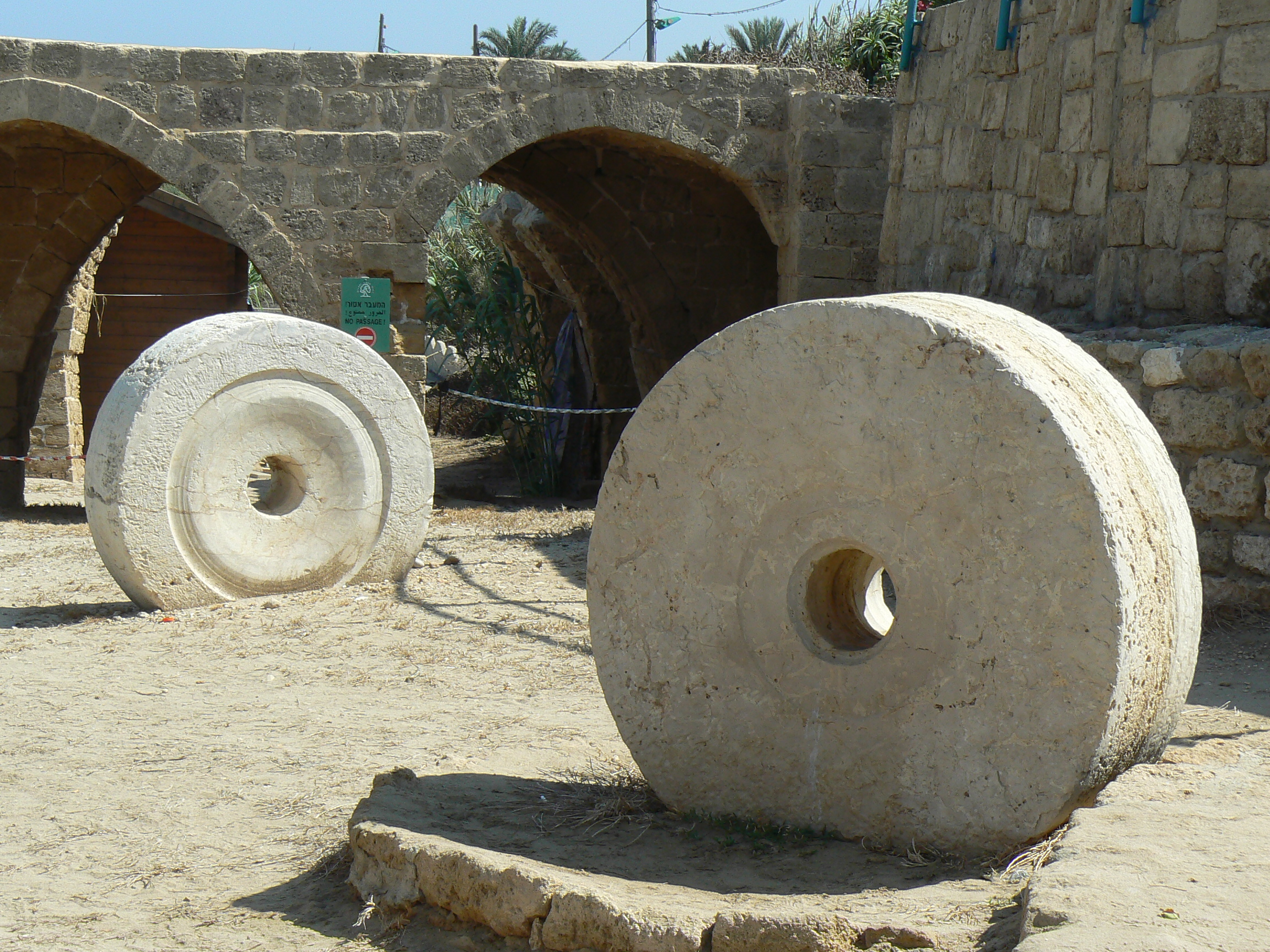
Ancient grinding stones at Achziv National Park

The Arab village of Az-Zeeb was established during the later Mamluk period with the houses erected using the stones of the destroyed Crusader castle; and thrived throughout the Ottoman rule. There are descriptions of the castle and village by Arab chroniclers in the 12th and 13th centuries, just prior to and during the rule of the Mamluks in the region.

=== Ottoman era ===
In the early 16th century, az-Zeeb was incorporated into the Ottoman Empire and its inhabitants cultivated various crops and raised livestock on which they paid taxes to the Ottoman authorities. According to the 1596 tax records, it was a village in the nahiya (subdistrict) of Akka, part of Sanjak Safad with a population of 132 households and 27 bachelors and an estimated total of 875 persons. All were Muslim. The villagers paid a fixed tax rate of 25% on several agricultural items including, wheat, barley, "summer crops", fruits, cotton, beehives, goats, and water buffalo; a total of 23,669 akçe. All of the revenue went to a waqf.

A map by Pierre Jacotin from Napoleon's invasion of 1799 showed the village, named as Zib. British traveler James Silk Buckingham describes az-Zeeb in 1816 as a small town built on a hill near the sea with few palm trees rising above its houses. During the period of Egyptian rule in Palestine, the sheikh (chief) of az-Zeeb, Said al-Sabi, joined the 1834 peasants' rebellion against governor Ibrahim Pasha. He was arrested and exiled to Egypt by the authorities in the summer of that year because of his participation.

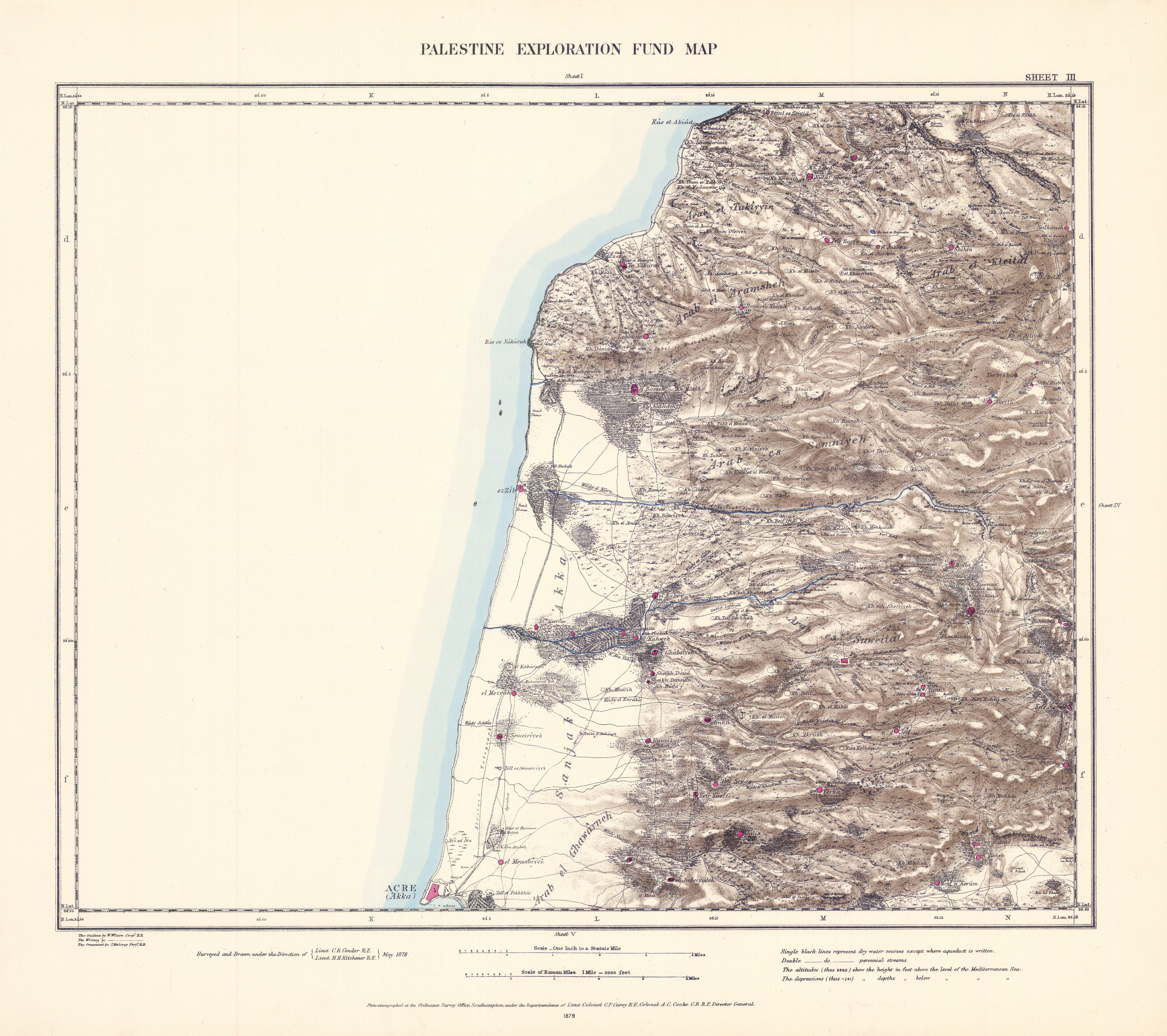
Survey map of western Palestine, c. 1880

In 1875, when Victor Guérin visited, Az-Zeeb had 500 Muslim inhabitants. Guérin noted that the hill on which it was built had formerly been surrounded by a wall, traces of which were still to be seen on the east side. By the late 19th century, most of the village houses were built of stone, a mosque and a clinic had been established, and the residents cultivated olives, figs, mulberries, and pomegranates. The population consisted of about 400 Muslims. In 1882, the Ottomans established an elementary school in az-Zeeb. A population list from about 1887 showed that Kh. ez Zib had about 730 inhabitants, all Muslim.

=== British Mandate period ===
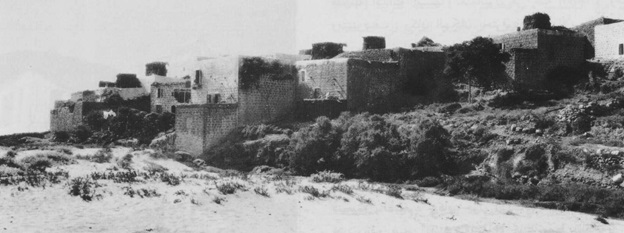
Az-Zeeb and its beach, 1928

Az-Zeeb became a part of the British Mandate of Palestine in 1922. In the 1922 census of Palestine, "Al Zib" had a population of 804; 803 Muslims and 1 Christian, where the one Christian was a Roman Catholic. The population had increased in the 1931 census to 1059, all Muslims, in a total of 251 houses.

The main economic sectors in the village were in fishing and agriculture, particularly fruit cultivation, which included bananas, citrus, olives, and figs. The town held four olive presses: two mechanized and two animal-drawn. Between 1927 and 1945, the village's annual fish catch was 16 metric tons. In the 1945 statistics, the population of Az Zeeb was 1,910, all Muslims, with a total land area of 12,607 dunams. Of this, 2,973 dunams were used for citrus and bananas; 1,989 dunums were irrigated or used for orchards; 4,425 were for cereals; while 62 dunams were built-up (urban) areas.

The population of the village in 1945 was 1,910.

==== Political unrest ====
In 1946, the Jewish Resistance Movement attempted to blow up the railroad bridge over the creek at Achziv in an operation known as Night of the Bridges. A monument to the 14 soldiers killed there was erected on the site.

=== 1948 War ===
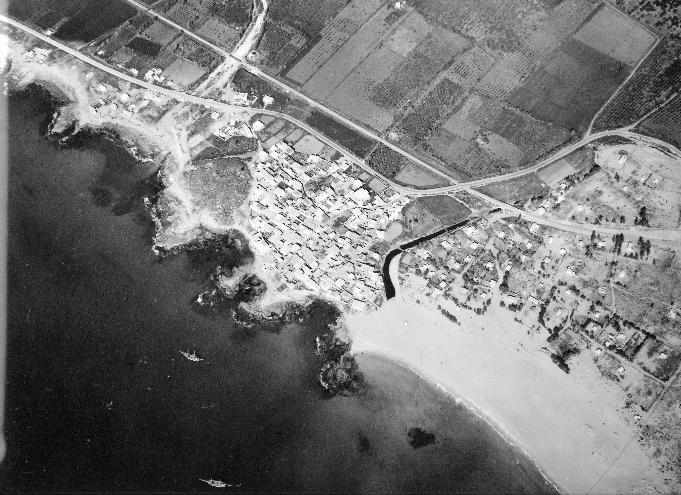
Az-Zeeb 1948

Just before the official end to Mandate rule on May 14, 1948, and the start of the 1948 Arab–Israeli War, az-Zeeb was captured by the Haganah's Carmeli Brigade, being one of the main places targeted in Operation Ben-Ami. According to Haganah accounts, the residents immediately "fled upon the appearance of Jewish forces, and the Haganah command decided to hold on to [it]." However, Israeli historian Benny Morris states that the Haganah had a "long account" with az-Zeeb because it was a center of Arab attacks on Jews and that most of the inhabitants fled after the village was hit with a mortar barrage by the Haganah. Morris writes that two Haganah companies reported in mid-May 1948 that they were "attacking al Zib with the aim of blowing up the village". Eyewitness accounts from among the villagers indicate that they mistook the incoming Israeli forces for Arab reinforcements because they had donned red and white keffiyehs, and that these forces quickly overwhelmed the local militia of 35–40 men. Many of the inhabitants fled to Lebanon or nearby villages, but many also remained in az-Zeeb until they were relocated by the Israeli authorities to the Arab coastal town of Mazra'a. Some villagers later claimed that the Haganah had "molested or violated" a number of women.

The Israeli localities of Sa'ar and Gesher HaZiv were established on the village lands in 1948 and 1949. A domed mosque from the village has since been restored and serves as a tourist site, and the house of the last mukhtar (village headman) is now a museum.

=== Israel ===
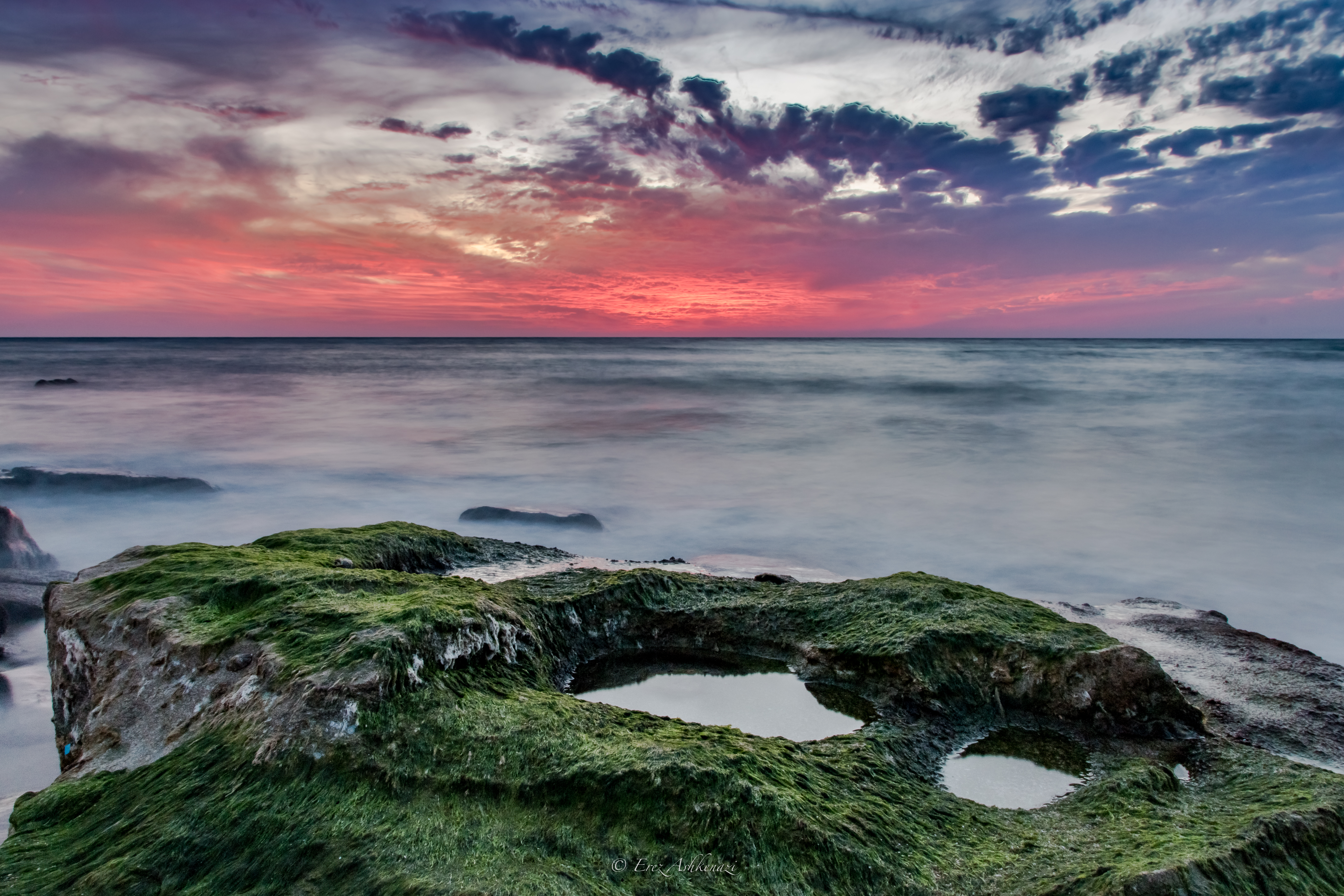
Achziv at sunset

Achziv is an Israeli national park. Today Achziv shores are part of the Achziv-Rosh haNikra marine protected area, which is located between the city of Naharia to the south and the Israeli-Lebanon border to the north. The marine protected area has 7 kilometers of shore line and continue into the sea for another 15 kilometers west. This marine nature reserve protects the fauna and flora of the stony reefs and the sandy beach environments. It is the only marine protected area in Israel in which the maximum depth is deeper than 850 meters. Near the national park is Akhzivland, founded by Eli Avivi in 1971 and currently used as a vacation village and camping site.

== Archaeology ==
Remnants of ancient Achziv, now known as Tel Achziv, are located on a sandstone mound between two streams, Kziv on the north and Shaal on the south, close to the border with Lebanon. An ancient port was located on the coast, and another secondary port is located 700 m to the south. Archeological excavations have revealed that a walled city existed at the location from the Middle Bronze period.

== See also ==
- National parks of Israel
- Depopulated Palestinian locations in Israel

== Bibliography ==
- Avshalom-Gorni, Dina (2006-08-03). "Akhziv". Hadashot Arkheologiyot – Excavations and Surveys in Israel (118).
- Barag, Dan (1979). "A new source concerning the ultimate borders of the Latin Kingdom of Jerusalem". Israel Exploration Journal. 29 (3/4): 197–217. JSTOR 27925726.
- Barron, J.B., ed. (1923). Palestine: Report and General Abstracts of the Census of 1922. Government of Palestine.
- Benveniśtî, M. (2000). Sacred landscape: the buried history of the Holy Land since 1948. University of California Press. ISBN 978-0-520-23422-2.
- Buckingham, J.S. (1821). Travels in Palestine through the countries of Bashan and Gilead, east of the River Jordan, including a visit to the cities of Geraza and Gamala in the Decapolis. London: Longman, Hurst, Rees, Orme and Brown.
- Conder, C.R.; Kitchener, H.H. (1881). The Survey of Western Palestine: Memoirs of the Topography, Orography, Hydrography, and Archaeology. Vol. 1. London: Committee of the Palestine Exploration Fund.
- Frankel, Rafael (1988). "Topographical notes on the territory of Acre in the Crusader period". Israel Exploration Journal. 38 (4): 249–272. JSTOR 27926125.
- Government of Palestine, Department of Statistics (1945). Village Statistics, April, 1945.
- Guérin, V. (1880). Description Géographique Historique et Archéologique de la Palestine (in French). Vol. 3: Galilee, pt. 2. Paris: L'Imprimerie Nationale.
- Hadawi, S. (1970). Village Statistics of 1945: A Classification of Land and Area ownership in Palestine. Palestine Liberation Organization Research Center. Archived from the original on 2018-12-08.
- Hütteroth, W.-D.; Abdulfattah, K. (1977). Historical Geography of Palestine, Transjordan and Southern Syria in the Late 16th Century. Erlanger Geographische Arbeiten, Sonderband 5. Erlangen, Germany: Vorstand der Fränkischen Geographischen Gesellschaft. ISBN 978-3-920405-41-4.
- Karmon, Y. (1960). "An Analysis of Jacotin's Map of Palestine" (PDF). Israel Exploration Journal. 10 (3): 155–173, 244–253. Archived from the original (PDF) on 2019-12-22.
- Khalidi, W. (1992). All That Remains: The Palestinian Villages Occupied and Depopulated by Israel in 1948. Washington D.C.: Institute for Palestine Studies. ISBN 978-0-88728-224-9.
- Le Strange, G. Palestine Under the Moslems: A Description of Syria and the Holy Land from A.D. 650 to 1500. Committee of the Palestine Exploration Fund. ISBN 978-0-404-56288-5.
- Lipiński, E. (2004). Itineraria Phoenicia: Studia Phoenicia 18. Peeters Publishers. ISBN 978-90-429-1344-8.
- Mills, E., ed. (1932). Census of Palestine 1931. Population of Villages, Towns and Administrative Areas. Jerusalem: Government of Palestine.
- Morris, B. (2004). The Birth of the Palestinian Refugee Problem Revisited. Cambridge University Press. ISBN 978-0-521-00967-6.
- Murray, Alan (2000). The Crusader Kingdom of Jerusalem: A Dynastic History 1099-1125. Linacre College, Oxford: Unit for Prosopographical Research. ISBN 9781900934039.
- Nazzal, Nafez (1978). The Palestinian Exodus from Galilee 1948. Beirut: The Institute for Palestine Studies. ISBN 9780887281280.
- Palmer, E.H. (1881). The Survey of Western Palestine: Arabic and English Name Lists Collected During the Survey by Lieutenants Conder and Kitchener, R. E. Transliterated and Explained by E.H. Palmer. Committee of the Palestine Exploration Fund.
- Petersen, Andrew (2001). A Gazetteer of Buildings in Muslim Palestine (British Academy Monographs in Archaeology). Vol. I. Oxford University Press. pp. 321–322. ISBN 978-0-19-727011-0.
- Pringle, D. (1997). Secular buildings in the Crusader Kingdom of Jerusalem: an archaeological Gazetter. Cambridge University Press. ISBN 0521-46010-7.
- Pringle, D. (1998). The Churches of the Crusader Kingdom of Jerusalem: L-Z (excluding Tyre). Vol. II. Cambridge University Press. ISBN 0-521-39037-0.
- Rhode, H. (1979). Administration and Population of the Sancak of Safed in the Sixteenth Century (PhD). Columbia University. Archived from the original on 2020-03-01.
- Rustum, A. (1938). The Royal Archives of Egypt and the Disturbances in Palestine, 1834. American University of Beirut Press.
- Röhricht, R. (1893). (RRH) Regesta regni Hierosolymitani (MXCVII-MCCXCI) (in Latin). Berlin: Libraria Academica Wageriana.
- Schumacher, G. (1888). "Population list of the Liwa of Akka". Quarterly Statement - Palestine Exploration Fund. 20: 169–191.
- Strehlke, E., ed. (1869). Tabulae Ordinis Theutonici ex tabularii regii Berolinensis codice potissimum. Berlin: Weidmanns.
- Wilson, C.W., ed. (c. 1881). Picturesque Palestine, Sinai and Egypt. Vol. 3. New York: D. Appleton. (p.70)
