= Al-Kabri =

al-Kabri الكابري Kabira Le Quiebre (Crusader name)
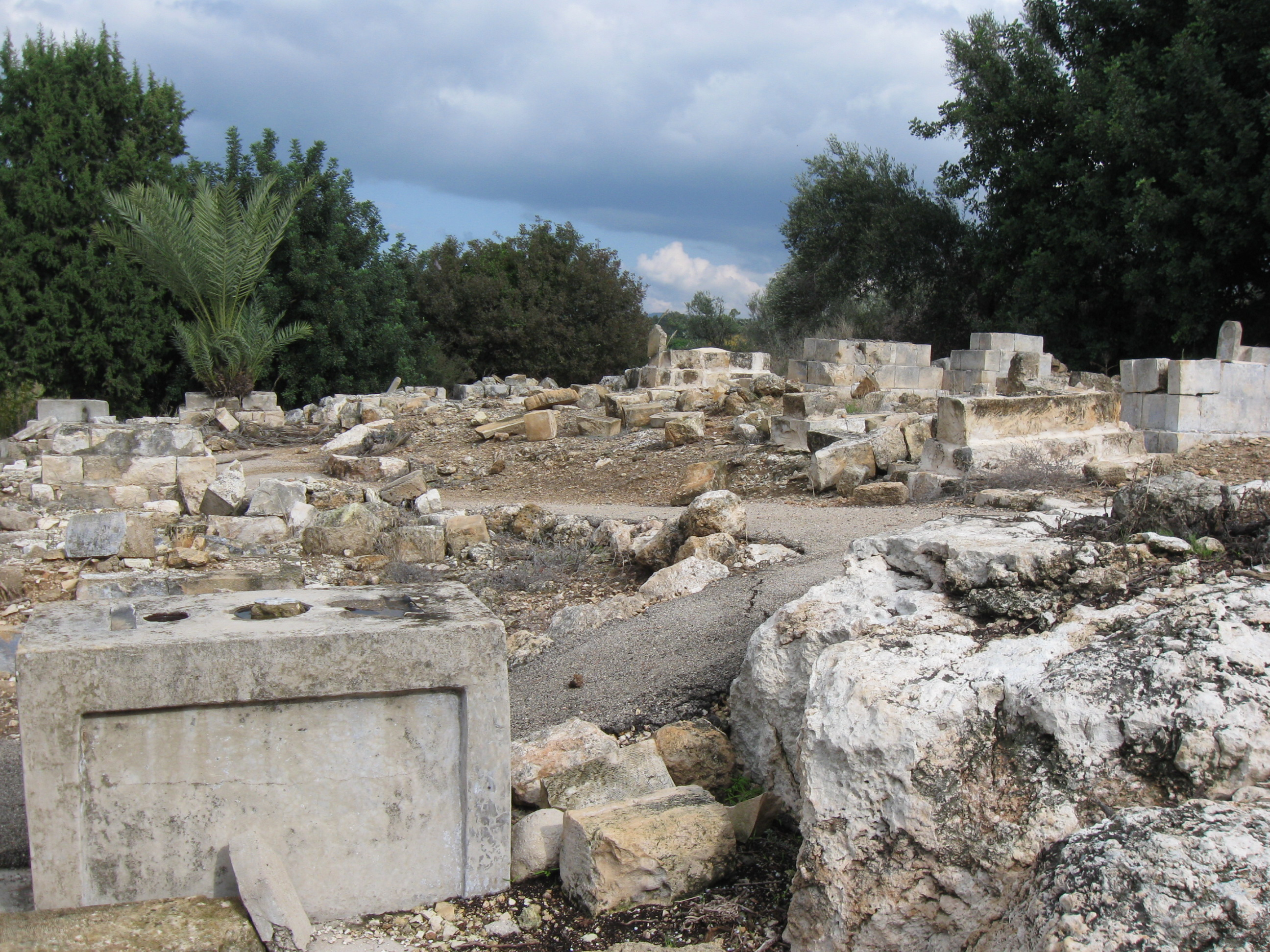
- the cemetery of Al-Kabri
- Etymology: The Bridge (in Turkish)
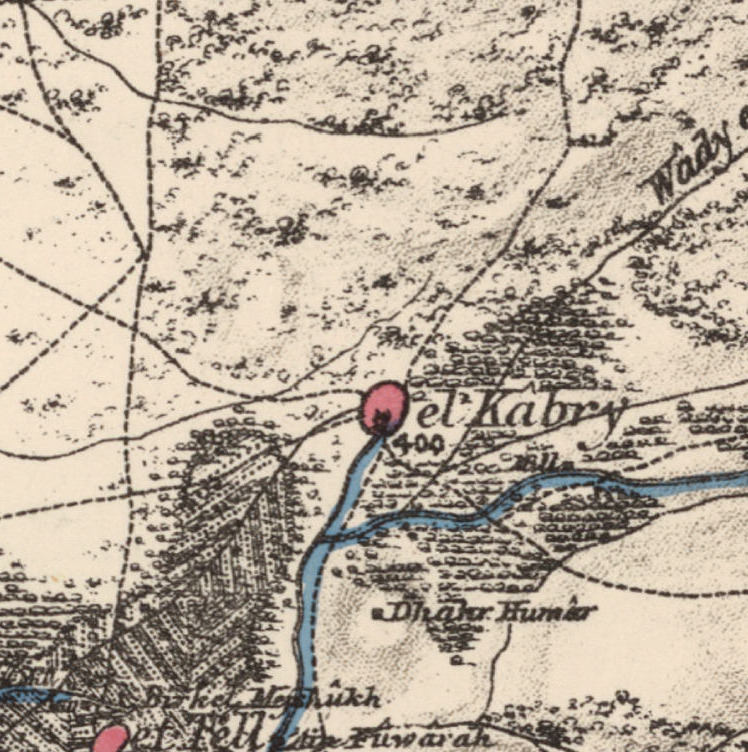
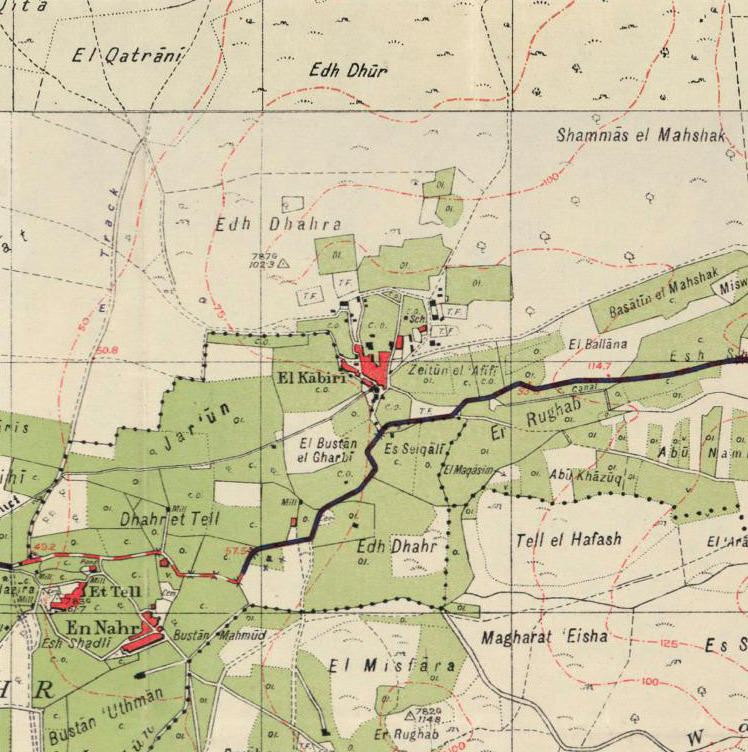
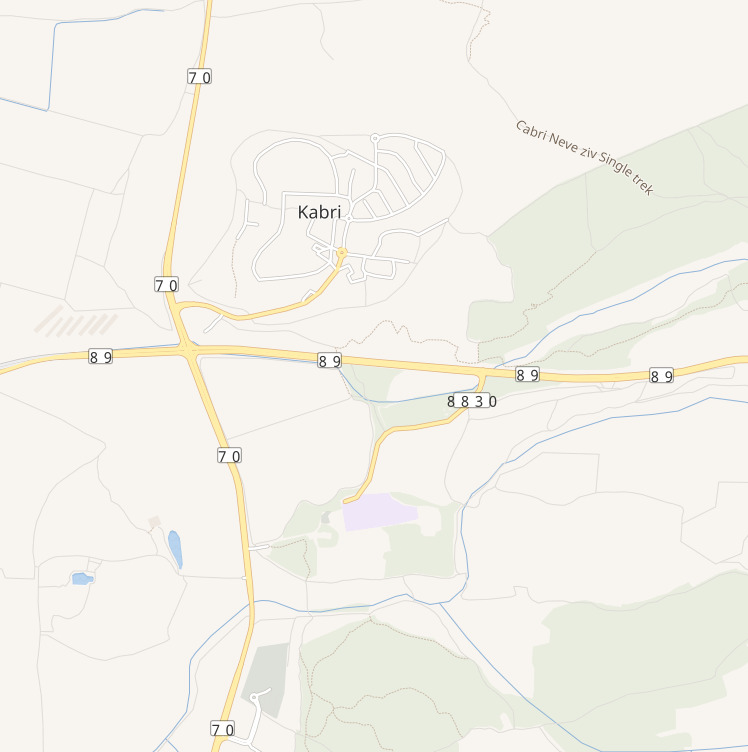
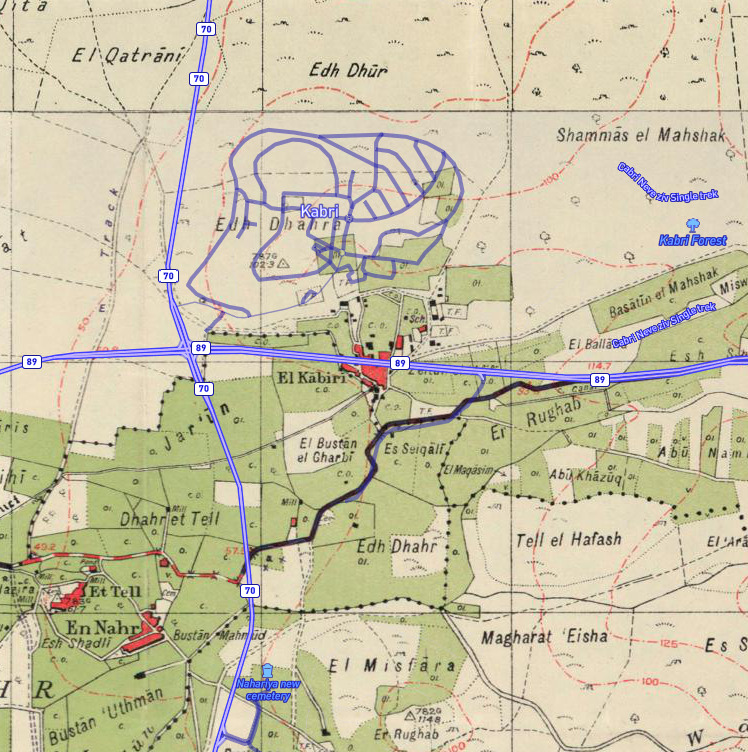
- 1870s map 1940s map modern map 1940s with modern overlay map A series of historical maps of the area around Al-Kabri (click the buttons)

- Location within Mandatory Palestine
- Coordinates: 33°00′56″N 35°09′03″E
- Palestine grid: 164/269
- Geopolitical entity: Mandatory Palestine
- Subdistrict: Acre
- Date of depopulation: 5, 21 May 1948

Area
  - Total: 28.7 km^{2} (11.1 sq mi)

Population (1945)
  - Total: 1,530
- Cause(s) of depopulation: Fear of being caught up in the fighting
- Secondary cause: Military assault by Yishuv forces
- Current Localities: Kabri, Ga'aton, Me'ona, Ein Ya'akov, Ma'alot, Kefar Vradim

Al-Kabri (Arabic: الكابري) was a Palestinian Arab town in the Galilee located 12.5 kilometers (7.8 mi) northeast of Acre. It was captured by the Haganah 21 May 1948, a week after the State of Israel was declared. In 1945, it had a population of 1,530 and a total area cultivated of 20,617 dunams. It is near the site of Tel Kabri.

== History ==
=== Crusader era ===
In the 13th century, al-Kabri was known as "Le Quiebre" and belonged to the fief of Casal Imbert (az-Zeeb). In 1253, King Henry granted the whole estate of Casal Imbert, including Le Quiebre, to John of Ibelin. Shortly after, in 1256, John of Ibelin leased az-Zeeb and all its dependent villages, including Le Quiebre, to the Teutonic Order for ten years. In 1261, az-Zeeb, together with Le Fierge and Le Quiebre, were sold to the Teutonic Order, in return for an annual sum for as long as Acre was in Crusader hands. In 1283, it was still a part of the Crusader states, as it was mentioned under the name "al-Kabrah", as part of their domain in the hudna (truce agreement) between the Crusaders based in Acre and the Mamluk sultan al-Mansur Qalawun.

=== Mamluk period ===
According to al-Maqrizi, it was under Mamluk rule by 1291, as it was mentioned under the name of "al-Kabira" in that year when Sultan al-Ashraf Khalil allocated the town's income to a charitable organization in Cairo.

=== Ottoman era ===
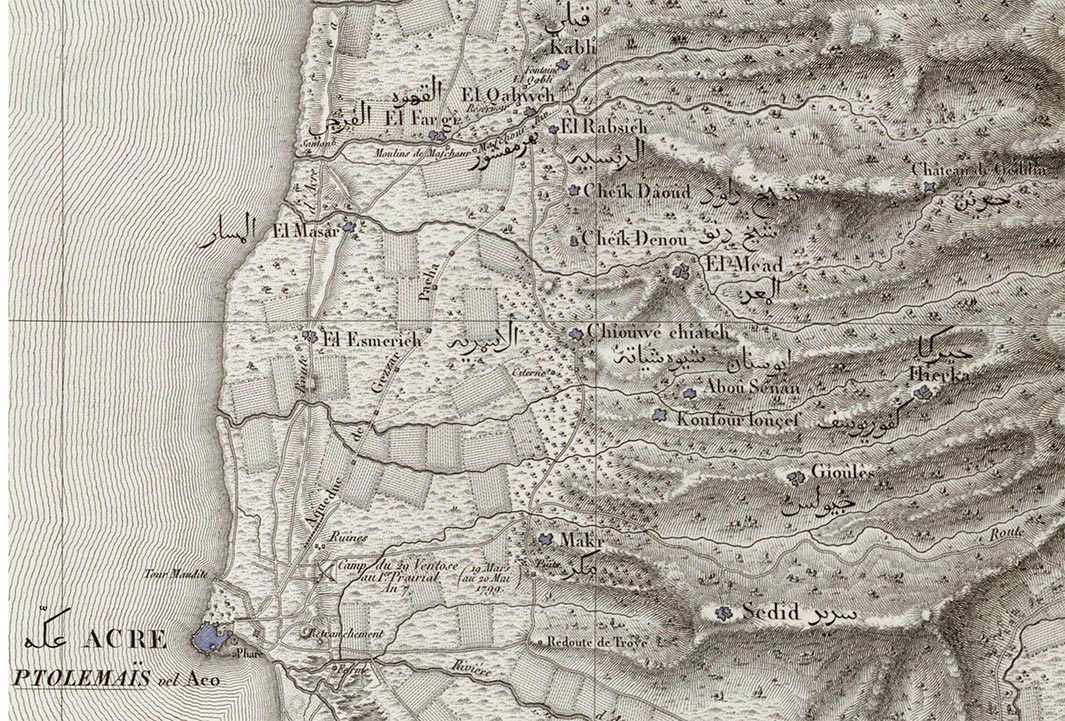
French map of the area in 1799. Note the aqueduct between Acre and Kabri, built by Jezzar Pasha.

Al-Kabri was incorporated into the Ottoman Empire in 1517, and by the 1596 tax records it was part of nahiya (subdistrict) of Akka, part of Safad Sanjak with an all-Muslim population of ten households. The villagers paid a fixed tax rate of 25% on various agricultural products, including wheat, barley, summer crops, cotton, beehives and/or goats and occasional revenues; a total of 1,691 akçe. 7/12 of the revenue went to a Waqf.

In Pierre Jacotin's map from 1799 the village was called Kabli. The place was well known for its springs, including Ayn Mafshuh, Ayn Fawwar, Ayn al-'Asal, and Ayn Kabri. The number of springs made al-Kabri the main supplier of water in the District of Acre. Ancient aqueducts supplied water from the springs to Acre, and two additional canals were built by Ahmad Pasha al-Jazzar in 1800, and Sulayman Pasha al-Adil in 1814.

In 1875, the French explorer Victor Guérin visited the village:

Many of the houses are built of good materials, which seem ancient. They are constructed of stones finely cut, mixed with simple rubble, perfectly jointed by means of little stones so placed as to fill up spaces and to make the whole compact. The site of an ancient church, now completely destroyed, is still, to a certain extent, to be traced. Many columns have been removed from it, and numbers of cut stones of medium size. Above the village, the ruins of houses prove that the place was once much more populous than now.

At twenty-five minutes walk from El Kabry is a spring called Neba Fawara. Formerly received in a basin, of which the foundations only are now visible, it runs away in a considerable stream, which waters several gardens. Enormous fig-trees show the extraordinary fruitfulness of the soil. A little farther I pass along arcades entirely covered with high bushes, which form part of the aqueduct of El Kabry. The ground rises here, so that the canal supported by these arcades is at the level of the ground, then it disappears altogether, reappearing again, according to the level of the ground. El Kabry is in a very advantageous position, thanks to its precious springs, which must always have caused the foundation of a group, more or less considerable, of houses. The name of Kabry shows that it was once called Gobara, a name given by Josephus to a place in another part of Galilee. It contains two abundant springs; one is received in a reservoir similar to that of Et Tell, and from there, by an opening made expressly, the water runs off in a cascade to turn mills and water gardens. The second spring gushes from the bottom of a kind of vaulted cave, into which one descends by steps, and it feeds the aqueduct, which, sometimes subterranean, sometimes on the level of the ground, sometimes borne in arcades, supplies Akka with water. Reconstructed by Jezzar Pasha at the end of the last century, this aqueduct has succeeded one much older, of which traces yet remain.

Besides these two springs there is a third not far off, called Ain Jatun, of equal importance, which fertilises the proverbially fruitful territory of Kabry.

In 1881 the PEF's Survey of Western Palestine described the village as a "village built of stone, containing about 400 Moslems, situated on the edge of the plain, with gardens and olives, figs and mulberries, apples and pomegranates; there is a large spring and birket here, at which the aqueduct conveying water to 'Akka commences."

A population list from about 1887 showed el Kabry to have about 690 inhabitants, all Muslims.

=== British Mandate period ===
In the 1922 census of Palestine conducted by the British Mandate authorities, al-Kabri had a population of 553 inhabitants, all Muslims, increasing in the 1931 census to 728 Muslims in 173 houses. During this period, al-Kabri's houses were built of stone, mud, and reinforced concrete. The village contained a mosque and a boys' elementary school. Agriculture was the base of the economy with villagers cultivating olives, citrus, and bananas and engaged in animal husbandry, including raising cattle.

The population grew to 1,530 in the 1945 statistics, still all Muslim. Together with the nearby Tarshiha, the villages had 47,428 dunums of land at this time. Of this, a total of 743 dunums of land in the two villages was used for citrus and bananas, 5,301 were plantation and irrigable land, 14,123 for cereals, while 252 dunams were built-up (urban) land.

=== 1948 war and destruction ===
During the 1948 Palestine war, Al-Kabri was first badly shaken by the Palmach raid on the village on the night 31 January/1 February 1948, in which the house of the main al-Husayni-affiliated notable, Fares Efendi Sirhan, was partly demolished by a huge explosion. After this, Sirhan and his family fled to Lebanon.

On 27 March 1948, the Yehiam convoy bringing supplies to besieged Kibbutz Yehiam was ambushed while passing by al-Kabri and 46 Haganah members were killed.

In April 1948, the Haganah prepared an initial blueprint for an operation called "Ehud", which provided for attacks on al-Kabri, al Nahar, al-Bassa and al-Zib for "the destruction of the gangs [and] the menfolk, [and] the destruction of property". Yaacov Pundaq, a Haganah commander in the Carmeli Brigade's 21st Battalion, who was responsible for the area around Nahariya designated to be part of the future Arab state in the 1947 United Nations Partition Plan, had repeatedly caused damage to the Kabri aqueduct nearby, the primary conduit for feeding Acre. In the face of successful repair work by Arabs, he contaminated the site's waters with flasks of typhoid, or typhoid and diphtheria bacteria. This was the most serious use of Israel's deployment of biological warfare in 1948.

The village was likely occupied on the night of 20–21 May during the second stage of Operation Ben-Ami, by which time most of the inhabitants had fled. During their dispersal in Galilee some of the villagers were killed when it was discovered that they came from al-Kabri, in retaliation for the convoy ambush.

According to Palestinian historian Walid Khalidi, the remaining structures in al-Kabri's lands in 1992 were "crumbled walls and stone rubble, overgrown with thorns, weeds, and bushes."

A Jewish community by the same name, Kabri, was built on land adjacent to the site of the Palestinian village, which is also for agriculture and pasture land.

== Geography ==
Al-Kabri was at the eastern end of the Western Galilee coastal plain. It was less than 5 kilometres (3.1 mi) from the sea, with the Ga'aton River nearby to the south. The closest modern city is Nahariyya to the west. The villages lands were home to four springs: Ayn Mafshuh, Ayn Fawwar, Ayn al-'Asal, and Ayn Kabri. It is these springs that have brought people to the site since the Neolithic.

== Bibliography ==
- Abu-'Uqsa, Hanaa (6 June 2007). "El-Kabri Final Report". Hadashot Arkheologiyot – Excavations and Surveys in Israel (119).
- Al-Maqrizi (1845). Histoire des sultans mamlouks, de l'Égypte, écrite en arabe (in French and Latin). Vol. 2. Translator: Étienne Marc Quatremère. Paris: Oriental Translation Fund of Great Britain and Ireland.
- Barag, Dan (1979). "A new source concerning the ultimate borders of the Latin Kingdom of Jerusalem". Israel Exploration Journal. 29 (3/4): 197–217. JSTOR 27925726.
- Barron, J.B., ed. (1923). Palestine: Report and General Abstracts of the Census of 1922. Government of Palestine.
- Benveniśtî, M. (2000). Sacred landscape: the buried history of the Holy Land since 1948. University of California Press. ISBN 978-0-520-23422-2.
- Clermont-Ganneau, C.S. (1898). Recueil d'archéologie orientale (in French). Vol. 2. Paris. (p. 56)
- Conder, C.R.; Kitchener, H.H. (1881). The Survey of Western Palestine: Memoirs of the Topography, Orography, Hydrography, and Archaeology. Vol. 1. London: Committee of the Palestine Exploration Fund. (possibly Kabartha p. 154 )
- Dauphin, C. (1998). La Palestine byzantine, Peuplement et Populations. BAR International Series 726 (in French). Vol. III : Catalogue. Oxford: Archeopress. ISBN 978-0-860549-05-5. ( p. 634)
- Department of Statistics (1945). Village Statistics, April, 1945. Government of Palestine.
- Frankel, Rafael (1988). "Topographical notes on the territory of Acre in the Crusader period". Israel Exploration Journal. 38 (4): 249–272. JSTOR 27926125.
- Guérin, V. (1880). Description Géographique Historique et Archéologique de la Palestine (in French). Vol. 3: Galilee, pt. 2. Paris: L'Imprimerie Nationale.
- Hadawi, S. (1970). Village Statistics of 1945: A Classification of Land and Area ownership in Palestine. Palestine Liberation Organization Research Center. Archived from the original on 8 December 2018.
- Hütteroth, W.-D.; Abdulfattah, K. (1977). Historical Geography of Palestine, Transjordan and Southern Syria in the Late 16th Century. Erlanger Geographische Arbeiten, Sonderband 5. Erlangen, Germany: Vorstand der Fränkischen Geographischen Gesellschaft. ISBN 978-3-920405-41-4.
- Karmon, Y. (1960). "An Analysis of Jacotin's Map of Palestine" (PDF). Israel Exploration Journal. 10 (3, 4): 155–173, 244–253. Archived from the original (PDF) on 22 December 2019.
- Khalidi, W. (1992). All That Remains: The Palestinian Villages Occupied and Depopulated by Israel in 1948. Washington D.C.: Institute for Palestine Studies. ISBN 978-0-88728-224-9.
- Mills, E., ed. (1932). Census of Palestine 1931. Population of Villages, Towns and Administrative Areas. Jerusalem: Government of Palestine.
- Morris, B. (2004). The Birth of the Palestinian Refugee Problem Revisited. Cambridge University Press. ISBN 978-0-521-00967-6.
- Nazzal, Nafez (1974): The Zionist occupation of western Galilee, 1948, Journal of Palestine Studies, Vol. 3, No. 3, 58–76.
- Nazzal, Nafez (1978). The Palestinian Exodus from Galilee 1948. Beirut: The Institute for Palestine Studies. ISBN 9780887281280.
- Palmer, E.H. (1881). The Survey of Western Palestine: Arabic and English Name Lists Collected During the Survey by Lieutenants Conder and Kitchener, R. E. Transliterated and Explained by E.H. Palmer. Committee of the Palestine Exploration Fund.
- Petersen, Andrew (2001). A Gazetteer of Buildings in Muslim Palestine (British Academy Monographs in Archaeology). Vol. 1. Oxford University Press. pp. 192−193. ISBN 978-0-19-727011-0. Archived from the original on 28 May 2021.
- Porat, Leea (11 June 2006). "Akko, the aqueduct". Hadashot Arkheologiyot – Excavations and Surveys in Israel (118).
- Rhode, H. (1979). Administration and Population of the Sancak of Safed in the Sixteenth Century. Columbia University. Archived from the original on 1 March 2020.
- Röhricht, R. (1893). (RRH) Regesta regni Hierosolymitani (MXCVII-MCCXCI) (in Latin). Berlin: Libraria Academica Wageriana.
- Schumacher, G. (1888). "Population list of the Liwa of Akka". Quarterly Statement - Palestine Exploration Fund. 20: 169–191.
- Smithline, Howard (4 May 2004). "El-Kabri". Hadashot Arkheologiyot – Excavations and Surveys in Israel (116).
- Smithline, Howard (14 February 2007). "Tel Kabri Final Report". Hadashot Arkheologiyot – Excavations and Surveys in Israel (119).
- Strehlke, E., ed. (1869). Tabulae Ordinis Theutonici ex tabularii regii Berolinensis codice potissimum. Berlin: Weidmanns.
- Tsuk, T. (2002). "Chapter 3: The Springs of Kabri". In A., Kempinski (ed.). Tel Kabri: The 1986–1993 Excavations Seasons. Emery and Claire Yass Publications in Archaeology. pp. 15–18. ISBN 978-965-266-015-2.
