= Operation Ben-Ami =

Haganah operation during the 1947–48 civil war in British Palestine

Operation Ben-Ami (Hebrew: מבצע בן עמי) was one of the last operations launched by the Haganah before the end of the British Mandate. The first phase of this operation was the capture of Acre. A week later four villages east and north of Acre were captured. The Carmeli Brigade of the Haganah allegedly used biological warfare in the battle for Acre in May 1948.

== Background ==
After the fall of Jaffa and Haifa the only remaining Arab towns with access to the Mediterranean Sea were Gaza and Acre. The population of Acre was swollen with refugees from Haifa which had been captured three weeks earlier. There was an outbreak of typhoid in Acre in the first week of May. British, Arab, and Red Cross documents describe that Haganah forces introduced poison into wells in Acre, leading to severe illness among dozens of local residents. The contamination of these wells triggered a typhoid epidemic and "a state of extreme distress" among the inhabitants, as noted by the mayor of Acre on 3 May.

== The operation ==
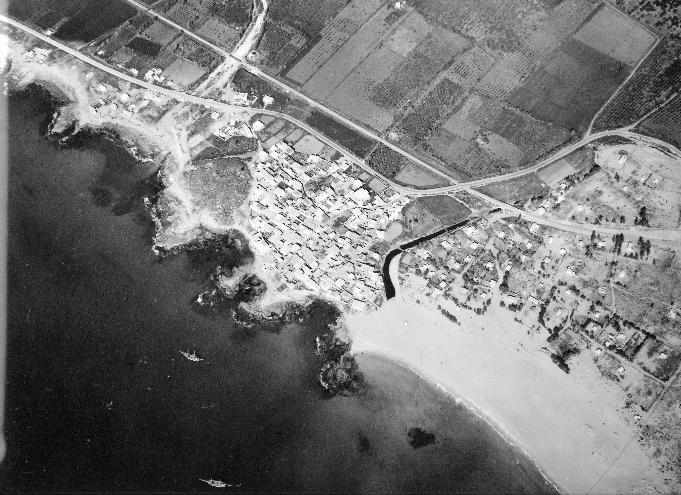
Al Zib, 1948, photograph from Palmach archive

The operation was carried out by the Carmeli Brigade, commanded by Moshe Carmel landed by Shayetet 11. It took place in territory allocated to the Arab State in the 1947 United Nations Partition Plan for Palestine, which was rejected by the Arab leaders and governments who indicated an unwillingness to accept any form of territorial division. The plan was accepted by the Yishuv, except for its fringes. The operation was launched on 13 May 1948 with the capture of villages east of Acre cutting the town off from the interior. On the night of 16/17 May, a mortar barrage was unleashed on the town and the following night it surrendered. The second phase was launched on 20 May. Carmel's operational order of 19 May read: "To attack in order to conquer, to kill among the men, to destroy and burn the villages..." One of the villages captured, al-Kabri, was singled out for particularly harsh treatment because of the villagers' involvement in the destruction of a convoy two months earlier. The Carmeli Brigade was involved in one further operation in the area on 11 June when they captured the village of al-Birwa. Ten days later a group of around 200 villagers re-took the village and remained there for two days until, on advice from the Arab Liberation Army, they withdrew and the village was retaken by newly established Israeli Army.

== Aftermath ==
About 5,000-6,000 Palestinians remained in Acre after its conquest—more than were left in Haifa or Jaffa. The inhabitants who remained in the villages, mostly old people, were gathered together at Mazra'a. Most of the populations either fled to Lebanon or inland to Nazareth. Most buildings in the villages were systematically blown up.

== Arab communities captured during Operation Ben-Ami ==
Name	Date	Defending forces	Brigade	Population
al-Zib	13 May 1948	militia (35-40 men)	Carmeli Brigade	1,910
al-Bassa	14 May 1948	militia	Haganah landed from sea	2,950
al-Manshiyya	14 May 1948	militia	Carmeli Brigade	810
al-Sumayriyya	14 May 1948	militia (35 men)	Carmeli Brigade by sea	760
al-Tall	20 May 1948	n/a	n/a	300
Umm al-Faraj	20 May 1948	n/a	Carmeli Brigade	800
al-Kabri	20 May 1948	n/a	Carmeli Brigade	5,360
al-Ghabisiyya	20 May 1948	militia (20 men)	Carmeli Brigade	1,240
al-Birwa	11 June 1948	villagers	Carmeli Brigade	1,460

== See also ==
- Depopulated Palestinian locations in Israel
- 1947–48 Civil War in Mandatory Palestine

== Bibliography ==
- Walid Khalidi, All That Remains, ISBN 0-88728-224-5.
- Benny Morris, The Birth of the Palestinian refugee problem, 1947–1949, ISBN 0-521-33028-9.
