= Umm al-Faraj =

Umm al-Faraj أُم الفرج Um el-Faraj, La Fierge
- Former village
- Etymology: The ruin with the gap, or chink
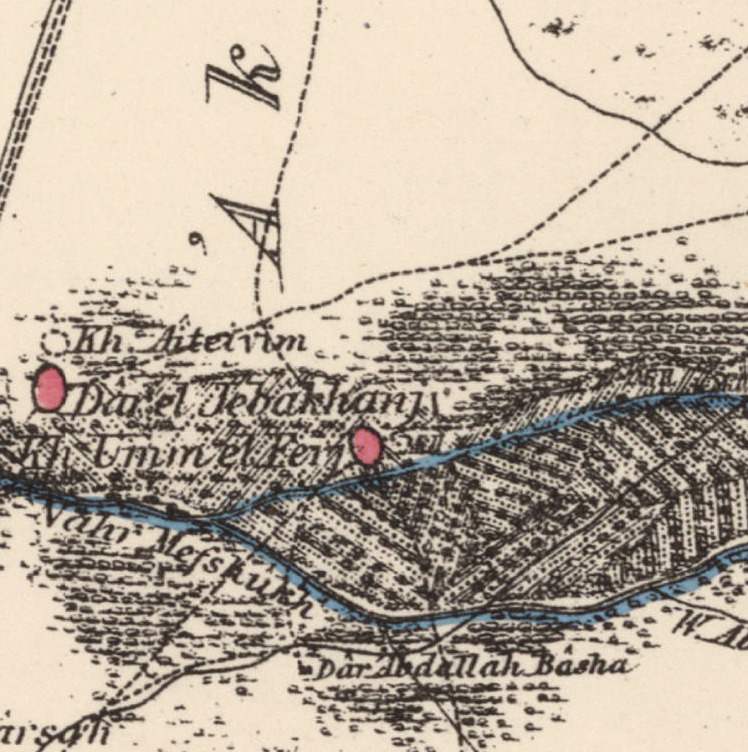
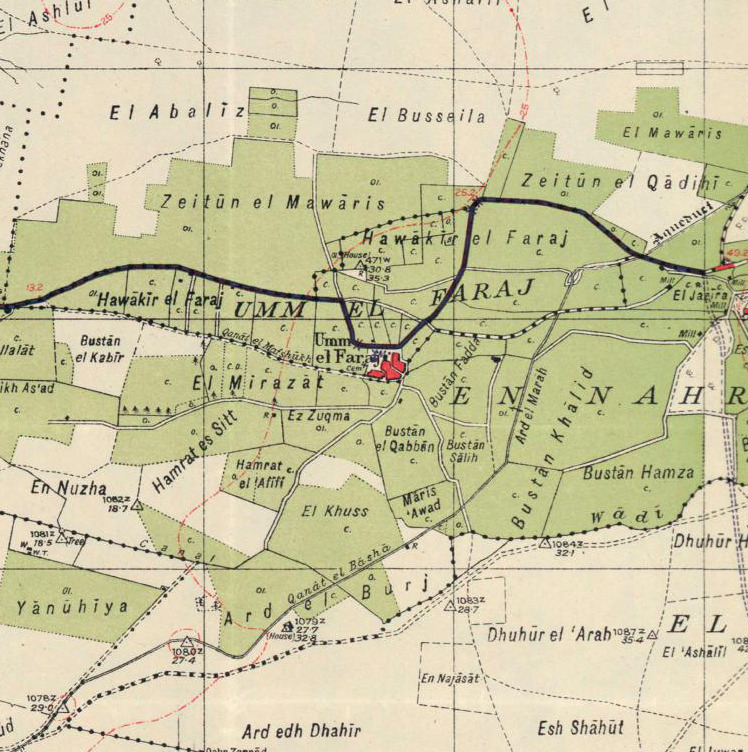
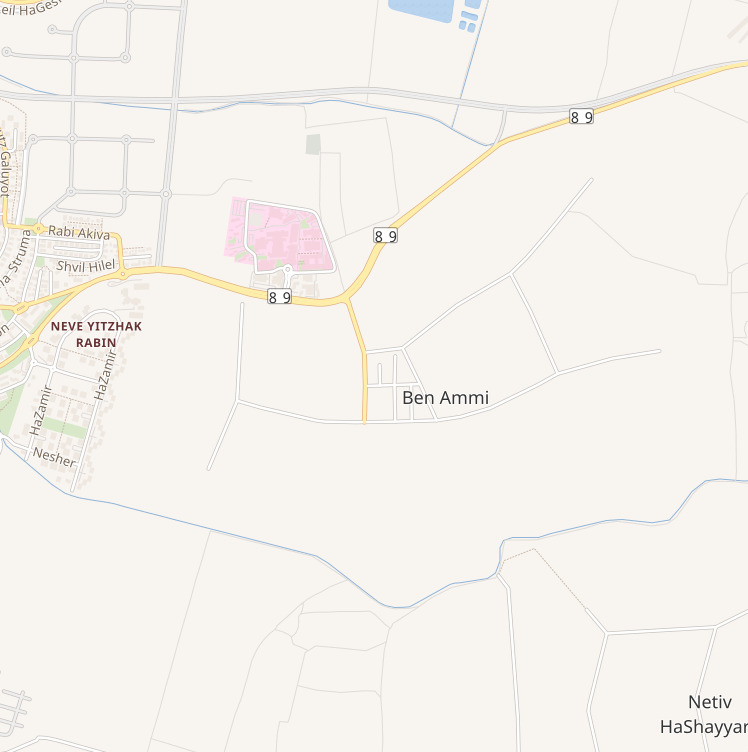
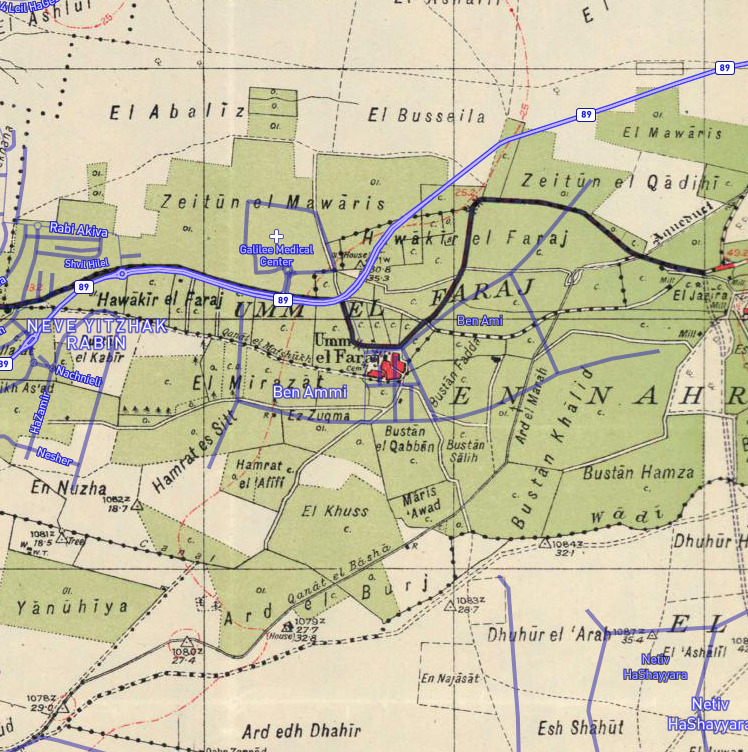
- 1870s map 1940s map modern map 1940s with modern overlay map A series of historical maps of the area around Umm al-Faraj (click the buttons)

- Location within Mandatory Palestine
- Coordinates: 33°00′18″N 35°07′16″E
- Palestine grid: 162/267
- Geopolitical entity: Mandatory Palestine
- Subdistrict: Acre
- Date of depopulation: 21 May 1948

Area
  - Total: 825 dunams (82.5 ha; 204 acres)

Population (1945)
  - Total: 800
- Cause(s) of depopulation: Military assault by Yishuv forces
- Current Localities: Ben Ami

Umm al-Faraj (Arabic: أم الفرج, known to the Crusaders as La Fierge), was a Palestinian village, depopulated in 1948.

== Location ==
The village was situated on a flat spot in the Acre plain, 10.5 kilometers (6.5 mi) northeast of Acre.

== History ==
Archaeological remains from the Roman and Byzantine eras have been found here.

Sugar Moulds found here indicate that sugar productions started in the 11th century, under the Fatimid era.

=== Crusader/Mamluk era ===
The village was known to the Crusaders as Le Fierge, and belonged to the fief of Casal Imbert. In 1253 King Henry granted the whole estate of Casal Imbert, including Le Fierge, to John of Ibelin. Shortly after, in 1256, John of Ibelin leased Az-Zeeb and all its depending villages (including Le Fierge) to the Teutonic Order for 10 years. In 1261, Az-Zeeb, together with Le Fierge and Le Quiebre, were sold to the Teutonic Order, in return for an annual sum for as long as Acre was in Christian hands. In 1283 it was still a part of the Crusader states, as it was mentioned as part of their domain in the hudna between the Crusaders based in Acre and the Mamluk sultan Qalawun.

According to al-Maqrizi, it had come under Mamluk rule in 1291, when it was mentioned under the name of Farah when sultan al-Ashraf Khalil allocated the village's income to a Waqf in Cairo.

Sugar production continued here during the Crusader and Mamluk eras.

=== Ottoman era ===
Incorporated into the Ottoman Empire in 1517 with all of Palestine, it appeared in the 1596 tax registers as Farja, being in the Akka Nahiya (Subdistrict of Acre), part of the Safad Sanjak (District of Safed), with a population of 24 households and 13 bachelors, all Muslim. The villagers paid a fixed tax rate of 20% on agricultural products, including wheat, barley, summer crops, cotton, goats and beehives, in addition to "occasional revenues" and a water mill; a total of 1,576 akçe. Half of the revenues were given to a waqf. Sugar production continued here to the beginning of the seventeenth century CE.

In 1799, the village was called El Fargi on the map of Pierre Jacotin. An inscription in marble, built into the wall above the gate of the village mosque, dates this building to 1254 H, (1838-39 C.E.).

In May 1875, the French explorer Victor Guérin visited the village. He described it as being surrounded by "delightful" gardens, irrigated with water from Nahr al-Mafshukh. Many houses were built with great care, and some had old pieces of stone built into them. He further noted that "the location of an old demolished church is still to a certain extent recognisable", and that all the 200 villagers were Muslim. In 1881, the PEF's Survey of Western Palestine described it as being built of stone and with a population of 200. The villagers planted fig, olive, mulberry and pomegranate trees.

A population list from about 1887 showed Um el Ferj to have about 690 inhabitants, all Muslims.

=== British Mandate era ===
In the 1922 census of Palestine conducted by the British Mandate authorities Umm al Faraj had a population of 322, all Muslims, increasing in the 1931 census to 415, 2 Christians and 413 Muslims, in a total of 94 houses. The older houses in the village were built close together and formed a circle, while the homes build after 1936 were scattered among the orchards. The population of Umm al-Faraj lived by agriculture.

In the 1945 statistics, the population of Umm al-Faraj was 800, all Muslims, with a total land area of 825 dunams. In 1944/45 a total of 745 dunams (0.745 km^{2}; 0.288 sq mi) was used for citrus and bananas, 18 dunams (0.018 km^{2}; 0.0069 sq mi) were used for cereals, 42 dunams (0.042 km^{2}; 0.016 sq mi) were irrigated or used for orchards, while 15 dunams were built-up (urban) areas.

=== 1948 War and aftermath ===
During the 1948 Arab-Israeli War, Umm al-Faraj was assaulted by Israel's Carmeli Brigade in the second stage of Operation Ben'Ami. The operational order, issued 19 May 1948, was to "attack with the aim of conquest, the killing of adult males, destruction and torching." The assault came on the 20–21 May 1948, when Carmeli forces attacked Umm al-Faraj together with Kabri, al Tell and Nahar, and then "demolished them," according to Morris.

Following the war the area was incorporated into the State of Israel. The moshav of Ben Ami was established in 1949, in part on village land.

The Palestinian historian Walid Khalidi described the village remains in 1992: "Only the stone mosque remains. It is shut and stands in a state of decay amid tall wild grass. Many trees that might predate the village's destruction can be seen. The nearby lands are cultivated; a banana grove belongs to the Ben Ammi settlement."

== See also ==
- Depopulated Palestinian locations in Israel

== Bibliography ==
- Al-Maqrizi (1845). Histoire des sultans mamlouks, de l'Égypte, écrite en arabe (in French and Latin). Vol. 2. Translator: Étienne Marc Quatremère. Paris: Oriental Translation Fund of Great Britain and Ireland.
- Barag, Dan (1979). "A new source concerning the ultimate borders of the Latin Kingdom of Jerusalem". Israel Exploration Journal. 29 (3/4): 197–217. JSTOR 27925726.
- Barron, J.B., ed. (1923). Palestine: Report and General Abstracts of the Census of 1922. Government of Palestine.
- Conder, C.R.; Kitchener, H.H. (1881). The Survey of Western Palestine: Memoirs of the Topography, Orography, Hydrography, and Archaeology. Vol. 1. London: Committee of the Palestine Exploration Fund.
- Dauphin, C. (1998). La Palestine byzantine, Peuplement et Populations. BAR International Series 726 (in French). Vol. III : Catalogue. Oxford: Archeopress. ISBN 978-0-860549-05-5.(p. 636)
- Ellenblum, R. (2003). Frankish Rural Settlement in the Latin Kingdom of Jerusalem. Cambridge University Press. ISBN 9780521521871.
- Fisk, R. (2001). Pity the nation: Lebanon at war. Oxford University Press. ISBN 978-0192801302. (For future expansion: Chapter 2: Mrs Zamzam in the Rashidieh refugee camp in southern Lebanon recalls Umm al-Faraj)
- Frankel, Rafael (1988). "Topographical notes on the territory of Acre in the Crusader period". Israel Exploration Journal. 38 (4): 249–272. JSTOR 27926125.
- Getzov, Nimrod; Stern, Edna J.; Shapiro, Anastasia (2016-10-02). "Umm al-Faraj (Moshav Ben Ami)". Hadashot Arkheologiyot – Excavations and Surveys in Israel (128).
- Government of Palestine, Department of Statistics (1945). Village Statistics, April, 1945.
- Guérin, V. (1880). Description Géographique Historique et Archéologique de la Palestine (in French). Vol. 3: Galilee, pt. 2. Paris: L'Imprimerie Nationale.
- Hadawi, S. (1970). Village Statistics of 1945: A Classification of Land and Area ownership in Palestine. Palestine Liberation Organization Research Centre.
- Hütteroth, W.-D.; Abdulfattah, K. (1977). Historical Geography of Palestine, Transjordan and Southern Syria in the Late 16th Century. Erlanger Geographische Arbeiten, Sonderband 5. Erlangen, Germany: Vorstand der Fränkischen Geographischen Gesellschaft. ISBN 978-3-920405-41-4.
- Karmon, Y. (1960). "An Analysis of Jacotin's Map of Palestine" (PDF). Israel Exploration Journal. 10 (3, 4): 155–173, 244–253. Archived from the original (PDF) on 2017-12-01.
- Khalidi, W. (1992). All That Remains: The Palestinian Villages Occupied and Depopulated by Israel in 1948. Washington D.C.: Institute for Palestine Studies. ISBN 978-0-88728-224-9.
- Khamisy, Rabei G. (2014). "The Treaty of 1283 between Sultan Qalāwūn and the Frankish Authorities of Acre: A New Topographical Discussion". Israel Exploration Journal. 64, 1: 72–102.
- Mills, E., ed. (1932). Census of Palestine 1931. Population of Villages, Towns and Administrative Areas. Jerusalem: Government of Palestine.
- Morris, B. (2004). The Birth of the Palestinian Refugee Problem Revisited. Cambridge University Press. ISBN 978-0-521-00967-6.
- Palmer, E.H. (1881). The Survey of Western Palestine: Arabic and English Name Lists Collected During the Survey by Lieutenants Conder and Kitchener, R. E. Transliterated and Explained by E.H. Palmer. Committee of the Palestine Exploration Fund.
- Rhode, H. (1979). Administration and Population of the Sancak of Safed in the Sixteenth Century (PhD). Columbia University. Archived from the original on 2020-03-01.
- Röhricht, R. (1893). (RRH) Regesta regni Hierosolymitani (MXCVII-MCCXCI) (in Latin). Berlin: Libraria Academica Wageriana.
- Schumacher, G. (1888). "Population list of the Liwa of Akka". Quarterly Statement - Palestine Exploration Fund. 20: 169–191.
- Sharon, M. (1999). Corpus Inscriptionum Arabicarum Palaestinae, B-C. Vol. 2. BRILL. ISBN 978-90-04-11083-0.
- Strehlke, E., ed. (1869). Tabulae Ordinis Theutonici ex tabularii regii Berolinensis codice potissimum. Berlin: Weidmanns.
