= Carmeli Brigade =

Israeli reserve infantry brigade

- חטיבת כרמלי
- Insignia 2nd Carmeli Brigade later renamed 18th Brigade Insignia of Carmeli Brigade
- Active: 1948 - present
- Country: Israel
- Allegiance: Israel Defense Forces
- Branch: Israeli Ground Forces
- Type: Reserve
- Role: Infantry Brigade
- Part of: 146th Division "Ha-Mapatz"
- Engagements: 1948 Arab–Israeli War; Sinai War; Six-Day War; War of Attrition; Yom Kippur War; First Lebanon War; Second Lebanon War; Gaza war; 2024 Israeli invasion of Lebanon

Commanders
- Current commander: Omri Rosencrantz
- Inaugural commander: Moshe Carmel

2nd "Carmeli" Brigade (Hebrew: חטיבת כרמלי, Hativat Carmeli, former 165th Brigade) is a reserve infantry brigade of the Israel Defense Forces, part of the Northern Command. Today the brigade consists of four battalions, including one reconnaissance battalion.

== History ==
The brigade was formed on February 22, 1948, during the 1948 Arab–Israeli War, when the Levanoni Brigade in the Galilee split into the 1st Golani Brigade and the 2nd Carmeli Brigade. In its early days, the brigade gained control over three battalions – the 21st, 22nd and 23rd – although, later during the war the 24th battalion was also established. It has since participated in all of Israel's major wars and nearly all major operations, including the Sinai War, Six-Day War, War of Attrition, Yom Kippur War, Operation Litani, the first and second wars in Lebanon, the Gaza war with its ramifications, and various operations during the Palestinian intifadas.

== Organization ==
- 2nd Infantry Brigade "Carmeli" (Reserve)
  - 221st Infantry Battalion
  - 222nd Infantry Battalion
  - 223rd Infantry Battalion
  - (224th) Reconnaissance Battalion "Carmeli"
  - 5222nd Logistic Battalion
  - 5172nd Signal Company
