= Kabri, Israel =

Kibbutz in northern Israel

Kabri: כַּבְרִי (Hebrew)
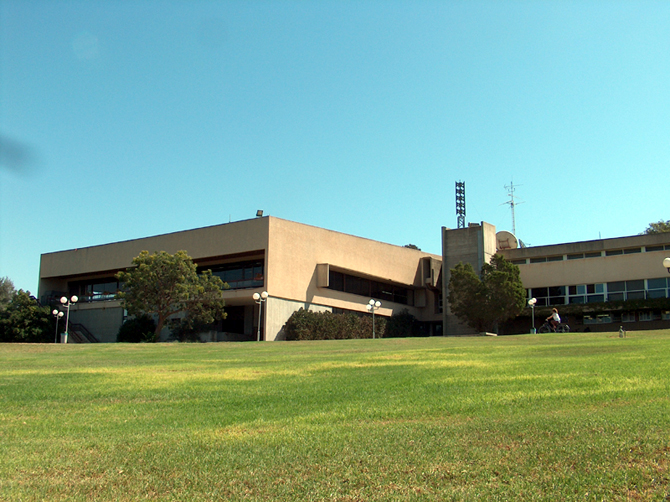
- The kibbutz's dining room was designed by the architect Hanan Havron

- Location within Northwest Israel Location within Israel
- Coordinates: 33°1′15″N 35°8′56″E
- Country: Israel
- District: Northern
- Subdistrict: Acre
- Council: Mateh Asher
- Affiliation: Kibbutz Movement
- Founded: 14000 BCE (First settlement); Post-Crusader period (Arab village); 1949 (Israeli kibbutz)
- Founder: Beit HaArava Residents and Youth Aliyah Refugees
- Population (2024): 1,068
- Website: www.cabri.org.il

Kabri (Hebrew: כַּבְּרִי, also transliterated Cabri) is a kibbutz in northern Israel. Located in the Western Galilee about 4 kilometres (2 mi) east of the Mediterranean seaside town of Nahariya, it falls under the jurisdiction of Mateh Asher Regional Council. In 2024 it had a population of 1,068.

The kibbutz is located on lands which used to belong to the depopulated Palestinian villages of Al-Kabri and al-Nahr.

== History ==
=== Prehistory ===
The area of Kabri Springs was first settled 16,000 years ago, during the Neolithic period. Permanent structures appeared around the year 10000 BCE. Archaeological digs uncovered the remains of an ancient city. The city was built around the year 2500 BCE and its territory ranged over 32 hectares (79 acres), which were surrounded by dirt embankments 7 metres (23 ft) high and 35 metres (115 ft) thick, on which were built guard towers.

The ancient city that existed 1 km to the southwest is known to archaeologists as Tel Kabri, though its Canaanite name is not known. It was a city-state in the heart of which was placed by the palace of the ruling monarch. The two-story palace was decorated with colourful frescoes and ornaments in Minoan style. Residents of the city (their number is estimated at 5,000) earned their living through agriculture and international commerce. Leftover bits and pieces of merchandise whose origins lay in Egypt, Turkey and Crete were found in the ruins and graves during the excavations. The city was connected to a port on the coast, apparently under Achziv. The city-state was completely abandoned around the year 1600 BCE for unknown reasons.

However, micro-geoarchaeological study of the palace in 2020 showed that walls and ceilings collapsed all at once prior to abandonment. When macroscopic data from five excavation seasons was reexamined, at least nine Potential Earthquake Archaeological Effects (PEAEs) were found and associated with the last occupation phase. This evidence has led to speculation that the Middle Bronze Age settlement was abandoned following an earthquake.

=== Ancient history ===
After a few generations, the Phoenicians established next to the abandoned city a fortress town on 1.5 hectares (3.7 acres), in which were found the weapons and kitchen equipment of Greek mercenaries, as well as a scarce bowl, in which was prepared the colour purple, the Phoenicians' main export. That settlement survived from the 9th century BCE until the end of 7th century, at which time it was destroyed by the Babylonians.

=== Modern history ===
The Palestinian village of al-Kabri existed at the site from the post-Crusader period until 1949. In 1948 the Yehiam convoy was ambushed while passing the village. According to Israeli historian Benny Morris, a subsequent Haganah attack led to the flight of most of the villagers, and others were killed in what became known as the Al-Kabri massacre. The Haganah planned to "destroy and burn" Al-Kabri and neighbouring villages in western Galilee. Later, Al-Kabri was among the villages razed to ensure that its residents "could and would never return."

In 1949 a new kibbutz was founded on the site of the village by displaced members of the kibbutz Beit HaArava and young refugees from the Youth Aliyah. Beit HaArava was located along the Jordan River near Jericho, and had been evacuated during the 1948 Arab–Israeli War, was subsequently destroyed by the invading Jordanian forces. Beit HaArava's children and noncombatant women members had been evacuated to the kibbutz Shefayim during the War of Independence. The members subsequently divided in 1949 into two groups. One became the founding member of Kabri and the other joined Gesher HaZiv, another kibbutz in the Western Galilee.

Shortly following the breakout of the Gaza war, Kabri was evacuated due to its proximity to the Lebanese border, and both of the regional schools in the kibbutz were converted into military bases.

== Geography ==
The kibbutz is situated near four natural springs, which provide water to it and the neighbouring moshavim of Ben Ami and Nativ HaShayara. There are also two archeological sites within its boundaries: Tel Kabri and a Byzantine well and mosaic floor. It commands a view of the Mediterranean and is within sight of the Lebanese border.

== Economy ==
The kibbutz supports itself from a successful banana plantation and from the avocado groves where most of the archaeological excavation has taken place through the ongoing archaeological expedition at Tel Kabri. The kibbutz also runs a metal and wax casting factory (Cabiran), a plastics factory (Ri'on), a restaurant, a regional auditorium, and a vacation village.

== Educational institutions ==
Two schools are located on the kibbutz grounds—the "Maayanot" regional elementary school and the "Manor-Kabri" regional high school, where children and youth of the kibbutz and nearby settlements receive their education. The high school particularly emphasizes education in the arts, offering majors (Grades 10–12) in music, visual arts, drama, and cinema/video. Owing to the educational programs offered in the performing arts and academic subjects from the state curriculum, it attracts pupils from all over the area. Former Knesset member and Kabri resident Daniel Rosolio taught at both schools.

There is also a childcare system for infants, toddlers, and kindergartners, and adult education with many cultural activities.

== Notable people ==
- Yardena Arazi, singer and entertainer
- Avishai Cohen, jazz bassist, composer, singer and arranger
- Elam Rotem, Early music expert, especially of the Jewish-Italian Baroque composer Salamone Rossi, attended High School here
- Eival Gilady, general
- Ori Reisman, painter
- Daniel Rosolio, politician and member of the Knesset
- Aviva Rabinovich-Vin (אביבה רבינוביץ'-וין), professor of botany, chief scientist at the Israel Nature and Parks Authority and an environmental activist, lived and was buried here
