= Tel Kabri =

Bronze Age archaeological site in Israel

- תל כברי (Hebrew)
- Rehov?
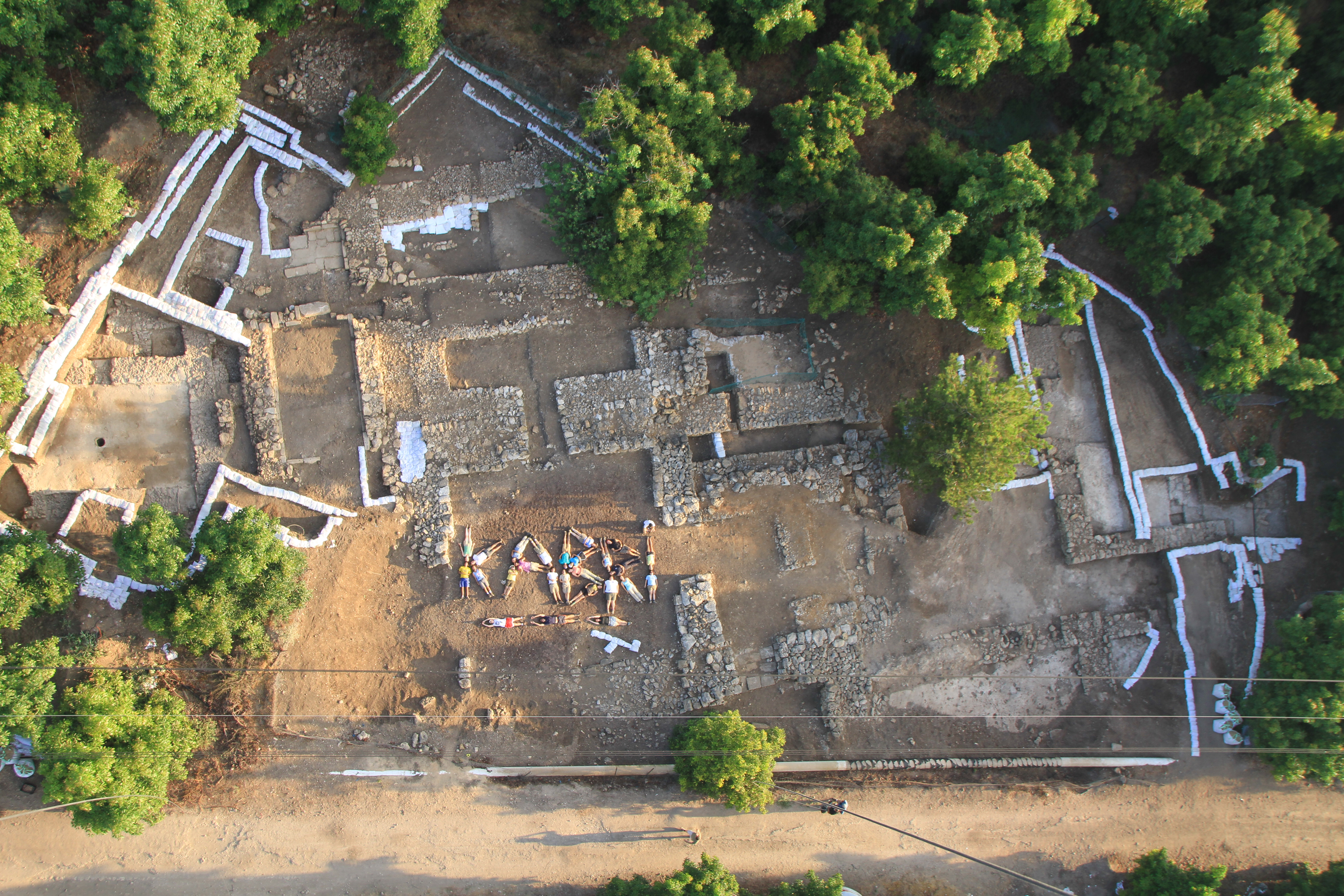
- Aerial photo of palace at Tel Kabri. 2013 excavation team is lying on painted plaster floor, spelling out 'Kabri'.

- Location within Israel Location within Northwest Israel
- 33°0′30.15″N 35°8′20.7″E
- Type: Settlement
- Periods: Pottery Neolithic – Byzantine
- Cultures: Yarmoukian, Wadi Raba, proto-Canaanite, Canaanite, Phoenician, Hellenistic, Jewish
- Location: Kibbutz Kabri
- Region: Upper Galilee

Site notes
- Material: Mudbrick, stone, plaster, mortar
- Area: 80 ha (200 acres)
- Excavation dates: 1957–1958, 1969, 1975–1976, 1986–1993, 1999, 2004, 2005–ongoing
- Archaeologists: Aharon Kempinski, Wolf-Dietrich Niemeier, Assaf Yasur-Landau, Eric H. Cline
- Owner: Private
- Management: Israel Antiquities Authority (IAA)
- Public access: No
- Website: digkabri2015.wordpress.com

Tel Kabri (Hebrew: תֵל כַבְרִי), or Tell al-Qahweh (Arabic: تَلْ ألْقَهوَة, lit. 'mound of coffee'), is an archaeological tell (mound created by accumulation of remains) containing one of the largest Middle Bronze Age (2,100–1,550 BCE) Canaanite palaces in Israel, and the largest such palace excavated as of 2014. Kabri is named for the abundance of its perennial springs the presence of which has led to the site's occupation and use as a water source from the Pottery Neolithic (PN) period (6,400–4,500 BCE) to the present day. Located in the Western Upper Galilee, the site was at the height of its power in the Middle Bronze, controlling much of the surrounding region. Kabri declined as a local power at the end of the Middle Bronze, but the site continued to be occupied at times, on a much reduced level, up until the 1948 Arab-Israeli War.

Since 1957, Tel Kabri has been excavated by the Israel Antiquities Authority (IAA), formerly the Israel Department of Antiquities and Museums (IDAM), as well as Israeli and American universities. Among the discoveries at the site by the two full-scale archaeological expeditions, (Note: The Tel Kabri Expedition (1986–1993) and The Tel Kabri Archaeological Project (2005–ongoing) are discussed in detail later in the text.) two have attracted particular attention from the archaeological community. The first finding to come to international attention was the discovery of Minoan-style frescoes in the palace at Kabri. As of 2009, these are the only Minoan paintings ever discovered in Israel. Second, in 2013, the Tel Kabri Archaeological Project uncovered the oldest and largest known palatial wine cellar in the Ancient Near East in Kabri's palace.

== Etymology ==
The name "Tel Kabri" was given to the site in 1956–58 by its Israeli excavators, who named it after the adjacent kibbutz Kabri, founded in 1949, itself named after the further adjacent historical Palestinian village of Al-Kabri. However, Tel Kabri was not the site of Al-Kabri, but rather two other depopulated Palestinian villages: Al-Tell and al-Nahr.

As of 2015, the original Canaanite name of Tel Kabri is unknown. (Note: Tel Kabri, as the name suggests is a tel, a type of mound found from the Balkans to the Punjab that is created as a result of the destruction of mudbrick from repeated different periods of occupation of a site.) Aharon Kempinski, who led excavations at the site, hypothesised that Kabri might have been the same city as Rehov, referred to in the Execration Texts, an Ancient Egyptian list of enemy polities. Amihai Mazar once believed that Tel Kabri – or the site of Tel Rehov – might be the Rehov from the Execration Texts, or Tel Kabri might be a different Rehov mentioned in topographic lists by Pharaoh Thutmose III. No definitive evidence has been found to support any of these hypotheses. By the Iron Age, 1200–500 BCE (IA), the site is known to have been called Rehov, and this continued into the Phoenician period – a period of Phoenician dominance over the area, which was concurrent with the Iron Age.

Early in the Roman Period (64 BCE–500s CE), the town of Kabrita had been established to the east of the tell. The site is mentioned in the 3rd century Mosaic of Rehob, as marking one of the northernmost bounds of Jewish resettlement after their return from Babylonian exile. Kabrita became the Arab village of el-Kabira, which by the late 1200s CE was called al-Kabrah by the Arabs and Le Quiebre by the Crusaders who controlled the area at the time. By 1880, both the village and the ruins on the tel had come to be associated and bear the same names. Al-Kabrah eventually became al-Kabri, and this name lasted until the 1948 Arab-Israeli War when the village was depopulated. Both the post-war kibbutz, Kabri, on whose grounds the archaeological site is located, and the tel itself, are named for al-Kabri. The name of Kabrita, and the later names, were derived from the triconsonantal Semitic root, 'כבר', meaning 'great or powerful', in reference to the plentiful water from Kabri's springs.

== Geography ==
Tel Kabri is at the eastern end of the Western Galilee coastal plain, located on the grounds of Kibbutz Kabri. It is less than 5 kilometres (3.1 mi) from the sea, and the Ga'aton River is nearby to the south, with the closest major city being Nahariyya to the west. The tell is home to four springs, Ein Shefa, Ein Giah, Ein Tzuf, and Ein ha-Shayara. It is these springs that have brought people to Kabri since the Neolithic.

Natural resources such as trees on the hills to the east and stone quarries near the coast were important for the inhabitants of the site. Kabri's height is partly a result of human activity. Over the centuries, material remains created layers that built up the tell. During Kempinski's excavations, it was found that the original surface in the Neolithic would have been up to 5.5 metres (18 ft) lower than the present surface.

== History ==
The tell and its surrounding area have been inhabited since the Pottery Neolithic (PN). (Note: 6,400–4,500 BC) Kabri was at the height of its power in the Middle Bronze, when the polity there controlled a significant portion of the Upper Galilee. After the Middle Bronze, Tel Kabri was occupied by later peoples – although on a much reduced scale – up to the founding of the State of Israel, when the kibbutz of Kabri was created.

=== Pottery Neolithic ===
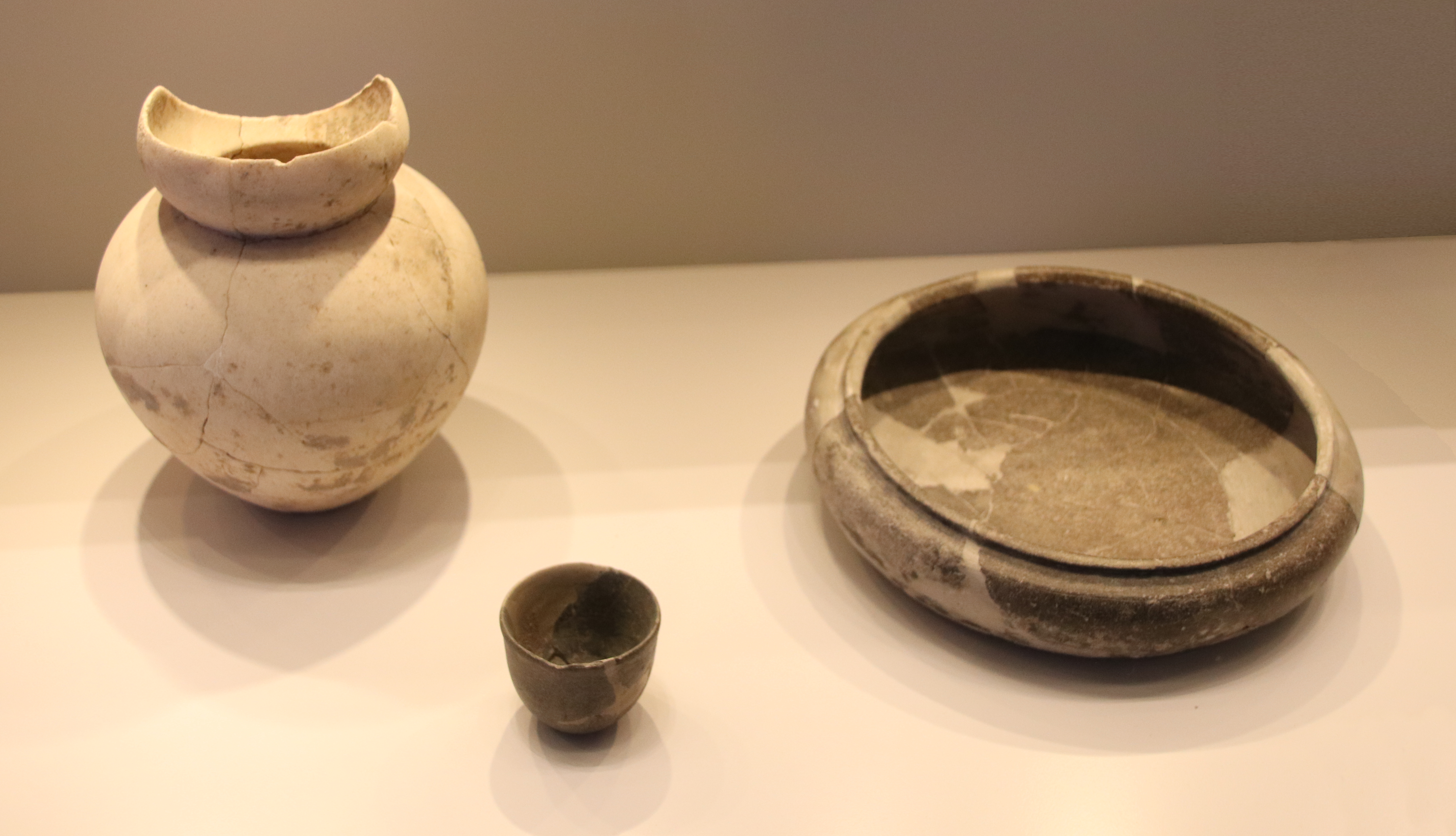
Tel Kabri alabaster and obsidian vessels, 5500 BCE. Israel Museum.

The area of Kabri was first settled during the PN by members of the Yarmoukian culture.

=== Chalcolithic ===
In the early Chalcolithic period (4500–3500 BCE), Kabri was a major centre of the Wadi Raba culture.

=== Early Bronze Age ===
In the Early Bronze Age (3600-2000 BCE), there was a town on the side of the tell that was destroyed as part of the region-wide systems collapse that characterised the Early Bronze collapse. (Note: The Early Bronze Age collapse is the event that is traditionally used to mark the end of the Early Bronze and the beginning of Middle Bronze. The "collapse" was an abrupt end to the material culture – such as pottery and architecture – that is identified with the Early Bronze civilisations of the Aegean, Anatolia and the Levant and the beginning of a period marked by the prevalence of so-called palatial society. As of 2015 there is no accepted explanation for this sudden change.)

=== Middle Bronze Age ===
In the early and middle Middle Bronze I, Tel Kabri – along with Megiddo, Aphek, and Akko – was one of the earliest cities in the Levant to rebuild its fortifications following the EB collapse. The new city was confined to the northern part of the earlier EB (Early Bronze) tell.

==== Palatial ====
Prior to the ongoing excavations at Kabri that began in 2005, (Note: As of 2015, excavations are ongoing.) archaeologists thought that there was only one palace at the site, (Note: A palace that had been found by Aharon Kempinski during the Tel Kabri Expedition of 1986–1993.) and that it was built in the period between the late Middle Bronze I (2200–1950 BCE) and Middle Bronze IIA (1950–1700 BCE). It was also thought that the Middle Bronze I period had been a transition phase. However, the palace found by Kempinski has been dated to the Middle Bronze IIB (1700–1550 BCE), and in 2010, a second, earlier, palace – a Middle Bronze IIA palace (Note: MB I and MB IIA are interchangeable terms. This palace is hereinafter referred to as the earlier palace.) – was identified beneath the Middle Bronze IIB palace. (Note: Hereinafter referred to as the later palace.) The remains of the earlier Middle Bronze IIA palace appear to show that it was expanded to create the later Middle Bronze IIB palace. The discovery of the earlier palace pushes the dates for palatial occupation of the site to the Middle Bronze IIA, 150 years earlier than originally believed. The earlier Middle Bronze IIA palace may have been "the most impressive structure in the Upper Galilee" at the time, and was possibly the oldest palace in Canaan.

Earlier still, at the transition between the Middle Bronze I and Middle Bronze II, a large-scale restructuring programme was undertaken in a possible effort to transform Kabri into an idealised Syrian-style city – a powerful city-state centred around a magnificent and well-fortified palace. The area was fortified, and an additional 25 hectares (250,000 m^{2}) were enclosed within a large glacis, a type of earthwork fortification that was 50 metres (160 ft) wide with a stone core and that encircled the tell as it appears today. The glacis was topped by mudbrick and stone. There was a Middle Bronze I palace and this was expanded into the Middle Bronze II palaces. This restructuring programme resulted in some parts of the tell being flattened out and a large portion of the population having to find new homes in the city, as a result of part of the Middle Bronze IIA palace – along with certain parts of the rampart – being built in an area previously occupied by private houses. Kabri's ancillary sites (such as Achziv and Avdon) were also built up, and migration from the hinterland to Kabri – and its secondary sites – increased dramatically as a result of these projects. Kabri became the capital of a major polity, with the newly expanded Middle Bronze II palace at its centre.

At the peak of its power, Kabri may have controlled a domain that stretched from Mount Carmel in the south to the Sulam range in the north, with as many as 31 vassal sites and 30,000 subjects. Kempinski hypothesised that Kabri might be the Bronze Age settlement of Rehov, a polity mentioned in the Execration Texts and the biblical Book of Joshua. During this period, Kabri maintained significant contacts with neighbouring regions in the form of trade and exchange of ideas.

Counting the Middle Bronze I, Middle Bronze IIA, and Middle Bronze IIB stages, the palace was continuously occupied for three centuries. This is longer than any other palace in ancient Israel.

Upon 2020 excavations of the Tel, it was revealed with high certainty that the Canaanite palace at Tel Kabri was destroyed in a major seismic event c.1700 BCE.

=== Late Bronze Age ===
==== Post-Palatial ====
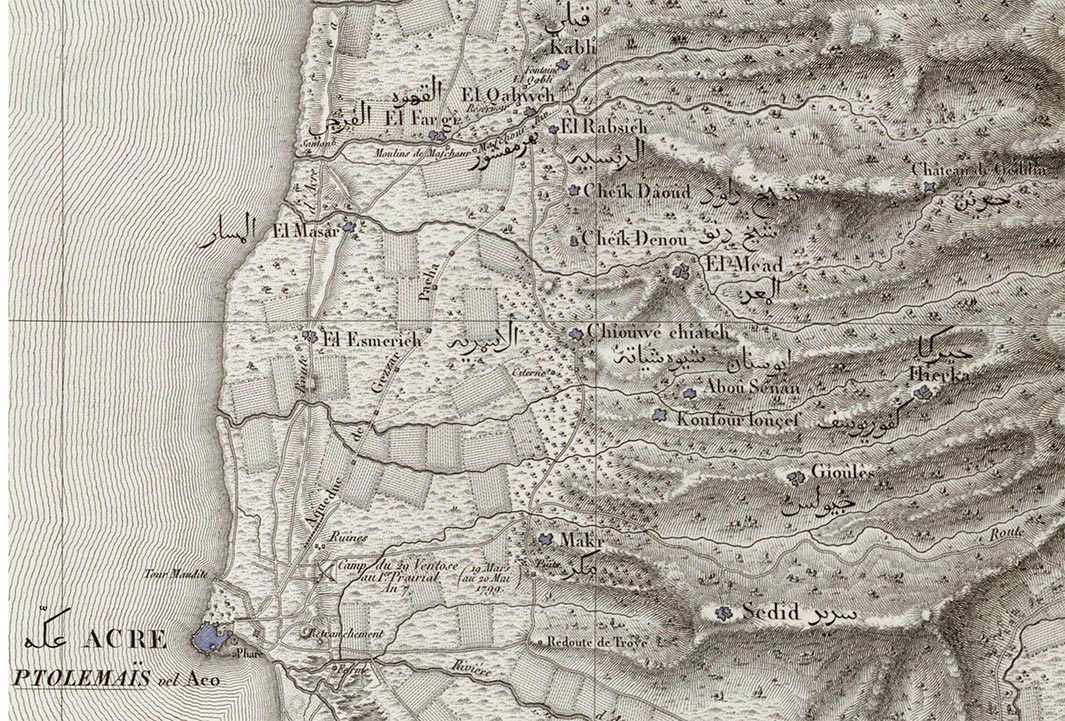
Ottoman period French survey map from 1799 showing the Upper Galilee. Kabri's springs are shown as being exploited by Akko.

By 1500 BCE, the site was abandoned for reasons unknown as of 2015. Some time after the abandonment, during the Late Bronze (LB) Age (1550–1200 BCE), a small village occupied the tell.

=== Iron Age ===
In the Iron Age, the site was reoccupied by Greek mercenaries under hire from the Phoenician city-state of Tyre. The mercenaries were based in a citadel there. Close to the citadel, in the Iron Age and Phoenician periods, the later Phoenician city of Rehov was sited at Kabri. The Phoenician town was fortified by a casemate wall.

This town was destroyed by the armies of the Neo-Babylonian king, Nebuchadnezzar II around 585 BCE, and his rule was extended over Phoenicia. After this destruction, the town was rebuilt and this new town grew during the Persian period (538–332 BCE). Remains from this time have been found near the tell's spring of Ein Shefa. Habitation at the tell itself ends at this point. Early in the Hellenistic period (332–64 BCE), the ruins of the Iron Age citadel were used for burials, but the tell was not resettled until the Ottoman period (1517-1917 CE).

=== Roman period ===
Some time during the Early Roman period, a Jewish settlement is mentioned, named Kabrita, located east of the tell in the area that was occupied by the later Arab village.

=== Crusader period ===
The Arab village at the site was named al-Kabri, appearing under the name of al-Kabrah in the last hudna, or peace treaty, between the Kingdom of Jerusalem (Note: Which by that point had been reduced to a remnant based out of Akko (called Acre).) and the Mamluks. (Note: A Turkic sultanate based in Egypt which ruled most of the Levant at the time) In the treaty, the village and its surrounding fields, are shown as belonging to the ruler of Acre.

=== Ottoman period ===
In addition to al-Kabri which is located east of the site, during the Ottoman period, two additional Arab villages were founded on the actual site – en-Nahr and et-Tell – in the southern and western portions of the tell, respectively. All three villages were close to the major springs, but during most of their existence, they were sparsely populated – in the low hundreds. Al-Kabri appears as Kabli and En-Nahr appears as el-Qahweh in the first topographic map of the region made in 1799 by Napoleon's cartographer, Pierre Jacotin. This same map does not show Et-Tell, and only shows a mill in that location. Et-Tell does appear in the later Palestine Exploration Fund map of 1880, and is talked about by Victor Guérin in his travelogue of the area, published that same year, which described all three villages. Karmon hypothesised that the new village of et-Tell might have been founded by villagers from el-Qahweh as a home for mill workers. The three villages existed up to the 1948 Arab-Israeli War when they were depopulated.

Much of Kabri's recorded history also deals with its springs and, starting in the Hellenistic period, the springs' relationship to the city of Akko. The springs of Kabri have fed Akko for centuries, and aqueducts have been built from Kabri to Akko by local rulers. In the Hellenistic period, an aqueduct was constructed at Kabri, and another was built during the governorship of Jezzar Pasha, the Ottoman ruler of Akko who also ruled the Eyalet of Sidon (1775-1804). (Note: An eyalet was an Ottoman administrative division corresponding to a province. Most of the Galilee, including Kabri, fell under the Eyalet of Sidon.) Later, a new aqueduct was built by Jezzar's successor, Sulaymán Páshá (Note: Jezzar's aqueduct had been destroyed by the military forces of Napoleon Bonaparte.) in the Ottoman period, and this aqueduct functioned up until the 1948 Arab-Israeli War. Portions of the structure still stand today.

Following the 1948 war, the tell was incorporated into the grounds of Kibbutz Kabri and was made into agricultural land. Soon after, the ancient remains of the site were rediscovered and on-and-off archaeological work began which continues to the present day alongside the agricultural work of the kibbutz.

== Archaeology ==
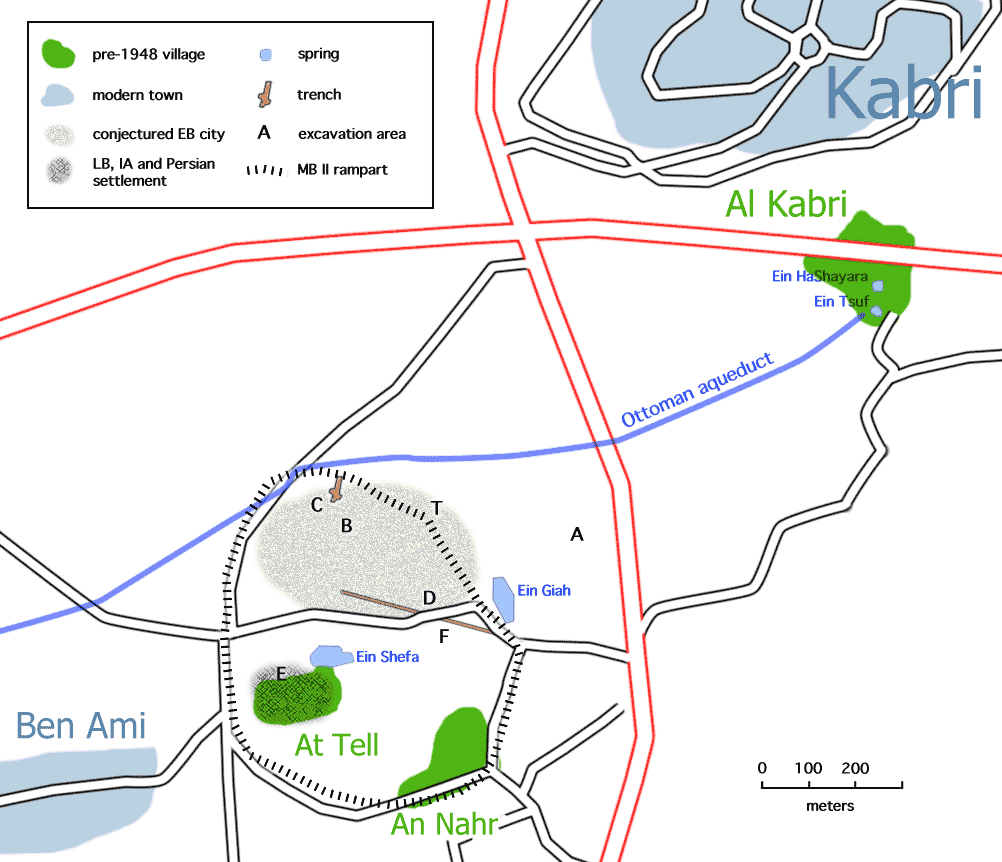
Tel Kabri in relation to old and new settlements

Tel Kabri has been a subject of archaeological study since 1957, following the discovery of Late Neolithic vessels at the site in 1956 by members of the kibbutz (collective settlement). After 1961, most of the focus on the site shifted to Bronze Age material remains. Surveys and excavations have taken place at the site to explore its past.

Tel Kabri is a multi-period site, meaning that it has layers, or "strata", of occupation dating from different time periods. The tell itself operates as an agricultural area of Kibbutz Kabri, and certain layers have been subject to damage as a result of agriculture activity.

The tell is located on the grounds of the kibbutz, and contains the remains of the Canaanite city from the Middle Bronze period and the partially excavated later Iron Age citadel. Tel Kabri is the only Canaanite city that can be excavated in its entirety because no other city with monumental architecture was built on the site after the Middle Bronze city. In 2013, it was estimated that the palace would have occupied 6,100 m^{2} (1.5 acres), and in 2006, it was estimated that the ancient city as a whole would have occupied 4 ha (10 acres).

As a result of farming and erosion, Stratum 1 of the tell, the uppermost layer, has been heavily damaged. (Note: Strata (sing. stratum) are layers of stratigraphy. Typically strata arranged in descending order, so Stratum 1 is physically on top of Stratum 2, which is in turn over Stratum 3, and so on. See the following section for a brief explanation of stratigraphy.) Prior to agricultural activities by the kibbutzniks in 1976, there still existed large towers on the tell, which may have been gates. The entire site is cut across by a British Mandate period (1920–1948) road that originally led from the coastal city of Nahariyya to the moshav of Me'ona. Most of the tell was also covered over with a metre of sterile top-soil (containing no archaeological remains) laid down for the purpose of farming by the kibbutz between Kempinski's excavations ending in 1993 and the beginning of the ongoing expedition in 2005. According to Tel Kabri Archaeological Project co-director Assaf Yasur-Landau: "The city's preservation enables us to get a complete picture of political and social life in the Canaanite period. We can reveal whether or not it had a central government, whether taxes were levied, what sort of agriculture there was and how politics were conducted at the time."

=== Stratigraphy ===
Kempinski identified twelve stratigraphic layers at Tel Kabri. Stratigraphy is the layering of soil with the more recent soil layers higher up and the older soil layers further down. Archaeologists and geologists use stratigraphy to date artefacts found in the soil relative to each other. (Note: See Relationship (archaeology) for further information on how the relationships between archaeological finds are determined.) The artefacts – in particular, sherds of pottery – can, in turn, be used to date the layer of soil and its contents to a specific date range. (Note: See Seriation (archaeology) for an explanation on how archaeologists can use pottery to create a timeline for the past.) The 1986-1993 Tel Kabri Expedition did not find a continuous stratigraphic sequence in any one excavation trench, and so Kempinski based the identification of the layers at Tel Kabri on finds in different areas. He arranged the layers as follows:

Stratum	Period	Areas studied
1	Hellenistic – Ottoman	E
2	LB – Iron Age II	E, and D
3	MB IIB	B, C, and D
4	MB IIA	B, C, and D
5	MB IIA	B, and C
6	EB III	Sherds found in rampart
7	EB II	B
8	EB II	B
9	EB IB	B
10	EB IA	B
11	EB IA	B
12	Late Neolithic/Chalcolithic	B

=== Areas ===
Tel Kabri is divided up into areas (some of which are shown in the table above) for practical purposes of organisation. (Note: As defined in Kempinski (2002a); p. 4-5) The first areas – A, B, and C – were designated during the 1975–1976 excavations by Kempinski and Prausnitz. Later Areas D, E, F, and T were opened by the 1986–1993 Tel Kabri Expedition, and Area D was subdivided by the ongoing Tel Kabri Archaeological Project starting in 2005.The following areas have been investigated as of the 2013 season.

- Area A – This area was designated Area A by Kempinski and Prausnitz during their 1975–1976 excavations. The area that would come to be called Area A was the first area of archaeological fieldwork at Tel Kabri. This was the survey of Area A in 1957 after Neolithic stone vessels had been found in 1956. This area was first excavated by Prausnitz from 1957 to 1958, when he found early Chalcolithic cist tombs and houses. Exploration in Area A has focused on the Neolithic and Chalcolithic aspects of the site. This area was not excavated during Kempinski's 1986–1993 Tel Kabri Expedition, and has not been excavated by the current Tel Kabri Archaeological Project, as of the 2013 season.
- Area B – First excavated by Ben-Yosef in 1969, the area was later excavated by Kempinski and Prausnitz in 1975 and 1976 who gave it the name, Area B. Kempinski's 1986-1993 expedition found some pottery from the MB II, but modern human activity had destroyed the layers of previous habitation.
- Area C – Like Areas A and B, Area C was named during Kempinski and Prausnitz's 1975–1976 excavations. Area C was a 40-metre-long trench cut into the rampart on the northern end of the tell in the first year of their expedition. During Kempinski's 1986–1993 excavations, the trench was expanded south so as to study the fortifications inside the city itself.
- Area D – First uncovered as a result of Mekorot's 1961 trench, which exposed the MB plaster floors. Area D is where the excavation on the MB palaces has taken place. Kempinski focused most of his efforts on Area D, and excavations during the ongoing Tel Kabri Archaeological Project have been confined to Area D. During the course of the ongoing Tel Kabri Archaeological Project, Area D has been sub-divided as follows:
  - Area D-West (2005, 2008–present) – First opened in 2005 to investigate a possible throne room for the final palace, D-West has been open every year during the portion of the expedition devoted to excavation, which started in 2008, for the purpose of further uncovering palatial structures. In 2013, a storage room was found in D-West which was later identified as a wine cellar.
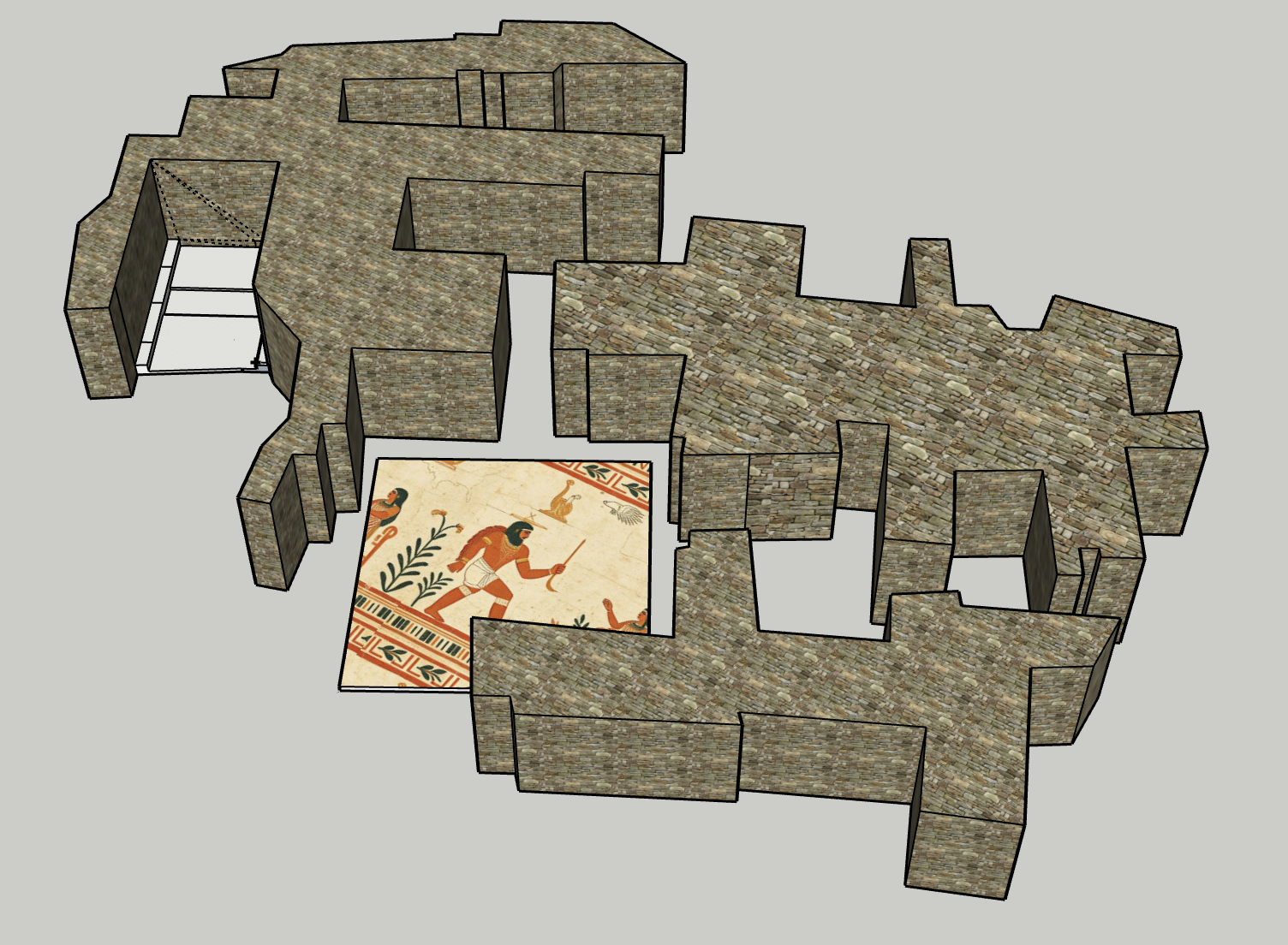
    3D model of archaeological site Area D-West of Tel Kabri. Contains walls that are speculated to be the height before ruin and an ai-generated fresco to represent the findings of Aegean-style fragments found on site.
    Excavations in the last decade have revealed that the throne room contains orthostat and ashlar paving slabs, which were architectural aspects unique to Aegean sites. These slabs lined the internal faces of the throne room – six slabs for the eastern wall and eight slabs for the western wall. They varied in length from 40–150 cm. Most of the orthostat slabs had rectangular dowel holes that were measured at 4 x 4 cm in size and 8 centimeters deep, with one hole being the exception. The presence of these orthostats and building techniques place more precedence on Aegean influence during the construction of parts of Tel Kabri, due to the drilling technique being different to the techniques compared to other sites in North Syria. The orthostats are made with beach rock and covered with white plaster. The slabs also feature square dowel holes that were chiseled into the top surface. Archaeologists have also found the presence of fragments believed to be parts of Aegean frescoes in Area D-South and Area D-West. Archaeologists theorise that this section of the palace was decorated with at least two sets of Aegean-style wall paintings and floors. One of these fragments was found to be 4 cm in size and painted with red or brown paint. Archaeologists led by Eric Cline theorised that the fragment was part of a fresco that depicted a landscape featuring a hilltop. The presence of Aegean art has led archaeologists to speculate that they were demonstrations of the power of the Kabri leadership, showing their connections with faraway regions and perhaps evidence of their desire to take part in interregional trade in the Mediterranean. The preserved part of the eastern wall of the building was measured at 1.1 meters in thickness and 6 meters in length and the preserved part of the western wall was measured at 1.0 - 1.3 meters in thickness and 6.8 meters in length. Archaeologists also discovered a backroom behind the orthostat building. The room was constructed using large plastered stones and was also found to contain three storage jars.
  - Area D-South (2005, 2009-2013) – In 2005, D-South was opened to investigate the southern portion of Area D which Kempinski and Niemeier hypothesised might be a religious area. Excavators found evidence of metal-working as well as what excavators referred to as a massive stone structure. When D-South was reopened in 2009, it was further subdivided into D-South 1 and 2 and remained as two areas in 2009 and 2011, and then just D-South 1 in the 2013 season. During the course of these excavations, a structure called the "Upper Terrace or Courtyard Building" or Building 3079 was exposed in both areas, which the excavators hypothesised might be part of an as of yet unexcavated monumental structure.
    - D-South 1 (2009-2013) – D-South 1 was opened in 2009 to investigate the massive stone structure found in 2005, which was found to be a wall corner and was further exposed towards the east in later seasons as building 3079. Building 3079 is a multi-room architectural complex located on the southern terrace of the Tel Kabri palace and is one of the best-preserved Middle Bronze Age II structures in Area D-South 1. Excavations show that the building was constructed over multiple phases, with its earliest remains belonging to Phase DS IIIb and later expansions assigned to Phase DS IIIa. Building 3079 is characterised by substantial fieldstone foundations, some exceeding 1m in thickness, indicating a massive superstructure. The upper courses were constructed in mudbrick, a typical building material in the Middle Bronze Age Levant. The preserved layout features several narrow rooms arranged around an open courtyard; however, the full plan is incompletely preserved due to erosion and subsequent disturbances. The courtyard itself featured a compact, crushed-limestone floor, while the interior spaces preserved patches of plaster and packed earth surfaces. In 2013, the excavators searched for additional structures, as well as the possible early stages of the city rampart. They found a wall which they believe may be part of the retaining wall for another building. Phase DS IIIb represents the earliest building stage, consisting of foundation walls and an initial layout whose exact function remains uncertain. In Phase DS IIIa, Building 3079 underwent significant renovation, including the addition of new wall segments, reinforcement of existing foundations, and the installation of improved floor surfaces. These modifications suggest a shift toward more formal or administrative use within the broader palatial complex. Although the building’s precise function is not definitively established, its scale, construction quality, and proximity to the palace indicate that it formed part of the administrative or service sector of the site. The excavators note that the robust architecture, including the “Upper Terrace” construction, may reflect an intentional effort to create an elevated courtyard space connected to the main palace precinct. The building appears to have been abandoned at the end of the Middle Bronze Age, with later disturbance layers (DS II/I) sealing its final surfaces.
    - D-South 2 (2009 and 2011) – D-South 2 was opened in 2009 so as to link areas excavated in 2005 in D-South with Area F as well as to investigate, further towards the west, the massive stone structure found in 2005 (later Building 3079). By 2011, the large structure had been identified, including a so-called "zig-zag wall" (based on its shape), and the excavators hypothesised that there might be a lower courtyard, as well as a thus far unexcavated monumental structure.
  - Area D-North (2005, 2013 as part of Area D-West East) – Opened in 2005 to locate a possible northern wall of the final palace which had been located by geophysical surveys. The results of the 2005 season in D-North supported an earlier hypothesis by Kempinski and Niemeier that there had been a large structure on the site of the later palace preceding its construction. In 2013, D-North was linked via D-West East to Kempinski's old Area D excavations.
  - Area D-West East (2013) – D-West East was opened in 2013 in an attempt to link up D-North with the portions of Area D excavated by Kempinski, as well as explore further rooms surrounding one of the final palace's courtyards, as well as to find a complete pottery assemblage free of possible contamination from other periods or locations in the palace.
- Area E – Area E was excavated in 1986 via a trench in the southwest of the tell after a survey found traces of Iron Age settlement. It was reopened from 1989 to 1990 and from 1992 to 1993. This area was investigated once more by Smithline in 2004 when he recovered significant amounts of Iron Age pottery, which add to the body of knowledge for the site's post-palatial ceramics.
- Area F – Area F was a portion of Area D created in 1990 as a result of Area D being physically cut in two by the Mandate period road. In both Kempinski's preliminary reports and on-site, Area F was treated as separate from Area D. However, both Kempinski's final report (2002) treated Area F as part of Area D. In 2009, Area F was reopened and excavated by the Tel Kabri Archaeological Project.
- Area T – Located in the northeast of the tell, this area was excavated in 1990 to investigate what Kempinski's team thought might be a tower. They found a section of well-preserved city wall instead.

Area excavations by year
Area	Expeditions						
Area	1957–1958 salvage excavation	1969 salvage excavation	1975–1976 salvage excavation	The Tel Kabri Expedition	1999 salvage excavation	2004 salvage excavation	The Tel Kabri Archaeological Project
Area A	1957-1958	–	1975-1976	–	–	–	
Area B	–	1969	1975-1976	1987-1992	–	–	–
Area C	–	–	1975-1976	1986-1989	–	–	–
Area D	–	–	–	1986-1993	1999	–	2005, 2009-ongoing
Area E	–	–	–	1986, 1989-1990, 1992-1993	–	2004	–
Area F	–	–	–	1990-1993	–	–	2009
Area T	–	–	–	1990	–	–	–
" – " denotes expeditions where area was not excavated.

== Archaeological expeditions ==
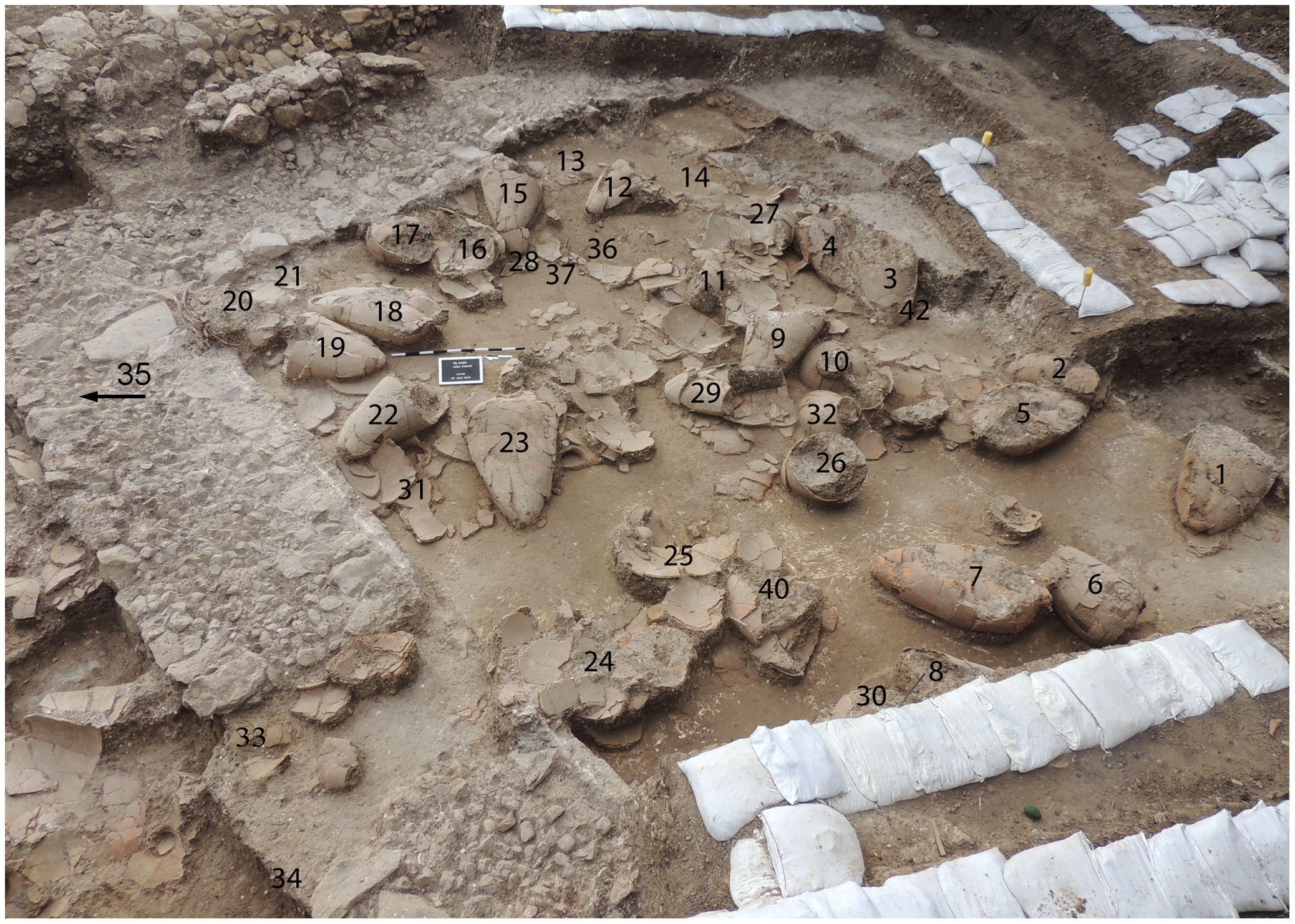
A view to the southeast of the 40 or so wine storage vessels in-situ in the D-West wine cellar in 2013. The expedition has numbered the vessels in the photo.

Archaeological exploration began at Tel Kabri in 1956. Since then, a survey, five minor excavations and two major excavations have been conducted,. (Note: Kempinski's 1986–1993 excavations, under the Tel Kabri Expedition, and the excavations by the Tel Kabri Archaeological Project ongoing since 2005) From 2015, Tel Kabri has been excavated by an international consortium, the Tel Kabri Archaeological Project. Among the finds are Minoan-style wall frescoes – of which there are four known at Kabri – and the oldest and largest known palatial wine cellar in the Ancient Near East.

Before the large-scale excavations by Aharon Kempinski (1986-1993), surveys and smaller excavations were conducted to rescue artefacts. This began when the archaeological remains of the tell were first discovered in the 1950s after kibbutzniks started coming across Neolithic artefacts near the local spring of Ein Giah. In 1956, on behalf of IDAM, the forerunner of today's Israel Antiquities Authority, David Alon and Daniel Rosolio conducted a survey in the area where the Neolithic artefacts had first been found earlier in the same year. They came across fortifications from the MB, and this survey led to salvage excavations in the following two years of what would later become Area A. In 1961, public works by the national water company revealed Bronze Age architectural remains in the form of a palace floor. In 1969, another rescue excavation was launched to investigate MB IIA tombs revealed as a result of agricultural activity by the kibbutz. From 1975 to 1976, a salvage excavation was conducted to examine areas exposed in 1957, 1958, 1961, and 1969

From 1957 to 1958, The first rescue excavations were carried out by Moshe Prausnitz working with the IDAM, joined by Robert Stigler of Brandeis University. Prausnitz focused on Area A where the surveyors, Alon and Rosoliyo, had first investigated the Neolithic implements found by the kibbutzniks in 1956. His expedition found Neolithic 'cist' tombs as well as round and rectangular dwellings from the lower part of the city.

In 1961, after Prausnitz's excavation, a large trench was cut into the tell by Israel's national water company, Mekorot, so as to incorporate the local springs into the national water system. This led to exploration into the EB and MB archaeological remains at Kabri. The stratigraphy from the Mekorot trench was photographed and revealed the existence of the Bronze Age settlements. It also revealed the plaster floors – the first evidence of what would later be identified as the MB II palaces. The trench also cut into – and revealed the existence of – the MB II rampart.

In 1969, as a result of the kibbutz removing an orchard from the tell, MB II tombs containing grave goods were found in what had been the lower city. Their findspot (Note: Later designated as Area B in the 1975–1976 excavations.) was excavated by Y. Ben-Yosef for the IDAM that same year.

From 1975 to 1976, salvage excavations were carried out by Prausnitz representing the IDAM, Kempinski of Tel Aviv University (TAU), and Ruth Amiran of the Israel Museum, to explore the area where the MB II tombs had been found, the lower city, the earthen rampart, and the Neolithic layers of the site. Among their finds was a 2.10 metres (6.9 ft) tall stela that had a polished face but no inscription. Following this excavation, Kempinski focused his work on Tel Kabri and applied for permits from the IDAM and permission from Kibbutz Kabri to conduct a large-scale excavation of the site.

In 1986, large-scale excavations began at Tel Kabri, initially under the direction of Kempinski for TAU, and from 1989 onwards, Kempinski and Wolf-Dietrich Niemeier for Heidelberg University, until Kempinski died in July 1994, and the expedition was discontinued. Between 1986 and 1988, the first remains of the MB palaces were discovered near the spring of Ein Shefa, along with a contemporaneous residential area. The portion of the palace initially excavated included a 10 by 10 metres (33 by 33 ft) hall, with a Minoan-style decorated plaster floor. The style of the floor is closest to what is referred to as the 'Cretan-Theran Late Minoan IA' tradition of wall painting. They also found more than 2,000 Aegean-style painted plaster fragments. It was during the course of Kempinski's excavations that an Iron Age Phoenician citadel was also discovered. The site's excavators believed this fortification was occupied by Greek mercenaries based on the pottery found there.

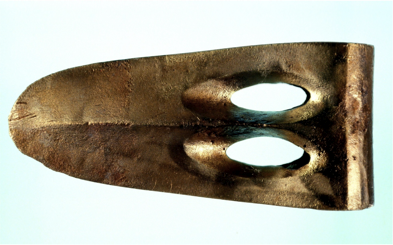
An MB II duck-billed axe recovered during the 1988 excavations.

In the first year of the Kempinski expedition, work was carried out in Area C, (Note: which had been designated during the 1975–1976 excavations.) and continued each year through the 1991 season. In 1986, Areas D and E were opened and excavated for the first time. Area D was, and is, home to the MB palace, which became the focus of Kempinski's excavations for the duration of his expedition, which was the first to excavate the palace intentionally (after the accidental excavation by the Mekorot water company in 1961). Area D was excavated each year by Kempinski's team. In 1987, the Kempinski expedition discovered the entranceway to what would be designated as Hall 611 in the palace, the ceremonial hall with the painted plaster floor. Area E was excavated every year except 1987, 1988, and 1991, and in the first year, 1986, yielded Iron Age Greek pottery. In 1987, new work was carried out in Prausnitz's Area B and continued each year through 1992. During the 1988 excavation, a large family tomb was discovered in Area C, and MB II bronze artefacts, such as a "duck-billed axe" from Area B (see picture to the right), were also recovered from tombs in both Areas B and C.

At the start of the 1989 season, German Archaeologist, Wolf-Dietrich Niemeier, joined Kempinski's Tel Kabri Expedition as his co-director. Along with the excavations in Areas B, C, D, and E, additional work was carried out in the new Area F, (Note: An extension of Area D, again for the sake of organisation) which continued each year excluding the 1991 season, and in Area T, which was excavated in 1990. Area T was an area at the northern part of the tell opened to explore what looked like a surviving tower but the exploration of which resulted in finding well-preserved fortifications. In 1990, finds included a Phoenician seal impression which had both the name of the official who owned it and the year according to the Tyrian calendar. Also in 1990, the western portion of Hall 611 was completely revealed in Area D, and preliminary preservation efforts were completed on the hall's painted plaster floor. Work by the Kempinski expedition continued up though 1993. In Area E, work was done to investigate occupation of the site after the Iron Age – prior focus having been on the Bronze Age aspects of the site.

At the end of the 1993 season, the painted plaster floor in Hall 611 was covered over with geotextile, as the team expected to return the following summer in 1994. However, Kempinski's excavations never resumed past 1993, as Kempinski died in June the following year. In accordance with his wishes, Kempinski was buried at Tel Kabri.

Between the major excavations by Kempinski and the ongoing Tel Kabri Archaeological Project, two separate minor excavations were conducted by Dina Shalem and Howard Smithline. In 1999, Shalem headed up a salvage excavation ahead of a construction project on the Mandate period road running through the tell. Her team worked in Area D and came across EB architecture, as well as some Chalcolithic sherds and a possible surface from that period. In 2004, the Israeli telecommunications company, Cellcom, was laying down new telephone cable near Area E, and Smithline was asked to conduct a salvage excavation before the work started. He used this as an opportunity to investigate further the Iron Age aspects of the site. His team did not make any new discoveries, but did add to the collection of Iron Age I (1,200–1,000 BCE) and Iron Age II (1,000–586 BCE) pottery from the site.

In 2003, former Tel Kabri Expedition excavator, Assaf Yasur-Landau, and geophysicist, Yitzhach Makovsky, both then of Tel Aviv University, conducted an investigation to see if Kempinski and Niemeier had underestimated the size of the palace at Tel Kabri. They conducted electric resistivity and magnetometric soundings in an attempt to map out the architectural features under the soil without having to dig trenches. Their findings showed that the palace was indeed larger than previously thought. With these results, Yasur-Landau approached his former Megiddo Expedition colleague, Prof. Eric H. Cline of The George Washington University, the following year and asked whether he would like to co-direct new excavations at Tel Kabri. After devoting a year to getting the necessary funding and permits for excavation, the two were able to begin work on the site in the summer of 2005.

Since 2005, the renewed excavations have been conducted by the Tel Kabri Archaeological Project, an international team co-directed by Yasur-Landau, now of the Leon Recanati Institute for Maritime Studies at the University of Haifa, Cline on behalf of The George Washington University, and Prof. Andrew Koh of Brandeis University, which officially joined the consortium in 2013. The majority of these excavation seasons have taken place at the MB palaces in Area D of the tell, and, since 2009, have been semi-annual.

The first four seasons at Tel Kabri were dedicated to investigating the site's potential for future large-scale excavation. As a result, the 2005 season was exploratory in nature, featuring assessment of the site and minor excavations to determine the viability of conducting future work at the site.During the course of the season, additional palatial architecture was uncovered, and the palace was found to be twice as large as previously thought by Kempinski, thus confirming the results of the 2003 soundings by Yasur-Landau and Makovsky. Along with this, another structure – possibly communal or another palace – was discovered below the MB II palace. It was during the 2005 season that the first find of a gold artefact at Kabri was made.

The team also found that in the time between the end of Kempinski's excavations and the start of the new expedition, there had been significant damage done to the site by the elements. The most apparent example of this was the geotextile that had been placed by Kempinski to cover the painted plaster floor in the palace hall. Since 1993, the geotextile had bonded to the plaster, and this made it impossible to remove the geotextile without destroying the floor. As a result of this, much of the work done in the 2005 season was also conservation work.

The following 2006 season was a series of surveys of the region around Kabri. The goals of this season were only partially fulfilled during the original timeframe though, as the 2006 season coincided with the 2006 Lebanon War. The team was able to survey MB II sites in the area around the site and see how they would have interacted with Kabri in that time period. However, as a result of the war, they had to postpone any aerial photography of the tell – by order of the Israeli Air Force – and access to the pottery from previous excavations – held in the IAA storerooms at Kibbutz Beit HaEmek – was restricted for the duration of the war. In that time period, the IAA did allow the team to remove the relevant pottery from Beit HaEmek (Note: This was a result of Beit HaEmek being under continuous bombardment.) to Tel Aviv for study, where the pottery could also be kept safe. The team had to wait until mid-September to achieve its goals fully. As a result of the dangers posed by the rockets from the north, (Note: Six rockets struck the tell and one rocket hit the kibbutz itself.) some members of the team had to return to their home countries, without completing their work.

The 2007 season was partly devoted to finishing the work that had to be halted in the 2006 season, as well as preparing the site for excavation the following season. Through comparative studies of pottery, the team was able to map out Kabri's rise to regional power in the MB II. The architecture of the palace was mapped out using a total station, and a digital topographic map was made of the tell using aerial photography and measurements on the ground.

The 2008 season saw a return to excavation at the site, with a focus on the palace in Area D that had been discovered by Kempinski. The team wanted to go deeper and explore the possibility of there being a palace beneath the one Kempinski found. They managed to get a clearer picture of the entire MB palatial area up to the 1600s BCE destruction, and recovered further wall plaster fragments. The structure underneath the MB II palace was determined most likely to be a palace itself, and further fragments of Aegean wall frescos and imported pottery were found, allowing the excavators to push back the time for contact with the Aegean and Cyprus to the MB I period. At the close of the dig season, the site was covered up to preserve it in the off-season.

2009 was the first year of large-scale excavation by the expedition, and the first year that the system of semi-annual excavation – with the off-years devoted to data-processing – was implemented and was in use as of the 2013 season. The 2009 season was also the only year that two separate seasons of excavations were conducted: a summer large-scale excavation, and a winter minor excavation. During the summer season of 2009, additional Aegean style frescoes were found at the site. In Area D-West, the northern bounds of the palace were successfully determined, and a corridor was discovered that held restorable pottery. During the winter season, the corridor in D-West was revisited, so that its use could be determined. As a result of these excavations, the date for the construction of the earliest palace was revised and estimated to be in the MB I period in the 1800s BCE, making the palace at Kabri one of the oldest palaces in Canaan.

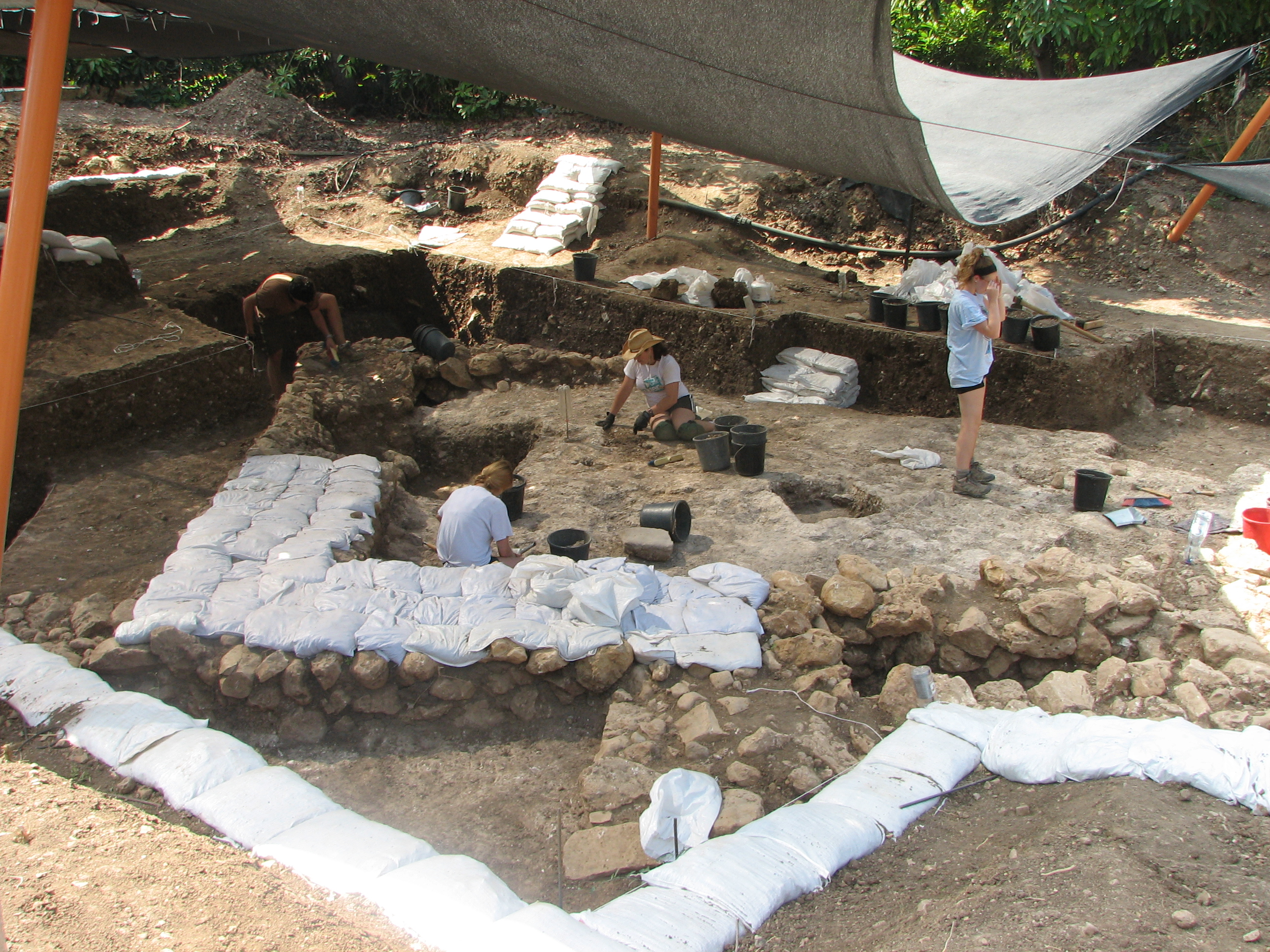
2011 excavations in Area D South-1

The main finds of the 2011 season included an orthostat building close to the palace, further pieces of painted plaster, and a scarab of the Second Intermediate Period.

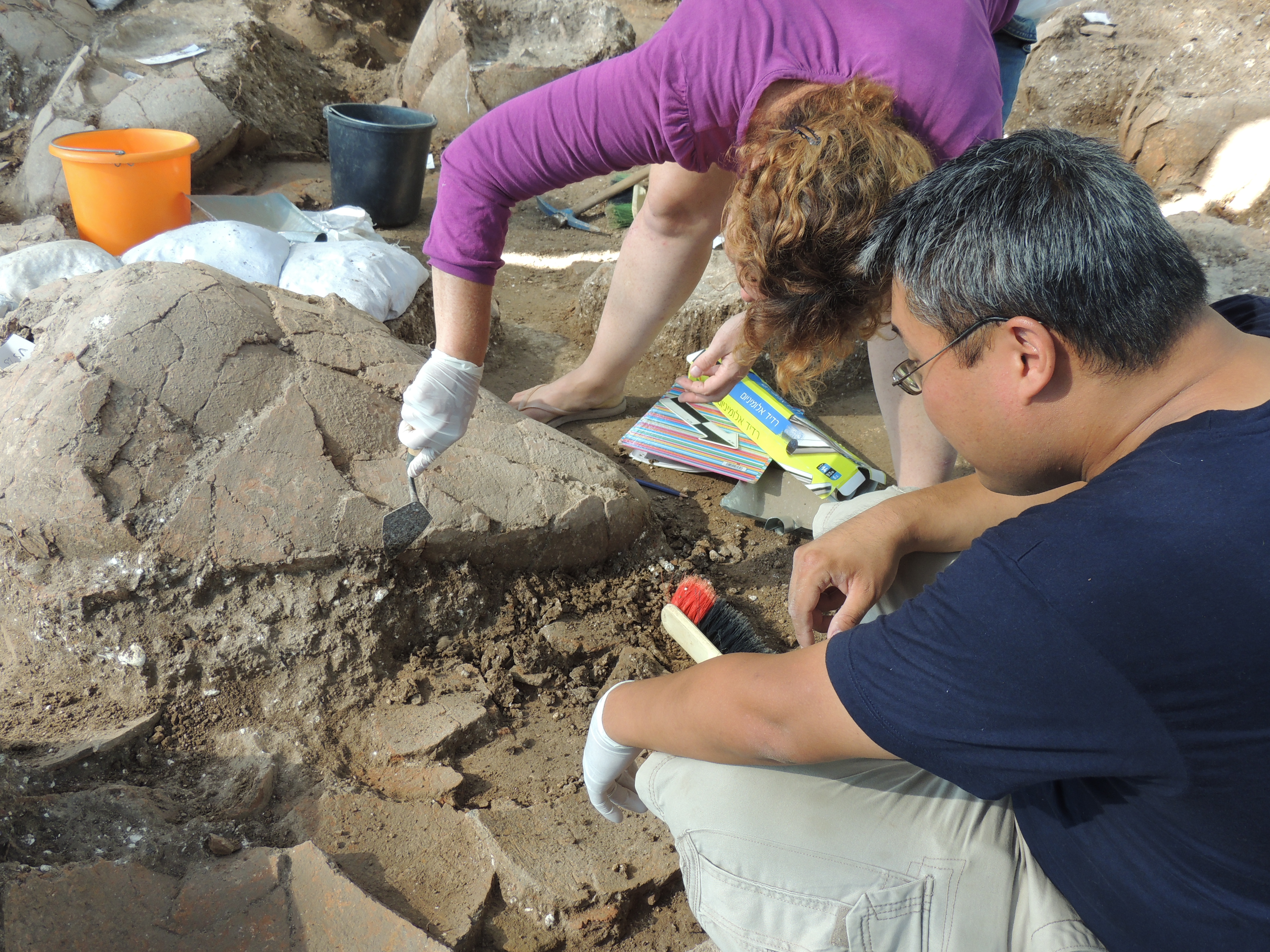
Nurith Goshen, area supervisor of Area D-West, and Andrew Koh, associate director of the Tel Kabri Archaeological Project, articulating a vessel in the Tel Kabri wine cellar. (Note: Area D-West is where the wine cellar was found. Andrew Koh, and students from Brandeis University, were responsible for doing the residue analysis on the wine jars in the storage room, which led to the room's identification as a wine cellar.)

During the 2013 season, the Tel Kabri Archaeological Project discovered the first known complete MB storage room in Canaan. On 22 November 2013, the team announced that this storage room had been found to be the oldest palatial wine cellar in the Ancient Near East, with 40 large ceramic jars, totalling 2,000 litres in capacity, (Note: The equivalent of 3,000 750ml standard wine bottles.) containing traces of wine dating to 1700 BCE. During the latter half of the season, the dig shifted its focus to Area D-West, where the wine cellar was located. To speed up the process of uncovering the vessels in the wine cellar, for part of the time, the team adopted the atypical practice of working in morning and afternoon shifts of 05:00 to 12:00 and 13:00 to 19:00, respectively, almost exclusively in Area D-West. (Note: Near Eastern summer archaeological digs typically dig in the morning only so as to avoid the afternoon heat. Exceptions are made when time is a constraint or the collecting of artefacts is urgent.) Prior to the actual removal of the vessels, LiDAR work was done on the site, for the first time, in this area. Near the end of the season, red plaster fragments were discovered while the area was being cleaned. However, the finds were not restricted to Area D-West. In Area D-South, a deposit was discovered that held additional pieces of wall plaster. In Area D-West-East, the area of D-North was linked up with the areas excavated by Kempinski, thus unifying the whole area from D-North to D-West, exposing further architecture, and bringing the estimate of the size of the palace to approximately 6,000 m^{2} (65,000 sq ft). As a result of the discovery of two doorways in D-West at the end of the 2013 season, part of the 2015 season were to be devoted to exploring where – and to what – these doorways lead.

== Site reports ==
Below are the site reports that could be located for the archaeological work at Tel Kabri. They have been arranged chronologically, with internet links where available, for reference.

The reports for the 1957–1958, 1975–1976, 1999, and 2004 excavations were all published in journals, some in English and some in Hebrew. It was not until the Tel Kabri Expedition of Tel Aviv University under Kempinski that stand-alone excavation reports for Tel Kabri were published, and then Kempinski made sure to publish a report for each year – a practice that has continued with the ongoing excavations by the Tel Kabri Archaeological Project of The George Washington University and the University of Haifa. Reports for the 1969 survey could not be located.

=== 1956 Survey ===
- Stekelis, M., 1958, On the obsidian core found at Kibbutz Kabri. Eretz Israel 5: 35-37 (Hebrew)
- Stekelis, M., 1958, An obsidian core found at Kibbutz Kabri. Eretz Israel 5: 85* (English summary of the above.)

=== 1957–1958 salvage excavation ===
- Prausnitz, M. W., 1969, The excavations at Kabri. Eretz Israel 9: 122–129 (Hebrew)
- Prausnitz, M. W., 1959, "Kabri". Israel Exploration Journal 9: 268–269. (English summary of the 1957–1958 excavations.)

=== 1975–1976 salvage excavation ===
- Prausnitz, M. W., Kempinski, A., 1977, Kabri, 1976. Israel Exploration Journal, vol. 27, p. 165–166.

=== The Tel Kabri Expedition: 1986–1993 ===
Final Report

- Kempinski, A., 2002, Tel Kabri. The 1986–1993 Excavations. Edited by N. Scheftelowitz and R. Oren. Emery and Claire Yass Publications in Archaeology. Tel Aviv: Tel Aviv University.

Preliminary reports

Note that all preliminary reports by Kempinski's expedition are in English and Hebrew with the Hebrew sections summarised in the English section. Please note that the English sections use a different page numbering system where the pages are starred. this is to eliminate confusion from having a page 1 at the start of each cover.

- Kempinski, A. (1987). Excavations at Kabri, 1: Preliminary Report of the 1986 Season. Tel Aviv: Tel Aviv University Press.
- Kempinski, A. (1988). Excavations at Kabri, 2: Preliminary Report of the 1987 Season. Tel Aviv: Tel Aviv University Press.
- Kempinski, A. (1989). Excavations at Kabri, 3: Preliminary Report of the 1988 Season. Tel Aviv: Tel Aviv University Press.
- Kempinski, A.; Niemeier, W. D. (1990). Excavations at Kabri, 4: Preliminary Report of the 1989 Season. Tel Aviv: Tel Aviv University Press.
- Kempinski, A.; Niemeier, W. D. (1991). Excavations at Kabri, 5: Preliminary Report of the 1990 Season. Tel Aviv: Tel Aviv University Press.
- Kempinski, A.; Niemeier, W. D. (1992). Excavations at Kabri, 6: Preliminary Report of the 1991 Season. Tel Aviv: Tel Aviv University Press.
- Kempinski, A.; Niemeier, W. D. (1994). Excavations at Kabri, 7–8: Preliminary Report of the 1992–1993 Seasons. Tel Aviv: Tel Aviv University Press.

=== 1999 salvage excavation ===
- Results of a Salvage Excavation at Tel Kabri

=== 2004 salvage excavation ===
- Tel Kabri Final Report

=== The Tel Kabri Archaeological Project: 2005–ongoing ===
The Tel Kabri Archaeological Project has published preliminary reports for each season of excavation online. As of 2015, there is no collected site report.

- 2005 preliminary report
- 2006 preliminary report
- 2007 preliminary report
- 2008 preliminary report
- 2009 preliminary report
- 2009 winter session preliminary report
- 2011 preliminary report
- 2013 preliminary report
- 2019 preliminary report

=== 2017 Salvage Excavation ===
In 2017 a salvage excavation was conducted at a site 200 meters south of Tel Kabri in response for planned agricultural activity. A considerable number of pottery shards were found in the excavation squares dated to Middle Bronze II.

== See also ==
- List of cities of the ancient Near East
- Tell (archaeology)

Other Near Eastern sites with Minoan-style frescoes:

- Alalakh, Turkey
- el-Dab'a, Tell, Egypt
- Qatna, Syria

== Bibliography ==
=== Works cited ===
- Anon (Autumn 1988). "Appendix D: Maps: Arab Villages Emptied and Jewish Settlements Established in Palestine, 1948–49". Journal of Palestine Studies. 18 (1, Special Issue: Palestine 1948): 38–50. doi:10.2307/2537593. JSTOR 2537593.
- Aviram, M. (1997). "Appendix: The Significance of the Coin of Agrippa II from Cave 3 near Kabri". 'Atiqot. English Series. 33: 23.
- Barag, D. (1979). "A New Source Concerning the Ultimate Borders of the Latin Kingdom of Jerusalem". Israel Exploration Journal. 29 (3–4): 197–217. JSTOR 27925726.
- Burrows, Leah (22 November 2013). "Archaeologists discover largest, oldest palatial wine cellar". BrandeisNOW.
- Cline, E. H. (2009). Biblical Archaeology: A Very Short Introduction. New York: Oxford University Press. ISBN 978-0-19-534263-5.
- Cline, E. H.; Yasur-Landau, A. (2006a). "Results of the 2006 Season Kabri Regional Archaeological Survey Project" (PDF).
- Cline, E. H.; Yasur-Landau, A. (January–February 2006b). "Your Career is in Ruins: How to Start an Excavation in Five Not-So-Easy Steps" (PDF). Biblical Archaeology Review. 32 (1): 34–37, 71.
- Cline, E. H.; Yasur-Landau, A. (2007). Morris, S.P. (ed.). "Poetry in Motion: Canaanite Rulership and Aegean Narrative at Kabri" (PDF). EPOS: Reconsidering Greek Epic and Aegean Bronze Age Archaeology. Aegaeum. 28.
- Cline, E. H.; Yasur-Landau, A.; Pierce, G. A. (2008). "Middle Bronze Age Settlement Patterns in the Western Galilee, Israel" (PDF). Journal of Field Archaeology. 33 (1): 59–83. doi:10.1179/009346908791071330. S2CID 3910662.
- Cline, E. H.; Yasur-Landau, A.; Goshen, N. (2011). "New Fragments of Aegean-Style Painted Plaster from Tel Kabri, Israel" (PDF). American Journal of Archaeology. 15 (2).
- Finkelstein, I.; Frankel, R. (1983). "'The Northwest Corner of Eretz-Israel' in the Baraita 'Boundaries of Eretz-Israel'". Cathedra: For the History of Eretz Israel and Its Yishuv (in Hebrew). 27 (27). JSTOR 23398920.
- Frankel, R. (2002). "The Hellenistic Aqueduct of Akko-Ptolemais". In Amit, D.; Patrich, J.; Hirshfeld, Y. (eds.). The Aqueducts of Israel. Supplementary Series. Vol. 46. Portsmouth, Rhode Island: Journal of Roman Archaeology. ISBN 978-1-887829-46-5. ISSN 1063-4304.
- Guérin, V. (1880). Description géographique, historique et archéologique de la Palestine (in French). Vol. 3 ptie. t. 2. Paris: L'Imprimerie Nationale. pp. 31–33, 46, 50. LCCN 53055447. OL 6147851M.
- Horowitz, A. (2002). "Chapter 2: The Natural Environment". In A., Kempinski (ed.). Tel Kabri: The 1986–1993 Excavations Seasons. Emery and Claire Yass Publications in Archaeology. pp. 7–14. ISBN 978-965-266-015-2.
- Ingeno, L. (8 January 2015). "Minoan Frescoes at Tel Kabri". GW Magazine. Winter 2015.
- Issar, A. S.; Zohar, M. (2004). Climate Change: environment and civilization in the Middle East. Berlin: Springer. ISBN 978-354-021-086-3.
- Kahanov, Y. (March 2011). "Graffiti of Ships in the Bahá'í Mansion at Mazra'ih, Israel". International Journal of Historical Archaeology. 15 (1): 102–15. doi:10.1007/s10761-010-0129-3. ISSN 1573-7748. S2CID 145630692.
- Karmon, Y. (1960). "An analysis of Jacotin's map of Palestine" (PDF). Israel Exploration Journal. 10 (3–4): 155–173 and 244–253. Archived from the original (PDF) on 2019-12-22.
- Kempinski, A. (1989). Excavations at Kabri, 3: Preliminary Report of the 1988 Season. Tel Aviv: Tel Aviv University Press.
- Kempinski, A. (1992). The Architecture of Ancient Israel: From the Prehistoric to the Persian Periods. Jerusalem: Israel Exploration Society. ISBN 978-965-221-013-5.
- Kempinski, A. (2002). Scheftelowitz, N.; Oren, R. (eds.). Tel Kabri: The 1986–1993 Excavations Seasons (in English and Hebrew). Tel Aviv: Emery and Claire Yass Publications in Archaeology. ISBN 978-965-266-015-2.
- Kempinski, A. (2002a). "Chapter 1: Introduction". In A., Kempinski (ed.). Tel Kabri: The 1986–1993 Excavations Seasons. Emery and Claire Yass Publications in Archaeology. pp. 1–6. ISBN 978-965-266-015-2.
- Kempinski, A. (2002b). "Chapter 17: Conclusion: The History of the Site and the Region; I: The Late Neolithic to Persian Period". In A., Kempinski (ed.). Tel Kabri: The 1986–1993 Excavations Seasons. Emery and Claire Yass Publications in Archaeology. pp. 449–452. ISBN 978-965-266-015-2.
- Kempinski, A. (2002c). "Chapter 4: Stratigraphy and Architecture; II: Area C". In A., Kempinski (ed.). Tel Kabri: The 1986–1993 Excavations Seasons. Emery and Claire Yass Publications in Archaeology. pp. 35–54. ISBN 978-965-266-015-2.
- Kempinski, A. (2002d). "List of Excavation Staff". In A., Kempinski (ed.). Tel Kabri: The 1986–1993 Excavations Seasons. Emery and Claire Yass Publications in Archaeology. pp. xv–xvi. ISBN 978-965-266-015-2.
- Kempinski, A.; Niemeier, W. D. (1990). Excavations at Kabri, 4: Preliminary Report of the 1989 Season. Tel Aviv: Tel Aviv University Press.
- Kempinski, A.; Niemeier, W. D. (1991). Excavations at Kabri, 5: Preliminary Report of the 1990 Season. Tel Aviv: Tel Aviv University Press.
- Kempinski, A.; Niemeier, W. D. (1994). Excavations at Kabri, 7–8: Preliminary Report of the 1992–1993 Seasons. Tel Aviv: Tel Aviv University Press.
- Khalidi, Walid (1992). All That Remains: The Palestinian Villages Occupied and Depopulated by Israel in 1948. Washington D.C.: Institute for Palestine Studies. ISBN 978-0-88728-224-9.
- Koh, A.; Yasur-Landau, A.; Cline, E. (2014). "Characterizing a Middle Bronze Palatial Wine Cellar from Tel Kabri, Israel". PLOS ONE. 9 (8) e106406. Bibcode:2014PLoSO...9j6406K. doi:10.1371/journal.pone.0106406. PMC 4146609. PMID 25162228.
- Lehmann, G. (2002). "Chapter 4: Stratigraphy and Architecture; IV: Area E". In A., Kempinski (ed.). Tel Kabri: The 1986–1993 Excavations Seasons. Emery and Claire Yass Publications in Archaeology. pp. 73–90. ISBN 978-965-266-015-2.
- Lopatto, Elizabeth (22 November 2013). "Oldest Wine Cellar Found in Ancient Site in Israel". Bloomberg.
- Marder, O.; al. (2002). "Chapter 7: Kabri 1975: The Flint Assemblage from Area A". In A., Kempinski (ed.). Tel Kabri: The 1986–1993 Excavations Seasons. Emery and Claire Yass Publications in Archaeology. pp. 299–306. ISBN 978-965-266-015-2.
- Marom, N.; al. (May 2014). "Shepherd Kings? A Zooarchaeological Investigation of Elite Precincts in Middle Bronze Age Tel Hazor and Tel Kabri". Bulletin of the American Schools of Oriental Research. 371 (371): 59–82. doi:10.5615/bullamerschoorie.371.0059. S2CID 164500050.
- Mazar, A. (1999). "The 1997–1998 Excavations at Tel Reḥov: Preliminary Report". Israel Exploration Journal. 49 (1–2): 1–42. JSTOR 27926875.
- Morris, Benny (2004), The Birth of the Palestinian Refugee Problem Revisited, Cambridge University Press, pp. 253–254, ISBN 978-0-521-00967-6
- Naveh, Y.; Kempinski, A. (1991). "Chapter 6: A Phoenician Seal Impression from Area E". In A., Kempinski (ed.). Tel Kabri: Excavations at Kabri, 5: Preliminary Report of the 1990 Season. Tel Aviv University Press. pp. 10*.
- Niemeier, B.; Niemeier, W. D. (2002). "Chapter 6: The Frescoes in the Middle Bronze Age Palace". In A., Kempinski (ed.). Tel Kabri: The 1986–1993 Excavations Seasons. Emery and Claire Yass Publications in Archaeology. pp. 254–285. ISBN 978-965-266-015-2.
- Niemeier, W. D. (September 2002). "Greek Mercenaries at Tel Kabri and Other Sites in the Levant". Tel Aviv: Journal of the Institute of Archaeology of Tel Aviv University. 29 (2): 328–331. doi:10.1179/033443502788052844.
- Oren, R. (2002a). "Chapter 4: Stratigraphy and Architecture; III: Area D". In A., Kempinski (ed.). Tel Kabri: The 1986–1993 Excavations Seasons. Emery and Claire Yass Publications in Archaeology. pp. 55–72. ISBN 978-965-266-015-2.
- Oren, E. D. (2002b). "Aharon Kempinski". In Ahituv, S.; Oren, E. D. (eds.). Aharon Kempinski Memorial Volume: Studies in Archaeology and Related Disciplines. Beer-Sheva – Studies by the Department of Bible and Ancient Near East. Vol. XV. Beer-Sheva: Ben-Gurion University of the Negev Press. pp. xi–xv. ISSN 0334-2255.
- Prausnitz, M. W. (1959). "Kabri". Israel Exploration Journal. 9: 268–269.
- Prausnitz, M. W. (1970). From Hunters to Farmers and Traders. Jerusalem.
- Prausnitz, M. W.; Kempinski, A. (1977). "Kabri 1976". Israel Exploration Journal. 27: 165–166.
- Samet, Inbal; Bergoffen, Celia J. (2020). "Area D-South 1 : The 2005-2011 Seasons". In Assaf Yasur-Landau; Eric H. Cline (eds.). Excavations at Tel Kabri : the 2005-2011 seasons. Culture and history of the ancient Near East, 1566-2055 ; volume 111. Leiden: Brill. ISBN 9789004425712.
- Science Daily (7 December 2009). "Remains Of Minoan-Style Painting Discovered During Excavations Of Canaanite Palace". Science Daily.
- Shalem, D. (December 2009). "Results of a Salvage Excavation at Tel Kabri". 'Atiqot. 61: 19–39.
- Shalev, G. (2002). "Chapter 8: Metal Artefacts". In A., Kempinski (ed.). Tel Kabri: The 1986–1993 Excavations Seasons. Emery and Claire Yass Publications in Archaeology. pp. 307–318. ISBN 978-965-266-015-2.
- Smithline, H. (2007). "Tel Kabri Final Report". Hadashot Arkheologiyot – Excavations and Surveys in Israel. ISSN 1565-5334.
- Stern, E.; Lewinson-Gilboa, A.; Aviram, J. (1993). The New Encyclopedia of Archaeological Excavations in the Holy Land. Jerusalem: Israel Exploration Society & Carta, Simon and Schuster. ISBN 978-0-13-276312-7.
- Tsuk, T. (2002). "Chapter 3: The Springs of Kabri". In A., Kempinski (ed.). Tel Kabri: The 1986–1993 Excavations Seasons. Emery and Claire Yass Publications in Archaeology. pp. 15–18. ISBN 978-965-266-015-2.
- Wiener, N. (21 June 2013a). "Minoan Frescoes at Tel Kabri". Bible History Daily. Biblical Archaeology Society.
- Wiener, N. (12 September 2013b). "Tel Kabri: The 2013 Excavations". Bible History Daily. Biblical Archaeology Society.
- Wilford, John Noble (22 November 2013). "Wine Cellar, Well Aged, Is Revealed in Israel". The New York Times. p. A6.
- Yasur-Landau, A.; Ebeling, J. R.; Mazow, L. B. (2011). Household Archaeology in Ancient Israel and Beyond. Leiden: Bliss. ISBN 978-900-420-625-0.
- Yasur-Landau, A.; Cline, E. H. (2005). First announcement concerning the results of the 2005 exploratory season at Tel Kabri (PDF) (Report). p. 2.
- Yasur-Landau, A.; Cline, E. H. (2007). "Results of the 2007 Season Kabri Archaeological Project (KAP)" (PDF).
- Yasur-Landau, A.; Cline, E. H. (2008). "Preliminary report on the Results of the 2008 Excavation Season at Tel Kabri" (PDF).
- Yasur-Landau, A.; Cline, E. H. (2009). "Preliminary Report on the Results of the 2009 Excavation Season at Tel Kabri" (PDF).
- Yasur-Landau, A.; Cline, E. H. (2010). "Preliminary Report on the Results of the December 2009/January 2010 Excavation Season at Tel Kabri" (PDF).
- Yasur-Landau, A.; Cline, E. H. (2011). "Preliminary Report on the Results of the 2011 Excavation Season at Tel Kabri" (PDF).
- Yasur-Landau, A.; al. (2013). "Preliminary Report on the Results of the 2013 Excavation Season at Tel Kabri" (PDF).

=== Further reading ===
- Cline, Eric H., Alexandra Ratzlaff, and Assaf Yasur-Landau, eds., "Excavations at Tel Kabri III: The 2013 to 2019 Seasons", Vol. 134. Brill, 2023 ISBN 978-90-04-54832-9
- Negbi, M.; Negbi, O. (2002). "The Painted Plaster Floor of the Tel Kabri Palace: Reflections on Saffron Domestication in the Aegean Bronze Age". In Ahituv, S.; Oren, E. D. (eds.). Aharon Kempinski Memorial Volume: Studies in Archaeology and Related Disciplines. Beer-Sheva – Studies by the Department of Bible and Ancient Near East. Vol. XV. Beer-Sheva: Ben-Gurion University of the Negev Press. pp. 325–340. ISSN 0334-2255.
- Stern, E. (2001). "The Phoenicians". Archaeology of the Land of the Bible Volume II: The Assyrian, Babylonian, and Persian Periods (732-332 B.C.E.). New York: Doubleday. pp. 62–63. ISBN 978-0-385-42450-9.
- Yasur-Landau, A.; Cline, E. H.; Marom, N.; Samet, I. (August 2012). "An MB II Orthostat Building at Tel Kabri, Israel". Bulletin of the American Schools of Oriental Research. 367 (367): 1–29. doi:10.5615/bullamerschoorie.367.0001. S2CID 164124625.
- Yasur-Landau, A.; Cline, E. H.; Samet, I. (2011). "Our Cups Overfloweth: 'Kabri Goblets' and Canaanite Feasts in the Middle Bronze Age Levant" (PDF). In Gauss, W.; Lindbolm, M.; Smith, R.A.K.; et al. (eds.). Our Cups are Full. Pottery and Society in the Aegean Bronze Age: Papers Presented to Jeremy B. Rutter on the Occasion of his 65th Birthday. BAR International Series. Vol. 2227. Oxford: Archaeopress. pp. 382–392. ISBN 978-1-4073-0785-5.
- Yasur-Landau, Assaf, et al. "The wine storage complexes at the Middle Bronze II palace of Tel Kabri: Results of the 2013 and 2015 seasons." American Journal of Archaeology 122.2 (2018): 309-338
- Yasur-Landau, Assaf and Cline, Eric H.Leiden, "Excavations at Tel Kabri: The 2005–2011 Seasons", Brill, 2020 ISBN 978-90-04-42571-2
