= Gilady =

Gilady is a surname. Notable people with the surname include:

- Eival Gilady (born 1957), Israeli businessman and philanthropist
- Nitzan Gilady, Israeli film director
