= Al-Tall, Acre =

al-Tall التلّ al-Tell
- Village
- Etymology: The mound
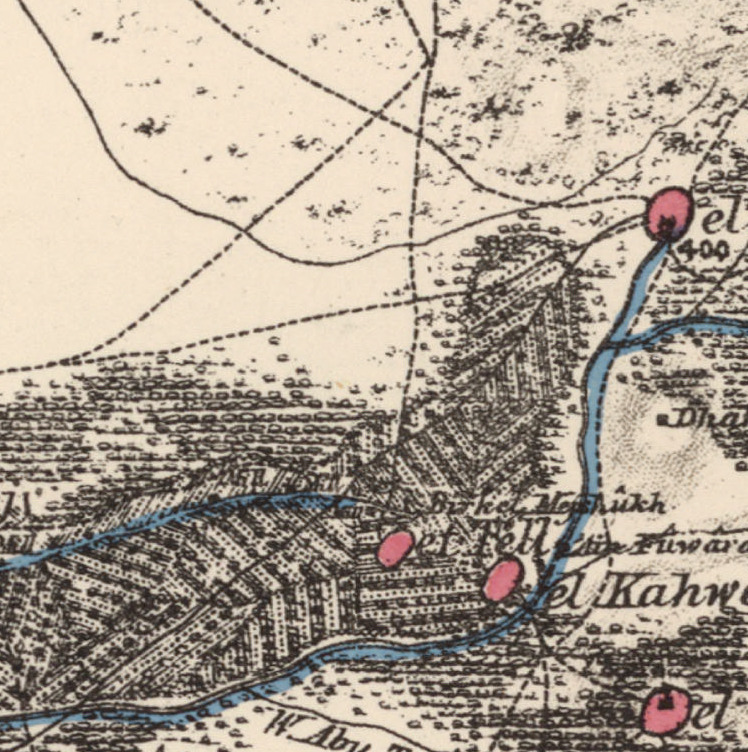
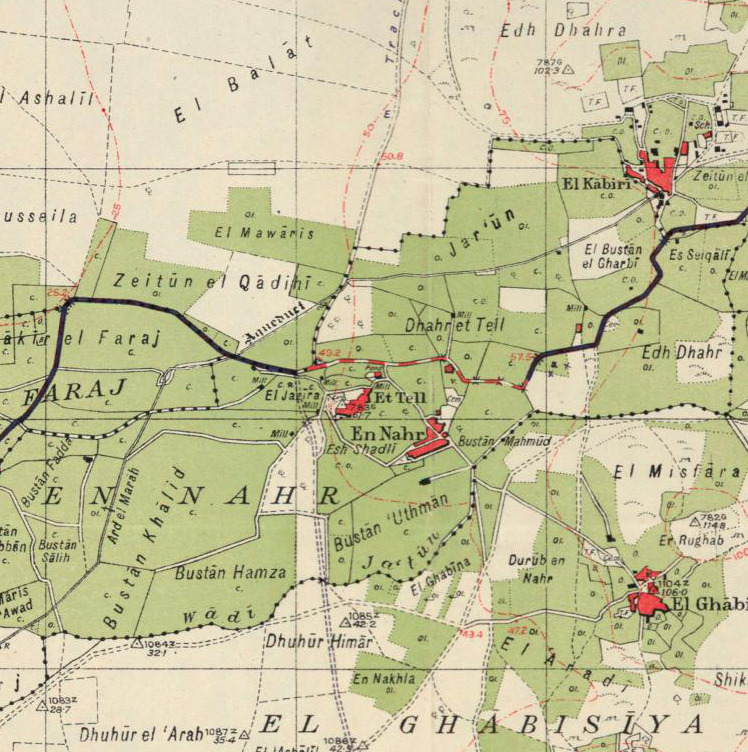
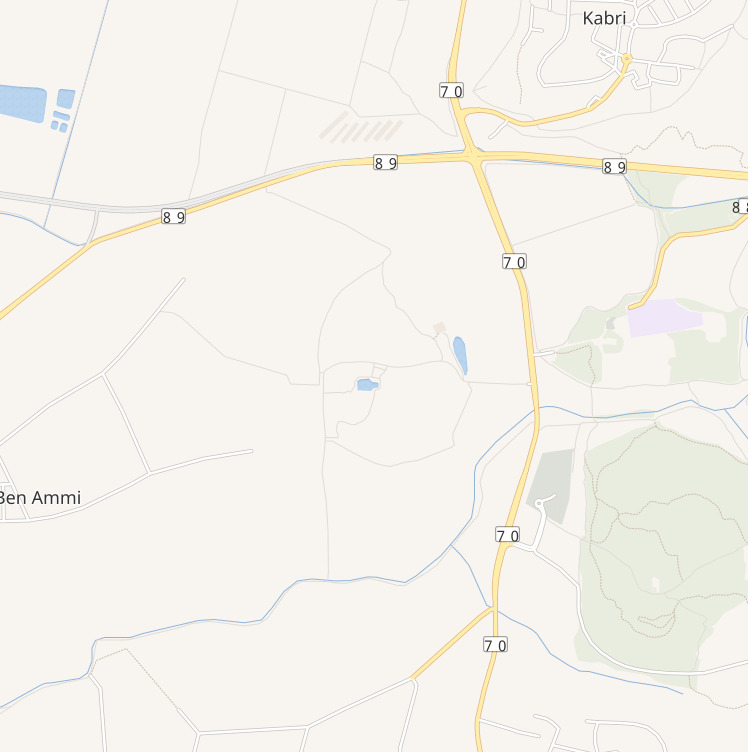
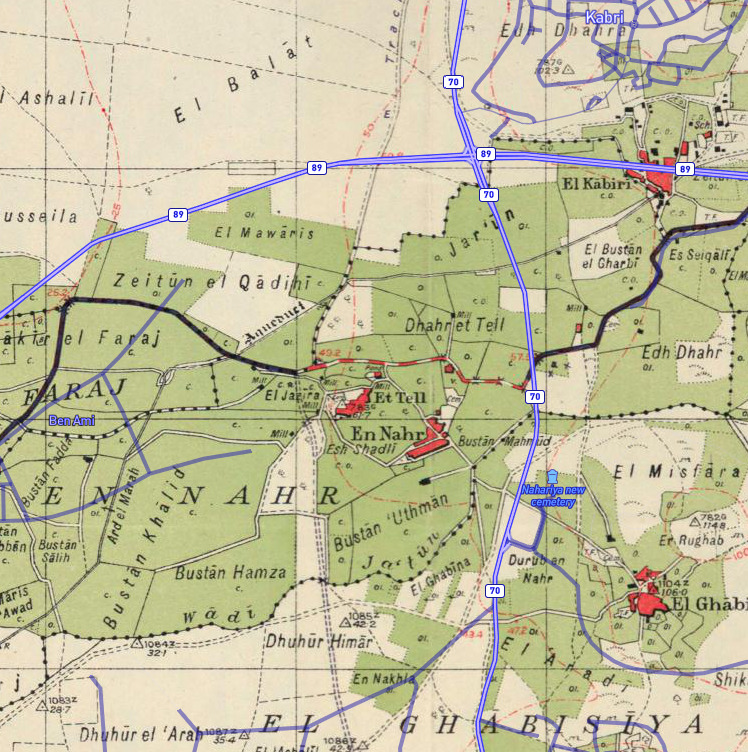
- 1870s map 1940s map modern map 1940s with modern overlay map A series of historical maps of the area around Al-Tall, Acre (click the buttons)

- Location within Mandatory Palestine
- Coordinates: 33°00′31″N 35°08′19″E
- Palestine grid: 163/268
- Geopolitical entity: Mandatory Palestine
- Subdistrict: Acre
- Date of depopulation: 21 May 1948

Area
  - Total: 4,733 dunams (4.733 km^{2}; 1.827 sq mi)

Population (1945)
  - Total: 300
- Cause(s) of depopulation: Military assault by Yishuv forces

Al-Tall (Arabic: التلّ), was a Palestinian village 14 km northeast of Acre in the British Mandate District of Acre. It was forcibly depopulated as a result of military assault and capture during the 1947-1948 Civil War in Mandatory Palestine as part of Operation Operation Ben-Ami by the Carmeli Brigade of the Israel Defense Forces.

== History ==
The twin villages of Al-Tall and nearby Al-Nahr were both sites of ancient settlements atop the tel of Kabri. Recent excavations indicate habitation back to the eighteenth century BC.

=== Ottoman era ===
In the Ottoman period, a mill was shown here on Pierre Jacotin´s map from 1799. In 1875, the French explorer Victor Guérin visited the village, which he called Et-Tell. He described it: "Below the village extend fresh and verdant gardens where the water flows and murmurs incessantly in little canals, and where lofty poplars and great nut-trees, which recall Europe, mingle with the trees of Palestine. Near here is a mill, worked by water falling from a higher basin, which acts as a reservoir for a spring as abundant as that of Ras el 'Ain. After leaving the mill, the water forms a stream which fertilises the adjacent orchards. This raised and broad reservoir, whence the water escapes by an opening made for the purpose in the edge of the reservoir, is of modern construction, as is shown by the stones; but its first building must be ancient, because it is difficult to believe that the ancients should have neglected to get all the advantage possible from so important a spring."

In 1881 the PEF's Survey of Western Palestine described the village as "A stone and adobe village, containing about 200 Moslems, with figs, olive, pomegranate, and mulberry trees and gardens; there are two streams of water at this village." The layout of the village was rectangular. Its houses were built from stone and concrete or from mud.

A population list from about 1887 showed that Nahret Tell had about 275 inhabitants, all Muslim.

=== British era ===
In 1944/1945, the population of Al-Tall was 300.

=== Israeli rule ===
Al-Tall was captured by the Carmeli Brigade during Operation Ben-Ami. Following the war the area was incorporated into the State of Israel, but the village's land has not been incorporated into any municipality or village.

According to the Palestinian historian Walid Khalidi, the remaining structures on the village land were in 1992:

"The site is covered with the rubble of stone houses and is overgrown with wild grass. One stone house still stands but its facade is missing and it is about to crumble. Cactuses and fig trees grow on the southern slopes of the site. There are four identifiable Roman and Byzantine tombs in the cemetery that lies on the northern slopes, a Christ-thorn tree stands in its midst. Recent excavations has uncovered several ancient graves, and the place has been turned into an archaeological site."

In 1993, when A. Petersen visited the place, the only structure he found standing was a cistern, known as Birket al-Mafshukh, located north of the tell. In 1881, it had been described as a "birket of masonry, and a large perennial spring, with a stream flowing from it to the sea; the stream is called the Nahr Mefshukh; gives a very plentiful supply of water." According to Petersen, the birkat was "rectangular with a semi-circular extension at the west end."

== See also ==
- Depopulated Palestinian locations in Israel

== Bibliography ==
- Conder, C.R.; Kitchener, H.H. (1881). The Survey of Western Palestine: Memoirs of the Topography, Orography, Hydrography, and Archaeology. Vol. 1. London: Committee of the Palestine Exploration Fund.
- Guérin, V. (1880). Description Géographique Historique et Archéologique de la Palestine (in French). Vol. 3: Galilee, pt. 2. Paris: L'Imprimerie Nationale.
- Karmon, Y. (1960). "An Analysis of Jacotin's Map of Palestine" (PDF). Israel Exploration Journal. 10 (3, 4): 155–173, 244–253. Archived from the original (PDF) on 2017-12-01.
- Khalidi, W. (1992). All That Remains: The Palestinian Villages Occupied and Depopulated by Israel in 1948. Washington D.C.: Institute for Palestine Studies. ISBN 0-88728-224-5.
- Morris, B. (2004). The Birth of the Palestinian Refugee Problem Revisited. Cambridge University Press. ISBN 978-0-521-00967-6.
- Palmer, E.H. (1881). The Survey of Western Palestine: Arabic and English Name Lists Collected During the Survey by Lieutenants Conder and Kitchener, R. E. Transliterated and Explained by E.H. Palmer. Committee of the Palestine Exploration Fund.
- Petersen, Andrew (2001). A Gazetteer of Buildings in Muslim Palestine (British Academy Monographs in Archaeology). Vol. 1. Oxford University Press. ISBN 978-0-19-727011-0.
- Schumacher, G. (1888). "Population list of the Liwa of Akka". Quarterly Statement - Palestine Exploration Fund. 20: 169–191.
- Stern, E.; Lewinson-Gilboa, A.; Avriam, J. (1993). The New Encyclopedia of Archaeological Excavations in the Holy Land. Vol. 3. Jerusalem: Israel Exploration Society & Carta, Simon and Schuster. pp. 839–841. ISBN 0-13-276312-5.
