= Al-Kabri massacre =

1948 Israeli military operation

Coordinates: 33°0′55.72″N 35°9′3.17″E

The Al-Kabri massacre occurred when the Israeli army attacked the Palestinian village of Al-Kabri on the night of May 20-21, 1948, during the 1948 Palestine war. The attack was part of Operation Ben-Ami, itself a part of Plan Dalet. Orders were given to "attack with the aim of capturing, the villages of Kabri, Umm al Faraj and Al-Nahr, to kill the men [and] to destroy and set fire to the villages", orders which Meron Benvenisti states were "carried out to the letter". At least seven people were killed. The attack was committed partially as revenge for the March 27 Yehiam convoy ambush.

== Attack ==
On the night of May 20-21, 1948, the Israeli Carmeli Brigade captured al-Kabri (Arabic: الكابري), a Palestinian Arab village in the northwest corner of the region of the British Mandate of Palestine that was later incorporated into the State of Israel. Historian Saleh Abdel Jawad writes that Moshe Carmeli gave orders "to attack with the aim of conquest, the killing of adult males, destruction and torching." Al-Kabri was captured without any resistance and it was almost immediately depopulated. It was treated particularly harshly due to the villagers involvement with the destruction of the Jewish convoy. According to Walid Khalidi, an 'undisclosed number of villagers were taken prisoner and some were killed' and others were killed during their dispersal in Galilee when it was discovered that they had come from al-Kabri. Jawad writes "seven young men murdered."

== Historiography ==
Historian Benny Morris wrote that "a number of villagers" were "apparently executed."

== Firsthand accounts ==
Dov Yirmiya of the IDF took part in the attack on al-Kabri. He reported:

Kabri was conquered without a fight. Almost all inhabitants fled. One of the soldiers, Yehuda Reshef, who was together with his brother among the few escapees from the Yehi’am convoy, got hold of a few youngsters who did not escape, probably seven, ordered them to fill up some ditches dug as an obstacle and then lined them up and fired at them with a machine gun. A few died but some of the wounded succeeded to escape.

Aminah Muhammad Musa, a Palestinian refugee from al-Kabri testified:

My husband and I left Kabri the day before it fell... At dawn [the next day], while my husband was preparing for his morning prayer, our friend Raja passed us and urged us to proceed, saying that we should run... It was not too long before we were met by the Jews... They took us and a few other villagers... in an armoured car back to the village. There a Jewish officer interrogated us and, putting a gun to my husband's neck, he said "You are from Kabri?"... The Jews took away my husband, Ibrahim Dabajah, Hussain Hassan al-Khubaizah, Khalil al-Tamlawi, Uthman Iban As'ad Mahmud, and Raja. They left the rest of us... An officer came to me and asked me not to cry. We slept in the village orchards that night. The next morning, Umm Hussain and I went to the village... I saw Umm Taha on the way to the village courtyard. She cried and said "You had better go see your dead husband." I found him. He was shot in the back of the head.

== Bibliography ==
- Benveniśtî, M. (2000). Sacred landscape: the buried history of the Holy Land since 1948 (Illustrated ed.). University of California Press. ISBN 0-520-92882-2.
- Khalidi, W. (1992). All That Remains: The Palestinian Villages Occupied and Depopulated by Israel in 1948. Washington D.C.: Institute for Palestine Studies. ISBN 0-88728-224-5.
- Morris, B. (2004). The Birth of the Palestinian Refugee Problem Revisited. Cambridge University Press. ISBN 0-521-00967-7.
- Nazzal, Nafez (1978). The Palestinian Exodus from Galilee 1948. Beirut: The Institute for Palestine Studies. ISBN 9780887281280.
