= Ben Ami =

Ben Ami: בֶּן עַמִּי (Hebrew)
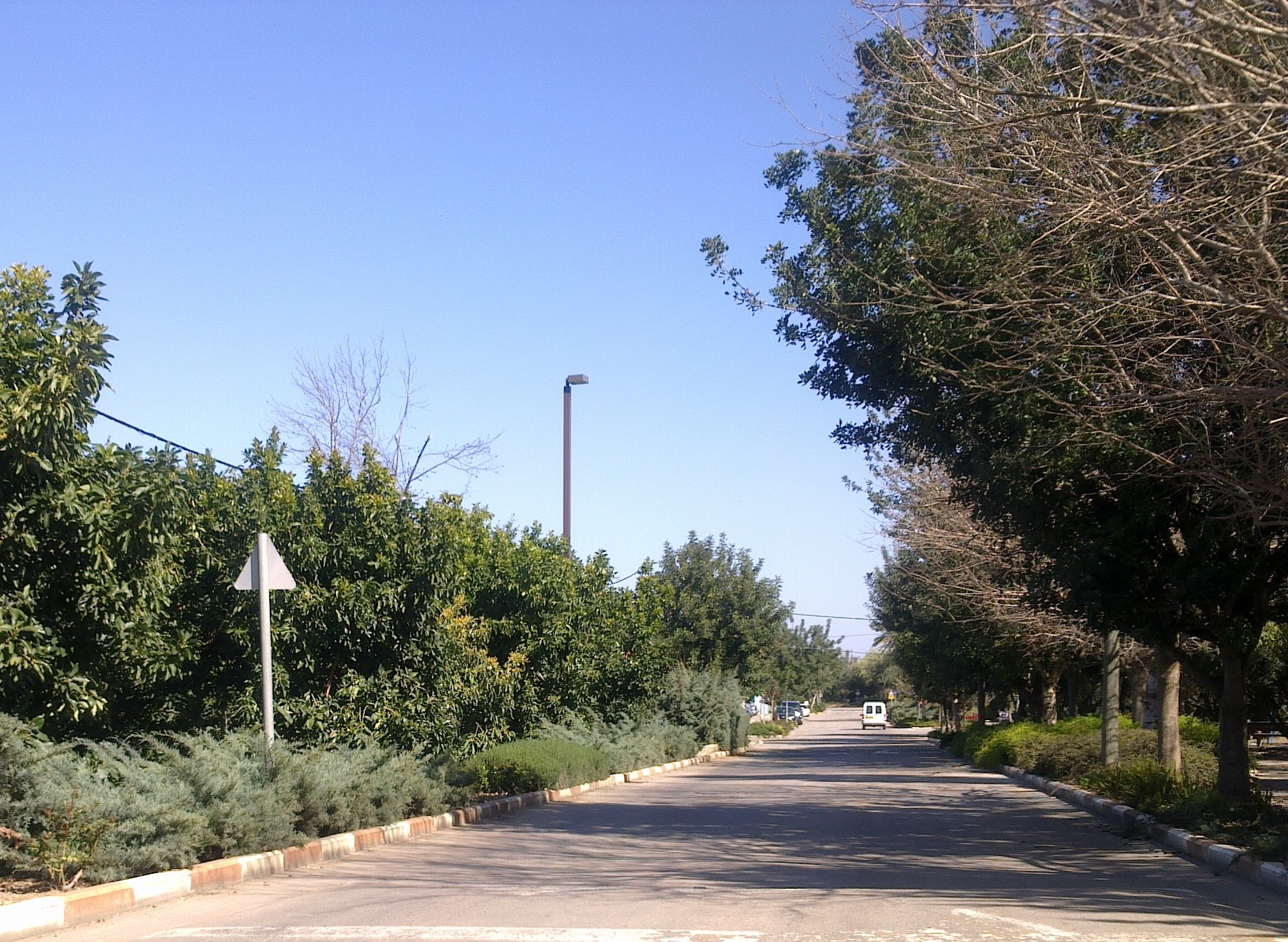

- Location within Northwest Israel Location within Israel
- Coordinates: 33°0′23″N 35°7′29″E
- Country: Israel
- District: Northern
- Subdistrict: Acre
- Council: Matte Asher
- Affiliation: Moshavim movement
- Founded: 1949
- Founder: Demobilized IDF Soldiers
- Population (2024): 776

Ben Ami (Hebrew: בֶּן עַמִּי) is an agricultural settlement in the Northern District of Israel. Located next to Nahariya, it falls under the jurisdiction of Mateh Asher Regional Council. As of 2024 its population was 776.

== History ==
The moshav was founded in 1949 by demobilized soldiers on lands which were located near the depopulated former Palestinian villages of al-Nahr and Umm al-Faraj.

The moshav is named after Ben Ami Pechter, the commander of a battalion in the Carmeli Brigade during the War of Independence, who fell in the Yehiam convoy attack.

Ben Ami was one of settlements hit by Katyusha rockets sent by Hezbollah on 14 July 2006 during the 2006 Lebanon War.
