= Eival Gilady =

Israeli businessman

- עיבל גלעדי
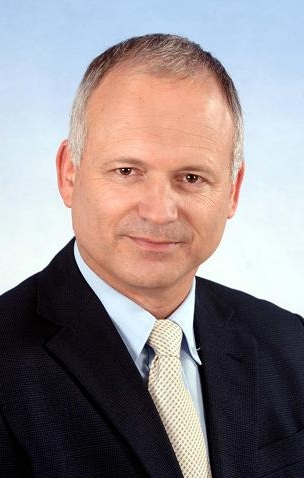
- Eival Gilady
- Born: 1957 (age 68–69); Israel
- Other name: עיבל גלעדי
- Occupations: businessman, philanthropist
- Children: 4

Eival Gilady (Hebrew: עיבל גלעדי; born 1957 in Israel) is an Israeli businessman.

== Biography ==
Eival Gilady earned his Bachelor’s and three master's degrees from the University of Haifa, National Defense University and George Washington University, in Resource Management, Policy Analysis, National Security Strategy, and Public Finance. He was a research fellow at Stanford University's Hoover Institution and Center for International Security and Cooperation (1999–2001).

Gilady lives on Kibbutz Kabri in the Western Galilee and is married with four children.

== Military career ==
A Brigadier General in the Israel Defense Forces (IDF), Gilady commanded field units for twenty years, and served an additional ten years on the General Staff.

Gilady enlisted in the IDF in 1975. He served as a field artillery officer in the Golan Heights in command and fire support positions, and participated in operations beyond lines with special forces and other units. In 1982–1984, he was the Commander of Battalion 334 deployed in Lebanon (First Lebanon War). Following his promotion to Colonel in 1988, he commanded the Field Artillery School (Shivta) and special forces. In 1996, Gilady was promoted to Brigadier General and was appointed Assistant Chief Officer of the IDF General Staff’s Planning Division of the Planning Directorate, where he was responsible for managing the IDF’s long-term planning, force build-up, and multibillion-dollar budgeting. Gilady was appointed Head of the Strategic Planning Division in 2001, where he led strategic planning, national security policy formulation, international diplomacy and regional negotiations. Working closely with Prime Minister Sharon in 2001–2004 (Second Intifada), he developed the Gaza Disengagement Plan as part of a long-term process between Israel and the Palestinian Authority. In 2005, Prime Minister Sharon appointed Gilady Head of Coordination and Strategy within the Prime Minister’s Office, to implement the Gaza Disengagement Plan.

== Civil service and business career ==
Gilady was founder and CEO of the Portland Trust in Israel (2005–2011), a British foundation established to foster peace and stability in the Middle East through economic development. Projects initiated under his leadership focused on developing the Palestinian economy through entrepreneurship and social investment, and reducing poverty in Israel’s periphery through financial tools and investment.

He was the Chairman of KIEDF - Koret Israel Economic Development Funds (2007–2013), which stimulates economic development and employment opportunity in Israel through financing of small businesses and microenterprises. During his tenure, approximately 9,000 businesses were supported with over $200 million in financing, and more than 30,000 jobs were created. Eival Gilady is the Chairman of Western Galilee College, an institution for higher education with an enrollment of 5,000. He is also the Chairman of the Northern Goals Association, promoting social services for underprivileged children and families in northern Israel.

Gilady is Honorary President of the Israeli-Palestinian Chamber of Commerce, of which he was co-founder and first Chairman (2008–2011). In addition, Gilady is the President of Vanadis Ltd., providing "Strategy beyond Borders," and is the founder and Chairman of M-Power Israel, a social innovation lab dedicated to empowering disadvantaged populations. Gilady is the Honorary Consul of the Republic of Slovenia in Tel Aviv.

Gilady was appointed Head of Coordination and Strategy by Prime Minister Ariel Sharon in 2005, and previously served as Head of the Israel Defense Forces’ Strategic Planning Division (2001–2004). His responsibility in this position encompassed strategic net assessment and all areas of politico-military policy recommendations, including the security aspects of the peace process and peace talks. Within the context of this role, he was responsible for developing the Gaza Disengagement Plan.
