= Daniel Rosolio =

Israeli politician (1927–2005)

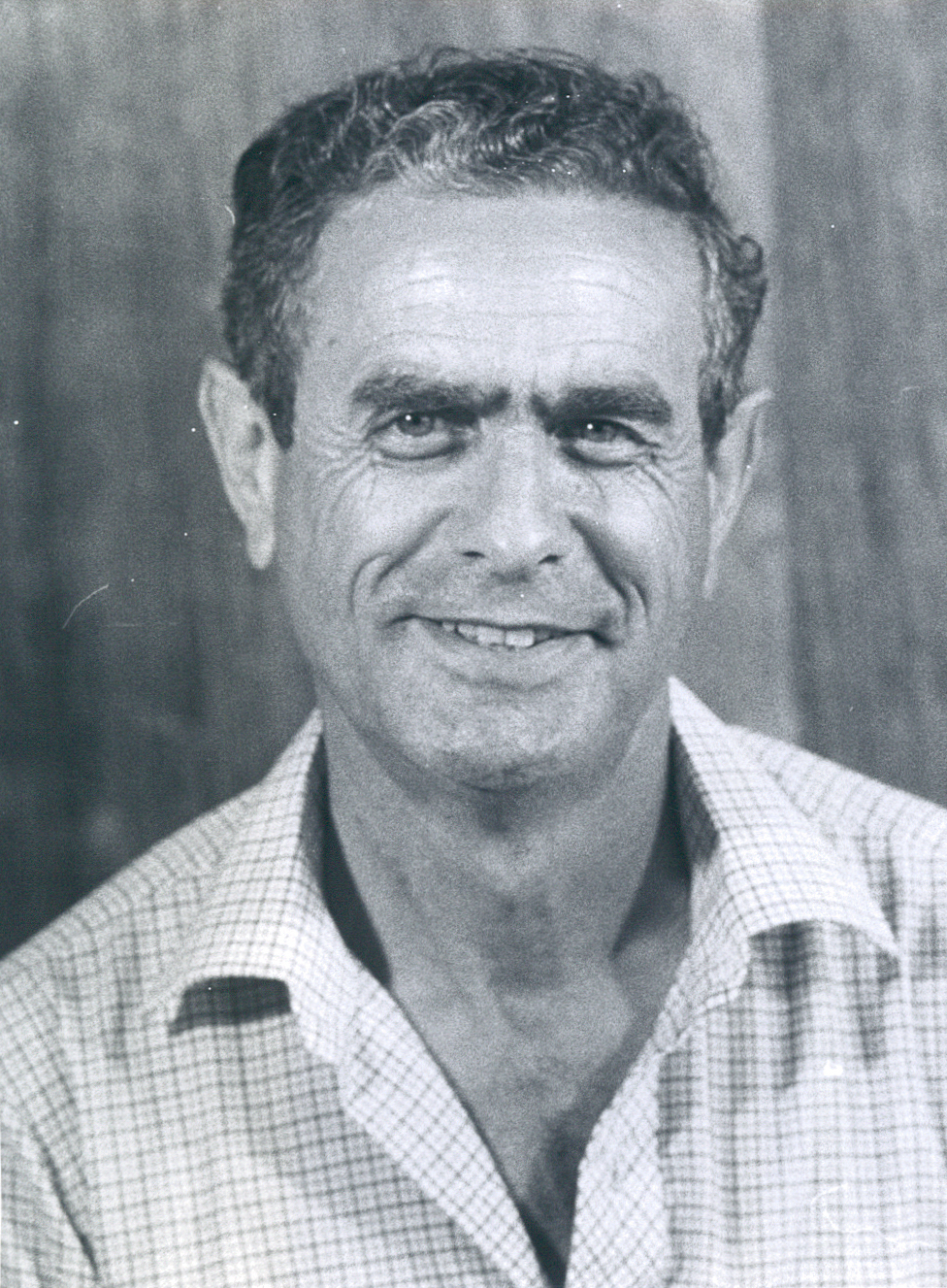

Faction represented in the Knesset
- 1977–1983: Alignment

Personal details
- Born: 6 May 1927 Tel Aviv, Mandatory Palestine
- Died: 14 October 2005 (aged 78) Kabri, Israel

Daniel Rosolio (Hebrew: דניאל רוזוליו; 6 May 1927 – 14 October 2005) was an Israeli politician who served as a member of the Knesset for the Alignment between 1977 and 1983.

== Biography ==
Born in Tel Aviv during the Mandate era, Rosolio attended the Shalva high school. He was certified as a teacher at the Kibbutzim Seminary, and was later awarded an MA and PhD in political science from Tel Aviv University.

He was a member of the HaMahanot HaOlim movement, and served as its secretary between 1946 and 1947. In 1947 he joined Kibbutz Beit HaArava, and served in the Israel Defense Forces as part of the Beit HaArava group in Sedom. When the kibbutz was evacuated during the 1948 Arab-Israeli War, he moved to the north of Israel and was amongst the founders of Kibbutz Kabri in the Western Galilee and lived there until his death. From 1952 until 1957 he worked as a teacher in the kibbutz's school. In 1958 he became co-ordinator of the Hashomer Hatzair section of the Kibbutz HaMeuhad movement, a post he held until 1961. From 1962 until 1965 he taught in Kabri's high school, before serving as the kibbutz's secretary from 1965 until 1966. Between 1967 and 1969 he worked as an assistant to Yisrael Galili, a government minister.

In 1969 he began working in the Prime Minister's office and was responsible for Information Services. From 1972 until 1976 he was secretary of Kibbutz HaMeuhad. In 1977 he was elected to the Knesset on the Alignment list. He was re-elected in 1981, but resigned from the Knesset on 16 May 1983, and was replaced by Haim Ramon. In the same year he became chairman of the board of directors at Solel Boneh construction company, a role he held until 1986, and secretary of Hevrat HaOvdim.

He died at his home in 2005 at the age of 78.
