= Al-Nahr =

al-Nahr النهر an-Nahr
- Etymology: In 1881, the place was named Kahweh, meaning "the coffee shop"
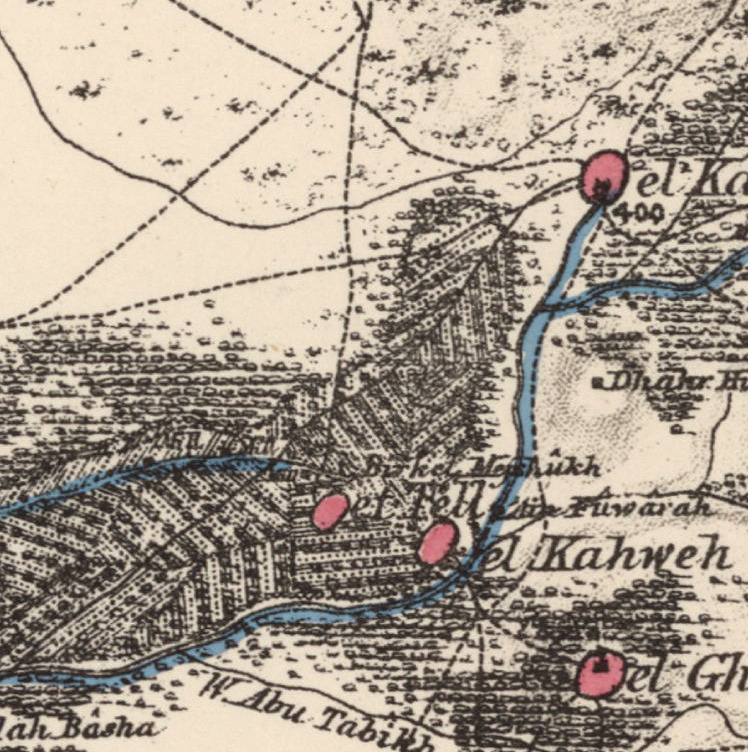
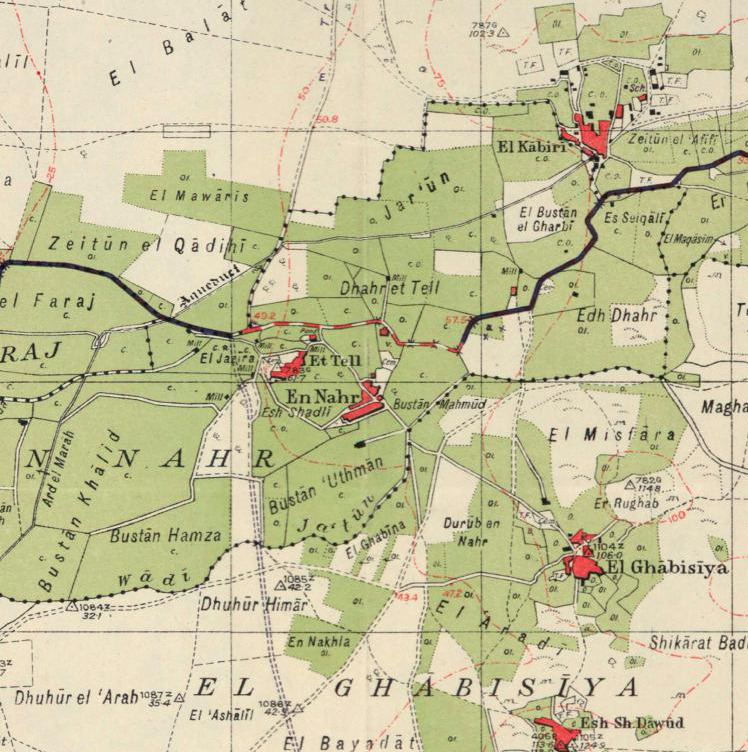
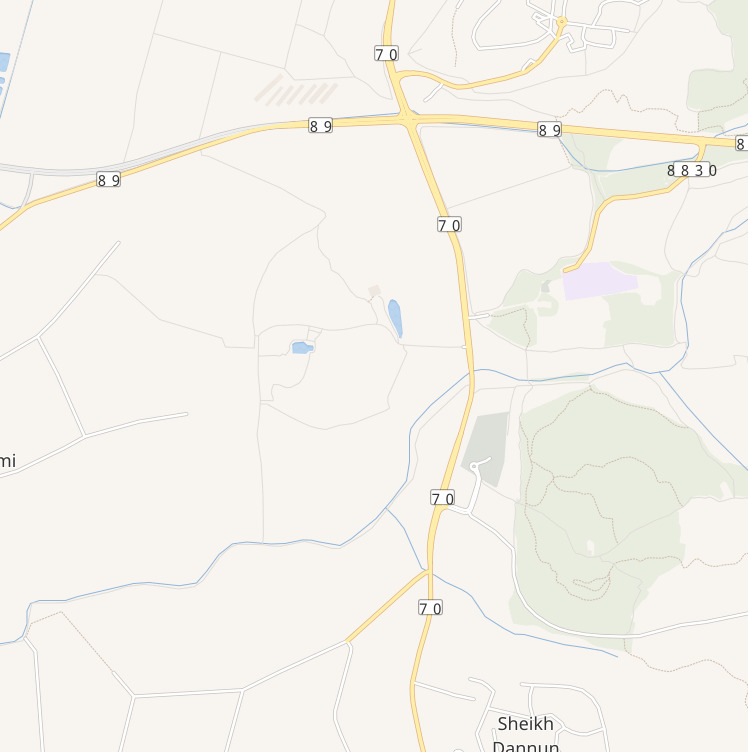
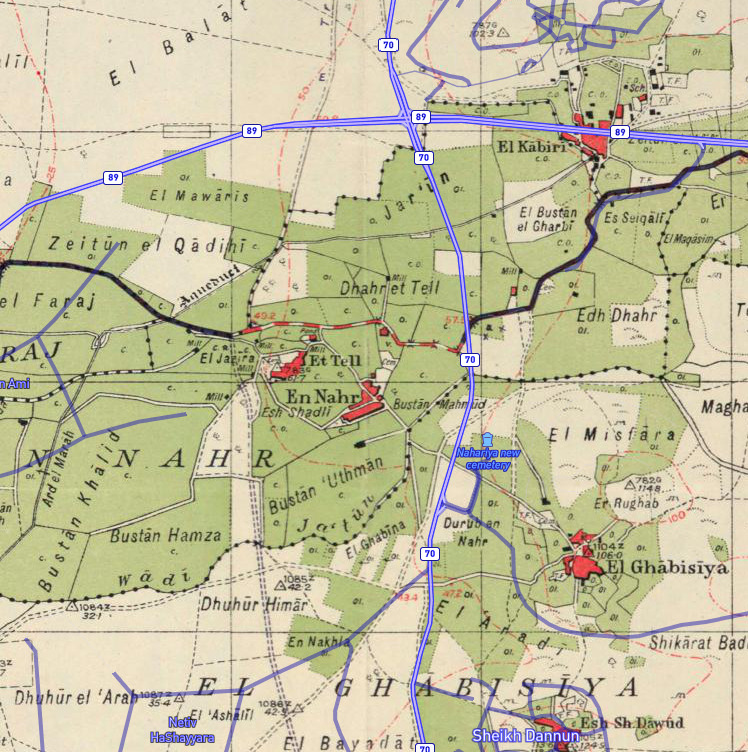
- 1870s map 1940s map modern map 1940s with modern overlay map A series of historical maps of the area around Al-Nahr (click the buttons)

- Location within Mandatory Palestine
- Coordinates: 33°00′26″N 35°08′29″E
- Palestine grid: 163/268
- Geopolitical entity: Mandatory Palestine
- Subdistrict: Acre
- Date of depopulation: 21 May 1948

Area
  - Total: 5,261 dunams (5.261 km^{2}; 2.031 sq mi)

Population (1945)
  - Total: 610
- Cause(s) of depopulation: Military assault by Yishuv forces
- Current Localities: Ben Ami, Kabri

al-Nahr (Arabic: النهر), was a Palestinian village 14 km (8.7 mi) northeast of Acre. It was depopulated in May 1948 after a military assault carried out by the Carmeli Brigade as part of the Israel Defense Forces's Operation Ben-Ami. Immediately after the assault, the village of al-Nahr was razed.

== History ==
The twin villages of al-Nahr and nearby al-Tall were both sites of ancient settlements atop the tel of Kabri. Recent excavations indicate habitation back to the sixth millennium BC.

=== Ottoman era ===
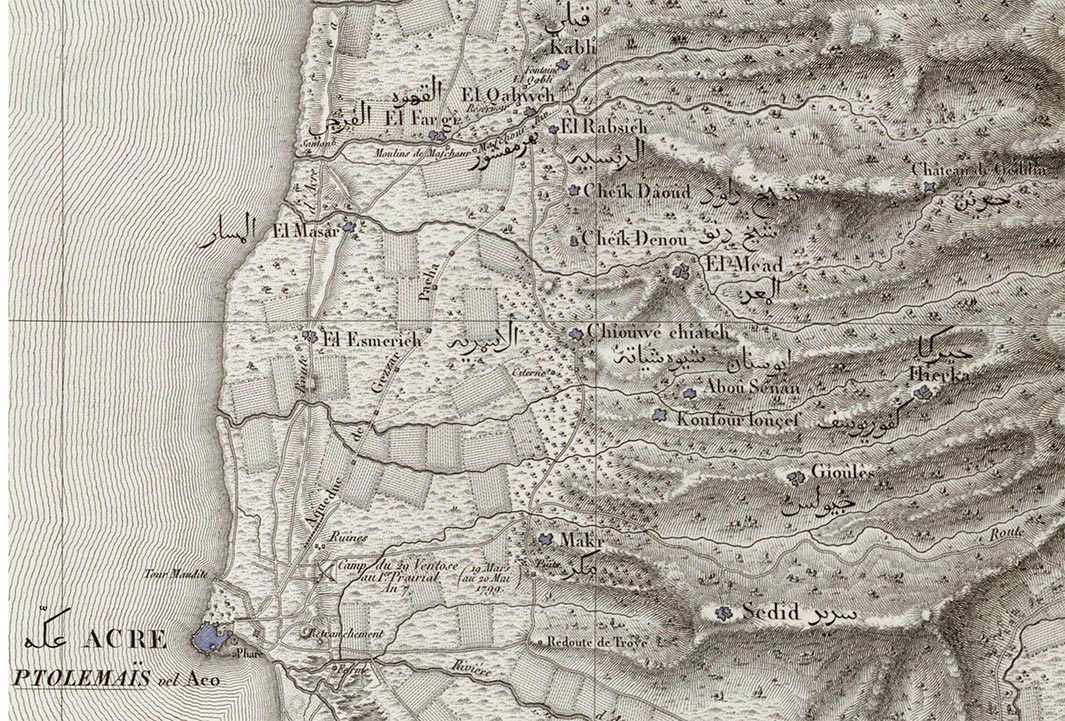
Named El Qahweh in Pierre Jacotin's map from 1799

In the Ottoman period, the village appeared under the name of El Qahweh in Pierre Jacotin´s map from 1799. In 1875, the French explorer Victor Guérin visited the village, which he called El Kahoueh. He found it to have 120 inhabitants, all Muslims.

In 1881 the PEF's Survey of Western Palestine described the village, then named El Kahweh, as a "stone village, containing about 250 Moslems, [] situated on the plain, surrounded by figs, olives, mulberries, and pomegranates; there is a spring and flowing stream at this village."

A population list from about 1887 showed that el Kahweh had 370 inhabitant; all Muslims.

=== British Mandate era ===
In the 1922 census of Palestine conducted by the British Mandate authorities, Al Nahr wa Tal had a population of 422; 3 Bahai, the rest Muslim. In the 1931 census, Al-Nahr had 522 Muslim inhabitants, in a total of 120 houses.

In villagers of Al-Nahr lived principally of agriculture and animal husbandry. In the 1945 statistics it had a population of 610 Muslims, with 5,261 dunams of land. A total of 2,066 dunums was used for citrus and bananas, 1,094 dunums were allotted to cereals, 1,937 dunums were irrigated or used for orchards, of which 30 dunums were planted in olive trees, while 28 dunams were built-up land.

==== 1948 war ====
On March 27, 1948, hundreds of armed villagers and units of the Arab Liberation Army attacked a Jewish convoy near Kabri, killing forty-nine Jews. Six Arabs were also killed in the battle. Two months later the commander of Operation Ben-Ami gave operational orders given that day were to "attack with the aim of capturing, the villages of Kabri, Umm al Faraj and Al-Nahr, to kill the men [and] to destroy and set fire to the villages." Benvenisti states that "the orders were carried out to the letter", while Morris writes that a number of villagers were apparently executed.

=== Israeli period ===
Following the war the area was incorporated into the State of Israel. The kibbutz of Kabri was founded the following year and uses land that had belonged to al-Nahr. The moshav Ben Ami, named after the fallen commander of an attack on nearby Nahariyya, was also established on the village's land. In 1992, the village site was described as "Only two houses remain, and one of them is partially destroyed. A tall date-palm tree grows on the village site, which is overgrown by wild grasses, a few cactuses, and fig trees. The cemetery, on the western side of the village contains one identifiable grave. The nearby Fawwara spring has been fenced in and declared private property."

== See also ==
- Depopulated Palestinian locations in Israel

== Bibliography ==
- Barron, J.B., ed. (1923). Palestine: Report and General Abstracts of the Census of 1922. Government of Palestine.
- Benveniśtî, M. (2000). Sacred landscape: the buried history of the Holy Land since 1948. University of California Press. ISBN 978-0-520-23422-2.
- Conder, C.R.; Kitchener, H.H. (1881). The Survey of Western Palestine: Memoirs of the Topography, Orography, Hydrography, and Archaeology. Vol. 1. London: Committee of the Palestine Exploration Fund.
- Department of Statistics (1945). Village Statistics, April, 1945. Government of Palestine.
- Guérin, V. (1880). Description Géographique Historique et Archéologique de la Palestine (in French). Vol. 3: Galilee, pt. 2. Paris: L'Imprimerie Nationale.
- Hadawi, S. (1970). Village Statistics of 1945: A Classification of Land and Area ownership in Palestine. Palestine Liberation Organization Research Center. Archived from the original on 2018-12-08.
- Karmon, Y. (1960). "An Analysis of Jacotin's Map of Palestine" (PDF). Israel Exploration Journal. 10 (3, 4): 155–173, 244–253. Archived from the original (PDF) on 2017-12-01.
- Khalidi, W. (1992). All That Remains: The Palestinian Villages Occupied and Depopulated by Israel in 1948. Washington D.C.: Institute for Palestine Studies. ISBN 0-88728-224-5.
- Mills, E., ed. (1932). Census of Palestine 1931. Population of Villages, Towns and Administrative Areas. Jerusalem: Government of Palestine.
- Morris, B. (2004). The Birth of the Palestinian Refugee Problem Revisited. Cambridge University Press. ISBN 978-0-521-00967-6.
- Morris, B., (second edition 2004 third printing 2006) The Birth Of The Palestinian Refugee Problem Revisited, Cambridge University Press, ISBN 0-521-00967-7
- Palmer, E.H. (1881). The Survey of Western Palestine: Arabic and English Name Lists Collected During the Survey by Lieutenants Conder and Kitchener, R. E. Transliterated and Explained by E.H. Palmer. Committee of the Palestine Exploration Fund.
- Schumacher, G. (1888). "Population list of the Liwa of Akka". Quarterly Statement - Palestine Exploration Fund. 20: 169–191.
- Stern, E.; Lewinson-Gilboa, A.; Avriam, J. (1993). The New Encyclopedia of Archaeological Excavations in the Holy Land. Vol. 3. Jerusalem: Israel Exploration Society & Carta, Simon and Schuster. pp. 839–841. ISBN 0-13-276312-5.
